= If You See Her, Say Hello =

1975 song by Bob Dylan

Single by Bob Dylan

from the album Blood on the Tracks
- A-side: "Tangled Up in Blue"
- Released: January 20, 1975
- Recorded: December 30, 1974
- Studio: Sound 80, Minneapolis, Minnesota
- Length: 4:49
- Label: Columbia
- Songwriter: Bob Dylan
- Producer: David Zimmerman (uncredited)

Blood on the Tracks track listing
- 10 tracks Side one: 1. "Tangled Up in Blue"; 2. "Simple Twist of Fate"; 3. "You're a Big Girl Now"; 4. "Idiot Wind"; 5. "You're Gonna Make Me Lonesome When You Go"; Side two: 6. "Meet Me in the Morning"; 7. "Lily, Rosemary and the Jack of Hearts"; 8. "If You See Her, Say Hello"; 9. "Shelter from the Storm"; 10. "Buckets of Rain"

"If You See Her, Say Hello" is a song by American singer-songwriter Bob Dylan from his 15th studio album, Blood on the Tracks (1975). The song is one of five on the album that Dylan initially recorded in New York City in September 1974 and then re-recorded in Minneapolis. The later recording, made on December 30, 1974, was produced by Dylan's brother David Zimmerman, who was not credited. The recording later became the album track and the B-side of the "Tangled Up in Blue" single, released in February 1975.

The complete New York recording sessions of "If You See Her, Say Hello" were released on the deluxe edition of The Bootleg Series Vol. 14: More Blood, More Tracks in 2018, with the first take of the song, recorded on September 16, 1974, also included on the single-CD and 2-LP versions of the compilation. The second take of the song, from the same September 16 session, had been released in 1991 on The Bootleg Series Volumes 1–3 (Rare & Unreleased) 1961–1991. The deluxe version of The Bootleg Series Vol. 14 also included a remix of the December 1974 master issued on Blood on the Tracks. The song received generally positive reviews from music critics, being named by some as an album highlight, and it has been included on several lists of Dylan's best songs. Dylan's first live performance of the song was on April 18, 1976, at Civic Centre, Lakeland, Florida, and featured new lyrics. An Italian version of the song was recorded by Francesco De Gregori, titled "Non Dirle Che Non È Così".

== Recording and composition ==
Dylan first recorded "If You See Her, Say Hello" in New York City on September 16, 1974, during the initial Blood on the Tracks sessions at A&R Studios, with two solo takes on that day. These were followed by a third on September 19, where he was accompanied by Tony Brown on bass. That December, working from a suggestion made by his brother David Zimmerman that the album should have a more commercial sound, Dylan re-recorded five of the ten songs on Blood on the Tracks, including "If You See Her, Say Hello" on December 30, 1974, at Sound 80 in Minneapolis, Minnesota. Dylan played mandolin that was overdubbed on the track.

Zimmerman was the producer for the Minneapolis recordings, but was not credited on the album. The re-recorded versions were radical departures from the original recordings, and each new recording included changes to the lyrics from the earlier versions. The session featured a full band: Kevin Odegard (guitar), Chris Weber (guitar) Gregg Inhofer (keyboards), Billy Peterson (bass), and Bill Berg (drums), with Dylan singing, and on guitar and harmonica. These musicians were based locally and had arrived after Zimmerman's contact, and Dylan had not met them before they started working together on December 27, 1974.

The Minneapolis version was included as the eighth track on Blood on the Tracks, released on January 20, 1975. (Note: Some sources state the release date as January 17, 1975) The album reached number one on the US Billboard 200. The song was also issued as the B-side of the single "Tangled up in Blue" in February 1975. The single reached number 31 on the US Billboard Hot 100. The second take from September 16, 1974, was released in 1991 on The Bootleg Series Volumes 1–3 (Rare & Unreleased) 1961–1991, and the version from September 19 was included on the November 1974 Blood on the Tracks test pressing. All of the recorded versions, including a remix of the December 1974 master issued on Blood on the Tracks were included on the deluxe edition of The Bootleg Series Vol. 14: More Blood, More Tracks (2018). The first take of the song, recorded on September 16, 1974, was also included on the single-CD and 2-LP versions of the compilation.

== Personnel ==
- Bob Dylan – lead vocals, acoustic guitar, mandolin
- Chris Weber – acoustic twelve-string guitar
- Peter Ostroushko – mandolin
- Gregg Inhofer – Hammond organ
- Bill Berg – drums

== Interpretation and critical reception ==
Aware that many people thought Blood on the Tracks was autobiographical, Dylan told Bill Flanagan in a 1985 interview "It didn't pertain to me. It was just a concept of putting in images that defy time – yesterday, today and tomorrow. I wanted to make them all connect in some kind of a strange way." In his 2004 memoir Chronicles: Volume One, Dylan says that Blood on the Tracks was "an entire album based on Chekhov short stories. Critics thought it was autobiographical – that was fine". The opening lines of the album version of the song are:

"If you see her, say hello, she might be in Tangier
She left here last early Spring, is livin' there, I hear
Say for me that I'm all right, though things get kind of slow
She might think that I've forgotten her, don't tell her it isn't so"

Phillipe Margotin and Jean-Michel Guesdon describe the song succinctly as a "sad love story", commenting that it is reminiscent of Dylan's earlier "Girl from the North Country" (1963). Similarities with the earlier track were also commented on at the time of the album's release by multiple writers, although it was noted by Lyn Van Matre of the Chicago Tribune that unlike in "Girl from the North Country", "this time the woman rather than Dylan himself, leaves to ramble". Robin Deneslow, in The Guardian, praised the song as "as immediately attractive as 'Girl from the North Country' but infinitely more mature and emotionally complex". Timothy Hampton, in Critical Inquiry, noted that "each verse ends with the singer mouthing a statement of consolation that undermines the account of the events of the affair he has just offered. This ironic display of self-delusion is unprecedented in Dylan's work."

Some reviewers identified "If You See Her, Say Hello" as a standout on Blood on the Tracks. John Edmiston, in The Paris News, and Mike Kalina, in the Pittsburgh Post-Gazette, both named the track as their favourite on the album; Kalina felt that the song covers the same topic as Dylan's "I Threw It All Away" (1969), and Edmiston praised Dylan's lyrics as "magnetic, icy". The track's similarity to earlier work by Dylan was seen as a negative by March French, who, in a generally positive review, opined that "If You See Her, Say Hello" and "You're a Big Girl Now" are the weakest two tracks on the album due to being "retreads". Praise from other reviewers included the comments "exquisite … an old love remembered with dignity"; "stunningly beautiful"; "Dylan's sadness bring out the beauty of this song"; and that the song was "unsentimental but strongly felt".

Jon Landau of Rolling Stone criticized the "awkwardness" of the music, while Jonathan Cott, in the same issue of the magazine, gave a more positive review and stated that "You're a Big Girl Now" and "If You See Her, Say Hello" are "the two most direct and poignant songs about rejection and the two least mediated by a narrative foil" on the album. Oliver Trager wrote that the song "may be the most painful" on Blood on the Tracks, with the narrator haunted by memories of a woman that he loved; a 2016 Rolling Stone article also stated that it "might be the most painful moment on" the album. Andrew Ford commented in The Sydney Morning Herald that "the vicious irony of Dylan's exaggerated pronunciation of 'separation' … can't be represented on the printed page", and Dylan's delivery was also covered by Robert Shelton, who singled out the delivery of the couplet "Either I'm too sensitive/Or else I'm gettin' soft" as showing that the song's narrator "cannot keep his feelings from bursting out". Shelton says that the vocal delivery has similarities to performances by Dylan during his 1974 tour, giving the examples "he turns 'chill' into 'chi-i-u-ill,' 'stay' into 'stay-hay-ay' and 'town' into 'town-ow-ow-un-un".

Bootleg recordings from the September 1974 sessions were circulated before the official releases of those sessions on albums in The Bootleg Series, including the ones of "If You See Her, Say Hello". In 1989, Ford wrote that "the original version was faster, harder and tinged with off-hand bitterness", and bemoaned the failure of commentators to consider the original in their coverage. Later commentators did compare the September and December versions. Nigel Williamson felt that the album's version "toned down the hurt and anger" from the September session.

Margotin and Guesdon rate the song as one of Dylan's best. Jim Beviglia ranks it 56th in his 2013 assessment of the 100 best Dylan songs, and Rolling Stone placed the track 63rd in their 2016 ranking of the 100 greatest Dylan songs. A 2021 article in The Guardian included it on a list of "80 Bob Dylan songs everyone should know".

== Live performances ==
Dylan has performed the song live 88 times up to July 2009. The first time was on April 18, 1976, at Civic Centre, Lakeland, Florida; the most recent live performance (as of May 2021) was on July 4, 2009, at Coveleski Stadium, South Bend, Indiana. The debut live performance was acoustic, and featured new lyrics, which Heylin has described as delivered as if "revenge sat in his soul". Trager has said the performance shows the narrator "haunted by the woman ... hating himself for granting her an upper hand".

Live performances of the song in 1996 garnered positive reviews, with a syndicated article in Canada from April stating "his voice [was] sounding beautiful on the Dylan Scale, which is a different measurement than that applied to other singers", and Dave Ferman's October review in the Fort Worth Star-Telegram writing that the song gained from "a sparkling country rock arrangement" and observing how Dylan's delivery gave it "a heart-rending, poignant quality that actually outran the 21-year-old recorded version". In 2002, Sean O'Hagan of The Observer was unimpressed by "a spiteful take … [with] the regretful tenderness of the original replaced by late-blooming bitterness", which featured a lyrical change to "If she's passing back this way / That would be too quick / Don't mention her name to me / Cos that's a name that makes me sick".

== In popular culture ==
Bob Geldof used the title as the opening line to his composition "A Gospel Song" from his 1990 album The Vegetarians of Love. A fragment of the song is sung by David Duchovny's character in the series Californication, who describes the album as a "real heartbreak album". In an interview with The Guardian, Ricky Gervais mentioned the song as the last he ever played while working at Xfm. He also named Blood on the Tracks as his favorite album of all time. (Note: The article published in the print edition wrongly named the song as "If You See A Sailor") The song is played in the closing scene of the "Vesuvius" episode in the 9th season of How I Met Your Mother.

== Official album releases ==
Releases for "If You See Her, Say Hello"
	Album	Release year	Recorded at	Recording date	Take/ version	Personnel	Ref.
1	Blood on the Tracks	1975	Sound 80	December 30, 1974		Bob Dylan: vocals, guitar, harmonica; Kevin Odegard: guitar; Chris Weber: guitar; Gregg Inhofer: keyboards; Billy Peterson: bass; Bill Berg: drums	
2	The Bootleg Series Volumes 1–3 (Rare & Unreleased) 1961–1991	1991	A&R Studios	September 16, 1974	2	Bob Dylan: vocals, guitar, harmonica	
3 (Note: Also on deluxe edition)	The Bootleg Series Vol. 14: More Blood, More Tracks	2018	A&R Studios	September 16, 1974	1	Bob Dylan: vocals, guitar, harmonica	
4	The Bootleg Series Vol. 14: More Blood, More Tracks (Deluxe edition)	2018	A&R Studios	September 16, 1974	1	Bob Dylan: vocals, guitar, harmonica	
5 (Note: Previously released on The Bootleg Series Volumes 1–3 (Rare & Unreleased) 1961–1991)	The Bootleg Series Vol. 14: More Blood, More Tracks (Deluxe edition)	2018	A&R Studios	September 16, 1974	2	Bob Dylan: vocals, guitar, harmonica	
6 (Note: Previously released on Blood on the Tracks test pressing)	The Bootleg Series Vol. 14: More Blood, More Tracks (Deluxe edition)	2018	A&R Studios	September 19, 1974	Take 1, Remake	Bob Dylan: vocals, guitar, harmonica; Tony Brown: bass	
7 (Note: Previously released on Blood on the Tracks)	The Bootleg Series Vol. 14: More Blood, More Tracks (Deluxe edition)	2018	Sound 80	December 30, 1974		Bob Dylan: vocals, guitar, harmonica; Kevin Odegard: guitar; Chris Weber: guitar; Gregg Inhofer: keyboards; Billy Peterson: bass; Bill Berg: drums	
8	Bob Dylan – The Rolling Thunder Revue: The 1975 Live Recordings (Deluxe edition)	2019	S.I.R. Rehearsals, New York	October 21, 1975		Bob Dylan – vocals, guitar, piano, harmonica; Bobby Neuwirth: guitar, vocals; Scarlet Rivera: violin; T Bone J. Henry Burnett: guitar, vocals; Steven Soles: guitar, vocals; Mick Ronson: guitar; David Mansfield: steel guitar, mandolin, violin, dobro; Rob Stoner: bass guitar, vocals; Howie Wyeth: drums, piano; Luther Rix: drums, percussion, congas; Ronee Blakley: vocals; Ramblin' Jack Elliott: vocals, guitar; Allen Ginsberg: vocals, finger cymbals; Joni Mitchell: vocals	

== Cover versions ==
An Italian version of the song was recorded by singer-songwriter Francesco De Gregori, titled "Non Dirle Che Non È Così", for his album La valigia dell'attore that appears on the Masked and Anonymous soundtrack (2003). It has also been covered by Jeff Buckley, on his EP Live at Sin-é (1993), by Brazilian singer Renato Russo under the title of "If you see him, say hello", and by Mary Lee's Corvette as part of their cover of the entire Blood on The Tracks album in 2002.
