= Meet Me in the Morning =

1975 song by Bob Dylan

Song by Bob Dylan

from the album Blood on the Tracks
- Released: January 1975
- Recorded: September 16, 1974
- Studio: A&R Recording, New York City
- Genre: Blues rock
- Length: 4:22
- Label: Columbia
- Songwriter: Bob Dylan
- Producer: Bob Dylan

Blood on the Tracks track listing
- 10 tracks Side one: 1. "Tangled Up in Blue"; 2. "Simple Twist of Fate"; 3. "You're a Big Girl Now"; 4. "Idiot Wind"; 5. "You're Gonna Make Me Lonesome When You Go"; Side two: 6. "Meet Me in the Morning"; 7. "Lily, Rosemary and the Jack of Hearts"; 8. "If You See Her, Say Hello"; 9. "Shelter from the Storm"; 10. "Buckets of Rain"

"Meet Me in the Morning" is a blues song written by Bob Dylan, recorded in New York City on September 16, 1974, and released on his 15th studio album, Blood on the Tracks, in 1975.

== Composition and recording ==
"Meet Me in the Morning" is an acoustic blues performed with a full band and the only blues song on Blood on the Tracks. It is musically identical to another song, "Call Letter Blues", that Dylan had recorded earlier in the Blood on the Tracks sessions before rewriting the lyrics entirely. "Call Letter Blues" was eventually released on The Bootleg Series Volumes 1–3 (Rare & Unreleased) 1961–1991 in 1991.

The intersection mentioned in the song's first line, 56th and Wabasha, apparently does not exist. However, Minnesota Highway 56 and Wabasha Street in Saint Paul, Minnesota did intersect in 1974, when the song was recorded. This suggests that the lyric is "56 and Wabasha" rather than "56th and Wabasha" as the official Dylan website states.

== Personnel ==
- Bob Dylan – lead vocals, acoustic rhythm guitar
- Eric Weissberg – acoustic lead guitar
- Charles Brown III – electric guitar
- Buddy Cage – pedal steel guitar
- Thomas McFaul – keyboards
- Tony Brown – bass guitar
- Richard Crooks – drums

== Other versions ==
A September 19, 1974, outtake of "Meet Me in the Morning" was released on the B-side of the Record Store Day 2012 release of Dylan's single "Duquesne Whistle" and on the single-CD and 2-LP versions of The Bootleg Series Vol. 14: More Blood, More Tracks in 2018, with the complete recording sessions of the song included on the deluxe edition of that album.

== Live performance ==
On September 19, 2007, Dylan played the song live in concert for the first and, to date, only time, during a show in Nashville, Tennessee. He was joined onstage for the performance by Jack White of The White Stripes.

== Notable covers ==
Blues musician Freddie King recorded a version of "Meet Me in the Morning" on his 1975 album Larger Than Life, produced by Mike Vernon.

In 1980 Russian rock musician Mike Naumenko wrote a song "Позвони мне рано утром" (lit. Call me early in the morning) inspired by the Dylan song.

== In popular culture ==
"Meet Me in the Morning" is prominently featured in Sam Mendes' 2009 movie Away We Go.

The song can be heard in the background in the 2015 film Steve Jobs, during a scene where Jobs talks to his daughter.

The song can be heard in the 2014 climbing documentary Valley Uprising.

The song is used in the fourth episode of the 2024 Netflix miniseries, Eric.
