= Shelter from the Storm =

1975 song by Bob Dylan

Song by Bob Dylan

from the album Blood on the Tracks
- Released: January 1975
- Recorded: September 17, 1974
- Studio: A&R Recording, New York City
- Genre: Folk rock
- Length: 5:02
- Label: Columbia
- Songwriter: Bob Dylan
- Producer: Bob Dylan

Blood on the Tracks track listing
- 10 tracks Side one: 1. "Tangled Up in Blue"; 2. "Simple Twist of Fate"; 3. "You're a Big Girl Now"; 4. "Idiot Wind"; 5. "You're Gonna Make Me Lonesome When You Go"; Side two: 6. "Meet Me in the Morning"; 7. "Lily, Rosemary and the Jack of Hearts"; 8. "If You See Her, Say Hello"; 9. "Shelter from the Storm"; 10. "Buckets of Rain"

"Shelter from the Storm" is a song by Bob Dylan, recorded on September 17, 1974, and released on his 15th studio album, Blood on the Tracks, in 1975. It was later anthologized on the compilation album The Essential Bob Dylan in 2000.

== Composition and recording ==
Dylan recorded five takes of the song on September 17, 1974 at A&R Recording in New York City, with the fifth take the one that was included on Blood on the Tracks. Dylan sang, and played guitar and harmonica, accompanied by Tony Brown on bass. Both Robert Shelton and Oliver Trager describe the song's narrator's mood as "tempest-tossed", with Shelton saying that the song explores a "search for salvation through love" and has similarities to the work of W. B. Yeats, and Trager interpreting it as the narrator "taking stock of himself, the dangerous world around him, and his lost love".

The song opens with anachronistic language and Christian symbolism:

"'Twas in another lifetime, one of toil and blood
When blackness was a virtue, the road was full of mud
I came in from the wilderness, a creature void of form
'Come in,' she said, 'I'll give you shelter from the storm'"

Dylan scholar Tony Attwood calls the song a "complexly woven tale" that is "told around three chords". He notes that the same three chords repeat in every line of every verse, which culminates in the redemptive refrain "Come in, she said, I'll give you shelter from the storm". Attwood describes the story told in the song's lyrics thusly: "He finds her when he is nothing and has nothing or both, she welcomes him in, and he wanders off and loses her, much to his eternal regret".

In their book Bob Dylan All the Songs: The Story Behind Every Track, authors Philippe Margotin and Jean-Michel Guesdon note that Dylan's performance "oscillates between intimacy and declamation, and his performance is excellent, including short harmonica playing (in E)". They also note that the "excellent bass player Tony Brown", the only other musician on the track, "offers subtle and melodic playing" to accompany Dylan.

== Personnel ==
- Bob Dylan – lead vocals, acoustic guitar, harmonica
- Tony Brown – bass guitar

== Certifications ==
Region	Certification	Certified units/sales
New Zealand (RMNZ)	Gold	15,000^{‡}
United States (RIAA)	Platinum	1,000,000^{‡}
^{‡} Sales+streaming figures based on certification alone.

== Reception and legacy ==
Spectrum Culture included the song on a list of "Bob Dylan's 20 Best Songs of the '70s". In an article accompanying the list, critic Tyler Dunston credits Dylan for bringing out "the beauty and spirituality in pain, highlighting the terror that accompanies the greatest joy". He compares Dylan's vision of love to Rainer Maria Rilke's Duino Elegies for being "one in which pain and beauty, romance and faith are inextricable, almost indistinguishable, from one another".

Rolling Stone ranked the song 66th on a list of the "100 Greatest Bob Dylan Songs". A 2021 Guardian article included it on a list of "80 Bob Dylan songs everyone should know".

== Other versions ==
The first take of the song, from the same recording session that produced the album track, was released on the soundtrack to the 1996 motion picture Jerry Maguire. The same take was also featured on The Best of Bob Dylan the following year. This take and three others are included in the 2018 deluxe edition of The Bootleg Series Vol. 14: More Blood, More Tracks, (with Take 2 included on its single-CD and 2-LP versions).

== Live performances ==
According to his official website, Dylan played the song 376 times between 1976 and 2015. Live versions of the song have officially released on the albums Hard Rain in 1976 and Bob Dylan at Budokan in 1979. Dylan's live performance debut of the song during the Rolling Thunder Revue tour was described by Trager as having a "blustery, metallic edge complete with screeching electric guitar crescendos". During Dylan's 1978 World Tour, a saxophone part played by Steve Douglas and backing vocals featured in the renditions. Trager criticized the "emotionless lead vocal and sax solo" from the 1978 tour, while Paul Williams felt that the saxophone and backing vocalists failed to match the intensity of Dylan's singing.

== Notable covers ==
Jimmy Lafave recorded the song on his 1992 live record Austin Skyline. The song was covered by Manfred Mann's Earth Band, released on their 1996 studio album Soft Vengeance. The song has also been covered by jazz singer Cassandra Wilson on Belly of the Sun released in 2002. Soul Flower Union as 嵐からの隠れ家 (Arashi kara no Kakurega) covered the song on their 2002 studio album Love ± Zero. Rodney Crowell covered the song, with Emmylou Harris, for Crowell's 2005 album The Outsider. In 2006, English singer-songwriter Steve Adey reinterpreted the song, slowing it down to a funeral pace. Adey's version made The Times top songs of 2006. Pakistan's Sachal Jazz Ensemble, with guest Becca Stevens, recorded the song with sitar and other traditional instruments for their album Song of Lahore (Universal, 2016).

Bill Murray sings along to the song in its entirety in the film St. Vincent. Chris Martin of the band Coldplay performed a solo acoustic version of the song in the Saturday Night Live at Home episode of Saturday Night Live on April 11, 2020.
