= Buckets of Rain =

1975 song by Bob Dylan

Song by Bob Dylan

from the album Blood on the Tracks
- Released: January 1975
- Recorded: September 19, 1974
- Studio: A&R Recording, New York City
- Genre: Contemporary folk
- Length: 3:22
- Label: Columbia
- Songwriter(s): Bob Dylan
- Producer(s): Bob Dylan

Blood on the Tracks track listing
- 10 tracks Side one: 1. "Tangled Up in Blue"; 2. "Simple Twist of Fate"; 3. "You're a Big Girl Now"; 4. "Idiot Wind"; 5. "You're Gonna Make Me Lonesome When You Go"; Side two: 6. "Meet Me in the Morning"; 7. "Lily, Rosemary and the Jack of Hearts"; 8. "If You See Her, Say Hello"; 9. "Shelter from the Storm"; 10. "Buckets of Rain"

"Buckets of Rain" is a song by Bob Dylan, recorded on September 19, 1974, in New York City and released in 1975 on Dylan's critically acclaimed album Blood on the Tracks.

A September 18, 1974, outtake of the song was released in 2018 on the single-CD and two-LP versions of The Bootleg Series Vol. 14: More Blood, More Tracks, with the complete recording sessions released on the deluxe edition of that album.

== Background ==
In the officially released studio recording, "Buckets of Rain" is played in the key of E major. There are only two instruments: acoustic guitar and bass guitar. The guitar is not in standard tuning; rather, it is in "Open E" tuning.

Lyrically, "Buckets of Rain" is relatively simple, with five short verses addressing a lover. Oliver Trager describes the song thus:

Closing an otherwise desperate album with a light reappraisal of commitment, "Buckets of Rain" is a final, Sinatra-like tip of the hat sung with the playfulness of an old Piedmont songster. Though Dylan seems to liken the relationship he describes here with the ferocity of a deluge, he plaintively sings to his love, describing in light, sensual brushstrokes why he still finds her special. (88)

The melody is nearly identical to that of the 1972 song "Seaside Shuffle" written by English musician Jona Lewie and recorded that year under the band name "Terry Dactyl and the Dinosaurs" although the mood and style of the two songs are very different.

== Personnel ==
- Bob Dylan – lead vocals, acoustic guitar
- Tony Brown – bass guitar

== Reception and legacy ==
Spectrum Culture included "Buckets of Rain" on a list of "Bob Dylan's 20 Greatest Songs of the 1970s". In an article accompanying the list, critic Jacob Nierenberg notes that, in spite of being known as the "spokesman of a generation", Dylan sounds on the song "like a man who wants to be nothing more than a man, to process his emotions and remind himself of the things he loves about the woman he loves. 'I like your smile/ And your fingertips/ I like the way that you move your hips/ I like the cool way you look at me', Dylan croons—a heartfelt sentiment from a man who isn’t known for heartfelt sentiments.

The Big Issue placed it at #48 on a 2021 list of the "80 best Bob Dylan songs - that aren't the greatest hits".

Actress Julia Roberts has cited Dylan as her favorite singer and "Buckets of Rain" as her favorite song.

Stereogum ran an article to coincide with Dylan's 80th birthday on May 24, 2021 in which 80 musicians were asked to name their favorite Dylan song. Black Midi's Geordie Greep selected "Buckets of Rain" noting that the "words are sparse and natural, strengthened in their purity by his undeniably emotive performance. While not a complicated narrative or vividly painted scenario like some other songs on the album, the track still makes room for some dynamite lines. One example being, 'Everything about you is bringing me misery', which, coming as it does after a string of compliments to the unnamed second person, is a punchline almost as hilarious as it is devastating. Wonderful song".

== Live performance ==
According to his website, Dylan has only played the song once live: on November 18, 1990, at the Fox Theatre in Detroit, Michigan.

== Covers ==
"Buckets of Rain" has been covered by many musicians, including:

- Bette Midler: Songs for the New Depression (1976), in a duet with Bob Dylan.
- Happy Traum: American Stranger (1978), Bucket of Songs (1983)
- Wendy Bucklew: The Times They Are A-Changin' (1992), After You (2002)
- Jimmy LaFave: Road Novel (1998)
- Steve Howe: Portraits of Bob Dylan (1999)
- Mary Lee's Corvette: Blood on the Tracks (2002)
- various artists (performed by Bette Midler): Doin' Dylan 2 (2002)
- various artists (performed by Wendy Bucklew): May Your Song Always Be Sung: The Songs of Bob Dylan, Volume 3 (2003)
- Neko Case: Live from Austin, TX (Neko Case album) (2003)
- Beth Orton and M. Ward: "Confidentially Speaking" live recording @ "Largo" Los Angeles, CA; September 30, 2003.
- Dave Van Ronk: Dave Van Ronk: ...And the Tin Pan Bended and the Story Ended... (2004)
- Redbird: Redbird (2005)
- various artists (performed by Neko Case): Sweetheart 2005: Love Songs (2005)
- Chris Martin at the Union Chapel, London, November 27, 2006. (Martin then dedicated it to Lily Allen.)
- Eric Bibb: Diamond Days (2006)
- Lana Del Rey live (2006)
- John Renbourn: So Early in the Spring (2006)
- Martin Simpson at the Union Chapel, London, November 13, 2007.
- The Wood Brothers: Loaded (2008)
- Danny Schmidt: Man of Many Moons (2011)
- David Gray: During many live concerts.
- Fistful Of Mercy on the compilation "Chimes of Freedom: Songs of Bob Dylan Honoring 50 Years of Amnesty International" (2012)
- Tim Armstrong, as a part of his Tim Timebomb and Friends project (2012)
- The Waterboys, as part of their Fisherman's Box, a box set of recordings from their Fisherman's Blues sessions for the Fisherman's Blues album. (2013 release but recorded between 30 March to 2 June 1988)
- John Mayer, played at a private event in Santa Monica at Casa Del Mar, February 19, 2015.
- Joan Osborne, on her album “Songs of Bob Dylan” (2017)
- Thurston Moore for the "Dylan Revisited" covers album, included in CD form for Uncut magazine's June 2021 edition to coincide with Dylan's 80th birthday.
- Anna Elizabeth Laube, as a single, “Buckets Of Rain” (2022)
- Martin Simpson: Skydancers 2024
- 2025 - John Greene, Sunburn for the Soul
