= Lily, Rosemary and the Jack of Hearts =

1975 song by Bob Dylan

Song by Bob Dylan

from the album Blood on the Tracks
- Released: January 1975
- Recorded: December 30, 1974
- Studio: Sound 80, Minneapolis, Minnesota
- Genre: Folk rock; country blues
- Length: 8:51
- Label: Columbia
- Songwriter: Bob Dylan
- Producer: Bob Dylan

Blood on the Tracks track listing
- 10 tracks Side one: 1. "Tangled Up in Blue"; 2. "Simple Twist of Fate"; 3. "You're a Big Girl Now"; 4. "Idiot Wind"; 5. "You're Gonna Make Me Lonesome When You Go"; Side two: 6. "Meet Me in the Morning"; 7. "Lily, Rosemary and the Jack of Hearts"; 8. "If You See Her, Say Hello"; 9. "Shelter from the Storm"; 10. "Buckets of Rain"

"Lily, Rosemary and the Jack of Hearts" is an epic narrative ballad by the American singer-songwriter Bob Dylan released as the seventh song (or the second track on Side Two of the vinyl) on his 1975 album Blood on the Tracks. It is known for its complex plot and nearly nine-minute running time. It is one of five songs on Blood on the Tracks that Dylan initially recorded in New York City in September 1974 and then re-recorded in Minneapolis in December that year; the latter version became the album track.

== Characters and plot ==
The song features a large cast of characters and an elliptical plot:

=== Characters ===
- The main character in the song is "The Jack of Hearts", who has recently come into town as a leader of a gang of bank robbers. ("The boys finally made it through the wall and cleaned out the bank safe... but they couldn't go no further without the Jack of Hearts".)
- The female protagonists are Lily and Rosemary. Both are referred to in royal terms ("like a queen without a crown" and "Lily was a princess"). Rosemary is Big Jim's long-suffering wife and is ultimately executed for his murder. Lily is a dancer who is Big Jim's mistress (wearing a ring symbolizing this) and also a former lover of the Jack of Hearts.
- Big Jim is the wealthiest person in town: "He owned the town's only diamond mine" (i.e. he is the "King" of Diamonds). He is married to Rosemary and having a longstanding affair with Lily. He is killed at the climax of the song, though Dylan leaves it ambiguous who does the deed. The lyrics describe Big Jim as a greedy man who destroys all that he touches.
- The Hanging Judge; a patron of the bar where the plot plays out. The character is referred to as a drunk and is intoxicated for the bulk of the song. However, he is "sober" the next day when he oversees Rosemary being executed for Big Jim's death.

=== Plot ===
The song takes place in a cabaret in an unnamed town where most of the residents "with any sense" have already left. The town's bank is being targeted by a gang of thieves led by an enigmatic figure called "The Jack of Hearts". The Jack of Hearts appears inside the cabaret right before the show. Big Jim and his wife Rosemary are in attendance of the show, though they arrive separately and it is apparent that Big Jim intends to use the night to pursue his affair with Lily. After her performance, Lily meets the Jack of Hearts in her dressing room with romantic intentions, but Big Jim makes his way to the dressing room as well, followed by Rosemary who has been driven to despair by her years of mistreatment at the hands of Big Jim. Big Jim is going to shoot the Jack of Hearts but is killed by a penknife in the back wielded by Rosemary (her "one good deed before she dies"). "The next day", Rosemary is executed, a hanging overseen by "the hanging judge", another figure in town who is in attendance at the cabaret the night before.

The fate of the Jack of Hearts is left ambiguous. He is described at the end of the song only as "missing", as Rosemary is on the gallows, his gang across the river with the safe from the bank, and Lily contemplating the events of her life.

=== Extra verse ===
There is an extra verse on the Bob Dylan website and in the published sheet music that is not in the album version (right after the "backstage manager" verse):

Lily's arms were locked around the man that she dearly loved to touch,
She forgot all about the man she couldn't stand who hounded her so much.
"I've missed you so," she said to him, and he felt she was sincere,
But just beyond the door he felt jealousy and fear.
Just another night in the life of the Jack of Hearts.

This verse was recorded during the album's New York sessions and can be found on the deluxe version of The Bootleg Series Vol. 14: More Blood, More Tracks. This version is slower and more somber, even mournful, reflecting the approach of the other New York sessions. The version on Blood on the Tracks was recorded later, in Minneapolis, and reflects Dylan's attempts, following his brother's advice, to make the album less difficult and intense. The verse also appears in Joan Baez's cover of the song.

== Personnel ==
- Bob Dylan – lead vocals, acoustic rhythm guitar, harmonica
- Chris Weber – acoustic rhythm guitar
- Gregg Inhofer – hammond organ
- Billy Peterson – bass guitar
- Bill Berg – drums

== Reception and interpretations ==
According to Tim Riley of National Public Radio, "'Lily, Rosemary and the Jack of Hearts' is an intricately evasive allegory about 'romantic facades' that hide 'criminal motives', and the way one character's business triggers a series of recriminations from people he doesn't even know".

In their book Bob Dylan All the Songs: The Story Behind Every Track, authors Philippe Margotin and Jean-Michel Guesdon note that the "protagonists seem to play with their life as if it were a game of chance. Love is seen as comedy, life as a game of a chance. There is no doubt about what Dylan thought of justice, embodied by an alcoholic judge, imposing sentences with merciless severity".

Dylan scholar Tony Attwood sees it as a Western ballad, the "American Wild West" period setting of which "sets it completely apart" from any of the other songs on Blood on the Tracks, but he also notes that it is a "superb song, a brilliant example of how to tell a story in a song".

Critic Dale Nickey cited it in 2013 as being the "greatest 'story song' yet written".

== Other versions ==
The New York recording session of "Lily, Rosemary and the Jack of Hearts" was released on the deluxe edition of The Bootleg Series Vol. 14: More Blood, More Tracks in 2018, with the second take of the song also included on the single-CD and 2-LP versions of the album. The deluxe version of The Bootleg Series Vol. 14 also included a remix of the December 1974 master issued on Blood on the Tracks.

== Live performance ==
Dylan reportedly performed the song on May 25, 1976 in Salt Lake City, which was the final show of the Rolling Thunder Revue tour. This show was not recorded by Dylan's crew, and no bootleg recording has ever surfaced, despite search efforts from fans. The song was allegedly performed as a duet between Dylan and Joan Baez. Dylan scholar Ray Padgett, analysing the final concert of the Rolling Thunder Revue at Salt Lake City, includes a YouTube fragmentary audio clip of Dylan and Baez singing part of "Lily, Rosemary and the Jack of Hearts". Padgett asserts that this clip is not from the concert performance but from a prior rehearsal.

== Covers ==
- Baez included a performance of "Lily, Rosemary and the Jack of Hearts" on her 1976 live album From Every Stage. This includes the extra verse from Dylan's first recording.
- In 2002, Mary Lee's Corvette included "Lily, Rosemary and the Jack of Hearts" in their song-for-song live cover performance of "Blood on the Tracks"
- American singer-songwriter Tom Russell recorded a cover of the song with Eliza Gilkyson and Joe Ely for his 2004 album, Indians Cowboys Horses and Dogs.
