= Last Thoughts on Woody Guthrie =

Poem written by American singer-songwriter Bob Dylan

Poem by Bob Dylan

from the album The Bootleg Series Volumes 1–3 (Rare & Unreleased) 1961–1991
- Released: March 26, 1991
- Recorded: April 12, 1963
- Genre: Spoken word; poetry
- Length: 7:08
- Label: Columbia
- Songwriter: Bob Dylan

"Last Thoughts on Woody Guthrie" is a poem by American singer-songwriter Bob Dylan, written in honor of his idol Woody Guthrie, who at the time was dying from Huntington's disease. It was recited live during his April 12, 1963 performance at New York City's Town Hall and was officially released in 1991 on The Bootleg Series Volumes 1–3 (Rare & Unreleased) 1961–1991 after circulating on bootleg releases for years.

The poem is essentially an analysis of hope. Dylan sets the scene by describing the stressors of everyday life and the myriad of challenging choices we have to make. These stimuli can cause us to feel alone, lost, and without direction. Dylan then explains the function of hope and how we need something to give our lives meaning. He finishes by suggesting that, for him, Woody Guthrie is as much a source of hope and beauty in the world as God, or religion. The poem's winding, stream-of-consciousness style has been compared to Dylan's 2016 Nobel Lecture.

Dylan's performance at the Town Hall on April 12 was also used to debut several new compositions, such as "Tomorrow Is a Long Time", "Dusty Old Fairgrounds", "Ramblin' Down Thru the World", and "Bob Dylan's New Orleans Rag". However, at the end of the concert, Dylan returned to the stage to recite one of his poems in public, "Last Thoughts on Woody Guthrie", which he has never done since. In his introduction, Dylan explained that he had written the piece after being asked to "write something about Woody...what does Woody Guthrie mean to you in twenty-five words" in the impending release of a book about Guthrie. He then explained that he "couldn't do it – I wrote out five pages and... I have it here...Have it here by accident, actually…"
