= Kevin Odegard =

American country singer (born 1950)

Kevin Odegard (born September 30, 1950) is an American singer-songwriter and guitarist. Odegard is best known for his involvement in the recording sessions for Bob Dylan's album "Blood on the Tracks."

== Early life and education ==
He grew up in Princeton, Minnesota. His father, Robert J. Odegard, was a farmer, businessman and executive director of the University of Minnesota Foundation, and served in the Minnesota House of Representatives 1958–1962. By junior high school he had decided that he wanted to be a singer-songwriter, motivated by Minnesota groups such as The Gestures and David Rivkin's Chancellors. A later impetus for his songwriting was listening to Dylan's Like a Rolling Stone in 1965. He dropped out of University of Minnesota, hitchhiked to Greenwich Village, sang in folk clubs, toured, had some air time, and had an album deal. After a year he could not make ends meet, and he took a day job as a Chicago and North Western Railway brakeman, returning to Minnesota. In late December 1974, watching an episode of "Kojak", he received a phone call. He thought it was from the railroad company, and only belatedly pick it up. The call was from David Zimmerman, Bob Dylan's younger brother. He had previously run into Dylan several times, including at High Holiday services and knew David and their mother. He describes himself as being in the "extended circle" of the family. David Zimmerman was his manager at the time; and, he played at a Zimmerman family wedding in early 1974 where he sang Forever Young, just released by Dylan who was just a few feet away.

== Work with Bob Dylan ==
David had an unusual request. Could he find a small body Martin guitar with gut strings. Zimmerman would not tell him why, but Odegard suspected it was for Bob, who frequently visited family over the holiday season. He found it quickly and was told to bring it to Studio 80 in Minneapolis the next day, and not tell anybody. Odegard learned the next day that Dylan was unhappy with five of the songs he had recorded in New York for a new album soon to be released, "Blood on the Tracks". Dylan and his brother felt the album lacked vitality, and a number of songs needed to be re-recorded. David had experience with the local Minnesota music scene, and with Odegard's assistance, a group of six young local musicians were assembled to be the backup band for the secret re-recording session. There were two sessions, Friday and Monday, December 27 and 29. Odegard did not play on Friday; he asked to sit in on a session on the second day, and he played guitar on Tangled Up In Blue. After an early take on this recording, Dylan, "a home-boy open for suggestions," asked Odegard what he thought; Odegard said it was passable, but recommended that the song be sped up; and, for Dylan to pitch his voice up a key, from G to A, which Dylan did. Odegard observed that it gave the song more urgency, and "Bob started reaching for the notes. It was like watching Charlie Chaplin as a ballet dancer." They did no further takes, Dylan liked it, and the session moved on to the next song. The five cuts the group did have been called the heart and soul of the album. Blood in the Tracks is the best selling album of Dylan's career and ranked by Rolling Stone as one of the ten best of all time. Tangled Up in Blue has been considered a candidate for Dylan's greatest song.

== Later career ==
The album was released a month after the five songs were re-recorded. The musicians were told the record jackets had been printed and it was too late to change. Consequently, the six young Minnesota artists didn't get credit for their work. They were told the mistake would soon be fixed, but it was not updated on further releases. The label's refusal to identify these talented musicians, attributing the entire album to the New York musicians, was a frustrating and perplexing move that lasted for over four decades. Odegard felt an obligation to fix this, as he had brought in three of the band members. For years he worked for the change, and on the 2018 release of "More Blood, More Tracks", 43 years late, finally did the Minnesota musicians get their credits for the album.

He toured with the KO Band in the upper Midwest in the 1970s; members included Jeff Dayton, David Z and their drummer a young Bobby "Z" Rivkin.Odegard had a hit record in 1975, the title song of his second album, "Silver Lining," written and produced by David Z. It had national airplay and media interest. In 2009 it reconstituted as a Dylan tribute band fronted by a changing cast, including Odegard and several other members of Dylan's 1974 studio band. In 2005, he was inducted into the Minnesota Rock/Country Hall of Fame. In 2019, he donated the guitar he used on Blood on the Tracks to the Bob Dylan Center, a museum dedicated to Dylan's work, in Tulsa, Oklahoma.

He describes his experience playing guitar on Blood on the Tracks as "the defining moment of [his] journey into the music business proper." He later moved to Los Angeles. Needing a job, he started at the National Academy of Songwriters as a staff member, and became executive director 1984–1994. He notes that his lack of credit for Blood on the Tracks led him to become a strong advocate for protecting the rights and earnings of songwriters. With pop reviewer Andy Gill in 2004 he wrote A Simple Twist of Fate: Bob Dylan and the Making of "Blood on the Tracks", a description of the work at Studio 80 that led to the making of the album.

== Personal life ==
Odegard is retired, has two children and lives with his wife on a houseboat in Florida. In 2005, he was a member of a Temple Israel congregant humanitarian mission in Cuba, bringing 1000 pounds of medical supplies to the island, and, also, to support the Cuban Jewish community.
