= You're a Big Girl Now =

1975 song by Bob Dylan

Song by Bob Dylan

from the album Blood on the Tracks
- Released: January 1975
- Recorded: December 27, 1974
- Studio: Sound 80, Minneapolis, Minnesota
- Genre: Folk rock
- Length: 4:36
- Label: Columbia
- Songwriter: Bob Dylan
- Producer: Bob Dylan

Blood on the Tracks track listing
- 10 tracks Side one: 1. "Tangled Up in Blue"; 2. "Simple Twist of Fate"; 3. "You're a Big Girl Now"; 4. "Idiot Wind"; 5. "You're Gonna Make Me Lonesome When You Go"; Side two: 6. "Meet Me in the Morning"; 7. "Lily, Rosemary and the Jack of Hearts"; 8. "If You See Her, Say Hello"; 9. "Shelter from the Storm"; 10. "Buckets of Rain"

"You're a Big Girl Now" is a song by Bob Dylan, released on his 15th studio album, Blood on the Tracks, in 1975. It is one of five songs on the album that Dylan initially recorded in New York City in September 1974 and then re-recorded in Minneapolis in December that year. The latter recording, made on December 27, 1974, became the album track.

== Composition and recording ==
Like most songs on Blood on the Tracks, "You're a Big Girl Now" tells a story about two lovers that are breaking up. In the lyrics, the first-person narrator begs his lover to give him one more chance. Some critics have interpreted the song as being inspired by the tumult in Dylan's marriage to his then-wife Sara. Dylan vehemently denied this, however, in the liner notes to Biograph: “I read that this was supposed to be about my wife. I wish somebody would ask me first before they go ahead and print stuff like that. I mean, it couldn’t be about anybody else but my wife, right? Stupid and misleading jerks these interpreters sometimes are … I don’t write confessional songs. Emotions got nothing to do with it. It only seems so, like it seems that Laurence Olivier is Hamlet".

In their book Bob Dylan All the Songs: The Story Behind Every Track, authors Philippe Margotin and Jean-Michel Guesdon claim that the music in the song "carries the emotion. The melody reinforces this sense of melancholy, regret, and pain that emerges from the accompaniment. Dylan alternates between sweetness and power, and the intensity of every 'oh, oh' sounds almost like a complaint". They also note that, unlike the other full-band Minneapolis sessions for Blood on the Tracks, there is no bass player on the recording as Bill Peterson had already left the session "for an engagement in a jazz club".

== Personnel ==
- Bob Dylan – lead vocals, acoustic rhythm/lead guitar, harmonica
- Chris Weber – acoustic rhythm/lead guitar
- Greg Inhofer – piano
- Bill Berg – drums

== Critical reception and legacy ==
Rolling Stone ranked the song 91st on its list of the "100 Greatest Bob Dylan songs". In an accompanying article, the list asks, "Is there a more desperately lovesick moment in Dylan’s entire catalog than the point in this Blood on the Tracks gem when he croons, 'I can change, I swear', and then howls like a wounded dog? Maybe only later in the same song, when he talks of 'pain that stops and starts, like a corkscrew to my heart'. Dylan’s stunning first pass at this, the hushed New York outtake included on Biograph, sounds wounded. But here, the pain is even sharper".

The Big Issue placed the New York outtake version at #13 on a 2021 list of the "80 best Bob Dylan songs - that aren't the greatest hits" and noted that it "captures the sound of a heart being wrenched".

Bedouine cited it as her favorite Dylan song in a Stereogum article, noting that the "oh, oh" Dylan sings in every verse on the Blood on the Tracks version (which she refers to as a "sonic battle wound") elevates it above the New York outtake version: "The biggest distinction for me is him humming versus moaning the 'ohhh!' They’re both great but the latter has a visceral effect of longing like hunger pangs".

== Other versions ==
Individual outtakes of "You're a Big Girl Now" from the New York sessions were released in 1985 on the compilation Biograph and in 2018 on the single-CD and 2-LP versions of The Bootleg Series Vol. 14: More Blood, More Tracks, while the complete New York sessions were released on the deluxe edition of the latter album. The deluxe version of The Bootleg Series Vol. 14 also included a remix of the December 1974 master issued on Blood on the Tracks.

== Live performances ==
According to his official website, Dylan performed the song 212 times in concert between 1976 and 2007. A live version recorded in Fort Collins, Colorado on May 23, 1976, was officially released on the album Hard Rain.

== Cultural reference ==
The lyric "Love is so simple, to quote a phrase" refers to a line in Marcel Carné's Children of Paradise, one of Dylan's favorite movies: "You were right, Garance. Love is so simple". Dylan's painting teacher, Norman Raeben, had introduced him to the film shortly before he wrote the song.

== Cover versions ==
- The Sports on their 1981 EP The Sports Play Dylan (and Donovan)
- Hederos & Hellberg on their 2000 album Hederos & Hellberg
- Lloyd Cole on his 2001 studio album ETC
- Jimmy Lafave, by Lisa Miller on her 1996 album Quiet Girl with a Credit Card
- Zita Swoon on their 2006 album Camera Concert - A Band In A Box
- My Morning Jacket on the 2012 compilation album Chimes of Freedom: Songs of Bob Dylan Honoring 50 Years of Amnesty International.
- A version with Swedish lyrics "Du är en stor tjej nu" appears on the album Georga - Vid Grinden
- The song was covered by Emma Swift on her 2020 album Blonde on the Tracks.
- The Go-Betweens in a 1988 live version, later included on the bonus disc of 16 Lovers Lane
- Thalia Zedek on the "You're A Big Girl Now" EP (Acuarela/Kimchee Records, 2002)
