= Blood on the Tracks =

Studio album by Bob Dylan
- Released: January 20, 1975
- Recorded: September 16–19 and December 27–30, 1974
- Studios: A & R, New York City; Sound 80, Minneapolis
- Genres: Folk; folk rock
- Length: 51:46
- Label: Columbia
- Producers: Phil Ramone (New York; uncredited); Bob Dylan (Minneapolis; uncredited)

Bob Dylan chronology
| Before the Flood (1974) | Blood on the Tracks (1975) | The Basement Tapes (1975) |

Bob Dylan studio album chronology
| Planet Waves (1974) | Blood on the Tracks (1975) | The Basement Tapes (1975) |

Singles from Blood on the Tracks
- 1. "Tangled Up in Blue" Released: January 17, 1975

Blood on the Tracks is the fifteenth studio album by the American singer-songwriter Bob Dylan, released on January 20, 1975, by Columbia Records. The album marked Dylan's return to Columbia after two albums with Asylum Records. Dylan began recording the album at an A & R studio in New York City in September 1974. In December, shortly before Columbia was due to release the album, Dylan abruptly re-recorded much of the material in Sound 80 studio in Minneapolis. The final album contains five tracks recorded in New York and five from Minneapolis. The songs have been linked to tensions in Dylan's personal life, including his estrangement from his then-wife Sara. One of their children, Jakob Dylan, described the songs as "my parents talking". Dylan has denied that the songs were autobiographical.

Blood on the Tracks initially received mixed reviews, but has since been acclaimed by critics and fans as one of Dylan's best albums; various publications have listed it as one of the greatest albums of all time. It was a commercial success, peaking at No. 1 on the Billboard 200 and No. 4 on the UK Albums Chart; the single "Tangled Up in Blue" peaked at No. 31 on the Billboard Hot 100. It remains one of Dylan's best-selling studio releases, with a triple-platinum certification by the Recording Industry Association of America (RIAA) for at least three million copies sold in the United States. In 2015, it was inducted into the Grammy Hall of Fame.

Blood on the Tracks was voted number 7 in the third edition of Colin Larkin's book All Time Top 1000 Albums (2000). In 2003, the album was ranked number 16 on Rolling Stone's list of the “500 Greatest Albums of All Time”, rising to number 9 in the 2020 revision of the list. In 2004, it placed number 5 on Pitchfork's list of the "Top 100 Albums of the 1970s". A high-definition 5.1 surround sound edition of the album was released on SACD by Columbia in 2003.

== Background and recording ==
After his 1974 tour with the Band, Dylan began a relationship with a Columbia Records employee, Ellen Bernstein, which Dylan biographer Clinton Heylin has described as the beginning of the end of Dylan's marriage to his wife Sara. In spring 1974, Dylan spent several weeks in New York while he took art classes from the painter Norman Raeben. Dylan credited Raeben with transforming his understanding of time, and during the summer of 1974 he began to write songs using this new knowledge in three small notebooks:

[Raeben] taught me how to see ... in a way that allowed me to do consciously what I unconsciously felt ... when I started doing it, the first album I made was Blood on the Tracks. Everybody agrees that was pretty different, and what's different about it is there's a code in the lyrics, and also there's no sense of time.

Dylan subsequently spent time with Bernstein on his farm in Minnesota and there he completed the 17 songs from which Blood on the Tracks was formed—songs which Heylin has described as "perhaps the finest collection of love songs of the twentieth century, songs filled with the full spectrum of emotions a marriage on the rocks can engender".

Before recording the songs that would constitute Blood on the Tracks, Dylan previewed them for a number of friends in the music world, including David Crosby, Graham Nash, Stephen Stills, Tim Drummond and Peter Rowan. Nash recalled that Stills disliked Dylan's private performance of his new songs; immediately after Dylan left the room, Stills remarked to Nash, "He's a good songwriter ... but he's no musician."

Initially, Dylan considered recording Blood on the Tracks with an electric backing group, and contacted Mike Bloomfield who had played lead guitar on Dylan's Highway 61 Revisited album. When the two met, Dylan ran through the songs he was planning to record, but he played them too quickly for Bloomfield to learn. Bloomfield later recalled the experience: "They all began to sound the same to me; they were all in the same key; they were all long. It was one of the strangest experiences of my life. He was sort of pissed off that I didn't pick it up." In the end, Dylan rejected the idea of recording the album with a band, and instead substituted stripped-down acoustic arrangements for all of his songs. On August 2, 1974, Dylan signed a contract with Columbia Records. After releasing his two previous albums, Planet Waves and Before the Flood, on Asylum Records, Dylan decided his new album would benefit from the commercial muscle of the record label that had made him famous, and his new contract gave him increased control over his own masters.

Dylan commenced recording at A & R Recording Studios in New York City on September 16, 1974. Bernstein has stated "the theme of returning ran through the sessions", so "it made a lot of sense to do it at A&R". A & R Studios was the former Columbia Records "Studio A", where Dylan had recorded six albums in the 1960s. The musicians quickly realized that Dylan was taking a "spontaneous" approach to recording. The producer, Phil Ramone, later said that Dylan transitioned from one song to another as if they were part of a medley. Ramone noted: "Sometimes he will have several bars, and in the next version, he will change his mind about how many bars there should be in between a verse. Or eliminate a verse. Or add a chorus when you don't expect."

Eric Weissberg and his band, Deliverance, originally recruited as session men, were rejected after one day of recording because they could not keep up with Dylan's pace. Dylan retained bassist Tony Brown from the band, and soon added organist Paul Griffin (who had also worked on Highway 61 Revisited and Blonde on Blonde) and steel guitarist Buddy Cage. After ten days and four sessions with the current lineup, Dylan had finished recording and mixing, and, by November, had cut a test pressing of the album. Columbia began to prepare to release the album before Christmas.

Dylan played the test pressing for his brother, David Zimmerman, who persuaded Dylan the album would not sell because the overall sound was too stark. Robert Christgau also heard the early version of the album and called it "a sellout to the memory of Dylan's pre-electric period". At his brother's urging, Dylan agreed to re-record five of the album's songs in Sound 80 in Minneapolis, with backing musicians recruited by David. The new takes were accomplished in two days at the end of December 1974. Blood on the Tracks was released into stores on January 20, 1975. The version on the original test pressing was given a limited release in 2019 for Record Store Day.

=== Outtakes ===
The five New York acetate recordings that were replaced on the official album have been officially released on various archival releases, but only in 2019 did the original test pressing get officially released, as a limited-edition vinyl-only Record Store Day release. The acetate version of "You're a Big Girl Now" was released on 1985's Biograph. New York takes of "Tangled Up in Blue", "Idiot Wind", and "If You See Her, Say Hello" were released on The Bootleg Series, Vol. 1–3, but these were not the versions on the original test pressing. That collection also includes "Call Letter Blues", an outtake/early version of "Meet Me in the Morning" with alternate lyrics. "Up to Me", another outtake from these sessions, was also released on 1985's Biograph. An alternate take of the song "Shelter from the Storm" is featured in the original soundtrack album for Jerry Maguire (1996). An alternate take of "Meet Me in the Morning" was released on the B-side of the Record Store Day 2012 release of "Duquesne Whistle". The acetate versions of "Lily, Rosemary and the Jack of Hearts", "If You See Her, Say Hello", "Idiot Wind", and "Tangled Up in Blue" were not released officially until 2018, when they were released, alongside 70 previously unreleased recordings, on the 6-disc deluxe edition of More Blood, More Tracks, volume 14 of Dylan's ongoing archival Bootleg Series. Despite featuring multiple versions of nearly every song from the sessions, the actual mix found on the test pressing is not in the box set, and was only made available on the aforementioned 2019 reissue.

== Artwork and packaging ==
The front cover shows Bob Dylan in a portrait in profile looking to the left. To the left of this is a burgundy color strip with the artist's name and album title, both in white and underlined. While the cover image looks like a painting, it is a heavily edited photograph by Paul Till (who is credited accordingly). Till explained that the picture was taken with a telephoto lens at a concert at Maple Leaf Gardens, in Toronto on January 10, 1974. When developing the photo he solarized it, then hand colored it using watercolors, however Ron Coro, then the West Coast Art Director for Columbia Records states that he did not end up using the Paul Till solarized artwork and had used a blown up version of a 4" x 4" black and white printed photo that Bob Dylan had brought with him in case Ron wanted a copy of the original photo to use. The 4" x 4" print was blown up quite a bit and was extremely grainy. Ron had Bob's profile features retouched for better clarity and then recolored the print as close as possible to Paul Till's original for use as the final art. That final art and album cover design was then approved by Bob Dylan in a meeting that Ron Coro had with Bob at the historic CBS Building in Hollywood CA. At that meeting Bob was shown several layouts of the album package designed by Ron Coro and Bob approved one of the design choices as the final album cover and back cover layout. The original 4" x 4" black and white print was returned to Bob at that final meeting.

The backcover shows, depending on the edition, one of two lithographs by David Oppenheim. The main difference is between a version issued with and one issued without liner notes. The liner notes were written by Pete Hamill, then removed by Columbia Records for later 1975 pressings – which is when the lithograph was switched out – and then reinstated after Hamill was awarded a Grammy for his comments. There exist later issues of both versions of the back cover.

== Autobiographical interpretation ==
The songs that constitute Blood on the Tracks have been described by many Dylan critics as stemming from his personal turmoil at the time, particularly his estrangement from his then-wife Sara Dylan. One of Bob and Sara Dylan's children, Jakob Dylan, has said, "When I'm listening to Blood On The Tracks, that's about my parents."

Dylan has denied this autobiographical interpretation, stating in a 1985 interview with Bill Flanagan, "A lot of people thought that album pertained to me. It didn't pertain to me ... I'm not going to make an album and lean on a marriage relationship." Informed of the album's popularity, Dylan told Mary Travers in a radio interview in April 1975: "A lot of people tell me they enjoy that album. It's hard for me to relate to that. I mean ... people enjoying that type of pain, you know?" Addressing whether the album described his own personal pain, Dylan replied that he did not write "confessional songs". However, on the live At Budokan album, Dylan seems to acknowledge the autobiographical nature of the song "Simple Twist of Fate" by introducing it as "Here's a simple love story. Happened to me." In a 1978 interview, he responded to an observation that the album was confessional and that "Tangled Up in Blue" drew on his relationship with Sara by saying, "There might be some little part of me which is confessing something which I've experienced and I know, but is not definitely the total me confessing anything."

According to Rolling Stone, in Dylan's lyric notebook, the working title of "Simple Twist of Fate" was "4th Street Affair"; Dylan and Suze Rotolo lived at 161 W. 4th St. The narrator of the song memorializes an affair of ten years ago instead of singing about Dylan's marriage. In Hot Press, writing about the three known lyric notebooks for the songs, Anne Margaret Daniel noted that "Simple Twist of Fate" was first entitled "Snowbound", and set in part, like "Tangled Up in Blue", in a New York City apartment.

In his 2004 memoir, Chronicles, Vol. 1, Dylan stated that the songs have nothing to do with his personal life, and that they were inspired by the short stories of Anton Chekhov.

== Critical reception and legacy ==
Professional ratings
Review scores
| Source | Rating |
|---|---|
| AllMusic | 5/5 stars |
| Chicago Tribune | 4/4 stars |
| Encyclopedia of Popular Music | 5/5 stars |
| Music Story | 5/5 stars |
| MusicHound Rock | 5/5 |
| Pitchfork | 10/10 |
| Q | 5/5 stars |
| The Rolling Stone Album Guide | 5/5 stars |
| Sputnikmusic | 5/5 |
| The Village Voice | A |

Released in early 1975, Blood on the Tracks initially received mixed reviews from critics. Rolling Stone published two assessments. The first, by Jonathan Cott, called it "Dylan's magnificent new album". The second reviewer, Jon Landau, wrote that "the record has been made with typical shoddiness." In NME, Nick Kent described "the accompaniments [as] often so trashy they sound like mere practice takes", while Crawdaddy magazine's Jim Cusimano found the instrumentation incompetent.

An influential review of the album was written by Dylan critic Michael Gray for the magazine Let It Rock. Gray argued that it transformed the cultural perception of Dylan, and that he was no longer defined as "the major artist of the sixties. Instead, Dylan has legitimized his claim to a creative prowess as vital now as then—a power not bounded by the one decade he so affected." This view was amplified by Clinton Heylin, who wrote: "Ten years after he turned the rock & roll brand of pop into rock ... [Dylan] renewed its legitimacy as a form capable of containing the work of a mature artist." In The Village Voice, Robert Christgau wrote that although the lyrics occasionally evoke romantic naiveté and bitterness, Blood on the Tracks is altogether Dylan's "most mature and assured record".

Since its initial reception, Blood on the Tracks has been viewed by critics as one of Dylan's best albums. In Salon.com, Wyman wrote: "Blood on the Tracks is his only flawless album and his best produced; the songs, each of them, are constructed in disciplined fashion. It is his kindest album and most dismayed, and seems in hindsight to have achieved a sublime balance between the logorrhea-plagued excesses of his mid-1960s output and the self-consciously simple compositions of his post-accident years." Bell, in his critical biography of Dylan, wrote that Blood on the Tracks was proof that "Dylan had won the argument over his refusal to argue about politics. In this, he began to seem prescient." Bell concluded the album "might well count as one of the best things Dylan ever did". Novelist Rick Moody called it "the truest, most honest account of a love affair from tip to stern ever put down on magnetic tape".

A result of the acclaim surrounding the album has been that when critics have praised one of Dylan's subsequent albums, they have often described it as "his best since Blood on the Tracks". According to music journalist Rob Sheffield, Blood on the Tracks became a benchmark album for Dylan in the years that followed because it was "such a stunning comeback".

The album was also included in the book 1001 Albums You Must Hear Before You Die.

Hip hop group Public Enemy reference it in their 2007 Dylan tribute song "Long and Whining Road": "It Takes a Nation of Millions to Hold Us Back / You bet there's blood on them Bomb Squad tracks".

In 2018, it was announced that the film adaptation of the album was in pre-production, under the direction of Luca Guadagnino.

== Track listing ==
All tracks are written by Bob Dylan.

Side one
| No. | Title | Recorded | Length |
|---|---|---|---|
| 1. | "Tangled Up in Blue" | December 30, 1974, in Minneapolis | 5:42 |
| 2. | "Simple Twist of Fate" | September 19, 1974, in New York City | 4:19 |
| 3. | "You're a Big Girl Now" | December 27, 1974, in Minneapolis | 4:36 |
| 4. | "Idiot Wind" | December 27, 1974, in Minneapolis | 7:48 |
| 5. | "You're Gonna Make Me Lonesome When You Go" | September 17, 1974, in New York City | 2:55 |
| Total length: | | | 25:20 |

Side two
| No. | Title | Recorded | Length |
|---|---|---|---|
| 1. | "Meet Me in the Morning" | September 16, 1974, in New York City | 4:22 |
| 2. | "Lily, Rosemary and the Jack of Hearts" | December 30, 1974, in Minneapolis | 8:51 |
| 3. | "If You See Her, Say Hello" | December 30, 1974, in Minneapolis | 4:49 |
| 4. | "Shelter from the Storm" | September 17, 1974, in New York City | 5:02 |
| 5. | "Buckets of Rain" | September 19, 1974, in New York City | 3:22 |
| Total length: | | | 26:26 51:46 |

== Personnel ==
For personnel details, see Heylin, 1996 and Björner, 2014. Track numbers refer to CD and digital releases of the album.

=== Personnel ===
- Bob Dylan – lead vocals, acoustic guitar; mandolin (8); Hammond organ (4); harmonica (1–5, 7, 9)
- Chris Weber – acoustic guitar (1, 3, 4, 7); twelve-string guitar (8)^{[M]}
- Kevin Odegard – acoustic guitar (1)^{[M]}
- Eric Weissberg – acoustic guitar (6)^{[NY]}
- Charles Brown III – electric guitar (6)^{[NY]}
- Buddy Cage – pedal steel guitar (6)^{[NY]}
- Peter Ostroushko – mandolin (8)^{[M]}
- Gregg Inhofer – piano (3, 4); keyboards (1); Hammond organ (7, 8)^{[M]}
- Thomas McFaul – keyboards (6)^{[NY]}
- Billy Peterson – bass guitar (1, 4, 7)^{[M]}
- Tony Brown – bass guitar (2, 5, 6, 9, 10)^{[NY]}
- Bill Berg – drums (1, 3, 4, 7, 8)^{[M]}
- Richard Crooks – drums (6)^{[NY]}

=== Technical ===
- Bob Dylan – producer^{[M]}
- Phil Ramone – producer^{[NY]}
- Philip Rabinowitz – engineering^{[NY]}
- Paul Martinson – engineering^{[M]}
- Glenn Berger – tape operator, assistant engineer^{[NY]}
- Paul Till – photography
- Ron Coro – art direction
- Pete Hamill – liner notes
- David Oppenheim – illustrations

MInvolved in the Minneapolis recording sessions

NYInvolved in the New York recording sessions

== Cover albums ==
In 2002, Mary Lee's Corvette released an album covering Blood on the Tracks in its entirety.

In 2022, singer/songwriter Ryan Adams also released an album covering each song on the album track-by-track.

== Charts ==
=== Weekly charts ===
| Chart (1975) | Peak position |
|---|---|
| Canadian Albums (RPM) | 1 |
| Dutch Albums (Album Top 100) | 5 |
| German Albums (Offizielle Top 100) | 45 |
| New Zealand Albums (RMNZ) | 1 |
| Norwegian Albums (VG-lista) | 2 |
| Spanish Albums Chart | 3 |
| UK Albums (Official Charts) | 4 |
| US Billboard 200 | 1 |
| Chart (2000) | Peak position |
| Irish Albums (IRMA) | 38 |
| Chart (2019) | Peak position |
| Portuguese Albums (AFP) | 48 |

=== Year-end charts ===
| Chart (1975) | Position |
|---|---|
| Dutch Albums (Album Top 100) | 31 |
| UK Albums (OCC) | 49 |
| US Billboard 200 | 40 |

=== Singles ===
| Year | Single | Peak position |
| Year | Single | US |
|---|---|---|
| 1975 | "Tangled Up in Blue" | 31 |

== Certifications ==
| Region | Certification | Certified units/sales |
|---|---|---|
| Canada (Music Canada) | Platinum | 100,000^{^} |
| Italy | — | 100,000 |
| United Kingdom (BPI) | Platinum | 300,000^{^} |
| United States (RIAA) | 3× Platinum | 3,000,000^{‡} |
^{^} Shipments figures based on certification alone.^{‡} Sales+streaming figures based on certification alone.

== See also ==
- List of 1970s albums considered the best
