= From Every Stage =

Live album by Joan Baez
- Released: January 1976
- Recorded: July 25 to August 10, 1975
- Genre: Folk
- Length: 75:07
- Label: A&M
- Producer: David Kershenbaum

Joan Baez chronology
Diamonds & Rust (1975)	From Every Stage (1976)	Gulf Winds (1976)

Professional ratings
Review scores
Source	Rating
AllMusic	3/5 stars
Rolling Stone	(mixed)

From Every Stage is a double live album recorded by Joan Baez on tour in the summer of 1975. The first half of the album was acoustic, with Baez accompanying herself on her guitar, while the second half features electric backup. Baez' recording of "Blowin' in the Wind" from this album was later included in the Forrest Gump soundtrack. "Natalya" was dedicated to Russian poet and human rights activist Natalya Gorbanevskaya.

== Track listing ==
Disc One

1. "Ain't Gonna Let Nobody Turn Me 'Round" (Traditional)
2. "Blessed Are..." (Joan Baez)
3. "Suzanne" (Leonard Cohen)
4. "Love Song to a Stranger, Part Two" (Joan Baez)
5. "I Shall Be Released" (Bob Dylan)
6. "Blowin' in the Wind" (Bob Dylan)
7. "Stewball" (Traditional)
8. "Natalya" (R. Apps, G.T. Moore, Shusha Guppy)
9. "The Ballad of Sacco and Vanzetti" (Joan Baez, Ennio Morricone)
10. "Joe Hill" (Alfred Hayes, Earl Robinson)

Disc Two

1. "Love Is Just a Four-Letter Word" (Bob Dylan)
2. "Forever Young" (Bob Dylan)
3. "Diamonds & Rust" (Joan Baez)
4. "Boulder to Birmingham" (Emmylou Harris)
5. "Swing Low, Sweet Chariot" (Traditional)
6. "Oh Happy Day" (Edwin Hawkins)
7. "Please Come to Boston" (Dave Loggins)
8. "Lily, Rosemary and the Jack of Hearts" (Bob Dylan)
9. "The Night They Drove Old Dixie Down" (Robbie Robertson)
10. "Amazing Grace" (Traditional)

== Personnel ==
- Joan Baez – vocals, guitar
- David Briggs – keyboards
- Larry Carlton – guitar
- Dan Ferguson – guitar
- Jim Gordon – drums
- James Jamerson – bass

Technical

- Bernard Gelb - executive producer

Album credits state that the recordings were made in 1975 at Philadelphia Spectrum, July 25; Nassau Coliseum, July 26; Hollywood Bowl, August 6; Sacramento Convention Center, August 7; Berkeley Greek Theatre, August 9; and Monterey Peninsula College, August 10.

== Chart positions ==
Chart (1971)	Peak position
Canada Top Albums/CDs (RPM)	49
US Billboard 200	34
