= You're Gonna Make Me Lonesome When You Go =

1975 song by Bob Dylan

Song by Bob Dylan

from the album Blood on the Tracks
- Released: January 1975
- Recorded: September 17, 1974
- Studio: A&R Recording, New York City
- Genre: Folk rock
- Length: 2:54
- Label: Columbia
- Songwriter: Bob Dylan
- Producer: Bob Dylan

Blood on the Tracks track listing
- 10 tracks Side one: 1. "Tangled Up in Blue"; 2. "Simple Twist of Fate"; 3. "You're a Big Girl Now"; 4. "Idiot Wind"; 5. "You're Gonna Make Me Lonesome When You Go"; Side two: 6. "Meet Me in the Morning"; 7. "Lily, Rosemary and the Jack of Hearts"; 8. "If You See Her, Say Hello"; 9. "Shelter from the Storm"; 10. "Buckets of Rain"

"You're Gonna Make Me Lonesome When You Go" is a song by Bob Dylan. Recorded in September 1974, it appeared as the fifth track on Dylan's album Blood on the Tracks, released in January 1975.

== Background and composition ==
The song's lyrics have brought forth multiple interpretations—from the idea that they are confessional, to Dylan's claims that the album was inspired by literature, to the lyrics being called Dylan's most masterfully written love poem. Many believe the song describes Dylan's relationship issues with his wife during the time when they were separated. Additionally, Ellen Bernstein, a girlfriend of Dylan's in 1974 while he was separated from his wife, claims that the song was about their relationship.

However, in interviews Dylan claimed the song was inspired by literature. Rolling Stone reported that in Dylan's memoir, Chronicles: Volume One, "Dylan was assumed to be referring to Blood on the Tracks when he wrote: “I would even record an entire album based on Chekhov short stories. Critics thought it was autobiographical – that was fine”.

In the lines "Situations have ended sad / Relationships have all been bad / Mine’ve been like Verlaine’s and Rimbaud", the narrator compares his past relationships to the tumultuous two-year romance between French Symbolist poets Arthur Rimbaud and Paul Verlaine.

== Recording ==
The song was one of a few Dylan attempted to record with a full band (Eric Weissberg and Deliverance) at the album's initial September 1974 sessions in New York. Multiple versions were attempted, including a slow ballad arrangement, but ultimately Dylan opted - as he did with most of the tracks from these sessions - for a near-solo acoustic arrangement backed only by Deliverance bassist Tony Brown. The complete recording session of "You're Gonna Make Me Lonesome When You Go" was released in 2018 on the deluxe edition of The Bootleg Series Vol. 14: More Blood, More Tracks, with one outtake appearing on the 1-CD and 2-LP versions of that album.

== Personnel ==
- Bob Dylan – lead vocals, acoustic guitar, harmonica
- Tony Brown – bass guitar

== Reception and legacy ==
The Daily Telegraph described the song as the album's "simplest, breeziest song – yet it remains heartbreaking in its almost carefree surrender to the inevitability of romantic pain". Rolling Stone placed the song 56th on a list of the "100 Greatest Bob Dylan Songs". In an article accompanying the list, musician Jim James described the song as the "essence of love. He's describing everything so viscerally. I can almost smell the trees and different people I've known over the years, the flowers, the sunlight – the way things look when you're falling in love and how that turns in on itself when you have to leave or move on or life changes you or changes the other person. He's reflecting on it in such a beautiful way, saying that person will always be a part of him. He'll see her everywhere".

In spite of the fact that Dylan has not performed the song live since 1976, he did revisit it and drastically alter the lyrics for his "Mondo Scripto" art exhibition at the Halcyon Gallery in London in 2017. According to Tom Piazza's notes in the exhibition catalogue: "In their original recorded incarnation, the lyrics to this song are luminous with the sensuality of new love, intoxicated with its immediacy and worried that it won't last. In this almost wholly reimagined version, the poet is looking back from a distance at that love, with an older eye and a cagier relation to love's ups and downs. Dylan even throws in references to English poet John Milton, country music legends the Carter Family, and in the words 'footprints in the snow', throws a wink at bluegrass music patriarch Bill Monroe for good measure".

== Live performances ==
According to his official website, Dylan has performed the song only twelve times in concert. All performances took place during the second leg of the Rolling Thunder Revue in 1976: the first performance took place at the Starlight Ballroom in Clearwater, Florida on April 22 and the last performance took place at Salt Palace in Salt Lake City, Utah on May 22.

== Covers and references ==
Miley Cyrus (with Johnzo West) covered the song for Amnesty International on Chimes of Freedom: Songs of Bob Dylan Honoring 50 Years of Amnesty International. According to Sean Curnyn's review of the cover version, there were "an explosion of amateur performers on YouTube who have been inspired by Miley and are clearly doing their versions of her version." The album debuted in the U.S at number 11 on the Billboard 200, with 22,000 copies sold.

Elvis Costello covered the song on the bonus disk for his album Kojak Variety.

The song has been covered by many other artists including Madeleine Peyroux, Shawn Colvin, Raul Malo, Mary Lou Lord, Mary Lee's Corvette, Maria Muldaur, Naked Eyes, Bryan Sutton, Rhett Miller, and Ben Watt.

Saradha Koirala references the song in her novel Lonesome When You Go.
