= Idiot Wind =

1975 song by Bob Dylan

Song by Bob Dylan

from the album Blood on the Tracks
- Released: January 1975
- Recorded: 27 December 1974
- Studio: Sound 80, Minneapolis, Minnesota
- Genre: Folk rock
- Length: 7:48
- Label: Columbia
- Songwriter: Bob Dylan
- Producer: Bob Dylan

Blood on the Tracks track listing
- 10 tracks Side one: 1. "Tangled Up in Blue"; 2. "Simple Twist of Fate"; 3. "You're a Big Girl Now"; 4. "Idiot Wind"; 5. "You're Gonna Make Me Lonesome When You Go"; Side two: 6. "Meet Me in the Morning"; 7. "Lily, Rosemary and the Jack of Hearts"; 8. "If You See Her, Say Hello"; 9. "Shelter from the Storm"; 10. "Buckets of Rain"

"Idiot Wind" is a song by Bob Dylan, which appeared on his 1975 album Blood on the Tracks. He began writing it in 1974, after his comeback tour with the Band. Dylan recorded the song in September 1974 and re-recorded it in December 1974 along with other songs on his album Blood on the Tracks. Between the recordings, he often reworked the lyrics. A live version of the song was released on Dylan's 1976 album Hard Rain, and all of the studio outtakes from the September sessions were released on the deluxe edition of The Bootleg Series Vol. 14: More Blood, More Tracks in 2018.

Some reviewers have speculated that the song is a reflection on Dylan's personal life, and in particular, on his deteriorating relationship with his wife Sara Dylan. Dylan has denied that it is autobiographical. Like the album it was included on, the song received a mixed critical reception on release. Commentators have acclaimed both the lyrics and performance in the intervening years, and the song was given prominence from some critics' assessments as one of Dylan's best.

== Background and recording ==
The song was written in the summer of 1974, after Dylan's comeback tour with the Band that year and separation from Sara Dylan, whom he had married in 1965. Dylan had moved to a farm in Minnesota with his brother, David Zimmerman, and there started to write the songs that were recorded for his album Blood on the Tracks.

In the spring of 1974, Dylan had taken art classes at Carnegie Hall and was influenced by his tutor Norman Raeben and, in particular, Raeben's view of time. Dylan was later to say that "Idiot Wind" was "a song I wanted to make as a painting". "Idiot Wind" was a derogatory phrase employed by Raeben and this may have inspired Dylan's use of it, although the term also appears in the poem June 1940 by Weldon Kees and that may have been the reference point.

Dylan first recorded "Idiot Wind" in New York City on 16 September 1974 during the initial Blood on the Tracks sessions at A&R Studios. That December, working from a suggestion from his brother that the album should have a more commercial sound, Dylan re-recorded half the songs on Blood on the Tracks, including "Idiot Wind", in Minneapolis.

The recordings were engineered by Phil Ramone in New York and by Paul Martinson in Minneapolis. In New York, the songs were recorded in the key of E, with Dylan's guitar tuned to open D with a capo on the second fret, while the Minneapolis recordings are in standard tuning.

The re-recorded versions were radical departures from the original recordings, and each new recording included changes to the lyrics from the earlier versions. The September 1974 recording of "Idiot Wind" featured only acoustic guitar and bass accompaniment, with organ later overdubbed whereas the re-recording made on 27 December 1974 and issued on Blood on the Tracks, featured a full band. This group of local musicians had been hurriedly put together, and Dylan had not previously met them. Clinton Heylin recounts that Dylan frequently reworked the song from September to December. In a 1991 interview with Paul Zollo, Dylan said that there could be many more verses for the song and that it could be constantly reworked. Zollo contrasts the Blood on the Tracks version with the one from The Bootleg Series Volumes 1–3 (Rare & Unreleased) 1961–1991 which was Take 4, with added organ overdubs, recorded on 19 September 1974 in New York, and opines that the gentler delivery of the song in the September version "makes the inherent disquiet of the song even more disturbing".

Individual outtakes from the New York sessions were released in 1991 on The Bootleg Series Volumes 1–3 and in 2018 on the single-CD and 2-LP versions of The Bootleg Series Vol. 14, while the complete New York sessions were released on the deluxe edition of the latter album. The deluxe version of The Bootleg Series Vol. 14 also included a remix of the December 1974 master issued on Blood on the Tracks.

== Personnel ==
- Bob Dylan – lead vocals, acoustic rhythm guitar, Hammond organ, harmonica
- Chris Weber – acoustic rhythm guitar
- Greg Inhofer – piano
- Billy Peterson – bass guitar
- Bill Berg – drums

== Interpretations ==
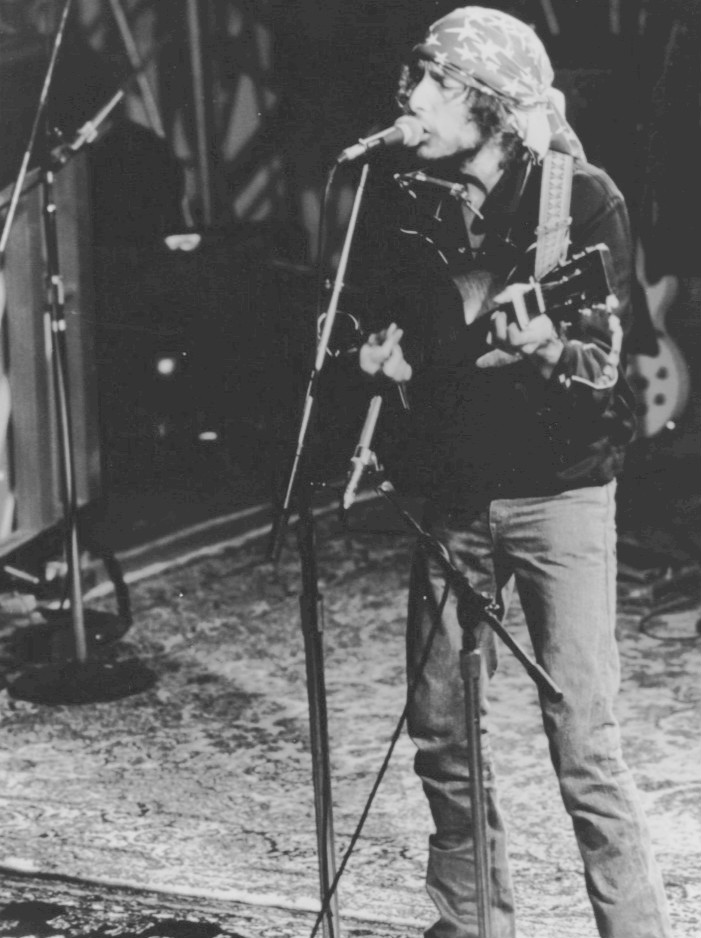
Dylan performing on May 23, 1976

Barbara O'Dair links the song to two of Dylan's other compositions, "Sad Eyed Lady of the Lowlands" (1966) and "Sara" (1976), as a set of songs written across ten years "addressing a woman that bears a resemblance to his now ex-wife Sara Lownds". (Note: Sara Dylan was known as Sara Lownds before marrying Bob Dylan.) O'Dair criticises the song for victim blaming. David Goldblatt and Edward Necarsulmer say that in the song, "Dylan explores the bitterness of resentment and revenge against a lover and one's own self who botched their love". Dylan has denied that the song is personal, stating in 1985 that:

I thought I might have gone a little bit too far with "Idiot Wind" ... I didn't really think I was giving away too much; I thought that it seemed so personal that people would think it was about so-and-so who was close to me. It wasn't ... I didn't feel that one was too personal, but I felt it seemed too personal. Which might be the same thing, I don't know.

Timothy Hampton takes the song as political, and a commentary on the Vietnam War, whereas David Dalton feels that Dylan draws parallels between his personal situation and the national one, and "turns his own fate into an allegory of a soured American dream".

Dylan and Lownds' relationship deteriorated in 1976, and David Kinney relates how Dylan played "Idiot Wind" in a show at Fort Collins while Lowndes was in the audience, noting in the following sentence that the pair were divorced the following year.

This live version from 23 May 1976 is included as the closing track to Hard Rain and was also included on the Dylan album Masterpieces that was released in Japan and Australia. It contained lyrical changes from the album version. Mick Farren's review of the album says that "It requires a considerable sleight of hand to get across the remorseless emotional attack of, say, 'Idiot Wind' without losing the party atmosphere. I haven't quite worked out how he managed it."

In a 1985 interview with Bill Flanagan, Dylan said that although many people thought that "Idiot Wind" and the album Blood on the Tracks related to his life, "It didn't pertain to me. It was just a concept of putting in images that defy time – yesterday, today and tomorrow. I wanted to make them all connect in some kind of a strange way." In his 2004 memoir Chronicles: Volume One, Dylan claimed that Blood on the Tracks was "an entire album based on Chekhov short stories—critics thought it was autobiographical—that was fine."

== Critical reception ==
The album Blood on the Tracks received mixed reviews on release. Rolling Stone carried two reviews. Jonathan Cott described the album as "magnificent and memorable" and "Idiot Wind", which was as accomplished as the other songs in his view, as "explosive and bitter". Cott observed that it was the first time that Dylan had included himself in a condemnation in one of his songs, with the line "We're idiots, babe/It's a wonder we can even feed ourselves". Meanwhile, in the other Rolling Stone review, Jon Landau disparaged "the childishness (without any redeeming childlike wonder) of so much of 'Idiot Wind'". Music critic Lester Bangs originally regarded the song as "ridiculously spiteful" and was unimpressed, although he soon found himself listening to the album frequently.

In his 2003 book Dylan's Visions of Sin, literary scholar Christopher Ricks discusses a particular lyrical couplet from the song, namely: "Blowing like a circle around my skull/From the Grand Coulee Dam to the Capitol". Ricks praises this as:

fierce ... And it's a true rhyme because of the metaphorical relation, because of what a head of state is, and the body politic, and because of the relation of the Capitol to the skull (another of those white domes), with which it disconcertingly rhymes. An imperfect rhyme, perfectly judged.

The same rhyme had impressed Allen Ginsberg, who wrote to Dylan comparing it to an image from The Bridge by Hart Crane. Dylan was apparently gratified to receive Ginsberg's letter, and it was a contributing factor in leading to Ginsberg being invited onto the Rolling Thunder Revue tour. In his 1976 review in The Village Voice, Paul Cowan also referred to these lyrics, saying that they evoked both Woody Guthrie in the language used and T. S. Eliot in the delivery of the vocal. Like Cott, Cowan noted the ultimately self-accusatory nature of the lyrics, which he felt provided a surprising conclusion to the song. The lyrics referencing the Capitol replaced the earlier "Idiot wind, blowing every time you move your jaw/From the Grand Coulee Dam to the Mardi Gras" used in New York. Zollo also felt that this pair of lines was the highlight of the song.

In his book 1001 Songs, Toby Creswell says that the track is an "epic of elegantly phrased bile" and is "not ... based on logical exposition". The song was 16th on American Songwriter magazine's 2009 ranking of The 30 Greatest Dylan Songs, and placed fourth in Jim Beviglia's 2013 book Counting Down Bob Dylan: His 100 Finest Songs. In a 2020 article for The Guardian, Alexis Petridis ranked it the third-greatest of Dylan's songs, praising it as "extraordinary, harrowing listening" and quoting the lyric "I haven't known peace and quiet for so long I can't remember what it's like", commenting "its author isn't just hurling bitter accusations, he's writhing in agony".

In a review of The Bootleg Series Vol. 14, Sean O'Hagan remarked of the song "By turns paranoid, derisory and vengeful, it is a dark masterpiece of venomous intent, a great part of its raw power resting in the very discomfort the listener feels as it gathers momentum and the tone becomes ever more bitter." When Dylan won the Nobel prize for literature in 2016, The Guardian cited "Idiot wind, blowing every time you move your teeth/ You're an idiot, babe/ It's a wonder that you still know how to breathe" from "Idiot Wind" as one of his greatest lyrics.

Edward Docx included it on the Guardian's 2021 list of "80 Bob Dylan songs everyone should know".

== Live performances ==
Dylan has performed the song live only 55 times. The first was on 18 April 1976 at Civic Centre, Lakeland, Florida. He retired the song from his setlist the following month and did not perform it again until April 1992, retiring it again in August of that year. In 1992, Clinton Heylin, a prolific author of material about Dylan, flew from England to California to attend Dylan's shows when he heard that "Idiot Wind" was being played live again.

== In popular culture ==
Artist Mohammad Omer Khalil produced a series of etchings, inspired by Dylan's music, that were displayed at the National Museum of African Art in 1994, including one entitled Idiot Wind. In a reply to a question on the "Ask Lou" section of his website in 2007, singer-songwriter Lou Reed picked "Idiot Wind" as the song he wished he had written. Novelist Peter Carey included "Idiot Wind" as one of his eight records for BBC Radio 4's Desert Island Discs in 2008.

Some of the lyrics of "Idiot Wind" are mentioned in the 1995 song "Only Wanna Be with You" by American band Hootie & the Blowfish. The use of Dylan's lyrics reportedly led to an out-of-court settlement, with Dylan receiving money from Hootie & the Blowfish. Swedish musician Amanda Bergman used to perform under the stage name Idiot Wind, after the song. Peter Kaldheim's 2019 novel Idiot Wind: A Memoir was published by Canongate.

The song appears in Conor McPherson's play Girl from the North Country. In the original 2017 London production at The Old Vic and the subsequent transfer to the West End it was sung by Sheila Atim, playing the role of Marianne Laine, as part of a medley with "Hurricane" and "All Along the Watchtower" sung by Arinzé Kene. Atim won the 2018 Laurence Olivier Award for Best Supporting Actress in a Musical for her role. The cast recording, recorded at Abbey Road Studios, includes the song in a medley performed by Atim and Kene, as per the original London production.

== Releases ==
The officially released versions of the song on Bob Dylan albums are below.

	Album	Release year	Recorded at	Recording date	Take	Personnel
1	Blood on the Tracks	1975	Sound 80	27 December 1974		Bob Dylan: vocals, guitar, harmonica, organ; Chris Weber: guitar; Gregg Inhofer: keyboards; Billy Peterson: bass; Bill Berg: drums
2	Hard Rain	1976	Hughes Stadium	23 May 1976		Bob Dylan: vocals, guitar, Scarlet Rivera: violin; T-bone J. Henry Burnett: guitar, piano; Steven Soles: guitar; Mick Ronson: guitar; Bobby Neuwirth: guitar, vocals; Roger McGuinn: guitar, vocals; David Mansfield: steel guitar, mandolin, violin, dobro; Rob Stoner: bass; Howie Wyeth: drums; Gary Burke: percussion
3 (Note: Previously released on Hard Rain. Masterpieces was released in 1978 in Japan and Australia.)	Masterpieces	1978	Hughes Stadium	23 May 1976		Bob Dylan: vocals, guitar, Scarlet Rivera: violin; T-bone J. Henry Burnett: guitar, piano; Steven Soles: guitar; Mick Ronson: guitar; Bobby Neuwirth: guitar, vocals; Roger McGuinn: guitar, vocals; David Mansfield: steel guitar, mandolin, violin, dobro; Rob Stoner: bass; Howie Wyeth: drums; Gary Burke: percussion
4	The Bootleg Series Volumes 1–3 (Rare & Unreleased) 1961–1991	1991	A&R Studios	19 September 1974	4 (remake) – with organ overdub	Bob Dylan: vocals, guitar, harmonica; Tony Brown: bass. Organ overdub by Paul Griffin.
5	The Bootleg Series Vol. 14: More Blood, More Tracks	2018	A&R Studios	19 September 1974	4	Bob Dylan: vocals, guitar, harmonica; Tony Brown: bass
6	The Bootleg Series Vol. 14: More Blood, More Tracks (Deluxe edition)	2018	A&R Studios	16 September 1974	1	Bob Dylan: vocals, guitar, harmonica; Tony Brown: bass
7	The Bootleg Series Vol. 14: More Blood, More Tracks (Deluxe edition)	2018	A&R Studios	16 September 1974	1 (remake)	Bob Dylan: vocals, guitar, harmonica; Tony Brown: bass
8	The Bootleg Series Vol. 14: More Blood, More Tracks (Deluxe edition)	2018	A&R Studios	16 September 1974	3 (with insert)	Bob Dylan: vocals, guitar, harmonica; Tony Brown: bass
9	The Bootleg Series Vol. 14: More Blood, More Tracks (Deluxe edition)	2018	A&R Studios	16 September 1974	5	Bob Dylan: vocals, guitar, harmonica; Tony Brown: bass
10	The Bootleg Series Vol. 14: More Blood, More Tracks (Deluxe edition)	2018	A&R Studios	16 September 1974	6	Bob Dylan: vocals, guitar, harmonica; Tony Brown: bass
11	The Bootleg Series Vol. 14: More Blood, More Tracks (Deluxe edition)	2018	A&R Studios	19 September 1974	Rehearsal and Takes 1–3, Remake	Bob Dylan: vocals, guitar, harmonica; Tony Brown: bass
12	The Bootleg Series Vol. 14: More Blood, More Tracks (Deluxe edition)	2018	A&R Studios	19 September 1974	4 (remake)	Bob Dylan: vocals, guitar, harmonica; Tony Brown: bass
13 (Note: Previously released on The Bootleg Series Volumes 1–3 (Rare & Unreleased) 1961–1991)	The Bootleg Series Vol. 14: More Blood, More Tracks (Deluxe edition)	2018	A&R Studios	19 September 1974	4 (remake) – with organ overdub	Bob Dylan: vocals, guitar, harmonica; Tony Brown: bass
14 (Note: Previously released on Blood on the Tracks)	The Bootleg Series Vol. 14: More Blood, More Tracks (Deluxe edition)	2018	Sound 80	27 December 1974		Bob Dylan: vocals, guitar, harmonica, organ; Chris Weber: guitar; Gregg Inhofer: keyboards; Billy Peterson: bass; Bill Berg: drums
15	The Music Which Inspired Girl From The North Country	2018	Sound 80	27 December 1974		Bob Dylan: vocals, guitar, harmonica, organ; Chris Weber: guitar; Gregg Inhofer: keyboards; Billy Peterson: bass; Bill Berg: drums

== Covers ==
Mary Lee's Corvette covered the entire Blood on The Tracks album in 2002, including "Idiot Wind". A cover of "Idiot Wind" was included on the Coal Porters album How Dark This Earth Will Shine.
