= Tangled Up in Blue =

1975 song by Bob Dylan

Single by Bob Dylan

from the album Blood on the Tracks
- B-side: "If You See Her, Say Hello"
- Released: January 20, 1975
- Recorded: December 30, 1974
- Studio: Sound 80 (Minneapolis, Minnesota)
- Genre: Folk rock
- Length: 5:41
- Label: Columbia
- Songwriter: Bob Dylan
- Producer: David Zimmerman (uncredited)

Bob Dylan singles chronology
"It Ain't Me Babe (Live)" (1974)	"Tangled Up in Blue" (1975)	"Million Dollar Bash" / "Tears of Rage" (1975)

Blood on the Tracks track listing
- 10 tracks Side one: 1. "Tangled Up in Blue"; 2. "Simple Twist of Fate"; 3. "You're a Big Girl Now"; 4. "Idiot Wind"; 5. "You're Gonna Make Me Lonesome When You Go"; Side two: 6. "Meet Me in the Morning"; 7. "Lily, Rosemary and the Jack of Hearts"; 8. "If You See Her, Say Hello"; 9. "Shelter from the Storm"; 10. "Buckets of Rain"

Music video
- "Tangled Up in Blue" (live) on YouTube

"Tangled Up in Blue" is a song by American singer-songwriter Bob Dylan. The opening track of his 15th studio album Blood on the Tracks (1975), the song was released as the album's sole single and reached No. 31 on the Billboard Hot 100. Written by Dylan and produced by his brother David Zimmerman, the song concerns relationships from different narrative perspectives. Dylan has altered the lyrics in subsequent performances, changing the point of view and details in the song.

The track, first recorded in September 1974, was re-recorded on December 30 at Sound 80 in Minneapolis. The new version was released on Blood on the Tracks on January 20, 1975. (Note: Some sources state the release date as 17 January 1975) The song received widespread acclaim from music critics, with particular praise for the lyrics. Rolling Stone ranked it No. 68 on their list of the 500 Greatest Songs of All Time. A number of alternate versions have been released, including multiple studio out-takes on The Bootleg Series Vol. 14: More Blood, More Tracks (2014). Dylan has performed the song live more than 1,600 times.

== Background and recording ==
The song was written in the summer of 1974, after Dylan's comeback tour with The Band that year and his separation from Sara Dylan, whom he had married in 1965. Dylan had moved to a farm in Minnesota with his brother, David Zimmerman, and there started to write the songs that were recorded for his album Blood on the Tracks. In the spring of 1974, Dylan had taken art classes at Carnegie Hall and was influenced by his tutor Norman Raeben, and in particular Raeben's view of time, when writing the lyrics. In a 1978 interview Dylan explained this style of songwriting: "What's different about it is that there's a code in the lyrics, and there's also no sense of time. There's no respect for it. You've got yesterday, today, and tomorrow all in the same room, and there's very little you can't imagine not happening". Richard F. Thomas, Professor of the Classics at Harvard University, has written that Dylan has been "characteristically vague" on the use of any specific painting techniques emulated while he was writing the words for the songs on Blood On The Tracks. Novelist Ron Rosenbaum said Dylan told him that he'd written "Tangled Up in Blue" after spending a weekend listening to Joni Mitchell's 1971 album Blue.

Dylan first recorded "Tangled Up in Blue" in New York City on 16 September 1974 during the initial Blood on the Tracks sessions at A&R Studios. Eight takes were recorded in New York from 16 to 19 September, mostly featuring Tony Brown on bass alongside Dylan on guitar and harmonica, and containing some minor variations in lyrics, as well as differences in vocal delivery, and tempo. Two of the versions later released on The Bootleg Series Vol. 14: More Blood, More Tracks (Deluxe edition) also include Paul Griffin on organ. That December, working from a suggestion from his brother that the album should have a more commercial sound, Dylan re-recorded half the songs on Blood on the Tracks, including "Tangled Up in Blue" on 30 December at Sound 80 in Minneapolis, Minnesota.

David Zimmerman was the producer for the Minneapolis Blood on the Tracks recordings, but was not credited on the album. The re-recorded versions were radical departures from the original recordings, and each new recording included changes to the lyrics from the earlier versions. This recording featured a full band: Kevin Odegard (guitar), Chris Weber (guitar) Gregg Inhofer (keyboards), Billy Peterson (bass), and Bill Berg (drums), with Dylan singing, and on guitar and harmonica. These musicians were based locally and had arrived at Zimmerman's invitation, and Dylan had not met them before they started working together on 27 December.

The Minneapolis version was included as the opening track on Blood on the Tracks, released on 20 January 1975, and in February as a single backed with "If You See Her, Say Hello". The single reached number 31 on the Hot 100 chart. Outtakes of "Tangled Up in Blue" from the New York sessions were released in 1991 on The Bootleg Series Volumes 1–3 (Rare & Unreleased) 1961–1991 and in 2018 on the single-CD and 2-LP versions of The Bootleg Series Vol. 14: More Blood, More Tracks, while the complete New York sessions were released on the deluxe edition of the latter album. The deluxe version of The Bootleg Series Vol. 14 also included a remix of the December 1974 master issued on Blood on the Tracks.

== Composition and lyrical interpretation ==
"Tangled Up in Blue"
A 25-second sample of "Tangled Up in Blue". A writer from Billboard said that the "strong acoustic background" instrumentals were reminiscent of Dylan's early songs.

With "Tangled Up in Blue", Dylan used shifting perspectives of time, influenced by his recent studies under Raeben. Michael Gray describes the structure of "Tangled Up in Blue's" lyrics as the story of a love affair and career and how the "past upon present, public upon privacy, distance upon friendship, [and] disintegration upon love" transform and are complicated over time. Timothy Hampton, Professor of Comparative Literature and French at the University of California, Berkeley, has described the structure of the lyrics as a set of sonnets, with seven stanzas each of 14 lines, each with a volta after line eight.

Dylan continually re-worked the lyrics and arrangement even after the album was released. During his 1978 World Tour, the line starting "She opened up a book of poems" became "She opened up the Bible and started quotin' it to me", becoming one of the first public indicators of Dylan's conversion to Christianity. The version released on Real Live, as performed throughout his 1984 Europe tour, differs radically in structure and lyrics from earlier versions, with a more cynical view of romance. Dylan said in 1985 that he was more satisfied with the implementation of multiple viewpoints in the song than he had been with the original. Dylan has often stated that the song took "ten years to live and two years to write".

In a 1985 interview with Bill Flanagan, Dylan said that although many people thought that the album Blood on the Tracks was autobiographical, "It didn't pertain to me. It was just a concept of putting in images that defy time – yesterday, today and tomorrow. I wanted to make them all connect in some kind of a strange way." In his 2004 memoir Chronicles: Volume One, Dylan claimed that Blood on the Tracks was "an entire album based on Chekhov short stories. Critics thought it was autobiographical – that was fine."

== Critical reception ==
Billboard regarded "Tangled Up in Blue" as Dylan's most powerful and most commercial single in a long time, saying that Dylan's voice and the "strong acoustic background" instrumentals were reminiscent of Dylan's early songs. Cash Box said that it is a "great tune...with lyrics pouring forth in profusion and with Bob's voice in excellent shape." Jon Landau in Rolling Stone praised Dylan's lyrics and delivery of the song, but was unimpressed by the accompanying musicians and the production of the album, while Jonathan Cott, in the same issue of the magazine, called the track "brilliant and haunted." Cott likened the effect of the album's lyrics to those of the Italian 13th-century poem referred to in the song, quoting from the song:

And every one of them words rang true
And glowed like burnin’ coal
Pourin’ off of every page
Like it was written in my soul
From me to you
Tangled up in blue

Critics and Dylan himself have offered different theories about the referent in "...Italian poet/From the thirteenth century". Matthew Collins of Harvard, noting that Dylan may not have been precise with dates, argues that there are similarities between elements of the lyrics and the fifth canto of Dante's 14th-century Inferno, but argues that the reference is more likely to Petrarch. Collins and Hampton note that Dylan, asked in a 1978 interview which poet the song alludes to, replied, "Plutarch. Is that his name?"

Don Stanley in The Vancouver Sun said that the song "succeeds on the strength of its metaphors." An opposing view was expressed by Al Rudis, in The Pittsburgh Press, who was unimpressed by the song's lyrics, calling the track "a long lurching song [but with] no build-up of cumulative power" and stating that it contains "seemingly meaningless images." Neil McCormick remarked in 2003 that the song is "A truly extraordinary epic of the personal, an unreliable narrative carved out of shifting memories like a five-and-a-half-minute musical Proust." The Daily Telegraph has described the song as "The most dazzling lyric ever written, an abstract narrative of relationships told in an amorphous blend of first and third person, rolling past, present and future together, spilling out in tripping cadences and audacious internal rhymes, ripe with sharply turned images and observations and filled with a painfully desperate longing."

Jim Beviglia ranks "Tangled Up in Blue" 14th in his 2013 assessment of the 100 best Dylan songs, saying that "this masterful song doesn't skimp on the pain." In a 2020 article for The Guardian, Alexis Petridis ranked it the twelfth-greatest of Dylan's songs. The track was ranked 3rd on Rolling Stone's 2016 ranking of the 100 greatest Dylan songs, with the staff describing it as "where emotional truths meet the everlasting comfort of the American folk song." Rolling Stone ranked it No. 68 on their 2011 list of the 500 Greatest Songs of All Time, and re-ranked it at No. 67 in 2021. A 2021 Guardian article included it on a list of "80 Bob Dylan songs everyone should know".

== Live performances ==
Dylan has performed the song live 1,685 times up to August 2018. The first was on 13 November 1975 at Veterans Memorial Coliseum, New Haven. The most recent live performance as of October 2025 was on 28 August 2018 at Horncastle Arena, Christchurch, New Zealand.

Dylan played the song solo on acoustic guitar during the first leg of the Rolling Thunder Revue tour in 1975, a performance of which is featured in Dylan's 1978 film Renaldo and Clara and which later became the song's official music video. On the second leg of the Rolling Thunder Revue, in 1976, the song was performed with a full band in what Clinton Heylin has called a "gear-crunching heavy-metal" arrangement. The 1978 World Tour performances were slower, with a big band. After 1978, the next live performances were in 1984, again solo on acoustic guitar but this time with radically reworked lyrics. Versions performed after 1984 have been closer to the original.

== Credits and personnel ==
Credits for the Blood on the Tracks and single release, adapted from the Bob Dylan All the Songs: The Story Behind Every Track book.

Musicians

- Bob Dylan – lead vocals, acoustic rhythm guitar, harmonica
- Kevin Odegard – acoustic lead guitar
- Chris Weber – acoustic lead guitar
- Gregg Inhofer – keyboards
- Billy Peterson – bass guitar
- Bill Berg – drums

Technical

- David Zimmerman – producer (uncredited)
- Paul Martinson – engineering

== Covers and references ==
The song has been covered by various artists, including Barb Jungr, Jerry Garcia, Half Japanese, Robyn Hitchcock, the Indigo Girls, Kim Larsen, T-Bone Burnett, Great White, Joan Baez, Ani Difranco, KT Tunstall, The Whitlams, and The String Cheese Incident. Mary Lee's Corvette covered the entire Blood on The Tracks album in 2002, including "Tangled Up in Blue". According to Hootie & the Blowfish vocalist Darius Rucker, their song "Only Wanna Be with You" was written as a tribute to Dylan; it includes the lines "Put on a little Dylan sitting on a fence," "Ain't Bobby so cool?", and "I'm tangled up in blue."

The song is a playable track on Rock Band 2, as the most difficult song in the vocal section, and the final song for the player to complete in the "Impossible Vocal Challenge". "Tangled Up in Blue" is also published as one of two poems by Dylan in The Seagull Book of Poems. Dylan reworked the lyrics again for an artwork, consisting of handwritten lyrics and a sketch of an abandoned car, displayed at the Halcyon Gallery's Mondo Scripto exhibition in 2018.

== Charts (single) ==
Chart performance for "Tangled Up in Blue"
Chart (1975)	Peak position
US Billboard Hot 100	31

== Official album releases ==
	Album	Release year	Recorded at	Recording date	Take/ version	Personnel	Ref.
1	Blood on the Tracks	1975	Sound 80	30 December 1974		Bob Dylan: vocals, guitar, harmonica; Kevin Odegard: guitar; Chris Weber: guitar; Gregg Inhofer: keyboards; Billy Peterson: bass; Bill Berg: drums	
2	Real Live	1984	Wembley Stadium	7 July 1984		Bob Dylan: vocals, guitar, harmonica; Colin Allen: drums; Ian McLagan: keyboards; Gregg Sutton:bass guitar; Mick Taylor: guitar	
3	Biograph	1985			Blood on the Tracks version		
4	The Bootleg Series Volumes 1–3 (Rare & Unreleased) 1961–1991	1991	A&R Studios	16 September 1974	Take 3, Remake 2	Bob Dylan: vocals, guitar, harmonica; Tony Brown: bass. Unknown additional acoustic guitar, from one of Charles Brown, III, Eric Weissberg, or Barry Kornfeld. Later also released on The Bootleg Series Vol. 14: More Blood, More Tracks	
5	Bob Dylan's Greatest Hits Volume 3	1994			Blood on the Tracks version		
6	The Essential Bob Dylan	2000			Blood on the Tracks version		
7	The Bootleg Series Vol. 5: Bob Dylan Live 1975, The Rolling Thunder Revue	2002	Boston Music Hall	21 Nov 1975	Evening show	Later also released on Bob Dylan – The Rolling Thunder Revue: The 1975 Live Recordings (Deluxe edition) (For personnel, see that entry)	
8	The Best of Bob Dylan	2005			Blood on the Tracks version		
9	Dylan	2007			Blood on the Tracks version		
10	The Very Best of Bob Dylan	2013			Blood on the Tracks version		
11	The Bootleg Series Vol. 14: More Blood, More Tracks	2018	A&R Studios	19 September 1974	19/9/74, Take 3, Remake 3	Bob Dylan: vocals, guitar, harmonica; Tony Brown: bass	
12	The Bootleg Series Vol. 14: More Blood, More Tracks (Deluxe edition)	2018	A&R Studios	16 September 1974	Take 1	Bob Dylan: vocals, guitar, harmonica; Tony Brown: bass	
13	The Bootleg Series Vol. 14: More Blood, More Tracks (Deluxe edition)	2018	A&R Studios	17 September 1974	Rehearsal	Bob Dylan: vocals, guitar, harmonica; Tony Brown: bass; Paul Griffin: organ	
14	The Bootleg Series Vol. 14: More Blood, More Tracks (Deluxe edition)	2018	A&R Studios	17 September 1974	Take 2, Remake	Bob Dylan: vocals, guitar, harmonica; Tony Brown: bass; Paul Griffin: organ	
15	The Bootleg Series Vol. 14: More Blood, More Tracks (Deluxe edition)	2018	A&R Studios	17 September 1974	Take 3, Remake	Bob Dylan: vocals, guitar, harmonica; Tony Brown: bass	
16	The Bootleg Series Vol. 14: More Blood, More Tracks (Deluxe edition)	2018	A&R Studios	19 September 1974	Rehearsal and Take 1, Remake 2	Bob Dylan: vocals, guitar, harmonica; Tony Brown: bass	
17	The Bootleg Series Vol. 14: More Blood, More Tracks (Deluxe edition)	2018	A&R Studios	19 September 1974	Take 2, Remake 2	Bob Dylan: vocals, guitar, harmonica; Tony Brown: bass	
18	The Bootleg Series Vol. 14: More Blood, More Tracks (Deluxe edition)	2018	A&R Studios	19 September 1974	Take 3, Remake 2	Included on a test pressing and also on The Bootleg Series Volumes 1–3 (Rare & Unreleased) 1961–1991)	
19	The Bootleg Series Vol. 14: More Blood, More Tracks (Deluxe edition)	2018	A&R Studios	19 September 1974	Rehearsal and Takes 1–2, Remake 3	Bob Dylan: vocals, guitar, harmonica; Tony Brown: bass	
20	The Bootleg Series Vol. 14: More Blood, More Tracks (Deluxe edition)	2018	A&R Studios	19 September 1974	Take 3, Remake 3	Bob Dylan: vocals, guitar, harmonica; Tony Brown: bass	
21	The Bootleg Series Vol. 14: More Blood, More Tracks (Deluxe edition)	2018			Blood on the Tracks version		
22	Bob Dylan – The Rolling Thunder Revue: The 1975 Live Recordings (Deluxe edition)	2019	Worcester Memorial Auditorium	19 November 1975		Bob Dylan – vocals, guitar, piano, harmonica; Bobby Neuwirth: guitar, vocals; Scarlet Rivera: violin; T Bone J. Henry Burnett: guitar, vocals; Steven Soles: guitar, vocals; Mick Ronson: guitar; David Mansfield: steel guitar, mandolin, violin, dobro; Rob Stoner: bass guitar, vocals; Howie Wyeth: drums, piano; Luther Rix: drums, percussion, congas; Ronee Blakley: vocals; Ramblin' Jack Elliott: vocals, guitar; Allen Ginsberg: vocals, finger cymbals; Joni Mitchell: vocals	
23	Bob Dylan – The Rolling Thunder Revue: The 1975 Live Recordings (Deluxe edition)	2019	Boston Music Hall	21 November 1975	Evening show	Bob Dylan – vocals, guitar, piano, harmonica; Bobby Neuwirth: guitar, vocals; Scarlet Rivera: violin; T Bone J. Henry Burnett: guitar, vocals; Steven Soles: guitar, vocals; Mick Ronson: guitar; David Mansfield: steel guitar, mandolin, violin, dobro; Rob Stoner: bass guitar, vocals; Howie Wyeth: drums, piano; Luther Rix: drums, percussion, congas; Ronee Blakley: vocals; Ramblin' Jack Elliott: vocals, guitar; Allen Ginsberg: vocals, finger cymbals; Joni Mitchell: vocals	
24	Bob Dylan – The Rolling Thunder Revue: The 1975 Live Recordings (Deluxe edition)	2019	Forum de Montréal	4 December 1975		Bob Dylan – vocals, guitar, piano, harmonica; Bobby Neuwirth: guitar, vocals; Scarlet Rivera: violin; T Bone J. Henry Burnett: guitar, vocals; Steven Soles: guitar, vocals; Mick Ronson: guitar; David Mansfield: steel guitar, mandolin, violin, dobro; Rob Stoner: bass guitar, vocals; Howie Wyeth: drums, piano; Luther Rix: drums, percussion, congas; Ronee Blakley: vocals; Ramblin' Jack Elliott: vocals, guitar; Allen Ginsberg: vocals, finger cymbals; Joni Mitchell: vocals	
