= Simple Twist of Fate =

1975 song by Bob Dylan

Song by Bob Dylan

from the album Blood on the Tracks
- Released: January 1975
- Recorded: September 19, 1974
- Studio: A&R Recording Studios, New York City
- Length: 4:18
- Label: Columbia
- Songwriter(s): Bob Dylan
- Producer(s): Bob Dylan

Blood on the Tracks track listing
- 10 tracks Side one: 1. "Tangled Up in Blue"; 2. "Simple Twist of Fate"; 3. "You're a Big Girl Now"; 4. "Idiot Wind"; 5. "You're Gonna Make Me Lonesome When You Go"; Side two: 6. "Meet Me in the Morning"; 7. "Lily, Rosemary and the Jack of Hearts"; 8. "If You See Her, Say Hello"; 9. "Shelter from the Storm"; 10. "Buckets of Rain"

"Simple Twist of Fate", a song by American singer-songwriter Bob Dylan, was recorded on September 19, 1974, and was released in 1975 as the second song on his 15th studio album Blood on the Tracks.

== Background and recording ==
"Simple Twist of Fate" is a narrative song about a romantic relationship destined not to work out. It is unusual in that it begins in the third person before shifting into the first. The song has been interpreted variously as being inspired by Suze Rotolo, Joan Baez and Sara Dylan. Dylan has continually revised the lyrics in live performance over the decades (through to its most recent outings in 2024 on the Never Ending Tour).

The song was written in the key of E major and features a descending melody line, with a chord structure almost identical to the verses of "Can't Take My Eyes Off You", Frankie Valli's 1967 hit by Bob Crewe and Bob Gaudio. Dylan scholar Jochen Markhorst has described as "brilliant" the purposeful way Dylan fused the music to the lyrics: "It gives a magical sparkle to the rhyme scheme that on paper almost looks like an everyday rhyme (a a a b b c c). The sparse use of the minor chord is masterful too. Everyone else would, given the melancholic lyrics, play the entire song in minor. Song Maestro Dylan senses that he adds to the fascination when he plays in the major, briefly slipping to minor in every fourth line – when the main character feels alone, when he gets hit by the heat of the night, when he feels empty inside, when he is despairing if she would ever pick him again".

The album version of the song was recorded at Studio A, A&R Recording Studios, in New York. Dylan sang and played guitar and harmonica, with Tony Brown on bass. Five takes were attempted on September 16, and three takes on 19 September; the last of these appears on Blood on the Tracks.

== Critical reception and legacy ==
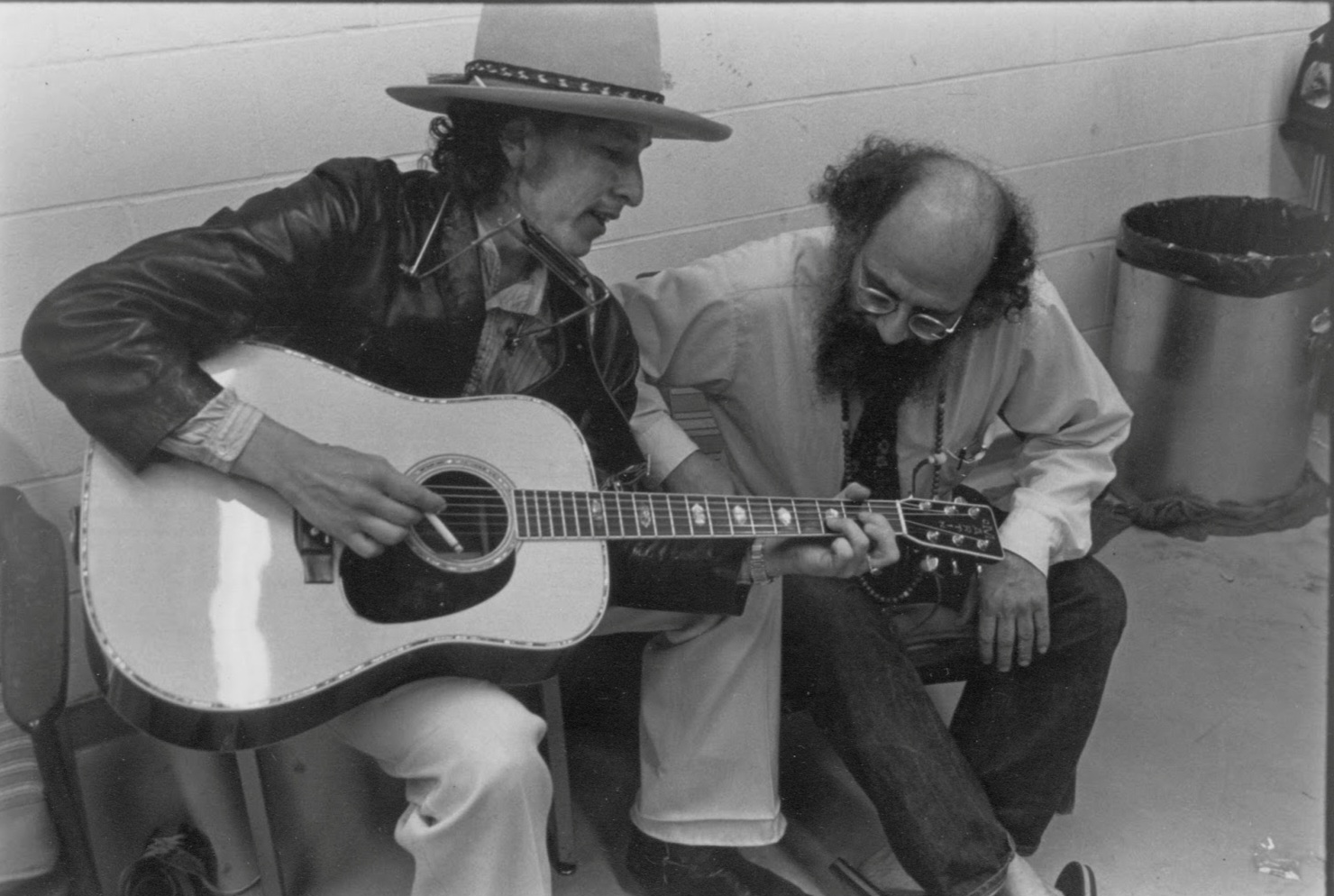
Dylan (left) with the poet Allen Ginsberg on November 2, 1975, a few days before Dylan debuted Simple Twist of Fate in concert.

Rolling Stone magazine ranked the song 15th on a list of the "100 Greatest Bob Dylan Songs". An article accompanying the list calls it a look "at an idyllic relationship that fell apart for reasons neither party can control" from the point-of-view of a narrator who "has moved on to meaningless one-night stands".

Spectrum Culture included the song on a list of "Bob Dylan's 20 Greatest Songs of the 1970s". In an article accompanying the list, critic notes that it "could easily be a short story" and praises the poetic detail of the lyrics: "The world feels real, immersive, and it is filled with rich details—the 'neon burning bright', the saxophone and the 'ticking of the clocks'. Yet it may be the more abstract lines that hold the most weight. When the character wakes up alone, he feels 'an emptiness inside' to which he cannot relate. It’s one thing to feel empty; it’s another to be estranged from your own emptiness".

A 2021 article in the Irish Independent named it one of the "all-time top 10 tracks by Bob Dylan", summarizing it as "a man's life in a song". A 2021 Guardian article included it on a list of "80 Bob Dylan songs everyone should know".

Stereogum ran an article to coincide with Dylan's 80th birthday on May 24, 2021, in which 80 musicians were asked to name their favorite Dylan songs. Róisín Murphy selected "Simple Twist of Fate", noting "When he says, 'I was born too late' at the end — you’re thinking about the open windows earlier and wondering if he’s going to throw himself out the window. You don’t know if he’s killed himself or anything at the end. It’s a lovely, bouncy pop song with great equilibrium. You can sing it a cappella, and it bounces around as well — you’d have the whole room jumping. That’s the mark of something rare. His voice is so true to him in that time, but it’s also universal. It’s a great all-rounder for me, his greatest one. It’s absolute perfection".

Radiohead's Thom Yorke cited it as one of two songs that always make him cry (the other being Tom Waits's "Tom Traubert's Blues") in a Rolling Stone interview in 2023.

== Personnel ==
Musicians

- Bob Dylan – vocals, acoustic guitar, harmonica
- Tony Brown – bass guitar

Technical

- Sound engineering: Phil Ramone and Glenn Berger

== Other versions ==
The complete recording sessions of "Simple Twist of Fate", consisting of eight takes of the song, were released on the deluxe edition of The Bootleg Series Vol. 14: More Blood, More Tracks in 2018. The first take of the song was recorded on September 16, 1974, and was also included on the single-CD and 2-LP versions of the album.

== Live performances ==
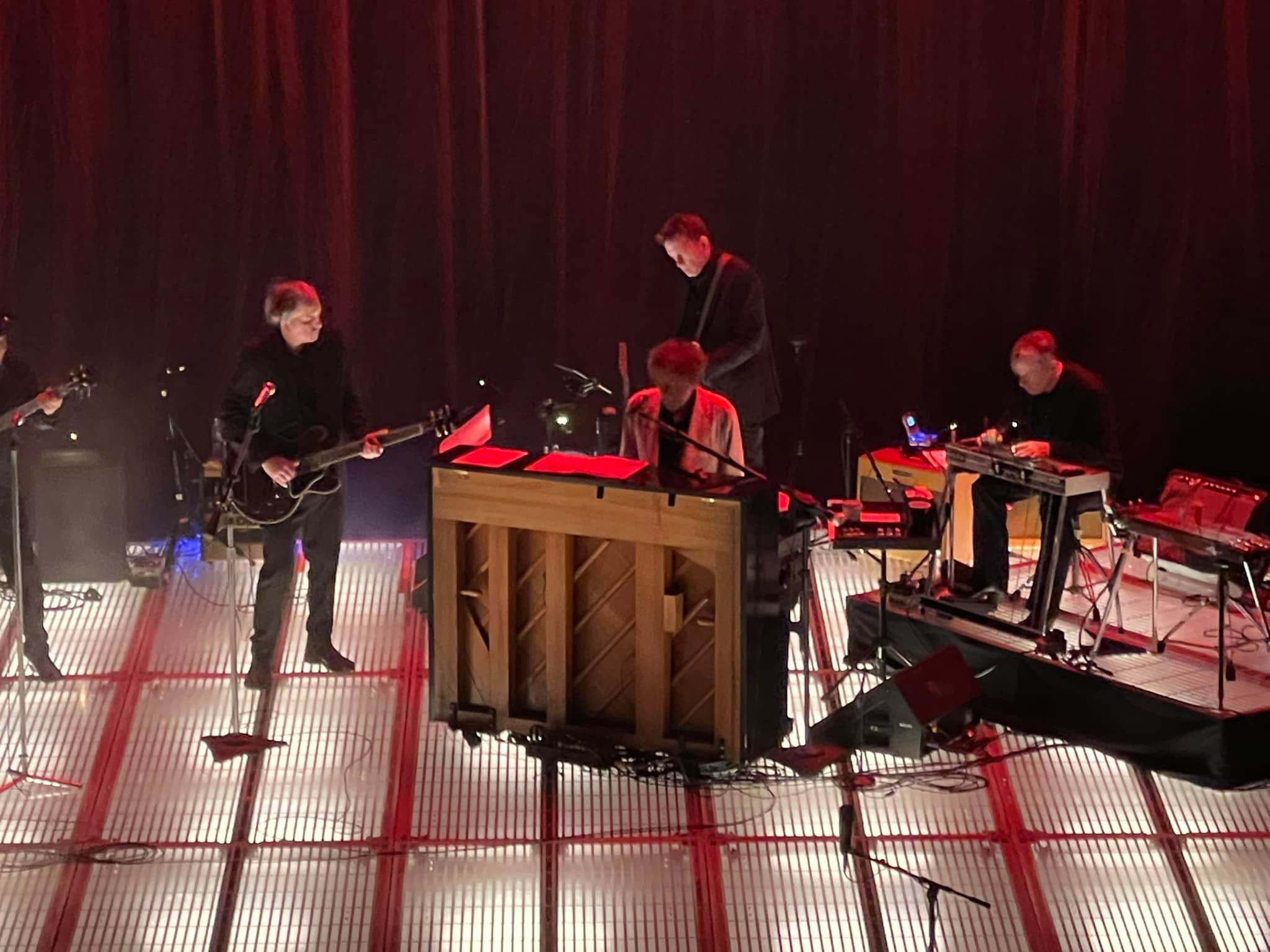
Bob Dylan's performed the song on November 2, 2021, in Milwaukee. Dylan is at the centre of the picture, playing the upright piano, in this picture from the show.

Dylan first performed the song live in Burlington, Vermont, on November 8, 1975. Dylan's November 20, 1975 live performance of the song from the Rolling Thunder Revue tour was released on The Bootleg Series Vol. 5: Bob Dylan Live 1975, The Rolling Thunder Revue (2002) and on the box set The Rolling Thunder Revue: The 1975 Live Recordings (2019). An unorthodox rendition at a mahjong parlor on October 28, 1975, was also included in the box set, as well as in the film Rolling Thunder Revue: A Bob Dylan Story by Martin Scorsese (2019). A live performance recorded on February 28, 1978, appeared on Bob Dylan at Budokan (1979). In all, Dylan has performed the song over 800 times in concert between 1975 and 2024.

== Notable covers ==
"Simple Twist of Fate" has been covered and reinterpreted by several artists: first covered by Joan Baez on Diamonds & Rust (1975); by the Jerry Garcia Band on their 2-disc live album Jerry Garcia Band (1991) and on Run for the Roses (1982) (bonus track on 2004 rerelease); by Concrete Blonde on their Still in Hollywood (1994) collection; by Sean Costello on his self-titled album (2005); by The Format on Listen to Bob Dylan: A Tribute (2005); by Bryan Ferry on Dylanesque (2007); by Jeff Tweedy (with altered lyrics taken from a live Dylan performance) on the soundtrack for the film I'm Not There (2007); by Stephen Fretwell on Man On the Roof (2007) as a bonus track; by Sarah Jarosz on Build Me Up From Bones (2013); by Diana Krall on the 2012 charity tribute to Dylan Chimes of Freedom: Songs of Bob Dylan Honoring 50 Years of Amnesty International; and by Emma Swift on her 2020 album Blonde on the Tracks.
