= The Bootleg Series Vol. 14: More Blood, More Tracks =

2018 compilation album by Bob Dylan

Compilation album by Bob Dylan
- Released: November 2, 2018
- Recorded: September and December 1974
- Genre: Folk rock
- Length: 62:01 (standard); 360:12 (deluxe)
- Label: Columbia

Bob Dylan chronology
The Bootleg Series Vol. 13: Trouble No More 1979–1981 (2017)	The Bootleg Series Vol. 14: More Blood, More Tracks (2018)	Bob Dylan – The Rolling Thunder Revue: The 1975 Live Recordings (2019)

Bob Dylan Bootleg Series chronology
Vol. 13: Trouble No More 1979–1981 (2017)	Vol. 14: More Blood, More Tracks (2018)	Vol. 15: Travelin' Thru, 1967–1969 (2019)

The Bootleg Series Vol. 14: More Blood, More Tracks is a compilation album by American singer-songwriter Bob Dylan. The 12th installment in the ongoing Bob Dylan Bootleg Series, it was released by Legacy Records on November 2, 2018. The compilation focuses on recordings Dylan made in September and December 1974 for his 1975 album Blood on the Tracks. The release comes in both a one-disc standard edition and a six-disc deluxe edition. It is the first volume since the third where the standard edition is not a double disc.

Prior to the appearance of this set, seven outtakes from the sessions for Blood on the Tracks had been officially released by Columbia: two appeared on Biograph; three appeared on Volume 2 of the Bootleg Series; one on Volume 3; and one as the B-side to the "Duquesne Whistle" single. An eighth appeared in altered form on the soundtrack album to the film Jerry Maguire, released on Sony Legacy, the parent company of Columbia. On September 20, 2018, in conjunction with the announcement of the compilation, Dylan released an alternate take of the song "If You See Her, Say Hello". The day before the limited edition six-disc set shipped, a note appeared on Bob Dylan's official website reporting that a printing error had occurred that resulted in four pages being omitted from the booklet accompanying the set. The website apologized for the omission and provided a PDF download of the missing pages.

== Track listing ==
=== 2-LP edition ===
All tracks are written by Bob Dylan.

Side one
No.	Title	Version	Length
1.	"Tangled Up in Blue"	9/19/74: Take 3, Remake 3	6:32
2.	"Simple Twist of Fate"	9/16/74: Take 1	4:41
3.	"Shelter from the Storm"	9/17/74: Take 2	4:39
Total length:			15:52

Side two
No.	Title	Version	Length
1.	"You're a Big Girl Now"	9/16/74: Take 2	4:41
2.	"Buckets of Rain"	9/18/74: Take 2, Remake	3:03
3.	"If You See Her, Say Hello"	9/16/74: Take 1	3:58
Total length:			11:42

Side three
No.	Title	Version	Length
1.	"Lily, Rosemary and the Jack of Hearts" (included on original test pressing)	9/16/74: Take 2	9:49
2.	"Meet Me in the Morning" (previously released on “Duquesne Whistle” 7” single)	9/19/74: Take 1, Remake	4:57
Total length:			14:46

Side four
No.	Title	Version	Length
1.	"Idiot Wind"	9/19/74: Take 4, Remake	8:53
2.	"You're Gonna Make Me Lonesome When You Go"	9/17/74: Take 1, Remake	3:11
3.	"Up to Me"	9/19/74: Take 2, Remake	6:48
Total length:			18:52

=== Deluxe Edition ===
Disc one
No.	Title	Version	Length
1.	"If You See Her, Say Hello" (included on single disc standard edition)	9/16/74: Take 1	3:58
2.	"If You See Her, Say Hello" (previously released on The Bootleg Series Volume 3)	9/16/74: Take 2	3:44
3.	"You're a Big Girl Now"	9/16/74: Take 1	5:38
4.	"You're a Big Girl Now" (included on single disc standard edition)	9/16/74: Take 2	4:41
5.	"Simple Twist of Fate" (included on single disc standard edition)	9/16/74: Take 1	4:41
6.	"Simple Twist of Fate"	9/16/74: Take 2	5:05
7.	"You're a Big Girl Now"	9/16/74: Take 3	4:14
8.	"Up to Me"	9/16/74: Rehearsal	0:20
9.	"Up to Me"	9/16/74: Take 1	6:04
10.	"Lily, Rosemary and the Jack of Hearts"	9/16/74: Take 1	3:15
11.	"Lily, Rosemary and the Jack of Hearts" (included on original test pressing, and single disc standard edition)	9/16/74: Take 2	9:49
Total length:			51:29

Disc two
No.	Title	Version	Length
1.	"Simple Twist of Fate"	9/16/74: Take 1A	4:58
2.	"Simple Twist of Fate"	9/16/74: Take 2A	1:24
3.	"Simple Twist of Fate"	9/16/74: Take 3A	4:22
4.	"Call Letter Blues"	9/16/74: Take 1	4:42
5.	"Meet Me in the Morning" (edited version included on original test pressing, and previously released on Blood on the Tracks)	9/16/74: Take 1	5:43
6.	"Call Letter Blues" (previously released on The Bootleg Series Volume 2)	9/16/74: Take 2	4:29
7.	"Idiot Wind"	9/16/74: Take 1	3:48
8.	"Idiot Wind"	9/16/74: Take 1, Remake	5:29
9.	"Idiot Wind"	9/16/74: Take 3 with Insert	7:11
10.	"Idiot Wind"	9/16/74: Take 5	0:30
11.	"Idiot Wind" (previously released on The Bootleg Series Volume 2)	9/16/74: Take 6	8:52
12.	"You're Gonna Make Me Lonesome When You Go"	9/16/74: Rehearsal and Take 1	1:25
13.	"You're Gonna Make Me Lonesome When You Go"	9/16/74: Take 2	0:46
14.	"You're Gonna Make Me Lonesome When You Go"	9/16/74: Take 3	1:13
15.	"You're Gonna Make Me Lonesome When You Go"	9/16/74: Take 4	3:12
16.	"You're Gonna Make Me Lonesome When You Go"	9/16/74: Take 5	5:16
17.	"You're Gonna Make Me Lonesome When You Go"	9/16/74: Take 6	1:03
18.	"You're Gonna Make Me Lonesome When You Go"	9/16/74: Take 6, Remake	0:57
19.	"You're Gonna Make Me Lonesome When You Go"	9/16/74: Take 7	0:59
20.	"You're Gonna Make Me Lonesome When You Go"	9/16/74: Take 8	3:33
Total length:			69:52

Disc three
No.	Title	Version	Length
1.	"Tangled Up in Blue"	9/16/74: Take 1	7:19
2.	"You're a Big Girl Now"	9/17/74: Take 1, Remake	4:55
3.	"You're a Big Girl Now" (included on original test pressing, previously released on Biograph)	9/17/74: Take 2, Remake	4:23
4.	"Tangled Up in Blue"	9/17/74: Rehearsal	0:59
5.	"Tangled Up in Blue"	9/17/74: Take 2, Remake	6:38
6.	"Spanish Is the Loving Tongue"	9/17/74: Take 1	4:56
7.	"Call Letter Blues"	9/17/74: Rehearsal	2:03
8.	"You're Gonna Make Me Lonesome When You Go" (included on single disc standard edition)	9/17/74: Take 1, Remake	3:11
9.	"Shelter from the Storm" (previously released without piano on the Jerry Maguire original soundtrack)	9/17/74: Take 1	6:03
10.	"Buckets of Rain"	9/17/74: Take 1	2:57
11.	"Tangled Up in Blue" (previously released on The Bootleg Series Volume 2)	9/17/74: Take 3, Remake	6:44
12.	"Buckets of Rain"	9/17/74: Take 2	3:20
13.	"Shelter from the Storm" (included on single disc standard edition)	9/17/74: Take 2	4:39
14.	"Shelter from the Storm"	9/17/74: Take 3	2:23
15.	"Shelter from the Storm" (previously released on Blood on the Tracks)	9/17/74: Take 4	5:02
Total length:			65:32

Disc four
No.	Title	Version	Length
1.	"You're Gonna Make Me Lonesome When You Go"	9/17/74: Take 1, Remake 2	3:43
2.	"You're Gonna Make Me Lonesome When You Go" (previously released on Blood on the Tracks)	9/17/74: Take 2, Remake 2	3:25
3.	"Buckets of Rain"	9/18/74: Take 1, Remake	3:19
4.	"Buckets of Rain" (included on single disc standard edition)	9/18/74: Take 2, Remake	3:03
5.	"Buckets of Rain"	9/18/74: Take 3, Remake	0:53
6.	"Buckets of Rain"	9/18/74: Take 4, Remake	2:37
7.	"Up to Me"	9/19/74: Take 1, Remake	1:17
8.	"Up to Me" (included on single disc standard edition)	9/19/74: Take 2, Remake	6:48
9.	"Buckets of Rain"	9/19/74: Take 1, Remake 2	3:08
10.	"Buckets of Rain"	9/19/74: Take 2, Remake 2	1:03
11.	"Buckets of Rain"	9/19/74: Take 3, Remake 2	1:55
12.	"Buckets of Rain" (previously released on Blood on the Tracks)	9/19/74: Take 4, Remake 2	3:23
13.	"If You See Her, Say Hello" (included on original test pressing)	9/19/74: Take 1, Remake	3:26
14.	"Up to Me"	9/19/74: Take 1, Remake 2	0:57
15.	"Up to Me"	9/19/74: Take 2, Remake 2	6:48
16.	"Up to Me"	9/19/74: Take 3, Remake 2	6:38
17.	"Buckets of Rain"	9/19/74: Rehearsal	0:53
18.	"Meet Me in the Morning" (previously released on "Duquesne Whistle" 7" single, and included on single disc standard edition)	9/19/74: Take 1, Remake	4:57
19.	"Meet Me in the Morning"	9/19/74: Take 2, Remake	4:15
20.	"Buckets of Rain"	9/19/74: Take 5, Remake 2	3:27
Total length:			65:55

Disc five
No.	Title	Version	Length
1.	"Tangled Up in Blue"	9/19/74: Rehearsal and Take 1, Remake 2	3:08
2.	"Tangled Up in Blue"	9/19/74: Take 2, Remake 2	1:32
3.	"Tangled Up in Blue" (included on original test pressing)	9/19/74: Take 3, Remake 2	6:51
4.	"Simple Twist of Fate"	9/19/74: Take 2, Remake	4:51
5.	"Simple Twist of Fate" (previously released on Blood on the Tracks)	9/19/74: Take 3, Remake	4:22
6.	"Up to Me"	9/19/74: Rehearsal and Take 1, Remake 3	2:25
7.	"Up to Me" (previously released on Biograph)	9/19/74: Take 2, Remake 3	6:24
8.	"Idiot Wind"	9/19/74: Rehearsal and Takes 1–3, Remake	4:53
9.	"Idiot Wind" (included on single disc standard edition)	9/19/74: Take 4, Remake	9:14
10.	"Idiot Wind" (included on original test pressing)	9/19/74: Take 4, Remake (with organ overdub)	8:52
11.	"You're a Big Girl Now"	9/19/74: Take 1, Remake 2	3:06
12.	"Meet Me in the Morning"	9/19/74: Take 1, Remake 2	3:52
13.	"Meet Me in the Morning"	9/19/74: Takes 2–3, Remake 2	1:43
Total length:			61:13

Disc six
No.	Title	Version	Length
1.	"You're a Big Girl Now"	9/19/74: Takes 3–6, Remake 2	2:17
2.	"Tangled Up in Blue"	9/19/74: Rehearsal and Takes 1–2, Remake 3	5:09
3.	"Tangled Up in Blue" (included on single disc standard edition)	9/19/74: Take 3, Remake 3	6:32
4.	"Idiot Wind" (previously released on Blood on the Tracks)	12/27/74: Minneapolis remake	7:53
5.	"You're a Big Girl Now" (previously released on Blood on the Tracks)	12/27/74: Minneapolis remake	4:38
6.	"Tangled Up in Blue" (previously released on Blood on the Tracks)	12/30/74: Minneapolis remake	5:47
7.	"Lily, Rosemary and the Jack of Hearts" (previously released on Blood on the Tracks)	12/30/74: Minneapolis remake	8:59
8.	"If You See Her, Say Hello" (previously released on Blood on the Tracks)	12/30/74: Minneapolis remake	4:44
Total length:			45:59

=== Sampler version ===
A sampler version of the album was also released in 2018. It contains a slightly different track listing than the single-CD version, culling songs from the expanded six-CD version. It is also the only version currently used by streaming services.

No.	Title	Version	Length
1.	"Tangled Up in Blue"	9/19/74: Take 3, Remake 3	6:31
2.	"If You See Her, Say Hello"	9/16/74: Take 1	3:57
3.	"Up to Me"	9/16/74: Take 1	6:04
4.	"You're Gonna Make Me Lonesome When You Go"	9/16/74: Take 5	5:16
5.	"Lily, Rosemary and the Jack of Hearts"	9/16/74: Take 2	9:50
6.	"You're a Big Girl Now"	9/16/74: Take 2	4:41
7.	"Shelter from the Storm"	9/17/74: Take 1	6:01
8.	"Call Letter Blues"	9/16/74: Take 1	4:42
9.	"Simple Twist of Fate"	9/16/74: Take 3A	4:22
10.	"Idiot Wind"	9/16/74: Take 6	8:49
Total length:			60:13

== Charts ==
Chart (2018)	Peak position
Australian Albums (ARIA)	25
Austrian Albums (Ö3 Austria)	9
Belgian Albums (Ultratop Flanders)	6
Belgian Albums (Ultratop Wallonia)	61
Canadian Albums (Billboard)	58
Danish Albums (Hitlisten)	37
Dutch Albums (Album Top 100)	7
German Albums (Offizielle Top 100)	4
Irish Albums (IRMA)	8
Italian Albums (FIMI)	19
Norwegian Albums (VG-lista)	4
Portuguese Albums (AFP)	41
Scottish Albums (Official Charts)	5
Spanish Albums (PROMUSICAE)	8
Swedish Albums (Sverigetopplistan)	2
Swiss Albums (Schweizer Hitparade)	13
UK Albums (Official Charts)	9
US Billboard 200	25
