= The Bootleg Series Volumes 1–3 (Rare & Unreleased) 1961–1991 =

Box set by Bob Dylan
- Released: March 26, 1991
- Recorded: November 1961 – March 1989 (Note: "Series of Dreams" remixed January 1991)
- Genres: Folk rock; folk blues
- Length: 229:37
- Label: Columbia
- Producer: Jeff Rosen
- Compiler: Jeff Rosen

Bob Dylan chronology
Under the Red Sky (1990)	The Bootleg Series Volumes 1–3 (Rare & Unreleased) 1961–1991 (1991)	Good as I Been to You (1992)

Bob Dylan Bootleg Series chronology
Volumes 1–3 (Rare & Unreleased) 1961–1991 (1991)	Vol. 4: The "Royal Albert Hall" Concert (1998)

Singles from The Bootleg Series Volumes 1–3 (Rare & Unreleased) 1961–1991
- 1. "Series of Dreams" Released: April 1991

Professional ratings
Review scores
Source	Rating
Allmusic	4.5/5 stars
Robert Christgau	(2-star Honorable Mention)
The Encyclopedia of Popular Music	5/5 stars
Rolling Stone	4/5 stars
Stereophile	Favorable

The Bootleg Series Volumes 1–3 is a box set by Bob Dylan issued on Columbia Records. It is the first installment in Dylan's Bootleg Series, comprising material spanning the first three decades of his career, from 1961 to 1989. It has been certified with a gold record by the RIAA as of August 1997, and peaked at No. 49 on the Billboard 200 and No. 32 in the UK.

== Background ==
Dylan has been subject to bootleg recordings throughout his career; the first bootleg of the rock era, Great White Wonder, consisted of pirate recordings drawn from various sources. His 1985 box set Biograph, rather than just being another (very large) compilation, presented 18 never officially released tracks of 53 total, acknowledging this long-standing appetite for pirated Dylan recordings. With the approach of Dylan's 30-year mark in the record industry, Columbia Records initiated the proper release of material that had circulated regularly on Dylan bootlegs, starting with this box set in 1991 to satisfy demand for Dylan's unissued material.

== Content ==
The Bootleg Series Volumes 1–3 contains rarities and unreleased works from the sessions for 1962's debut Bob Dylan to 1989's Oh Mercy; at the time of its issue a survey of his entire recording career. Of the 58 total tracks, 45 are session outtakes from recording sessions for Dylan studio albums. Of the remaining 13 tracks, one is an outtake from the session for the "George Jackson" single of 1971, two are further releases from the Basement Tape sessions of 1967, five are live recordings, and five are demo records, three of latter being later duplicated on Volume 9 of the series. With the appearance of further volumes, other recordings from this set have also been duplicated, such as those on Volume 11 or Volume 12.

The material is spread across three compact discs, five vinyl records, or three cassette tapes. In the case of the compact disc and cassette versions, each individual disc or cassette is labeled in the set as a distinct volume. Subsequent albums in the Bootleg Series were standardized to a double-disc volume in their primary non-limited edition format, excepting for Volumes 14 and 15, and all continue the compact disc volume numbering. Unlike ensuing installments in the series, none of Volumes 1–3 are available individually in physical form. Also unlike subsequent volumes in the series, only this one constitutes a complete overview of Dylan's career, at least as measured by the date of its release.

A remastered version in smaller packaging was issued on August 19, 1997, on Legacy Recordings, the reissue imprint of Sony Records.

== Reception ==
In his 2006 Bob Dylan Encyclopedia, author Michael Gray states that "most artists couldn't muster a single outtake to hold alongside any of this; Dylan can provide 58 recordings almost every one of which is of numinous excellence." The success of this set generated an entire series of official Dylan bootlegs issued under the Legacy Records imprint of Sony Music, with an additional 15 instalments as of 2025.

Other artists have also followed suit in presenting archived concerts and studio material, specifically the following: The Beatles with their anthology sets from the mid-1990s; The Grateful Dead with their multiple continued vault release series; Neil Young and his archives series; The Rolling Stones with their official bootlegs; and Miles Davis with his bootleg series also on Legacy Records.

== Track listing ==
All tracks are written by Bob Dylan, except where noted; all arrangements by Bob Dylan.

Disc one — Volume One
No.	Title	Source	Length
1.	"Hard Times in New York Town" (December 22, 1961)	home tape recorded by Tony Glover	2:19
2.	"He Was a Friend of Mine" (traditional) (November 20, 1961)	Bob Dylan outtake	4:02
3.	"Man on the Street" (November 22, 1961)	Bob Dylan outtake	1:56
4.	"No More Auction Block" (traditional) (October 1962)	live at the Gaslight cafe, Greenwich Village	3:03
5.	"House Carpenter" (traditional) (March 19, 1962)	The Freewheelin' Bob Dylan outtake	4:08
6.	"Talkin' Bear Mountain Picnic Massacre Blues" (April 25, 1962)	The Freewheelin' Bob Dylan outtake	3:45
7.	"Let Me Die in My Footsteps" (April 25, 1962)	The Freewheelin' Bob Dylan outtake	3:33
8.	"Rambling, Gambling Willie" (April 24, 1962)	The Freewheelin' Bob Dylan outtake	4:13
9.	"Talkin' Hava Negeilah Blues" (traditional) April 25, 1962)	The Freewheelin' Bob Dylan outtake	0:52
10.	"Quit Your Low Down Ways" (July 9, 1962)	The Freewheelin' Bob Dylan outtake	2:39
11.	"Worried Blues" (traditional) (July 9, 1962)	The Freewheelin' Bob Dylan outtake	2:39
12.	"Kingsport Town" (traditional) (November 14, 1962)	The Freewheelin' Bob Dylan outtake	3:29
13.	"Walkin' Down the Line" (1963)	demo for the Witmark Music Publishing Company	2:52
14.	"Walls of Red Wing" (April 24, 1963)	The Freewheelin' Bob Dylan outtake	5:05
15.	"Paths of Victory" (August 12, 1963)	The Times They Are A-Changin' outtake	3:17
16.	"Talkin' John Birch Paranoid Blues" (October 26, 1963)	live at Carnegie Hall	4:25
17.	"Who Killed Davey Moore?" (October 26, 1963)	live at Carnegie Hall	3:09
18.	"Only a Hobo" (August 12, 1963)	The Times They Are A-Changin' outtake	3:29
19.	"Moonshiner" (traditional) (August 12, 1963)	The Times They Are A-Changin' outtake	5:06
20.	"When the Ship Comes In" (1963)	demo for the Witmark Music Publishing Company	2:55
21.	"The Times They Are A-Changin' " (1963)	demo for the Witmark Music Publishing Company	3:00
22.	"Last Thoughts on Woody Guthrie" (April 12, 1963)	poem recited live in concert at New York City's Town Hall	7:07
Total length:			77:03

Disc two — Volume Two
No.	Title	Source	Length
1.	"Seven Curses" (August 6, 1963)	The Times They Are A-Changin' outtake	3:49
2.	"Eternal Circle" (October 24, 1963)	The Times They Are A-Changin' outtake	2:38
3.	"Suze (The Cough Song)" (October 24, 1963)	The Times They Are A-Changin' outtake	1:58
4.	"Mama, You Been on My Mind" (June 9, 1964)	Another Side of Bob Dylan outtake	2:56
5.	"Farewell, Angelina" (January 13, 1965)	Bringing It All Back Home outtake	5:27
6.	"Subterranean Homesick Blues" (January 13, 1965)	Bringing It All Back Home alternate take	2:56
7.	"If You Gotta Go, Go Now" (January 15, 1965)	Bringing It All Back Home outtake	2:56
8.	"Sitting on a Barbed Wire Fence" (June 15, 1965)	Highway 61 Revisited outtake	3:54
9.	"Like a Rolling Stone" (June 15, 1965)	Highway 61 Revisited alternate take	1:36
10.	"It Takes a Lot to Laugh, It Takes a Train to Cry" (June 15, 1965)	Highway 61 Revisited alternate take	3:22
11.	"I'll Keep It with Mine" (January 27, 1966)	Blonde on Blonde outtake	3:39
12.	"She's Your Lover Now" (January 21, 1966)	Blonde on Blonde outtake	6:10
13.	"I Shall Be Released" (Fall 1967)	Basement Tape recording	3:56
14.	"Santa-Fe" (Fall 1967)	Basement Tape recording	2:10
15.	"If Not for You" (May 1, 1970)	New Morning alternate take	3:33
16.	"Wallflower" (November 4, 1971)	previously unreleased recording	2:49
17.	"Nobody 'Cept You" (November 2, 1973)	Planet Waves outtake	2:41
18.	"Tangled Up in Blue" (September 19, 1974)	Blood on the Tracks alternate take	6:51
19.	"Call Letter Blues" (September 16, 1974)	Blood on the Tracks outtake	4:27
20.	"Idiot Wind" (September 19, 1974)	Blood on the Tracks alternate take	8:52
Total length:			76:40

Disc three — Volume Three
No.	Title	Source	Length
1.	"If You See Her, Say Hello" (September 16, 1974)	Blood on the Tracks alternate take	3:45
2.	"Golden Loom" (July 30, 1975)	Desire outtake	4:26
3.	"Catfish" (Bob Dylan / Jacques Levy) (July 28, 1975)	Desire outtake	2:48
4.	"Seven Days" (April 21, 1976)	live performance, Tampa, Florida	4:00
5.	"Ye Shall Be Changed" (May 2, 1979)	Slow Train Coming outtake	4:09
6.	"Every Grain of Sand" (September 23, 1980)	publishing demo for Special Rider Music	3:38
7.	"You Changed My Life" (April 23, 1981)	Shot of Love outtake	5:14
8.	"Need a Woman" (May 4, 1981)	Shot of Love outtake	5:43
9.	"Angelina" (May 4, 1981)	Shot of Love outtake	6:57
10.	"Someone's Got a Hold of My Heart" (April 25, 1983)	Infidels outtake	4:33
11.	"Tell Me" (April 21, 1983)	Infidels outtake	4:24
12.	"Lord Protect My Child" (May 3, 1983)	Infidels outtake	3:57
13.	"Foot of Pride" (April 25, 1983)	Infidels outtake	5:57
14.	"Blind Willie McTell" (May 5, 1983)	Infidels outtake	5:52
15.	"When the Night Comes Falling from the Sky" (February 19, 1985)	Empire Burlesque alternate take	5:37
16.	"Series of Dreams" (March 23, 1989)	Oh Mercy outtake; remixed January 1991	5:52
Total length:			76:52

== Personnel ==
Sorted by first appearance, then alphabetically.

- Bob Dylan — vocals (all), guitars (disc 1, tracks 1–19; disc 2, tracks 1–10, 12–20; disc 3, tracks 1–5, 7–13, 15, 16), harmonica (disc 1, tracks 2, 3, 6, 8, 9, 12–16, 18, 19; disc 2, tracks 3, 5–7, 9, 10, 15; disc 3, tracks 3, 10, 12, 13), piano (disc 1, tracks 15, 16, 20, 21; disc 2, tracks 11; disc 3, tracks 6, 14)
- Al Gorgoni — guitar (disc 2, track 7)
- Bobby Gregg — drums (disc 2, tracks 7, 8, 10 & 11)
- Paul Griffin — keyboards (disc 2, tracks 7, 8, & 10)
- Joseph Macho Jr. — bass guitar (disc 2, track 7)
- Kenny Rankin — guitar (disc 2, track 7)
- Mike Bloomfield — electric guitar (disc 2, tracks 8–10)
- Harvey Brooks — bass guitar (disc 2, tracks 8–10)
- Al Kooper — organ (disc 2, tracks 8–11)
- Rick Danko — bass guitar (disc 2, tracks 11–14, 17), backing vocals (disc 2, track 13)
- Robbie Robertson — guitar (disc 2, tracks 11–14, 17)
- Garth Hudson — organ (disc 2, tracks 12–14, 17)
- Sandy Konikoff — drums (disc 2, track 12)
- Richard Manuel — piano (disc 2, tracks 12–14, 17), backing vocals (disc 2, track 13)
- Levon Helm — drums (disc 2, tracks 13, 14, & 17), backing vocals (disc 2, track 13)
- Charlie Daniels — bass guitar (disc 2, track 15)
- George Harrison — guitar (disc 2, track 15)
- Russ Kunkel — drums (disc 2, track 15)
- Russell Bridges (Leon Russell) — bass guitar (disc 2, track 16)
- Kenny Buttrey — drums (disc 2, track 16)
- Ben Keith — pedal steel guitar (disc 2, track 16)
- Tony Brown — bass guitar (disc 2, tracks 18–20)
- Charlie Brown, III — guitar (disc 2, track 19; disc 3, track 1; possibly disc 2, track 18)
- Buddy Cage — pedal steel guitar (disc 2, track 19 (uncredited))
- Richard Crooks — drums (disc 2, track 19)
- Barry Kornfeld — guitar (disc 2, track 19; disc 3, track 1; possibly disc 2, track 18)
- Tom McFaul — keyboards (disc 2, track 19)
- Eric Weissberg — guitar (disc 2, track 19; disc 3, track 1; possibly disc 2, track 18)
- Emmylou Harris — backing vocals (disc 3, track 2)
- Scarlet Rivera — violin (disc 3, tracks 2 & 4)
- Rob Stoner — bass guitar (disc 3, tracks 2–4)
- Howie Wyeth — drums (disc 3, track 2 & 4)
- Sugar Blue — harmonica (disc 3, track 3)
- Erik Frandsen — slide guitar (disc 3, track 3)
- Gary Burke — conga drum (disc 3, track 4)
- T Bone Burnett — guitar (disc 3, track 4)
- David Mansfield — mandolin (disc 3, track 4)
- Bob Neuwirth — guitar (disc 3, track 4)
- Mick Ronson — guitar (disc 3, track 4)
- Steven Soles — guitar (disc 3, track 4)
- Barry Beckett – keyboards (disc 3, track 5)
- Tim Drummond — bass guitar (disc 3, tracks 5 & 7, possibly 8 & 9)
- Mark Knopfler — guitar (disc 3, tracks 5, 10–14)
- Pick Withers — drums (disc 3, track 5)
- Fred Tackett — guitar (disc 3, track 6 & 9)
- Jennifer Warnes — backing vocals (disc 3, track 6)
- Jim Keltner — drums (disc 3, track 7, possibly tracks 8 & 9)
- Clydie King — backing vocals (disc 3, track 7, possibly tracks 8 & 9)
- Danny "Kootch" Kortchmar — guitar (disc 3, track 7)
- Steve Ripley — guitar (disc 3, track 7)
- Benmont Tench — organ (disc 3, track 7, possibly tracks 8 & 9)
- Carolyn Dennis — backing vocals (possibly disc 3, tracks 8 & 9)
- Regina Havis — backing vocals (possibly disc 3, tracks 8 & 9)
- Alan Clark — keyboards (disc 3, tracks 10–12), organ (disc 3, track 13)
- Sly Dunbar— drums (disc 3, tracks 10–13, 15)
- Robbie Shakespeare — bass guitar (disc 3, tracks 10–13, 15)
- Mick Taylor — guitar (disc 3, tracks 10–13)
- Full Force — backing vocals (disc 3, track 11)
- Roy Bittan — keyboards (disc 3, track 15)
- Steven Van Zandt — guitar (disc 3, track 15)
- Roddy Colonna — drums (disc 3, track 16)
- Rick DiFonzi — guitar (disc 3, track 16)
- Glen Fukunaga — bass guitar (disc 3, track 16)
- Daniel Lanois — guitar, 12-string guitar, bass guitar, percussion (disc 3, track 16)
- Cyril Neville — talking drum (disc 3, track 16)
- Mason Ruffner — guitar (disc 3, track 16)
- Peter Wood — keyboards (disc 3, track 16)

Technical personnel

- Jeff Rosen — production and compilation
- Vic Anesini, Bob Irwin — digital remastering
- Josh Abbey, Jim Ball, Tim Geelan — mixing
- Steven Berkowitz — production coordination, marketing
- Christopher Austopchuk, Nicky Lindeman — art direction
- Don Hunstein, Morgan Renard — photography
- John Bauldie — liner notes

== Charts ==
Chart performance for The Bootleg Series Volumes 1–3 (Rare & Unreleased) 1961–1991
Chart (1991)	Peak position
Australian Albums (ARIA)	46
Belgian Albums (Ultratop Wallonia)	190
Canada Top Albums/CDs (RPM)	79
New Zealand Albums (RMNZ)	34
Norwegian Albums (VG-lista)	16
Swedish Albums (Sverigetopplistan)	32
Swiss Albums (Schweizer Hitparade)	27
UK Albums (Official Charts)	32
US Billboard 200	49
