= Most of the Time =

1989 song by Bob Dylan

Promotional single by Bob Dylan

from the album Oh Mercy
- Released: September 18, 1989
- Recorded: March/April 1989
- Studio: Mobile studio at 1305 Soniat St., New Orleans
- Genre: Folk rock
- Length: 5:02
- Label: Columbia
- Songwriter: Bob Dylan
- Producer: Daniel Lanois

Oh Mercy track listing
- 10 tracks: 1. "Political World"; 2. "Where Teardrops Fall"; 3. "Everything Is Broken"; 4. "Ring Them Bells"; 5. "Man in the Long Black Coat"; 6. "Most of the Time"; 7. "What Good Am I?"; 8. "Disease of Conceit"; 9. "What Was It You Wanted"; 10. "Shooting Star"

"Most of the Time" is a song written and performed by American singer-songwriter Bob Dylan, released as the sixth track (or the first song on Side Two of the vinyl) of his 1989 album Oh Mercy. The song was written by Dylan and produced by Daniel Lanois. The album version of "Most of the Time" was recorded on March 12, 1989, in a mobile studio at 1305 Soniat St., New Orleans, and released on Oh Mercy in September of that year. Two studio out-takes from the same set of recording sessions were released on The Bootleg Series Vol. 8: Tell Tale Signs: Rare and Unreleased 1989–2006 in 2008, and a new version recorded on March 16, 1990, was issued as a promotional single and video in 1990.

The recordings for Oh Mercy were influenced by the Neville Brothers' album Yellow Moon, which was produced by Lanois and included two covers of Dylan's songs. "Most of the Time" is a love ballad that has been described as a fan favorite. Its popularity was aided by its being featured in the 2000 film High Fidelity.

== Recording and composition ==
After his involvement with the Traveling Wilburys, Dylan had started constructing what he referred to as "stream-of consciousness songs". Following a recommendation by Bono, Dylan arranged to meet producer Daniel Lanois in September 1988, and attended recording sessions for the Neville Brothers album Yellow Moon, which included two covers of Dylan's songs. The pair agreed to meet again the following year and in March 1989, Dylan went back to New Orleans to meet Lanois, having asked him to produce an album using the same techniques utilised for Yellow Moon. The tracks for Dylan's 1989 album Oh Mercy were recorded over the next four months, with musicians selected by Lanois. After the initial session, Lanois changed the musicians involved, inviting Yellow Moon contributors Tony Hall, Brian Stoltz and "Mean" Willie Green III. Lanois would set up a mobile studio at a location convenient to the artist or group he was working with. For the sessions with Dylan, he rented a house at 1305 Soniat Street, New Orleans, and set up the studio on the ground floor with the musicians arranged in a semi-circle around the soundboard. Dylan later called the setup "comfortable" and said that he appreciated the flexibility of being able to record at any time, and without having to experience the people and distractions associated with going into a typical recording studio.

The lyrics of "Most of the Time" were written before the music. In his memoir Chronicles: Volume One, Dylan describes not having a melody for the song when he first went into the studio to record it and trying to find one while strumming an acoustic guitar in front of Lanois: "Dan thought he heard something. Something that turned into a slow melancholy song". Lanois's recollection differs from Dylan's, as he told an interviewer in 2014 that he first heard the song at Dylan's house, with Dylan playing piano. In the same interview, Lanois said that the song "It stood out to me as a very powerful expression of love. I was determined to frame that song the best I could." In their book Bob Dylan All the Songs: The Story Behind Every Track, authors Philippe Margotin and Jean-Michel Guesdon praise Lanois's production for "putting magic into the essence of the song" and creating "an amazingly dreamlike and haunting atmosphere. Very deep reverb, omnipresent delays, saturated guitar sounds (with or without vibrato), a Roland TR-808 drum machine set in a loop, percussion, a sonic blanket, bass and acoustic guitar give the song one of the strongest vibes on the album. Dylan provided a superb vocal performance". Lanois played bass on the track, and overdubbed four Les Paul parts to produce a "string quartet effect". Dylan said that Lanois was able capture his "stage voice" during the Oh Mercy recordings, and that he appreciated Lanois's willingness to make suggestions, stating "You need help to make a record ... People expect me to bring in a Bob Dylan song, sing it, and then they record it. Other people don't work that way. There's more feedback".

== Personnel ==
According to the liner notes of the album

- Bob Dylan – vocals, guitar
- Daniel Lanois – guitar
- Malcolm Burn – keyboards
- Tony Hall – bass
- Willie Green – drums
- Cyril Neville – percussion

== Interpretations ==
Lyrically, the song is a ballad that features the rhetorical device of a narrator repeatedly insisting that he has gotten over the heartbreak of a past relationship by describing how content he feels "most of the time" – thus implying that some of the time he is still affected. The song starts with the narrator stating that most of the time he is focused and can stay on track, before mentioning after seven lines that "I don't even notice she's gone / Most of the time". Christopher Ricks notes that it is not the case that "Most of the time, 'Most of the Time' consists of repeating the words 'Most of the time'" because only 14 of the 44 lines of the song contain the phrase. He says that the song "embodies and scrutinizes the difficulty of being entirely honest with yourself when still in pain". Ricks claims that the "nub" of the song is perhaps contained in lines of the third verse:

I don't build up illusion till it makes me sick
I ain't afraid of confusion no matter how thick
I can smile in the face of mankind
Don't even remember what her lips felt like on mine
Most of the time

Ricks comments that the "at once overt and covert" rhyme between "illusion" and "confusion", is a device that only occurs here in the song; and that following the common phrase "in the face of" with the line about not remembering "how her lips felt" brings a "corporeality" to the lines. Margotin and Guesdon see the song's lyrics as bearing a similarity to Dylan's earlier "Don't Think Twice, It's All Right" but ask, "Is the narrator telling the truth?" Tony Attwood agrees with this "unreliable narrator" interpretation and describes the music as purposefully contradicting the lyrics, "which assert throughout that the singer knows exactly what is going on and can handle it. The music suggests totally he can't and we know the music is right and the lyrics are wrong. He's fooling himself from the opening chord. (In musical terms it is the sub-dominant – which fools us – even if we know no music – into thinking we are somewhere else, before the singing starts)". Oliver Trager feels that the song may well be autobiographical, and Seth Rogovoy pondered whether the song might reference Sara Dylan, whereas Paul Williams thinks the song's narrator is a fictional character, although influenced by Dylan's own experience.

== Critical reception and legacy ==
Oh Mercy received a positive critical reception, with a number of critics opining that "Most of the Time" was a standout track. Larry Nager called the track an "imitation" of the Velvet Underground's style, and Paul Willistein said that it sounded like a combination of "All the Tired Horses" and the Velvet Underground's "Sweet Jane". The simplicity of the lyrics was seen as a positive by Robin Denselow, whilst Randy Lewis felt that the repeated use of the phrase "most of the time" was like a "depth charge". Several reviewers referred to the use of irony in the lyrics, while Seth Rogovoy felt that it was the music that made the song ironic.

Whilst a number of reviewers praised Lanois's production, Mark LePage felt that the song was the only one on the album to be "overwhelmed by Lanois's ... production atmospherics". Michael Snyder felt that the song showed that Dylan rather than Lanois was "really in charge," and claimed that "its sentiments show the man behind the myth of Bob Dylan". The track has been called a "fan favorite". When Bono wrote 60 thank-you letters about "songs that saved his life" in 2020, he included "Most of the Time".

The Guardian ranked the song 27th on a 2020 list of "Bob Dylan's 50 Greatest Songs". An article accompanying the list noted how the song demonstrates "how Dylan had recovered from an artistic slump: the lyrical drawing of the emotional fallout from a failed relationship is both sharp and sensitive, his delivery is perfectly judged". Spectrum Culture included "Most of the Time" on a list of "Bob Dylan's 20 Best Songs of the '80s". In an article accompanying the list, critic Jacob Nierenberg calls it the best song on Oh Mercy, writing, "It can be heard as a long-delayed coda to Blood on the Tracks, Dylan's supposed 'breakup album'. Just as Dylan was in denial about the songs he wrote for that album being allusions to his own crumbling marriage, the singer here is in denial about his ongoing heartbreak, and the façade gets more and more transparent with every passing verse".

Chris Shields, writing in the St. Cloud Times, described the song as the centerpiece of Oh Mercy: "The ambiance of the album, the consistent tone, feels like an emotional build to 'Most of the Time'. Dylan is introspective, retrospective, talking of thoughts and feelings and regrets in a very simple, very clear way, but it is so artfully done, each verse a triumph of memory and mood".

The song placed fourth in a 2015 Rolling Stone readers' poll of "The 10 Best Bob Dylan Songs of the 1980s". In an article accompanying the list, critic Andy Greene called it "a haunting tune of regret from Oh Mercy. Much like 'Everything Is Broken', they are the words of a man that's made more than a few mistakes, though this one is dipped in heartbreak. 'Most of the time', he sings. 'She ain't even in my mind/I wouldn't know her if I saw her/She's that far behind'". Jim Beviglia's 2013 book Counting Down Bob Dylan: His 100 Finest Songs ranks the song 31st, praising the lyrics, production and performance, and saying that people who have been through troubles in their romantic relationships will be able to relate to the song.

The Big Issue placed it at #25 on a 2021 list of the "80 best Bob Dylan songs – that aren't the greatest hits" and called it "Melodic malaise". A 2021 Guardian article included it on a list of "80 Bob Dylan songs everyone should know".

== In popular culture ==
The song is prominently featured towards the end of Stephen Frears's 2000 film High Fidelity. John Cusack, the film's producer, co-writer and star, was proud of getting permission to use the song as well as its placement within the film, about which he said, "I think we used it really beautifully".

== Other versions ==
Bob Dylan in a screen capture from the "Most of the Time" music video

Dylan recorded three studio versions of the song at the Record Plant in Los Angeles, California on March 16, 1990, during sessions for his album Under the Red Sky. The performance was filmed with Dylan and band playing live on camera for a music video directed by Dylan's son Jesse Dylan. Dylan was accompanied by Under the Red Sky session players David Lindley on guitar, Randy Jackson on bass and Kenny Aronoff on drums for this performance, which was produced by Don Was. A promotional CD (Columbia CSK 73326) was sent to radio stations including this "live" video version, the original Oh Mercy version, and an edit of the Oh Mercy version running 3 minutes and 55 seconds. Jesse Dylan later said that as his father is not proficient at lip-synching, "we did a lot of fast cuts from him singing live to thematic material using the actual track. So he never had to lip-synch. He looks great and it doesn't look directed. You create a space for Bob to be Bob". Williams felt that the video version lacked the impact of the album version, and Heylin has dismissed it as a "thudding threnody".

Two alternate takes of the song from the Oh Mercy sessions, one featuring Dylan solo on acoustic guitar and harmonica, were included on the album The Bootleg Series Vol. 8: Tell Tale Signs: Rare and Unreleased 1989–2006.

== Live performances ==
Dylan's first live performance of "Most of the Time" was on October 10, 1989, at the Beacon Theatre (New York City); and the last was on May 9, 1992, when he played it at the San Jose State Event Center. Clinton Heylin has commented that Dylan performed the song live in a variety of ways, initially at the Beacon theatre as a "yearning paean to possibilities" and finally as a "song of quiet desperation" at the San Jose show, whilst a performance at Hammersmith Odeon on February 7, 1990, saw it presented as a "genuine statement of affirmation".

== Releases ==
Two versions of the song were recorded on March 8, 1990, and six on March 12. Dylan recorded new vocals on March 16 and April 12. Official releases are listed below. On Oh Mercy, the song appears as the sixth track (and is the first song on side two of the vinyl version), with a duration of five minutes and two seconds.

Releases for "Most of the Time"
| | Work | Release year | Recorded at | Recording date | Take | Personnel | Ref. |
|---|---|---|---|---|---|---|---|
| 1 | Oh Mercy | 1989 | Mobile studio at 1305 Soniat St., New Orleans | March 12, 1989 | 3 | Bob Dylan: vocals, guitar; Mason Ruffner (guitar), Daniel Lanois: guitar, piano; Tony Hall: bass; Cyril Neville: timbales, tom-toms; Willie Green (drums). Overdubs (added April 19, 1989): Malcolm Burn: bass | |
| 2 | Promotional single (Columbia CSK 73326) | 1990 | Culver City Studios, Los Angeles | March 16, 1990 | 1.2 | Bob Dylan (guitar, vocal), David Lindley (guitar); Randy Jackson (bass); Kenny Aronoff (drums) | |
| 3 | Promotional video | 1990 | Culver City Studios, Los Angeles | March 16, 1990 | 3 | Bob Dylan (guitar, vocal), David Lindley (guitar); Randy Jackson (bass); Kenny Aronoff (drums) | |
| 4 | The Bootleg Series Vol. 8: Tell Tale Signs: Rare and Unreleased 1989–2006 | 2008 | Mobile studio at 1305 Soniat St., New Orleans | March 12, 1989 | unknown | Bob Dylan: vocals, guitar | |
| 5 | The Bootleg Series Vol. 8: Tell Tale Signs: Rare and Unreleased 1989–2006 | 2008 | Mobile studio at 1305 Soniat St., New Orleans | March 12, 1989 | 5 | Bob Dylan: vocals, guitar; Mason Ruffner: guitar; Daniel Lanois: guitar, piano; Tony Hall: bass; Cyril Neville: timbales, tom-toms; Willie Green (drums). Overdubs (added April 19, 1989): Malcolm Burn: bass | |
| 6 | Pure Dylan | 2011 | Mobile studio at 1305 Soniat St., New Orleans | March 12, 1989 | 5 | Bob Dylan: vocals, guitar; Mason Ruffner: guitar; Daniel Lanois: guitar, piano; Tony Hall: bass; Cyril Neville: timbales, tom-toms; Willie Green (drums). Overdubs (added April 19, 1989): Malcolm Burn: bass | |
| 7 | The Best of The Bootleg Series | 2020 | Mobile studio at 1305 Soniat St., New Orleans | March 12, 1989 | 5 | Bob Dylan: vocals, guitar; Mason Ruffner: guitar; Daniel Lanois: guitar, piano; Tony Hall: bass; Cyril Neville: timbales, tom-toms; Willie Green (drums). Overdubs (added April 19, 1989): Malcolm Burn: bass | |

== Notable covers ==
The song has been covered by over a dozen other artists. Among the versions:

- The Stone Coyotes covered it on their 2017 album Sally in the Doorway.
- Lloyd Cole covered and released it as the B-side of his 1995 single "Like Lovers Do".
- Ani DiFranco played it live in concert in 1997 and 1998.
- Sophie Zelmani's version appeared on the soundtrack to Masked and Anonymous in 2003.
- Bettye LaVette covered it in 2012 for the Chimes of Freedom compilation album.
- Luna covered it on their 2017 album A Sentimental Education.
- Former Luna band members Dean & Britta then re-recorded it for their 2020 album The Quarantine Tapes.
- Jason Lytle for Uncut magazine's "Dylan Revisited" compilation in 2021.
- Luther Black (a pseudonym of The dB's bassist Rick Wagner) and the Cold Hard Facts covered and released it as a single in 2021.

== See also ==
- Chronicles: Volume One
