= Chimes of Freedom (album) =

2012 compilation album by various artists

Chimes of Freedom: The Songs of Bob Dylan Honoring 50 Years of Amnesty International

Compilation album by Various artists
- Released: January 24, 2012 (USA & Canada) February 6, 2012 (Rest of the World)
- Genre: Rock, pop, folk, country, punk, blues, jazz, alt-rock
- Length: 5 hr 21 min
- Label: Amnesty International distributed by Fontana
- Producer: Jeff Ayeroff, Julie Yannatta. (Executive Producers); Helen Garrett, Karen Scott (Executive Producers for Amnesty International); Martin Lewis (Contributing Producer)

Professional ratings
Review scores
Source	Rating
AllMusic	3.5/5 stars
Rolling Stone	3/5 stars

Chimes of Freedom: The Songs of Bob Dylan Honoring 50 Years of Amnesty International is a charity compilation album featuring new recordings of compositions by Bob Dylan by multiple artists, released on January 24, 2012. Proceeds from the album were donated to the human rights organization Amnesty International. It debuted in the U.S. at number 11 on the Billboard 200 with 22,000 copies sold while the 2-CD version available at Starbucks debuted at number 38 with more than 10,200 copies sold.

Featured artists include Diana Krall, Johnny Cash, Adele, Miley Cyrus, My Chemical Romance, Silversun Pickups, Kesha, The Gaslight Anthem, Pete Townshend, Seal, Jeff Beck, Elvis Costello, Mark Knopfler, Darren Criss, Eric Burdon, Sting, Patti Smith, My Morning Jacket, Pete Seeger, Steve Earle and Rise Against.

The 4-disc CD version of the album features 73 tracks - with a further 3 tracks available on a digital-only basis - making for a total of 76 tracks. Among the 76 recordings is Bob Dylan's original 1964 recording of the title track. Of the other 75 tracks, 69 were brand-new studio recordings purpose-made for the album. The other 6 tracks were recent live performances recorded for other purposes by the artists and subsequently donated for inclusion on the album.

== Track listing ==
All tracks are written by Bob Dylan as sole composer - with four exceptions: Two songs co-written by Dylan, one title an arrangement by Dylan of a traditional song and one title a traditional song arranged by a fellow folksinger. All four exceptions are noted after the pertinent song title.

Disc 1
No.	Title	Artist(s)	Length
1.	"One Too Many Mornings" (released on The Times They Are a-Changin'; 1964)	Johnny Cash feat. The Avett Brothers	3:48
2.	"Leopard-Skin Pill-Box Hat" (released on Blonde on Blonde; 1966)	Raphael Saadiq	3:43
3.	"Drifter's Escape" (released on John Wesley Harding; 1967)	Patti Smith	3:22
4.	"Ballad of Hollis Brown" (released on The Times They Are a-Changin'; 1964)	Rise Against	5:12
5.	"Blind Willie McTell" (outtake from Infidels; 1983)	The Nightwatchman	5:16
6.	"Corrina, Corrina" (traditional - arranged by Dylan) (released on The Freewheelin' Bob Dylan; 1963)	Pete Townshend	2:34
7.	"Most of the Time" (released on Oh Mercy; 1989)	Bettye LaVette	5:16
8.	"This Wheel's on Fire" (Bob Dylan & Danko) (released on The Basement Tapes; 1975)	Charlie Winston	3:07
9.	"Simple Twist of Fate" (released on Blood on the Tracks; 1975)	Diana Krall	3:51
10.	"You Ain't Goin' Nowhere" (released on Bob Dylan's Greatest Hits Vol. II; 1971)	Brett Dennen	3:04
11.	"Love Sick" (released on Time Out of Mind; 1997)	Mariachi El Bronx	3:42
12.	"Blowin' in the Wind" (released on The Freewheelin' Bob Dylan; 1963)	Ziggy Marley	2:43
13.	"Changing of the Guards" (released on Street-Legal; 1978)	The Gaslight Anthem	5:23
14.	"Not Dark Yet" (released on Time Out of Mind; 1997)	Silversun Pickups	6:23
15.	"You're a Big Girl Now" (released on Blood on the Tracks; 1975)	My Morning Jacket	5:11
16.	"Boots of Spanish Leather" (released on The Times They Are a-Changin'; 1964)	The Airborne Toxic Event	5:12
17.	"Girl from the North Country" (released on The Freewheelin' Bob Dylan; 1963, and on Nashville Skyline; 1969)	Sting	2:54
18.	"Restless Farewell" (released on The Times They Are a-Changin'; 1964)	Mark Knopfler	5:52

Disc 2
No.	Title	Artist(s)	Length
1.	"Outlaw Blues" (released on Bringing It All Back Home; 1965)	Queens of the Stone Age	4:09
2.	"Rainy Day Women #12 & 35" (released on Blonde on Blonde; 1966)	Lenny Kravitz	4:08
3.	"One More Cup of Coffee (Valley Below)" (released on Desire; 1976)	Steve Earle & Lucia Micarelli	4:44
4.	"Heart of Mine" (released on Shot of Love; 1981)	Blake Mills featuring Danielle Haim	5:31
5.	"You're Gonna Make Me Lonesome When You Go" (released on Blood on the Tracks; 1975)	Miley Cyrus	3:33
6.	"Lay Down Your Weary Tune" (outtake from The Times They Are a-Changin'; 1964)	Billy Bragg	4:19
7.	"License to Kill" (released on Infidels; 1983)	Elvis Costello	5:13
8.	"Lay, Lady, Lay" (released on Nashville Skyline; 1969)	Angelique Kidjo	3:09
9.	"Ring Them Bells" (released on Oh Mercy; 1989)	Natasha Bedingfield	4:09
10.	"Love Minus Zero/No Limit" (released on Bringing It All Back Home; 1965)	Jackson Browne	4:21
11.	"Seven Curses" (live) (outtake from The Times They Are a-Changin'; 1964)	Joan Baez	5:05
12.	"No Time to Think" (released on Street-Legal; 1978)	The Belle Brigade	8:06
13.	"Tonight I'll Be Staying Here with You" (live) (released on Nashville Skyline; 1969)	Sugarland	3:57
14.	"Mr. Tambourine Man" (released on Bringing It All Back Home; 1965)	Jack's Mannequin	4:27
15.	"4th Time Around" (released on Blonde on Blonde; 1966)	Oren Lavie	4:23
16.	"All I Really Want to Do" (released on Another Side of Bob Dylan; 1964)	Sussan Deyhim	5:18
17.	"Make You Feel My Love" (recorded Live at WXPN) (released on Time Out of Mind; 1997)	Adele	4:07

Disc 3
No.	Title	Artist(s)	Length
1.	"With God on Our Side" (released on The Times They Are a-Changin'; 1964)	K'naan	3:40
2.	"I Want You" (released on Blonde on Blonde; 1966)	Ximena Sariñana	3:37
3.	"She Belongs to Me" (released on Bringing It All Back Home; 1965)	Neil Finn with Pajama Club	2:58
4.	"Bob Dylan's Dream" (released on The Freewheelin' Bob Dylan; 1963)	Bryan Ferry	3:55
5.	"Tomorrow Is a Long Time" (released on Bob Dylan's Greatest Hits Vol. II; 1971)	Zee Avi	3:59
6.	"Just Like a Woman" (released on Blonde on Blonde; 1966)	Carly Simon	5:12
7.	"The Times They Are a-Changin'" (released on The Times They Are a-Changin'; 1964)	Flogging Molly	3:02
8.	"Buckets of Rain" (released on Blood on the Tracks; 1975)	Fistful of Mercy	3:14
9.	"Man of Peace" (released on Infidels; 1983)	Joe Perry	7:43
10.	"It's All Over Now, Baby Blue" (released on Bringing It All Back Home; 1965)	Bad Religion	3:06
11.	"Desolation Row (Live)" (released on Highway 61 Revisited; 1965)	My Chemical Romance	3:01
12.	"Knockin' on Heaven's Door" (released on Pat Garrett & Billy the Kid; 1973)	RedOne featuring Nabil Khayat	3:52
13.	"Abandoned Love" (outtake from Desire; 1976)	Paul Rodgers & Nils Lofgren	4:32
14.	"New Morning" (released on New Morning; 1970)	Darren Criss featuring Chuck Criss of Freelance Whales	3:07
15.	"The Lonesome Death of Hattie Carroll" (released on The Times They Are a-Changin'; 1964)	Cage the Elephant	5:02
16.	"It Ain't Me, Babe" (released on Another Side of Bob Dylan; 1964)	Band of Skulls	3:23
17.	"Property of Jesus" (released on Shot of Love; 1981)	Sinéad O'Connor	3:36
18.	"Shelter from the Storm" (released on Blood on the Tracks; 1975)	Ed Roland and The Sweet Tea Project	4:12
19.	"Don't Think Twice, It's All Right" (released on The Freewheelin' Bob Dylan; 1963)	Kesha	3:49
20.	"Don't Think Twice, It's All Right" (instrumental) (released on The Freewheelin' Bob Dylan; 1963)	Kronos Quartet	4:03

Disc 4
No.	Title	Artist(s)	Length
1.	"I Shall Be Released" (released on Bob Dylan's Greatest Hits Vol. II; 1971)	Maroon 5	4:10
2.	"Political World" (released on Oh Mercy; 1989)	Carolina Chocolate Drops	2:49
3.	"Like a Rolling Stone" (released on Highway 61 Revisited; 1965)	Seal & Jeff Beck	7:25
4.	"Bob Dylan's 115th Dream" (released on Bringing It All Back Home; 1965)	Taj Mahal & The Phantom Blues Band	5:01
5.	"Senor (Tales of Yankee Power)" (live) (released on Street-Legal; 1978)	Dierks Bentley	3:51
6.	"One of Us Must Know (Sooner or Later)" (released on Blonde on Blonde; 1966)	Mick Hucknall	4:59
7.	"I'll Remember You" (released on Empire Burlesque; 1985)	Thea Gilmore	4:48
8.	"John Brown" (released under the pseudonym Blind Boy Grunt on Broadside Ballads, Vol. 1; 1963)	State Radio	4:49
9.	"All Along the Watchtower" (live) (released on John Wesley Harding; 1967)	Dave Matthews Band	7:03
10.	"Subterranean Homesick Blues" (released on Bringing It All Back Home; 1965)	Michael Franti	2:18
11.	"Mama, You Been on My Mind" (outtake from Another Side of Bob Dylan; 1964)	We Are Augustines	3:30
12.	"Tryin' to Get to Heaven" (released on Time Out of Mind; 1997)	Lucinda Williams	4:42
13.	"Quinn the Eskimo (The Mighty Quinn)" (released on Self Portrait; 1970)	Kris Kristofferson	2:38
14.	"Gotta Serve Somebody" (released on Slow Train Coming; 1979)	Eric Burdon	4:57
15.	"I'd Have You Anytime" (Bob Dylan & George Harrison) (released on Harrison's All Things Must Pass; 1970)	Evan Rachel Wood	3:54
16.	"Baby, Let Me Follow You Down" (live) (traditional arranged by Eric von Schmidt) (released on Bob Dylan; 1962)	Marianne Faithfull	2:28
17.	"Forever Young" (released on Planet Waves; 1974)	Pete Seeger with the Rivertown Kids	3:15
18.	"Chimes of Freedom" (released on Another Side of Bob Dylan; 1964)	Bob Dylan	7:13

Digital bonus tracks
No.	Title	Artist(s)	Length
1.	"When the Ship Comes In" (released on The Times They Are a-Changin'; 1964)	Outernational	3:27
2.	"Song to Woody" (released on Bob Dylan; 1962)	Silverstein	2:12
3.	"Man in the Long Black Coat" (released on Oh Mercy; 1989)	Daniel Bedingfield	2:27

== Music videos ==
Of the 69 new studio recordings, Amnesty made music videos for 16 tracks.

- Jeff Beck & Seal - "Like a Rolling Stone"
- Eric Burdon - "Gotta Serve Somebody"
- Darren Criss - "New Morning"
- Miley Cyrus - "You're Gonna Make Me Lonesome When You Go"
- Neil Finn with Pajama Club - "She Belongs to Me"
- Flogging Molly - "The Times They Are A-Changin'"
- Kris Kristofferson - "Quinn the Eskimo (The Mighty Quinn)"
- Oren Lavie - "4th Time Around"
- Outernational - "When the Ship Comes In"
- Joe Perry - "Man of Peace"
- Rise Against - "Ballad Of Hollis Brown"
- Pete Seeger - "Forever Young"
- The Airborne Toxic Event - "Boots Of Spanish Leather"
- Pete Townshend - "Corrina, Corrina"
- We Are Augustines - "Mama, You Been On My Mind"
- Evan Rachel Wood - "I'd Have You Anytime"

== Promotional TV performances ==
5 of the artists who recorded tracks made promotional appearances on US or UK TV shows performing their contribution to the album:

- The Avett Brothers - "One Too Many Mornings" - Late Night with Jimmy Fallon
- Dierks Bentley & Punch Brothers - "Señor" - The Ellen DeGeneres Show
- Mick Hucknall - "One of Us Must Know (Sooner or Later)" - The Ronnie Wood Show
- Ziggy Marley - "Blowin' in the Wind" - The Late Show with David Letterman
- Joe Perry - "Man of Peace" - The Tonight Show with Jay Leno

== Mini documentaries ==
Amnesty created "making-of" mini-documentaries about the recording of 9 of the 69 new studio tracks.

- Jeff Beck & Seal: "Like A Rolling Stone"
- Billy Bragg: "Lay Down Your Weary Tune"
- Mick Hucknall: "One Of Us Must Know"
- Joe Perry: "Man Of Peace"
- Rise Against: "Ballad Of Hollis Brown"
- Paul Rodgers & Nils Lofgren: "Abandoned Love"
- Pete Seeger: "Forever Young"
- Pete Townshend: "Corrina Corrina"
- Evan Rachel Wood: "I'd Have You Anytime"

== See also ==
- List of songs written by Bob Dylan
- List of artists who have covered Bob Dylan songs
