= Shooting Star (Bob Dylan song) =

1989 song by Bob Dylan

Song by Bob Dylan

from the album Oh Mercy
- Released: September 18, 1989
- Recorded: March/April 1989
- Studio: Mobile studio at 1305 Soniat St., New Orleans
- Genre: Folk
- Length: 3:12
- Label: Columbia
- Songwriter: Bob Dylan
- Producer: Daniel Lanois

Oh Mercy track listing
- 10 tracks: 1. "Political World"; 2. "Where Teardrops Fall"; 3. "Everything Is Broken"; 4. "Ring Them Bells"; 5. "Man in the Long Black Coat"; 6. "Most of the Time"; 7. "What Good Am I?"; 8. "Disease of Conceit"; 9. "What Was It You Wanted"; 10. "Shooting Star"

"Shooting Star" is a song written and performed by American singer-songwriter Bob Dylan, released in 1989 as the tenth and final track on his album Oh Mercy. It was produced by Daniel Lanois.

== Composition and recording ==
In his memoir Chronicles: Volume One, Dylan recalls writing the song after taking a long motorcycle ride with his wife, Carolyn Dennis, during a break from recording his album Oh Mercy in New Orleans: "The song came to me complete, full in the eyes like I'd been traveling on the garden pathway of the sun and just found it. It was illuminated. I'd seen a shooting star from the backyard of our house, or maybe it was a meteorite".

Dylan scholar Tony Attwood describes it as an otherwise simple song of lost love ("the traveller moving on is the woman, while the man does the 'you wanted me to be someone I couldn't be' thing and is seemingly left behind") that is made more complex by an unusual musical and lyrical bridge in which "all hell breaks loose". Attwood describes how Dylan moves down the chromatic scale note by note in this bridge, only the second time in his career for him to do this (following 1967's "Too Much of Nothing"), as he sings about the apocalypse: "You can hear it by playing each note, black or white, that are next to each other on the piano. Dylan does it starting on C sharp, going down to C, B, B flat, A.

(C sharp minor) Listen to the engine, (C) listen to the bell

(B) As the last fire truck (B flat) from hell

(A) Goes rolling by

(B) All good people are (E) praying

The musical sequence is then revisited

It's the last temptation, the last account

The last time you might hear the sermon on the mount

The last radio is playing".

In their book Bob Dylan All the Songs: The Story Behind Every Track, authors Philippe Margotin and Jean-Michel Guesdon note that, in addition to Dylan on vocals, guitar and harmonica, the song features Daniel Lanois on omnichord ("a plastic instrument that sounds like an autoharp"), Brian Stoltz on guitar, Tony Hall on bass and Willie Green on drums. They also note that Dylan regretted not being able to add a brass section to the track and achieve a more orchestral sound but that his doubts were dispelled when Lanois "hyped the snare and captured the song in its essence" in the final mix.

== Personnel ==
According to the liner notes of the album

- Bob Dylan – vocals, guitar, harmonica
- Brian Stoltz – guitar
- Daniel Lanois – omnichord
- Tony Hall – bass
- Willie Green – drums

== Critical reception ==
Rolling Stone magazine included "Shooting Star" on a list of "Bob Dylan's Greatest Songs of the 1980s", noting that it "echoes some of the self-doubt and regret heard earlier on 'Most of the Time'" while also serving as an example of how "Dylan is very good at ending his albums on exactly the right note".

Spectrum Culture included the song on a list of "Bob Dylan's 20 Best Songs of the 1980s". In an article accompanying the list, critic Justin Cober-Lake praises both the lyrics (for the way Dylan establishes "an almost-narrative and an almost-prayer while leaving any final understanding open-ended enough for the listener to glide into") and the music (for the way "Dylan develops a beautiful melody for his reflections, perfectly embraced by Lanois’ production").

Jim Esch at AllMusic called it "a simple three verse plus bridge country ballad that manages to suggest the arc of an affair – balled up in the image of a shooting star" that is "remarkable for its lyrical allusiveness" and leaves "a weary sadness in its wake".

The Big Issue placed it at #16 on a list of the "80 Best Bob Dylan Songs - That Aren't the Greatest Hits" and characterized it as a "hymn to regret and what might have been".

== Live performances ==
According to his official website, Dylan performed the song 126 times in concert on the Never Ending Tour between 1990 and 2013. A live performance from New York City in 1994 was filmed and officially released on the Bob Dylan MTV Unplugged television special and accompanying live album in 1995. The live debut occurred at the Alpine Valley Music Theatre in East Troy, Wisconsin on June 9, 1990 and the last performance (to date) took place at Blossom Music Center in Cuyahoga Falls, Ohio on September 12, 2024.

== In popular culture ==
The song is prominently featured in Curtis Hanson's Academy Award-winning 2000 film Wonder Boys and on its accompanying soundtrack album.

== Notable covers ==
There have been at least half a dozen studio covers of the song including David Gogo on his 2000 album Bare Bones, Lindsay Evans on her 2006 album Road to Damascus and Laura Pursell on her 2023 album Shooting Star.

Aaron Neville performed the song live at a MusiCares tribute to Dylan in 2015. Dylan praised Neville's performance in an interview shortly after: “I could always hear him singing that song. He's recorded other songs of mine, all great performances, but for some reason I kept thinking about ‘Shooting Star’, something he's never recorded but I knew that he could. I could always hear him singing it for some reason, even when I wrote it. I mean, what can you say? He's the most soulful of singers, maybe in all of recorded history. If angels sing, they must sing in that voice. I just think his gift is so great. The man has no flaws, never has. He's always been one of my favorite singers right from the beginning”.
