= The Best of Bob Dylan (1997 album) =

1997 greatest hits album by Bob Dylan

Greatest hits album by Bob Dylan
- Released: 2 June 1997
- Recorded: 1962–1989
- Genre: Rock; folk; country
- Length: 76:10
- Label: Columbia
- Producer: Barry Beckett; Gordon Carroll; Don DeVito; Bob Dylan; John H. Hammond; Bob Johnston; Mark Knopfler; Daniel Lanois; Leon Russell; Jerry Wexler; Tom Wilson

Bob Dylan chronology
MTV Unplugged (1995)	The Best of Bob Dylan (1997)	Time Out of Mind (1997)

The Best of Bob Dylan is a compilation album released in the United Kingdom, New Zealand, Australia and Canada on 2 June 1997. It was later released in Europe and Japan, although it has never been released in the United States.

== Track listing ==
No.	Title	Original release	Length
1.	"Blowin' in the Wind"	The Freewheelin' Bob Dylan (1963)	2:48
2.	"The Times They Are a-Changin'"	The Times They Are a-Changin' (1964)	3:14
3.	"Don't Think Twice, It's All Right"	The Freewheelin' Bob Dylan	3:40
4.	"Mr. Tambourine Man"	Bringing It All Back Home (1965)	5:29
5.	"Like a Rolling Stone"	Highway 61 Revisited (1965)	6:10
6.	"Just Like a Woman"	Blonde on Blonde (1966)	4:56
7.	"All Along the Watchtower"	John Wesley Harding (1967)	2:33
8.	"Lay Lady Lay"	Nashville Skyline (1969)	3:20
9.	"I Shall Be Released"	Bob Dylan's Greatest Hits Vol. II (1971)	3:05
10.	"If Not for You"	New Morning (1970)	2:43
11.	"Knockin' on Heaven's Door"	Pat Garrett & Billy the Kid (1973)	2:32
12.	"Forever Young"	Planet Waves (1974)	4:58
13.	"Tangled Up in Blue"	Blood on the Tracks (1975)	5:43
14.	"Oh, Sister"	Desire (1976)	4:02
15.	"Gotta Serve Somebody"	Slow Train Coming (1979)	5:25
16.	"Jokerman"	Infidels (1983)	6:17
17.	"Everything Is Broken"	Oh Mercy (1989)	3:15
18.	"Shelter from the Storm" (alternate version)	previously unreleased	6:00
Total length:			76:10

== Charts ==
Chart performance for The Best of Bob Dylan
Chart (1997–1998)	Peak position
Australian Albums (ARIA)	15
Austrian Albums (Ö3 Austria)	20
Belgian Albums (Ultratop Wallonia)	48
Dutch Albums (Album Top 100)	7
Finnish Albums (Suomen virallinen lista)	24
German Albums (Offizielle Top 100)	10
New Zealand Albums (RMNZ)	8
Norwegian Albums (VG-lista)	1
Swedish Albums (Sverigetopplistan)	3
UK Albums (OCC)	6

== Certifications ==
Certifications for The Best of Bob Dylan
Region	Certification	Certified units/sales
Australia (ARIA)	Gold	35,000^{^}
New Zealand (RMNZ)	Gold	7,500^{^}
Norway (IFPI Norway)	Platinum	50,000^{*}
Sweden (GLF)	Gold	40,000^{^}
Summaries
Europe (IFPI)	Platinum	1,000,000^{*}
^{*} Sales figures based on certification alone.^{^} Shipments figures based on certification alone.
