= What Was It You Wanted =

1989 song by Bob Dylan

Song by Bob Dylan

from the album Oh Mercy
- Released: September 18, 1989
- Recorded: March/April 1989
- Studio: Mobile studio at 1305 Soniat St., New Orleans
- Genre: Folk
- Length: 5:02
- Label: Columbia
- Songwriter: Bob Dylan
- Producer: Daniel Lanois

Oh Mercy track listing
- 10 tracks: 1. "Political World"; 2. "Where Teardrops Fall"; 3. "Everything Is Broken"; 4. "Ring Them Bells"; 5. "Man in the Long Black Coat"; 6. "Most of the Time"; 7. "What Good Am I?"; 8. "Disease of Conceit"; 9. "What Was It You Wanted"; 10. "Shooting Star"

"What Was It You Wanted" is a song written and performed by American singer-songwriter Bob Dylan, released in 1989 as the ninth and penultimate track (or fourth song on Side 2 of the vinyl) on his album Oh Mercy. It was produced by Daniel Lanois.

== Composition and recording ==
In his book Bob Dylan, Performing Artist: 1986-1990 and Beyond, Paul Williams characterizes "What Was It You Wanted" as a "special song" in which Dylan attempts to sketch "a picture of what goes on" in his own life. Williams specifically sees the song as "an expansion" of two lines from Dylan's 1973 song "Nobody 'Cept You" ("Everybody wants my attention / Everybody's got something to sell"): Williams notes that there is "always someone who wants something more from [Dylan] more complicated and urgent than an autograph" and that it has been the singer/songwriter's fate to "receive more such entreaties than most celebrities, even Presidents of the United States".

Dylan seemingly agreed with Williams' interpretation when writing about the song in his 2004 memoir Chronicles: Volume One: "If you've ever been the object of curiosity, then you know what this song is about. It doesn't need much explanation". Dylan also cited "What Was It You Wanted" as a song where he "heard the lyric and melody together in my head" when composing it.

Dylan scholar Tony Attwood observes that the song is "in a minor key packed with minor chords", which he claims is fitting since it is narrated by a "lost and bemused individual". The song is also notable for Mason Ruffner's electric guitar part, which Stephen Pate has described as "the main groove of the song with the strong tremolo C#5, F#, A5, progression".

== Personnel ==
According to the liner notes of the album

- Bob Dylan – vocals, guitar, harmonica
- Daniel Lanois – guitar
- Mason Ruffner – guitar
- Malcolm Burn – bass
- Willie Green – drums
- Cyril Neville – percussion

== Critical reception ==
Like Paul Williams, Tony Attwood discusses the song as personal to Dylan but in the sense that it uses "the uncertainty of an artist who has to some degree lost his way, as a theme in his writing". Attwood sees this as part of a larger, successful strategy on Dylan's part "to get his creativity working again" through the "darker times" of the late 1980s when he was writing the songs for Oh Mercy.

In their book Bob Dylan All the Songs: The Story Behind Every Track, authors Philippe Margotin and Jean-Michel Guesdon positively appraise the song as "penetrating and hypnotic" and note that it possesses a "throbbing groove". AllMusic rated the song 3-and-a-half out of five stars.

In her book A Freewheelin' Time: A Memoir of Greenwich Village in the Sixties, Suze Rotolo cites it as one of her favorite Dylan songs. She writes that she considers it to be "the essence of Bob Dylan", and notes that "only he could have written it" and that it "showcases his acerbic wit and his ability to twist multiple meanings around his finger".

== Live performances ==
According to his official website, Dylan performed the song only 22 times in concert on the Never Ending Tour between 1990 and 1995. The live debut occurred at Toad's Place in New Haven, Connecticut on January 12, 1990, the longest show of Dylan's career, and the last performance (to date) took place at the Edinburgh Playhouse in Edinburgh, Scotland on April 6, 1995.

=== Shadow Kingdom ===
Dylan performed the song in his 2021 concert film Shadow Kingdom: The Early Songs of Bob Dylan. Kitty Empire, writing in The Guardian, cited Dylan's "poignant drawl" on this performance as the high point of the show. Consequence's Katie Moulton likewise considered "What Was It You Wanted" as a "major highlight" of Shadow Kingdom, noting that "[i]n the shifting chiaroscuro, and sung by an octogenarian, the song is simultaneously a plea, an accusation, and a long dark reflection".

This 2021 live version appears on the film’s soundtrack album, Shadow Kingdom (2023).

== Cultural references ==
The narrator asks "What was it you wanted / When you were kissing my cheek?" at the end of the second verse. This has been interpreted as a reference to the Biblical Kiss of Judas.

== Notable covers ==
Willie Nelson covered it for his 1993 album Across the Borderline, a performance cited as one of the best ever Dylan covers by a Texas musician. Nelson also performed the song live at Bob Dylan's 30th Anniversary Concert Celebration tribute show in Madison Square Garden in 1992, which was released as a live album and home video on various formats.
