= Series of Dreams =

Single by Bob Dylan

from the album The Bootleg Series Volumes 1–3 (Rare & Unreleased) 1961–1991
- B-side: "Seven Curses"
- Released: April 1991
- Recorded: March 23, 1989; January 1991
- Genre: Rock
- Length: 5:52 (Bootleg Series Volumes 1–3); 6:27 (Bootleg Series Volume 8)
- Label: Columbia
- Songwriter: Bob Dylan
- Producer: Daniel Lanois

Bob Dylan singles chronology
"Unbelievable" (1990)	"Series of Dreams" (1991)	"My Back Pages" (1993)

Audio sample
- "Series of Dreams": file; help

"Series Of Dreams" is a song written and performed by American singer-songwriter Bob Dylan. The original version, produced by Daniel Lanois, was recorded on March 23, 1989 for (but ultimately omitted from) Dylan's 26th album Oh Mercy. This version was later remixed, with overdubs added in January 1991, for inclusion on The Bootleg Series Volumes 1–3 (Rare & Unreleased) 1961–1991. It was also included on the compilation Bob Dylan's Greatest Hits Volume 3 in 1994.

== Recording ==
In his autobiography Chronicles: Volume One, Dylan wrote about the song's recording,

"Although Lanois liked the song, he liked the bridge better, wanted the whole song to be like that. I knew what he meant, but it just couldn't be done. Though I thought about it for a second, thinking that I could probably start with the bridge as the main part and use the main part as the bridge...the idea didn't amount to much and thinking about the song this way wasn't healthy. I felt like it was fine the way it was – didn't want to lose myself in thinking too much about changing it."

During a Sound Opinions interview broadcast on Chicago FM radio, Lanois told Chicago Tribune critic Greg Kot that "Series of Dreams" was his pick for the opening track, but ultimately, the final decision was Dylan's. Music critic Tim Riley would echo these sentiments, writing that "'Series of Dreams' should have been the working title song to Oh Mercy, not a leftover pendant."

== Critical reception ==
"Series of Dreams" placed 81st on a 2015 Rolling Stone list of the "100 Greatest Bob Dylan Songs". An article accompanying the list called it one of the "best songs" recorded for Oh Mercy, noting that it contains "a flow of fragmented images ('In one, the surface was frozen/In another I witnessed a crime') delivered with a striking just-woke-up frankness".

Dylan scholar Jochen Markhorst has called it an "enchanting song" and praised Lanois' elaborate production, especially the multi-rhythm drumming that "makes the song so distinctive. The whole arrangement, but especially the percussion, gives the song the majestic grandeur which is denied by the sober, nuanced lyrics. Oh Mercy with 'Series Of Dreams' would indeed have been an even more beautiful album, Lanois is right".

Spectrum Culture included the song on a list of "Bob Dylan's 20 Best Songs of the '80s". In an article accompanying the list, critic David Harris noted that it "grips the listener from the start with its rollicking and inviting sound, never letting up throughout. The song narrates a succession of nocturnal visions 'Where nothing comes up to the top/ Everything stays down where its wounded'. Dylan tells us of feeling helpless in these dreams, perhaps a progenitor for the work he would later do on Time Out of Mind. Like any good dream, the images here are semi-coherent, semi-hallucinated, but like any good poet, Dylan does his due diligence to make some sort of sense out of it all."

The Big Issue placed it at #32 on a 2021 list of the "80 best Bob Dylan songs - that aren't the greatest hits" and called it "Music with momentum pushed along by producer Daniel Lanois". A 2021 Guardian article included it on a list of "80 Bob Dylan songs everyone should know".

== Music video ==
Dylan released a music video for the song that consisted almost entirely of archival footage from the mid-1960s through the early 1990s but included a couple of new shots of a hooded-sweatshirt wearing Dylan wandering around an urban area. The video, which also included animation and extensive overlaid text, was acclaimed for its creativity and nominated for the Grammy Award for Best Music Video in 1991, but lost to R.E.M.'s "Losing My Religion."

== Other versions ==
An alternate take of the song, recorded at the March 23, 1989 session, was released in 2008 on The Bootleg Series Vol. 8: Tell Tale Signs: Rare and Unreleased 1989–2006
