= Dignity (Bob Dylan song) =

Single by Bob Dylan

from the album Bob Dylan's Greatest Hits Volume 3
- Released: November 15, 1994
- Recorded: March–April 1989 (original recording); 1994 (mixing and overdubbing)
- Genre: Folk rock; rock and roll
- Length: 5:58
- Label: Columbia
- Songwriter: Bob Dylan
- Producer: Brendan O'Brien

"Dignity" is a song by Bob Dylan, first released on Bob Dylan's Greatest Hits Volume 3 on November 15, 1994, and also released as a CD single a month later. It was originally recorded in the spring of 1989 during the Oh Mercy studio sessions, but was not included on the album. It was also later anthologized on Dylan (2007).

== Recording ==
The difficulties recording the song during the Oh Mercy sessions are described by Dylan in his autobiographical Chronicles: Volume One. It was originally recorded with Dylan accompanied by Brian Stoltz and Willie Green. Though they managed to complete a polished performance, producer Daniel Lanois suggested something more ambitious with a Cajun band. Curious to see what Lanois had in mind, Dylan agreed to recut the song. The next evening, a session was held with Rockin' Dopsie and His Cajun Band, but the results were disastrous. The group experimented with different keys and tempos, but according to Dylan, everyone was frustrated with the results.

Dylan still preferred the original version recorded the previous day, but neither he nor Lanois considered it finished. As the session continued into the early morning hours, the group gave up and began playing old standards like "Jambalaya", "Your Cheatin' Heart" and "There Stands the Glass". The next day, they listened to every take of "Dignity" recorded with Dopsie and his band, and all of them were rejected. "Whatever promise Dan had seen in the song was beaten into a bloody mess", Dylan recalled. "Where we had started from, we'd never gotten back to, a fishing expedition gone nowhere. In no take did we ever turn back the clock. We just kept winding it. Every take another ball of confusion." "Dignity" was set aside, never to be revisited for the remainder of the sessions.

== Release ==
The song as released in 1994 was remixed and overdubbed by Brendan O'Brien (who also played organ on the song on MTV Unplugged the same year). Although this particular re-recording is compositionally similar to the 1989 session (despite extended lead guitar interludes between verses and the outro in the 1994 version), the only element retained from the 1989 session was Dylan's lead vocal and piano. A fresh rhythm track (bass guitar and drums, the latter by The Black Crowes drummer Steve Gorman), keyboards, guitars (electric and acoustic), banjo and tambourine were added during the 1994 session for "Dignity".

== Critical reception ==
Spectrum Culture included the song in a list of "Bob Dylan's 20 Best Songs of the 1980s". In an article accompanying the list, critic Kevin Korber noted that the song possesses a "quiet rage" and called it, along with Oh Mercy's "Political World", "Dylan’s most direct condemnation of the culture of crass, careless consumerism that was the ‘80s".

Ultimate Classic Rock critic Matthew Wilkening rated "Dignity" as the 5th best song Dylan recorded between 1992 and 2011.

== Other versions ==
A live version of the song, recorded on November 18, 1994, for MTV, was released as a single on April 11, 1995, and also appears on MTV Unplugged and Live 1961–2000: Thirty-Nine Years of Great Concert Performances. The single also includes the Brendan O'Brien produced studio cut.

A recording of the song from the original March–April 1989 Oh Mercy sessions was issued on Touched by an Angel: The Album in 1998, and subsequently included on the following compilation albums: The Best of Bob Dylan, Vol. 2 (2000); some editions of The Essential Bob Dylan (2000); Dylan (2007); and Side Tracks (2013), part of Bob Dylan: The Complete Album Collection Vol. One.

A piano demo version of the song, recorded early in the Oh Mercy sessions, possibly in February 1989, was included as part of a six-song sampler in promo editions of Dylan's autobiographical Chronicles Vol. 1. This demo version was also released on Dylan's The Bootleg Series Vol. 8: Tell Tale Signs in 2008, along with a previously unreleased version of the song from the original March–April 1989 recording sessions.

A version of the song by Felicia Olusanya (FeliSpeaks) appears in the performances streamed live on Dylan's 80th birthday, 24 May 2021, from the residence of the US Ambassador in Dublin, Ireland. The event was entitled "Dignity: a celebration of Bob Dylan at 80" and was sponsored by Othervoices.ie. FeliSpeaks interweaves her own verses among Dylan's, emphasizing the timelessness of Dylan's call for justice.

== Live performances ==
According to his official website, Dylan played the song 56 times on the Never Ending Tour between 1994 and 2019.

== Notable covers ==
- Joe Cocker for his 1996 album Organic
- Robyn Hitchcock for his 2002 album Robyn Sings
- The Low Anthem for the 2011 album Rare Trax Nr. 72 - Bob Dylan - It Ain't Me, Babe - Die Besten Cover-Versionen Von
- Francesco De Gregori translated it into Italian (as "Dignità") and recorded it for his 2015 album De Gregori canta Bob Dylan - Amore e furto

== Plagiarism suit ==
An ultimately meritless federal plagiarism lawsuit was filed against Bob Dylan and Sony Records in 1995 by James Damiano; among the songs cited in the suit was "Dignity". The suit was dismissed in 1997, with the judge stating "there is no substantial similarity in the structure, instrumentation or melody of the two songs." An appeal was filed by Damiano and was dismissed in 1998.
