= Ring Them Bells (song) =

1989 song by Bob Dylan

Song by Bob Dylan

from the album Oh Mercy
- Released: September 18, 1989
- Recorded: March/April 1989
- Studio: Mobile studio at 1305 Soniat St., New Orleans
- Genre: Folk; gospel; soft rock
- Length: 3:00
- Label: Columbia
- Songwriter: Bob Dylan
- Producer: Daniel Lanois

Oh Mercy track listing
- 10 tracks: 1. "Political World"; 2. "Where Teardrops Fall"; 3. "Everything Is Broken"; 4. "Ring Them Bells"; 5. "Man in the Long Black Coat"; 6. "Most of the Time"; 7. "What Good Am I?"; 8. "Disease of Conceit"; 9. "What Was It You Wanted"; 10. "Shooting Star"

"Ring Them Bells" is a song written and performed by American singer-songwriter Bob Dylan, released in 1989 as the fourth track on his album Oh Mercy. It is a piano-driven, hymn-like ballad that is considered by many to be the best song on Oh Mercy and it is the track from that album that has been covered the most by other artists.

The song has been anthologized on the albums Bob Dylan's Greatest Hits Volume 3 in 1993 and Dylan in 2007. It was produced by Daniel Lanois. It charted at #14 in Denmark.

== Composition and recording ==
In their book Bob Dylan All the Songs: The Story Behind Every Track, authors Philippe Margotin and Jean-Michel Guesdon cite the Gospel of Matthew as Dylan's main source of inspiration in writing the lyrics: "The bells ring to announce the celestial reign of God, who sent his son Jesus Christ to fulfill his divine will on earth and put the 'lost sheep' back on the right track. These bells proclaim the end of humankind".

In his memoir Chronicles: Volume One, Dylan praised Daniel Lanois' role as producer in creating this specific track: "Lanois captured the essence of it on this, put the magic into its heartbeat and pulse. We cut this song exactly the way I found it...two or three takes with me on the piano, Dan on guitar and Malcolm Burn on keyboards". The song is performed in the key of D-flat major.

== Personnel ==
According to the liner notes of the album

- Bob Dylan – vocals, piano
- Daniel Lanois – guitar
- Malcolm Burn – keyboards

== Critical reception ==
An article in The Daily Telegraph about Dylan's "30 greatest songs" ranked "Ring Them Bells" 27th, calling it a "post-apocalyptic gospel prayer" and praising its "stately piano chord progression" and Dylan's lyrics for their "Biblical richness and elegance".

Spectrum Culture included it on a list of "Bob Dylan's 20 Best Songs of the 1980s". In an article accompanying the list, critic Justin Cober-Lake sees it as an example of Dylan "step(ping) deep into spiritual waters, with churches and saints and holy tintinnabulation. Across a sacred piano and plenty of Lanois-produced void, Dylan sings of St. Peter (possibly the person and the basilica) and proclaims the end of time, liberation for the poor, healing for the blind and deaf. In the world of the song, judgment comes to right the world, and Dylan peaceably watches it come in".

In their book Bob Dylan All the Songs: The Story Behind Every Track, authors Philippe Margotin and Jean-Michel Guesdon note that the "dynamic of the arrangement and the keen harmonic sense of the song establish 'Ring Them Bells' as one of the triumphs of this album'".

Bruce Springsteen, in an appearance on The Late Show with Stephen Colbert in 2020, cited it as one of his three favorite Dylan songs (along with "Like a Rolling Stone" and "Visions of Johanna").

Dylan scholar and musicologist Eyolf Ostrem considers it to be one of Dylan's most complex songs ever from a musical perspective (along with 1967's "Dear Landlord", 1980's "In the Garden" and 2020's "Black Rider").

A USA Today article ranking "all of Bob Dylan's songs" placed "Ring Them Bells" 86th (out of 359). A 2021 Guardian article included it on a list of "80 Bob Dylan songs everyone should know".

== In popular culture ==
The song plays at the end of the 1999 HBO film The Jack Bull. It is also prominently featured in Larry Clark's 2014 film The Smell of Us.

== Other versions ==
The Bootleg Series Vol. 8: Tell Tale Signs: Rare and Unreleased 1989–2006 contains two different versions of the song: an alternate version recorded during the Oh Mercy sessions and a live full-band acoustic version from Dylan's residency at the Supper Club in New York City on November 17, 1993.

Dylan performed the song with the Tokyo Philharmonic Orchestra in Nara, Japan as part of a UNESCO-backed concert titled The Great Music Experience in 1994. It was the first time Dylan had ever played with an orchestra, which was conducted by Michael Kamen. The concert was broadcast on television in 50 countries and earned Dylan rave reviews.

== Live performances ==
Between 1989 and 2005 Dylan performed the song 34 times in concert on the Never Ending Tour. A live performance from E. Rutherford, New Jersey on November 13, 1999 was made available to stream on Dylan's official website in March 2000. A live version from the Supper Club in New York City (the early show on November 16, 1993), a different performance from the one included on The Bootleg Series Vol. 8, was made available to stream on Dylan's official website in September 2001. The live debut occurred at Mid-Hudson Arena in Poughkeepsie, New York on October 20, 1989 and the last performance (to date) took place at Messehalle in Erfurt, Germany on November 6, 2005.

== Notable covers ==
There have been dozens of covers of "Ring Them Bells". Among them:

- Joan Baez with Mary Black on Ring Them Bells, a live album that takes its name from the song
- Jill Sobule with Cyndi Lauper live in 2006.
- Sufjan Stevens on the 2007 I'm Not There movie soundtrack.
- The Mallett Brothers Band with David Mallet, Jon Fishman, live in 2020 in Portland, Maine on the album Live at The State Theater.
- Heart with Layne Staley on their 1993 album Desire Walks On.
- Sarah Jarosz on her 2011 album Follow Me Down.
- Natasha Bedingfield on the 2012 compilation Chimes of Freedom.
- Gordon Lightfoot on his 1993 album Waiting for You.
