= Masked and Anonymous =

- Theatrical release poster
- Directed by: Larry Charles
- Written by: Bob Dylan (as Sergei Petrov); Larry Charles (as Rene Fontaine)
- Produced by: Jeff Rosen
- Starring: Bob Dylan; Jeff Bridges; John Goodman; Penélope Cruz; Luke Wilson; Jessica Lange
- Cinematography: Rogier Stoffers
- Edited by: Pietro Scalia; Luis Alvarez y Alvarez
- Music by: Bob Dylan
- Production companies: BBC Films; Intermedia Films
- Distributed by: Sony Pictures Classics (North America); BBC Partner Entertainment (United Kingdom)
- Release date: 24 July 2003
- Running time: 107 minutes
- Countries: United States; United Kingdom
- Language: English
- Box office: $546,106

Masked and Anonymous is a 2003 drama film directed by Larry Charles. The film was written by Larry Charles (credited as Sergei Petrov) and Bob Dylan (credited as Rene Fontaine). It stars Dylan alongside a star-heavy cast, including John Goodman, Jeff Bridges, Penélope Cruz, Val Kilmer, Mickey Rourke, Jessica Lange, Luke Wilson, Angela Bassett, Bruce Dern, Cheech Marin, Ed Harris, Chris Penn, Steven Bauer, Giovanni Ribisi, Michael Paul Chan, Christian Slater, and Fred Ward.

== Plot ==
An iconic rock legend, Jack Fate (Dylan), is bailed out of prison to perform a one-man benefit concert for a decaying future North American society. The film touches on many subjects, from the futility of politics to the confusion of loosely strung government conspiracies, to the chaos created by both anarchy and Nineteen Eighty-Four-styled totalitarianism. It further reflects on life, dreams, and God's place in a seemingly increasingly chaotic world.

Fate makes it clear that he "was always a singer and maybe no more than that". He produces no solutions to any of the problems the film presents. Rather, he clarifies that he "stopped trying to figure everything out a long time ago".

== Cast ==
- Bob Dylan as Jack Fate
- Jeff Bridges as Tom Friend
- Penélope Cruz as Pagan Lace
- John Goodman as Uncle Sweetheart
- Jessica Lange as Nina Veronica
- Luke Wilson as Bobby Cupid
- Angela Bassett as mistress
- Steven Bauer as Edgar
- Michael Paul Chan as guard
- Bruce Dern as editor
- Ed Harris as Oscar Vogel
- Val Kilmer as animal wrangler
- Cheech Marin as Prospero
- Chris Penn as crew guy #2
- Giovanni Ribisi as soldier
- Mickey Rourke as Edmund
- Richard C. Sarafian as President
- Christian Slater as crew guy #1
- Susan Tyrrell as Ella the fortune teller
- Fred Ward as drunk
- Robert Wisdom as Lucius

== Pre-production ==
In the late 1990s, Dylan was allegedly inspired by the films of Jerry Lewis and decided he wanted to write and star in a slapstick television show for the HBO network. Larry Charles, who had written and produced for Seinfeld and Mad About You, was brought in to meet with the musician regarding the project at Dylan's boxing gym in Santa Monica.

Charles said that during their initial meeting, a chain-smoking Dylan brought "out this very ornate beautiful box, like a sorcerer would, and he opens the box and dumps all these pieces of scrap paper on the table...every piece of scrap paper was a hotel stationery, little scraps from Norway and from Belgium and Brazil and places like that, and each little piece of paper had a line like some kind of little line scribbled or a name scribbled, 'Uncle Sweetheart,' or a weird poetic line or an idea or whatever, and he was like 'I don't know what to do with all this'. And for some reason I was able to go 'oh y'know you can take this...this is a line, this is the character, and the character could say this line". Dylan's scraps of paper served as the inspiration for much of the project's story and script.

A meeting was arranged with HBO executives and the television project was given the green light. However, upon leaving the meeting, Dylan told Charles, "I don't want to do it anymore, it's too slapsticky". Charles decided to stay on as co-writer and director, with the concept of the project eventually evolving from a slapstick television show into the dramatic film Masked and Anonymous. Speaking about his intentions while creating the film, Charles later said, "I wanted to make a Bob Dylan movie that was like a Bob Dylan song. One with a lot of layers, that had a lot of poetry, that had a lot of surrealism and was ambiguous and hard to figure out, like a puzzle".

== Production ==
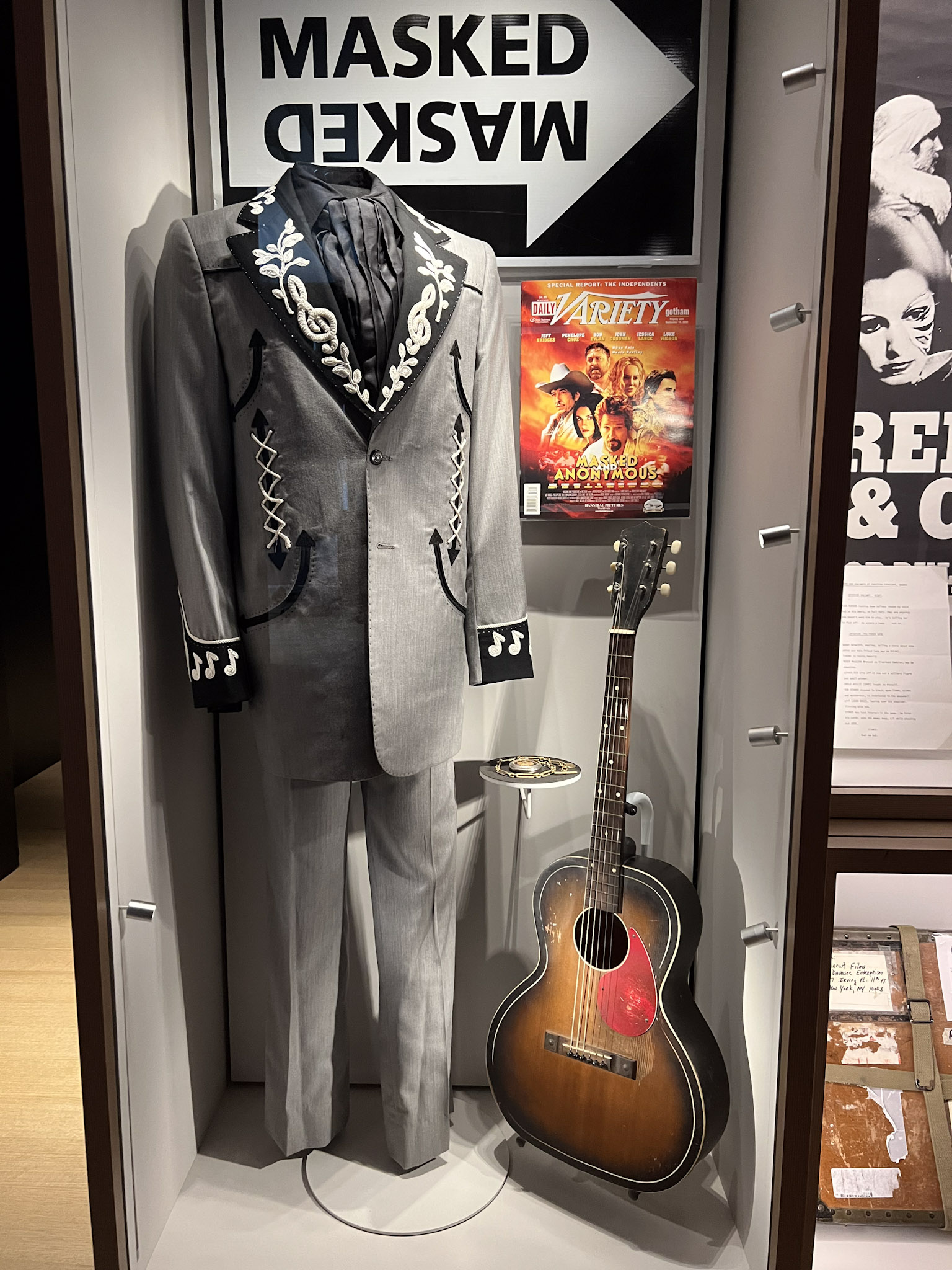
Bob Dylan's costume, guitar and promotional Variety magazine from Masked and Anonymous, on display at the Bob Dylan Center in Tulsa, Oklahoma.

The film was shot in twenty days and was funded by the BBC, who also distributed the film in the United Kingdom. It was distributed by Sony Pictures Classics in the United States, a well-known distributor of independent productions. The soundtrack is composed almost entirely of covers of Bob Dylan songs ranging from his very early 1960s-era material to work as recent as songs from his 1997 Grammy-award-winning album Time Out of Mind. Artists who perform the songs include Los Lobos, Sertab Erener, Grateful Dead and Jerry Garcia.

Many of the film's actors worked for "scale" (union wages) for a chance to appear alongside Dylan, including Jeff Bridges, John Goodman (reunited after their work together in the 1998 Coen Brothers film The Big Lebowski, which also featured the 1970 Dylan song "The Man in Me"), Bruce Dern, Jessica Lange, Penélope Cruz, Luke Wilson, Cheech Marin, Ed Harris, Chris Penn, Giovanni Ribisi, Christian Slater, Mickey Rourke, and Angela Bassett. In addition to several other actors of note, the band of the lead character (which is called "Simple Twist of Fate", taken from the song of the same title from Dylan's album Blood on the Tracks) is played by Dylan's actual touring band of the time. Other stars in the film include Fred Ward and Val Kilmer.

Jessica Lange was the long-term partner of playwright Sam Shepard, who at Dylan's invitation had written a diary of his 1975 Rolling Thunder Revue tour, Rolling Thunder Logbook. Shepard also co-wrote Dylan's 1986 song "Brownsville Girl" from the album Knocked Out Loaded.

Music from Dylan's entire career is presented in the movie, though his then-recent album Time Out Of Mind receives considerable play, with "Dirt Road Blues" and "Not Dark Yet" both used as background in scenes; Dylan also plays a new arrangement of "Cold Irons Bound" in the film's climax. Furthermore, a live performance of "Standing in the Doorway" was cut from the final edit, but included as a bonus on the DVD.

== Reception ==
Masked and Anonymous was given poor reviews upon release. On review aggregator website Rotten Tomatoes, the film holds an approval rating of 26%, based on 82 reviews, and an average rating of 4.03/10. The website's critical consensus reads, "Unintelligible and self-indulgent Bob Dylan vehicle". On Metacritic, the film has a weighted average score of 32 out of 100, based on 28 critics, indicating "generally unfavorable reviews".

Chicago Sun-Times critic Roger Ebert gave the film a 1/2 star (out of a possible four) rating, and deemed it "a vanity production beyond all reason". A number of reviewers commented on Dylan's acting, writing that he appeared "near-catatonic" and that he stared "in mute incomprehension", "never speaking more than one line at a time" and only making remarks that "evoke the language and philosophy of Chinese fortune cookies". The film was also panned by Rolling Stone, Entertainment Weekly, The Village Voice and at least twenty other noteworthy periodicals.

Amongst the positive reviewers was The Washington Post, stating that the film is a "fascinating, vexing, indulgent, visionary, pretentious, mesmerizing pop culture curio".

Andrew Motion, former Poet Laureate of Great Britain, published an enthusiastic essay about the film which concluded: "[This film] is revelatory – in the paradoxical sense that it allows Dylan to say some important things out loud, and to keep the silences, and retain the elements of mystery, which are essential to his genius. We should ask for nothing else".

Jonathan Rosenbaum rated the film a "Must See" in the Chicago Reader then included it on his ten-best list for the year 2003. The film also received positive reviews from Stephanie Zacharek at Salon and Ben Greenman in The New Yorker. Glenn Kenny, who gave the film a negative review upon its initial release, reappraised it for the occasion of the Blu-ray release in 2020, rating it an "A−" and apologizing in his capsule review to director Larry Charles.

Dylan was nominated for a Grammy Award for Best Male Rock Vocal Performance for his new rendition of "Down in the Flood" on the film's soundtrack.

== Unreleased recordings ==
From 1999 to 2002, Dylan's touring band was joined by veteran guitarist Charlie Sexton. Already an accomplished unit, the band's new configuration was acclaimed as one of Dylan's best touring groups ever. Highlighted by the interplay of Sexton and guitarist Larry Campbell, the group also featured Dylan's longtime bassist Tony Garnier, as well as two drummers: David Kemper (who left the band in late 2001) and George Receli (who was Kemper's replacement). Dylan began filming Masked and Anonymous soon after Receli's arrival.

Masked and Anonymous marked the first (and besides one song on The Bootleg Series Vol. 8, only) release of "live" material from this unit. According to director Larry Charles, who recorded an interview for the film's DVD release, 20 or more songs were recorded for the film, with Charles telling Dylan he could play anything he wanted. For the most part, the songs were recorded at Stage 6, Ray-Art Studios, Canoga Park, California, on July 18, 2002. Though all were presumably filmed, only a handful were used. The following songs were featured in the film, with unedited versions included in the soundtrack release: "Down in the Flood" (a song from The Basement Tapes), "Dixie" (traditional), "Diamond Joe" (traditional), and "Cold Irons Bound" (a song from Time Out Of Mind).

The following songs were used for the film, but were never issued on CD: "Drifter's Escape" (a song from John Wesley Harding), "I'll Remember You" (a song from Empire Burlesque), "Blowin' in the Wind" (from The Freewheelin' Bob Dylan), "Watching the River Flow" (a song dating from 1971, when it was released as a single), "Dirt Road Blues" (from Time Out Of Mind) and "Amazing Grace" (traditional). Of these songs, only "I'll Remember You" was featured unedited and uninterrupted in the film.

As mentioned, "Standing in the Doorway" (another song from Time Out of Mind) was featured as an alternate scene on the DVD. "Knockin' on Heaven's Door" (a song Dylan first recorded for Pat Garrett and Billy The Kid) was also filmed, but only a brief portion appears in the DVD's supplemental material. A new 'fiddle' arrangement of "If You See Her, Say Hello" (from Blood on the Tracks) was also filmed, but it only appears as background music during the DVD's supplemental material. Larry Charles mentions "All Along the Watchtower" (a song from John Wesley Harding) during his interview on the DVD – saying Dylan intended to play it until the last moment, then decided not to.

As mentioned, a new recording of "Blowin' in the Wind" was used for the film. This is heard over the film's final shots and end credits. Unlike the other performances used in the film, this was a concert performance recorded at Santa Cruz Civic Auditorium, Santa Cruz, California, on March 16, 2000 (when David Kemper was still with the band). This performance was previously found on the limited edition bonus CD single given away with The Best of Bob Dylan Vol. 2 in the United Kingdom, and it was also featured on a promo CD single Live & Rare 2. Approximately 45 seconds of the harmonica solo was cut for the film while the previous CD releases feature the performance unedited.

== Soundtrack ==
No.	Title	Artist	Length
1.	"My Back Pages"	Magokoro Brothers	4:01
2.	"Gotta Serve Somebody"	Shirley Caesar	5:50
3.	"Down in the Flood" (live)	Bob Dylan	3:36
4.	"It's All Over Now, Baby Blue"	Grateful Dead	7:26
5.	"Most of the Time"	Sophie Zelmani	5:30
6.	"On A Night Like This"	Los Lobos	3:11
7.	"Diamond Joe" (live)	Bob Dylan	2:32
8.	"Come Una Pietra Scalciata (Like a Rolling Stone)"	Articolo 31	4:12
9.	"One More Cup of Coffee"	Sertab	3:52
10.	"Non Dirle Che Non E' Cosi' (If You See Her, Say Hello)"	Francesco De Gregori	4:53
11.	"Dixie" (live)	Bob Dylan	2:12
12.	"Senor (Tales of Yankee Power)"	Jerry Garcia	7:50
13.	"Cold Irons Bound" (live)	Bob Dylan	5:43
14.	"City of Gold"	The Dixie Hummingbirds	5:35

== See also ==
- List of songs written by Bob Dylan
- List of artists who have covered Bob Dylan songs
