= Political World =

1989 song by Bob Dylan

- Cover of the Dutch promotional single.

Single by Bob Dylan

from the album Oh Mercy
- B-side: "Ring Them Bells"
- Released: January 29, 1990
- Recorded: March 8, 1989 (original), April 3, 1989 (album version)
- Studio: Mobile studio at 1305 Soniat St., New Orleans
- Genre: Folk rock
- Length: 3:43
- Label: Columbia
- Songwriter: Bob Dylan
- Producer: Daniel Lanois

Bob Dylan singles chronology
"Everything Is Broken" (1989)	"Political World" (1990)	"Most of the Time" (1990)

Oh Mercy track listing
- 10 tracks: 1. "Political World"; 2. "Where Teardrops Fall"; 3. "Everything Is Broken"; 4. "Ring Them Bells"; 5. "Man in the Long Black Coat"; 6. "Most of the Time"; 7. "What Good Am I?"; 8. "Disease of Conceit"; 9. "What Was It You Wanted"; 10. "Shooting Star"

"Political World" is an uptempo folk rock song written and recorded by American singer-songwriter Bob Dylan, released as the opening track on his 1989 album Oh Mercy and as a single in Europe in 1990. It was produced by Daniel Lanois.

== Composition and recording ==
Dylan describes writing the lyrics of "Political World" in his Malibu home in the "Oh Mercy" chapter of his memoir Chronicles: Volume One: "One night when everyone was asleep and I was sitting at the kitchen table, nothing on the hillside but a shiny bed of lights - all that changed. I wrote about twenty verses for a song called 'Political World' and this was about the first of twenty songs I would write in the next month or so...With the song I thought I might have broken through to something. It was like you wake up from a deep and drugged slumber and somebody strikes a little silver gong and you come to your senses". Dylan also notes that he wrote approximately twice as many verses as he recorded and includes an example of one of the discarded verses in the book.

In their book Bob Dylan All the Songs: The Story Behind Every Track, authors Philippe Margotin and Jean-Michel Guesdon note how Daniel Lanois's atmospheric production plunges listeners "into a dreamy, heavy, menacing but definitely original vibe. The fade-in subtly introduces the drum part, supported by an excellent bassline by Tony Hall. He puts an irresistible pulse to the piece on his four string. Dylan has finally found his producer".

== Personnel ==
According to the liner notes of the album

- Bob Dylan – vocals, guitar
- Mason Ruffner – guitar
- Brian Stoltz – guitar
- Daniel Lanois – dobro
- Tony Hall – bass
- Willie Green – drums
- Cyril Neville – percussion

== Critical reception ==
Simon Reynolds of Melody Maker found "Political World" a "commendable enough effort in the country blues vein". The song reminded him of the "raunchier" works of Dire Straits (like "Money for Nothing"). Reynolds referred to the lyrics as "a little heavy-handed and blunt".

Margotin and Guesdon describe the song as Dylan offering "a pitiless condemnation of the modern world he lives in, governed by politics, where 'love don't have any place', where 'life is in mirrors, death disappears / Up the steps into the nearest bank'. Dylan rails against this world of materialism, which has become the dominant ideology, where 'wisdom is thrown into jail' and 'where courage is a thing of the past', and calls for a return to spirituality. In this regard, 'Political World' appears as an almost logical continuation of 'With God on Our Side', recorded twenty-six years earlier".

Dylan scholar Tony Attwood notes that, although the song consists of only a single chord, it is the music that resonates more than the words: "the extraordinary thing is that for once it is not the lyrics that stay with the listener first, second or third time it is sung. That is not to say the lyrics are not good, but rather that the energy and drive of the song is so great that it is enough. The words come next...From a man who made his name in part from unusual chord changes and less than perfect productions of his songs on record, this is a complete reversal. The music on the album is perfectly performed – as it has to be because it counts for so much. The chord is still just one, there is nothing else, for we have nothing else".

A 2021 Guardian article included it on a list of "80 Bob Dylan songs everyone should know".

== Music video ==
Bob Dylan in a screen capture from the "Political World" music video

Dylan starred in a promotional music video for the song directed by musician John Mellencamp. The video depicts Dylan and band performing the song on a dimly lit stage to a crowd consisting of older male politicians and military brass and their younger female companions. The concertgoers are, incongruously, seated at a long dining table lit only by candles.

== Cultural references ==
The phrase "You climb into the frame" from the final verse is taken from the 1970 song "Love Calls You By Your Name" by Dylan's friend Leonard Cohen.

== Live performances ==
From 1989 to 1991, Dylan played the song 28 times on the Never Ending Tour. The live debut occurred at Toad's Place in New Haven, Connecticut (Dylan's longest-ever show) and the last performance to date took place at Hall 3 in Glasgow, Scotland on February 3, 1991.

== Charts ==
Chart (1989)	Peak position
Italy Airplay (Music & Media)	1

== Notable cover versions ==
- The Carolina Chocolate Drops for the Chimes of Freedom compilation album (2012)
- Francesco De Gregori who translated it into Italian (as "Politico Mondo") for De Gregori canta Bob Dylan - Amore e furto (2015)
- Bettye LaVette featuring Keith Richards for Things Have Changed (2018)
- Lucinda Williams for Bob's Back Pages - A Night of Bob Dylan Songs (2020)
