= Time Out of Mind (Bob Dylan album) =

1997 studio album by Bob Dylan

Studio album by Bob Dylan
- Released: September 30, 1997
- Recorded: 1996–1997
- Studio: Criteria (Miami)
- Genres: Blues rock; country; blues; rockabilly
- Length: 72:50
- Label: Columbia
- Producer: Daniel Lanois

Bob Dylan chronology
The Best of Bob Dylan (1997)	Time Out of Mind (1997)	The Bootleg Series Vol. 4: Bob Dylan Live 1966, The "Royal Albert Hall" Concert (1998)

Bob Dylan studio album chronology
World Gone Wrong (1993)	Time Out of Mind (1997)	"Love and Theft" (2001)

Singles from Time Out of Mind
- 1. "Not Dark Yet" Released: August 25, 1997; 2. "Love Sick" Released: June 18, 1998

Time Out of Mind is the thirtieth studio album by American singer-songwriter Bob Dylan, released on September 30, 1997, through Columbia Records. It was released as a single CD as well as a double studio album on vinyl, his first since The Basement Tapes in 1975.

For many fans and critics, the album marked Dylan's artistic comeback after he appeared to struggle with his musical identity throughout the 1980s; he had not released any original material since the poorly received Under the Red Sky in 1990. Time Out of Mind is one of Dylan's most acclaimed albums, and it went on to win three Grammy Awards, including Album of the Year in 1998. It was also ranked number 410 on Rolling Stone's 500 Greatest Albums of All Time in 2012.

The album has an atmospheric sound, the work of producer (and past Dylan collaborator) Daniel Lanois, whose innovative work with carefully placed microphones and strategic mixing was detailed by Dylan in his memoir, Chronicles: Volume One. Although Dylan has spoken positively of Lanois' production style, he expressed dissatisfaction with the sound of Time Out of Mind. Dylan has self-produced his subsequent albums.

== Background and writing ==
In April 1991, Dylan told interviewer Paul Zollo that "there was a time when the songs would come three or four at the same time, but those days are long gone...Once in a while, the odd song will come to me like a bulldog at the garden gate and demand to be written. But most of them are rejected out of my mind right away. You get caught up in wondering if anyone really needs to hear it. Maybe a person gets to the point where they have written enough songs. Let someone else write them".

Dylan's last album of original material had been 1990's Under the Red Sky, a critical and commercial disappointment. Since then, he had released two albums of folk covers, Good as I Been to You and World Gone Wrong, and MTV Unplugged, a live album of older compositions; there had been no signs of any fresh compositions until 1996.

Dylan began to write a fresh string of songs during the winter of 1996 at his farm in Minnesota, which would later make up Time Out of Mind. Criteria Studio in Miami, Florida was booked for recording. In a televised interview with Charlie Rose, Lanois recalled Dylan talking about spending many late nights working on the lyrics. Once the words were completed, according to Lanois, Dylan considered the record to be finished saying, "You know, whatever we decide to do with it, that's that." Lanois replied: "What's important is that it's written".

== Recording sessions ==
When Bob read me the lyrics of this record we were at a hotel room here in New York City. The words were hard, were deep, were desperate, were strong.... That's the record I wanted to make.

— Daniel Lanois

Dylan demoed some of the songs in the studio, something he rarely did. Members of Dylan's touring band were involved in these sessions. Dylan also used these loose, informal sessions to experiment with new ideas and arrangements. Dylan continued rewriting lyrics until January 1997, when the official album sessions began. It was the second collaboration between Dylan and Lanois, who had previously produced Dylan's 1989 release Oh Mercy and was known for his work with artists such as Emmylou Harris (on Wrecking Ball) and U2 (on The Joshua Tree and Achtung Baby). Dylan wanted the sound of Time Out of Mind to be influenced by early blues musicians, such as Charley Patton, Little Walter, and Little Willie John, and he recommended that Lanois listen to their recordings to prepare for the sessions.

New personnel hired for the album included slide guitarist Cindy Cashdollar and drummer Brian Blade, both hired by Lanois. Dylan brought in Jim Keltner, who was Dylan's tour drummer from 1979 to 1981. Dylan also hired Nashville guitarist Bob Britt, Duke Robillard, Tex-Mex organist Augie Meyers, and Memphis pianist Jim Dickinson to play at the sessions.

According to Lanois, Dylan likes old 1950s records since "they had a natural depth of field which was not the result of a mixing technique". He used a Sony C37A microphone, which was also used to record Dylan's album Oh Mercy. Various other devices were used to produce the album's distinctive sound. Lanois also devised a method to accommodate new or revised lyrics later in an original take, since this was often the case with Dylan.

With two different sets of players competing in performance and two producers with conflicting views on how to approach each song, the sessions were far from disciplined. Years later, when asked about Time Out of Mind, Dickinson replied, "I haven't been able to tell what's actually happening. I know they were listening to playbacks, I don't know whether they were trying to mix it or not! Twelve musicians playing live—three sets of drums,... it was unbelievable—two pedal steels, I've never even heard two pedal steels played at the same time before! ... I don't know man, I thought that much was overdoing it, quite frankly".

Lanois admitted some difficulty in producing Dylan. "Well, you just never know what you're going to get. He's an eccentric man..." In a later interview, Lanois said Dylan and he used to go to the parking lot to discuss the recording in absence of the band. Lanois elaborated their discussion on the song "Standing in the Doorway". "I said 'listen, I love "Sad Eyed Lady of the Lowlands". Can we steal that feel for this song?' And he'd say 'you think that'd work?' Then we'd sit on the fender of a truck, in this parking lot in Miami, and I'd often think, if people see this they won't believe it!" With Time Out of Mind, Lanois "produced perhaps the most artificial-sounding album in [Dylan]'s canon," says author Clinton Heylin, who described the album as sounding "like a Lanois CV".

I just wanted to say, one time when I was about sixteen or seventeen years old, I went to see Buddy Holly play at the Duluth National Guard Armory...I was three feet away from him...and he looked at me. And I just have some sort of feeling that he was—I don't know how or why—but I know he was with us all the time we were making this record in some kind of way.

— Bob Dylan

Dylan talked about his difficulty at the recording sessions in an interview with Guitar World magazine. "I lose my inspiration in the studio real easy, and it's very difficult for me to think that I'm going to eclipse anything I've ever done before. I get bored easily, and my mission, which starts out wide, becomes very dim after a few failed takes and this and that." In the same interview Dylan cited Buddy Holly as an influence during the recording sessions.

In relation to past works like Highway 61 Revisited, Blood on the Tracks, and Infidels, Dylan said:

Those records were made a long time ago, and you know, truthfully, records that were made in that day and age all were good. They all had some magic to them because the technology didn't go beyond what the artist was doing. It was a lot easier to get excellence back in those days on a record than it is now.....The high priority is technology now. It's not the artist or the art. It's the technology that is coming through. That's what makes Time Out of Mind... it doesn't take itself seriously, but then again, the sound is very significant to that record. If that record was made more haphazardly, it wouldn't have sounded that way. It wouldn't have had the impact that it did.... There wasn't any wasted effort on Time Out of Mind and I don't think there will be on any more of my records.

— Bob Dylan in Guitar World (1999)

The album's cover art is a blurry photo of Dylan in the recording studio, taken by Lanois.

== Songs ==
"Love Sick"

The first track on this album is the sparsely recorded "Love Sick", which was subsequently also released as a single. Daniel Lanois later said about the recording process of this song, "We treated the voice almost like a harmonica when you over-drive it through a small guitar amplifier". Pitchfork's Grayson Haver Callin wrote that the song shows Dylan as he "shuffles through empty streets in the rain, a tangle of warped guitar, haunted organs, and faint drums aptly framing his bleak mood". Dylan performed "Love Sick" live at the 1998 Grammy Awards ceremony.

"Dirt Road Blues"

"Dirt Road Blues" was improvised from a country-blues riff of indeterminate origin. Lanois recalls, "He made me pull out the original cassette, sample sixteen bars and we all played over that [for the released version],..." Some critics criticized the performance for being 'mediocre' and for destroying the mood that was set up by the opening track. Michael Gray writes, "'Dirt Road Blues', which might under normal production circumstances be a heartening, even dexterous little rockabilly number, puts Dylan so far away and so tiny you just despair".

"Love Sick"
"Love Sick" is the opening track of Time Out Of Mind

"Not Dark Yet"
"Not Dark Yet", "the most celebrated song" on Time Out Of Mind

"Cold Irons Bound"
"Cold Irons Bound", the Grammy-winning song by Bob Dylan

"Standing in the Doorway"

"Million Miles"

"Million Miles" has a 1950s blues and rock and roll atmosphere. Critics have noted that the song nods to Little Willie John, Elvis Presley, and B.B. King.

"Tryin' to Get to Heaven"

"'Til I Fell in Love with You"

In "'Til I Fell in Love with You", Dylan scholar Jochen Markhurst points to echoes of Ma Rainey's "South Bound Blues', as well as the influence of Slim Harpo. The Time out of Mind outtake "Marchin' to the City" can be considered an earlier version of this song; in any case the songs share a few lyric lines.

"Not Dark Yet"

"Not Dark Yet", the first of two singles from the album, was described by Time magazine as 'the moody album's center' and was included in its Ten Best Bob Dylan Songs article of 2011. The song explores the singer's own existential crises. "Not Dark Yet" was recorded at the early recording sessions and featured "a radically different feel", according to Lanois. "[The demo of 'Not Dark Yet'] was quicker and more stripped-down and [later during the formal studio sessions], he changed it into a civil war ballad".

The song is analyzed by Professor Christopher Ricks in his book Dylan's Visions of Sin. Ricks draws parallels between "Not Dark Yet" and John Keats's poem Ode to a Nightingale. Both works are musings on mortality, and Ricks argues that "similar turns of phrase, figures of speech, [and] felicities of rhyming" can be found throughout "Not Dark Yet" and the Ode: "The memories of Ode to a Nightingale in 'Not Dark Yet' come from throughout the Ode, diffusedly there." A promotional video of this song was released.

"Cold Irons Bound"

The next song, "Cold Irons Bound", won the 1998 Grammy for best male rock vocal performance. Oliver Trager describes the track as "biting" with "ricocheting guitar licks, rockabilly drums, distorted organ, and [a] voice floating in a blimp of its own echo," in which "one can still hear, to paraphrase 'Visions of Johanna', the ghost of electricity howling from the bones of Dylan's face..." Michael Gray also describes this song in detail:

There's an interesting tension, too, in "Cold Irons Bound", perhaps more accurately an interesting inappropriateness between, on one side, the grinding electronic blizzard of the music and the cold, aircraft-hangar echo of the voice lamenting its sojourn across a lethal planet—fields turned brown, sky lowering with clouds of blood, winds that can tear you to shreds, mists like quicksand—and on the other side the recurrently stated pursuit of tenderness, in phrases that seem imported from another consciousness.

"Make You Feel My Love"

The song "Make You Feel My Love" was recorded twice under the title "To Make You Feel My Love" by other artists: Billy Joel recorded the song for his Greatest Hits Volume III collection before Dylan released the song; subsequently, Garth Brooks recorded it for the Hope Floats soundtrack. It was recorded under the original title by Bryan Ferry on Dylanesque and by Adele on 19. This song was criticized for its lyrical inferiority by The Village Voice's Robert Christgau and Greg Kot of Rolling Stone. In his review, Kot described the track as "a spare ballad undermined by greetingcard lyrics [that] breaks the album's spell". Opposing his view, Dylan critic Paul Williams said that it was "refreshing" to his ears. He said: "...the ultimate effect is to strengthen the spell the whole record casts—this musical and verbal break is exactly in place".

"Can't Wait"

The penultimate track of the album is "Can't Wait". Greg Kot wrote, "On Time Out of Mind, [Dylan] paints a self-portrait with words and sound that pivots around a single line from the album's penultimate song, 'Can't Wait': "That's how it is when things disintegrate"". An alternate version of this song is included on the album The Bootleg Series Vol. 8 – Tell Tale Signs: Rare and Unreleased 1989–2006. (Deluxe Editions of this album contain two alternate versions of the song.)

"Highlands"

The closing track, at time of release the longest composition ever released by Dylan, the 16-minute "Highlands", most probably took its central motif ("My heart's in the highlands") from a poem by Robert Burns called "My heart's in the highlands" (published in 1790). In Jim Dickinson's account, "I remember, when we finished 'Highlands'—there are two other versions of that, the one that made the record is the rundown, literally, you can hear the beat turn over, which I think Dylan liked. But, anyway, after we finished it, one of the managers came out, and he said, "Well, Bob, have you got a short version of that song?" And Dylan looked at him and said: 'That was the short version'".

The song describes a story of the narrator and his interactions with a waitress of a restaurant in Boston Town. Dylan mentions Neil Young and Erica Jong in this song. Keith Phipps of The A.V. Club wrote: "The material here is generally slow and meditative, lending the work a consistent tone appropriately capped by the 16-minute 'Highlands', a 'Desolation Row'-style experiment with an extended song form; it's further proof that the singer/songwriter is far from coasting".

== Outtakes ==
Fifteen songs were recorded for Time Out of Mind, of which eleven made the final cut.

The first song that did not make the album was "Mississippi", which was re-recorded for Love and Theft. According to Dylan, "If you had heard the original recording of ['Mississippi'], you'd see in a second" why it was omitted and recut for Love and Theft. "The song was pretty much laid out intact melodically, lyrically and structurally, but Lanois didn't see it. Thought it was pedestrian. Took it down the Afro-polyrhythm route—multirhythm drumming, that sort of thing. Polyrhythm has its place, but it doesn't work for knife-like lyrics trying to convey majesty and heroism". Dylan offered the song to Sheryl Crow, who recorded it for The Globe Sessions, released in 1998, before Dylan revisited it for Love and Theft. Three outtakes of "Mississippi" from the Time Out Of Mind sessions were included on The Bootleg Series Vol. 8 – Tell Tale Signs: Rare and Unreleased 1989–2006 (two versions on the generally released discs and one on a bonus disc included with the Deluxe Edition of the album).

A second outtake, "Dreamin' of You"', also released on Tell Tale Signs, was unveiled for the first time as a free download on Dylan's website. Its lyrics were partly adapted into "Standing in the Doorway", though the melody and music are completely different. The music video, which starred Harry Dean Stanton, premiered on Amazon.com.

Two more songs, "Red River Shore" (which according to Jim Dickinson was "the best song there was from the session") and "Marchin' to the City" (which evolved into "'Til I Fell in Love with You"), were left off the final cut. They were both included on Tell Tale Signs.

Over the years, some fans have criticized Dylan for some of the creative decisions made with his albums, particularly with song selection. Time Out of Mind was no different except this time the criticism came from colleagues who were disappointed to see their personal favorites left on the shelf. When Dylan accepted the Grammy Award for Album of the Year, he mentioned Columbia Records chairman Don Ienner, who "convinced me to put [the album] out, although his favorite songs aren't on it".

== Reception ==
=== Commercial reception ===
Time Out of Mind was a commercial success for Dylan. It was widely hailed as Dylan's comeback album and U.S. sales soon passed platinum and stayed on best-selling charts for 29 weeks. In UK the sales passed gold. The album, in other countries also, managed to secure positions on best-selling charts and remained there for several weeks. Again the album's highest chart position worldwide was in Norway, where it peaked at No. 2.

=== Critical reception ===
Professional ratings
Review scores
Source	Rating
AllMusic	4/5 stars
Blender	5/5 stars
Entertainment Weekly	A+
The Guardian	4/5 stars
Los Angeles Times	3.5/4 stars
NME	8/10
Pitchfork	9.4/10
Rolling Stone	4/5 stars
Spin	9/10
The Village Voice	A−

Time Out of Mind received mostly positive reviews and began a renaissance of Dylan's career. In a 2018 retrospective for Pitchfork, Grayson Haver Currin wrote that the album "would transform Dylan from seemingly obsolete icon to wise, wizened visionary almost overnight". In his review for The Village Voice, Robert Christgau said, "The hooks are Dylan's spectral vocals—just his latest ventriloquist's trick, a new take on ancient, yet so real, so ordained—and a band whose quietude evokes the sleepy postjunk funk of Clapton's 461 Ocean Boulevard without the nearness of sex". He later regarded it as "one of those nearness-of-death albums", along with Mississippi John Hurt's Last Sessions (1972), Warren Zevon's The Wind (2003), Neil Young's Prairie Wind (2005), and Johnny Cash's American VI: Ain't No Grave (2010).

On the NY Rock website, Cook Young called the songs "superb". He described Time Out of Mind as "a curious album. It's sort of two records mixed together. Half the songs compare to the introspective plaintive compositions that we witnessed on Blood on the Tracks. The other half are 12-bar blues ditties that often sound as if Bob is making 'em up as he goes". "Time Out of Mind is fantastic", said Elvis Costello. "I think it might be the best record he's made".

Some critics criticized Lanois's production for, as Currin wrote, "warping Dylan’s voice too much, for burying it in a cloud of effects". AllMusic senior editor Stephen Thomas Erlewine wrote, "Time Out of Mind has a grittier foundation—by and large, the songs are bitter and resigned, and Dylan gives them appropriately anguished performances. Lanois bathes them in hazy, ominous sounds, which may suit the spirit of the lyrics, but are often in opposition to Dylan's performances". Michael Gray writes, "The sound is elsewhere unhelpful too on Time Out of Mind. Some tracks have Dylan so buried in echo that there is no hope of hearing the detailing in his voice that was once so central and diamondlike a part of his genius".

Alex Ross wrote:

Everything on Time Out of Mind goes under one dreamy, archaic mood. The album manages to skip the twentieth century: trains discourage gambling, people ride in buggies, there's no air-conditioning ("It's too hot to sleep"), church bells ring, "gay" means happy, the time of day is measured by the sun, lamps apparently run on gas (and are turned "down low") and, most of the time, the singer is walking. He is almost ready to stray into the rustic wasteland of Schubert's Winterreise, which opens with the Dylanesque lines "I came here a stranger/ A stranger I depart." The wistfulness is intense....The melancholy could become crushing, but Dylan doesn't let it. The best songs on Time Out of Mind are inexplicably funny; there's a wicked glee in the performance as Dylan manipulates the tatters of his voice, the scatterdness of his inspiration, the paralysis that might arise from his obsession with history, the prevailing image of himself as a mumbling curmudgeon.

== Aftermath and legacy ==
Shortly after completing the album, Dylan became seriously ill with near-fatal histoplasmosis. His forthcoming tour was canceled, and he spent most of June 1997 in excruciating pain. A potentially serious condition (caused by the fungal infection Histoplasma capsulatum), it makes breathing very difficult. "It was something called histoplasmosis that came from just accidentally inhaling a bunch of stuff that was out on one of the rivers by where I live", said Dylan. "Maybe one month, or two to three days out of the year, the banks around the river get all mucky, and then the wind blows and a bunch of swirling mess is in the air. I happened to inhale a bunch of that. That's what made me sick. It went into my heart area, but it wasn't anything really attacking my heart", Dylan told Guitar World magazine.

In light of Dylan's May 1997 health scare, a number of columnists, including Dylanologist A. J. Weberman, speculated that the songs on Time Out of Mind were inspired by an increased awareness of his own mortality. This was despite the fact that all of the songs were completed, recorded, and even mixed before he was hospitalized. In interviews following its release, Dylan dismissed these speculations.

My recollection of that record is that it was a struggle. A struggle every inch of the way. Ask Daniel Lanois, who was trying to produce the songs. Ask anyone involved in it. They all would say the same....As a result, though it held together as a collection of songs, that album sounds to me a little off. There's a sense of some wheels going this way some wheels going that, but hey, we're just about getting there.

— Bob Dylan

Beside being ranked as number 410 on Rolling Stone magazine's list of the 500 greatest albums of all time, in both Pazz & Jop's critics poll and Uncut magazine, Time Out of Mind was voted as album of the year. The album was also included in the book 1001 Albums You Must Hear Before You Die. It was voted number 652 in the third edition of Colin Larkin's All Time Top 1000 Albums (2000).

At least two artists have covered Time Out of Mind in its entirety: guitarist Stephen Michael (recording under the name "Georgia Sam") and Arve-Gunnar Heløy, who not only recorded every track but translated all of the lyrics into Norwegian.

Hip hop group Public Enemy referenced the album's title in their 2007 Dylan tribute song "Long and Whining Road": "From basement tapes, beyond them dollars and cents / Changing of the guards spent, now where the hell the majors went? / Most of their time out of mind, hating my mess-age rhymes".

A 2021 Irish Times article ranking all 39 of Dylan's studio albums placed Time Out of Mind first.

The National's Aaron Dessner has cited it as his favorite Dylan album.

=== 40th Grammy Awards ===
At the 1998 Grammy Awards, Time Out of Mind won in the categories of Album of the Year, Best Contemporary Folk Album and, for "Cold Irons Bound", Best Male Rock Vocal Performance. At the awards ceremony, Dylan performed the song "Love Sick". During the performance, Michael Portnoy, an American multimedia artist and choreographer, ripped off his shirt, ran up next to Dylan, and started dancing and contorting with the words "Soy Bomb" painted in black across his chest. Dylan shot an alarmed glance at Portnoy, but carried on playing. Portnoy continued to dance for about 40 seconds, until another of the background dancers escorted him off stage.

== Track listing ==
All tracks are written by Bob Dylan.

Time Out of Mind track listing
No.	Title	Length
1.	"Love Sick"	5:21
2.	"Dirt Road Blues"	3:36
3.	"Standing in the Doorway"	7:43
4.	"Million Miles"	5:52
5.	"Tryin' to Get to Heaven"	5:21
6.	"'Til I Fell in Love with You"	5:17
7.	"Not Dark Yet"	6:29
8.	"Cold Irons Bound"	7:15
9.	"Make You Feel My Love"	3:32
10.	"Can't Wait"	5:47
11.	"Highlands"	16:31
Total length:		72:50

== Personnel ==
- Bob Dylan – guitar, harmonica, piano, vocals, production

Additional musicians

- Bucky Baxter – acoustic guitar, pedal steel on "Standing in the Doorway", "Tryin' to Get to Heaven", "Not Dark Yet" and "Cold Irons Bound"
- Brian Blade – drums on "Love Sick", "Standing in the Doorway", "Million Miles", "'Til I Fell in Love with You", "Not Dark Yet" and "Can't Wait"
- Robert Britt – Martin acoustic, Fender Stratocaster on "Standing in the Doorway", "'Til I Fell in Love with You", "Not Dark Yet" and "Cold Irons Bound"
- Cindy Cashdollar – slide guitar on "Standing in the Doorway", "Tryin' to Get to Heaven" and "Not Dark Yet"
- Jim Dickinson – keyboards, Wurlitzer electric piano, pump organ on "Love Sick", "Dirt Road Blues", "Million Miles", "Tryin' to Get to Heaven", "Til I Fell in Love with You", "Not Dark Yet", "Can't Wait" and "Highlands"
- Tony Garnier – bass guitar, upright bass
- Jim Keltner – drums on "Love Sick", "Standing in the Doorway", "Million Miles", "Tryin' to Get to Heaven", "'Til I Fell in Love with You", "Not Dark Yet" and "Can't Wait"
- David Kemper – drums on "Cold Irons Bound"
- Daniel Lanois – guitar, mando-guitar, Firebird, Martin 0018, Gretsch gold top, rhythm guitar, lead guitar, production, photography
- Tony Mangurian – percussion on "Standing in the Doorway", "Million Miles", "Can't Wait" and "Highlands"
- Augie Meyers – Vox organ combo, Hammond B3 organ, accordion
- Duke Robillard – guitar, electric Gibson L-5 on "Million Miles", "Tryin' to Get to Heaven" and "Can't Wait"
- Winston Watson – drums on "Dirt Road Blues"

Technical personnel

- Chris Carrol – assistant engineering
- Joe Gastwirt – mastering engineering
- Mark Howard – engineering
- Geoff Gans – art direction
- Susie Q. – photography
- Mark Seliger – photography

== Chart history ==
Chart	Peak position
Australia	24
Austria	12
Belgium	11
Finland	28
France	15
Germany	6
Netherlands	28
New Zealand	11
Norway	2
Spain	36
Sweden	5
Switzerland	20
United Kingdom	10
United States	10

== Certifications ==
Region	Certification	Certified units/sales
Australia (ARIA)	Gold	35,000^{^}
Canada (Music Canada)	Gold	50,000^{^}
New Zealand (RMNZ)	Gold	7,500^{^}
Norway (IFPI Norway)	Gold	25,000^{*}
United Kingdom (BPI)	Gold	100,000^{^}
United States (RIAA)	Platinum	1,000,000^{^}
^{*} Sales figures based on certification alone.^{^} Shipments figures based on certification alone.

== See also ==
- The Bootleg Series Vol. 8 – Tell Tale Signs: Rare and Unreleased 1989–2006 – 2008 compilation featuring demos and outtakes from the album
- The Bootleg Series Vol. 17: Fragments – Time Out of Mind Sessions (1996–1997) – 2023 compilation featuring a remastered version of the studio album, and further demos and outtakes from the album
