= Everything Is Broken =

- Cover of the American promotional single.

Single by Bob Dylan

from the album Oh Mercy
- B-side: "Death Is Not the End"
- Released: October 23, 1989
- Recorded: March 14 or 15, 1989 (original), April 3, 1989 (album version)
- Studio: Mobile studio at 1305 Soniat St., New Orleans
- Genre: Rock; blues; rock and roll; folk rock
- Length: 3:13
- Label: Columbia
- Songwriter: Bob Dylan
- Producer: Daniel Lanois

Bob Dylan singles chronology
"Silvio" (1988)	"Everything Is Broken" (1989)	"Political World" (1990)

Oh Mercy track listing
- 10 tracks: 1. "Political World"; 2. "Where Teardrops Fall"; 3. "Everything Is Broken"; 4. "Ring Them Bells"; 5. "Man in the Long Black Coat"; 6. "Most of the Time"; 7. "What Good Am I?"; 8. "Disease of Conceit"; 9. "What Was It You Wanted"; 10. "Shooting Star"

"Everything is Broken" is an uptempo rock song written and recorded by American singer-songwriter Bob Dylan, and released as the first single from his 1989 album Oh Mercy, where it appears as the third track. It was later anthologized on the compilation albums The Essential Bob Dylan in 2000 and Dylan in 2007. The song spent eight weeks on Billboard's "Mainstream Rock Songs" chart, peaking at number eight on October 27, 1989. Daniel Lanois produced it.

== Composition ==
"Everything is Broken" is a "list song" in which the narrator describes a world where everything seems to be broken. Originally recorded as "Broken Days" in March 1989, Dylan had rewritten the song entirely by April, giving it its current name. In an interview with Nigel Williamson (the author of The Rough Guide to Bob Dylan), Oh Mercy's producer, Daniel Lanois, described how Dylan would rework his songs over and over again:

"I sat next to him for two months while he wrote [Oh Mercy] and it was extraordinary. Bob overwrites. He keeps chipping away at his verses. He has a place for all his favorite couplets, and those couplets can be interchangeable. I've seen the same lyrics show up in two or three different songs as he cuts and pastes them around, so it's not quite as sacred ground as you might think.

== Personnel ==
According to the liner notes of the album

- Bob Dylan – vocals, guitar, harmonica
- Brian Stoltz – guitar
- Daniel Lanois – dobro
- Tony Hall – bass
- Willie Green – drums
- Daryl Johnson – percussion
- Malcolm Burn – tambourine

== Critical reception ==
In their book Bob Dylan All the Songs: The Story Behind Every Track, authors Philippe Margotin and Jean-Michel Guesdon characterize "Everything is Broken" as a "Louisiana, or swamp blues, song" in the vein of Slim Harpo. They describe the recording as "both nonchalant and rhythmic, punctuated by guitars with very pronounced vibrato" and praise Dylan's harmonica solo as "exquisite".

Spectrum Culture included the song on a list of "Bob Dylan's 20 Best Songs of the '80s". In an article accompanying the list, critic John Paul wrote that "it is at its heart a blues designed to resonate with those experiencing any of its broken items and ideas. Like all good and resonant blues lyrics, 'Everything is Broken' is general enough to apply to nearly any feeling of despondency. In this, Dylan is going back to his folk and blues roots three decades into his storied career".

A 2021 Guardian article included it on a list of "80 Bob Dylan songs everyone should know".

NJArts' Jay Lustig noted that, while Dylan's output was "uneven" in the 1980s, Oh Mercy "put a nice cap on it, with a cohesive, atmospheric sound (largely thanks to producer Daniel Lanois, who also plays various instruments on nine out of the 10 songs) and a strong batch of new songs" and cited "Everything is Broken" as his favorite track on the album.

== Live performances ==
From 1989 to 2003, Dylan played the song 285 times on the Never Ending Tour. The live debut occurred at the Beacon Theatre in New York City on October 10, 1989 and the last performance (to date) took place at the North Charleston Coliseum in Charleston, South Carolina on May 6, 2003.

== Other versions ==
One of the original takes, recorded by Dylan in mid-March 1989 in New Orleans, was included on the 2008 compilation album The Bootleg Series Vol. 8: Tell Tale Signs: Rare and Unreleased 1989–2006.

Kenny Wayne Shepherd covered the song on his second album Trouble Is....
