= Dreamin' of You (Bob Dylan song) =

Single by Bob Dylan

from the album The Bootleg Series Vol. 8: Tell Tale Signs
- A-side: "Dreamin' of you"
- B-side: "Down Along the Cove (Live at Bonnaroo 2004)"
- Released: Autumn 2008
- Recorded: January 1997
- Genre: Rock
- Length: 3:34
- Label: Columbia
- Songwriter(s): Bob Dylan
- Producer(s): Daniel Lanois; Jack Frost

Bob Dylan singles chronology
"Most Likely You Go Your Way (And I'll Go Mine)(Mark Ronson Re-Version)" (2007)	"Dreamin' of You" (2008)	"Beyond Here Lies Nothin'" (2009)

"Dreamin' of You" is a song by Bob Dylan recorded in January 1997 during the sessions for Time Out of Mind but not released until 2008. In that year, the song was featured on Dylan's The Bootleg Series Vol. 8 – Tell Tale Signs collection, and released as a single.

A promotional music video, which starred Harry Dean Stanton, premiered on Amazon.

A 7" vinyl single release of the song (in radio edit form) was available as a bonus with advance orders of the deluxe edition of Tell Tale Signs from Dylan's website. This release featured an alternative version of "Ring Them Bells" as the B-side.
