= Bob Dylan's Greatest Hits Volume 3 =

Greatest hits album by Bob Dylan
- Released: November 15, 1994
- Recorded: 1973–1990
- Genre: Rock
- Length: 77:24
- Label: Columbia
- Producers: Gordon Carroll; Don DeVito; Jerry Wexler; Barry Beckett; Chuck Plotkin; Bob Dylan; Mark Knopfler; Daniel Lanois; Don Was; David Was; Brendan O'Brien

Bob Dylan chronology
World Gone Wrong (1993)	Bob Dylan's Greatest Hits Volume 3 (1994)	MTV Unplugged (1995)

Singles from Bob Dylan's Greatest Hits Volume 3
- 1. "Dignity" Released: 1994

Professional ratings
Review scores
Source	Rating
Allmusic	4/5 stars
Robert Christgau	B+
The Encyclopedia of Popular Music	3/5 stars
Rolling Stone	3/5 stars

Bob Dylan's Greatest Hits Volume 3 is a compilation LP album by Bob Dylan, released on Columbia Records on compact disc and cassette tape in 1994, Columbia catalogue number 66783. It peaked at No. 126 on Billboard 200.

== Content ==
It encompasses recordings released between the years 1973 and 1991, the time period since the previous volume of the series, released in 1971. All of Dylan's studio albums from this time span are represented, with the exceptions of: Dylan, compiled by Columbia without Dylan's input; The Basement Tapes, consisting of material predating this time period; Saved; and Empire Burlesque. The track "Groom's Still Waiting at the Altar" was added to later pressings of Shot of Love after initially being released on the flipside of a single. It includes four Top 40 singles and one previously unreleased track, an outtake from the sessions for Oh Mercy, the song "Dignity" with a new backing track overdubbed and produced in the autumn of 1994 by Brendan O'Brien.

Six of its tracks had been released as singles in the United States. "Changing of the Guards" and "Jokerman" did not make the singles chart, while "Knockin' on Heaven's Door" peaked at No. 12, "Tangled Up in Blue" at No. 31, "Hurricane" at No. 33, and "Gotta Serve Somebody" at No. 24. The liner notes provide a more detailed track-by-track personnel listing.

In 2003, this album was released along with the other two Dylan greatest hits sets in one four-disc package, as Greatest Hits Volumes I–III.

== Track listing ==
All tracks are written by Bob Dylan, except where noted.

Bob Dylan's Greatest Hits Volume 3 track listing
No.	Title	Original release	Length
1.	"Tangled Up in Blue"	Blood on the Tracks, 1975	5:42
2.	"Changing of the Guards"	Street-Legal, 1978	6:36
3.	"The Groom's Still Waiting at the Altar"	B-side to "Heart of Mine", 1981	4:03
4.	"Hurricane" (Dylan, Jacques Levy)	Desire, 1976	8:34
5.	"Forever Young"	Planet Waves, 1974	4:58
6.	"Jokerman"	Infidels, 1983	6:16
7.	"Dignity"	previously unreleased	5:58
8.	"Silvio" (Dylan, Robert Hunter)	Down in the Groove, 1988	3:07
9.	"Ring Them Bells"	Oh Mercy, 1989	3:02
10.	"Gotta Serve Somebody"	Slow Train Coming, 1979	5:25
11.	"Series of Dreams"	The Bootleg Series Volumes 1–3 (Rare & Unreleased) 1961–1991, 1991	5:53
12.	"Brownsville Girl" (Dylan, Sam Shepard)	Knocked Out Loaded, 1986	11:04
13.	"Under the Red Sky"	Under the Red Sky, 1990	4:09
14.	"Knockin' on Heaven's Door"	Pat Garrett & Billy the Kid, 1973	2:30
