= The Bootleg Series Vol. 8: Tell Tale Signs: Rare and Unreleased 1989–2006 =

Compilation album by Bob Dylan
- Released: October 6, 2008
- Recorded: 1989–2006
- Genres: Rock; folk; folk rock; country rock; blues
- Length: 137:07
- Label: Columbia
- Producers: Bob Dylan; Daniel Lanois

Bob Dylan chronology
Dylan (2007)	The Bootleg Series Vol. 8: Tell Tale Signs: Rare and Unreleased 1989–2006 (2008)	Together Through Life (2009)

Bob Dylan Bootleg Series chronology
Vol. 7: No Direction Home: The Soundtrack (2005)	Vol. 8: Tell Tale Signs: Rare and Unreleased 1989–2006 (2008)	Vol. 9: The Witmark Demos: 1962–1964 (2010)

The Bootleg Series Vol. 8: Tell Tale Signs: Rare and Unreleased 1989–2006 is a compilation album by singer-songwriter Bob Dylan released on Legacy Records in 2008. The sixth installment of the ongoing Bob Dylan Bootleg Series, it was originally released as a single disc, a double-disc set, a limited edition triple vinyl album, as well as a three-disc expanded version. This latter edition of Tell Tale Signs includes a detailed 56-page book annotating the recordings by Larry Sloman, a book of photos The Collected Single Sleeves of Bob Dylan drawing on Dylan releases from around the world, plus a 7-inch vinyl single comprising two tracks from the set: "Dreamin' of You" and "Ring Them Bells".

== Background ==
The album spans the recording sessions for Oh Mercy, World Gone Wrong, Time Out of Mind, and Modern Times as well as a number of soundtrack contributions and previously unreleased live tracks from 1989 through 2006. The collection also includes a track from an abandoned album Dylan had started to record with David Bromberg in 1992, and Dylan's duet with Ralph Stanley "The Lonesome River".

Although Under the Red Sky (1990), Good as I Been to You (1992), and "Love and Theft" (2001) were all recorded during this time period, no tracks from these sessions were included on Tell Tale Signs. An alternate version of "Series of Dreams" was included on Vol. 3 of the Bootleg Series. "Dreamin' of You", an outtake from the Time Out of Mind sessions, was offered for free download on Bob Dylan's site and was also sent to radio stations as a promotional single.

In the first week of October 2008, the entire album was made available in a free streaming format on National Public Radio's official website.

== Reception ==
Professional ratings
Aggregate scores
Source	Rating
Metacritic	86/100
Review scores
Source	Rating
AllMusic	4.5/5 stars
The A.V. Club	A−
Entertainment Weekly	A
The Guardian	4/5 stars
Mojo	4/5 stars
Paste	8.8/10
Pitchfork	8.6/10
PopMatters	9/10
Rolling Stone	4.5/5 stars
Uncut	5/5 stars

The album entered the Billboard 200 at number 6, becoming Dylan's 17th album to open in the top 10. It went on to sell over 600,000 copies. Tell Tale Signs currently maintains an 86% positive ("Universal acclaim") rating at Metacritic. It was also named the second best album of 2008 by Rolling Stone magazine.

CBS's announcement that the two-CD set would sell for $18.99 and the three-CD version for $129.99 drew charges of "rip-off pricing" from Dylan critic Michael Gray and other commentators.

== Track listing ==
All tracks are written by Bob Dylan, except where noted.

Disc one
No.	Title	Origin	Length
1.	"Mississippi"	Unreleased, Time Out of Mind	6:04
2.	"Most of the Time"	Alternate version, Oh Mercy	3:46
3.	"Dignity"	Piano demo, Oh Mercy	2:09
4.	"Someday Baby"	Alternate version, Modern Times	5:56
5.	"Red River Shore"	Unreleased, Time Out of Mind	7:36
6.	"Tell Ol' Bill"	Alternate version of song released on the North Country soundtrack	5:31
7.	"Born in Time"	Unreleased, Oh Mercy	4:10
8.	"Can't Wait"	Alternate version, Time Out of Mind	5:45
9.	"Everything Is Broken"	Alternate version, Oh Mercy	3:27
10.	"Dreamin' of You"	Unreleased, Time Out of Mind	5:54
11.	"Huck's Tune"	From the Lucky You soundtrack	4:09
12.	"Marchin' to the City"	Unreleased, Time Out of Mind	6:36
13.	"High Water (For Charley Patton)"	Live, August 23, 2003, Niagara Falls, Ontario, Canada	6:40
Total length:			67:43

Disc two
No.	Title	Writer(s)	Origin	Length
1.	"Mississippi"		Alternate version 2, Time Out of Mind	6:24
2.	"32-20 Blues"	Robert Johnson	Unreleased, World Gone Wrong	4:22
3.	"Series of Dreams"		Unreleased, Oh Mercy	6:27
4.	"God Knows"		Unreleased, Oh Mercy	3:12
5.	"Can't Escape from You"		Unreleased, December 2005 recording	5:22
6.	"Dignity"		Unreleased, Oh Mercy	5:25
7.	"Ring Them Bells"		Live at the Supper Club, November 17, 1993, New York, NY	4:59
8.	"Cocaine Blues"	T. J. "Red" Arnall	Live, August 24, 1997, Vienna, VA	4:40
9.	"Ain't Talkin'"		Alternate version, Modern Times	6:13
10.	"The Girl on the Greenbriar Shore"	A. P. Carter	Live, June 30, 1992, Dunkerque, France	2:51
11.	"Lonesome Day Blues"		Live, February 1, 2002, Sunrise, FL	7:37
12.	"Miss the Mississippi"	Bill Halley	Unreleased, 1992	3:20
13.	"The Lonesome River"	Ralph Stanley, Carter Stanley	Clinch Mountain Country, Ralph Stanley	3:04
14.	"'Cross the Green Mountain"		from the Gods and Generals soundtrack	8:15
Total length:				72:11

Disc three (deluxe edition)
No.	Title	Writer(s)	Origin	Length
1.	"Duncan & Brady"	traditional	Unreleased, 1992	3:47
2.	"Cold Irons Bound"		Live at Bonnaroo, 2004	5:57
3.	"Mississippi"		Alternate version No. 3, Time Out of Mind	6:24
4.	"Most of the Time"		Alternate version No. 2, Oh Mercy	5:10
5.	"Ring Them Bells"		Alternate version, Oh Mercy	3:18
6.	"Things Have Changed"		Live, June 15, 2000, Portland, OR	5:32
7.	"Red River Shore"		Unreleased version No. 2, Time Out of Mind	7:08
8.	"Born in Time"		Unreleased version No. 2, Oh Mercy	4:19
9.	"Tryin' to Get to Heaven"		Live, October 5, 2000, London, England	5:10
10.	"Marchin' to the City"		Unreleased version No. 2, Time Out of Mind	3:39
11.	"Can't Wait"		Alternate version No. 2, Time Out of Mind	7:24
12.	"Mary and the Soldier"	traditional	Unreleased, World Gone Wrong	4:23
Total length:				62:11

7" vinyl (Deluxe Edition)
No.	Title	Origin	Length
1.	"Dreamin' of You" (Single Edit)	Unreleased, Time Out Of Mind	3:34
2.	"Ring Them Bells"	Alternate version, Oh Mercy	3:18
Total length:			6:52

iTunes bonus track
No.	Title	Origin	Length
15.	"Love Sick"	Live	5:40
Total length:			77:51

Note: The official Bob Dylan website offered a deluxe edition of the album, including a 150-page book and a bonus disc of tracks on top of the regular edition. Fans who pre-ordered the deluxe set directly from Bob Dylan's website also received an exclusive 7" vinyl. The first 5,000 customers were also given a Theme Time Radio Hour poster. The Bootleg Series Vol. 8 was also released on vinyl as 4 x 180g. LPs, plus a digital download and a 12" x 12" version of the book authored by Larry Sloman.

== Charts ==
Chart performance for The Bootleg Series Vol. 8: Tell Tale Signs: Rare and Unreleased 1989–2006
Chart (2008)	Peak position
Australian Albums (ARIA)	32
Austrian Albums (Ö3 Austria)	37
Belgian Albums (Ultratop Flanders)	12
Belgian Albums (Ultratop Wallonia)	55
Canadian Albums (Billboard)	17
Danish Albums (Hitlisten)	5
Dutch Albums (Album Top 100)	15
French Albums (SNEP)	68
German Albums (Offizielle Top 100)	17
Italian Albums (FIMI)	14
New Zealand Albums (RMNZ)	14
Norwegian Albums (VG-lista)	4
Spanish Albums (Promusicae)	31
Swedish Albums (Sverigetopplistan)	7
Swiss Albums (Schweizer Hitparade)	36
UK Albums (Official Charts)	9
US Billboard 200	6

== See also ==
- The Bootleg Series Vol. 17: Fragments – Time Out of Mind Sessions (1996–1997) - 2023 compilation of further demos and outtakes from the Time Out of Mind sessions
