= MTV Unplugged (Bob Dylan album) =

Live album by Bob Dylan
- Released: April 11, 1995
- Recorded: November 17–18, 1994
- Venues: Sony Studios, New York City
- Genres: Folk rock; rock and roll; folk
- Length: 64:04 (US release); 69:26 (UK release & DVD)
- Label: Columbia
- Producer: Jeff Rosen

Bob Dylan chronology
Bob Dylan's Greatest Hits Volume 3 (1994)	MTV Unplugged (1995)	The Best of Bob Dylan (1997)

Singles from MTV Unplugged
- 1. "Dignity" Released: May 1995

Professional ratings
Review scores
Source	Rating
AllMusic	2/5 stars
The Encyclopedia of Popular Music	3/5 stars
NME	5/10
Rolling Stone	4/5 stars

MTV Unplugged is a live album by Bob Dylan, released by Columbia Records in Europe on April 11, 1995, and in the U.S. on May 2, 1995. It was reissued by Sony in 2007. The album documents Dylan's appearance on the MTV Unplugged television series, recorded at Sony Music Studios in New York City on November 17 and 18, 1994. It gave Dylan his best sales in years, reaching US No. 23 and going gold, while hitting No. 10 in the UK. The performance was released on DVD in March 2004, including a 5.1 surround sound mix.

== Track listing ==
All tracks are written by Bob Dylan.

US CD release
No.	Title	Length
1.	"Tombstone Blues"	4:54
2.	"Shooting Star"	4:06
3.	"All Along the Watchtower"	3:36
4.	"The Times They Are a-Changin'"	5:48
5.	"John Brown"	5:22
6.	"Rainy Day Women #12 & 35"	3:31
7.	"Desolation Row"	8:22
8.	"Dignity"	6:30
9.	"Knockin' on Heaven's Door"	5:30
10.	"Like a Rolling Stone"	9:09
11.	"With God on Our Side"	7:16
Total length:		64:04

DVD, UK CD release
No.	Title	Length
1.	"Tombstone Blues"	4:54
2.	"Shooting Star"	4:06
3.	"All Along the Watchtower"	3:36
4.	"The Times They Are a-Changin'"	5:48
5.	"John Brown"	5:22
6.	"Desolation Row"	8:22
7.	"Rainy Day Women #12 & 35"	3:31
8.	"Love Minus Zero/No Limit"	5:22
9.	"Dignity"	6:30
10.	"Knockin' on Heaven's Door"	5:30
11.	"Like a Rolling Stone"	9:09
12.	"With God on Our Side"	7:16
Total length:		69:26

Note: The CD and DVD releases did not include "I Want You", "Don't Think Twice, It's All Right", "Hazel", "Everything Is Broken", "Absolutely Sweet Marie", "My Back Pages", or "Tonight I'll Be Staying Here with You", which were also performed at the shows.

== Personnel ==
- Bob Dylan – guitar, vocals, harmonica

Additional musicians

- Bucky Baxter – Dobro, pedal steel, steel guitar, mandolin
- Tony Garnier – upright bass
- John Jackson – guitar
- Brendan O'Brien – Hammond organ
- Winston Watson – drums

Technical personnel

- Greg Calbi – mastering
- Ed Cherney – mixing
- Randy Ezratty – engineering
- Kim Gaucher – illustrations
- Scott Hull – mastering
- Frank Micelotta – photography
- Jeff Rosen – executive producer
- Don Was – mixing
- Allen Weinberg – art direction

== Charts ==
Chart performance for MTV Unplugged
Chart (1995)	Peak position
Australian Albums (ARIA)	30
Austrian Albums (Ö3 Austria)	10
Belgian Albums (Ultratop Flanders)	27
Belgian Albums (Ultratop Wallonia)	49
Dutch Albums (Album Top 100)	18
German Albums (Offizielle Top 100)	24
New Zealand Albums (RMNZ)	34
Norwegian Albums (VG-lista)	2
Swedish Albums (Sverigetopplistan)	10
Swiss Albums (Schweizer Hitparade)	19
UK Albums (Official Charts)	10
US Billboard 200	23

== Certifications ==
Certifications for MTV Unplugged
Region	Certification	Certified units/sales
Australia (ARIA)	2× Platinum	30,000^{^}
United States (RIAA)	Gold	50,000^{^}
^{^} Shipments figures based on certification alone.
