= Man in the Long Black Coat =

1989 song by Bob Dylan

Song by Bob Dylan

from the album Oh Mercy
- Released: September 18, 1989
- Recorded: March/April 1989
- Studio: Mobile studio at 1305 Soniat St., New Orleans
- Genre: Rock; folk
- Length: 4:30
- Label: Columbia
- Songwriter: Bob Dylan
- Producer: Daniel Lanois

Oh Mercy track listing
- 10 tracks: 1. "Political World"; 2. "Where Teardrops Fall"; 3. "Everything Is Broken"; 4. "Ring Them Bells"; 5. "Man in the Long Black Coat"; 6. "Most of the Time"; 7. "What Good Am I?"; 8. "Disease of Conceit"; 9. "What Was It You Wanted"; 10. "Shooting Star"

"Man in the Long Black Coat" is a song written and performed by American singer-songwriter Bob Dylan, released in 1989 as the fifth track on his album Oh Mercy. It is a minor-key folk ballad, often described as "haunting" and frequently cited as a highlight of the album. The song was produced by Daniel Lanois.

== Composition and recording ==
The song's lyric tells the story of a woman who leaves her partner to run away with the mysterious title character. It is often interpreted as a reworking of the ancient "daemon lover" motif, in which a woman leaves her husband for the devil. Dylan explored this genre early in his career by performing the traditional folk song "House Carpenter", recordings of which can be found on The Bootleg Series Volumes 1–3 (Rare & Unreleased) 1961–1991 and The Bootleg Series Vol. 10: Another Self Portrait (1969–1971). In their book Bob Dylan All the Songs: The Story Behind Every Track, authors Philippe Margotin and Jean-Michel Guesdon muse about who the title character might be: "The incarnation of death, even the devil? But would Satan mention the Bible? More poetically, the mysterious man in a black coat could be the symbol of a journey, the loneliness of the pilgrim on the road seeking the truth. But Dylan does not want to reveal anything about the character's identity or even about his female companion. Perhaps she wanted to leave the world of corruption behind". In his memoir Chronicles: Volume One, Dylan compared the song to one of Johnny Cash's biggest hits: "I thought of it as my 'I Walk the Line', a song I'd always considered to be up there at the top, one of the most mysterious and revolutionary of all time, a song that makes an attack on your most vulnerable spots, sharp words from a master".

Like all of the songs on Oh Mercy, "Man in the Long Black Coat" was recorded in New Orleans, and Margotin and Guesdon see the "atmosphere of the Louisiana bayou [as] being immediately perceptible when listening" to the song. Lanois agreed, saying, "We spent a lot of time getting the ambience right, recording the neighborhood crickets - the genuine sound of the New Orleans night. It's a song that was directly inspired by the environment and mood of the city". Engineer Mark Howard also vividly remembers the recording session: "Malcolm [Burn] just jumped on the keyboards and started playing these crickets, and it made it really haunting, and y'know, we did a couple of takes and, bang, that was that: masterpiece done. That was the first time ever that hairs went up on my arm while I was recording music, it was magical".

== Personnel ==
According to the liner notes of the album

- Bob Dylan – vocals, six and twelve string guitar, harmonica
- Daniel Lanois – dobro
- Malcolm Burn – keyboards

== Critical reception ==
Rolling Stone's Anthony DeCurtis called the song "a chilling narrative ballad suffused with a medieval sense of sin, death, illicit sexuality and satanic power...the spare musical background evokes a universe frighteningly devoid of absolute meaning".

Dylan scholar Tony Attwood praised the song for both its lyrical ambiguity and clear-eyed sense of despair, claiming that "the brilliance of the song is that it meets all interpretations. The sense of continuing futility is overwhelming which ever way you look at it...Rarely has Dylan written more poignant, sad, desperate lines".

A 2021 Consequence article ranking Dylan's top 15 albums (in which Oh Mercy placed 14th) cited it as the best song on the album and called it a "lament, which could be right out of a Nathaniel Hawthorne short story collection, with an air of dark mystery and a chill that hits bone. It's difficult to imagine both Dylan's modern live show and his late ’90s resurgence in the studio without first mastering this type of cryptic narrative, drip-and-drab phrasing, and murky production.

== In popular culture ==
An instrumental portion of Dylan's original version is prominently featured in the Richard Gere-starring "Billy the Kid" segment of Todd Haynes' 2007 film I'm Not There. Mark Lanegan also recorded a version for the movie's official soundtrack but it is not heard in the film proper.

== Live performances ==
Dylan played "Man in the Long Black Coat" live 287 times on the Never Ending Tour between 1989 and 2013. A live version performed in Tampa, Florida on January 30, 1999 was made available to stream on Dylan's official website in April 1999. The live debut occurred at the Beacon Theatre in New York City on October 13, 1989. After the performance at Atlantico in Rome, Italy on November 7, 2013, there was a 12 year gap before the song returned as part of the Rough and Rowdy Ways World Wide Tour spring 2026 setlist. As of June 2026, Dylan has played the song 329 times.

== Notable covers ==
The song has been covered by over a dozen other artists. Among the most notable versions:

- Emerson, Lake & Palmer covered it on their 1994, and final, studio album In the Hot Seat
- Joan Osborne covered it for her 1995 album Relish.
- Mark Lanegan covered it for the I'm Not There (soundtrack) in 2007.
- Barb Jungr covered it on her 2011 album Man in the Long Black Coat: Barb Jungr Sings Bob Dylan.
- Patti Smith covered it live on her European tour in the summer of 2024.
