= Oh Mercy =

Studio album by Bob Dylan
- Released: September 12, 1989
- Recorded: February–April 1989
- Studios: Mobile studio, 1305 Soniat Street, New Orleans
- Genre: Rock
- Length: 38:46
- Label: Columbia
- Producer: Daniel Lanois

Bob Dylan chronology
Dylan & the Dead (1989)	Oh Mercy (1989)	Under the Red Sky (1990)

Bob Dylan studio album chronology
Down in the Groove (1988)	Oh Mercy (1989)	Under the Red Sky (1990)

Singles from Oh Mercy
- 1. "Everything Is Broken" Released: October 1989

Oh Mercy is the twenty-sixth studio album by American singer-songwriter Bob Dylan, released on September 12, 1989, by Columbia Records. Produced by Daniel Lanois, it was hailed by critics as a triumph for Dylan, after a string of poorly reviewed albums. Oh Mercy gave Dylan his best chart showing in years, reaching No. 30 on the Billboard charts in the United States and No. 6 in Norway and the UK.

== Background and recording ==
The composition of the songs at Dylan's home in Malibu and the recording of the album in New Orleans are described by Dylan in detail in the "Oh Mercy" chapter of his memoir Chronicles: Volume One. Engineer Mark Howard noted that Dylan had previously attempted to record the songs with Ronnie Wood but was dissatisfied with the results: "There's a whole version of Oh Mercy that was recorded with Ron Wood already. But I think Dylan had maybe decided he didn't like what had happened". In the spring or summer of 1988, U2 singer Bono put Dylan in touch with producer Daniel Lanois, and the two agreed to work together although the recording sessions would not commence until early 1989. Dylan biographer Clinton Heylin notes that Dylan finished recording the basic tracks for the album on March 29, 1989 but added new vocals (and other overdubs) for almost all the tracks the following month.

In their book Bob Dylan – All the Songs: The Story Behind Every Track, authors Philippe Margotin and Jean-Michel Guesdon call Oh Mercy "a renaissance" for Dylan and write of the recording sessions: "The arrangements are very reminiscent of Yellow Moon by the Neville Brothers, and Dylan eventually got familiar with this particular atmosphere. Lanois claimed Oh Mercy was a record you listen to at night because it was 'designed at night': 'Bob had a rule, we only recorded at night. I think he's right about that: the body is ready to accommodate a certain tempo at nighttime. I think it's something to do with the pushing and pulling of the moon. At nighttime we're ready to be more mysterious and dark. Oh Mercy is about that'. He added that if there was one lesson he learned from Dylan, it was working relentlessly while searching first and foremost for efficiency and speed. And he concluded, 'Oh Mercy was two guys on a back porch, that kind of vibe'. As for the songwriter, he recognized 'There's something magical about this record' and felt sincere admiration for the work of the Canadian producer".

== Outtakes ==
During a Sound Opinions interview broadcast on Chicago FM radio, Lanois told Chicago Tribune critic Greg Kot that "Series of Dreams" was his pick for the opening track, but ultimately, the final decision was Dylan's. Music critic Tim Riley would echo these sentiments, writing that "'Series of Dreams' should have been the working title song to Oh Mercy, not a leftover pendant." "Series of Dreams" would become the final track on The Bootleg Series Volumes 1–3 (Rare & Unreleased) 1961–1991, and was later included on 1994's Bob Dylan's Greatest Hits Volume 3.

"Dignity", another outtake, was performed live during a 1994 appearance on MTV Unplugged, and the same performance was later issued on the accompanying album. A remixed version of "Dignity" featuring new overdubs by producer Brendan O'Brien was also released on Bob Dylan's Greatest Hits Volume 3, while the original Lanois production would not see release until the soundtrack album of the television show Touched by an Angel.

Listed as "Broken Days/Three of Us" on the track sheets, the original version of "Everything Is Broken" was briefly issued on-line as an exclusive download on Apple Computer's iTunes music store. In 2008, it was remastered from a better source and reissued on The Bootleg Series Vol. 8: Tell Tale Signs. Described by Heylin as an "evocation of a fragmented relationship", the lyrics were later rewritten and overdubbed with new vocals and an additional guitar part.

Two more outtakes, "Born in Time" and "God Knows", were set aside and later re-written and re-recorded for Dylan's next album, Under the Red Sky. Versions of both songs from the Oh Mercy sessions were also included on The Bootleg Series Vol. 8: Tell Tale Signs. "The Oh Mercy outtake of 'Born In Time' was one of those Dylan performances that so surrendered itself to the moment that to decry the lyrical slips would be to mock sincerity itself", wrote author Clinton Heylin.

== Cover art ==
The photo on the cover of the album shows a mural that Dylan came across on a wall of a Chinese restaurant in Manhattan's Hell’s Kitchen on 9th Avenue and 53rd Street. The artist, Trotsky, who created the image of two people dancing was located (he lived near the mural) and permission was granted.

== Reception ==
Professional ratings
Review scores
Source	Rating
AllMusic	3.5/5 stars
Robert Christgau	B
The Encyclopedia of Popular Music	5/5 stars
Entertainment Weekly	A−
MusicHound	3/5 stars
Rolling Stone	4/5 stars

After disappointing sales with Knocked Out Loaded and Down in the Groove, Oh Mercy was hailed as a comeback. Consensus was strong enough to place Oh Mercy at No. 15 in The Village Voice's Pazz & Jop Critics Poll for 1989. Also in 1989, Oh Mercy was ranked No. 44 on Rolling Stone magazine's list of the 100 greatest albums of the 1980s.

Oh Mercy's production drew praise from a majority of critics. Robert Christgau of The Village Voice wrote, "Daniel Lanois's understated care and easy beat suit [Dylan's] casual ways, and three or four songs might sound like something late at night on the radio, or after the great flood. All are modest and tuneful enough to make you forgive 'Disease of Conceit,' which is neither." But as Heylin notes, "Though many a critic who had despaired at the sound of Dylan's more recent albums enthused about the sound on Oh Mercy, it was evident that rock music's foremost lyric writer had also rediscovered his previous flair with words".

Rock critic Bill Wyman criticized the production but praised the songs. "Taken over by Daniel Lanois, master of a shimmering and distinctive electronically processed guitar sound...[the album] is overdone", writes Wyman. "It's irritating to hear Dylan's songs so manipulated, but there are sufficient nice tracks—"Most of the Time", "Shooting Star", both simple and direct, among them—to make this by far the most coherent and listenable collection of his own songs Dylan has released since Desire".

Though it did not enter Billboard's Top 20, Oh Mercy remained a consistent seller, enough to be considered a modest commercial success.

To celebrate the album's 20th anniversary, Montague Street Journal: The Art of Bob Dylan dedicated roughly half of its debut issue (published in 2009) to a roundtable discussion on Oh Mercy.

It was voted number 438 in Colin Larkin's All Time Top 1000 Albums 3rd Edition (2000). In 2006, Q magazine placed the album at No. 33 in its list of "40 Best Albums of the '80s". During that same year, "Political World" appeared in the film Man of the Year. Michael Azerrad in a Rolling Stone article felt that "it would be unfair to compare Oh Mercy to Dylan's landmark Sixties recordings".

Lou Reed selected "Disease of Conceit" as one of his favorite songs of 1989.

== Track listing ==
All tracks are written by Bob Dylan.

Side one
No.	Title	Recorded	Length
1.	"Political World"	March 8, 1989 (overdubbed March 21 and April 8, 1989)	3:43
2.	"Where Teardrops Fall"	March 21 and 22, 1989 (overdubbed April 15–16, 1989)	2:30
3.	"Everything Is Broken"	March 14 or 15, 1989 (overdubbed April 1 and 3, 1989)	3:12
4.	"Ring Them Bells"	March 7, 1989 (overdubbed April 6, 1989)	3:00
5.	"Man in the Long Black Coat"	March 29, 1989 (overdubbed April 4, 1989)	4:30
Total length:			16:55

Side two
No.	Title	Recorded	Length
1.	"Most of the Time"	March 12, 1989 (overdubbed April 19, 1989)	5:02
2.	"What Good Am I?"	March 7, 1989 (overdubbed April 7, 1989)	4:45
3.	"Disease of Conceit"	March 8, 1989 (overdubbed April 1989)	3:41
4.	"What Was It You Wanted"	March 21, 1989 (overdubbed March 24 and April 3, 4 & 10, 1989)	5:02
5.	"Shooting Star"	March 14 or 15, 1989 (overdubbed April 1–3, 1989)	3:12
Total length:			21:42

== Personnel ==
According to the liner notes of the album

Musicians:

- Bob Dylan – vocals (all tracks); guitar ("Political World", "Everything Is Broken", "Man in the Long Black Coat", "Most of the Time", "What Good Am I?", "What Was It You Wanted", "Shooting Star"); twelve-string guitar ("Man in the Long Black Coat"); piano ("Where Teardrops Fall", "Ring Them Bells", "What Good Am I?", "Disease of Conceit"); organ ("Disease of Conceit"); harmonica ("Everything Is Broken", "Man in the Long Black Coat", "What Was It You Wanted", "Shooting Star")
- Daniel Lanois – guitar ("Ring Them Bells", "Most of the Time", "What Was It You Wanted"); dobro ("Political World", "Everything Is Broken", "Man in the Long Black Coat", "What Good Am I?"); lap steel ("Where Teardrops Fall"); omnichord ("Shooting Star")
- Mason Ruffner – guitar ("Political World", "Disease of Conceit", "What Was It You Wanted")
- Brian Stoltz – guitar ("Political World", "Everything Is Broken", "Disease of Conceit", "Shooting Star")
- Paul Synegal – guitar ("Where Teardrops Fall")
- Malcolm Burn – keyboards ("Ring Them Bells", "Man in the Long Black Coat", "Most of the Time", "What Good Am I?"); bass ("What Was It You Wanted"); tambourine ("Everything Is Broken")
- Tony Hall – bass ("Political World", "Everything Is Broken", "Most of the Time", "Disease of Conceit", "Shooting Star")
- Larry Jolivet – bass ("Where Teardrops Fall")
- Willie Green – drums ("Political World", "Everything Is Broken", "Most of the Time", "Disease of Conceit", "What Was It You Wanted", "Shooting Star")
- Cyril Neville – percussion ("Political World", "Most of the Time", "What Was It You Wanted")
- Daryl Johnson – percussion ("Everything Is Broken")
- Alton Rubin, Jr. – scrub board ("Where Teardrops Fall")
- Rockin' Dopsie – accordion ("Where Teardrops Fall")
- John Hart – saxophone ("Where Teardrops Fall")

Production:

- Daniel Lanois – producer
- Malcolm Burn, Mark Howard – recorder
- Daniel Lanois, Malcolm Burn – mixer
- Greg Calbi – mastering

== See also ==
- Chronicles: Volume One

== Certifications ==
Region	Certification	Certified units/sales
Canada (Music Canada)	Gold	50,000^{^}
Switzerland (IFPI Switzerland) CBS	Gold	25,000^{^}
Switzerland (IFPI Switzerland) Sony Music	Gold	25,000^{^}
United Kingdom (BPI)	Gold	100,000^{^}
^{^} Shipments figures based on certification alone.
