= Mason Ruffner =

American singer (born 1947)

- Born: 1947 (age 78–79); Fort Worth, Texas, U.S.
- Genres: Blues, rock
- Occupations: Singer, guitarist, songwriter
- Instruments: Guitar, vocals
- Years active: 1970s–present
- Labels: Various including CBS, Epic and Burnside Distribution Corporation
- Website: www.masonruffner.com

Mason Ruffner (born 1947) is an American blues and rock singer, guitarist, and songwriter. He has worked with many musicians including Bob Dylan, Daniel Lanois, Robert Ealey, Memphis Slim, John Lee Hooker, Jimmy Page and Ringo Starr. From 1985 to the present, Ruffner has released six albums, including Gypsy Blood (1987) and You Can't Win (1999).

== Life and career ==
Ruffner was born in Fort Worth, Texas, and grew up in a strict Protestant home. He initially relocated to California at the age of 17, but returned to Texas in the 1970s inspired to play music. His early musical experiences included playing at Fort Worth's Bluebird Lounge, playing alongside Robert Ealey in his backing ensemble known as the Five Careless Lovers. Moving on again he arrived in New Orleans in the late 1970s, intending to travel across Europe. However he was enchanted by the music he heard there, particularly work by Smiley Lewis and Huey "Piano" Smith.

Ruffner formed the Blue Rockers and found regular employment at Club 544. There he backed visiting musicians such as John Lee Hooker and Memphis Slim. Spotted playing in 1985 by CBS Records' Tony Martell, Ruffner was offered a recording contract with the label. His debut album, Mason Ruffner (1985), was produced by Rick Derringer, and earned critical acclaim from both Rolling Stone and The New York Times. He went on to tour supporting Jimmy Page and, in 1987, released Gypsy Blood, which was produced by Dave Edmunds. The album reached No. 80 in the Billboard 200. The single, "Gypsy Blood" peaked at No. 11 in the Billboard Hot Mainstream Rock Tracks chart.

His support work on tour at the back end of the 1980s included sharing the stage with Page again, plus later on with Crosby, Stills & Nash, U2 (The Joshua Tree Tour) and Ringo Starr.

In 1989, Ruffner played on Dylan's Oh Mercy album, and Daniel Lanois' Acadie. After this time, Ruffner bought a property in Wimberley, Texas, and largely withdrew from the music limelight for almost a decade. He then moved to Memphis, Tennessee, and performed at B.B. King's Blues Club. In 1997, Ruffner's third album, Evolution, was released in Europe but not in his homeland.

In 1999, Ruffner issued You Can't Win, which contained predominately self composed material. The album was more blues orientated, and featured a horn section for the first time on Ruffner's work.

The albums, Mason Ruffner Live and So Far, were released via CD Baby in 2007 and 2008.

== Influences ==
Ruffner's career has been inspired by Jimmy Reed, Jimi Hendrix, Bob Dylan, Lightnin' Hopkins and Howlin' Wolf. In addition, he has drawn influences from the literary work of the French poets, Comte de Lautréamont, Charles Baudelaire and Arthur Rimbaud.

== Credits ==
Ruffner's co-written "Angel Love (Come for Me)" has been performed by Carlos Santana, with whom Ruffner has made a number of live appearances. "Gypsy Blood", from Ruffner's album of the same name, was featured in the 1989 film, Steel Magnolias. Ruffner's music video for his single "Dancin' On Top Of The World", depicted him at the World Trade Center. Ruffner had a credit on Dylan's album, The Bootleg Series Volumes 1–3 (Rare & Unreleased) 1961–1991. In 1984, Ruffner performed at the San Francisco Blues Festival and, in 1998, performed at the Notodden Blues Festival. He also appeared at the Sweden Rock Festival in 2011.

== Accolade and quotation ==
In Bob Dylan's memoir, Chronicles: Volume One (2004), Dylan noted "Ruffner played in Bourbon Street clubs like the Old Absinthe Bar. He was a regional star, had a high pompadour, a gold tooth smile with a tiny guitar inlaid. He had a few records out and some explosive licks with funky edges, rockabilly tremolo-influenced, wrote songs, too, said that he'd hung around libraries reading Rimbaud and Baudelaire to get his language down. He also told me that as a teenager he had played with Memphis Slim. I thought I had something in common with him there. I'd played with Big Joe Williams when I was coming up. Mason had some fine songs. One of them had the line, "You do good things for people and it just makes them bad." I would have thought about recording it if I didn't have my own originals."

Quoted in The Dallas Morning News in 1986, Ruffner noted "You buy some dark sunglasses. Standing up front is a lot different to standing on the side, man. Believe me, there's a big difference".

== Discography ==
=== Solo albums ===
Year	Title	Record label
1985	Mason Ruffner	CBS Records
1987	Gypsy Blood	Epic Records
1997	Evolution	Archer Records
1999	You Can't Win	Burnside Distribution Corporation
2007	Mason Ruffner Live	CD Baby
2008	So Far	CD Baby
