= Tony Hall (musician) =

American musician

- Origin: New Orleans
- Occupation: Musician
- Instrument(s): Bass guitar, guitar, vocals
- Website: dumpstaphunk.com

Tony Hall is an American bassist, guitarist and vocalist from New Orleans. He is a founding member of Dumpstaphunk. His work includes affiliation with New Orleans artists Harry Connick Jr., Dr. John, the Neville Brothers, Aaron Neville, Jean Knight, June Yamagishi, Shannon McNally and the Meters. His recording and, or touring work also includes Bob Dylan, Emmylou Harris, Trey Anastasio, Dave Matthews, Willie Nelson, Joan Baez, Brian Eno, Daniel Lanois, Jewel, Edie Brickell, Carlos Santana, Jimmy Buffett, Bonnie Raitt, Linda Ronstadt, Pretty Lights, Herbie Hancock and Maceo Parker.
