= Chronicles: Volume One =

2004 memoir by Bob Dylan

Chronicles, Volume One
- Hardcover jacket
- Author: Bob Dylan
- Language: English
- Subject: Bob Dylan
- Genre: Autobiography; Music
- Publisher: Simon & Schuster
- Publication date: October 5, 2004
- Publication place: United States
- Media type: Print (hardback & paperback)
- Pages: 304 pp (first edition, hardcover)
- ISBN: 0-7432-2815-4 (first edition, hardcover)
- OCLC: 56634799
- Dewey Decimal: 782.42164/092 B 22
- LC Class: ML420.D98 A3 2004

Chronicles: Volume One is a memoir written by American musician Bob Dylan. The book was published on October 5, 2004, by Simon & Schuster.

The 304-page book covers three selected points from Dylan's long career: 1961, 1970, and 1989, while he was writing and recording Bob Dylan, New Morning and Oh Mercy, respectively. Chronicles was described on release as the first of a planned 3-volume collection; as of 2026, the other two volumes have not materalised.

The book spent 19 weeks on The New York Times Best Seller list for hardcover nonfiction books. Chronicles: Volume One was one of five finalists for the National Book Critics Circle Award in the Biography/Autobiography category for the 2004 publishing year.

== Background ==
Chronicles began as Dylan's attempt at writing liner notes for reissues of Bob Dylan, New Morning and Oh Mercy, but expanded into a larger project: "I got completely carried away in the process of... I guess call it, 'novelistic writing'". Dylan claimed to work without an editor or collaborator while creating the book.

== Summary ==
Defying expectations, Dylan wrote three chapters about the year between his arrival in New York City in 1961 and recording his first album, focusing on a brief period of relative obscurity, while virtually ignoring the mid-1960s when his fame was at its height.

He also devoted chapters to two lesser-known albums, New Morning (1970) and Oh Mercy (1989), which contained insights into his collaborations with poet Archibald MacLeish and producer Daniel Lanois. In the New Morning chapter, Dylan expresses distaste for the "spokesman of a generation" label bestowed upon him, and evinces disgust with his more fanatical followers.

At the end of the book, Dylan describes with great passion the moment when he listened to the Brecht/Weill song "Pirate Jenny", and the moment when he first heard Robert Johnson's recordings. In these passages, Dylan suggests that the process ignited his own songwriting.

== Reception and legacy ==
Chronicles received many positive reviews, with The Telegraph remarking that the book had "garnered unanimous critical acclaim in the press".

The New York Times said that the book "is lucid without being linear, swirling through time without losing its strong storytelling thread".

A review in New York magazine pointed out that many had speculated Dylan would write a "revenge memoir" and noted that "no doubt such a book would have been darkly fun, but the one Dylan's written instead is superior—both less palatable and more worthwhile. He's written a portrait of the artist as a young artist, foregrounding the evolution of his music. In doing so, he's gone back and reconstructed not what the rest of us have found fascinating about his career but what he found fascinating, so fascinating that he's been willing for 40-plus years to put up with the frequent and, by his own telling, sometimes nightmarish misfortune of being a cultural icon".

In an interview conducted by Jonathan Lethem, published in Rolling Stone, Dylan said he was very moved by the book's reception. "Most people who write about music, they have no idea what it feels like to play it. But with the book I wrote, I thought, 'The people who are writing reviews of this book, man, they know what the hell they're talking about.' It spoils you … they know more about it than me. The reviews of this book, some of 'em almost made me cry—in a good way. I'd never felt that from a music critic ever".

In 2019, Chronicles was ranked 95th on The Guardian's list of the 100 best books of the 21st century.

A 2020 Rolling Stone list of the "50 Greatest Rock Memoirs of All Time" placed Chronicles first, noting that "[I]t's safe to say that nobody expected [Dylan's] autobiography to be this intense. He rambles from one fragment of his life to another, with crazed characters and weird scenes in every chapter. It all hangs together, from his Minnesota boyhood (who knew Dylan started out as such a big wrestling fan?) to the 'deserted orchards and dead grass' of his Eighties bottoming-out phase".

=== Accusations of inaccuracy ===
Dylan biographer Clinton Heylin has shown skepticism concerning the factualness of the book: "Jesus Christ, as far as I can tell almost everything in the Oh Mercy section of Chronicles is a work of fiction. I enjoy Chronicles as a work of literature, but it has a[s] much basis in reality as Masked And Anonymous, and why shouldn't it? He's not the first guy to write a biography that's a pack of lies". Tom Carson of The New York Times Book Review also called the Oh Mercy chapter "a fairly fishy self-justification, but a good short story", and added: "The book is an act, but a splendid one – his sense of strategy vis-à-vis his audience hasn't been this keen in 30 years -- and it is a zesty, nugget-filled read". Though Dylan discussed his strategy for writing the book in a Time magazine interview in 2001: "I'll take some of the stuff that people think is true and I'll build a story around that", the book itself contained no prefatory statement to this effect.

=== Intertextual appropriation ===
Some Dylan fans, like New Mexico disc jockey Scott Warmuth and Catholic University scholar Edward Cook, have deeply researched the unique language used throughout Chronicles: Volume One, and discovered that the book appropriates phrases, anecdotes, and descriptions from numerous authors. Dylan incorporated unique phrases from books by Ernest Hemingway, Jack London, Mezz Mezzrow, Marcel Proust, Henry Rollins and Mark Twain into his narrative. Dylan also cribbed phrases from less-likely sources, such as a TIME article from 1961, and a travel guide to New Orleans.

A number of these instances of intertextual appropriation were detailed in David Kinney's book about hard-core fans of the artist, titled The Dylanologists: Adventures in the Land of Bob, as well as The Daily Beast.

== In popular culture ==
The book contains a passage where the young Dylan meets and receives encouragement from the professional wrestler Gorgeous George. This passage is dramatized in the Marcus Carl Franklin-starring "Woody Guthrie" section of the film I'm Not There, Todd Haynes' unconventional 2007 biopic of Dylan. According to Haynes, it was the last scene he wrote for the film and the only one directly inspired by Chronicles: Volume One.

== Volumes 2 and 3 ==
Simon & Schuster have said that Dylan was expected to have begun working on Chronicles Vol. 2 while on a break from the Never Ending Tour in May 2008. According to the book A Simple Twist of Fate, the sequel may feature a section detailing the making of Blood on the Tracks. In August 2010, a source close to Dylan told Rolling Stone that there were no current plans to publish Chronicles Vol. 2: "I hope there's another one. That's all I can say. If it was planned I'd tell you".

In September 2012, Dylan told Rolling Stone that he is working on Volume 2. Dylan was quoted as saying that he had already completed chapters concerning The Freewheelin' Bob Dylan and Another Side of Bob Dylan, and that the book may focus primarily on the early years of his recording career. During the interview, he claimed that the biggest holdup in the process was not the writing itself, but rather the editing: "I don't mind writing it, but it's the rereading it and the time it takes to reread it – that for me is difficult. The last Chronicles I did all myself".

== Audiobook and promotional CD ==
Simon & Schuster initially released two audio versions of the book. An abridged version of the book read by Sean Penn (a performance for which he was nominated for a Grammy Award) was released in 2004. An unabridged version, read by Nick Landrum, was released at the same time. A newly recorded, unabridged version read by Penn was released in 2026.

Columbia Records released a Chronicles promotional CD sampler featuring 6 songs that corresponded to the three main time periods covered in the book: a previously unreleased live 1962 version of "The Cuckoo", the New Morning tracks "New Morning" and "Father of Night", the Oh Mercy tracks "Political World" and "Man in the Long Black Coat" and a previously unreleased demo version of the song "Dignity" from 1989.
