= Bob Dylan discography =

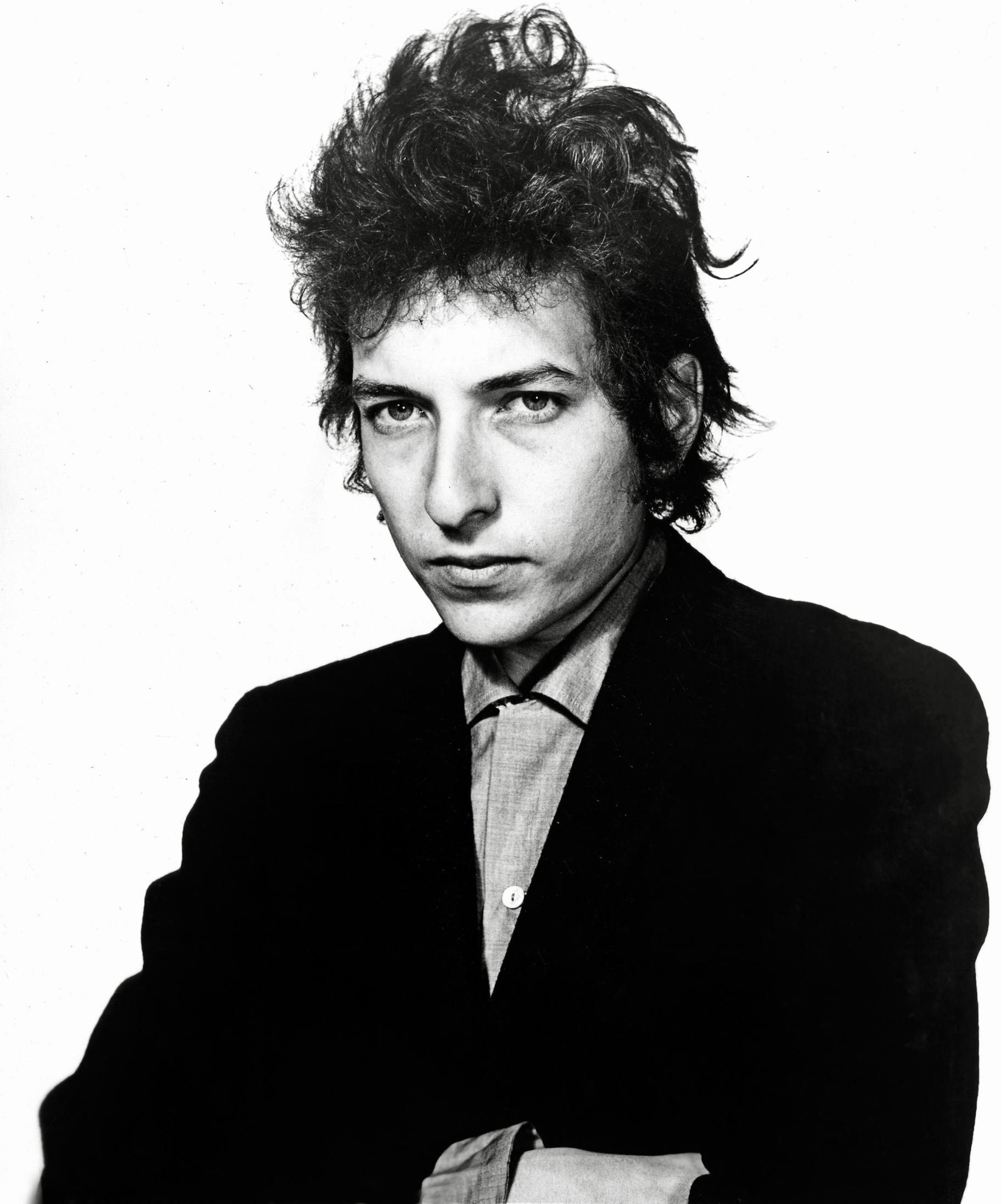
- Dylan in 1965
- Studio albums: 40
- Extended plays: 24
- Soundtrack albums: 7
- Live albums: 21
- Compilation albums: 44
- Singles: 105
- Video albums: 17
- Music videos: 61
- Bootleg Series: 18

American singer-songwriter Bob Dylan has released 40 studio albums, 21 live albums, 18 volumes of The Bootleg Series, 44 compilation albums, seven soundtracks as main contributor, 24 notable extended plays, 105 singles, 61 music videos, 17 music home videos, and two non-music home videos. His albums were released by Columbia Records, except for Planet Waves and Before the Flood, which were released on Asylum Records and later reissued by Columbia. Much of his music has been bootlegged; see Bob Dylan bootleg recordings. Dylan has posted many recordings and videos to his YouTube channel.

Dylan has been the subject of 11 documentaries, starred in three theatrical films; appeared in another 36 films, documentaries, and home videos; and is the subject of the semi-biographical tribute films I'm Not There and A Complete Unknown. He has written and published lyrics, artwork, and memoirs in 11 books; three of his songs have been made into children's books. He has done numerous concert and media appearances, joined collaborative projects, and contributed to tribute albums.

Dylan has won many awards for his songwriting and performances, including the 2016 Nobel Prize in Literature for his entire body of work.

== Albums ==
=== Studio albums ===
Title	Album details	Peak chart positions										Certifications (sales thresholds)
Title	Album details	US	AUS	CAN	FRA	GER	NLD	NOR	SPA	SWE	UK	Certifications (sales thresholds)
Bob Dylan	Released: March 19, 1962; Label/Catalog no.: Columbia CL-1779 (mono vinyl)/Columbia CS-8579 (stereo vinyl/CD); Format: Vinyl (mono/stereo), CD	—	—	—	—	39	—	—	—	—	13	BPI: Silver
The Freewheelin' Bob Dylan	Released: May 27, 1963; Label/Catalog no.: Columbia CL-1986 (mono vinyl)/Columbia CS-8786 (stereo vinyl/CD); Format: Vinyl (mono/stereo), CD	22	—	—	27	—	—	—	—	—	1	RIAA: Platinum; BPI: Gold
The Times They Are a-Changin'	Released: February 10, 1964; Label/Catalog no.: Columbia CL-2105 (mono vinyl)/Columbia CS-8905 (stereo vinyl/CD); Format: Vinyl (mono/stereo), CD	20	—	—	33	—	—	—	—	—	4	RIAA: Gold; BPI: Gold
Another Side of Bob Dylan	Released: August 8, 1964; Label/Catalog no.: Columbia CL-2193 (mono vinyl)/Columbia CS-8993 (stereo vinyl/CD); Format: Vinyl (mono/stereo), CD	43	—	—	—	24	—	—	—	—	8	RIAA: Gold; BPI: Silver
Bringing It All Back Home	Released: April 1965; Label/Catalog no.: Columbia CL-2328 (mono vinyl)/Columbia CS-9128 (stereo vinyl/CD); Format: Vinyl (mono/stereo), CD	6	—	—	35	—	—	—	—	—	1	RIAA: Platinum; BPI: Gold
Highway 61 Revisited	Released: August 30, 1965; Label/Catalog no.: Columbia CL-2389 (mono vinyl)/Columbia CS-9189 (stereo vinyl/CD); Format: Vinyl (mono/stereo), CD	3	—	—	35	28	—	—	—	—	4	RIAA: Platinum; BPI: Platinum; MC: Gold
Blonde on Blonde	Released: June 20, 1966; Label/Catalog no.: Columbia C2L-41 (mono vinyl)/Columbia C2S-841 (stereo vinyl/CD); Label/Sub-catalog nos.: Columbia CL-2516 (mono vinyl record 1) and Columbia CL-2517 (mono vinyl record 2)/Columbia CS-9316 (stereo vinyl record 1) and Columbia CS-9317 (stereo vinyl record 2); Format: 2×vinyl (mono/stereo), CD	9	4	—	30	—	—	—	11	—	3	RIAA: 2× Platinum; BPI: Platinum
John Wesley Harding	Released: December 27, 1967; Label/Catalog no.: Columbia CL-2804 (mono)/Columbia CS-9604 (stereo/CD); Format: Vinyl (mono/stereo), CD	2	1	—	2	—	—	—	7	—	1	RIAA: Platinum; BPI: Gold
Nashville Skyline	Released: April 9, 1969; Label/Catalog no.: Columbia 9825; Format: Vinyl, cassette, CD	3	2	3	1	24	2	2	4	—	1	RIAA: Platinum; MC: Gold; BPI: Gold
Self Portrait	Released: June 8, 1970; Label/Catalog no.: Columbia 30050; Format: 2×vinyl, cassette, CD	4	3	4	—	29	3	3	3	4	1	RIAA: Gold
New Morning	Released: October 21, 1970; Label/Catalog no.: Columbia 30290; Format: Vinyl, cassette, CD	7	4	5	—	—	3	8	9	4	1	RIAA: Gold
Pat Garrett & Billy the Kid	Released: July 13, 1973; Label/Catalog no.: Columbia 32460; Format: Vinyl, cassette, CD	16	28	22	—	—	—	—	8	—	29	RIAA: Gold
Dylan	Release: November 16, 1973; Label/Catalog no.: Columbia 32747; Format: Vinyl, cassette, CD	17	—	13	—	—	—	—	—	—	—	RIAA: Gold; BPI: Gold
Planet Waves†	Released: January 17, 1974; Label/Catalog no.: Asylum 1003 (1974 vinyl), Columbia PC/CK 37637 (1982 vinyl/CD); Format: Vinyl, cassette, CD	1	21	1	—	34	7	5	6	6	7	RIAA: Gold; BPI: Silver
Blood on the Tracks	Released: January 20, 1975; Label/Catalog no.: Columbia 33235; Format: Vinyl, cassette, CD	1	4	1	11	45	5	2	3	6	4	RIAA: 3× Platinum; BPI: Platinum; MC: Platinum
The Basement Tapes†	Release: June 26, 1975; Label/Catalog no.: Columbia 33682; Format: 2×vinyl, cassette, 2×CD	7	—	22	8	—	—	5	6	—	8	RIAA: Gold; BPI: Gold
Desire	Released: January 5, 1976; Label/Catalog no.: Columbia 33893; Format: Vinyl, cassette, CD	1	1	3	1	11	1	4	1	16	3	RIAA: 2× Platinum; BPI: Gold; BVMI: Gold; MC: Platinum
Street-Legal	Released: June 15, 1978; Label/Catalog no.: Columbia 35453; Format: Vinyl, cassette, CD	11	5	4	4	16	5	3	2	4	2	RIAA: Gold; AUS: Platinum; BPI: Platinum; MC: Platinum
Slow Train Coming	Released: August 20, 1979; Label/Catalog no.: Columbia 36120; Format: Vinyl, cassette, CD	3	1	13	1	22	5	1	1	2	2	RIAA: Platinum; AUS: 2× Platinum; BPI: Silver; MC: 2× Platinum
Saved	Released: June 23, 1980; Label/Catalog no.: Columbia 36553; Format: Vinyl, cassette, CD	24	18	30	3	41	31	5	9	9	3	BPI: Silver
Shot of Love	Released: August 12, 1981; Label/Catalog no.: Columbia 37496; Format: Vinyl, cassette, CD	33	22	—	—	50	28	5	15	8	6	AUS: Gold; BPI: Silver
Infidels	Released: October 27, 1983; Label/Catalog no.: Columbia 38819; Format: Vinyl, cassette, CD	20	6	14	22	31	9	1	16	3	9	RIAA: Gold; AUS: Gold; BPI: Silver; MC: Gold; RIANZ: 2× Platinum
Empire Burlesque	Released: June 10, 1985; Label/Catalog no.: Columbia 40110; Format: CD, vinyl, cassette	33	7	21	—	27	14	7	—	5	11	AUS: Gold; MC: Gold; RIANZ: 2× Platinum
Knocked Out Loaded	Released: July 14, 1986; Label/Catalog no.: Columbia 40439; Format: CD, vinyl, cassette	53	27	47	—	50	37	9	—	20	35	
Down in the Groove	Released: May 30, 1988; Label/Catalog no.: Columbia 40957; Format: CD, vinyl, cassette	61	41	46	—	55	—	7	—	22	32	
Oh Mercy	Released: September 12, 1989; Label/Catalog no.: Columbia 45281; Format: CD, vinyl, Cassette	30	26	23	42	37	58	6	45	15	6	BPI: Gold
Under the Red Sky	Released: September 10, 1990; Label/Catalog no.: Columbia 46794; Format: CD, vinyl, cassette	38	39	38	—	52	38	4	—	10	13	BPI: Silver
Good as I Been to You	Released: November 3, 1992; Label/Catalog no.: Columbia 53200; Format: CD, vinyl, cassette	51	—	38	—	68	71	11	—	22	18	
World Gone Wrong	Released: October 26, 1993; Label/Catalog no.: Columbia 57590; Format: CD, vinyl, cassette	70	—	37	—	—	—	—	—	39	35	
Time Out of Mind	Released: September 30, 1997; Label/Catalog no.: Columbia 68556; Format: CD, 2×vinyl, cassette	10	24	27	15	6	28	2	36	5	10	RIAA: Platinum; ARIA: Gold; BPI: Gold; MC: Gold
"Love and Theft"	Released: September 11, 2001; Label/Catalog no.: Columbia 85975; Format: CD, SACD, 2×vinyl, cassette	5	6	3	13	4	16	1	21	1	3	RIAA: Gold; BPI: Gold
Modern Times	Released: August 29, 2006; Label/Catalog no.: Columbia 82876 87606 2; Format: CD, 2×vinyl	1	1	1	17	2	2	1	5	2	3	RIAA: Platinum; ARIA: Platinum; BPI: Platinum; BVMI: Gold; MC: Platinum
Together Through Life	Released: April 28, 2009; Label/Catalog no.: Columbia 88697 43893 2; Format: CD, 2×vinyl	1	5	4	9	2	3	2	4	1	1	BPI: Gold
Christmas in the Heart	Released: October 13, 2009; Label/Catalog no.: Columbia 88697 57323 2; Format: CD, vinyl	23	—	33	119	37	34	5	54	6	40	BPI: Silver
Tempest	Released: September 10, 2012; Label/Catalog no.: Columbia 88725 45760 2; Format: CD, 2×vinyl	3	8	4	6	2	1	1	2	1	3	BPI: Gold
Shadows in the Night	Released: February 3, 2015; Label/Catalog no.: Columbia; Format: CD, vinyl	7	8	10	30	6	2	1	3	1	1	
Fallen Angels	Released: May 20, 2016; Label/Catalog no.: Columbia 88985316001; Format: CD, vinyl	7	11	24	35	7	7	8	4	5	5	
Triplicate	Release: March 31, 2017; Label/Catalog no.: Columbia 88985413492 RD 1-3; Format: 3×CD, 3×vinyl	37	36	57	40	7	5	10	7	3	17	
Rough and Rowdy Ways	Release: June 19, 2020; Label/Catalog no.: Columbia 19439780982; Format: CD, 2×vinyl	2	2	14	4	1	1	1	5	3	1	BPI: Gold
Shadow Kingdom	Release: June 2, 2023; Label/Catalog no.: Columbia/Legacy 19658767481; Format: CD, 2×vinyl	71	56	—	82	10	13	40	27	22	14	
"—" denotes releases that did not chart.

†: With The Band

=== Live albums ===
Title	Album details	Peak chart positions										Certifications (sales thresholds)
Title	Album details	US	AUT	CAN	GER	NLD	NOR	NZ	SPA	SWE	UK	Certifications (sales thresholds)
Before the Flood†	Released: June 20, 1974; Label/Catalog no.: Asylum AB 201 (1974 vinyl)/Columbia KG 37661 (1982 vinyl/CD); Format: 2×vinyl, cassette, CD	3	3	5	24	7	7	—	4	10	8	RIAA: Platinum; BPI: Gold
Hard Rain	Released: September 13, 1976; Label/Catalog no.: Columbia CK 39944; Format: Vinyl, cassette, CD	17	—	20	38	10	15	—	14	41	3	RIAA: Gold; BPI: Gold
Bob Dylan at Budokan	Released: August 21, 1978; Label/Catalog no.: Columbia C2 36067; Format: 2×vinyl, cassette, CD	13	7	13	24	6	2	3	17	4	4	RIAA: Gold; ARIA: Platinum; BPI: Gold; MC: Gold
Real Live	Released: November 29, 1984; Label/Catalog no.: Columbia 39944; Format: CD, vinyl, cassette	115	—	68	—	—	13	31	—	28	54	
Dylan & the Dead	Released: February 6, 1989; Label/Catalog no.: Columbia CK 45056; Format: CD, vinyl, cassette	37	—	—	55	72	16	—	—	33	38	RIAA: Gold
MTV Unplugged	Released: April 11, 1995; Label/Catalog no.: Columbia CK 67000; Format: CD, 2×vinyl, cassette	23	10	22	24	18	2	34	23	10	10	RIAA: Gold; BPI: Gold
Live 1961–2000: Thirty-Nine Years of Great Concert Performances	Released: February 28, 2001 (Japan) March 2001 (UK import); Label: SME; Format: CD	—	—	—	—	—	—	—	—	27	140	
Live at the Gaslight 1962	Released: August 30, 2005; Label/Catalog no.: Columbia A 96016; Format: CD	—	—	—	—	—	—	—	—	—	—	
Live at Carnegie Hall 1963	Released: November 15, 2005; Label: Columbia; Format: Digital download, promo CD	—	—	—	—	—	—	—	—	—	—	
Live Classics (a.k.a. Classics Live)	Released: 2007; Label/Catalog no.: Columbia/Sony Legacy 88697 21150 2; Format: CD	—	—	—	—	—	—	—	—	—	—	
In Concert – Brandeis University 1963	Released: October 19, 2010 (digital download); April 11, 2011 (physical); Label/Catalog no.: Columbia 88697 84742 2; Format: Digital download, CD, vinyl	128	—	—	—	—	—	—	—	—	59	
The 1966 Live Recordings	Released: November 11, 2016; Label: Sony Music; Format: 36×CD	—	—	—	—	—	—	—	—	—	—	
The Real Royal Albert Hall 1966 Concert	Released: December 2, 2016; Label/Catalog no.: Columbia/Legacy C2K 65759; Format: 2×CD, 2×vinyl	113	64	—	85	57	20	—	76	50	60	
Live in Sydney 1966	Released: December 2, 2016 (Australia); Label/Catalog no.: Columbia/Sony Music/Legacy 88985384101; Format: 2×vinyl	—	—	—	—	—	—	—	—	—	—	
Live 1962–1966: Rare Performances from the Copyright Collections	Released: July 20, 2018; Label/Catalog no.: Columbia/Sony Legacy 19075865322; Format: 2×CD, digital download	—	—	—	—	—	—	—	45	—	49	
The Rolling Thunder Revue: The 1975 Live Recordings (Sampler)	Released: June 7, 2019; Label: Columbia/Legacy; Format: Digital download	100	50	—	10	31	26	—	—	17	20	
The Rolling Thunder Revue: The 1975 Live Recordings	Released: June 7, 2019; Label: Columbia/Legacy; Format: 14×CD, digital download	100	—	—	—	—	—	—	—	—	20	
The Complete Budokan 1978	Released: November 17, 2023; Label: Columbia/Legacy; Format: 4×CD, 8×vinyl, digital download	—	—	—	—	—	—	—	—	—	6	
Another Budokan 1978	Released: November 17, 2023; Label/Catalog no.: Columbia/Legacy 19658843791; Format: 2×vinyl	—	—	—	—	—	—	—	76	—	6	
The 1974 Live Recordings	Released: September 20, 2024; Label: Columbia/Legacy; Format: 27×CD, digital download	—	—	—	5	—	—	—	—	—	95	
The 1974 Live Recordings: The Missing Songs from Before the Flood	Released: September 20, 2024; Label: Columbia/Legacy/Third Man; Format: 3×vinyl+7" vinyl	—	—	—	—	—	—	—	—	—	—	
"—" denotes releases that did not chart.

†: With The Band

=== The Bootleg Series ===
Year	Album details	Peak chart positions		Certifications (sales thresholds)
Year	Album details	US	UK	Certifications (sales thresholds)
1991	The Bootleg Series Vol. 1–3: Rare & Unreleased 1961–1991: Released: March 26, 1991; Label/Catalog no.: Columbia C3K 65302; Format: 3×CD, 5×vinyl, 3×cassette, digital download	49	32	RIAA: Gold; BPI: Silver
1998	The Bootleg Series Vol. 4: Bob Dylan Live 1966: The "Royal Albert Hall" Concert: Released: October 13, 1998; Label/Catalog no.: Columbia/Legacy C2K 65759; Format: 2xCD, 2×vinyl, digital download	31	19	RIAA: Gold; BPI: Silver
2002	The Bootleg Series Vol. 5: Bob Dylan Live 1975: The Rolling Thunder Revue: Released: November 26, 2002; Label/Catalog no.: Columbia/Legacy C2K 87047; Format: 2×CD, 2×CD+DVD, 3×vinyl+7" vinyl, digital download	56	69	RIAA: Gold
2004	The Bootleg Series Vol. 6: Bob Dylan Live 1964: Concert at Philharmonic Hall: Released: March 30, 2004; Label/Catalog no.: Columbia/Legacy C2K 86882; Format: 2×CD, 2×SACD, 3×vinyl, digital download	28	33	
2005	The Bootleg Series Vol. 7: No Direction Home: The Soundtrack: Released: August 30, 2005; Label/Catalog no.: Columbia/Legacy C2K 93937; Format: 2×CD, 4×vinyl, digital download	16	21	RIAA: Gold; BPI: Gold
2008	The Bootleg Series Vol. 8: Tell Tale Signs: Rare and Unreleased 1989–2006: Released: October 6, 2008; Label/Catalog no.: Columbia/Legacy 88697 35795 2; Format: 2×CD, 4×vinyl, digital download	6	9	BPI: Silver
2008	The Bootleg Series Vol. 8: Tell Tale Signs: Rare and Unreleased 1989–2006 (Deluxe Edition): Released: October 7, 2008; Label/Catalog no.: Columbia/Legacy 88697 35795 2; Format: 3×CD+7" vinyl, digital download	6	9	
2010	The Bootleg Series Vol. 9: The Witmark Demos 1962–1964: Released: October 19, 2010; Label/Catalog no.: Columbia/Legacy 88697 76179 2; Format: 2×CD, 4×vinyl, digital download	12	18	
2013	The Bootleg Series Vol. 10: Another Self Portrait 1969–1971 (Limited Deluxe Edition): Released: August 23, 2013; Label/Catalog no.: Columbia/Legacy 88697 76179 2; Format: 4×CD, digital download	21	5	
2013	The Bootleg Series Vol. 10: Another Self Portrait 1969–1971: Released: August 27, 2013; Label/Catalog no.: Columbia/Legacy 88883 73488 2; Format: 2×CD, 3×vinyl+2×CD, digital download	21	5	BPI: Silver
2014	The Bootleg Series Vol. 11: The Basement Tapes Complete† (Deluxe Edition): Released: November 4, 2014; Label/Catalog no.: Columbia/Legacy 88875019672; Format: 6×CD, digital download	41	17	
2014	The Bootleg Series Vol. 11: The Basement Tapes Raw†: Released: November 4, 2014; Label/Catalog no.: Columbia/Legacy 88875019672; Format: 2×CD, 3×vinyl+2×CD, digital download	41	17	
2015	The Bootleg Series Vol. 12: The Cutting Edge 1965–1966 (Deluxe Edition): Released: November 6, 2015; Label/Catalog no.: Columbia/Legacy 88875124422; Format: 6×CD, digital download	33	12	
2015	The Bootleg Series Vol. 12: The Best of the Cutting Edge 1965–1966: Released: November 6, 2015; Label/Catalog no.: Columbia/Legacy 88875124422; Format: 2×CD, 3×vinyl+2×CD, digital download, digital sampler	33	12	
2017	The Bootleg Series Vol. 13: Trouble No More 1979–1981 (Deluxe Edition): Released: November 3, 2017; Label/Catalog no.: Columbia/Legacy 88985454672; Format: 8×CD, digital download	49	21	
2017	The Bootleg Series Vol. 13: Trouble No More 1979–1981: Released: November 3, 2017; Label/Catalog no.: Columbia/Legacy 88985454672; Format: 2×CD, 4×vinyl+2×CD, digital download, digital sampler	49	21	
2018	The Bootleg Series Vol. 14: More Blood, More Tracks (Deluxe Edition): Released: November 2, 2018; Label/Catalog no.: Columbia/Legacy 19075858982; Format: 6×CD, digital download	25	9	
2018	The Bootleg Series Vol. 14: More Blood, More Tracks: Released: November 2, 2018; Label/Catalog no.: Columbia/Legacy 19075858982; Format: CD, CD sampler, 2×vinyl, digital sampler	25	9	
2019	The Bootleg Series Vol. 15: Travelin' Thru 1967–1969: Released: November 1, 2019; Label/Catalog no.: Sony Legacy 19075981932; Format: 3×CD, 3×vinyl, digital download, digital sampler	27	6	
2021	The Bootleg Series Vol. 16: Springtime in New York 1980–1985 (Deluxe Edition): Released: September 17, 2021; Label/Catalog no.: Sony Legacy 19075981932/Third Man Records; Format: 5×CD/4×vinyl/digital download	40	6	
2021	The Bootleg Series Vol. 16: Springtime in New York 1980–1985: Released: September 17, 2021; Label/Catalog no.: Sony Legacy 19439868832; Format: 2×CD, 2×LP, digital download	40	6	
2023	The Bootleg Series Vol. 17: Fragments: Time Out of Mind Sessions 1996–1997 (Deluxe Edition): Released: January 27, 2023; Label/Catalog no.: Sony Legacy 19439981992SC1; Format: 5×CD, 10×vinyl/digital download	63	9	
2023	The Bootleg Series Vol. 17: Fragments: Time Out of Mind Sessions 1996–1997: Released: January 27, 2023; Label/Catalog no.: Sony Legacy 19439981992SC1; Format: 2×CD, 4×LP, digital download	63	9	
2025	The Bootleg Series Vol. 18: Through the Open Window 1956–1963: Released: October 31, 2025; Label/Catalog no.: Sony Legacy 19802912992; Format: 8×CD, 2×CD (Highlights), 4×LP (Highlights), digital download	163	28	
"—" denotes releases that did not chart.

†: With The Band

=== Compilation albums ===
Title	Album details	Peak chart positions				Certifications (sales thresholds)
Title	Album details	US	AUS	SPA	UK	Certifications (sales thresholds)
Bob Dylan's Greatest Hits	Release: March 27, 1967; Label/Catalog no.: Columbia C 9463; Format: Vinyl, CD	10	—	6	6	RIAA: 5× Platinum; MC: 2× Platinum
Bob Dylan's Greatest Hits Vol. II (a.k.a. More Bob Dylan Greatest Hits)	Release: November 17, 1971; Label/Catalog no.: Columbia 31120; Format: 2×vinyl, CD	14	—	21	12	RIAA: 5× Platinum; MC: 2× Platinum
Masterpieces	Release: March 12, 1978 (Australia, New Zealand, Japan); Label: Columbia; Format: 3×vinyl	—	35	—	—	ARIA: 3× Platinum; RIANZ: 2× Platinum
Biograph	Released: November 7, 1985; Label/Catalog no.: Columbia C3K 38830; Format: 3×CD, 5×vinyl, 3×cassette, digital download	33	—	—	—	RIAA: Platinum; BPI: Silver
Bob Dylan's Greatest Hits Volume 3	Release: November 15, 1994; Label/Catalog no.: Columbia CK 66783; Format: CD, 2×vinyl	126	—	—	47	RIAA: Gold
The Best of Bob Dylan	Release: June 2, 1997 (UK, Canada, Australia, New Zealand); Label/Catalog no.: Columbia SONYTV28CD; Format: CD, Cassette	—	15	41	6	BPI: Gold
The Essential Bob Dylan	Release: October 31, 2000; Label: Columbia C2K 85168; Format: 2×CD	67	36	32	9	RIAA: 2× Platinum; ARIA: 3× Platinum; BPI: Platinum
The Best of Bob Dylan, Vol. 2	Release: November 28, 2000 (UK, Canada, Australia, New Zealand); Label/Catalog no.: Columbia 498361 2; Format: CD, 2×vinyl	—	12	—	22	ARIA: Gold
Bob Dylan Revisited: The Reissue Series The Limited Edition Hybrid SACD Set	Released: September 16, 2003; Label: Columbia/Sony Music CXH 90615/DSD; Format: 16×SACD	—	—	—	—	
The Bob Dylan Scrapbook 1956-1966 - Interviews	Release: September 13, 2005; Label: Simon & Schuster; Format: CD+Book	—	—	—	—	
The Best of Bob Dylan	Release: November 15, 2005; Label/Catalog no.: Columbia 82876 75013 2; Format: CD	53	—	—	—	
Blues	Release: June 27, 2006; Label: Columbia; Format: Digital download	—	—	—	—	
Bob Dylan: The Collection	Released: August 29, 2006; Label: Columbia; Format: Digital download (iTunes only)	—	—	—	—	
Dylan	Release: October 2, 2007; Label/Catalog no.: Columbia 88697 15349 2; Format: CD, CD+CD single, Digital download	36	25	6	10	ARIA: Gold
Dylan (Deluxe Edition)	Release: October 2, 2007; Label: Columbia; Format: 3×CD, digital download	93	—	—	10	
Playlist: The Very Best of Bob Dylan '60s	Release: December 16, 2008; Label/Catalog no.: Columbia/Legacy 88697 42227 2; Format: CD	—	—	—	—	
Playlist: The Very Best of Bob Dylan '70s	Release: March 31, 2009; Label/Catalog no.: Columbia/Legacy 88697 42942 2; Format: CD	97	—	—	—	
The Collection	Release: July 27, 2009; Label: Sony Music CMG; Format: CD	—	—	—	—	BPI: Gold
Playlist: The Very Best of Bob Dylan '80s	Release: October 12, 2010; Label/Catalog no.: Columbia/Legacy 88697 73811 2; Format: CD	—	—	—	—	
The Original Mono Recordings	Released: October 19, 2010; Label: Columbia; Format: 9×CD, 9×vinyl, digital download	152	—	—	157	
The Best of The Original Mono Recordings	Release: October 19, 2010; Label/Catalog no.: Columbia 88697791672; Format: CD	97	—	—	107	
All Time Best: Dylan	Release: March 29, 2011 (UK); Label/Catalog no.: Sony UK 88697850802; Format: CD	—	—	—	—	
Pure Dylan: An Intimate Look at Bob Dylan	Release: October 21, 2011 (Europe); Label/Catalog no.: Columbia/Sony Music 88697988082; Format: CD	—	—	—	—	
Beyond Here Lies Nothin' – The Collection	Release: October 24, 2011; Label: Sony CMG/Legacy; Format: 2×CD	—	—	—	156	
Super Hits	Release: April 21, 2012; Label: Sony CMG; Format: CD	175	—	—	—	
The Real Bob Dylan	Release: October 21, 2012; Label: Sony CMG; Format: 3×CD	—	—	—	80	BPI: Silver
The 50th Anniversary Collection (a.k.a. The Copyright Extension Collection Vol. I)	Released: December 27, 2012 (Europe); Label: Legacy; Format: 4×CD, limited digital download	—	—	—	—	
The Complete Album Collection Vol. 1 (including Side Tracks)	Released: November 5, 2013; Label: Columbia; Format: 47×CD, USB drive	—	—	—	—	
The Very Best of Bob Dylan	Release: November 12, 2013 (Europe); Label/Catalog no.: Columbia/Sony Music 84442/32; Format: CD, 2×CD	—	—	—	16	
Side Tracks	Release: November 29, 2013; Label/Catalog no.: Columbia/Legacy 88883772551; Format: 2×CD, 2×vinyl, digital download	—	—	—	—	
The 50th Anniversary Collection 1963	Released: November 2013 (Europe); Label: Sony Music; Format: 6×vinyl	—	—	—	—	
Playlist: The Very Best of Bob Dylan	Release: September 23, 2014; Label/Catalog no.: Columbia/Legacy 88875002312; Format: CD	—	—	—	—	
The 50th Anniversary Collection 1964	Released: December 2014 (Europe); Label: Sony Music; Format: 9×vinyl	—	—	—	—	
The 50th Anniversary Collection 1965	Released: December 4, 2015; Label: Columbia/Legacy; Format: Digital download	—	—	—	—	
The Music Which Inspired Girl from the North Country The Original Bob Dylan Recordings	Release: January 12, 2018; Label/Catalog no.: Columbia/Sony Music 19075810362; Format: 2×CD	—	—	—	—	
His Ultimate Top 40 Collection	Release: October 11, 2019 (Europe); Label/Catalog no.: Sony Music 19075991162; Format: 2×CD	—	—	—	—	
His Ultimate Collection	Release: November 22, 2019 (Europe); Label/Catalog no.: Columbia/Sony Music 19075991391; Format: Vinyl	—	—	—	—	
The 50th Anniversary Collection 1969	Released: December 6, 2019 (Europe); Label: Columbia/Legacy; Format: 2×CD	—	—	—	—	
The Best of The Bootleg Series	Release: October 2, 2020; Label: Columbia/Legacy; Format: Digital download, streaming	—	—	—	—	
The 50th Anniversary Collection 1970	Released: December 7, 2020 (Europe); Label: Columbia/Legacy; Format: 3×CD	—	—	—	—	
1970 – With Special Guest George Harrison (Note: A sticker on the shrinkwrap reads: "3-disc set 74 previously unavailable studio performances includes the complete 1970 recordings with George Harrison".)	Release: February 26, 2021; Label: Sony Legacy; Format: 3×CD	76	—	—	13	
Mixing Up the Medicine / A Retrospective	Release: October 20, 2023; Label/Catalog no.: Columbia/Legacy 19658830972; Format: CD, vinyl, digital download, streaming	—	—	—	—	
50th Anniversary Collection 1973	Release: December 14, 2023 (UK); Label/Catalog no.: Columbia/Legacy 19658868312; Format: CD	—	—	—	—	
The 1974 Live Recordings	Release: September 20, 2024; Label/Catalog no.: Columbia/Legacy 19658890932; Format: CD, vinyl, digital download, streaming	—	—	—	—	
The Very Best of Bob Dylan	Release: November 24, 2024; Label/Catalog no.: Sony Music Entertainment; Format: Digital download, streaming	—	—	—	—	
50th Anniversary Collection 1974	Release: December 14, 2024 (Europe); Label/Catalog no.: Columbia Records; Format: Digital download, streaming	—	—	—	—	
"—" denotes releases that did not chart.

== Singles ==
Year	Title (A-side, B-side) Both sides from same album except where indicated	Peak chart positions							Certifications	Album
Year	Title (A-side, B-side) Both sides from same album except where indicated	US	US Main	US Cash	AUS	IRE	NL	UK	Certifications	Album
1962	"Mixed-Up Confusion" b/w "Corrina Corrina" (different take than the one from The Freewheelin' Bob Dylan)	—	—	—	—	—	—	—		Non-album track / Side Tracks
1963	"Blowin' in the Wind" b/w "Don't Think Twice, It's All Right"	—	—	—	—	—	—	—	RIAA: Platinum (Don't Think Twice); BPI: Gold	The Freewheelin' Bob Dylan
1965	"The Times They Are a-Changin'" b/w "Honey, Just Allow Me One More Chance" (from The Freewheelin' Bob Dylan)	—	—	—	—	—	26	9	BPI: Gold	The Times They Are A-Changin'
1965	"Subterranean Homesick Blues" b/w "She Belongs to Me"	39	—	52	—	—	26	9	RIAA: Gold	Bringing It All Back Home
1965	"Maggie's Farm" b/w "On the Road Again"	—	—	—	—	—	—	22		Bringing It All Back Home
1965	"Like a Rolling Stone" b/w "Gates of Eden" (from Bringing It All Back Home)	2	—	1	7	9	7	4	RIAA: 3× Platinum; BPI: Platinum	Highway 61 Revisited
1965	"Positively 4th Street" b/w "From a Buick 6" (from Highway 61 Revisited)	7	—	9	35	—	13	8	RIAA: Gold	Non-album track / Bob Dylan's Greatest Hits
1965	"Can You Please Crawl Out Your Window?" b/w "Highway 61 Revisited" (from Highway 61 Revisited)	58	—	58	98	—	—	17		Non-album track / Biograph
1966	"One of Us Must Know (Sooner or Later)" b/w "Queen Jane Approximately" (from Highway 61 Revisited)	119	—	—	—	—	—	33		Blonde on Blonde
1966	"Rainy Day Women ♯12 & 35" b/w "Pledging My Time"	2	—	2	17	—	9	7		Blonde on Blonde
1966	"I Want You" b/w "Just Like Tom Thumb's Blues" (recorded live in Liverpool, England, May 14, 1966)	20	—	25	72	—	19	16		Blonde on Blonde
1966	"Just Like a Woman" b/w "Obviously 5 Believers"	33	—	28	8	—	30	—		Blonde on Blonde
1967	"Leopard-Skin Pill-Box Hat" b/w "Most Likely You Go Your Way and I'll Go Mine"	81	—	—	—	—	—	—		Blonde on Blonde
1967	"If You Gotta Go, Go Now" b/w "To Ramona" (from Another Side of Bob Dylan)	—	—	—	—	—	—	—		Non-album track / The Bootleg Series Volumes 1–3 (Rare & Unreleased) 1961–1991
1968	"Drifter's Escape" b/w "John Wesley Harding"	—	—	—	—	—	—	—		John Wesley Harding
1968	"All Along the Watchtower" b/w "I'll Be Your Baby Tonight"	—	—	—	—	—	—	—		John Wesley Harding
1969	"I Threw It All Away" b/w "Drifter's Escape" (from John Wesley Harding)	85	—	60	64	—	17	30		Nashville Skyline
1969	"Lay Lady Lay" b/w "Peggy Day"	7	—	8	20	13	—	5	RIAA: Platinum; BPI: Silver	Nashville Skyline
1969	"Tonight I'll Be Staying Here with You" b/w "Country Pie"	50	—	45	53	—	—	—		Nashville Skyline
1970	"Wigwam" b/w "Copper Kettle (The Pale Moonlight)"	41	—	28	24	—	3	—		Self Portrait
1971	"If Not for You" b/w "New Morning"	—	—	—	—	—	30	—		New Morning
1971	"Watching the River Flow" b/w "Spanish Is the Loving Tongue" (different take than the one from Dylan)	41	—	31	63	—	18	24		Non-album tracks / Bob Dylan's Greatest Hits Vol. II
1971	"George Jackson" (big band version) b/w "George Jackson" (acoustic version)	33	—	30	—	—	11	—		Non-album tracks / Side Tracks
1973	"Knockin' on Heaven's Door" b/w "Turkey Chase"	12	—	10	10	9	51	14	RIAA: 3× Platinum; BPI: Platinum	Pat Garrett & Billy the Kid
1973	"A Fool Such as I" b/w "Lily of the West"	55	—	47	51	—	—	—		Dylan
1974	"On a Night Like This" (with The Band) b/w "You Angel You" (with The Band)	44	—	30	66	—	43	—		Planet Waves
1974	"Something There Is About You" (with The Band) b/w "Tough Mama" (with The Band)	107	—	76	—	—	—	—		Planet Waves
1974	"Most Likely You Go Your Way (And I'll Go Mine)" (with The Band) b/w "Stage Fright" (by The Band)	66	—	47	—	—	—	—		Before the Flood
1974	"It Ain't Me Babe" (with The Band) b/w "All Along the Watchtower" (with The Band)	—	—	—	—	—	—	—		Before the Flood
1975	"Tangled Up in Blue" b/w "If You See Her, Say Hello"	31	—	43	—	—	—	—	RIAA: Platinum	Blood on the Tracks
1975	"Million Dollar Bash" (with The Band) b/w "Tears of Rage" (with The Band)	—	—	—	—	—	—	—		The Basement Tapes
1975	"Hurricane" b/w "Hurricane Part II"	33	—	27	7	—	—	43	RIAA: Platinum; BPI: Silver	Desire
1976	"Mozambique" b/w "Oh, Sister"	54	—	49	—	—	—	—		Desire
1976	"Stuck Inside of Mobile with the Memphis Blues Again" (live) b/w "Rita May" (non-album track)	110	—	—	—	—	—	—		Hard Rain
1978	"Baby, Stop Crying" b/w "New Pony"	—	—	—	70	5	—	13		Street Legal
1978	"Is Your Love in Vain?" b/w "We Better Talk This Over"	—	—	—	—	20	—	56		Street Legal
1978	"Changing of the Guards" b/w "Señor (Tales of Yankee Power)"	—	—	—	—	—	—	—		Street Legal
1978	"Love Minus Zero/No Limit" b/w "Is Your Love in Vain"	—	—	—	98	—	—	—		Bob Dylan at Budokan
1979	"Forever Young" b/w "All Along the Watchtower" and "I Want You"	—	—	—	—	—	—	—		Bob Dylan at Budokan
1979	"Gotta Serve Somebody" b/w "Trouble in Mind" (non-album track)	24	—	37	96	—	—	—		Slow Train Coming
1979	"Precious Angel" b/w "Trouble in Mind" (non-album track)	—	—	—	—	—	—	—		Slow Train Coming
1980	"Man Gave Names to All the Animals" b/w "When You Gonna Wake Up"	—	—	—	—	—	—	—		Slow Train Coming
1980	"Slow Train" b/w "Do Right to Me Baby (Do Unto Others)"	—	—	—	—	—	—	—		Slow Train Coming
1980	"Solid Rock" b/w "Covenant Woman"	—	—	—	—	—	—	—		Saved
1980	"Saved" b/w "Are You Ready"	—	—	—	—	—	—	—		Saved
1981	"Shot of Love" b/w "Heart of Mine"	—	38	—	—	—	—	—		Shot of Love
1981	"Heart of Mine" b/w "The Groom's Still Waiting at the Altar"	—	—	—	—	—	—	—		Shot of Love
1983	"Union Sundown" b/w "Angel Flying Too Close to the Ground" (non-album track)	—	—	—	90	—	—	—		Infidels
1984	"Sweetheart Like You" b/w "Union Sundown"	55	—	60	74	—	—	—		Infidels
1984	"Jokerman" b/w "Isis"	—	—	—	—	—	—	127		Infidels
1984	"Highway 61 Revisited" (live) b/w "It Ain't Me Babe" (live)	—	—	—	—	—	—	168		Real Live
1985	"Tight Connection to My Heart (Has Anybody Seen My Love)" b/w "We Better Talk This Over" (from Street Legal)	103	19	—	65	—	—	107		Empire Burlesque
1985	"Emotionally Yours" b/w "When the Night Comes Falling from the Sky"	—	—	—	—	—	—	—		Empire Burlesque
1986	"Band of the Hand" (with The Heartbreakers) b/w "Theme from Joe's Death" (by Michel Rubini)	—	28	—	—	—	—	96		Band of the Hand
1986	"Got My Mind Made Up" b/w "Brownsville Girl"	—	23	—	—	—	—	—		Knocked Out Loaded
1987	"The Usual" b/w "Got My Mind Made Up" (from Knocked Out Loaded)	—	25	—	—	—	—	119		Hearts of Fire
1988	"Silvio" b/w "Driftin' Too Far from Shore" (from Knocked Out Loaded)	—	5	—	—	—	—	191		Down in the Groove
1989	"Slow Train" (with The Grateful Dead); CD single	—	8	—	—	—	—	—		Dylan & the Dead
1989	"Everything Is Broken"; CD single	—	8	—	—	—	—	98		Oh Mercy
1990	"Political World" b/w "Ring Them Bells"	—	—	—	—	—	—	112		Oh Mercy
1990	"Most of the Time"; Promotional CD single	—	—	—	—	—	—	—		Oh Mercy
1990	"Unbelievable"; CD single	—	21	—	—	—	—	93		Under the Red Sky
1991	"Series of Dreams"; CD single	—	—	—	—	—	—	—		The Bootleg Series Volumes 1–3 (Rare & Unreleased) 1961–1991
1992	"Step It Up and Go"; CD single	—	—	—	—	—	—	—		Good as I Been to You
1993	"My Back Pages"; CD single also includes "Knockin' on Heaven's Door" and "My Back Pages" (original version from Another Side of Bob Dylan)	—	26	—	—	—	—	—		The 30th Anniversary Concert Celebration
1994	"Dignity"; CD single	—	—	—	—	—	—	—		Bob Dylan's Greatest Hits Volume 3
1995	"Dignity" (live); CD single b/w "John Brown" (live), "It Ain't Me Babe" (from "Renaldo & Clara" soundtrack)	—	—	—	—	—	—	33		MTV Unplugged
1995	"Knockin' on Heaven's Door" (live); CD single b/w "The Times They Are a-Changin'" (live)	—	—	—	—	—	—	—		MTV Unplugged
1997	"Not Dark Yet"; CD single b/w "Tombstone Blues" (live, non-album track)	—	—	—	—	—	—	—		Time out of Mind
1998	"Love Sick"; CD single b/w "Love Sick" (live from the Grammy Awards), "Blind Willie McTell" (live, non-album track)	—	—	—	—	—	—	64		Time out of Mind
2000	"Things Have Changed" b/w "Blind Willie McTell" (live, non-album track)	—	—	—	—	—	—	58		Wonder Boys
2001	"Tweedle Dee & Tweedle Dum" b/w "Bye and Bye" (Special Limited Edition 7")	—	—	—	—	—	—	—		Love and Theft
2006	"Someday Baby"; CD single	— (Note: "Someday Baby" did not enter the Billboard Hot 100, but peaked at number 20 on the Bubbling Under Hot 100 chart.)	—	—	—	—	—	—		Modern Times
2007	"Most Likely You Go Your Way (And I'll Go Mine)" (Mark Ronson Re-Version) b/w original version (from Blonde on Blonde)	—	—	—	—	—	—	51		Non-album track
2008	"Discover Bob Dylan EP" ("The Times They Are A-Changin'" / "Mr. Tambourine Man" / "Tangled Up in Blue" / "Ring Them Bells" / "Thunder on the Mountain") (download only)	—	—	—	—	—	—	172	BPI: Silver (Mr. Tambourine Man); BPI: Silver	Dylan
2009	"Dreamin' of You" b/w "Down Along the Cove" (live version from Bonnaroo 2004)	—	—	—	—	—	—	—		The Bootleg Series Volume 8: Tell Tale Signs
2009	"Beyond Here Lies Nothin'" b/w "Down Along the Cove" (live version from Bonnaroo 2004)	—	—	—	—	—	—	—		Together Through Life
2009	"I Feel a Change Comin' On"; CD single with edited and album versions	—	—	—	—	—	—	—		Together Through Life
2009	"Blowin' in the Wind" (download only)	—	—	—	—	—	—	93	BPI: Silver	Dylan
2009	"Must Be Santa" b/w "Twas the Night Before Christmas" (spoken word, originally broadcast on December 20, 2006, on Theme Time Radio Hour, hosted by Dylan)	—	—	—	—	—	—	41		Christmas in the Heart
2010	"Make You Feel My Love" (download only)	—	—	—	—	—	—	152		Dylan
2012	"Early Roman Kings" (download only)	—	—	—	—	—	—	—		Tempest
2012	"Duquesne Whistle" b/w "Meet Me in the Morning" (alternate take of Blood on the Tracks song, non-album)	—	—	—	—	—	—	—		Tempest
2013	"Wigwam" (unreleased demo) b/w "Thirsty Boots" (unreleased demo)	—	—	—	—	—	—	—		Record Store Day exclusive / The Bootleg Series Vol. 10: Another Self Portrait
2013	"Motherless Children" (Live at the Gaslight Café, NYC, 1962) (download only)	—	—	—	—	—	—	—		Non-album track (studio take on The 50th Anniversary Collection)
2014	"Odds and Ends" (alternate version)	—	—	—	—	—	—	—		The Bootleg Series Vol. 11: The Basement Tapes Raw
2014	"Full Moon and Empty Arms"	—	—	—	—	—	—	—		Shadows in the Night
2015	"Stay with Me" (download only)	—	—	—	—	—	—	—		Shadows in the Night
2015	"The Night We Called It a Day" b/w "Stay with Me"	—	—	—	—	—	—	—		Shadows in the Night
2015	"Like a Rolling Stone" (Alternate Version)(Rolling Stone Germany exclusive 7") b/w "Desolation Row" (Piano Demo)	—	—	—	—	—	—	—		The Bootleg Series Vol. 12: The Cutting Edge 1965–1966
2016	"All the Way"	—	—	—	—	—	—	—		Fallen Angels
2016	"Melancholy Mood" (download only)	—	—	—	—	—	—	—		Fallen Angels
2017	"I Could Have Told You" (download only)	—	—	—	—	—	—	—		Triplicate
2017	"My One and Only Love" (download only)	—	—	—	—	—	—	—		Triplicate
2017	"Stardust" (download only)	—	—	—	—	—	—	—		Triplicate
2017	"Things We Said Today" (download only)	—	—	—	—	—	—	—		The Art of McCartney
2017	"When You Gonna Wake Up" (Oslo, Norway – July 9, 1981) (download only)	—	—	—	—	—	—	—		The Bootleg Series Vol. 13: Trouble No More 1979–1981
2018	"Masters of War" (The Avener Rework) (download only)	—	—	—	—	—	—	—		Non-album track (original version on The Free Wheelin' Bob Dylan)
2018	"Masters of War" (SherGun Remix) (download only)	—	—	—	—	—	—	—		Non-album track (original version on The Free Wheelin' Bob Dylan)
2019	"Tell Me That It Isn't True" (Take 2) b/w "Big River" (Take 1)	—	—	—	—	—	—	—		The Bootleg Series Vol. 15: Travelin' Thru, 1967–1969
2020	"Murder Most Foul"	— (Note: "Murder Most Foul" did not chart on the Billboard Hot 100, but reached number one on Billboard's US Rock Digital Song Sales chart.)	—	—	—	—	—	—		Rough and Rowdy Ways
2020	"I Contain Multitudes"	— (Note: "I Contain Multitudes" reached number five on Billboard's US Rock Digital Song Sales chart.)	—	—	—	—	—	—		Rough and Rowdy Ways
2020	"False Prophet"	—	—	—	—	—	—	—		Rough and Rowdy Ways
2021	"Blind Willie McTell" (Take 1) (non-album, alternate take with Mick Taylor on guitar from 1983 Infidels sessions) b/w "Blind Willie McTell" (Take 5)	—	—	—	—	—	—	—		The Bootleg Series Vol. 16: Springtime in New York 1980–1985
2023	"Love Sick" (Version 1) (Rolling Stone Germany exclusive 7") b/w "Cold Irons Bound" (live in Oslo, May 19th, 2000)	—	—	—	—	—	—	—		The Bootleg Series Vol. 17: Fragments – Time Out of Mind Sessions (1996–1997)
2023	"Watching the River Flow"	—	—	—	—	—	—	—		Shadow Kingdom
2024	"Forever Young" (live in Seattle, Feb 9, 1974 (Afternoon Show))	—	—	—	—	—	—	—		The 1974 Live Recordings
2025	"Rocks and Gravel (Solid Road)"	—	—	—	—	—	—	—		The Bootleg Series Vol. 18: Through the Open Window 1956–1963

=== Other charted and certified songs ===
Year	Title	Certifications	Album
1975	"Shelter from the Storm"	RIAA: Platinum	Blood on the Tracks

=== Billboard Year-End performances ===
Year	Song	Year-End position
1965	"Like a Rolling Stone"	41
1966	"Rainy Day Women #12 & 35"	74
1969	"Lay Lady Lay"	52

== Extended plays ==
These are notable EP releases, mostly containing exclusive non-album tracks. See discogs.com for more foreign EPs that mostly contain just album version tracks or are just domestic promotional album samplers.

=== Live EPs ===
Year	Title	# of Tracks	Country	Format
1970	Live at Isle of Wight	4	Japan	7"
1977	In Concerto	4	Italy	7"
1978	4 Songs from "Renaldo and Clara"	4	US	Promo 12″
1997	Live '96	4	US	Promo CD
1997	Not Dark Yet	4	EU	Maxi CD
1998	Love Sick: Live Version	4	EU	Maxi CD
1999	Love Sick: Dylan Alive! Vol. 1	8	Japan	2x Maxi CD
1999	Not Dark Yet: Dylan Alive! Vol. 2	4	Japan	Maxi CD
1999	Million Miles (Live Recordings 1997–1999)	4	US/EU/Canada	Promo CD
2000	Things Have Changed: Dylan Alive! Vol. 3	4	Japan	Maxi CD
2001	Things Have Changed: Live & Unreleased / Live & Rare	4	US/EU/Canada	Promo CD
2002	Live & Rare 2	3	UK/EU/Canada	Promo CD
2007	Dylan Live E.P.	4	EU	Promo CD

=== Compilation EPs ===
Year	Title	# of Tracks	Country	Format
1976	Mr. D's Collection #2	4	Japan	7″
1982	Electric Lunch	6	US	Promo 12″
2004	Lovesick	9	US	Ltd. Ed. Victoria's Secret exclusive CD
2004	Chronicles Volume One	6	US/EU	Ltd. Ed. Promo CD
2005	Exclusive Outtakes from No Direction Home	3	US	Download Bonus
2006	Rollin' and Tumblin'	3	US	CD
2008	Discover Bob Dylan	6	Canada	CD/Download Bonus
2011	Can You Please Crawl Out Your Window?	8	US/EU	RSD Black Friday Ltd. Ed. 4x7″ 5000 numbered mono box set
2016	Melancholy Mood	4	US/Japan	RSD Ltd. Ed. red 7″
2019	Make You Feel My Love	4	Japan	Sony Records Int'l Ltd. Ed. blue 7″
2021	Jokerman b/w I and I (The Reggae Remix)	4	US/EU	RSD Ltd. Ed. 12″/streaming/download

== Other appearances ==
=== Studio appearances as primary artist ===
Year	Song(s)	Album	Notes
1963	"John Brown", "Only a Hobo" and "Talkin' Devil"	Broadside Ballads Vol. 1	as Blind Boy Grunt
1986	"Band of the Hand"	Band of the Hand	with the Heartbreakers
1987	"The Usual", "Night After Night", "Had a Dream About You, Baby"	Hearts of Fire	"The Usual" is a John Hiatt cover; Dylan co-stars in film
1988	"Pretty Boy Floyd"	Folkways: A Vision Shared	Woody Guthrie cover
1990	"People Get Ready"	Flashback	The Impressions cover
1991	"This Old Man"	For Our Children	traditional song
1994	"You Belong to Me"	Natural Born Killers	Pee Wee King, Chilton Price and Redd Stewart cover
1995	"Boogie Woogie Country Girl"	Till the Night Is Gone: A Tribute to Doc Pomus	Doc Pomus cover
1996	"Ring of Fire"	Feeling Minnesota	June Carter Cash and Merle Kilgore cover
1997	"My Blue Eyed Jane"	The Songs of Jimmie Rodgers: A Tribute	Jimmie Rodgers cover
1999	"Chimes of Freedom"	The '60s	with Joan Osborne
2000	"Things Have Changed"	Wonder Boys	soundtrack also features "Shooting Star", "Not Dark Yet", "Buckets of Rain" from previous albums
2001	"Return to Me"	The Sopranos: Peppers & Eggs	Carmen Lombardo and Danny Di Minno cover
2001	"I Can't Get You Off of My Mind"	Timeless: Tribute to Hank Williams	Hank Williams cover
2001	"Red Cadillac and a Black Moustache"	Good Rockin' Tonight: The Legacy of Sun Records	Lillian May and Willie Bea Thompson cover
2002	"Waitin' for You"	Divine Secrets of the Ya-Ya Sisterhood	
2002	"Train of Love"	Kindred Spirits: A Tribute to the Songs of Johnny Cash	Johnny Cash cover
2003	"Cross the Green Mountain"	Gods and Generals	
2003	"Gonna Change My Way of Thinking"	Gotta Serve Somebody: The Gospel Songs of Bob Dylan	with Mavis Staples
2003	"Down in the Flood (new version)", "Diamond Joe", "Dixie" and "Cold Irons Bound (new version)"	Masked and Anonymous	"Dixie" is a Daniel Decatur Emmett cover; Dylan co-stars in film
2004	"Mutineer"	Enjoy Every Sandwich: The Songs of Warren Zevon	Warren Zevon cover
2005	"Tell Ol' Bill"	North Country	soundtrack also features "Lay Lady Lay", "Sweetheart Like You", and "Do Right to Me Baby (Do Unto Others)" from previous albums
2007	"Huck's Tune"	Lucky You	soundtrack also features "Like a Rolling Stone" from Highway 61 Revisited
2007	"I'm Not There"	I'm Not There	originally recorded for The Basement Tapes
2009	"California"	NCIS: Vol. 2	originally recorded for Bringing It All Back Home
2009	"Do Re Mi"	The People Speak	Woody Guthrie cover
2011	"Don't Ever Take Yourself Away"	Hawaii Five-0	originally recorded for Shot of Love
2011	"The Love That Faded"	The Lost Notebooks of Hank Williams	based on lyrics by Hank Williams
2013	"Farewell"	Inside Llewyn Davis	demo version on The Bootleg Series Vol. 9: The Witmark Demos - 1962-1964
2014	"Things We Said Today"	The Art of McCartney	The Beatles cover
2018	"He's Funny That Way"	Universal Love: Wedding Songs Reimagined	Neil Moret and Richard Whiting cover
2024	"Don't Fence Me In"	Reagan	Cole Porter cover

=== Live appearances and remixes as primary artist ===
Year	Song(s)	Album	Notes
1972	"I Ain't Got No Home", "Dear Mrs. Roosevelt", and "The Grand Coulee Dam"	A Tribute to Woody Guthrie	recorded live in 1968
1993	"It's Alright, Ma (I'm Only Bleeding)", "My Back Pages", Knockin' on Heaven's Door", and "Girl from the North Country"	The 30th Anniversary Concert Celebration	recorded live in 1992; "My Back Pages" and "Knockin' on Heaven's Door" with various artists
1996	"Shelter from the Storm (alternate version)"	Jerry Maguire	original version on Blood on the Tracks
1998	"Dignity (alternate version)"	Touched by an Angel: The Album	original recording from the Oh Mercy sessions

=== Contributions ===
Year	Album/Single	Collaborator	Comment
1962	The Midnight Special	Harry Belafonte	Harmonica on "Midnight Special"
1962	Carolyn Hester	Carolyn Hester	Harmonica on "I'll Fly Away", "Swing and Turn Jubilee" and "Come Back, Baby"
1962	Three Kings and a Queen – Victoria Spivey	Big Joe Williams	"Sitting on Top of the World", and "Wichita"
1962	Kings and The Queen – Volume 2 Victoria Spivey	Big Joe Williams, Victoria Spivey	"It's Dangerous"
1962	Kings and The Queen – Volume 2 Victoria Spivey	Various artists	"It's Dangerous"
1963	Broadside Ballads Vol.1	Various artists	Vocals on Happy Traum's rendition of "I Will Not Go Down Under the Ground"
1964	The Blues Project	Various artists	Credited as "Bob Landy"; played treble piano on "Downtown Blues"
1969	At San Quentin	Johnny Cash	Writer of Wanted Man
1970	Little Fauss and Big Halsy	Johnny Cash	Writer of Wanted Man
1971	The Concert for Bangladesh	George Harrison & Friends	Vocals and guitar on five songs
1971	Earl Scruggs Performing with His Family and Friends	Earl Scruggs	Guitar on "Nashville Skyline Rag" single (1970), Album (1971) and Documentary also with "East Virginia Blues" (1972)
1972	Rock of Ages	The Band	Vocals on Bonus Material on 2001 Re-release
1972	A Tribute to Woody Guthrie	Various Artists	Vocals on three songs
1972	David Bromberg	David Bromberg	Harmonica on "Sammy's Song"
1972	Somebody Else's Troubles	Steve Goodman	Piano & harmony vocals as Robert Milkwood Thomas on "Somebody Else's Troubles"
1972	Broadside Ballads Vol.6: Broadside Reunion	Various artists	Credited as "Blind Boy Grunt"; appeared on "Train A-Travelin'", "Dreadful Day", "The Ballad of Emmett Till" and "The Ballad of Donald White"
1973	Roger McGuinn	Roger McGuinn	Harmonica on "I'm So Restless"
1973	Doug Sahm and Band	Doug Sahm	Guitar and vocals on "(Is Anybody Going To) San Antone", "Wallflower", "Blues Stay Away From Me" and harp on "Me and Paul"
1974	Barry Goldberg	Barry Goldberg	Producer
1976	Songs for the New Depression	Bette Midler	Duet with Midler on "Buckets of Rain"
1976	No Reason to Cry	Eric Clapton	Duet with Clapton on "Sign Language", which he also wrote
1977	Death of a Ladies' Man	Leonard Cohen	Backing Vocals on "Don't Go Home With Your Hard-On"
1978	The Last Waltz	The Band	Vocals and rhythm guitar on five songs
1980	So You Wanna Go Back to Egypt	Keith Green	Harmonica on "Pledge My Head to Heaven"
1982	First Blues	Allen Ginsberg	Guitar and Vocals on "Going To San Diego", "Vomit Express" and "Jimmy Berman Rag"
1985	"Sweet, Sweet Baby (I'm Falling)" UK Single	Lone Justice	Writer and Harmonica on "Go Away Little Boy"
1985	We Are the World	USA for Africa	Vocals
1985	Sun City	Artists United Against Apartheid	Vocals
1986	Kingdom Blow	Kurtis Blow	Vocals on "Street Rock"
1987	Let Me Up (I've Had Enough)	Tom Petty and the Heartbreakers	Co-writer of "Jammin' Me"
1987	Hearts of Fire Soundtrack	Various Artists	Writer and vocals on three songs
1988	Rattle and Hum	U2	Vocals and Co-writer on "Love Rescue Me"
1988	Traveling Wilburys Vol. 1	Traveling Wilburys	Writer, vocals and rhythm guitar on various songs
1990	Traveling Wilburys Vol. 3	Traveling Wilburys	Writer, vocals and rhythm guitar on various songs
1991	Time, Love & Tenderness	Michael Bolton	Co-writer of "Steel Bars"
1993	Across the Borderline	Willie Nelson	Duet with Nelson on "Heartland", which he also Co-wrote with Nelson
1993	Other Voices, Other Rooms	Nanci Griffith	harmonica on "Boots of Spanish Leather"
1994	Street Angel	Stevie Nicks	Guitar and Harmonica on "Just Like a Woman"
1994	Third Annual Farewell Reunion	Mike Seeger	Guitar on “Ballad of Hollis Brown”
1996	Hindsight 20/20	Carlene Carter	Vocals on "Trust Yourself"
1998	Clinch Mountain Country	Ralph Stanley & Friends	Duet with Ralph Stanley on "The Lonesome River"
2000	The Ballad of Ramblin' Jack Elliot	Ramblin' Jack Elliot	Duet with Ramblin' Jack Elliot
2001	Not for Beginners	Ron Wood	Guitar on "Interfere" and "King of Kings"
2002	Postcards of the Hanging	Grateful Dead	Vocals on "Man of Peace"
2007	The Traveling Wilburys Collection	Traveling Wilburys	Writer, vocals and rhythm guitar on two previously unreleased songs and a new documentary (see Performer films below)
2008	Boo!	Was (Not Was)	co-writer of "Mr. Alice Doesn't Live Here Anymore", with Don Was and David Was
2014	Lost on the River: The New Basement Tapes	Various Artists	Lyricist on 20 songs from The Basement Tape Sessions of 1967 that were never recorded
2015	Dylan, Cash, and The Nashville Cats: A New Music City	Various Artists	Four songs, including a previously unreleased version of "If Not for You"
2018	Bear and a Banjo	Jared Gutstadt	Lyrics for "Gone But Not Forgotten"

== Releases with The Traveling Wilburys ==
=== Albums ===
Year	Album	Peak chart positions			Certifications	Record label
Year	Album	US	AUS	UK	Certifications	Record label
1988	Traveling Wilburys Vol. 1	3	1	16	RIAA: 3× Platinum; MC: 6× Platinum	Wilbury/Warner Bros. Records
1990	Traveling Wilburys Vol. 3	11	14	14	RIAA: Platinum; MC: Platinum	Wilbury/Warner Bros. Records

=== Other appearances ===
Year	Song	Album	Notes
1990	"Nobody's Child"	Nobody's Child: Romanian Angel Appeal	Cy Coben and Mel Foree cover

=== Compilations ===
Year	Album	Peak chart positions			Certifications	Record label
Year	Album	US	AUS	UK	Certifications	Record label
2007	The Traveling Wilburys Collection	9	1	1	RIAA: Gold	Wilbury/Rhino/Atlantic Records

== Videography ==
=== Concert videos ===
Year	Title	Format	Certifications
1986	Hard to Handle: Bob Dylan with Tom Petty and the Heartbreakers	Laserdisc/VHS	
1995	MTV Unplugged: Bob Dylan	VHS/DVD	RIAA: Gold; ARIA: 2x Platinum
2007	The Other Side of the Mirror: Bob Dylan at the Newport Folk Festival	DVD/Blu-ray	RIAA: Gold; ARIA: Platinum
2021	Shadow Kingdom: The Early Songs of Bob Dylan	Streaming/Download	

=== Music videos ===
Year	Video	Director	Other credits	Album
1964	"Mr. Tambourine Man" (live)	Murray Lerner	At the Newport Folk Festival, YouTube release 2012	The Other Side of the Mirror (film)
1965	"Maggie's Farm (The Speek)" (live)	Murray Lerner	At the Newport Folk Festival, iTunes release 2009	The Other Side of the Mirror (film)
1965	"Positively 4th Street"	Unknown	Unreleased promo spot, special feature on No Direction Home DVD	Single / Bob Dylan's Greatest Hits
1967	"Subterranean Homesick Blues"	D. A. Pennebaker	From Dont Look Back, featuring Allen Ginsberg and Bob Neuwirth	Bringing It All Back Home
1967	"Subterranean Homesick Blues" (alternate take)	D. A. Pennebaker	From 65 Revisited (2007), featuring Tom Wilson and Bob Neuwirth, 2000 DVD bonus	Bringing It All Back Home
1978	"Tangled Up in Blue" (live 1975)	Bob Dylan	From Renaldo and Clara and 2002 Bonus DVD	The Bootleg Series Vol. 5: Bob Dylan Live 1975, The Rolling Thunder Revue
1978	"Isis" (live 1975)	Bob Dylan	From Renaldo and Clara and 2002 Bonus DVD	Biograph
1978	"One More Cup of Coffee (Valley Below)" (live 1975)	Bob Dylan / Martin Scorsese	From Renaldo and Clara and Rolling Thunder Revue: A Bob Dylan Story, Netflix release 2019	The Rolling Thunder Revue: The 1975 Live Recordings
1978	"Hard Rain" (live 1975)	Bob Dylan / Martin Scorsese	From Renaldo and Clara and Rolling Thunder Revue: A Bob Dylan Story, Netflix release 2019	The Rolling Thunder Revue: The 1975 Live Recordings
1983	"Gotta Serve Somebody"	John David Wilson	Animated film on Gotta Serve Somebody: The Gospel Songs of Bob Dylan DVD	Slow Train Coming
1983	"Sweetheart Like You"	Mark Robinson	Featuring Steve Ripley and Carla Olson	Infidels
1984	"Jokerman"	Larry Sloman / George Lois	Features lyrics	Infidels
1985	"Tight Connection to My Heart (Has Anybody Seen My Love)"	Paul Schrader	Takes place in Japan	Empire Burlesque
1985	"Emotionally Yours"	David A. Stewart	Featuring Mike Campbell	Empire Burlesque
1985	"When the Night Comes Falling from the Sky"	Eddie Arno / Markus Innocenti	Featuring David A. Stewart	Empire Burlesque
1986	"Band of the Hand (It's Hell Time Man!)"	Paul Michael Glaser	Produced by Michael Mann and featuring Tom Petty and the Heartbreakers, Stevie Nicks on backing vocals	Band of the Hand Soundtrack
1989	"Political World"	John Mellencamp	Featuring Mason Ruffner	Oh Mercy
1990	"Most of the Time"	Jesse Dylan	Live version recorded at the Record Plant, Hollywood, CA on March 16, 1990, backed by Malcolm Burn, Willie Green and Tony Hall	Oh Mercy
1990	"Unbelievable"	Paris Barclay	Starring Molly Ringwald	Under the Red Sky
1991	"Series of Dreams"	Meiert Avis	Archive Footage	The Bootleg Series Volumes 1–3 (Rare & Unreleased) 1961–1991 (Oh Mercy outtake)
1993	"Blood in My Eyes"	David A. Stewart	Black and white	World Gone Wrong
1993	"My Back Pages" (live)	Gavin Taylor	Featuring Roger McGuinn, Tom Petty, Neil Young, Eric Clapton and George Harrison	The 30th Anniversary Concert Celebration
1995	"Knockin' on Heaven's Door" (live)	Milton Lage	Featuring Bucky Baxter, Tony Garnier, John Jackson, Brendan O'Brien and Winston Watson	MTV Unplugged
1995	"Dignity" (live)	Milton Lage	Featuring Bucky Baxter, Tony Garnier, John Jackson, Brendan O'Brien and Winston Watson	MTV Unplugged
1997	"Not Dark Yet"	Michael Borofsky	Featuring Bucky Baxter, Brian Blade, Robert Britt, Cindy Cashdollar, Jim Dickinson, Tony Garnier and Jim Keltner	Time Out of Mind
1998	"Love Sick" (live)	Walter C. Miller	At the 40th Annual Grammy Awards	"Love Sick" single
2000	"Things Have Changed"	Curtis Hanson	Featuring Michael Douglas, Robert Downey Jr., Tobey Maguire and Katie Holmes	Wonder Boys (Music from the Motion Picture)
2003	"'Cross the Green Mountain"	Tom Krueger	Featuring Robert Duvall, Jeff Daniels and Stephen Lang from Gods and Generals (film)	Gods and Generals (Original Motion Picture Soundtrack)
2003	"Cold Irons Bound" (live)	Larry Charles	Featuring Charlie Sexton, Larry Campbell, Tony Garnier and George Receli	Masked and Anonymous (Music from the Motion Picture)
2006	"When the Deal Goes Down"	Bennett Miller	Starring Scarlett Johansson	Modern Times
2006	"Thunder on the Mountain"	–	Archive footage	Modern Times
2007	"Most Likely You Go Your Way (And I'll Go Mine)" (Mark Ronson Re-Version)	Rupert Jones	Featuring Wyclef Jean	Single (original from Blonde On Blonde)
2008	"Dreamin' of You"		Starring Harry Dean Stanton	The Bootleg Series Vol. 8: Tell Tale Signs: Rare and Unreleased 1989–2006 (Time Out of Mind outtake)
2008	"Mississippi" (alternate version)		Archive footage	The Bootleg Series Vol. 8: Tell Tale Signs: Rare and Unreleased 1989–2006 (Time Out of Mind outtake)
2009	"Beyond Here Lies Nothin'"	Nash Edgerton	Starring Joel Stoffer and Amanda Aardsma	Together Through Life
2009	"Must Be Santa"	Nash Edgerton	Featuring Tony Garnier, George Receli, Donnie Herron, David Hidalgo, Phil Upchurch and Patrick Warren	Christmas in the Heart
2009	"Little Drummer Boy"	Jeff Scher	Animated rotoscoping over classic cinema scenes	Christmas in the Heart
2010	"Guess I'm Doing Fine"	Jennifer Lebeau	Produced by Jennifer LeBeau	The Bootleg Series Vol. 9: The Witmark Demos: 1962–1964
2012	"Duquesne Whistle"	Nash Edgerton	Featuring Daniel Campos (Cloud (dancer)) and Joel Edgerton	Tempest
2013	"Pretty Saro"	Jennifer Lebeau	Images from the Farm Security Administration stored at the Library of Congress	The Bootleg Series Vol. 10: Another Self Portrait (1969–1971)
2013	"Like a Rolling Stone"	Vania Heymann	16 interactive channels featuring Marc Maron, Drew Carey and The Hawks	Highway 61 Revisited / Bob Dylan: The Complete Album Collection Vol. One
2015	"The Night We Called It a Day"	Nash Edgerton	Featuring Robert Davi and Tracy Phillips	Shadows in the Night
2015	"Visions of Johanna" (take 5, rehearsal)	John Hillcoat	Produced by Jonathan Pavesi and Cinematography by Dimitri Karakatsanis	The Bootleg Series Vol. 12: The Cutting Edge 1965–1966
2015	"Just Like Tom Thumb's Blues" (take 3, rehearsal)	Pennebaker / Dylan	Produced/edited by Damian Rodriguez from Dont Look Back / Eat the Document outtakes	The Bootleg Series Vol. 12: The Cutting Edge 1965–1966
2018	"If You See Her, Say Hello" (take 1)		Lyric video	The Bootleg Series Vol. 14: More Blood, More Tracks
2018	"You're a Big Girl Now" (take 2)		Lyric video	The Bootleg Series Vol. 14: More Blood, More Tracks
2018	"Simple Twist of Fate" (take 1)		Lyric video	The Bootleg Series Vol. 14: More Blood, More Tracks
2018	"You're Gonna Make Me Lonesome When You Go" (take 5)		Lyric video	The Bootleg Series Vol. 14: More Blood, More Tracks
2019	"One More Cup of Coffee (Valley Below)" (S.I.R. Studio Rehearsals, October 21, 1975)		Photo montage	The Rolling Thunder Revue: The 1975 Live Recordings
2019	"Tell Me That It Isn't True" (take 2)		Lyric video	The Bootleg Series Vol. 15: Travelin' Thru, 1967–1969
2019	"Wanted Man" (take 1) w/ Johnny Cash		Archive footage	The Bootleg Series Vol. 15: Travelin' Thru, 1967–1969
2020	"False Prophet"		Lyric video	Rough and Rowdy Ways
2021	"Too Late" (band version)		Lyric video	The Bootleg Series Vol. 16: Springtime in New York 1980–1985
2021	"Don't Fall Apart on Me Tonight" (version 2)	Albert and David Maysles	Feat. Mark Knopfler, Mick Taylor, Sly Dunbar, Robbie Shakespeare and Alan Clark	The Bootleg Series Vol. 16: Springtime in New York 1980–1985
2021	"License to Kill"	Albert and David Maysles	Feat. Mark Knopfler, Mick Taylor, Sly Dunbar, Robbie Shakespeare and Alan Clark	The Bootleg Series Vol. 16: Springtime in New York 1980–1985
2022	"Love Sick" (take 2)		Lyric video	The Bootleg Series Vol. 17: Fragments – Time Out of Mind Sessions (1996–1997)
2023	"Not Dark Yet" (version 1)	Clements Habicht	Magnum Photos slideshow	The Bootleg Series Vol. 17: Fragments – Time Out of Mind Sessions (1996–1997)
2023	"Watching the River Flow"	Alma Har'el	Promo excerpts from Shadow Kingdom: The Early Songs of Bob Dylan	Shadow Kingdom
2023	"Forever Young"	Alma Har'el	Promo excerpts from Shadow Kingdom: The Early Songs of Bob Dylan	Shadow Kingdom
2023	"I Want You" (live in Tokyo, Feb. 28, 1978)		Lyric video	The Complete Budokan 1978
2023	"Going, Going, Gone" (live in Tokyo, Feb 28, 1978)		Lyric video	The Complete Budokan 1978

=== Concert appearances ===
- The Concert for Bangladesh (1972)
- The Last Waltz (1978)
- Live Aid (1985)
- Bob Dylan: The 30th Anniversary Concert Celebration (1993)
- Willie Nelson: The Big Six-0 (1993)
- Woodstock '94 (1995)
- Eric Clapton & Friends In Concert: A Benefit for the Crossroads Centre at Antigua (1999)
- Willie Nelson and Friends – Outlaws & Angels (2004)
- The Rolling Stones: Bridges to Buenos Aires (2019)

=== TV performances ===
- Folk Songs and More Folk Songs (1963) (Westinghouse TV special)
- March on Washington Broadcast (1963)
- Quest: The Times They Are a-Changin' (1964) (Canada, CBC TV special)
- The New Steve Allen Show (a.k.a. The Steve Allen Westinghouse Show) (1964)
- Tonight (1964) (BBC TV)
- Bob Dylan: Elston Gunn Live in Concert (1965) (BBC TV special)
- The Johnny Cash Show (1969) (Episode 1: June 7)
- Soundstage: The World of John Hammond (1975)
- Hard Rain (1976) (TV Special with Joan Baez)
- Saturday Night Live (1979)
- 22nd Annual Grammy Awards (1980)
- Late Night with David Letterman (1984)
- An All-Star Celebration Honoring Martin Luther King Jr. (1986)
- 33rd Annual Grammy Awards (1991)
- Late Night with David Letterman 10th Anniversary Special (1992)
- Late Show with David Letterman (1993)
- Mastercard Masters of Music Concert for the Prince's Trust (1996)
- 40th Annual Grammy Awards (1998)
- 73rd Academy Awards (2001)
- 53rd Annual Grammy Awards (2011)
- Late Show with David Letterman (2015)

=== TV and video documentary appearances ===
- Earl Scruggs: The Bluegrass Legend – Family & Friends (1972)
- USA for Africa: We Are the World: The Video Event (1985)
- Biography: Richard Pryor: Comic on the Edge (1996)
- The True History of the Traveling Wilburys (2007)

== Film ==
=== Director ===
- Eat the Document (also main subject, 1972)
- Renaldo and Clara (also actor, 1978)

=== Actor ===
- BBC Sunday-Night Play: The Madhouse on Castle Street (1963)
- Pat Garrett & Billy the Kid (1973)
- Hearts of Fire (1987)
- Backtrack a.k.a. Catchfire (1990)
- Paradise Cove (1999)
- Masked and Anonymous (2003)
- Rolling Thunder Revue: A Bob Dylan Story by Martin Scorsese (2019)

=== Feature documentaries ===
- Dont Look Back (1967)
- American Masters/Arena: No Direction Home (2005)
- Trouble No More: A Musical Film (2017)

=== Short documentaries ===
- Screen Test: Bob Dylan (1965)
- The Basement Tapes: The Legendary Tale (2014)
- Dylan on 'Dont Look Back' (2015)
- Bob Dylan: Multitudes (2022)

=== Television documentaries ===
- Omnibus: Getting to Dylan (1987)
- Biography: Bob Dylan: The American Troubadour (August 2000)
- 60 Minutes: Bob Dylan: December 5, 2004 (2004)
- Arena: Bob Dylan's Legends (2005)
- Lost Songs: The Basement Tapes Continued (2014)

=== Video documentaries ===
- Dylan Speaks: The Legendary Press Conference in San Francisco (1965)
- Gotta Serve Somebody: The Gospel Songs of Bob Dylan
- 65 Revisited
- Odds and Ends

=== Documentary appearances ===
- The March (1964)
- Festival (1967)
- Johnny Cash! The Man, His World, His Music (1969)
- John & Yoko in Syracuse, New York (1972)
- Runaway America (1982)
- March on Washington: Commemoration of Martin Luther King's '63 March (1983)
- We Are The World: The Story Behind the Song (1985)
- Sun City: Artists United Against Apartheid (1985)
- Great Performances: Celebrating Gershwin: 'S Wonderful (1987)
- A Vision Shared – A Tribute to Woody Guthrie & Leadbelly (voice) (1988)
- Robbie Robertson: Going Home (1995)
- We Are the World: A 10th Anniversary Tribute (1995)
- The History of Rock 'n' Roll (1995)
- Apollo at 70: A Hot Night in Harlem (2004)
- Concert for Bangladesh Revisited with George Harrison and Friends (2005)
- The Legend of Liam Clancy (2006)
- American Masters: Andy Warhol: A Documentary Film (2006)
- Pete Seeger: The Power of Song (2007)
- Tom Petty and the Heartbreakers: Runnin' Down a Dream (2007)
- The Power of Their Song: The Untold Story of Latin America's New Song Movement (2008)
- Patti Smith: Dream of Life (2008)
- Johnny Cash's America (2008)
- American Masters: Joan Baez: How Sweet the Sound (2009)
- The People Speak (2009)
- Phil Ochs: There but for Fortune (2010)
- The March (2013)
- Sweet Blues: A Film About Mike Bloomfield (2013)
- Mavis! (2015)
- Once Were Brothers: Robbie Robertson and the Band (2019)
- Jimmy Carter: Rock & Roll President (2020)
- Born in Chicago (2020)
- Hallelujah: Leonard Cohen, A Journey, A Song (2021)

== Unofficial video releases ==
Note: All these titles are notable for including official Dylan collaborators and are direct-to-video DVD and streaming releases.

=== Highway 61 Entertainment ===
- World Tour 1966: The Home Movies (2003)
- World Tours 1966-1974: Through the Camera of Barry Feinstein (2004)
- 1975–1981: Rolling Thunder and the Gospel Years (2006)
- Inside Bob Dylan's Jesus Years: Busy Being Born... Again! (2008)
- Never Ending Tour Diaries: Drummer Winston Watson's Incredible Journey (2009)
- Bob Dylan Revealed (2011)

=== Chrome Dreams ===
- 1941-1966: Tales from a Golden Age (2004)
- 1966-1978: After the Crash (2006)
- 1978-1989: Both Ends of the Rainbow (2008)
- 1990-2006: The Never Ending Narrative (2011)
- Down in the Flood: Bob Dylan, The Band & The Basement Tapes (2012)
- Roads Rapidly Changing: In & Out of the Folk Revival 1961-1965 (2015)

=== Shoreline Entertainment ===
- The Best of Bob Dylan (2005)

=== Edgehill Publishing/Sandbeach Holdings ===
- Music in Review (2007)
- Change on the Tracks (2008)
- Rock Milestones: Bob Dylan - The Folk Years (2008)

=== Vision Films ===
- The Bob Dylan Phenomenon (2008)

=== Music Video Distributors (MVD) ===
- Bob Dylan's New York (2008)

=== Kobalt Productions ===
- Bob Dylan's Amerika (2018)

=== Entertain Me Productions ===
- Busy Being Born (2020)

== Bibliography ==
- "Album Chart History: Bob Dylan" Billboard 200
- Björner, Olof, "Bob Dylan: Still on the Road: Recording SESSIONS"
- Heylin, Clinton, Bob Dylan: The Recording Sessions 1960–94. Penguin. UK; St Martin's Press, US, 1995. ISBN 0-312-13439-8.
- Krogsgaard, Michael. Positively Bob Dylan: A Thirty Year Discography, Concert, and Recording Session Guide, 1960–1991. Ann Arbor: Popular Culture, Ink., 1991. ISBN 1560750006 (previously published in Europe by Scandinavian Society for Rock Research).
