= Highlands (song) =

Song by Bob Dylan

Song by Bob Dylan

from the album Time Out of Mind
- Released: September 30, 1997
- Recorded: January 1997
- Studio: Criteria Studios (Miami, FL)
- Genre: Country blues; folk rock
- Length: 16:31
- Label: Columbia
- Songwriter: Bob Dylan
- Producer: Daniel Lanois

Time Out of Mind track listing
- 11 tracks: 1. "Love Sick"; 2. "Dirt Road Blues"; 3. "Standing in the Doorway"; 4. "Million Miles"; 5. "Tryin' to Get to Heaven"; 6. "'Til I Fell in Love with You"; 7. "Not Dark Yet"; 8. "Cold Irons Bound"; 9. "Make You Feel My Love"; 10. "Can't Wait"; 11. "Highlands"

"Highlands" is a blues song written and performed by Bob Dylan, and released as the 11th and final track on his 30th studio album Time Out of Mind in 1997. It is Dylan's second longest officially released studio recording at sixteen minutes and thirty-one seconds, surpassed only by "Murder Most Foul", which runs 25 seconds longer. The song was produced by Daniel Lanois.

== Composition and recording ==
The song's lyric is thought to have been inspired by the poem "My Heart's in the Highlands" published in 1790 by Scottish poet Robert Burns, whom Dylan later cited as his greatest influence. In the song's lyrics, Dylan makes references to musician Neil Young and author Erica Jong. The music is based on a simple (E blues) riff, inspired, according to Dylan, by an unnamed Charley Patton record that has yet to be identified. The riff is played the whole way through the song. It has no traditional chorus or bridge.

In session musician Jim Dickinson's account, "I remember, when we finished 'Highlands'—there are two other versions of that, the one that made the record is the rundown, literally, you can hear the beat turn over, which I think Dylan liked. But, anyway, after we finished it, one of the managers came out, and he said, "Well, Bob, have you got a short version of that song?" And Dylan looked at him and said: 'That was the short version'".

== Reception ==
Dylan scholar Kevin Saylor has compared "Highlands" to Dylan's 2020 song "Key West (Philosopher Pirate)", claiming that both take place in a "liminal space": "Dylan, riffing on Robert Burns, says that his heart is in the highlands, a paradisal, otherworldly place (although it is simultaneously described as an actual geographical location), even as his physical body remains in this world while he is alive. He calls the Highlands his home even though he currently is far away ...'Key West' plays a similar role. It is described as 'the place to be', 'fine and fair', 'on the horizon line', 'the place to go', 'the gateway key', 'the enchanted land', 'the land of light', and 'paradise divine'. Clearly, Key West is a place set apart from and superior to all other locales in which the rest of the songs on Rough and Rowdy Ways are set. The singer of 'Key West', released 23 years after 'Highlands', is closer to his final destination than the singer of the earlier song. 'Highlands' ends: 'Well, my heart’s in the Highlands at the break of day / Over the hills and far away / There’s a way to get there and I’ll figure it out somehow / But I’m already there in my mind / And that’s good enough for now'. In the new song, he is already in Key West, the borderline city on the horizon, the place of passage to our ultimate goal".

"Highlands" was named Dylan's 94th best song by Rolling Stone magazine.

Spectrum Culture listed it as one of "Bob Dylan's 20 Best Songs of the '90s.

== Other versions ==
The Bootleg Series Vol. 17: Fragments - Time Out Of Mind Sessions (1996-1997), released on January 27, 2023, contains a version of the original album track remixed by Michael Brauer as well as a studio outtake of the song and a live version from 2001.

== Live performances ==
According to Dylan's official website, he has performed the song live only nine times. A live version of the song was included on the limited edition version of The Best of Bob Dylan, Vol. 2 (2000) and on a Japanese edition of the "Things Have Changed" single. The recording came from a performance in the Santa Cruz Civic Auditorium in Santa Cruz, California on March 16, 2000. A live version of the song performed in New York City on July 27, 1999 was also made available to stream on Dylan's official website in August 1999. Another live version, from March 24, 2001, performed in Newcastle, Australia, is included on The Bootleg Series Vol. 17: Fragments - Time Out Of Mind Sessions (1996-1997). The live debut occurred at Coors Amphitheatre in Chula Vista, California on June 25, 1999 and the last performance (to date) took place at Hearnes Center in Columbia, Missouri on April 2, 2001.

== Cover versions ==
In spite of its extreme length, at least three other artists have recorded "Highlands", two of whom did so when covering Time Out of Mind in its entirety: Guitarist Stephen Michael (recording under the name "Georgia Sam") and Arve-Gunnar Heløy who also translated all of the lyrics into Norwegian. Additionally, Polish band dylan.pl covered the song on their double-CD album Niepotrzebna pogodynka, żeby znać kierunek wiatru (2017) where all of the 29 Dylan covers are translated into and sung in Polish.
