= Tryin' to Get to Heaven =

1997 song by Bob Dylan

Song by Bob Dylan

from the album Time Out of Mind
- Released: September 30, 1997
- Recorded: January 1997
- Studio: Criteria Studios (Miami, FL)
- Length: 5:21
- Label: Columbia
- Songwriter: Bob Dylan
- Producer: Daniel Lanois

Time Out of Mind track listing
- 11 tracks: 1. "Love Sick"; 2. "Dirt Road Blues"; 3. "Standing in the Doorway"; 4. "Million Miles"; 5. "Tryin' to Get to Heaven"; 6. "'Til I Fell in Love with You"; 7. "Not Dark Yet"; 8. "Cold Irons Bound"; 9. "Make You Feel My Love"; 10. "Can't Wait"; 11. "Highlands"

"Tryin' to Get to Heaven" is a song written and performed by the American singer-songwriter Bob Dylan, recorded in January 1997 and released in September that year as the fifth track on his album Time Out of Mind. The recording was produced by Daniel Lanois.

== Composition and recording ==
The song is a medium-tempo folk-rock ballad whose narrator has traveled "all around the world" and, in the song's memorable refrain, is "trying to get to heaven before they close the door". It is notable for being the only song on Time Out of Mind on which Dylan plays the harmonica. In their book Bob Dylan All the Songs: The Story Behind Every Track, authors Philippe Margotin and Jean-Michel Guesdon call the song "hypnotic" and compare its sound to the work of Bruce Springsteen and Phil Spector. They note that Dylan's harmonica solo, which "requires several hearings to appreciate", achieves an unusual "electric" effect because of the way engineer Mark Howard ran it through a distortion box.

== Critical reception ==
Dylan scholar Jochen Markhorst ranks the song among the author's "most beautiful works", noting that it is similar to but "more accessible" than the celebrated "Not Dark Yet" because it offers the "prospect of redemption in an afterlife".

Spectrum Culture included the song on a list of "Bob Dylan's 20 Best Songs of the '90s". In an article accompanying the list, critic David Harris calls it "one of the many triumphs" on Time Out of Mind and notes, "More than anything, 'Tryin' to Get to Heaven' sounds like an aging songwriter taking stock, reliving glories of travel and sexual conquests before he skips off this mortal coil".

A 2021 article in the Irish Independent named it one of the "all-time top 10 tracks by Bob Dylan", noting that, "as Dylan said of one of his own favourites, Neil Young’s 'Only Love Can Break Your Heart', you just want it to go on for ever".

== Other versions ==
The Bootleg Series Vol. 17: Fragments - Time Out Of Mind Sessions (1996-1997), released on January 27, 2023, contains a version of the original album track remixed by Michael Brauer as well as two studio outtakes of the song and a live version from 2000.

== Live performances ==
Between 1999 and 2019, Bob Dylan performed the song 335 times in concert on the Never Ending Tour. A live version from October 5, 2000 in London, done in a jazz arrangement and with a slower tempo, was officially released on The Bootleg Series Vol. 8: Tell Tale Signs: Rare and Unreleased 1989–2006. Another live performance, from a concert in Birmingham, England on September 20, 2000, was included on The Bootleg Series Vol. 17: Fragments – Time Out of Mind Sessions (1996–1997). The live debut occurred in Lisbon, Portugal on April 7, 1999, a performance that was made available to stream on Dylan's official website in August 1999. Another live version, performed in Washington, D.C., on April 4, 2004, was made available to stream on Dylan's site that same month.

== Cover versions ==
Jordan Tice regularly performs the song live.

David Bowie's version, originally recorded in 1998, was officially released as a single on January 8, 2021.

Robyn Hitchcock covered it on his 2004 album Spooked.

Joan Osborne covered it on her 2017 album Songs of Bob Dylan.

Lucinda Williams has officially released two cover versions of the song: one on the Chimes of Freedom compilation album in 2012 and another for her 2020 live album Lu's Jukebox Vol. 3 - Bob's Back Pages: A Night Of Bob Dylan Songs.

Phosphorescent released a cover as a single in December 2022 as part of their "full moon project".
