= The Bootleg Series Vol. 17: Fragments – Time Out of Mind Sessions (1996–1997) =

Compilation album by Bob Dylan
- Released: January 27, 2023
- Recorded: 1996–1997
- Genre: Rock
- Length: 149:46
- Label: Columbia

Bob Dylan chronology
The Bootleg Series Vol. 16: Springtime in New York 1980–1985 (2021)	The Bootleg Series Vol. 17: Fragments – Time Out of Mind Sessions (1996–1997) (2023)	Shadow Kingdom (2023)

Bob Dylan Bootleg Series chronology
Vol. 16: Springtime in New York 1980–1985 (2021)	Vol. 17: Fragments – Time Out of Mind Sessions 1996–1997 (2023)	Vol. 18: Through the Open Window 1956-1963 (2025)

The Bootleg Series Vol. 17: Fragments – Time Out of Mind Sessions (1996–1997) is a compilation album by American singer-songwriter Bob Dylan. The 15th installment in the ongoing Bob Dylan Bootleg Series, it was released by Legacy Records on January 27, 2023. The compilation includes a remix of the original Time Out of Mind album, outtakes, alternate versions and live recordings. The release comes in a two-CD standard edition and a five-disc box set. In addition to the CD releases, a 4-LP and 10-LP were released.

== Reception ==
Professional ratings
Review scores
Source	Rating
AllMusic	3/5 stars
Pitchfork	8.6/10

In Der Spiegel, Max Dax gave a positive review of this album, writing that the new remix unleashes "the full musical power" of Dylan at this stage in his career—he was in his mid 50s at this point and had been making records for 35 years. The editors of AllMusic scored this album three out of five stars, with reviewer Stephen Thomas Erlewine noting that Daniel Lanois' original production on Time Out of Mind had a "murkiness [that] nagged at Dylan" and that the recordings are a chronicle of Dylan attempting to find the right sound for these songs. Pitchfork rated it an 8.6, calling it the Best New Reissue of the week, with reviewer Jayson Greene praising the structure and relevance of the release, noting that this entry in the Bootleg Series both "subverts received knowledge" and "magnifies legends" about Dylan's often-mythologized career and songwriting. Rolling Stone's David Browne gave the album a positive review, writing that the Time Out of Mind sessions deserve the "under-the-microscope treatment".

== Track listing ==
=== Standard edition ===
All tracks are written by Bob Dylan, except where noted.

Disc one – Time Out of Mind (2022 Remix)
No.	Title	Length
1.	"Love Sick" (2022 Remix)	5:21
2.	"Dirt Road Blues" (2022 Remix)	3:34
3.	"Standing in the Doorway" (2022 Remix)	7:41
4.	"Million Miles" (2022 Remix)	5:51
5.	"Tryin' to Get to Heaven" (2022 Remix)	5:22
6.	"'Til I Fell in Love with You" (2022 Remix)	5:15
7.	"Not Dark Yet" (2022 Remix)	6:27
8.	"Cold Irons Bound" (2022 Remix)	7:14
9.	"Make You Feel My Love" (2022 Remix)	3:30
10.	"Can't Wait" (2022 Remix)	5:45
11.	"Highlands" (2022 Remix)	16:31
Total length:		72:31

Disc two – Outtakes and Alternates
No.	Title	Writer(s)	Length
1.	"The Water Is Wide" (8/19/96, Teatro)	Traditional	5:41
2.	"Red River Shore" (Version 1, 9/26/96, Teatro)		6:50
3.	"Dirt Road Blues" (Version 1, 1/12/97 Criteria Studios)		5:29
4.	"Love Sick" (Version 1, 1/14/97, Criteria Studios)		5:12
5.	"Tryin' to Get to Heaven" (Version 2, 1/12/97, Criteria Studios)		5:01
6.	"Make You Feel My Love" (Take 1, 1/5/97, Criteria Studios)		4:10
7.	"Can't Wait" (Version 1, 1/21/97, Criteria Studios)		4:51
8.	"Mississippi" (Version 2, 1/11/97, Criteria Studios)		5:12
9.	"Standing in the Doorway" (Version 1, 1/13/97, Criteria Studios)		7:06
10.	"Not Dark Yet" (Version 1, 1/11/97, Criteria Studios)		7:12
11.	"Cold Irons Bound" (1/9/97, Criteria Studios)		6:07
12.	"Highlands" (1/16/97, Criteria Studios)		14:06
Total length:			76:57

=== Deluxe Edition ===
Disc one – Time Out of Mind (2022 Remix)
No.	Title	Length
Total length:		72:31

Disc two – Outtakes and Alternates
No.	Title	Length
1.	"The Water is Wide"	5:41
2.	"Dreamin' of You"	7:51
3.	"Red River Shore" (Version 1)	6:50
4.	"Love Sick" (Version 1)	5:12
5.	"'Til I Fell In Love With You" (Version 1)	2:57
6.	"Not Dark Yet" (Version 1)	7:12
7.	"Can't Wait" (Version 1)	4:51
8.	"Dirt Road Blues" (Version 1)	5:29
9.	"Mississippi" (Version 1)	6:03
10.	"'Til I Fell In Love With You" (Version 2)	3:54
11.	"Standing In The Doorway" (Version 1)	7:06
12.	"Tryin' To Get To Heaven" (Version 1)	6:55
13.	"Cold Irons Bound"	6:07

Disc three – Outtakes and Alternates
No.	Title	Length
1.	"Love Sick" (Version 2)	6:46
2.	"Dirt Road Blues" (Version 2)	4:17
3.	"Can't Wait" (Version 2)	6:00
4.	"Red River Shore" (Version 2)	7:35
5.	"Marchin' To The City"	4:33
6.	"Make You Feel My Love" (Take 1)	4:10
7.	"Mississippi" (Version 2)	5:12
8.	"Standing in the Doorway" (Version 2)	7:23
9.	"'Til I Fell In Love with You" (Version 3)	6:09
10.	"Not Dark Yet" (Version 2)	5:29
11.	"Tryin' To Get To Heaven" (Version 2)	5:07
12.	"Highlands"	14:06

Disc four – Live (1998–2001)
No.	Title	Length
1.	"Love Sick" (Live in Birmingham, England, June 24, 1998)	5:09
2.	"Can't Wait" (Live in Nashville, Tennessee, February 6, 1999)	6:31
3.	"Standing in the Doorway" (Live in London, England, October 6, 2000)	8:16
4.	"Million Miles" (Live in Atlantic City, New Jersey, January 31, 1998)	5:46
5.	"Tryin' to Get To Heaven" (Live in Birmingham, England, September 20, 2000)	5:42
6.	"'Til I Fell In Love With You" (Live in Buenos Aires, Argentina, April 5, 1998)	5:26
7.	"Not Dark Yet" (Live in Sheffield, England, September 22, 2000)	6:14
8.	"Cold Irons Bound" (Live in Oslo, Norway, May 19, 2000)	6:28
9.	"Make You Feel My Love" (Live in Los Angeles, California, May 21, 1998)	4:07
10.	"Can't Wait" (Live in Oslo, Norway, May 19, 2000)	4:50
11.	"Mississippi" (Live in Washington, D.C., November 15, 2001)	5:43
12.	"Highlands" (Live in Newcastle, Australia, March 24, 2001)	10:10

Disc five – Bonus Disc (Previously Released)
No.	Title	Length
1.	"Dreamin' of You"	5:49
2.	"Red River Shore" (Version 1)	7:33
3.	"Red River Shore" (Version 2)	7:06
4.	"Mississippi" (Version 1)	6:03
5.	"Mississippi" (Version 3)	6:19
6.	"Mississippi" (Version 2)	6:21
7.	"Marchin' to the City" (Version 1)	6:32
8.	"Marchin' to the City" (Version 2)	3:42
9.	"Can't Wait" (Version 1)	5:42
10.	"Can't Wait" (Version 2)	7:26
11.	"Cold Irons Bound" (Live)	5:45
12.	"Tryin' to Get to Heaven" (Live)	5:08

== Charts ==
Weekly chart performance for The Bootleg Series Vol. 17: Fragments – Time Out of Mind Sessions (1996–1997)
Chart (2023)	Peak position
Australian Albums (ARIA)	26
Austrian Albums (Ö3 Austria)	5
Belgian Albums (Ultratop Flanders)	3
Belgian Albums (Ultratop Wallonia)	33
Dutch Albums (Album Top 100)	5
German Albums (Offizielle Top 100)	3
Irish Albums (Official Charts)	15
Italian Albums (FIMI)	55
Japanese Albums (Oricon)	28
Japanese Hot Albums (Billboard Japan)	53
New Zealand Albums (RMNZ)	31
Norwegian Albums (VG-lista)	22
Scottish Albums (Official Charts)	2
Spanish Albums (Promusicae)	21
Swedish Albums (Sverigetopplistan)	5
Swiss Albums (Schweizer Hitparade)	4
UK Albums (Official Charts)	9
US Billboard 200	63
US Top Rock Albums (Billboard)	10

== See also ==
- The Bootleg Series Vol. 8: Tell Tale Signs: Rare and Unreleased 1989–2006 – 2008 compilation that first featured outtakes and demos from the Time Out of Mind sessions
