= Live 1961–2000: Thirty-Nine Years of Great Concert Performances =

Live album by Bob Dylan
- Released: February 28, 2001
- Genre: Rock; folk; country
- Label: SME

Bob Dylan chronology
The Essential Bob Dylan (2000)	Live 1961–2000: Thirty-Nine Years of Great Concert Performances (2001)	Love and Theft (2001)

Live 1961–2000: Thirty-Nine Years of Great Concert Performances is a live compilation album by Bob Dylan, released in Japan on February 28, 2001. It was released in March of that year in the UK.

== Track listing ==
All tracks are written by Bob Dylan, other than tracks 1–3 (traditional) and track 6 (Woody Guthrie).

No.	Title	Source	Length
1.	"Somebody Touched Me" (2000, Portsmouth, England)		2:42
2.	"Wade in the Water" (1961, Minneapolis, Minnesota)		2:59
3.	"Handsome Molly" (1962, The Gaslight Café, New York City, New York)	Live at The Gaslight 1962	2:47
4.	"To Ramona" (1965, Sheffield, England)	outtake from Dont Look Back original soundtrack	4:27
5.	"I Don't Believe You (She Acts Like We Never Have Met)" (1966, Free Trade Hall, Manchester, England)	The Bootleg Series Vol. 4: Bob Dylan Live 1966, The "Royal Albert Hall" Concert	6:00
6.	"Grand Coulee Dam" (1968)	A Tribute to Woody Guthrie, Part 1	2:56
7.	"Knockin' on Heaven's Door" (1974)	Before the Flood (with The Band)	3:49
8.	"It Ain't Me, Babe" (1975)	Renaldo & Clara original soundtrack	5:16
9.	"Shelter from the Storm" (1976)	Hard Rain	5:25
10.	"Dead Man, Dead Man" (1981, New Orleans, Louisiana)	"Everything is Broken" single	3:56
11.	"Slow Train" (1987)	Dylan & The Dead (with The Grateful Dead)	4:59
12.	"Dignity" (1994)	MTV Unplugged	6:35
13.	"Cold Irons Bound" (1997, Los Angeles, California)	"Love Sick" single	6:49
14.	"Born in Time" (February 1, 1998, NJPAC - Newark, NJ)	"Love Sick" single	5:19
15.	"Country Pie" (2000, Portsmouth, England)		2:48
16.	"Things Have Changed" (2000, Portsmouth, England)		5:52
Total length:			72:39
