= The Love that Faded =

Song by Bob Dylan, with lyrics by Hank Williams

Song by Bob Dylan
- Released: 2011
- Recorded: 2011
- Genre: Country
- Songwriter(s): Hank Williams; Bob Dylan

"The Love that Faded" is a song by Bob Dylan. It contains lyrics by Hank Williams to which Dylan composed music, and it appears on the 2011 LP The Lost Notebooks of Hank Williams.

== Background ==
In 2006, a janitor working for Sony/ATV Music Publishing claimed to have found Williams' unfinished lyrics inside a Sony-owned dumpster. The unfinished lyrics were returned to Sony/ATV, which handed them to Bob Dylan in 2008 to complete the songs for an album release. Dylan completed one song; other artists completed others. Dylan's admiration for Williams' work is well documented. When asked about his all-time favorite singer-songwriters in interviews, Williams is nearly always mentioned, and in his autobiography Chronicles: Volume One, Dylan states, "When I hear Hank sing, all movement ceases. The slightest whisper seems sacrilege."

Dylan had recorded and performed several Williams songs before "The Love that Faded":

- He cut "(I Heard That) Lonesome Whistle" during The Freewheelin' Bob Dylan sessions (which appear on the 2012 set The 50th Anniversary Collection)
- In the 1967 film Don't Look Back, he sings "I'm So Lonesome I Could Cry" and "Lost Highway" in a hotel room with Joan Baez looking on.
- During his 1967 retreat in Woodstock with the Band, he recorded "My Bucket's Got a Hole in It," "You Win Again," and "Be Careful of Stones That You Throw," all of which appear on The Bootleg Series Vol. 11: The Basement Tapes Complete.
- "Kaw-Liga" is featured during a New York studio session in the film Renaldo and Clara.
- He cut a version of "I Can't Get You Off of My Mind" for the 2001 LP Timeless: Hank Williams Tribute.
- Dylan has performed "You Win Again" with Willie Nelson onstage several times.
- In the 2005 documentary No Direction Home, archival footage shows him sitting at a piano with a thoroughly wasted Johnny Cash singing "I'm So Lonesome I Could Cry."
