= Standing in the Doorway =

1997 song by Bob Dylan

Song by Bob Dylan

from the album Time Out of Mind
- Released: September 30, 1997
- Recorded: January 1997
- Studio: Criteria Studios (Miami, FL)
- Length: 7:43
- Label: Columbia
- Songwriter: Bob Dylan
- Producer: Daniel Lanois

Time Out of Mind track listing
- 11 tracks: 1. "Love Sick"; 2. "Dirt Road Blues"; 3. "Standing in the Doorway"; 4. "Million Miles"; 5. "Tryin' to Get to Heaven"; 6. "'Til I Fell in Love with You"; 7. "Not Dark Yet"; 8. "Cold Irons Bound"; 9. "Make You Feel My Love"; 10. "Can't Wait"; 11. "Highlands"

"Standing in the Doorway" is a song written and performed by the American singer-songwriter Bob Dylan, recorded in January 1997 and released in September that year as the third track on his album Time Out of Mind. The song was produced by Daniel Lanois.

== Composition and recording ==
"Standing in the Doorway" is a slow-tempo love ballad that has been cited by some critics as one of the highlights of Time Out of Mind. Producer Daniel Lanois suggested to Dylan that they "steal" the feel of Dylan's 1966 recording of "Sad Eyed Lady of the Lowlands" for their arrangement. In the book Bob Dylan All the Songs: The Story Behind Every Track, authors Philippe Margotin and Jean-Michel Guesdon call the song "languorous and ethereal", noting that it's "amazing" that the band for this session, which consisted of a dozen musicians (including two drummers), "does not overload the interpretation". The song is performed in the key of E major.

== Critical reception ==
Writing in Stylus Magazine, critic Ian Mathers describes the song as one in which the narrator laments "at great length the death of his happiness" to the musical accompaniment of a "sweet pedal steel and a churchly organ". Mathers also notes that Dylan "uses the length of the song to slowly work it in, deepening the impact with each verse. It's a gorgeous sounding song, gentle in its sound but never soft, and it's hard not to feel for the singer. He's been denying the hurt for as long as he can, but when it busts down the door it's stronger than ever".

Dylan scholar Tony Attwood writes that "Nowhere has lost love been portrayed so exquisitely", and claims that "If Dylan had written nothing else, he would be worthy of a place in the hall of fame" for this song alone.

Spectrum Culture included the song on a list of "Bob Dylan's 20 Best Songs of the '90s". The Big Issue placed it at #29 on a 2021 list of the "80 best Bob Dylan songs - that aren't the greatest hits" and called it "Haunting. Pretty hopeless. Only for those suffering like a fool...".

Stereogum ran an article to coincide with Dylan's 80th birthday on May 24, 2021 in which 80 musicians were asked to name their favorite Dylan song. Ryley Walker selected "Standing in the Doorway", noting that it "isn't just a mood — it's cyclical lucid dream of loneliness. I've yet to find another six-minute tune about doorways that makes me hope to God I never have to stand in one. And there's a lot of cool songs about doors".

Matt Berninger, lead singer of The National, included it on a playlist of his favorite "tearjerkers". "I don't know how much of this song is autobiographical—I'm sure [Dylan] would say none," Berninger told Rolling Stone in an interview accompanying his list, "But it's impossible not to think there's a lot of honest truth in there".

== Other versions ==
The Bootleg Series Vol. 17: Fragments - Time Out Of Mind Sessions (1996-1997), released on January 27, 2023, contains a version of the original album track remixed by Michael Brauer as well as two studio outtakes of the song and a live version from 1998.

== Live performances ==
Between 2000 and 2017, Bob Dylan performed the song 58 times in concert on the Never Ending Tour. A live version performed in Osaka, Japan on March 6, 2001 was made available to stream on Dylan's official website in October 2001. Dylan also performed the song live at Stage 6, Ray-Art Studios in Canoga Park, California on July 18, 2002 for a concert sequence in the film Masked and Anonymous. The performance was ultimately not included in the film but was made available as a bonus track on DVD and Blu-ray releases. A live performance from a concert in London, England on October 6, 2000 was included on The Bootleg Series Vol. 17: Fragments – Time Out of Mind Sessions (1996–1997). The live debut of the song occurred at the Roseland Theater in Portland, Oregon on June 15, 2000 and the last performance (to date) took place on April 1, 2017 at Stockholm Waterfront in Stockholm, Sweden, a concert immediately following the ceremony where Dylan accepted his Nobel Prize in Literature.

== In popular culture ==
Oscar Isaac sings part of the song live on camera in the 2018 film Life Itself.

Actress/singer Rita Wilson references the song in her 2020 single "I Wanna Kiss Bob Dylan", which includes the lines: "Would his kisses be long like his six minute songs on Time Out of Mind / I want to kiss Bob Dylan / In a doorway standing in the moonlight". She also included it on a Spotify playlist of her favorite romantic Dylan songs.

The song briefly plays in the background of the 2010 Edward Zwick romantic comedy drama Love & Other Drugs, starring Anne Hathaway & Jake Gyllenhaal.

== Notable cover versions ==
Bonnie Raitt covered the song on her 2012 album Slipstream, a recording Dylan later characterized as "astonishing".

Jenny Lewis covered it live in 2019, including a performance that was filmed at Minneapolis radio station KCMP.

Chrissie Hynde covered it for her 2021 album Standing in the Doorway: Chrissie Hynde Sings Bob Dylan, which takes its title from the song.
