= List of awards and nominations received by Bob Dylan =

Bob Dylan awards and nominations
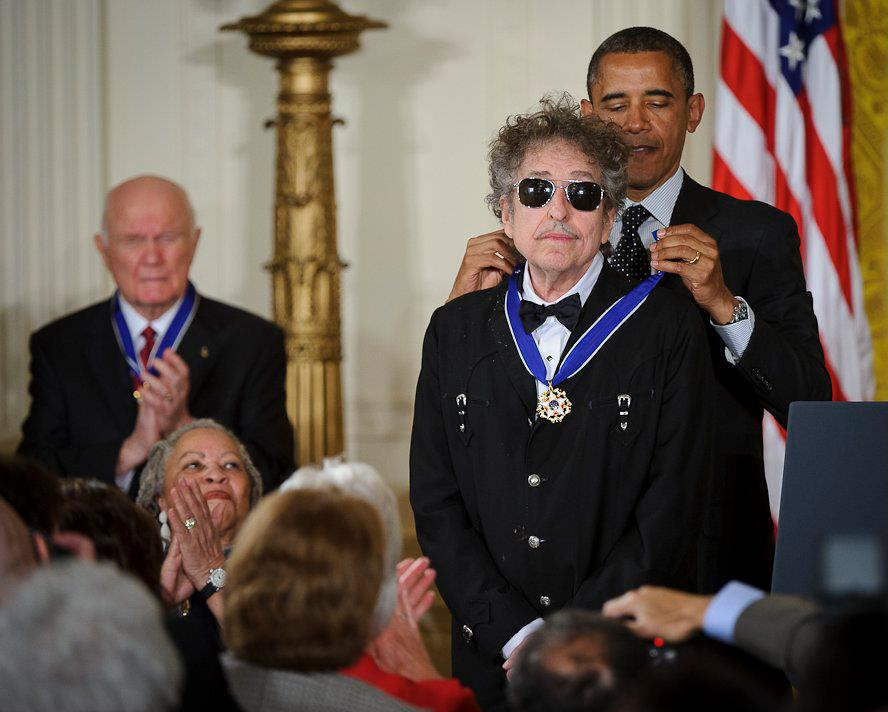
- Dylan with President Barack Obama in 2012
Awards and nominations
Award	Wins	Nominations
Academy Awards	1	1
BAFTA Awards	0	1
Golden Globes	1	1
Grammy Awards	10	38

Totals (Note: Certain award groups do not simply award one winner. They acknowledge several different recipients, have runners-up, and have third place. Since this is a specific recognition and is different from losing an award, runner-up mentions are considered wins in this award tally. For simplification and to avoid errors, each award in this list has been presumed to have had a prior nomination.)
- Wins: 15
- Nominations: 49

Bob Dylan is an American singer-songwriter, author and visual artist. Over his career he has received many accolades throughout his long career as a songwriter and performing artist. Dylan's professional career began in 1961 when he signed with Columbia Records. Fifty-five years later, in 2016, Dylan continued to release new recordings and was the first musician to receive the Nobel Prize in Literature.

Dylan has received 10 competitive Grammy Awards and a Lifetime Achievement Grammy. He received his first Grammy Award nomination for Best Folk Recording for his debut studio album Bob Dylan (1962). Dylan has won two Grammy Awards for Album of the Year for The Concert for Bangladesh (1973) and Time Out of Mind (1997). For his song "Gotta Serve Somebody" in 1980 he won the Grammy Award for Best Male Rock Vocal Performance. He won Grammy Awards for his Folk Albums, World Gone Wrong in 1995, Time Out of Mind (1997), Love and Theft (2001), and Modern Times (2006). For the songs "Cold Irons Bound" (1998) and "Someday Baby" (2006) he won twice for Best Rock Vocal Performance.

On film, he wrote the music and composed the score for the Sam Peckinpah directed revisionist western Pat Garrett and Billy the Kid (1973) for which he was nominated for the BAFTA Award for Best Original Music. Dylan earned acclaim for writing the song "Things Have Changed" for the Curtis Hanson directed comedy-drama film Wonder Boys (2000) for which he earned the Academy Award for Best Original Song and the Golden Globe Award for Best Original Song as well as a nomination for the Grammy Award for Best Song Written for Visual Media.

Throughout his career, Dylan has received various honorary awards including the National Medal of Arts in 2009 and Presidential Medal of Freedom in 2012 both given to him by the 44th president of the United States Barack Obama. He has also been honored with the Grammy Lifetime Achievement Award in 1992, the Kennedy Center Honors in 1997, a Pulitzer Prize Citation in 2008, and a Nobel Prize in Literature in 2016. He was made both an Commandeur des Arts et des Lettres in 1990 and Officier de la Legion d'honneur in 2013. He was inducted in both The Songwriters Hall of Fame in 1982 and The Rock and Roll Hall of Fame in 1988. Five of his songs were listed in as being one of the 500 songs that shaped rock and roll.

== Major associations ==
=== Academy Awards ===
Year	Category	Nominated work	Result	Ref.
2001	Best Original Song	"Things Have Changed" (from Wonder Boys)	Won	

=== BAFTA Awards ===
Year	Category	Nominated work	Result	Ref.
British Academy Film Awards
1973	Best Original Music	Pat Garrett & Billy the Kid	Nominated	

=== Golden Globe Awards ===
Year	Category	Nominated work	Result	Ref.
2001	Best Original Song	"Things Have Changed" (from Wonder Boys)	Won	

=== Grammy Awards ===
Year	Category	Nominated work	Result	Ref.
1963	Best Folk Recording	Bob Dylan	Nominated	
1965	Best Folk Recording	The Times They Are a-Changin'	Nominated	
1969	Best Folk Performance	John Wesley Harding	Nominated	
1970	Best Country Instrumental Performance	"Nashville Skyline Rag"	Nominated	
1973	Album of the Year	The Concert for Bangla Desh	Won	
1974	Best Score Soundtrack for Visual Media	Pat Garrett & Billy the Kid	Nominated	
1980	Best Rock Vocal Performance, Male	"Gotta Serve Somebody"	Won	
1981	Best Inspirational Performance	Saved	Nominated	
1982	Best Inspirational Performance	Shot of Love	Nominated	
1989	Best Traditional Folk Recording	"Pretty Boy Floyd"	Nominated	
1990	Album of the Year	Traveling Wilburys Vol. 1	Nominated	
1990	Best Rock Performance by a Duo or Group with Vocal	Traveling Wilburys Vol. 1	Won	
1992	Best Music Video, Short Form	"Series of Dreams"	Nominated	
1992	Lifetime Achievement Award	Himself	Honored	
1994	Best Rock Vocal Performance, Solo	"All Along the Watchtower"	Nominated	
1994	Best Rock Vocal Performance by a Duo or Group with Vocal	"My Back Pages"	Nominated	
1994	Best Contemporary Folk Album	Good as I Been to You	Nominated	
1995	Best Traditional Folk Album	World Gone Wrong	Won	
1996	Best Male Rock Vocal Performance	"Knockin' on Heaven's Door"	Nominated	
1996	Best Rock Song	"Dignity"	Nominated	
1996	Best Contemporary Folk Album	MTV Unplugged	Nominated	
1998	Album of the Year	Time Out of Mind	Won	
1998	Best Contemporary Folk Album	Time Out of Mind	Won	
1998	Best Rock Vocal Performance, Male	"Cold Irons Bound"	Won	
1999	Best Country Song	"To Make You Feel My Love"	Nominated	
2001	Best Rock Vocal Performance, Male	"Things Have Changed"	Nominated	
2001	Best Song Written for Visual Media	"Things Have Changed"	Nominated	
2002	Album of the Year	Love and Theft	Nominated	
2002	Best Contemporary Folk Album	Love and Theft	Won	
2002	Best Rock Vocal Performance, Male	"Honest with Me"	Nominated	
2004	Best Pop Collaboration with Vocals	"Gonna Change My Way of Thinking"	Nominated	
2004	Best Rock Vocal Performance, Male	"Down in the Flood"	Nominated	
2007	Best Solo Rock Vocal Performance	"Someday Baby"	Won	
2007	Best Rock Song	"Someday Baby"	Nominated	
2007	Best Contemporary Folk/Americana Album	Modern Times	Won	
2010	Best Solo Rock Vocal Performance	"Beyond Here Lies Nothin'"	Nominated	
2010	Best Americana Album	Together Through Life	Nominated	
2016	Best Traditional Pop Vocal Album	Shadows in the Night	Nominated	
2017	Best Traditional Pop Vocal Album	Fallen Angels	Nominated	
2018	Best Traditional Pop Vocal Album	Triplicate	Nominated	
Grammy Hall of Fame
1994	Folk (Single)	"Blowin' in the Wind"	Columbia	
1998	Rock (Single)	"Like a Rolling Stone"	Columbia	
1999	Rock (Album)	Blonde on Blonde	Columbia	
2002	Rock (Track)	"Mr. Tambourine Man"	Columbia	
2002	Rock (Album)	Highway 61 Revisited	Columbia	
2006	Rock (Album)	Bringing It All Back Home	Columbia	
2015	Rock (Album)	Blood on the Tracks	Columbia	
2016	Rock (Album)	The Basement Tapes	Columbia	

== Other awards and nominations ==
Organizations	Year	Category	Nominated work	Result	Ref.
GMA Dove Awards	1980	Album by a Secular Artist	Slow Train Coming	Won	
MVPA Awards	2013	Best Rock Video	"Duquesne Whistle"	Nominated	
mtvU Woodie Awards	2014	Did it My Way Woodie	Himself	Nominated	
Rock and Roll Hall of Fame	1988	500 songs that shaped Rock and Roll	"Blowin' in the Wind"	Honored	
Rock and Roll Hall of Fame	1988	500 songs that shaped Rock and Roll	"The Times They Are a-Changin’"	Honored	
Rock and Roll Hall of Fame	1988	500 songs that shaped Rock and Roll	"Like a Rolling Stone"	Honored	
Rock and Roll Hall of Fame	1988	500 songs that shaped Rock and Roll	"Subterranean Homesick Blues"	Honored	
Rock and Roll Hall of Fame	1988	500 songs that shaped Rock and Roll	"Tangled Up in Blue"	Honored	
Antville Music Video Awards	2013	Best Interactive	"Like a Rolling Stone"	Nominated	
UK Music Video Awards	2014	Best Interactive	"Like a Rolling Stone"	Won	
UK Music Video Awards	2014	Best Art Direction & Design	"Like a Rolling Stone"	Nominated	
UK Music Video Awards	2014	Best Music AD	"Like a Rolling Stone"	Nominated	
Webby Awards	1999	Webby Awards	bobdylan.com	Won	
Webby Awards	2014	Websites - Music	"Like a Rolling Stone"	Nominated	
Webby Awards	2014	Online Film & Video - Best Editing	"Like a Rolling Stone"	Won	
Webby Awards	2014	Online Film & Video - Best Use of Interactive Video	"Like a Rolling Stone"	Nominated	
Webby Awards	2014	Online Film & Video - Music	"Like a Rolling Stone"	Nominated	

== Honorary awards ==
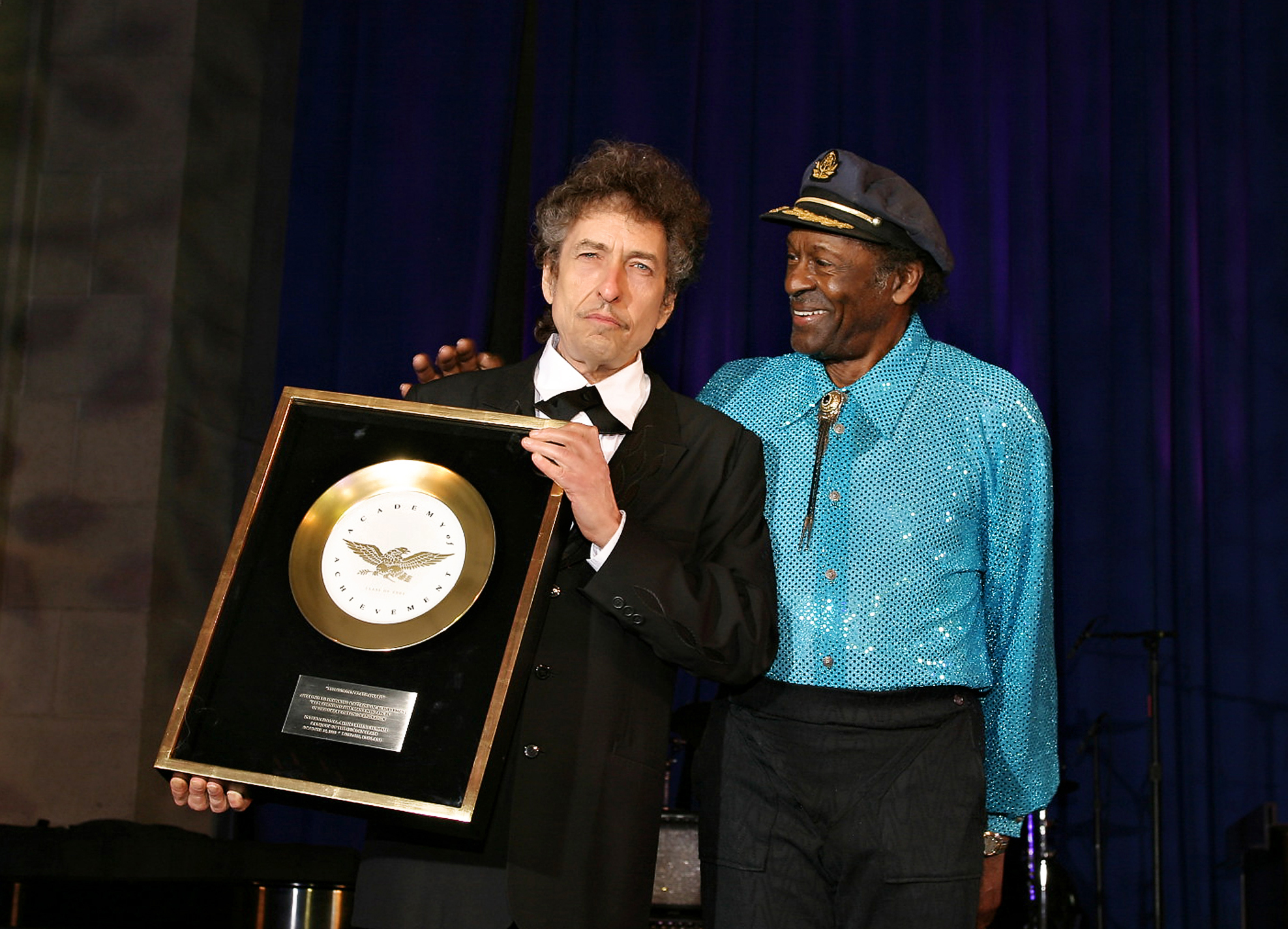
Dylan receiving the Academy of Achievement's Golden Plate Award from Chuck Berry in 2003.

Organization	Year	Honor	Result	Ref.
Nobel Prize Foundation	2016	Nobel Prize in Literature (Note: Dylan received the prize on October 13, 2016, "for having created new poetic expressions within the great American song tradition".It is the first time since 1993 that the Nobel committee has offered the award in the category of American literature.)	Honored	
Tom Paine Foundation	1963	Thomas Paine Award	Honored	
Princeton University	1970	Honorary Doctorate of Music	Honored	
Songwriters Hall of Fame	1982	Inductee	Honored	
French Minister of Culture	1990	Commandeur des Arts et des Lettres	Honored	
The Recording Academy	1992	Grammy Lifetime Achievement Award	Honored	
John F. Kennedy Center for the Performing Arts	1997	Kennedy Center Honors	Honored	
Gish Foundtation	1997	The Dorothy and Lillian Gish Prize	Honored	
Royal Swedish Academy of Music	2000	Polar Music Prize	Honored	
Nashville Songwriters Hall of Fame	2002	Inductee	Honored	
American Academy of Achievement	2003	Golden Plate Award	Honored	
St. Andrews University	2004	Honorary Doctorate of Music	Honored	
Prince of Asturias Awards	2007	Prize	Honored	
Pulitzer Prize	2008	Special Citation	Honored	
President Barack Obama	2009	National Medal of Arts	Honored	
President Barack Obama	2012	Presidential Medal of Freedom	Honored	
Neustadt International Prize	2012	For Literature	finalist	
President François Hollande	2013	Officier de la Legion d'honneur	Honored	
MusiCares Foundation	2015	MusiCares Person of the Year	Honored	
Berklee College of Music	2025	Honorary Doctorate of Music	Honored	
