= Band of the Hand (song) =

Bob Dylan song

- German single cover

Single by Bob Dylan

from the album Band of the Hand Soundtrack
- B-side: "Joe's Death (Michael Rubini instrumental)"
- Released: April 21, 1986
- Recorded: February 9–10, 1986
- Studio: Festival, Sydney, Australia
- Genre: Rock
- Length: 4:34
- Label: MCA
- Songwriter: Bob Dylan
- Producer: Tom Petty

Bob Dylan singles chronology
"When the Night Comes Falling from the Sky" (1986)	"Band of the Hand" (1986)	"Got My Mind Made Up" (1988)

"Band of the Hand" is a song written and recorded by Bob Dylan as the theme for the 1986 movie of the same name, which was directed by Paul Michael Glaser and produced by Michael Mann. Dylan recorded the song while on tour in Sydney, Australia on February 9 and 10, 1986. Dylan is backed on the recording by Tom Petty and the Heartbreakers, and a group of background singers including Stevie Nicks. The recording was produced by Tom Petty.

== Overview ==
The lyrics of the song emphasize the central theme of the movie: the ruthlessness of the vigilante justice that will be used to confront the immorality of the criminal drug world. Although the lyrics posted on Dylan's official website indicate that the refrain for the song consists of the title, "band of the hand," repeated four times in succession, the chorus that is sung on the recording is clearly "It's hell time, man," which is given as the subtitle of the song.

Cash Box said "Great gospel background vocals and tight-but-loose production make this a real send up."

The song was released on the soundtrack album, Band of the Hand (MCA-6167, 1986) and also as both a 45 rpm 7" single (MCA-52811, 1986) and as 12" single (MCA-23633, 1986). Both singles were backed on the B-side by "Joe's Death," an instrumental from the Michael Rubini soundtrack to the film. All three versions of the song are currently out of print, but the soundtrack album is available at iTunes. The version of the song that is heard in the film is slightly longer, and has a different mix than that heard on any of the vinyl releases.

Dylan and Petty would later become members of the Traveling Wilburys.

== Personnel ==
- Bob Dylan (vocal & guitar)
- Tom Petty (vocal & guitar, also producer)
- Mike Campbell (guitar)
- Benmont Tench (keyboards)
- Howie Epstein (bass)
- Stan Lynch (drums)
- Debra Byrd (backing vocals)
- Queen Esther Marrow (backing vocals)
- Stevie Nicks (backing vocals)
- Madelyn Quebec (backing vocals)
- Elisecia Wright (backing vocals)
- recording engineers Don Smith John Harvey Rick O'Neil
