= Johnny Cash! The Man, His World, His Music =

- Directed by: Robert Elfstrom
- Written by: Robert Elfstrom
- Produced by: Arthur Barron; Evelyn Barron; Roy Herkin
- Starring: Johnny Cash; Anita Carter; June Carter Cash; Helen Carter
- Cinematography: Robert Elfstrom
- Edited by: Lawrence Silk
- Music by: Johnny Cash
- Distributed by: Verité Production; WJRZ Radio
- Release dates: March 1969 (U.S. TV); January 23, 1970 (New York City)
- Running time: 94 minutes
- Country: United States
- Language: English

Johnny Cash! The Man, His World, His Music is a 1969 American musical documentary film. The film examines Cash as he visits various locations in 1968, including his hometown of Dyess, Arkansas (in one scene, he plays the song "Busted" on acoustic guitar inside his abandoned childhood home). The film contains no narration, but rather contains audio and video footage of Cash playing in concert and talking with people on tour with him. By this point, Cash was married to June Carter and had been more sober than he had been in years, despite the fact that he still struggled with addiction. The film was released to capitalize on Cash's success by way of his At Folsom Prison album and to promote his upcoming television variety show on ABC.

The film was directed by Rob Elfstrom, with whom Cash would collaborate on his 1973 religious film Gospel Road: A Story of Jesus, which is shot in a similar style, using non-actors and is also filmed on location.

== Cast ==
- Johnny Cash - Himself
- Anita Carter - Herself
- June Carter Cash - Herself (as June Carter)
- Helen Carter - Herself
- Mother Maybelle Carter - Herself
- Bob Dylan - Himself
- Marshall Grant - Himself
- Bob Johnston - Himself
- Merle Kilgore - Himself
- Carl Perkins - Himself
- Bob Wootton - Himself
