= 65 Revisited =

- Film poster
- Directed by: D. A. Pennebaker
- Written by: D. A. Pennebaker
- Starring: Bob Dylan; Joan Baez; Donovan; Alan Price; Albert Grossman; Bob Neuwirth
- Cinematography: D. A. Pennebaker
- Edited by: Walker Lamond
- Music by: Bob Dylan
- Release date: November 28, 2007
- Running time: 65 minutes
- Country: United States
- Language: English

65 Revisited is a 2007 American documentary film directed by D. A. Pennebaker. It was made from footage the director shot for his 1967 film Dont Look Back. Both films show Bob Dylan and entourage during their 1965 concert tour of the UK. The newer film includes outtakes from its predecessor, and adds several full-length song performances.

The film opened in theaters on November 28, 2007. It is also available as the second disc in a DVD reissue called Bob Dylan: Don't Look Back - 65 Tour Deluxe Edition.

65 Revisited also features Joan Baez, Bob Neuwirth and Nico.

== Song performances ==
Songs featured in 65 Revisited are:

- "Don't Think Twice, It's Alright"
- "Wild Mountain Thyme" (a duet with Baez)
- "Love Minus Zero/No Limit"
- "To Ramona"
- "It's All Over Now, Baby Blue"
- "The Lonesome Death of Hattie Carroll"
- "It's Alright, Ma (I'm Only Bleeding)"
- "It Ain't Me Babe"
- "If You Gotta Go, Go Now"
- "She Belongs to Me"
- "It Takes a Lot to Laugh, It Takes a Train to Cry"
- "I'll Keep It with Mine"

== Cue card scene reprise ==
65 Revisited ends with an alternate take on the famous cue card scene from Don't Look Back. This time it's done on a city rooftop rather than in an alley, and producer Tom Wilson appears in place of Allen Ginsberg.
