= Band of the Hand =

1986 film by Paul Michael Glaser

- Theatrical release poster
- Directed by: Paul Michael Glaser
- Written by: Leo Garen; Jack Baran
- Produced by: Michael Rauch
- Starring: Stephen Lang; James Remar
- Cinematography: Reynaldo Villalobos
- Edited by: Jack Hofstra; Russ Kingston
- Music by: Michel Rubini
- Color process: Metrocolor
- Production company: Delphi V Productions
- Distributed by: Tri-Star Pictures
- Release date: April 11, 1986
- Running time: 110 minutes
- Country: United States
- Language: English
- Budget: $8.7 million
- Box office: $4.8 million

Band of the Hand is a 1986 American action crime neo noir thriller film directed by Paul Michael Glaser starring Stephen Lang, Leon Robinson, James Remar, Lauren Holly, and Laurence Fishburne.

The film's score was composed and performed by Michel Rubini and the title track was written and performed by Bob Dylan, backed by Tom Petty and the Heartbreakers.

== Plot ==
A group of five juvenile delinquents in their teens are doomed to be prosecuted as adults for their crimes unless they take part in a new and experimental "program" led by a Vietnam veteran Native American named "Indian Joe" Tegra. The five teens include two rival gang leaders, Ruben Pacheco, the leader of the Home Boys serving a three-year sentence for aggravated assault and armed robbery; Moss Roosevelt, the leader of the 27th Avenue Players, also serving a three-year sentence, for assault and armed robbery; Carlos Aragon, a drug trafficker serving a four-year sentence after being arrested in a police sting; James Lee "J.L." MacEwen, the youngest and most violent of the teenagers, serving a 10-year sentence for manslaughter of his abusive and alcoholic father and various arson charges; and Dorcey Bridger, a car thief serving three-plus years for auto theft and over 15 escape attempts from various juvenile halls.

Forced into the swamps, the teens must learn to survive in the dangerous swamp and how to work together. Upon completion of the program, the group leases a vacant house in a dangerous part of Miami and slowly rebuilds the neighborhood, kicking out the pimps, prostitutes and drug dealers. This offends the former illegal inhabitants of their house, all loyal customers of drug baron Cream. The conflict leads to armed fights, in which Joe is killed. The surviving members of the group take the fight directly to a drug manufacturing facility that is equipped with an M-134 Minigun.

== Cast ==
- Stephen Lang as Joe Tegra
- Michael Carmine as Ruben Julian Pacecho
- Lauren Holly as Nikki
- Leon Robinson as Moss Roosevelt
- John Cameron Mitchell as James Lee MacEwen
- Danny Quinn as Carlos Rene Aragon
- Al Shannon as Dorcey Jon Bridger
- Paul Calderon as Tito
- James Remar as Nestor
- Larry Fishburne as Cream

== Reception ==
On review aggregator website Rotten Tomatoes, the film holds an approval rating of 0%, based on eight reviews.

Critics have described the film as "a poor 1970s vigilante movie produced a decade too late." At the 1986 Stinkers Bad Movie Awards, the film was nominated for Worst Picture but lost to Howard the Duck.
