= I Can't Get You Off of My Mind =

1948 song by Hank Williams

Single by Hank Williams With His Drifting Cowboys
- A-side: "A Mansion on the Hill"
- Published: November 30, 1948 Acuff-Rose Publications
- Released: December 1948
- Recorded: November 6, 1947
- Studio: Castle Studio, Nashville
- Genre: Country, blues
- Length: 2:49
- Label: MGM
- Songwriter: Hank Williams
- Producer: Fred Rose

Hank Williams With His Drifting Cowboys singles chronology
"I Saw the Light" (1948)	"I Can't Get You Off of My Mind" (1948)	"Lovesick Blues" (1949)

"I Can't Get You Off of My Mind" is a song written and recorded by Hank Williams. It appeared as the B-side to his 1948 single "A Mansion on the Hill".

== Background ==
It was recorded on November 6, 1947 at Castle Studio in Nashville. Williams was supported by a group that producer Fred Rose assembled from two Grand Ole Opry bands: Zeke Turner (lead guitar), Jerry Byrd (steel guitar), and Louis Ennis (rhythm guitar) were from Red Foley's band while Chubby Wise (fiddle) was a member of Bill Monroe's band. The song is an up-tempo number in which the narrator describes his infatuation with an unfaithful woman.

Bob Dylan recorded the song for the 2001 album Timeless: Hank Williams Tribute. In his autobiography Chronicles: Volume One Dylan wrote, "The sound of his voice went through me like an electric rod and I managed to get a hold of a few of his 78s - "Baby, We're Really in Love" and "Honky Tonkin'" and "Lost Highway" - and I played them endlessly...You can learn a lot about the structure of songwriting by listening to his records, and I listened to them a lot and had them internalized."

The The also recorded it for their Williams tribute LP Hanky Panky.
