= Cold Irons Bound =

Song by Bob Dylan

from the album Time Out of Mind
- Released: September 30, 1997
- Recorded: January 1997
- Studio: Criteria Studios (Miami, FL)
- Genre: Blues rock
- Length: 7:15
- Label: Columbia
- Songwriter: Bob Dylan
- Producer: Daniel Lanois

Time Out of Mind track listing
- 11 tracks: 1. "Love Sick"; 2. "Dirt Road Blues"; 3. "Standing in the Doorway"; 4. "Million Miles"; 5. "Tryin' to Get to Heaven"; 6. "'Til I Fell in Love with You"; 7. "Not Dark Yet"; 8. "Cold Irons Bound"; 9. "Make You Feel My Love"; 10. "Can't Wait"; 11. "Highlands"

Audio sample
- file; help

"Cold Irons Bound" is a Grammy Award-winning song written by Bob Dylan, recorded in January 1997 and released on September 30, 1997 as the eighth track on his album Time Out of Mind. The song was produced by Daniel Lanois.

== Background and composition ==
Dylan was inspired to write the song in the studio after hearing drummer David Kemper, who had arrived early one day, playing an unusual beat. As Kemper explained in an interview with Uncut:

I heard this disco record with a Cuban beat, and when I got to the studio, I sat back at the drums and I slowed the beat down, and turned it upside down, and I was just playing, and there was nobody there. No one was expected for a half hour. So I was playing this drum beat, and then Bob snuck up behind me and said, "What are you playing?" I said, "Hey Bob, how are you today?" He said, "No, don’t stop, keep playing, what are you playing?" I said, "It’s a beat, I’m just writing it right now". "Don’t stop it. Keep doing it". And he went and got a yellow pad of paper and sat next to the drums, and he just started writing. And he wrote for maybe ten minutes, and then he said, "Will you remember that?" And I said, yeah, I got it. And then he said, all right, everybody come on in, I want to put this down".

Well I got it in my head, and by then everyone had arrived and tuned up. And take one, he stepped up to the microphone, and "I’m beginning to hear voices, and there’s no one around". And I think we did two takes, and then he said, "All right, let’s move on to something else". I remember Daniel Lanois wasn’t happy; he didn’t like it. It was one of his guitar breaking incidents. He said to Tony [Garnier] and I: "The world doesn’t want another two-note melody from Bob". And he smashed a guitar. So I thought, well, there goes my chance of being on this record. Next time I saw Daniel was at the [Grammys] because we had performed that night, and all of a sudden, Male Vocal Performance of the Year, came from that song – the one that Dan was adamant wouldn’t get on the record.

The song is performed in the key of B-flat major.

== Critical reception ==
Dylan performing "Cold Irons Bound" in the film Masked and Anonymous

Oliver Trager describes "Cold Irons Bound" as "biting" with "ricocheting guitar licks, rockabilly drums, distorted organ, and [a] voice floating in a blimp of its own echo", in which "one can still hear, to paraphrase "Visions of Johanna", the ghost of electricity howling from the bones of Dylan's face..." Greil Marcus of The San Francisco Examiner made note of the song's "whiplashed rhythm", while Mick Gold, in a retrospective piece for Rock's Backpages, highlighted the memorability of the track's "musique concrete bluesy clutter", saying "the musical noise is more memorable than the lyrics." AllMusic's Jim Esch said: "Thanks to Daniel Lanois's muddy, echo drenched production, 'Cold Irons Bound' sounds like it was mailed in from another time, decades ago from the midnight blue ether. Dylan's voice is at times overmatched by the thick sonic soup, but all the same, the feel is there, and the feel is gnarly, bluesy. Nasty guitars and drums clatter and shuffle overtop a bass riff while Dylan whips off acerbic couplets". Michael Gray also describes this song in detail:

"There's an interesting tension, too, in "Cold Irons Bound," perhaps more accurately an interesting inappropriateness between, on one side, the grinding electronic blizzard of the music and the cold, aircraft-hangar echo of the voice lamenting its sojourn across a lethal planet - fields turned brown, sky lowering with clouds of blood, winds that can tear you to shreds, mists like quicksand - and on the other side the recurrently stated pursuit of tenderness, in phrases that seem imported from another consciousness...It's decidedly odd to hear, pitched against the scraping Lanois winds half tearing us to shreds, sentiments as obdurately "romantic" as

I found my world, found my world in you

or

Lookin' at you and I'm on my bended knee

or

I tried to love and protect you

and to hear such a defensively bleak, exhausted old voice articulate the thought that

I'm gonna remember forever the joy we've shared."

Spectrum Culture included the song on a list of "Bob Dylan's 20 Best Songs of the '90s". In an article accompanying the list, critic Kevin Korber argued that the song is more interesting for the music, and Lanois' atmospheric production, than for Dylan's lyrics: "'Cold Irons Bound' is the ur-example of what Daniel Lanois could do with Dylan, a collaboration that started back with Oh Mercy but arrived in full form on Time Out of Mind. In contrast to the clear, compressed sounds that Dylan began the decade with, 'Irons' is incredibly murky, an echo-laden blues jam that sounds completely disassociated from this plane of existence. Dylan’s voice, by this point weaker and thornier than it had been at his peak, could have been lost in the studio ether, but it instead sounds haunted, a spectral song from a realm beyond ours".

A 2021 Consequence article ranking Dylan's top 15 albums placed Time Out of Mind seventh and cited "Cold Irons Bound" as the highlight. Critic Matt Melis wrote that it was "an agitated, pining, and paranoid album, and nowhere do those emotions register more tangible than on 'Cold Irons Bound'. Amid driving percussion and echoing dirt-road blues, Dylan fails to square a love and obsession that just can’t be reasoned with. This isn’t a tearful goodbye and gallop off into the sunset; this is a collision course that a desperate and broken man seems powerless to avoid. Like so much of Dylan’s turn-of-the-century work, there’s zero compromise to be found here. The wounds are deep, the pain is unbearable, and any possible consolation is blowin’ in the wind".

The Big Issue placed the Masked and Anonymous version at #46 on a 2021 list of the "80 best Bob Dylan songs - that aren't the greatest hits". An article accompanying the list noted that the "bemusing film Dylan wrote and starred in...delivered some storming live performances, including this version of the Time Out of Mind track".

== Other versions ==
Dylan performed the song in July 2002 for a concert sequence in the film Masked and Anonymous. This version was released on the film's soundtrack album in July 2003. It also appears in video form on the bonus DVD included in the Limited Edition version of Dylan's 2006 album Modern Times. Charlie Sexton, who played on this version of the song, called Dylan's re-arrangement of it "simply amazing". The Bootleg Series Vol. 17: Fragments – Time Out of Mind Sessions (1996–1997), released on January 27, 2023, contains a version of the original album track remixed by Michael Brauer as well as a studio outtake of the song and a live version from 2000.

== Live performances ==
Bob Dylan performed "Cold Irons Bound" 423 times on the Never Ending Tour between 1997 and 2011. A concert version, recorded in Los Angeles on Dec. 16, 1997, appeared on various "Love Sick" single releases in 1998, as well as on the compilation Live 1961-2000: Thirty-Nine Years of Great Concert Performances, released in Japan in 2001. A June 11, 2004 performance, from the Bonnaroo Music Festival, in Manchester, Tennessee, is included on the Deluxe Edition of Tell Tale Signs: Rare and Unreleased 1989–2006 (2008). Another live version, from May 19, 2000, performed in Oslo, Norway, is included on The Bootleg Series Vol. 17: Fragments - Time Out Of Mind Sessions (1996-1997). The live debut occurred at Humphrey Coliseum in Starkville, Mississippi on October 24, 1997 and the last performance (to date) took place at Braehead Arena in Glasgow, Scotland on October 9, 2011.

== In popular culture ==
Dylan's original studio version of the song, as well as a cover by Television's Tom Verlaine, are prominently featured in I'm Not There, Todd Haynes's unconventional 2007 biopic of Dylan.

== Awards ==
- Grammy Award for Best Male Rock Vocal Performance (1998)

== Notable covers ==
"Cold Irons Bound" has been covered by:

- Druha Trava & Peter Rowan: New Freedom Bell (1999)
- Tom Verlaine & The Million Dollar Bashers: I'm Not There (2007)
