= Love Sick (Bob Dylan song) =

- CD Single cover

Single by Bob Dylan

from the album Time Out of Mind
- Released: June 18, 1998
- Recorded: January 1997
- Studio: Criteria (Miami, Florida)
- Genre: Blues; reggae
- Length: 4:02 (radio edit); 5:21 (album version)
- Label: Columbia
- Songwriter: Bob Dylan
- Producer: Daniel Lanois

Bob Dylan singles chronology
| "Not Dark Yet" (1997) | "Love Sick" (1998) | "Things Have Changed" (2000) |

Time Out of Mind track listing
- 11 tracks: 1. "Love Sick"; 2. "Dirt Road Blues"; 3. "Standing in the Doorway"; 4. "Million Miles"; 5. "Tryin' to Get to Heaven"; 6. "'Til I Fell in Love with You"; 7. "Not Dark Yet"; 8. "Cold Irons Bound"; 9. "Make You Feel My Love"; 10. "Can't Wait"; 11. "Highlands"

"Love Sick" is a minor-key love song by American musician and Nobel laureate Bob Dylan. It was recorded in January 1997 and appears as the opening track on his 30th studio album Time Out of Mind (1997). It was released as the second single from the album in June 1998 in multiple CD versions, some of which featured Dylan's live performance of the song at the 1998 Grammy Awards. The song was produced by Daniel Lanois.

== Composition and recording ==
Dylan scholar Tony Attwood characterizes "Love Sick" as the "ultimate, absolute, total, complete lost love song" and "the strangest way ever to start an album – starting with what appears to be the end". Attwood notes that the song's point is revealed in the opening line: "it is the streets that are dead. Not Bob, not his relationship, but the entire world around him. He is walking through nothingness. He has no thoughts".

The song is performed in the key of E minor and Attwood sees the desolate lyrical landscape as being reflected in the descending chord progression of the music: "the chords of E minor and D rock back and forth, and the verse ends with a descent of E minor, D major, B minor, A major – and the descent is a descent in every respect. It feels like the end, with the utter perfection of the accompaniment having its own understated say in the instrumental verse".

== Reception and legacy ==
In their book Bob Dylan All the Songs: The Story Behind Every Track, authors Philippe Margotin and Jean-Michel Guesdon praise the song's "simple but powerfully evocative lyrics: 'I'm walking through streets that are dead.../ And the clouds are weeping'", and state that Dylan's "comeback" was worth the wait. They also compare the sound of his "dark, sepulchral" vocals, which were distorted by producer Daniel Lanois, to a classic horror film, and call the results "mesmerizing".

A 2015 USA Today article ranking "all of Bob Dylan's songs" placed "Love Sick" 15th (out of 359).

Spectrum Culture named it one of "Bob Dylan's 20 Best Songs of the 1990s". In an article accompanying the list, critic Justin Cober-Lake called it a "dark, spacious cut with plenty of patience" that "grows darker with every listen".

The Big Issue placed it at #50 on a 2021 list of the "80 best Bob Dylan songs - that aren't the greatest hits". An article accompanying the list called it a "highlight of recent live shows with savage lyric changes: 'You thrilled me to my heart, and you ripped it all apart'".

In a 2021 essay, Greil Marcus discussed the song in relation to the death-haunted early blues songs that have influenced Dylan throughout his career beginning with some that he recorded on his first album, 1962's Bob Dylan: "'Love Sick', the first song on Time Out of Mind is his own chair, his own version of the blues...As 'Love Sick' grows, grows as it opens up and spreads out as the song plays on Time Out of Mind, but far more so as the song was acted out onstage, you can hear the rhythms of 'See That My Grave Is Kept Clean' inside of it - underpinning the song like a ship moving through it. Other songs appear and disappear, like faces in the portholes of the ship of the hidden song. 'Sometimes I want to take to the road and plunder', says the singer, with 'Kill everybody ever done me wrong' under his breath".

== Other versions ==
The Bootleg Series Vol. 17: Fragments - Time Out Of Mind Sessions (1996-1997), released on January 27, 2023, contains a version of the original album track remixed by Michael Brauer as well as two studio outtakes of the song and a live version from 1998. On November 17, 2022, Dylan released a new lyric video of one of the outtakes, featuring photographs from the Time Out of Mind era and his own handwritten lyrics to the song, to promote the album's release.

== Live performances ==
According to Dylan's website, he has performed the song live over 900 times between 1997 and 2026. The live debut occurred at the Bournemouth International Centre in Bournemouth, England on October 2, 1997, and the most recent performances occurred on the Rough and Rowdy Ways World Wide Tour in 2026.

During Dylan's live televised performance of the song at the 1998 Grammy Awards, Michael Portnoy, who had been hired as a background dancer, spontaneously jumped in between the band and danced shirtless with the words "Soy Bomb" painted on his chest. A video of this performance, with Portnoy edited out, appears on the bonus DVD included in the Limited Edition version of Dylan's 2006 album Modern Times.

Another live version, from June 24, 1998, performed in Birmingham, England, is included on The Bootleg Series Vol. 17: Fragments - Time Out Of Mind Sessions (1996-1997).

A live version performed in Nashville, Tennessee on February 6, 1999, was made available to stream on Bob Dylan's official website in June 1999.

It is the song Dylan has performed live the most from Time Out of Mind and it is his 11th most frequently performed live song ever.

== Commercial use ==
“Love Sick” was used in a 2004 television advertising campaign for Victoria’s Secret, featuring Dylan and Brazilian model Adriana Lima, that was directed by photographer Dominique Issermann and shot on location in Venice, Italy. A remixed version of the song, slightly longer than the version that appeared on Time Out of Mind, was made available for purchase on an EP sold exclusively through Victoria's Secret to coincide with the commercial.

In his memoir Soul Mining: A Musical Life, producer Daniel Lanois wrote approvingly of the ad, "I felt relieved when the ultimate conclusion to our work turned up on television. 'Love Sick' had become the theme to the new Victoria's Secret sexy women's underwear campaign. The penetrating sound of my Goldtop Les Paul and Dylan's Telecaster had reached the masses. I felt it had all been worthwhile - Bob and I had had our hit".

== Notable covers ==
The song has been covered by many artists, including The White Stripes, Ryan Adams, Duke Robillard and Mariachi El Bronx.

== Track listings ==
Love Sick: Dylan Alive! Vol. 1 Japanese double EP:

Disc one

1. "Love Sick" – 5:22
2. "Can't Wait" (Live) – 6:04
3. "Roving Gambler" (Live) – 3:53
4. "Blind Willie McTell" (Live) – 7:00

Disc two

1. "Love Sick" (Live at 1998 Grammy Awards) – 5:29
2. "Cold Irons Bound" (Live) – 6:50
3. "Cocaine Blues" (Live) – 5:43
4. "Born in Time" (Live) – 5:19

CD1 (COL 665997 2):

1. "Love Sick" (Live at 1998 Grammy Awards) – 5:29
2. "Cold Irons Bound" (Live) – 6:50
3. "Cocaine Blues" (Live) – 5:43
4. "Born in Time" (Live) – 5:19

CD2 (COL 665997 5):

1. "Love Sick" – 5:22
2. "Can't Wait" (Live) – 6:04
3. "Roving Gambler" (Live) – 3:53
4. "Blind Willie McTell" (Live) – 7:00

2-track CD (COL 665997 1):

1. "Love Sick" (Live at 1998 Grammy Awards) – 5:29
2. "Cold Irons Bound" (Live) – 6:50

Victoria's Secret Exclusive EP:

1. "She Belongs to Me" – 2:46
2. "Don't Think Twice, It's All Right" – 3:38
3. "To Ramona" – 3:51
4. "Boots of Spanish Leather" – 4:37
5. "It's All Over Now, Baby Blue" – 4:13
6. "Love Sick" (Remix) – 5:24
7. "Make You Feel My Love" – 3:31
8. "Things Have Changed" – 5:08
9. "Sugar Baby" – 6:41

=== Notes ===
- "Love Sick" Grammy version recorded live at the 1998 Grammy Awards, February 25, 1998.
- "Cold Irons Bound" and "Cocaine Blues" recorded live at the El Rey Theatre, Los Angeles, December 16, 1997.
- "Born in Time" recorded live at the Center for the Performing Arts, Newark, New Jersey, February 1, 1998.
- "Can't Wait" recorded live at the El Rey Theatre, Los Angeles, December 20, 1997.
- "Roving Gambler" recorded live at the El Rey Theatre, Los Angeles, December 17, 1997.
- "Blind Willie McTell" recorded live at Jones Beach Music Theater, Wantagh, New York, August 17, 1997.
