= Girl from the North Country (musical) =

Musical by Conor McPherson

- Music: Bob Dylan
- Lyrics: Bob Dylan
- Book: Conor McPherson
- Setting: Duluth, Minnesota, 1934
- Premiere: 8 July 2017: The Old Vic, London
- Productions: 2017 London; 2017 West End; 2018 Off-Broadway; 2019 Toronto; 2019 West End revival 2020 Broadway; 2022 Australia; 2022 UK/Ireland Tour; 2023 US Tour
- Awards: Outer Critics Circle Award for Outstanding New Off-Broadway Musical

Girl from the North Country is a jukebox musical with music and lyrics by Bob Dylan and written by Conor McPherson. It is the second show to use Dylan's music after Twyla Tharp's The Times They Are a-Changin'.

== Production history ==
=== World premiere: The Old Vic and West End (2017–18) ===
The musical made its world premiere at The Old Vic in London running from 8 July to 7 October 2017, directed by McPherson. Following the success of The Old Vic production, it transferred into London's West End at the Noël Coward Theatre from 29 December 2017 for a limited 12-week run until 24 March 2018, with the majority of The Old Vic cast.

=== Off-Broadway (2018) ===
The production made its North American premiere Off-Broadway at The Public Theater in New York from 30 September to 22 December 2018, featuring an American cast.

=== Toronto and West End revival (2019–20) ===
The show, featuring a new cast including Katie Brayben and Anna-Jane Casey, was mounted at the Royal Alexandra Theatre in Toronto from 28 September to 24 November 2019. Following the run in Toronto, the production was revived in the West End at the Gielgud Theatre with the same cast from 10 December 2019, running until 1 February 2020.

=== Broadway (2020–22) ===
Girl from the North Country made its Broadway premiere at the Belasco Theatre, beginning previews on 7 February 2020 and opening on 5 March 2020. The COVID-19 pandemic shuttered Broadway theaters on 12 March 2020; Girl from the North Country resumed performances on 13 October 2021. On 12 January 2022, it was announced the show would play its final performance at the Belasco Theatre on 23 January, with initial plans to reopen at a different Shubert house in the spring. The show subsequently reopened at the Belasco Theatre on 29 April 2022 for a limited engagement set to conclude on 19 June.

Prior to the play's official reopening in 2022, a performance was professionally filmed. Producers Tristan Baker and Charlie Parsons commented, "We feel that now was the right time to capture this incredible production ... This was the right time with the right cast, and everything fell into place perfectly. This story is beautiful and deserves to be seen by audiences all over, even if they can't make it to the theater." PBS broadcast the filmed play on 23 May 2025, as part of its Great Performances series.

=== Australia and New Zealand tour (2022) ===
In Australia and New Zealand, a 2022 touring production starred Lisa McCune, Helen Dallimore, Terence Crawford, Peter Kowitz, Grant Piro, Greg Stone and Peter Carroll.

=== Ireland and UK tour (2022–23) ===
In May 2022, casting was announced for the show's first tour of Ireland and the UK, and on 25 June 2022 the tour opened at the 3Olympia Theatre in Dublin. Writer and director Conor McPherson said, "Collaborating with Bob Dylan has been a unique privilege for me. We have had an amazing journey opening on Broadway and in the West End but I feel particularly excited and moved to finally bring this work to my home town of Dublin and on tour around the UK."

The tour's last venues in 2023 were Norwich Theatre Royal, Leicester Curve, and New Wimbledon Theatre, the final performance 18th March. Critical reception was the same as the production had received on its first opening in 2017.

=== North American tour (2023) ===
In May 2022, it was announced that the Girl From the North Country's North American Tour would launch in Fall of 2023 in Minneapolis, Minnesota at the historic Orpheum Theatre, which Dylan previously owned.

=== London revival (2025) ===
The musical returned to The Old Vic in London (where it originally premiered) for a limited 9 week season from 24 June until 23 August 2025 with the original creative team.

== Plot ==
The setting is on the shores of Lake Superior in Duluth, in the winter of 1934 and America is in the grip of the Great Depression.

The story is narrated by Dr. Walker, physician to the Laine family. Nick Laine is the proprietor of a rundown guesthouse. The bank is threatening to foreclose on the property and he is desperate to find a way to save his family from homelessness. His wife, Elizabeth, is suffering from a form of dementia which propels her from catatonic detachment to childlike, uninhibited outbursts which are becoming difficult to manage. Their children are Gene, who is in his early twenties, and their adopted daughter, Marianne, who is nineteen.

Marianne is five months pregnant and the identity of the father is a mystery she guards carefully. Nick is trying to arrange a marriage between Marianne and a local shoe mender, Mr. Perry, in order to secure her future. The social awkwardness is complicated by the fact that Marianne is a black girl living with a white family. She was abandoned in the guesthouse as a baby and brought up by Nick and Elizabeth.

Gene is unable to get a grip on his life, and veers between ambitions of becoming a writer and debilitating alcohol binges, a situation not helped when his sweetheart, Kate, announces she is marrying a man with better prospects.

Nick has become involved in a relationship with a resident of the guest house, Mrs. Neilsen, a widow who is waiting for her late husband's will to clear probate. They dream of a better future when her money comes through, although she scolds Nick for his constant pessimism.

Also staying at the house are a family, the Burkes. Mr. Burke lost his business in the crash. His wife, Laura, and his son, Elias, share a room upstairs. Elias has a learning disability and the family struggle to come to terms with their reduced state.

Late at night, during a storm, a self-styled clergyman Bible salesman, Marlowe, and a down-on-his-luck boxer, Joe Scott, arrive looking for shelter. The arrival of these characters is a catalyst, changing everything for everyone in the house.

== Musical numbers ==
Twenty-eight songs by Bob Dylan appear throughout the show. Each is backed by instruments from the 1930s.

The Original London Cast Recording was made at Abbey Road in August 2017, and released by Silvertone/Sony Music on CD in September 2017 and double vinyl in December 2017.

The Original Broadway Cast Recording was made on March 9, 2020, at Reservoir Studios in Manhattan, and released by Legacy Recordings/Sony Music in August 2021.

Act I

- "Sign on the Window" – Mrs. Burke, Company
- "Went to See the Gypsy" – Mrs. Neilsen, Company
- "Tight Connection to My Heart (Has Anybody Seen My Love)" – Marianne, Company
- "Slow Train" / "License to Kill" – Reverend Marlowe, Joe, Mrs. Neilsen, Marianne, Company
- "Ballad of a Thin Man" – Orchestra
- "I Want You" – Gene, Kate
- "Blind Willie McTell" – Orchestra
- "Like a Rolling Stone" – Elizabeth, Company
- "Make You Feel My Love" – Mrs. Neilsen, Mrs. Burke, Company
- "Like a Rolling Stone" (Reprise) / "I Want You" (Reprise) – Elizabeth, Company

Act II

- "What Can I Do for You?" – Mr. Burke, Joe, Company
- "You Ain't Goin' Nowhere" – Kate, Company
- "Jokerman" – Marianne, Mrs. Neilsen, Mrs. Burke, Elizabeth, Kate, Company
- "Sweetheart Like You" / "True Love Tends to Forget" – Mrs. Burke, Mrs. Neilsen, Company
- "Lay Down Your Weary Tune" – Orchestra
- "Girl from the North Country" – Company
- "Hurricane"* / "All Along the Watchtower" / "Idiot Wind" – Joe, Marianne, Company
- "Tonight I'll Be Staying Here with You" – Orchestra
- "Duquesne Whistle"** / "Señor (Tales of Yankee Power)" – Elias, Kate, Gene, Company
- "Is Your Love in Vain?" / "License to Kill" (Reprise)" – Mrs. Burke, Mr. Burke, Company
- "Lay, Lady, Lay" / "Jokerman" (Reprise) – Marianne, Mrs. Burke, Kate, Mrs. Neilsen, Company, Orchestra
- "Clair de lune" – Orchestra
- "Forever Young" – Elizabeth, Company
- "Pressing On" – Mrs. Neilsen, Company
- "My Back Pages"† – Orchestra

*Written with Jacques Levy
**Written with Robert Hunter
†Only appears on the Original London Cast Recording and in the original London production

A 25-track, 2-disc collection of songs taken from Bob Dylan's original studio albums, entitled The Music Which Inspired Girl from the North Country: The Original Bob Dylan Recordings, was released in January 2018.

== Reception ==
In a five-star review, The Guardian described it as a "remarkable fusion of text and music", comparing its use of multiple story lines to Arthur Miller's The American Clock, and its narrator to Thornton Wilder's Our Town. "McPherson has created an astonishingly free-flowing production and the 19-strong cast, which includes three musicians, is so uniformly strong it is tough to pick out individuals. (They) use Bob's Dylan's back catalogue to glorious effect."

The Independent said "The idea is inspired and the treatment piercingly beautiful," adding that "Two formidable artists have shown respect for the integrity of each other's work here and the result is magnificent."

The Evening Standard called it "Beguiling and soulful and quietly, exquisitely, heartbreaking. This is, in short, a very special piece of theatre."

The Sunday Express hailed the show as "A tribute and a triumph" and The Times declared it "An instant classic."

The Observer praised the play, calling it "One of the most transporting shows I have seen in years. I came away feeling that Dylan has been writing not a series of songs but an unfolding chronicle."

Variety called it "A loving homage with a neat turn of phrase and a tang in the air. When people sing, it's as if they pop the bonnets of their brains and let us look inside," concluding that "The blend slips down easy: enjoyable and soulful."

On the occasion of the West End transfer, Richard Williams wrote in The Guardian "The great achievement of Girl from the North Country, Conor McPherson's musical based on the work of Bob Dylan, lies in the ability of the writer-director and his musical supervisor, Simon Hale, to find shades of meaning within some of the songs that would surely surprise even Dylan himself, a famously protean interpreter of his own creations."

The Times awarded the play five stars calling it "a show that transports the soul."

A five-star review from the Financial Times said "It's original, beautiful and moving, combining the starkness of Steinbeck with haunting lyricism to create something restless, desperate, hopeful and sad."

The Telegraph's five-star review stated that "Not very often, a piece of theatre comes along that radiates an ineffable magic. Conor McPherson's musical play, which premiered at the Old Vic last year and now transfers to the West End, and which draws on heavily reworked versions of familiar and obscure Bob Dylan songs, is one such show. It's not a perfect piece by any means, but the rare alchemy with which McPherson fuses a dustbowl drama set in Depression-era Minnesota with the keening mysticism of Dylan's back catalogue makes it almost glow."

The Sunday Express awarded the transfer five stars, saying "Bob Dylan's songs are so emotive and intense that they might well have overwhelmed the action. It's greatly to McPherson's credit that Girl From The North Country is such a compelling drama in its own right. McPherson has written a subtle and touching play about small town lives in middle America in the 1930s. The Great Depression has entered the very bones of the drifters and fugitives who end up in Nick's boarding house in Duluth, Minnesota. I hailed this show on its premiere last autumn. This well-deserved transfer should not be missed. It's the most powerful, affecting and original musical in London. And, yes, that includes Hamilton."

Dylan himself praised the show in an interview with historian Douglas Brinkley that was first printed in the New York Times:

Brinkley: It's too bad that just when the play Girl from the North Country, which features your music, was getting rave reviews, production had to shutter because of COVID-19. Have you seen the play or watched the video of it?

Dylan: Sure, I've seen it, and it affected me. I saw it as an anonymous spectator, not as someone who had anything to do with it. I just let it happen. The play had me crying at the end. I can't even say why. When the curtain came down, I was stunned. I really was. Too bad Broadway shut down because I wanted to see it again."

== Cast and characters ==
Character	The Old Vic	West End	Toronto/West End revival	Off-Broadway	Broadway	Ireland/UK tour	Australia/NZ tour	US tour
Character	2017		2019	2018	2020	2022	2022	2023
Marianne Laine	Sheila Atim	Sheila Atim	Gloria Obianyo	Kimber Sprawl	Kimber Sprawl	Justina Kehinde	Zahra Newman	Sharaé Moultrie
Dr. Walker	Ron Cook	Adam James	Ferdy Roberts	Robert Joy	Robert Joy	Chris McHallem	Terence Crawford	Alan Ariano
Mrs. Burke	Bronagh Gallagher	Bronagh Gallagher	Anna Jane Casey	Luba Mason	Luba Mason	Rebecca Thornhill	Helen Dallimore	Jill Van Velzer
Elizabeth Laine	Shirley Henderson	Shirley Henderson	Katie Brayben	Mare Winningham	Mare Winningham	Frances McNamee	Lisa McCune	Jennifer Blood
Nick Laine	Ciarán Hinds	Ciarán Hinds	Donald Sage Mackay	Stephen Bogardus	Jay O. Sanders	Colin Connor	Peter Kowitz	John Schiappa
Kate Draper	Claudia Jolly	Claudia Jolly	Gemma Sutton	Caitlin Houlahan	Caitlin Houlahan	Eve Norris	Elizabeth Hay	Chiara Trentalange
Joe Scott	Arinzé Kene	Arinzé Kene	Shaq Taylor	Sydney James Harcourt	Austin Scott	Joshua C Jackson	Callum Francis	Matt Manuel
Mrs. Neilsen	Debbie Kurup	Debbie Kurup	Rachel John	Jeannette Bayardelle	Jeannette Bayardelle	Keisha Amponsa Banson / Maria Omakinwa	Christina O'Neill	Carla Woods
Mr. Perry	Jim Norton	Karl Johnson	Sidney Kean	Tom Nelis	Tom Nelis	Teddy Kempner	Peter Carroll	Jay Russell
Gene Laine	Sam Reid	Sam Reid	Colin Bates	Colton Ryan	Colton Ryan	Gregor Milne	James Smith	Ben Biggers
Reverend Marlowe	Michael Shaeffer	Tim McMullan	Finbar Lynch	David Pittu	Matt McGrath	Eli James	Grant Piro	Jeremy Webb
Elias Burke	Jack Shalloo	Jack Shalloo	Steffan Harri	Todd Almond	Todd Almond	Ross Carswell	Blake Erickson	Aidan Wharton
Mr. Burke	Stanley Townsend	David Ganly	David Ganly	Marc Kudisch	Marc Kudisch	James Staddon	Greg Stone	David Benoit

=== Notable replacements ===
Broadway (2020–2022)

- Dr. Walker: Anthony Edwards
- Mr. Burke: Craig Bierko

== Awards and nominations ==
=== Original London production ===
Year	Award	Category	Nominee	Result
2017	Evening Standard Theatre Award	Emerging Talent	Sheila Atim	Nominated
2017	Critics' Circle Theatre Award	Most Promising Newcomer	Sheila Atim	Won
2018	Laurence Olivier Award	Best New Musical		Nominated
2018	Laurence Olivier Award	Best Actor in a Musical	Ciarán Hinds	Nominated
2018	Laurence Olivier Award	Best Actress in a Musical	Shirley Henderson	Won
2018	Laurence Olivier Award	Best Actress in a Supporting Role in a Musical	Sheila Atim	Won
2018	Laurence Olivier Award	Outstanding Achievement in Music	Bob Dylan and Simon Hale	Nominated

=== Original Off-Broadway production ===
Year	Award	Category	Nominee	Result
2019	Outer Critics Circle Award	Outstanding New Off-Broadway Musical		Won
2019	Outer Critics Circle Award	Outstanding Book of a Musical	Conor McPherson	Nominated
2019	Outer Critics Circle Award	Outstanding Orchestrations	Simon Hale	Nominated
2019	Outer Critics Circle Award	Outstanding Actress in a Musical	Mare Winningham	Nominated
2019	Off-Broadway Alliance Awards	Best New Musical		Nominated

=== Original Broadway production ===
The show opened on March 5, 2020. One week later, on March 12, 2020, New York City's stay-in-place order came into effect at 5:00pm EDT and all theatres had to shut down due to the COVID-19 pandemic. Some awards, such as the Drama Desk Awards, allowed shows that opened after February 19 to submit for consideration for the 2020-21 awards season instead. The production ultimately resumed performances in October 2021.

Year	Award	Category	Nominee	Result
2020	Drama League Awards	Outstanding Production of a Musical		Nominated
2022	Grammy Awards	Best Musical Theater Album		Nominated
2022	Tony Awards	Best Musical		Nominated
2022	Tony Awards	Best Direction of a Musical	Conor McPherson	Nominated
2022	Tony Awards	Best Book of a Musical	Conor McPherson	Nominated
2022	Tony Awards	Best Actress in a Musical	Mare Winningham	Nominated
2022	Tony Awards	Best Featured Actress in a Musical	Jeannette Bayardelle	Nominated
2022	Tony Awards	Best Sound Design of a Musical	Simon Baker	Nominated
2022	Tony Awards	Best Orchestrations	Simon Hale	Won

== Film adaptation ==
On February 6, 2023, McPherson was set to direct and write the film adaptation with Olivia Colman, Woody Harrelson, Chloe Bailey and Tosin Cole cast as the leads.
