= Springtime in New York: The Bootleg Series, Vol. 16 (1980-1985) =

Compilation album by Bob Dylan
- Released: September 17, 2021
- Recorded: September 18, 1980-March 6, 1985
- Genre: Rock
- Length: 122:00
- Label: Columbia
- Producers: Jeff Rosen; Steve Berkowitz

Bob Dylan chronology
| 1970 (2021) | Springtime in New York: The Bootleg Series, Vol. 16 (1980-1985) (2021) | The Bootleg Series Vol. 17: Fragments – Time Out of Mind Sessions (1996–1997) (2023) |

Bob Dylan Bootleg Series chronology
| Vol. 15: Travelin' Thru, 1967–1969 (2019) | Vol. 16: Springtime in New York 1980–1985 (2021) | Vol. 17: Fragments – Time Out of Mind Sessions (1996–1997) (2023) |

Springtime in New York: The Bootleg Series, Vol. 16 (1980-1985) is a compilation album by American singer-songwriter Bob Dylan. It is the 14th installment in the ongoing Bootleg Series and was released on September 17, 2021, through Legacy Records. Like previous installments in the series, the album comes in a two-CD standard edition and a five-disc deluxe edition. In addition to the CD releases, a 2-LP and 4-LP were released, with the latter coming from Third Man Records.

Springtime in New York contains rehearsals and outtakes from the sessions for Shot of Love (1981), Infidels (1983), and Empire Burlesque (1985). The set received positive reviews from critics, with praise being directed at the performances and stripped-back arrangements. The album reached number 40 in the US and number 6 in the UK.

== Track listing ==
=== Standard edition ===
All tracks are written by Bob Dylan, except "New Danville Girl" written by Dylan and Sam Shepard and "Price of Love" by Don Everly and Phil Everly.

Disc one
| No. | Title | Writer(s) | Length |
|---|---|---|---|
| 1. | "Angelina" (Shot of Love outtake) | | 6:40 |
| 2. | "Need a Woman" (rehearsal) | | 5:15 |
| 3. | "Let's Keep It Between Us" (rehearsal) | | 5:12 |
| 4. | "Price of Love" (Shot of Love outtake) | Don Everly, Phil Everly | 4:15 |
| 5. | "Don't Ever Take Yourself Away" (Shot of Love outtake) | | 4:09 |
| 6. | "Fur Slippers" (Shot of Love outtake) | | 2:48 |
| 7. | "Yes Sir, No Sir" (Shot of Love outtake) | | 2:22 |
| 8. | "Jokerman" (Infidels alternate take) | | 6:12 |
| 9. | "Lord Protect My Child" (Infidels outtake) | | 4:17 |
| 10. | "Blind Willie McTell" (take 5 – Infidels outtake) | | 4:26 |
| 11. | "Don't Fall Apart on Me Tonight" (version 2 – Infidels alternate take) | | 5:28 |
| 12. | "Neighborhood Bully" (Infidels alternate take) | | 4:11 |
| 13. | "Too Late" (band version – Infidels outtake) | | 6:15 |

Disc two
| No. | Title | Length |
|---|---|---|
| 1. | "Foot of Pride" (Infidels outtake) | 5:54 |
| 2. | "Sweetheart Like You" (Infidels alternate take) | 3:41 |
| 3. | "Someone's Got a Hold of My Heart" (Infidels outtake) | 4:34 |
| 4. | "I and I" (Infidels alternate take) | 4:27 |
| 5. | "Tell Me" (Infidels outtake) | 5:01 |
| 6. | "Enough Is Enough" (live at Slane Castle, Ireland) | 4:17 |
| 7. | "Tight Connection to My Heart (Has Anybody Seen My Love)" (Empire Burlesque alternate mix) | 5:13 |
| 8. | "Seeing the Real You at Last" (Empire Burlesque alternate take) | 4:25 |
| 9. | "Emotionally Yours" (Empire Burlesque alternate take) | 3:37 |
| 10. | "Clean Cut Kid" (Empire Burlesque alternate take) | 4:42 |
| 11. | "New Danville Girl" (Empire Burlesque outtake) | 11:52 |
| 12. | "Dark Eyes" (Empire Burlesque alternate take) | 4:57 |

=== Deluxe 5-CD edition ===
All tracks are written by Bob Dylan, except where noted.

Disc one
| No. | Title | Writer(s) | Recorded | Length |
|---|---|---|---|---|
| 1. | "Senor (Tales of Yankee Power)" (rehearsal) | | October 28, 1980 | 3:50 |
| 2. | "To Ramona" (rehearsal) | | October 10, 1980 | 3:46 |
| 3. | "Jesus Met the Woman at the Well" (rehearsal) | Traditional | October 16, 1980 | 3:54 |
| 4. | "Mary of the Wild Moor" (rehearsal) | | October 16, 1980 | 3:31 |
| 5. | "Need a Woman" (rehearsal) | | March 20, 1981 | 5:13 |
| 6. | "A Couple More Years" (rehearsal) | Shel Silverstein, Dennis Locorriere | September 18, 1980 | 2:51 |
| 7. | "Mystery Train" (Shot of Love outtake) | Junior Parker | May 15, 1981 | 4:27 |
| 8. | "This Night Won't Last Forever" (rehearsal) | Bill LaBounty, Roy Freeland | October 9, 1980 | 3:40 |
| 9. | "We Just Disagree" (rehearsal) | Jim Krueger | October 10, 1980 | 2:45 |
| 10. | "Let's Keep It Between Us" (rehearsal) | | September 26, 1980 | 5:15 |
| 11. | "Sweet Caroline" (rehearsal) | Neil Diamond | September 18, 1980 | 4:31 |
| 12. | "Fever" (rehearsal) | Eddie Cooley, Otis Blackwell | October 27, 1980 | 3:36 |
| 13. | "Abraham, Martin and John" (rehearsal) | Dick Holler | October 28, 1980 | 3:08 |

Disc two
| No. | Title | Writer(s) | Recorded | Length |
|---|---|---|---|---|
| 1. | "Angelina" (Shot of Love outtake) | | March 26, 1981 | 6:41 |
| 2. | "Price of Love" (Shot of Love outtake) | Don Everly, Phil Everly | May 1, 1981 | 4:15 |
| 3. | "I Wish It Would Rain" (Shot of Love outtake) | Norman Whitfield, Barrett Strong, Rodger Penzabene | April 1, 1981 | 2:59 |
| 4. | "Let It Be Me" (international 7" single B-side) | Gilbert Bécaud, Mann Curtis, Pierre Delanoë | May 1, 1981 | 4:29 |
| 5. | "Cold, Cold Heart" (Shot of Love outtake) | Hank Williams | April 1, 1981 | 3:24 |
| 6. | "Don't Ever Take Yourself Away" (Shot of Love outtake) | | April 23, 1981 | 4:09 |
| 7. | "Fur Slippers" (Shot of Love outtake) | | April 2, 1981 | 2:49 |
| 8. | "Borrowed Time" (Shot of Love outtake) | | April 1, 1981 | 4:32 |
| 9. | "Is It Worth It?" (Shot of Love outtake) | | April 2, 1981 | 3:46 |
| 10. | "Lenny Bruce" (Shot of Love alternate mix) | | April 30, 1981 (Note: Overdubbed May 14-15, 1981.) | 4:31 |
| 11. | "Yes Sir, No Sir" (Shot of Love outtake) | | April 2, 1981 | 2:22 |

Disc three
| No. | Title | Writer(s) | Recorded | Length |
|---|---|---|---|---|
| 1. | "Jokerman" (Infidels alternate take) | | April 14, 1983 | 6:13 |
| 2. | "Blind Willie McTell" (Infidels outtake) | | April 11, 1983 | 4:26 |
| 3. | "Don't Fall Apart on Me Tonight" (version 1 – Infidels alternate take) | | April 11, 1983 | 7:02 |
| 4. | "Don't Fall Apart on Me Tonight" (version 2 – Infidels alternate take) | | April 12, 1983 | 5:29 |
| 5. | "Neighborhood Bully" (Infidels alternate take) | | April 19, 1983 | 4:11 |
| 6. | "Someone's Got a Hold of My Heart" (Infidels outtake) | | April 26, 1983 | 4:35 |
| 7. | "This Was My Love" (Infidels outtake) | Jim Harbert | April 20, 1983 | 3:55 |
| 8. | "Too Late" (acoustic version – Infidels outtake) | | April 23, 1983 | 5:49 |
| 9. | "Too Late" (band version – Infidels outtake) | | April 23, 1983 | 6:16 |
| 10. | "Foot of Pride" (Infidels outtake) | | April 25, 1983 | 5:54 |

Disc four
| No. | Title | Writer(s) | Recorded | Length |
|---|---|---|---|---|
| 1. | "Clean Cut Kid" (Infidels outtake) | | April 15, 1983 | 5:29 |
| 2. | "Sweetheart Like You" (Infidels alternate take) | | April 18, 1983 | 3:42 |
| 3. | "Baby What You Want Me to Do" (Infidels outtake) | Jimmy Reed | May 2, 1983 | 3:42 |
| 4. | "Tell Me" (Infidels outtake) | | April 21, 1983 | 5:02 |
| 5. | "Angel Flying Too Close to the Ground" (Infidels outtake) | Willie Nelson | May 2, 1983 | 3:30 |
| 6. | "Julius and Ethel" (Infidels outtake) | | April 27, 1983 | 3:35 |
| 7. | "Green, Green Grass of Home" (Infidels outtake) | Curly Putman | May 2, 1983 | 3:45 |
| 8. | "Union Sundown" (Infidels alternate take) | | May 2, 1983 | 6:15 |
| 9. | "Lord Protect My Child" (Infidels outtake) | | May 2, 1983 | 4:18 |
| 10. | "I and I" (Infidels alternate take) | | April 27, 1983 | 4:27 |
| 11. | "Death Is Not the End" (full version – Infidels outtake) | | May 2, 1983 (Note: Overdubbed May 13, 1983.) | 7:08 |

Disc five
| No. | Title | Writer(s) | Recorded | Length |
|---|---|---|---|---|
| 1. | "Enough Is Enough" (live) | | July 8, 1984 (Note: Performed live at Slane Castle, Ireland.) | 4:18 |
| 2. | "License to Kill" (live) | | March 22, 1984 (Note: Performed live on Late Night with David Letterman.) | 4:45 |
| 3. | "I'll Remember You" (Empire Burlesque alternate take) | | January 5, 1985 | 4:11 |
| 4. | "Tight Connection to My Heart (Has Anybody Seen My Love)" (Empire Burlesque alternate mix) | | January 15, 1985 (Note: Overdubbed March 1985.) | 5:14 |
| 5. | "Seeing the Real You at Last" (Empire Burlesque alternate take) | | February 14, 1985 | 4:25 |
| 6. | "Emotionally Yours" (Empire Burlesque alternate take) | | February 12, 1985 | 3:37 |
| 7. | "Clean Cut Kid" (Empire Burlesque alternate take) | | July 26, 1984 | 4:42 |
| 8. | "Straight A's in Love" (Empire Burlesque outtake) | | February 14, 1985 | 3:11 |
| 9. | "When the Night Comes Falling from the Sky" (slow version – Empire Burlesque alternate take) | | February 19, 1985 | 5:15 |
| 10. | "When the Night Comes Falling from the Sky" (fast version – Empire Burlesque alternate take) | | February 19, 1985 | 5:45 |
| 11. | "New Danville Girl" (Empire Burlesque outtake) | Bob Dylan, Sam Shepard | December 6, 1984 | 11:52 |
| 12. | "Dark Eyes" (Empire Burlesque alternate take) | | March 6, 1985 | 4:58 |

== Charts ==
Chart performance for The Bootleg Series Vol. 16: Springtime in New York 1980–1985
| Chart (2021) | Peak position |
|---|---|
| Australian Albums (ARIA) | 20 |
| Austrian Albums (Ö3 Austria) | 1 |
| Belgian Albums (Ultratop Flanders) | 6 |
| Belgian Albums (Ultratop Wallonia) | 13 |
| Danish Albums (Hitlisten) | 19 |
| Dutch Albums (Album Top 100) | 11 |
| Finnish Albums (Suomen virallinen lista) | 46 |
| German Albums (Offizielle Top 100) | 4 |
| Irish Albums (Official Charts) | 10 |
| Italian Albums (FIMI) | 37 |
| New Zealand Albums (RMNZ) | 39 |
| Norwegian Albums (VG-lista) | 7 |
| Portuguese Albums (AFP) | 12 |
| Scottish Albums (Official Charts) | 1 |
| Spanish Albums (Promusicae) | 10 |
| Swedish Albums (Sverigetopplistan) | 5 |
| Swiss Albums (Schweizer Hitparade) | 4 |
| UK Albums (Official Charts) | 6 |
| US Billboard 200 | 40 |
| US Top Rock Albums (Billboard) | 7 |
