= Bob Dylan in the 80s: Volume One =

Bob Dylan in the 80's: Volume One

Studio album by various artists
- Released: March 25, 2014
- Genre: Alternative rock
- Length: 109:12
- Label: ATO
- Producer: Jesse Lauter, Sean O'Brian

Bob Dylan in the 1980s: Volume One, released by ATO Records, was produced by Jesse Lauter (Elvis Perkins, The Low Anthem) and Sean O’Brien (Dawes, PAPA). Bob Dylan In The 1980s: Volume One contains a large cache of Bob Dylan songs that have long gone ignored, covering the period starting with 1980's Saved and ending with 1990's Under the Red Sky (including unreleased material — the “80s Basement Tapes” — and the Traveling Wilburys). Contributors include: Built To Spill, Gene Ween of Ween & Slash, Glen Hansard, Reggie Watts, Bonnie “Prince” Billy, Lucius, Langhorne Slim, Craig Finn of The Hold Steady, Deer Tick, Dawn Landes, Josh Kaufman, Blitzen Trapper, Carl Broemel of My Morning Jacket, Elvis Perkins and more.

== Pencils of Promise ==
Portions of proceeds from album sales will go to the charity, Pencils of Promise. Pencils of Promise is a non-profit organization that builds schools and increases educational opportunities in the developing world. The charity has built more than 150 schools in Asia, Africa and Latin America.

== Critical reception ==
Professional ratings
Aggregate scores
Source	Rating
Metacritic	(70/100)
Review scores
Source	Rating
AllMusic	3.5/5 stars
Robert Christgau	(8/10)
PopMatters	(4/10)
Rolling Stone	3.5/5 stars

The Wall Street Journal said Bob Dylan in the 80s: Volume One was an assembly of likable Dylan songs from his 1980s albums. On the other hand, The New Yorker felt the collection was missing a clear order and was more than a decade's worth of songs, as it included selections from 1990's Under the Red Sky.

== Track listing ==
1. "Got My Mind Made Up" - Langhorne Slim & The Law
2. "Jokerman" - Built to Spill
3. "Brownsville Girl (Reprise)" - Reggie Watts
4. "Sweetheart Like You" - Craig Finn
5. "You Changed My Life"- Ivan & Alyosha
6. "Night After Night" - Deer Tick
7. "Dark Eyes"- Dawn Landes & Bonnie 'Prince' Billy
8. "Waiting To Get Beat" - Tea Leaf Green
9. "Wiggle Wiggle" - Aaron Freeman & Slash
10. "Congratulations" - Elvis Perkins
11. "Covenant Woman"- Hannah Cohen
12. "Every Grain of Sand" - Marco Benevento
13. "Series of Dreams"- Yellowbirds
14. "Unbelievable" - Blitzen Trapper
15. "When the Night Comes Falling From The Sky" - Lucius
16. "Pressing On" - Glen Hansard
17. "Death Is Not The End" - Carl Broemel

== Bonus Tracks ==
1. "Man of Peace" - Spirit Family Reunion
2. "Solid Rock" - Widespread Panic
3. "Silvio" - Grayson Capps
4. "Property of Jesus" - Neal Casal
5. "Lenny Bruce" - The Low Anthem
6. "Handy Dandy" - Jessie Elliot & The Handy Dandy Band
7. "Saving Grace" - Chastity Brown
