= I and I =

I and I may refer to:

- An expression in Rastafari vocabulary
- "I and I" (song), a song by Bob Dylan from Infidels
- "I and I", a song by Bayside from the album The Walking Wounded
- "I and I", a song by Soulfly from Dark Ages
