= I'm Not There (soundtrack) =

2007 soundtrack album by various artists

I'm Not There: Original Soundtrack

Soundtrack album by Various Artists
- Released: October 30, 2007
- Genre: Rock
- Length: 159:20
- Label: Columbia
- Producer: Randall Poster; Jim Dunbar; Todd Haynes

The soundtrack album for the Bob Dylan biopic I'm Not There was released as a double CD on October 30, 2007. It features only one recording by Dylan himself—his previously unreleased recording of the title song "I'm Not There" recorded during The Basement Tapes' sessions in 1967—plus various other artists' recordings of songs written by Dylan. These CDs do not contain the movie sound track. Fragments from less than half of the titles are heard in the film, which features more of Dylan's own recordings. The end credits relay a complete list of music heard in the film.

A four-LP version was also released. It features various characters from the movie holding up the side numbers on cue cards, modeled after the "Subterranean Homesick Blues" scene from Dylan's 1967 film Dont Look Back.

A number of tracks feature backing by a supergroup called The Million Dollar Bashers, featuring Sonic Youth members Lee Ranaldo and Steve Shelley, Wilco guitarist Nels Cline, Television guitarist Tom Verlaine, Dylan bassist Tony Garnier, guitarist Smokey Hormel and keyboardist John Medeski.

== Track listing ==
=== Disc One ===
1. "All Along the Watchtower" – Eddie Vedder and The Million Dollar Bashers
2. "I'm Not There" – Sonic Youth
3. "Goin' to Acapulco" – Jim James and Calexico
4. "Tombstone Blues" – Richie Havens
5. "Ballad of a Thin Man" – Stephen Malkmus and The Million Dollar Bashers
6. "Stuck Inside of Mobile with the Memphis Blues Again" – Cat Power
7. "Pressing On" – John Doe
8. "4th Time Around" – Yo La Tengo and Buckwheat Zydeco
9. "Dark Eyes" – Iron & Wine and Calexico
10. "Highway 61 Revisited" – Karen O and The Million Dollar Bashers
11. "One More Cup of Coffee" – Roger McGuinn and Calexico
12. "The Lonesome Death of Hattie Carroll" – Mason Jennings
13. "Billy 1" – Los Lobos
14. "Simple Twist of Fate" – Jeff Tweedy
15. "Man in the Long Black Coat" – Mark Lanegan
16. "Señor (Tales of Yankee Power)" – Willie Nelson and Calexico

=== Disc Two ===
1. "As I Went Out One Morning" – Mira Billotte
2. "Can't Leave Her Behind" - Stephen Malkmus and Lee Ranaldo
3. "Ring Them Bells" – Sufjan Stevens
4. "Just Like a Woman" – Charlotte Gainsbourg and Calexico
5. "Mama You've Been on My Mind" / "A Fraction of Last Thoughts on Woody Guthrie" – Jack Johnson
6. "I Wanna Be Your Lover" - Yo La Tengo
7. "You Ain't Goin' Nowhere" – Glen Hansard and Markéta Irglová
8. "Can You Please Crawl Out Your Window?" – The Hold Steady
9. "Just Like Tom Thumb's Blues" – Ramblin' Jack Elliott
10. "The Wicked Messenger" – The Black Keys
11. "Cold Irons Bound" – Tom Verlaine & The Million Dollar Bashers
12. "The Times They Are a-Changin'" – Mason Jennings
13. "Maggie's Farm" – Stephen Malkmus & The Million Dollar Bashers
14. "When the Ship Comes In" – Marcus Carl Franklin
15. "The Moonshiner" – Bob Forrest
16. "I Dreamed I Saw St. Augustine" – John Doe
17. "Knockin' on Heaven's Door" – Antony and the Johnsons
18. "I'm Not There" – Bob Dylan and The Band - recording from 1967

=== iTunes bonus tracks ===
1. "Main Title Theme (Billy)" – Calexico
2. "One Too Many Mornings" – Joe Henry
3. "What Kind of Friend Is This" – Lee Ranaldo and Stephen Malkmus
4. "Bunkhouse Theme" – Calexico

== Critical reception ==
Professional ratings
Review scores
Source	Rating
Allmusic	4/5 stars
Pitchfork Media	(8.0/10)
Rolling Stone	3.5/5 stars
Uncut	4/5 stars

John Doe's version of "Pressing On" was ranked #52 by Rolling Stone on their 100 Best Songs of 2007 list, while Sonic Youth's cover of "I'm Not There" was ranked at #83 by Pitchfork Media on their Top 100 Tracks of 2007.

== Notes ==
The song "I'm Not There" was itself written in 1967 during a recording session with The Band known as The Basement Tapes. The song was part of the bootleg copies that circulated amongst Dylan fans for a number of years and when The Basement Tapes were released officially, the song, among others were not included. Because of the source material and that Dylan has never been captured playing the song in concert, the lyrics are something of a mystery.

"Ballad of Hollis Brown," covered by The Stooges, plays while Jude Quinn writes songs, but is not included on the soundtrack.
