= Wiggle Wiggle (Bob Dylan song) =

Song by Bob Dylan

from the album Under the Red Sky
- Released: September 10, 1990
- Recorded: March–April 1990
- Genre: Nursery rhyme
- Length: 2:10
- Label: Columbia
- Songwriter: Bob Dylan
- Producers: Don Was; David Was; Bob Dylan (as "Jack Frost")

"Wiggle Wiggle" is a song by American singer-songwriter Bob Dylan. It is the opening track on his twenty-seventh studio album Under the Red Sky, released on September 10, 1990.

== Background ==
An early version of "Wiggle Wiggle" was first performed live on January 12, 1990 at Toad's Place in New Haven, Connecticut. Biographer Clinton Heylin theorizes that due to Dylan's tendency not to perform material live before its official release, he may not have intended at this time for "Wiggle Wiggle" to appear on a studio album. Heylin describes this early version as "a half-remembered 'cover' of a fifties favorite or two crossbred with every frat song [Dylan] ever knew."

By the time of the song's recording in March, a bridge had been added, which Heylin feels contains lyrics "decidedly at odds with [the track's] earlier hedonistic sentiments." Lyrics continued to be altered, being finalized with a new vocal overdub recorded in April.

Dylan originally intended for Guns N' Roses guitarist Slash to perform a Django Reinhardt-influenced solo on "Wiggle Wiggle". However, upon hearing the song's rough mix, Slash found that only his acoustic rhythm guitar track had been retained, as Dylan felt his solo sounded "too much like Guns N' Roses."

== Legacy ==
Due to its simplistic, nonsensical lyrics and nursery rhyme-like style, "Wiggle Wiggle" has received negative reviews from critics, commonly appearing both on lists of Dylan's worst songs and the worst songs by highly-respected artists. Both Ultimate Classic Rock and Billboard included the song on their lists of the top 10 "weirdest" Bob Dylan songs, with both publications noting its "nursery rhyme cadence".

"Wiggle Wiggle" was covered by Aaron Freeman (better known as Gene Ween) and Slash for the tribute album Bob Dylan in the 80s: Volume One (2014).
