= 1970 (album) =

Box set by Bob Dylan featuring George Harrison
- Released: February 26, 2021
- Length: 3:27:36
- Label: Columbia

Bob Dylan chronology
| Rough and Rowdy Ways (2020) | 1970 (2021) | The Bootleg Series Vol. 16: Springtime in New York 1980–1985 (2021) |

George Harrison chronology
| George Harrison – The Vinyl Collection (2017) | 1970 (2021) | All Things Must Pass (50th anniversary edition) (2021) |

1970 is a box set by the American musician Bob Dylan, featuring contributions from British guitarist and a friend of Dylan, George Harrison of the Beatles. It features various recordings from the Self Portrait and New Morning sessions. Originally planned for a small release with the intent to extend the copyright on the recordings, it was later released worldwide, primarily because of Harrison being on the album.

== Release and reception ==
Professional ratings
Aggregate scores
| Source | Rating |
|---|---|
| Metacritic | 75/100 |
Review scores
| Source | Rating |
| AllMusic | 3.5/5 stars |
| American Songwriter | 4/5 stars |
| Classic Rock | 4/5 stars |
| Exclaim! | 8/10 |
| Flood Magazine | 8/10 |
| Uncut | 3.5/5 stars |

According to the review aggregator Metacritic, 1970 received "generally favorable reviews" based on a weighted average score of 75 out of 100 from 5 critic scores.

Writing for AllMusic, senior critic Stephen Thomas Erlewine wrote that the two are "strolling through their performance with convivial ease; it never seems like they're recording with an eye on a finished record, they're just playing for fun", noting that "most of this collection is devoted to covers and revived older Dylan songs. Not everything was played to completion, some songs were played just for fun", he concludes in his review that there may be "Nothing major, then, but the modest pleasures of 1970 are certainly worthwhile." Classic Rock magazine critic John Aizlewood notes that "For half a century, 1970 has seemed like a less-essential Dylan year. Now we’ve been allowed to hear what really happened, that judgement seems harsh. But the key to Dylan remains unchanged: things are never quite what they seem."

== Track listing ==
Disc one
| No. | Title | Length |
|---|---|---|
| 1. | "I Can't Help But Wonder Where I'm Bound" | 0:36 |
| 2. | "Universal Soldier" (take 1) | 1:02 |
| 3. | "Spanish Is the Loving Tongue" (take 1) | 3:08 |
| 4. | "Went to See the Gypsy" (take 2) | 2:50 |
| 5. | "Went to See the Gypsy" (take 3) | 2:31 |
| 6. | "Woogie Boogie" | 2:03 |
| 7. | "Went to See the Gypsy" (take 4) | 2:38 |
| 8. | "Thirsty Boots" (take 1) | 3:48 |
| 9. | "Little Moses" (take 1) | 1:14 |
| 10. | "Alberta" (take 2) | 2:52 |
| 11. | "Come All You Fair and Tender Ladies" (take 1) | 4:55 |
| 12. | "Things About Comin' My Way" (takes 2 and 3) | 2:31 |
| 13. | "Went to See the Gypsy" (take 6) | 2:27 |
| 14. | "Untitled 1970 Instrumental No. 1" | 2:45 |
| 15. | "Come a Little Bit Closer" (take 2) | 1:17 |
| 16. | "Alberta" (take 5) | 2:52 |
| 17. | "Sign on the Window" (take 2) | 3:21 |
| 18. | "Sign on the Window" (takes 3, 4 and 5) | 1:32 |
| 19. | "If Not for You" (take 1) | 0:51 |
| 20. | "Time Passes Slowly" (rehearsal) | 2:22 |
| 21. | "If Not for You" (take 2) | 3:28 |
| 22. | "If Not for You" (take 3) | 2:52 |
| 23. | "Song to Woody" (take 1) | 3:54 |
| 24. | "Mama, You Been on My Mind" (take 1) | 1:59 |
| 25. | "Yesterday" (take 1) | 2:57 |

Disc two
| No. | Title | Length |
|---|---|---|
| 1. | "Just Like Tom Thumb's Blues" (take 1) | 3:47 |
| 2. | "I Met Him on a Sunday (Ronde-Ronde)" (take 1) | 2:46 |
| 3. | "One Too Many Mornings" (take 1) | 3:15 |
| 4. | "Ghost Riders in the Sky" (take 1) | 2:29 |
| 5. | "Cupid" (take 1) | 3:28 |
| 6. | "All I Have to Do Is Dream" (take 1) | 2:13 |
| 7. | "Gates of Eden" (take 1) | 3:50 |
| 8. | "I Threw It All Away" (take 1) | 2:29 |
| 9. | "I Don't Believe You (She Acts Like We Never Have Met)" (take 1) | 2:36 |
| 10. | "Matchbox" (take 1) | 3:21 |
| 11. | "Your True Love" (take 1) | 1:16 |
| 12. | "Telephone Wire" (take 1) | 1:32 |
| 13. | "Fishing Blues" (take 1) | 0:26 |
| 14. | "Honey, Just Allow Me One More Chance" (take 1) | 1:57 |
| 15. | "Rainy Day Women #12 & 35" (take 1) | 1:08 |
| 16. | "It Ain't Me Babe" | 4:13 |
| 17. | "If Not for You" | 2:19 |
| 18. | "Sign on the Window" (take 1) | 3:29 |
| 19. | "Sign on the Window" (take 2) | 3:35 |
| 20. | "Sign on the Window" (take 3) | 3:17 |
| 21. | "Alligator Man" | 2:54 |
| 22. | "Alligator Man" (rock version) | 2:38 |
| 23. | "Alligator Man" (country version) | 3:06 |
| 24. | "Sarah Jane 1" | 3:06 |
| 25. | "Sign on the Window" | 3:48 |
| 26. | "Sarah Jane 2" | 2:15 |

Disc three
| No. | Title | Length |
|---|---|---|
| 1. | "If Not for You" (take 1) | 2:19 |
| 2. | "If Not for You" (take 2) | 2:32 |
| 3. | "Jamaica Farewell" | 3:59 |
| 4. | "Can't Help Falling in Love" | 3:24 |
| 5. | "Long Black Veil" | 6:40 |
| 6. | "One More Weekend" | 3:21 |
| 7. | "Bring Me Little Water, Susie" (take 1) | 4:35 |
| 8. | "Three Angels" | 2:24 |
| 9. | "Tomorrow Is a Long Time" (take 1) | 3:33 |
| 10. | "Tomorrow is a Long Time" (take 2) | 3:27 |
| 11. | "New Morning" | 3:32 |
| 12. | "Untitled 1970 Instrumental No. 2" | 2:37 |
| 13. | "Went to See the Gypsy" | 3:01 |
| 14. | "Sign on the Window" (stereo mix) | 3:12 |
| 15. | "Winterlude" | 2:12 |
| 16. | "I Forgot to Remember to Forget 1" | 2:07 |
| 17. | "I Forgot to Remember to Forget 2" | 2:22 |
| 18. | "Lily of the West" (take 2) | 3:39 |
| 19. | "Father of Night" (rehearsal) | 1:28 |
| 20. | "Lily of the West" | 3:26 |
| 21. | "If Not for You" (take 1) | 3:11 |
| 22. | "If Not for You" (take 2) | 3:08 |
| 23. | "Day of the Locusts" (take 2) | 3:47 |
| Total length: | | 3:27:36 |

== Charts ==
Chart performance for 1970 – With Special Guest George Harrison
| Chart (2021) | Peak position |
|---|---|
| Austrian Albums (Ö3 Austria) | 8 |
| Belgian Albums (Ultratop Flanders) | 8 |
| Belgian Albums (Ultratop Wallonia) | 45 |
| Dutch Albums (Album Top 100) | 18 |
| French Albums (SNEP) | 156 |
| German Albums (Offizielle Top 100) | 8 |
| Italian Albums (FIMI) | 65 |
| Norwegian Albums (VG-lista) | 33 |
| Scottish Albums (Official Charts) | 2 |
| Spanish Albums (Promusicae) | 14 |
| Swedish Albums (Sverigetopplistan) | 12 |
| Swiss Albums (Schweizer Hitparade) | 11 |
| UK Albums (Official Charts) | 13 |
| US Billboard 200 | 76 |
| US Americana/Folk Albums (Billboard) | 4 |
| US Indie Store Album Sales (Billboard) | 3 |
| US Top Rock Albums (Billboard) | 10 |
