= Sweetheart Like You =

Single by Bob Dylan

from the album Infidels
- B-side: "Union Sundown"
- Released: December 1983
- Recorded: April 18, 1983
- Studio: Power Station, New York City
- Genre: Rock
- Length: 4:31
- Label: Columbia
- Songwriter: Bob Dylan
- Producers: Mark Knopfler; Bob Dylan

Bob Dylan singles chronology
"I and I" (1983)	"Sweetheart Like You" (1983)	"Jokerman" (1984)

"Sweetheart Like You" is a song by Bob Dylan that appeared as the second track of his 1983 album Infidels. The song was recorded on April 18, 1983 and released as a single in December 1983, with "Union Sundown" as its B-Side.

"Sweetheart Like You" peaked at #55 on the Billboard Hot 100 on January 28, 1984, staying on the chart for a total of nine weeks. The song also appeared on the ARIA Charts in Australia, reaching #74.

== Song ==
On its face, the song is about "rediscovering an old lover in sordid surroundings"; however, other interpretations have been made, with The New York Times drawing parallels between the song and American military intervention in Central America, while other sources believe Dylan was targeting the song at the Christian church. Still others have interpreted it as being more personal to Dylan, with his friend, music industry veteran Debbie Gold, serving as his muse.

In 1983, a music video of the song was released, featuring Dylan, Steve Ripley, Charlie Quintana, Clydie King and Carla Olson. It was Dylan's first official music video. The video shows Dylan and his backing band on a bar stage performing after hours while being watched by a female janitor cleaning up the bar. As of 2024, Dylan has never played the song live.

=== Personnel ===
In addition to Dylan, the song features Mark Knopfler and Mick Taylor (who plays the lead guitar solo), Alan Clark on keyboard, Robbie Shakespeare on bass, and Sly Dunbar on drums.

== Reception and legacy ==
In its contemporary review of the single, Cash Box said that it "is a twist on the old 'What’s a nice girl like you' pickup line, only Dylan uses it as a springboard for a monologue full of the singsong surrealism of his greatest work." Cash Box noted that "while the woman in the title could be a grownup version of the subject of 'Like A Rolling Stone,' he treats her with tenderness instead of venom" and particularly praised the line "Steal a little and they throw you in jail/Steal a lot and they make you king."

Rolling Stone listed the song at #75 on its list of 100 Greatest Bob Dylan Songs, also naming the song one of Dylan's greatest songs of the 1980s. The magazine called "Sweetheart Like You" "the sort of love song only Bob Dylan could write." Additionally, the song placed fifth in a Rolling Stone readers' poll of "The 10 Best Bob Dylan Songs of the 1980s".

"Sweetheart Like You" ranked 42nd in a Paste list of "The 42 Best Bob Dylan Songs". In an article accompanying the list, critic Holly Gleason wrote, "Bob Dylan is nobody’s feminist, but with this lean ballad, he offers a truth about the challenges facing those pioneering women in the music business. Believed to be written about his ‘80s/’90s business associate Deborah Gold, the notion of 'you could be known as the most beautiful woman who ever crawled across cut glass to make a deal' rings true for generations of women".

The song has received criticism for the lyric "a woman like you should be at home/That's where you belong". In a 1984 interview, Dylan stated that the line did not come across as he had intended, stating "I could easily have changed that line to make it not so overly, uh, tender, you know? But I think the concept still woulda been the same. You see a fine-lookin' woman walking down the street, you start goin', 'Well, what are you doin' on the street? You're so fine, what do you need all this for?'" In The Cambridge Companion to Bob Dylan, Jonathan Lethem notes that "for most listeners the line will be redeemed by both context and presentation."

Joni Mitchell has cited "Sweetheart Like You" as one of her favorite Dylan songs "for its Damon Runyon style of storytelling", and included it on her "Artist's Choice: Joni Mitchell---music that matters to her" compilation released through Starbucks in 2005.

Amy Ray of the Indigo Girls referred to it in 2021 as her favorite track on Infidels, which she cited as one of her favorite Dylan albums.

== Other versions ==
An alternative take of the song from the Infidels sessions in 1983, with somewhat different lyrics, was included on the 2021 compilation album The Bootleg Series Vol. 16: Springtime in New York 1980–1985.

== Notable covers ==
Judy Collins covered it on her album Judy Collins Sings Bob Dylan Just Like a Woman in 1993.

Rod Stewart covered it on his album A Spanner in the Works in 1995.

Jimmy LaFave covered the song live. A recording from the Austin City Limits tv-show in 1996 was later released on his album Favorites 1992-2001.

Craig Finn from The Hold Steady covered the song on the Dylan tribute album Bob Dylan in the 80s: Volume One in 2014.

The song is featured in Conor McPherson's musical play Girl from the North Country, which premiered at the Old Vic in London in 2017. A performance by Bronagh Gallagher was included on the Original London Cast Recording album, also released in 2017.

Chrissie Hynde covered it on her 2021 album Standing in the Doorway: Chrissie Hynde Sings Bob Dylan.

Guy Davis covered it on his 2009 album Sweetheart Like You.

In 2024, on their box-set 1985, The Waterboys released a stripped-down version from 1985 with Mike Scott on vocals and Karl Wallinger on piano.
