= Gotta Serve Somebody: The Gospel Songs of Bob Dylan =

Compilation album by Various Artists
- Released: 2003
- Genre: Gospel
- Label: Sony/Columbia
- Producer: Jeffrey Gaskill

Gotta Serve Somebody: The Gospel Songs of Bob Dylan is a tribute album independently produced by Jeffrey Gaskill of Burning Rose Productions, Ltd. and released under license on the Sony/Columbia label in 2003. The compilation features traditional and contemporary gospel singers performing songs written by Bob Dylan during his "born again" period (1979–81).

== Background ==
Five songs on the album had originally appeared in Dylan's own performances on his first Christian album, Slow Train Coming, and six songs had appeared on his second, Saved. There are none taken from his third and last album from this period, Shot of Love.

Dylan himself performs on the album in a duet with Mavis Staples of "Gonna Change My Way of Thinking," which Dylan completely re-wrote and prefaced by some humorous banter between the two. He opened 40 concerts with the new alternate version in the USA, Europe, Asia, Australia and Israel between 2009 and 2011.

The album was produced by Joel Moss, while Jeffrey Gaskill served as executive producer.

== Reception ==
Gotta Serve Somebody was Grammy nominated for Best Traditional Soul Gospel Album and also Best Pop Collaboration With Vocals for the Bob Dylan and Mavis Staples duet but neither of the prizes was won. The New York Times called the record "The best African-American covers of Dylan songs since Jimi Hendrix."

== Documentary ==
The companion documentary DVD on Image Entertainment premieres 1980 archival footage of Bob Dylan performing "When He Returns" and features interviews with Dylan musicians: Jim Keltner, Spooner Oldham, Regina McCrary, Fred Tackett, Terry Young, Mona Lisa Young and producer Jerry Wexler.

The documentary DVD, directed by Michael B Borofsky won Gold Medal for Excellence Audience Choice for Best Music Documentary at Park City Film Music Festival.

== Track listing ==
All songs by Bob Dylan, except "Saved," written by Bob Dylan and Tim Drummond. "When You Gonna Wake Up" includes additional lyrics by Lee Williams.

1. "Gotta Serve Somebody" - Shirley Caesar- 5:48
2. "When You Gonna Wake Up" - Lee Williams and the Spiritual QC's - 4:43
3. "I Believe In You" - Dottie Peoples - 5:25
4. "Are You Ready" - The Fairfield Four- 2:34
5. "Solid Rock" - Sounds of Blackness - 4:23
6. "Saving Grace" - Aaron Neville - 4:41
7. "What Can I Do For You?" - Helen Baylor - 4:54
8. "Pressing On" - Chicago Mass Choir - 6:06
9. "Saved" - The Mighty Clouds of Joy - 4:43
10. "When He Returns" - Rance Allen - 5:53
11. "Gonna Change My Way of Thinking" - Bob Dylan & Mavis Staples - 5:17

== See also ==
- List of songs written by Bob Dylan
- List of artists who have covered Bob Dylan songs
