= Real Live =

Live album by Bob Dylan
- Released: November 29, 1984
- Recorded: July 5–8, 1984
- Genre: Folk rock; hard rock
- Length: 50:15
- Label: Columbia
- Producer: Glyn Johns

Bob Dylan chronology
Infidels (1983)	Real Live (1984)	Empire Burlesque (1985)

Professional ratings
Review scores
Source	Rating
Allmusic	3/5 stars
The Encyclopedia of Popular Music	2/5 stars
Robert Christgau	B
Record Mirror	3/5 stars
Rolling Stone	3/5 stars

Real Live is a live album by American singer-songwriter Bob Dylan, released on November 29, 1984, by Columbia Records. Recorded during the artist's 1984 European Tour, most of the album was recorded at Wembley Stadium on 7 July, but "License to Kill" and "Tombstone Blues" come from St James' Park, Newcastle on 5 July, and "I and I" and "Girl from the North Country" were recorded at Slane Castle, Ireland on 8 July.

== Background ==
Produced by Glyn Johns, it features Mick Taylor (formerly of the Rolling Stones) on lead guitar, Ian McLagan (formerly of the Faces) on keyboards, and a guest appearance from Carlos Santana. The performances on Real Live were recorded in support of his successful Infidels album.

== Reception ==
While Infidels was hailed as a "return to musical form" (as described by Kurt Loder in Rolling Stone magazine), critical reception for Real Live was generally mixed. Released in December to capitalize on the Christmas shopping season, Real Live still sold in disappointing numbers, reaching a then-career low of No. 115 in the U.S. and No. 54 in the UK.

In his review for Rolling Stone, Kurt Loder, rating the album 3/5, wrote, "Although cynics may find that Dylan's trademark wheeze is verging on self-parody by this point, his singing is truly spirited throughout. The band he assembled for the tour generally serves him well, if without inspiration...some fans may get a giggle out of the rhythm riff – lifted from Ray Charles' 'I Believe to My Soul' – that graces 'Ballad of a Thin Man'. But 'Highway 61 Revisited' is well done as a rocker and 'Tombstone Blues' with Carlos Santana rolls along with great energy."

In Bob Dylan: The Complete Album Guide, Rolling Stone panned Real Live but recognized the album's heavily revised version of "Tangled Up in Blue" as a "forgotten classic". The feature quoted Dylan as stating: "On Real Live, ['Tangled Up in Blue']'s more like it should have been. The imagery is better".

NJ Arts's Jay Lustig cited "I and I" as the standout track from the album and praised Mick Taylor's "stellar guitar work" on it.

== Track listing ==
All tracks are written by Bob Dylan.

Side one
No.	Title	Length
1.	"Highway 61 Revisited"	5:07
2.	"Maggie's Farm"	4:54
3.	"I and I"	6:00
4.	"License to Kill"	3:26
5.	"It Ain't Me, Babe"	5:17
Total length:		24:44

Side two
No.	Title	Length
1.	"Tangled Up in Blue"	6:54
2.	"Masters of War"	6:35
3.	"Ballad of a Thin Man"	4:17
4.	"Girl from the North Country"	4:25
5.	"Tombstone Blues"	4:32
Total length:		26:43

== Personnel ==
- Bob Dylan – guitar, harmonica, keyboards, vocals

=== Additional musicians ===
- Colin Allen – drums
- Ian McLagan – keyboards
- Carlos Santana – guitar on "Tombstone Blues"
- Gregg Sutton – bass guitar
- Mick Taylor – guitar

=== Production ===
- Glyn Johns – producer
- Genaro Rippo – FOH sound engineer
- Chris Wade-Evans – Monitor sound engineer
- Guido Harari – cover photograph

== Charts ==
Chart performance for Real Live
Chart (1984–1985)	Peak position
New Zealand Albums (RMNZ)	31
Norwegian Albums (VG-lista)	13
Swedish Albums (Sverigetopplistan)	28
UK Albums (OCC)	54
US Billboard 200	115
