= Jokerman (song) =

Single by Bob Dylan

from the album Infidels
- B-side: "Isis" (live version from Renaldo and Clara)
- Released: June 1, 1984
- Recorded: April 14, 1983
- Studio: Power Station, New York City
- Genre: Reggae rock
- Length: 6:12; 4:05 (US single edit)
- Label: Columbia
- Songwriter: Bob Dylan
- Producers: Mark Knopfler; Bob Dylan

Bob Dylan singles chronology
"Sweetheart Like You" (1983)	"Jokerman" (1984)	"Tight Connection to My Heart (Has Anybody Seen My Love)" (1985)

"Jokerman" is a song by Bob Dylan that appeared as the opening track of his 1983 album Infidels. Recorded on April 14, 1983, it was released as a single on June 1, 1984, featuring a live version of "Isis" from the film Renaldo and Clara as its B-side.

In addition to appearing on Infidels, "Jokerman" appeared on several Dylan "Best of" compilations, including Bob Dylan's Greatest Hits Volume 3, The Best of Bob Dylan, The Essential Bob Dylan, and the deluxe version of Dylan.

== Background ==
The song has been noted for its biblical imagery and has also been analyzed as a political metaphor. In a 1984 interview with Kurt Loder for Rolling Stone, Bob Dylan discussed his inspiration behind the song: "Me and another guy have a boat down there [in the Caribbean]. 'Jokerman' kinda came to me in the islands. It's very mystical. The shapes there, and shadows, seem to be so ancient. The song was sorta inspired by these spirits they call jumbis".

On March 27, 1984, a music video was released for "Jokerman", produced by Larry Sloman and directed by George Lois. The video features footage of Dylan lip synching the song during the chorus. The verses are illustrated using photographs of historical figures such as Adolf Hitler, Ronald Reagan, Muhammad Ali and Dylan himself, and paintings by artists such as Hieronymus Bosch, Francisco Goya, and Albrecht Dürer. The lyrics of the song are superimposed over these images.

=== Personnel ===
In addition to Dylan, the song features Mark Knopfler and Mick Taylor on guitar, Alan Clark on the keyboard, Robbie Shakespeare on bass and Sly Dunbar on drums. Percussion performed by Sammy Figueroa was later overdubbed onto the track.

== Reception and legacy ==
As a single, "Jokerman" failed to chart but was critically well-received and continues to have a positive legacy. In its contemporary review of the single, Cash Box said that the reggae rhythm section provides "an infectious, bubbling bottom while [the guitarists] trade rough and sweet licks across the moving Dylan lyric" and that "at his stirring, thought provoking best on this one, Dylan summons the passion and fervor synonymous with his earlier work and delivers an inspiring vocal performance".

The Telegraph named "Jokerman" as Dylan's fourth best song, while Spectrum Culture included the song on a list of "Bob Dylan's 20 Best Songs of the 1980s". In an article accompanying the latter list, critic Ian Maxton called it an "unlikely successor to 'Mr. Tambourine Man'" and "the strongest evidence available that Dylan continued to operate at another level long after fans and critics had marked him as having fallen off".

Rolling Stone readers named the song one of Dylan's best post-1960s songs, with the magazine calling it "a brilliant six-minute tune about a twisted figure", noting the song's biblical imagery. A Rolling Stone critics poll listed "Jokerman" at No. 46 on its list of 100 Greatest Bob Dylan Songs. As a guest writer for Rolling Stone, Chris Martin of Coldplay wrote a tribute to "Jokerman", writing "How can this guy [Dylan] have a song that comes from this other world, and it's still so brilliant?" Rolling Stone also included it on a list of "Bob Dylan's Greatest Songs of the 1980s", calling it "one trippy song", noting that "it rocks harder than most anything else Dylan did in the 1980s" and claiming Dylan's 1984 performance of the song on Late Night with David Letterman to be the "definitive" version.

Rapper Wyclef Jean referred to the song in an interview as "the most incredible piece of literature I ever read" and a point of entry for him into the music of Bob Dylan.

A 2021 Guardian article included it on a list of "80 Bob Dylan songs everyone should know".

Stereogum ran an article to coincide with Dylan's 80th birthday on May 24, 2021, in which 80 musicians were asked to name their favorite Dylan song. Pure Bathing Culture's Daniel Hindman selected it, noting how "the lyrics of 'Jokerman' are these quips of mystic wisdom from a source only Bob is in touch with. It's like he's decoded these buds of knowledge through his 1960s 'isn't it all so fucked up man' vibe, filtered through Mark Knopfler's 1980s roots-pop sensibility. This combination is absolutely perfect for me".

The typeface Jokerman takes its name from the song.

== Other versions ==
Two remixes of the song by Doctor Dread, a reggae remix and a more radically altered dub remix were included on a 12" vinyl "Jokerman / I and I Reggae Remix EP" released on Record Store Day in 2021.

An alternate take of the song from the Infidels sessions in 1983, with somewhat different lyrics, was included on the 2021 compilation album The Bootleg Series Vol. 16: Springtime in New York 1980–1985.

== Live performances ==
Dylan's first live performance of the song, in which he was backed by guitarist J.J. Holiday and the rhythm section from the L.A.-based punk band The Plugz, took place on Late Night with David Letterman, on March 22, 1984. Ian Maxton, writing from the vantage point of 2020, called it "a blistering, righteous version of the song that ranks among his best-ever live performances. The emergence of that performance online is one of the reasons why Infidels has rightfully been re-evaluated in recent years...As good as the album is though – and I'm a partisan – there is a glimpse of something on that Letterman performance that can't help but leave one wondering what it would have been like to see Dylan go Punk".

Dylan used the song to open his show at Woodstock '94, a version he later made available on his official YouTube channel.

According to Dylan's official website, he performed the song over 150 times in total. The last performance to date took place at Brixton Academy in London, England on November 25, 2003.

== Certifications ==
Region	Certification	Certified units/sales
New Zealand (RMNZ)	Gold	15,000^{‡}
^{‡} Sales+streaming figures based on certification alone.

== Notable cover versions ==
- Brazilian Tropicalia singer Caetano Veloso covers the song in luxurious arrangement in the tour for his 1991 album Circuladô, which is documented in the following year's album Circuladô ao Vivo
- Built to Spill for the Dylan tribute album Bob Dylan in the 80s: Volume One in 2014.
- The song is featured in Conor McPherson's musical play Girl from the North Country, which is scored entirely by Bob Dylan songs and had its premiere at the Old Vic in London in 2017. A version sung by the ensemble cast is featured on the Original London Cast Recording album, also released in 2017.
- Vampire Weekend played it live on their 2019 Father of the Bride tour. On May 10, 2019, the band performed the song on Jimmy Kimmel Live! They included a live version of the song on their 2023 album Frog on the Bass Drum Vol 1.
- In 2020, Daniel Romano's Outfit released an album, Daniel Romano's Outfit Do (What Could Have Been) Infidels By Bob Dylan & the Plugz, that covered Infidels in its entirety in the style of Dylan's "Jokerman" performance on Late Night with David Letterman with The Plugz.
- Hawai'ian singer-songwriter John Cruz performed Jokerman to support fundraising for the Playing For Change Foundation's work in creating music school programs for children in developing countries.
