= Under the Red Sky =

Studio album by Bob Dylan
- Released: September 10, 1990
- Recorded: January, March–May 1990
- Studios: Oceanway, Record Plant, The Complex, Sorcerer
- Genre: Rock
- Length: 35:21
- Label: Columbia
- Producers: "Jack Frost" (Bob Dylan); Don Was; David Was

Bob Dylan chronology
Oh Mercy (1989)	Under the Red Sky (1990)	The Bootleg Series Volumes 1–3 (Rare & Unreleased) 1961–1991 (1991)

Bob Dylan studio album chronology
Oh Mercy (1989)	Under the Red Sky (1990)	Good as I Been to You (1992)

Singles from Under the Red Sky
- 1. "Unbelievable" Released: September 1990

Under the Red Sky is the twenty-seventh studio album by American singer-songwriter Bob Dylan. It was released on September 10, 1990, through Columbia Records. The album was produced by Don Was, David Was, and Dylan himself (under the pseudonym Jack Frost).

The album was largely greeted as a disappointing follow-up to 1989's critically acclaimed Oh Mercy. Most of the criticism was directed at the slick sound of rock producer Don Was, as well as a handful of tracks that seem rooted in children's nursery rhymes. It is a rarity in Dylan's catalog for its inclusion of celebrity cameos by Jimmie Vaughan, Slash, Elton John, George Harrison, David Crosby, Stevie Ray Vaughan, and Bruce Hornsby. The album was released to middling sales, peaking at number thirteen in the UK and number thirty-eight in the US.

== Dedication ==
The album is dedicated to "Gabby Goo Goo", now thought to be Desiree Gabrielle Dennis-Dylan, Dylan's daughter by Carolyn Dennis, born on January 31, 1986.

== Recording ==
Four songs from the album, "Handy Dandy", "10,000 Men", "God Knows", and "Cat's in the Well", were recorded in a single session in Los Angeles on January 6, 1990, before Dylan commenced a four-week tour. ("Handy Dandy" subsequently received overdubs.) Dylan biographer Clinton Heylin writes that Dylan finished recording the basic tracks for the album in mid-March 1990, but added new vocals to some tracks the following month, with instrumental overdub sessions extending into May 1990.

Unlike the rest of his discography, the album features guest appearances by established artists, such as Bruce Hornsby, Elton John and George Harrison. Additionally, session musicians like pianist Al Kooper and guitarist Waddy Wachtel appear throughout.

The opener, "Wiggle Wiggle", features Slash. Dylan, said the Guns N' Roses guitarist, "is definitely one of the icons of rock 'n' roll, and he was one of the people my parents used to listen to. But it [working on the album] was just such a bad experience."

"10,000 Men" features Stevie Ray Vaughan and the title track features a "fine guitar solo" by George Harrison. Heylin calls this an "important song", noting that it has been a staple of Dylan's performances.

"Born in Time" and "God Knows" are reworkings of material recorded at the previous year's Oh Mercy sessions. Versions of these songs from the Oh Mercy sessions feature on The Bootleg Series Vol. 8: Tell Tale Signs.

According to producer Don Was, there were two outtakes from the album: "Shirley Temple Doesn't Live Here Anymore" (which Dylan co-wrote with Was and David Weiss) and "Heartland" (which Dylan later sang with Willie Nelson on Nelson's 1993 album Across the Borderline). "Shirley Temple Doesn't Live Here Anymore" was later recorded by Don Was's group Was (Not Was) for their 2008 album Boo! as "Mr. Alice Doesn't Live Here Anymore".

== Reception ==
Professional ratings
Review scores
Source	Rating
AllMusic	2/5 stars
Chicago Tribune	2.5/4 stars
Christgau's Consumer Guide	A−
The Encyclopedia of Popular Music	3/5 stars
Entertainment Weekly	C
Tom Hull	B+
Los Angeles Times	3.5/5 stars
MusicHound Rock	.5/5 stars
Rolling Stone	2/5 stars

Dylan has echoed most critics' complaints, telling Rolling Stone in a 2006 interview that the album's shortcomings resulted from hurried and unfocused recording sessions, due in part to his activity with the Traveling Wilburys at the time. He also claimed that there were too many people working on the album, and that he was very disillusioned with the recording industry during this period of his career.

Dylan critic Patrick Humphries, author of The Complete Guide to the Music of Bob Dylan, was particularly harsh in his assessment of Under the Red Sky, stating the album "was everything Oh Mercy wasn't—sloppily written songs, lazily performed and unimaginatively produced. The first bridge of "2 X 2" ("How much poison did they inhale?") was reminiscent of the menace which pervaded Oh Mercy, but otherwise, where before there had been certainty and sureness, here was confusion and indecision."

Humphries saved his harshest attack for the album's opening song, "Wiggle Wiggle":

Then there's "Wiggle Wiggle": worse than anything Dylan has ever recorded? Maybe not that bad, but certainly up there, jostling for position in that particular part of hell, where the jukebox plays nothing but "Joey" (from Desire) and "Had a Dream About You, Baby" (from Down in the Groove). "Wiggle Wiggle" was the one the critics jumped on, particularly the line "Wiggle wiggle wiggle like a bowl of soup", which was taken as proof positive that Dylan had lost it, definitely, permanently, irrevocably. It was hard to disagree—it is hard to reconcile such a line with the man who wrote "Desolation Row" (from Highway 61 Revisited). Of course, you can't get Hamlet or "Like a Rolling Stone" every time out of the traps, but "Wiggle Wiggle"?

The album did have some critical support, particularly from Robert Christgau of The Village Voice, who wrote: "To my astonishment, I think Under the Red Sky is Dylan's best album in 15 years, a record that may even signal a ridiculously belated if not totally meaningless return to form ... It's fabulistic, biblical ... the tempos are postpunk like it oughta be, with [Kenny] Aronoff's sprints and shuffles grooving ahead like '60s folk-rock never did." And Paul Nelson, writing for Musician, called the album "a deliberately throwaway masterpiece". When the Voice held its Pazz & Jop Critics Poll for 1990, Under the Red Sky placed at number 39.

In the end, album sales were disappointing, peaking at number 38 on the US charts and number 13 in the UK. According to the book Down the Highway: The Life of Bob Dylan, the disappointing record sales of this album made him depressed. On top of that, Dylan's second wife had just signed for divorce in August 1990, although their marriage was completely unknown to both Dylan's fans and the media until the 2001 publication of Down the Highway: The Life of Bob Dylan by Howard Sounes.

== Legacy ==
Dylan continued the style of the album with his recording of the nursery rhyme "This Old Man", which was released on the Disney charity album For Our Children in 1991. For his follow-up album, Good as I Been to You (1992), Dylan went back to his acoustic roots, recording more serious songs.

In 2005, Q included the lead-off track "Wiggle Wiggle" in a list of "Ten Terrible Records by Great Artists". Time placed "Wiggle Wiggle" on the list of The 10 Worst Bob Dylan Songs, noting that it "sounds like the theme song to one of those tripped-out television shows beloved by toddlers and drug users". The song was covered on the 2014 tribute album Bob Dylan in the 80s: Volume One by Slash and Aaron Freeman. Its lyrics were also the namesake for the Danish pop/rock band Big Fat Snake.

== Track listing ==
All tracks are written by Bob Dylan.

Side one
No.	Title	Length
1.	"Wiggle Wiggle"	2:09
2.	"Under the Red Sky"	4:09
3.	"Unbelievable"	4:06
4.	"Born in Time"	3:39
5.	"T.V. Talkin' Song"	3:02
Total length:		17:05

Side two
No.	Title	Length
1.	"10,000 Men"	4:21
2.	"2 × 2"	3:36
3.	"God Knows"	3:02
4.	"Handy Dandy"	4:03
5.	"Cat's in the Well"	3:21
Total length:		18:23

== Personnel ==
- Bob Dylan – acoustic guitar (2, 3, 7), electric guitar (1, 5), piano (6, 8, 9, 10), accordion (2, 4, 9, 10), harmonica (3), vocals (all tracks), production

Additional musicians

- Kenny Aronoff – drums (all tracks)
- Sweet Pea Atkinson – backing vocals (9)
- Rayse Biggs – trumpet (10)
- Sir Harry Bowens – backing vocals (9)
- David Crosby – backing vocals (4, 7)
- Paulinho Da Costa – percussion (4, 7, 8, 9)
- George Harrison – slide guitar (2)
- Bruce Hornsby - piano (4, 5)
- Elton John – piano (7)
- Slash – guitar (1)
- Waddy Wachtel - guitar (2, 3, 9)
- Robben Ford – guitar (4, 5)
- Jimmie Vaughan - guitar (6, 8, 9, 10)
- Stevie Ray Vaughan - guitar (6, 8, 10)
- Randy "The Emperor" Jackson – bass guitar (1, 4, 5, 7)
- Al Kooper – Hammond organ (9), keyboards (2, 3)
- David Lindley – bouzouki (7), guitar (1), slide guitar (6, 8, 10)
- David McMurray – saxophone (10)
- Donald Ray Mitchell – backing vocals (9)
- Jamie Muhoberac – Hammond organ (1, 6, 8, 10)
- David Was – backing vocals (9), production
- Don Was – bass guitar (2, 3, 6, 8, 9, 10), production

Production

- Dan Bosworth – assistant engineering
- Marsha Burns – production coordination
- Ed Cherney – engineering, mixing
- Steve Deutsch – assistant engineering
- Judy Kirshner – assistant engineering
- Jim Mitchell – assistant engineering
- Brett Swain – assistant engineering

== Certifications ==
Region	Certification	Certified units/sales
Switzerland (IFPI Switzerland)	Gold	25,000^{^}
United Kingdom (BPI)	Silver	60,000^{^}
^{^} Shipments figures based on certification alone.
