= Pressing On (Bob Dylan song) =

1980 song by Bob Dylan

Song by Bob Dylan

from the album Saved
- Released: June 23, 1980
- Recorded: February 13, 1980
- Studio: Muscle Shoals Sound Studio
- Genre: Gospel
- Length: 5:11
- Label: Columbia
- Songwriter(s): Bob Dylan
- Producer(s): Jerry Wexler and Barry Beckett

"Pressing On" is a gospel song written and performed by the American singer-songwriter Bob Dylan and released as the sixth track on his 1980 album Saved. When the album was released it was considered by many critics to be "one of the few bright spots on the album" and has stood the test of time by being covered by more than half a dozen artists in the 21st century. The song was produced by Jerry Wexler and Barry Beckett.

== Composition and recording ==
In their book Bob Dylan All the Songs: The Story Behind Every Track, authors Philippe Margotin and Jean-Michel Guesdon note how the song represents Dylan's "belief in God in spite of those who block his path or doubt", citing the Gospel of John, Chapter 6, verses 30 and 32 as Dylan's main source of inspiration. The third chapter of Paul's Epistle to the Philippians contains the phrase "press on" twice. They also point out that the song is an invitation to listeners to "look toward the future", which seems to deliberately evoke the title of Dont Look Back, D. A. Pennebaker's 1967 documentary about Dylan, with the lyric: "Shake the dust off your feet / Don't look back".

The version that appears on the album was the ninth and final take that Dylan recorded of the song at Muscle Shoals Sound Studio on February 13, 1980. According to Margotin and Guesdon, "Dylan sings a superb gospel, a transporting vocal performance" and the musicians backing him "match the level of emotion released by his amazing singing, and the vocalists pick up to deliver a stunning performance".

== Critical reception ==
In a Rolling Stone review of Saved from 1980, Kurt Loder called the track "serenely stoic", noting that it is "in part, a melodic descendant of The Band’s 'The Weight'" and that it "utilizes a gentle gospel piano and some inspired lead and backup singing to make a simple statement of spiritual commitment". Loder groups it with "Saving Grace" from the same album as a "genuinely moving" paean. Critic Dave Lifton likewise considers it one of the two "emotionally moving" songs on the album (along with "In the Garden").

Rolling Stone included "Pressing On" in a 2012 list of "Bob Dylan's Greatest Songs of the 1980s". An article accompanying the list notes that anyone who saw Dylan live in 1980 saw "an absolutely killer band, and Dylan singing with incredible passion and force" and noted that the show "often wrapped up with Dylan at the piano belting out this song". They also claim that "it deserves to be sung at every church in America. Don't get too tripped up on the message. Give it a listen".

== In popular culture ==
The song is prominently featured in the Christian Bale-starring "Pastor John" segment of I'm Not There, Todd Haynes' unconventional 2007 biopic about Dylan. Bale's character, Jack Rollins, representing gospel-era Dylan, performs the song on camera (lip-synching a version recorded for the soundtrack by musician John Doe). Doe's cover was ranked #52 by Rolling Stone on their "100 Best Songs of 2007" list. Dylan himself praised Doe's cover as being “A once in a lifetime recording" in a 2015 interview with Bill Flanagan.

"Pressing On" is also sung in its entirety on camera in two feature-length documentaries: Alicia Keys sings it in Muscle Shoals (2013), and the Chicago Mass Choir, featuring lead vocals by former Dylan back-up singer Regina McCrary, performs it in Gotta Serve Somebody: The Gospel Songs of Bob Dylan (2005).

== Cover versions ==
- Chicago Mass Choir for Gotta Serve Somebody: The Gospel Songs of Bob Dylan (2003)
- John Doe for the I'm Not There soundtrack (2007)
- Valdemar featuring Mattias Hellberg and the London Community Gospel Choir on Saving Grace: The Gospel Songs of Bob Dylan (2007)
- Antony and the Johnsons for the Thank You for Your Love EP (2010)
- Alicia Keys for the documentary Muscle Shoals (2013)
- Glen Hansard for Bob Dylan in the 80s: Volume One (2014)

== Live versions ==
Dylan performed the song 65 times in concert in 1979 and 1980. Three of these live versions (along with an alternate studio take) were included on the album The Bootleg Series Vol. 13: Trouble No More 1979–1981.
