= Foot of Pride =

Song by Bob Dylan

from the album The Bootleg Series Volumes 1–3 (Rare & Unreleased) 1961–1991
- Released: March 26, 1991
- Recorded: April 25, 1983
- Studio: Power Station (New York)
- Length: 5:56
- Label: Columbia
- Songwriter: Bob Dylan
- Producers: Bob Dylan; Mark Knopfler

"Foot of Pride" is a song by American singer-songwriter Bob Dylan. First recorded during the sessions for Infidels (1983), it was omitted from that album and instead released in 1991 on The Bootleg Series Volumes 1–3 (Rare & Unreleased) 1961–1991. Like the rest of the Infidels sessions, it was co-produced by Dylan and Mark Knopfler, and recorded at the Power Station in New York City in the spring of 1983.

"Foot of Pride" has received positive reviews from critics and biographers, with some considering it superior to material that was included on Infidels. The song was covered by Lou Reed for The 30th Anniversary Concert Celebration in 1992.

== Background and recording ==
According to biographer Clinton Heylin, Dylan recorded more takes of "Foot of Pride" than any other song in his career up to that point, with forty-four takes occurring across six sessions. Heylin notes both that three of these sessions were devoted entirely to the recording of this song, and also the fact that it would be arranged in a multitude of genres, including bossa nova and reggae. According to writer Brian Hinton, the song was originally slated to appear on side two of Infidels. Dylan copyrighted the song on May 2, 1983, using the same version that he would later release on The Bootleg Series Volumes 1–3 (Rare & Unreleased) 1961–1991. While Dylan stated in 1991 that the song was excluded from Infidels because "the tempo speeded up... for some vague and curious reason", Heylin finds this explanation to be questionable, both due to the number of takes recorded of the song and the fact that the officially released version is "one in which the tempo—and the message—never deviate[s]".

== Composition ==
Heylin describes "Foot of Pride" as a "long rant in the language of Kings" which includes Dylan "namechecking a number of popular songs co-opted by the proud to cover their parasitic tracks", such as "Amazing Grace", "Danny Boy", and "Abraham, Martin and John" (the latter of which, Heylin notes, is quoted within the lyrics). He interprets the song as being sung from the point of view of someone mourning at a funeral, "looking down on a man the narrator had known, and looking back on the life he led", with the final verse containing "the perfect eulogy to a man killed by his own hubris". Hinton cites the track as evidence that Dylan had not "left surrealism behind", with lyrics that "sound like a hellfire preacher on LSD".

Thomas Ward of AllMusic considers "Foot of Pride" to be "one of the most explosive and venomous songs Dylan has ever written", with verses "cascading with potent imagery". Nick DeRiso of Ultimate Classic Rock describes the song as a "perfectly executed Dylan put-down about those trapped in ego". Ward notes the lyrics' combination of spiritual and secular themes, characterizing it as a "moralist song about the wrongdoings of man". Jim Beviglia of American Songwriter describes the song as a "potent, fast-talking stomper where Dylan ran through his enemy list with eloquent fury". Heylin argues that, had the song been included as the final track on Infidels, it would have "left no one in any doubt that he [Dylan] remained appalled by man's inhumanity to man".

== Reception and legacy ==
DeRiso laments the decision to leave "Foot of Pride" off of Infidels in lieu of "Union Sundown", which he deems to be a "much lesser effort". Heylin considers the song to be one of Dylan's "most unrelenting polemics, and one of his best". Conversely, Ward finds the decision to omit the track understandable, considering it "much too long and rambl[ing] in places" despite the presence of "many eminently quotable lines". Beviglia argues that while Infidels is "great as is", the inclusion of "Foot of Pride" and "Blind Willie McTell" "could have made it a masterpiece".

While Dylan has never performed the song in concert, it was covered by Lou Reed for Dylan's 30th Anniversary Concert, a rendition with Ward praises as being "justly famous". Rolling Stone Australia included this rendition on their list of the 80 Greatest Dylan Covers of All Time, opining that the song's lyrical content sounded "custom-made for Reed", with the performance making the song "seem like a lost classic from the Velvet Underground catalog".
