= I and I (song) =

1983 single by Bob Dylan

Single by Bob Dylan

from the album Infidels
- B-side: "Angel Flying Too Close to the Ground"
- Released: November 1983
- Recorded: April 27, 1983
- Studio: Power Station, New York City
- Genre: Reggae rock
- Length: 5:10
- Label: Columbia
- Songwriter: Bob Dylan
- Producers: Mark Knopfler; Bob Dylan

Bob Dylan singles chronology
"Union Sundown" (1983)	"I and I" (1983)	"Sweetheart Like You" (1983)

"I and I" is a song by Bob Dylan that appears as the seventh track (or song number three on Side 2 of the LP) of his 1983 album Infidels. Recorded on April 27, 1983, it was released as a single in Europe in November of that year, featuring a version of Willie Nelson's "Angel Flying Too Close to the Ground" as its B-side. The song was produced by Dylan and Dire Straits frontman Mark Knopfler.

== Background and composition ==
The phrase "I and I" comes from the Rastafari vocabulary and refers to the "oneness" between God and humans. According to Rastafarian scholar E.E. Cashmore, "'I and I' is an expression to totalize the concept of oneness, the oneness of two persons. So God is within all of us and we're one people in fact. I and I means that God is in all human beings. The bond of Ras Tafari is the bond of God, of human being. But human being itself needs a head and the head of human being is His Imperial Majesty Haile Selassie I (always pronounced as the letter 'I', never as the number one or 'the first') of Ethiopia." The phrase is often used in place of "you and I".

Dylan described "I and I" as "one of them Caribbean songs. One year a bunch of songs just came to me hanging around down in the islands." He also claimed to have written the song in "about fifteen minutes" according to a famous anecdote often recounted by his friend Leonard Cohen. According to Dylan scholar Tony Attwood, "Musically the song is a simple minor key blues riff built around Am, C, G; D Am. The chorus has the same musical basis, just leaving out the C chord. It is one of the many amazing things about Dylan's music how it can get so much out of a chord sequence he has used so often before."

The song's lyrics are often interpreted as an auto-commentary on the dichotomy between Dylan's private and public selves. Critic Tim Riley sees the line "Someone else is speakin' with my mouth, but I'm listening only to my heart / I've made shoes for everyone, even you, while I still go barefoot" in particular as exploring the distance between Dylan's "inner identity and the public face he wears".

=== Personnel ===
In addition to Dylan, the song features Mark Knopfler and Mick Taylor on guitar, Alan Clark on the keyboard, Robbie Shakespeare on bass and Sly Dunbar on drums.

== Reception ==
Spectrum Culture included the song on a list of "Bob Dylan's 20 Best Songs of the 1980s". In an article accompanying the list, critic Kevin Korber notes that "'I and I' feels like the most personal song on Infidels, an album not exactly known for Dylan cutting to the core of his or our very souls. Indeed, he feels very much present in the song, rather than playing the part of a detached narrator. Rather than use the deeply personal language that he used in his '70s work, though, Dylan's words take on a broader tone that still feels spiritual to some degree. He invokes King David and Hammurabi in the verses, and the chorus line 'I and I / In creation where one's nature neither honors nor forgives' feels more philosophical than grounded. In that sense, 'I and I' maintains the throughline of Dylan's newfound faith; it just finds him focusing on fire and brimstone as opposed to clouds and seraphim."

Rolling Stone included it on a list of "Bob Dylan's Greatest Songs of the 1980s", calling it a "pretty, mystical song" and praising the "light Jamaican touch" laid down by the "legendary rhythm section of Sly Dunbar and Robbie Shakespeare".

The Big Issue placed it at #63 on a list of the "80 best Bob Dylan songs – that aren't the greatest hits". A 2021 Guardian article included it on a list of "80 Bob Dylan songs everyone should know".

== Live performances ==
According to Dylan's official website, he performed the song 204 times in concert between 1984 and 1999. A live version from Dylan's summer European tour of 1984 was included on his album Real Live. A live version performed in Dijon, France on July 1, 1998 was made available to stream on Dylan's website in August 1998. The last performance (to date) took place at Veterans Memorial Coliseum in New Haven, Connecticut on November 10, 1999. It is Dylan's most frequently performed live song from the Infidels album.

== Other versions ==
Dylan allowed the song to be remixed by Doctor Dread for the 2004 album Is It Rolling, Bob? A Reggae Tribute to Bob Dylan Vol. 1. The album featured two remixes of the song, a reggae remix and a more radically altered dub remix. Both remixes were included on a 12" vinyl "Jokerman / I and I Reggae Remix EP" released on Record Store Day in 2021.

An alternate take of the song from the Infidels sessions in 1983 was included on the 2021 compilation album The Bootleg Series Vol. 16: Springtime in New York 1980–1985.
