= Tight Connection to My Heart (Has Anybody Seen My Love) =

Single by Bob Dylan

from the album Empire Burlesque
- B-side: "We Better Talk This Over"
- Released: 1985
- Genre: Rock; new wave
- Length: 5:22
- Label: Columbia
- Songwriter: Bob Dylan
- Producer: Bob Dylan

Bob Dylan singles chronology
"Jokerman" (1983)	"Tight Connection to My Heart (Has Anybody Seen My Love)" (1985)	"When the Night Comes Falling from the Sky" (1985)

"Tight Connection to My Heart (Has Anybody Seen My Love)" is a song by Bob Dylan that was released on his 1985 album Empire Burlesque. As a single, it was a Top 40 Hit in New Zealand and Belgium. An earlier version of the song, entitled "Someone's Got a Hold of My Heart", was recorded for Dylan's 1983 LP Infidels, but was not included on that album; it later appeared on The Bootleg Series Volumes 1–3 (Rare & Unreleased) 1961–1991.

== Development and recording ==
=== "Someone's Got a Hold of My Heart" ===
An early version of "Tight Connection to My Heart (Has Anybody Seen My Love)" was recorded during sessions for Infidels, Dylan's 1983 album, as "Someone's Got a Hold of My Heart". A total of thirteen takes of the song were recorded at the Power Station Studio in New York City, in three of the recording sessions, on April 16, April 25 and April 26. On the recording sheet, the song was listed as "Hold of My Heart". One of the April 25 takes was released on The Bootleg Series Volumes 1–3 (Rare & Unreleased) 1961–1991.

==== Personnel ====
The following musicians played on the recording released on The Bootleg Series Volumes 1–3 (Rare & Unreleased) 1961–1991:

- Bob Dylan – guitar, harmonica, vocals
- Mick Taylor – guitar
- Mark Knopfler – guitar
- Alan Clark – Keyboards
- Robbie Shakespeare – bass guitar
- Sly Dunbar – drums

=== "Tight Connection to My Heart (Has Anybody Seen My Love)" ===
==== Music ====
Dylan used the basic track from one of the "Someone's Got a Hold of My Heart" takes from 1983, and added vocal overdubs in January 1985, including vocals by female backup singers.

==== Lyrics ====
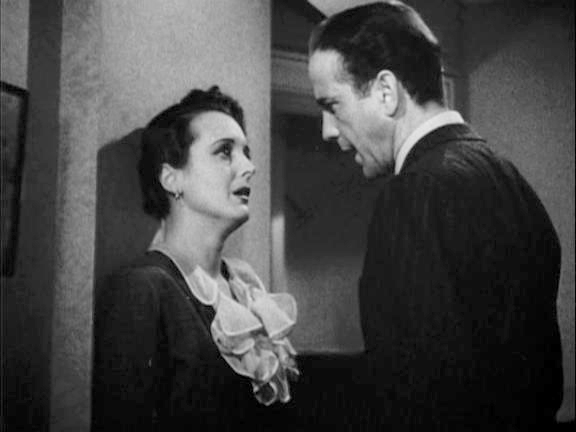
Humphrey Bogart and Mary Astor in the 1941 film The Maltese Falcon. Dylan borrowed lines from this and other Bogart films for "Tight Connection to My Heart".

Dylan critic Michael Gray notes that, as elsewhere on the Empire Burlesque album, "Tight Connection to My Heart" includes references to a number of lines of dialogue from Humphrey Bogart films. In Sirocco, Bogart says, "'I've got to move fast: I can't with you around my neck", which becomes "Well I had to move fast/And I couldn't with you around my neck" in the song. Also in Sirocco, Bogart says, "I don't know whether I'm too good for you or you're too good for me", changed to "But I can’t figure out if I’m too good for you/Or if you’re too good for me" in "Tight Connection to My Heart". In The Maltese Falcon, when Bogart's character [Sam Spade] is told "We wanna talk to you, Spade", he replies, "Well, go ahead and talk"; Dylan turns this into "You want to talk to me/Go ahead and talk". Gray writes that Dylan's line "I’ll go along with the charade/Until I can think my way out" is said in the movie Tokyo Joe (this line has elsewhere been attributed to another Bogart film, Sahara). A variation on this same line was also used in the Star Trek episode "The Squire of Gothos" in 1967. In The Oklahoma Kid, Bogart says to James Cagney: "I wanna talk to you, kid;" Cagney replies: "Go ahead and talk." Cagney is later arrested for a crime he didn't commit, and kills two men for attempting to get away when he is arresting them for the crime. The song includes the lines "You wanna talk to me/Go ahead and talk/I must be guilty of something" and "Later he'll be shot for resisting arrest".

Gray additionally hears references to some non-Bogart films in the song. In Now and Forever, from 1934, Gary Cooper says about some police officers that "Close up they don’t look as large as they do from a distance;" in the song this becomes "What looks large from a distance/Close up ain’t never that big". Other references are to "Memphis in June", the Hoagy Carmichael song used in Johnny Angel, and to the film title Town Without Pity.

Several lines in the song appear to reference images and dialogue from the 1965 film A High Wind in Jamaica, including “Hands are already sweaty/hasn’t even started yet,” “I have to get my coat,” “…want to talk to/go ahead and talk,” “…one we’ve been waiting for/got the key,” and Anthony Quinn’s culminating line, “You must be guilty of something.”

About the film references, biographer Clinton Heylin complains of Dylan's "reliance on the dialogue of Hollywood scriptwriters for any lyrical gaps, as he replaced blazingly original lines from Someone's Got a Hold of My Heart with excerpts from Humphrey Bogart movie scripts". Jonathan Lethem, contributor to The Cambridge Companion to Bob Dylan, is likewise disappointed that the rewrite "replaces the original's vulnerable tone with a Bogartishly hardboiled one". Gray writes that "these film script snatches...are so unmemorable and unarresting as content yet are mostly so attractive, tersely energetic and imitable as conversational rhythms, and offer cadences of heightened moment: they are great movie lines, in fact, and understandably appealing to [Dylan]". He adds that, in some of the instances, "Dylan’s sub-editing, his tightening-up, gives [the lines] their radiance. You might feel that they’re easy building blocks for writer‘s-block sufferers, or for singer-songwriters with nothing special to say. Or you might feel that Dylan has made himself inward with, and then re-expressed creatively, yet another branch of American popular culture: one that may have been handed down from above, from the on-highs of Hollywood, but one that has inhabited the shared minds of millions of ordinary people".

==== Personnel ====
The following musicians played on the recording released on Empire Burlesque:

- Bob Dylan – keyboards, vocals
- Mick Taylor, Ted Perlman – guitar
- Robbie Shakespeare – bass guitar
- Sly Dunbar – drums
- Carol Dennis, Queen Esther Marrow, Peggi Blu – backing vocals

== Release and appraisal ==
"Tight Connection to My Heart (Has Anybody Seen My Love)" was released as the opening track on Empire Burlesque on May 30, 1985. As a single, it was released with "We Better Talk This Over" as the B-side; this song first appeared on 1978's Street-Legal. The single reached the Top 10 in New Zealand and the Top 40 in Belgium; it also reached No. 71 in Canada. In the 2000s, the song was put on the Dylan compilation The Ultimate Collection, as well as on certain editions of The Essential Bob Dylan, including the "Limited Tour Edition" and the "Australian Bonus Tracks Edition".

Cash Box called the song "moving," saying that "with gospel vocals and Mick Taylor’s guitar coloring this song of yearning, Bob Dylan is back on a very productive track." AllMusic critic Stephen Thomas Erlewine describes "Tight Connection to My Heart" as a "subtle gem", while for Thomas Ward, also of AllMusic, the song is "tremendous fun". The writers of The New Rolling Stone Album Guide, include the composition in "the all-time canon of great Dylan songs on lousy Dylan albums". Similarly, critic Anthony Varesi, for whom "the bulk of [Empire Burlesque] is unattractive", characterizes "Tight Connection to My Heart" as "fantastic". The editors of Mojo magazine likewise praise the song, calling it "deeply '80s but entertainingly breezy" while lamenting that Empire Burlesque "fails to scrape even modest heights thereafter".

Spectrum Culture included the song on a 2020 list of "Bob Dylan's 20 Best Songs of the 1980s". A 2021 Guardian article included it on a list of "80 Bob Dylan songs everyone should know".

== Music video ==
Paul Schrader directed an official music video for the song, which was shot in Tokyo and featured Dylan and veteran Japanese actress Mitsuko Baisho. Reflecting on the video in 2018, Schrader said, "Boy, was that a mistake. I said to Bob while we were doing it, 'Bob, if you ever hear I’m doing another music video, take me out in the backyard and hose me down.' I didn’t understand music videos; I’m much too linear. I just didn’t understand the free randomness of the imagery, particularly with Dylan, who’s very random in his imagery as well."

== Other versions ==
An outtake of the song from the Empire Burlesque sessions in 1985 was included on the 2021 compilation album The Bootleg Series Vol. 16: Springtime in New York 1980–1985.

== Live performances and covers ==
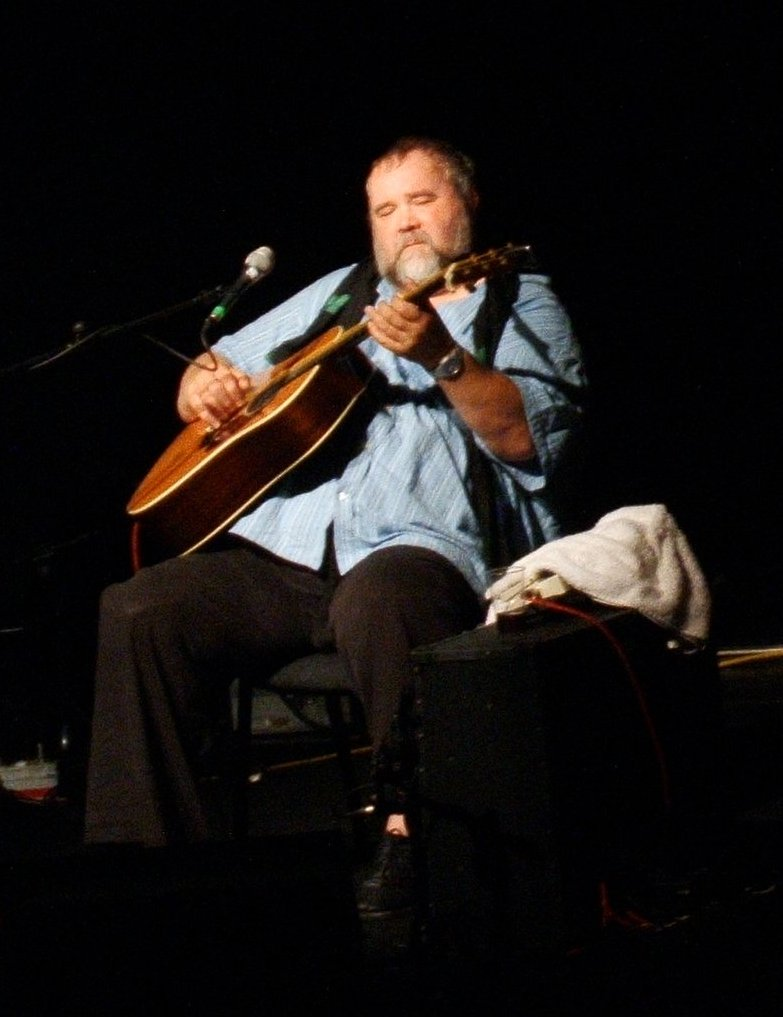
British singer-songwriter John Martyn, shown here in 2006, is among the artists who have covered "Tight Connection to My Heart (Has Anybody Seen My Love)".

Dylan performed "Tight Connection to My Heart" 14 times in the early 1990s. He first performed it on January 12, 1990 in New Haven, Connecticut and then 11 more times in 1990. On November 16 and 17, 1993 he played the song twice in New York City. A performance from the latter show was made available to stream on Dylan's official website on May 24, 2001.

John Martyn released a cover on the first pressing of his 1986 album Piece by Piece.

The song is featured in Conor McPherson's musical play Girl from the North Country, which had its premiere at London's Old Vic theatre in 2017. A version sung by cast member Sheila Atim and arranged by Simon Hale was included on the Original London Cast Recording album, also released in 2017. The Big Issue placed Atim's version at #19 on a 2021 list of the "80 best Bob Dylan songs - that aren't the greatest hits", noting that it had been "resurrected and reinvented" for the play.

== Charts ==
Chart (1985)	Peak position
Belgian Charts	38
Canadian RPM Singles Chart	71
New Zealand Singles Chart	8
US Billboard Bubbling Under Hot 100 Singles	103
US Billboard Top Rock Tracks	19
