= Dark Eyes (Bob Dylan song) =

1985 song by Bob Dylan

Song by Bob Dylan

from the album Empire Burlesque
- Released: June 10, 1985
- Recorded: March 3, 1985
- Studio: Power Station, New York City
- Genre: Folk
- Length: 5:07
- Label: Columbia
- Songwriter: Bob Dylan
- Producer: Bob Dylan

"Dark Eyes" is a folk song written and performed by American singer-songwriter Bob Dylan that appears as the 10th and final track on his 1985 album Empire Burlesque. The song features a sparse arrangement in which Dylan's vocal is only accompanied by his own acoustic guitar and a harmonica played in a rack, and is thus devoid of the "80s style" aesthetic for which the rest of the album is known. As a result, many critics and fans consider it a high point of the album. It was anthologized on the compilation albums Dylan in 2007 and The Essential Bob Dylan (2009 reissue).

== Composition and themes ==
According to his memoir, Chronicles: Volume One, Dylan wrote the song specifically to close the album at the suggestion of engineer Arthur Baker. Dylan claims that inspiration for the song came from seeing a prostitute in a hallway at the Plaza Hotel on 59th Street in New York City: "As I stepped out of the elevator, a call girl was coming toward me in the hallway—pale yellow hair wearing a fox coat—high heeled shoes that could pierce your heart. She had blue circles around her eyes, black eyeliner, dark eyes. She looked like she'd been beaten up and was afraid that she'd get beat up again. In her hand, crimson purple wine in a glass. 'I'm just dying for a drink', she said as she passed me in the hall. She had a beautifulness, but not for this kind of world. Poor wretch, doomed to walk this hallway for a thousand years".

Dylan scholar Tony Atwood sees the song as similar to "Restless Farewell", which Dylan had written specifically to close his album The Times They Are a-Changin' over 20 years earlier. According to Atwood, both songs are about "being trapped inside what you are, unable to change, unable to be anything other than what you are".

The song is performed in the key of G major.

== Reception ==
Spectrum Culture included the song on a list of "Bob Dylan's 20 Best Songs of the '80s". In an article accompanying the list, critic Kevin Korber notes that the song shows signs of being "put together quickly" but that its simplicity "arguably works in its favor. In a decade where Dylan seemed more and more in danger of getting lost in the studio, it serves as a reminder of where Dylan came from and what kind of songs he could still write". In their book Bob Dylan All the Songs: The Story Behind Every Track, authors Philippe Margotin and Jean-Michel Guesdon concur, writing that Dylan sounds "as if he wanted to return to his roots" and that the result is "worthy of his first albums".

John J. Moser, writing at The Morning Call, included it on a list of Dylan's top 10 songs about "getting older". He interpreted the song's famous final line ("A million faces at my feet but all I see are dark eyes") as being "about finding what's important in your life". It placed eighth in a Rolling Stone readers' poll of the "10 Best Bob Dylan Songs of the 1980s". Gigwise named it one of Dylan's 11 most underrated songs.

Tom Waits cited it as one of his favorite Dylan songs in an interview with the Los Angeles Times in 1991.

Patti Smith, who covered the song both by herself and as a duet with Dylan in live performance, noted that the lyrics were "in the tradition of (John) Milton and (William) Blake", calling them "very beautiful" and noting that they "stand as a poem".

== Live performances ==
Dylan has only played the song eight times in concert: once in Sydney, Australia in 1986 and seven additional times in the U.S. in the fall of 1995. All of the 1995 outings were performed as duets with Patti Smith who was Dylan's opening act for that leg of the Never Ending Tour. According to Smith, Dylan invited her to choose a song that they could perform together and "Dark Eyes" was her choice.

== Other versions ==
An alternate take of the song from the Empire Burlesque sessions in 1985 was included on the 2021 compilation album The Bootleg Series Vol. 16: Springtime in New York 1980–1985.

== Cover versions ==
- Actress Judy Davis performs the song in the 1987 film High Tide.
- Judy Collins covered it on her 1993 album Judy Collins Sings Dylan: Just Like a Woman.
- Iron & Wine and Calexico performed it for the I'm Not There (soundtrack).
- Patti Smith played it live both as a duet with Dylan and solo between 1995 and 2008.
- Joan Osborne covered it on her 2017 album Songs of Bob Dylan
- PJ Harvey performed it live in Glasgow, Scotland in 2023.
