= Unbelievable (Bob Dylan song) =

- CD single cover

Single by Bob Dylan

from the album Under the Red Sky
- B-side: "10,000 Men"
- Released: September 1990
- Recorded: March – April 1990
- Genre: Rock
- Length: 4:06
- Label: Columbia
- Songwriter: Bob Dylan

Bob Dylan singles chronology
"Most of the Time" (1989)	"Unbelievable" (1990)	"Series of Dreams" (1991)

"Unbelievable" is an uptempo rock song by American singer-songwriter Bob Dylan, released as a single in September 1990 and as the third track on his 27th studio album Under the Red Sky the same month. It was produced by Don Was, David Was and Dylan (under the pseudonym Jack Frost). Dylan also released a promotional music video for the song in which he appeared along with actresses Molly Ringwald and Sally Kirkland.

The single reached No. 70 in Canada, and No. 21 on the Billboard Rock Tracks chart.

== Reception ==
Dylan scholar Tony Attwood describes the song as lightweight but effective: "Dylan gives us what is in effect a two chord standard rock song with a third chord briefly added and not that much of a melody. In short a driving rock number. And it works!"

== In live performance ==
Dylan performed the song 29 times between 1992 and 2004 on the Never Ending Tour. The live debut occurred at Lansdowne Stadium in Ottawa, Ontario, Canada on August 22, 1992, and the last performance (to date) took place at the Tabernacle in Atlanta, Georgia on April 12, 2004.

== Covers ==
Bettye LaVette covered it as the opening track of her 2015 album Worthy.

== Charts ==
Chart (1990)	Peak position
Canadian RPM Singles Chart	70
US Top Rock Tracks (Billboard)	21
