= Empire Burlesque =

Studio album by Bob Dylan
- Released: June 8, 1985
- Recorded: July 1984, December 1984 – March 1985
- Genres: Pop; blues rock; gospel
- Length: 46:24
- Label: Columbia
- Producer: Bob Dylan

Bob Dylan chronology
Real Live (1984)	Empire Burlesque (1985)	Biograph (1985)

Bob Dylan studio album chronology
Infidels (1983)	Empire Burlesque (1985)	Knocked Out Loaded (1986)

Singles from Empire Burlesque
- 1. "Tight Connection to My Heart (Has Anybody Seen My Love)" Released: May 1985; 2. "Emotionally Yours" Released: October 1985

Empire Burlesque is the twenty-third studio album by American singer-songwriter Bob Dylan, released on June 8, 1985, on Columbia Records. Self-produced, the album peaked at No. 33 in the U.S. and No. 11 in the UK.

Accompanied by multiple session musicians—including Mike Campbell, Benmont Tench, and Howie Epstein, members of Tom Petty and the Heartbreakers—the album has a distinct "'80s style" aesthetic.

== Recording ==
Before embarking on a European tour in the summer of 1984, Dylan had spent a substantial amount of time recording demos of new songs in his Malibu home, accompanied at times by other musicians.

In rehearsals for the tour, Dylan attempted at least three of these new songs, and he occasionally found time to polish their lyrics during the tour.

When the tour was over, Dylan returned to New York and began work on his next studio album. As Clinton Heylin reports, Dylan recorded in sporadic sessions, as had become his norm, rather than "block-booking studio time" and recording in one concentrated period. The result was "an unprecedented expenditure of" time for recording a Dylan album, from July 1984 to March 1985 (although The Freewheelin' Bob Dylan had been recorded over a similarly long period).

To accommodate the casual nature of this process, Dylan chose to produce the sessions himself. Arthur Baker, who had previously worked with New Order and Afrika Bambaataa, was later recruited for these sessions, but much of the production work would actually be Dylan's.

One of his first decisions was to forgo the use of a stable set of musicians. Instead, Dylan recorded with an eclectic mix of studio professionals. An aborted session with Al Green's band was held at Intergalactic Studios on July 24, 1984. A session with Ronnie Wood (formerly of Faces and currently with The Rolling Stones), Anton Fig (best known as the drummer for David Letterman's house band), and John Paris was held at Delta Sound Studios on July 26.

The Delta session produced two notable tracks: "Driftin' Too Far from Shore" and "Clean Cut Kid". The former was set aside and would not be finished until 1986, when Dylan recorded his next album, Knocked Out Loaded. The latter had originally been recorded during the Infidels sessions in 1983, but was not completed until now.

Wood later described his surprise at Dylan's lack of authority during the mixing process. "[The engineers would] say, 'Hey Bob, we don't need this,' and he'd say, 'Oh, okay.' And they'd make a mix to their ears, and he'd just stand outside and let them do it. And I'd be saying, 'Hey! You can't let these guys...Look!! They've left off the background vocals!' or 'What about the drums?!' But there would be something going on in the back of his head which didn't allow him to interfere. And yet if he'd have gone into the control room with the dominance that he had while we were cutting the stuff, it could have been mind-bending."

During one session between July and September 1984 (at the Power Station), Dylan demoed a song called "Go 'Way Little Boy", with Ron Wood and "cowpunk" rockers Lone Justice. Dylan and Wood also played on Lone Justice's version of "Go 'Way Little Boy", which was recorded at the same session and was ultimately released as a B-side to their single "Sweet Sweet Baby (I'm Falling)". A blues number entitled "Oh Baby" was also recorded with the same lineup but has never surfaced.

In terms of his own album, the New York sessions had so far been fairly unproductive. After six months of work, Dylan had only a few recordings that were deemed acceptable, and only two of these would eventually appear on Empire Burlesque. "Sometimes nothing comes out, and other times I get a lot of stuff that I keep," Dylan said at the time. "I just put down the songs that I felt as I wanted to put them down. Then I'd listen and decide if I liked them. And if I didn't like them I'd either rerecord them or change something about them." In November, Dylan returned to Los Angeles and began recording there.

An early session at Ocean Way Studios produced little if any work that was used for Empire Burlesque. Much time was spent covering other artists’ songs, including “In the Summertime” by Ray Dorset (not to be confused with Dylan's own song of the same name), "Freedom for the Stallion" by Allen Toussaint and “Help Me Make It Through The Night” by Kris Kristofferson.

Work became much more productive when Dylan started recording at Cherokee Studios in Hollywood. Recruiting Lone Justice drummer Don Heffington for the early December sessions, Dylan recorded an ambitious song he had co-written with playwright Sam Shepard, titled "New Danville Girl", as well as another song. Acceptable takes were recorded for both songs, though, despite positive feedback from his peers, Dylan ultimately omitted "New Danville Girl" from Empire Burlesque.

Regardless, he also found success on the next song, "Something's Burning, Baby", recorded at Cherokee on December 14. Benmont Tench, Mike Campbell and Howie Epstein, from Tom Petty's Heartbreakers, joined Heffington for the session.

Over the rest of the winter, Dylan recorded most of the tracks that were ultimately used for Empire Burlesque. On January 28, 1985, another session at Cherokee produced the master take for "Seeing the Real You at Last". This was followed by a brief stop at A&M Studios on January 28 and/or 29 to record his contribution to "We Are the World". On February 5, Dylan recorded master takes for two more tracks: "Trust Yourself" and "I'll Remember You". On February 14—Valentine's Day—Dylan recorded love songs, including Johnny Cash's "Straight A's in Love", but also one of his own, "Emotionally Yours". With the exception of the "We Are the World" session, all of these songs were recorded with Heffington, the three Heartbreakers and a few other session players at Cherokee Studios in Hollywood.

Between February 14 and 19, Dylan returned to New York City, resuming work at the Power Station. On February 19, he held a session with Roy Bittan on piano and Steve Van Zandt on guitar, both members of Bruce Springsteen's E Street Band. They recorded at least one usable take of "When the Night Comes Falling from the Sky", but Bittan and Van Zandt would not return for the remainder of the sessions.

The following day, Sly Dunbar and Robbie Shakespeare, better known as reggae recording artists Sly & Robbie, joined the sessions. They had previously worked with Dylan on Infidels. Along with female vocalists Queen Esther Marrow, Debra Byrd and Carolyn Dennis, the group recorded "Never Gonna Be the Same Again".

On February 23, Dylan returned to the Power Station with Sly & Robbie, his back-up singers and a number of session players, including Al Kooper, who filled in on guitar. The day's work produced a significantly different version of "When the Night Comes Falling from the Sky", which was ultimately chosen over the "Van Zandt version" from a few days before.

Around this time, Dylan also revived from the Infidels sessions "Someone's Got a Hold of My Heart". "A song about being torn apart by irreconcilable demands," according to Clinton Heylin, in revision it was stripped of "just about every religious allusion from the original." Dylan retitled it "Tight Connection to My Heart" and set it aside for further overdubbing.

One final song was recorded on March 3, a brand-new composition no more than a few days old. Recorded live-to-tape with no editing, overdubbing or embellishment, "Dark Eyes" was also sequenced as the last song of the album.

Some further overdubbing was scheduled, but with recording essentially finished, Arthur Baker was left to mix the album. "I'm not too experienced at having records sound good," said Dylan. "I don't know how to go about doing that. With Arthur Baker...I just went out and recorded a bunch of stuff all over the place, and then when it was time to put this record together, I brought it all to him and he made it sound like a record."

== Songs ==
The opening track, "Tight Connection to My Heart (Has Anybody Seen My Love)", was originally recorded for 1983's Infidels under the title "Someone's Got a Hold of My Heart" (eventually released on The Bootleg Series Volumes 1–3 (Rare & Unreleased) 1961–1991). It was re-written and re-recorded several times before finding its way on to Empire Burlesque. A lushly produced pop song riding a reggae groove courtesy of Robbie Shakespeare and Sly Dunbar (better known as Sly & Robbie), the love song was singled out as the best track on the album by the most recent edition of The Rolling Stone Album Guide. The track, which features Mick Taylor on guitar (from Dylan's 84 Tour), was also chosen as the first single for Empire Burlesque.

Clinton Heylin describes "Seeing the Real You at Last" as "a compendium of images half remembered from Hollywood movies", as many of the lyrics made "allusions to Humphrey Bogart movies, Shane, even Clint Eastwood's Bronco Billy."

The love ballad "I'll Remember You" was still played in concert until 2005, more so than all but one other song from Empire Burlesque. It was also featured, in an acoustic version, in the movie Masked & Anonymous, though not included on the released soundtrack. A Baker-produced version of the song was recorded by Grayson Hugh for the closing credits of the 1991 film Fried Green Tomatoes.

"Clean-Cut Kid" was another song recorded during the Infidels sessions. The lyrics weren't finished until much later, and the finished result was included on Empire Burlesque. In the interim Bob gave the song to Carla Olson of the Textones as a thank you for her appearing in his first-ever video, for Sweetheart Like You. She included it on the Textones' debut album Midnight Mission and Ry Cooder was featured on slide guitar. A novelty song wrapped around sharp political commentary, the 'clean-cut kid' is an average American kid who's radically altered by his experience in the Vietnam War. Village Voice critic Robert Christgau praised it as "the toughest Vietnam-vet song yet."

When members of the press, as well as Dylan's own fans, dubbed Empire Burlesque as 'Disco Dylan', it was mainly for the song "When the Night Comes Falling from the Sky". An evocative song filled with apocalyptic imagery, it was originally an upbeat, piledriving rocker recorded with Steven Van Zandt and Roy Bittan, both members of Bruce Springsteen's E Street Band. Unsatisfied with the recording, Dylan and Baker radically recast the song as a contemporary dance track. (The earlier version was later released on The Bootleg Series Volumes 1-3 (Rare & Unreleased) 1961-1991.)

The penultimate song, "Something's Burning, Baby", is another song filled with apocalyptic imagery. A slow-building march accented with synthesizers, it was singled out by biographer Clinton Heylin as the strongest track on Empire Burlesque: "An ominous tale set to a slow march beat, [it] was a welcome reminder of his ongoing preoccupations with that dreadful day."

"Dark Eyes" features only Dylan on guitar and harmonica. According to earlier interviews and Dylan's autobiography Chronicles, it was written virtually on demand when Arthur Baker suggested something simpler for the album's final track. Dylan liked the idea of closing the album with a stark, acoustic track, particularly when the rest of the album was so heavily produced. However, Dylan didn't have an appropriate song. He returned to his hotel in Manhattan after midnight, and according to Dylan:

"As I stepped out of the elevator, a call girl was coming toward me in the hallway—pale yellow hair wearing a fox coat—high heeled shoes that could pierce your heart. She had blue circles around her eyes, black eyeliner, dark eyes. She looked like she'd been beaten up and was afraid that she'd get beat up again. In her hand, crimson purple wine in a glass. 'I'm just dying for a drink,' she said as she passed me in the hall. She had a beautifulness, but not for this kind of world."

The brief, chance encounter inspired Dylan to write "Dark Eyes", which was quickly recorded without any studio embellishment. It is often quoted for its last chorus: "A million faces at my feet, but all I see are dark eyes."

A number of critics have noted the bizarre sources of inspiration behind some of the songs. As mentioned, some lines were lifted from old Humphrey Bogart pictures, but at least a few were taken from the sci-fi television show Star Trek. Author Clinton Heylin wrote that "one of the best couplets—'I'll go along with the charade / Until I can think my way out' (from "Tight Connection to My Heart")—actually comes verbatim from a Star Trek episode, 'Squire of Gothos'." Some say this line was originally used in the Humphrey Bogart movie Sahara, though this is erroneous.

== Reception and legacy ==
Professional ratings
Review scores
Source	Rating
AllMusic	4.5/5 stars
Christgau's Record Guide	B+
The Encyclopedia of Popular Music	2/5 stars
Entertainment Weekly	C+
MusicHound Rock	2/5
Rolling Stone	(favorable)
The Rolling Stone Album Guide	2/5 stars

Upon its release, Empire Burlesque received generally positive reviews, most notably a full-page review in Time, but a number of critics demurred on the production, reservations that presaged Empire Burlesque's poor reputation in later years.

Members of the press claimed Dylan was trying to achieve a then-contemporary sound on Empire Burlesque; Dylan jokingly replied that he did not know anything about new music, adding "I still listen to Charley Patton."

In his Consumer Guide column for The Village Voice, critic Robert Christgau wrote, "At best [Dylan]'s achieved the professionalism he's always claimed as his goal...he's certainly talented enough to come up with a good bunch of songs. Hence, his best album since Blood on the Tracks. I wish that was a bigger compliment."

As promotion for Empire Burlesque, music videos for "Tight Connection to My Heart", "When the Night Comes Falling from the Sky", and "Emotionally Yours" were produced and broadcast on MTV, with Paul Schrader (best known for his work with Martin Scorsese) directing the video for "Tight Connection to My Heart (Has Anybody Seen My Love)". However, album sales remained fairly modest.

== Track listing ==
All tracks are written by Bob Dylan.

Side one
No.	Title	Recorded	Length
1.	"Tight Connection to My Heart (Has Anybody Seen My Love)"	January 15, 1985	5:22
2.	"Seeing the Real You at Last"	January 28, 1985	4:21
3.	"I'll Remember You"	February 5, 1985	4:14
4.	"Clean Cut Kid"	July 26, 1984	4:17
5.	"Never Gonna Be the Same Again"	February 20, 1985	3:11
Total length:			21:25

Side two
No.	Title	Recorded	Length
1.	"Trust Yourself"	February 5, 1985	3:29
2.	"Emotionally Yours"	February 12, 1985	4:30
3.	"When the Night Comes Falling from the Sky"	February 23, 1985	7:30
4.	"Something's Burning, Baby"	December 14, 1984	4:54
5.	"Dark Eyes"	March 6, 1985	5:07
Total length:			25:30

== Personnel ==
=== Musicians ===
Track numbering refers to CD and digital releases of the album.

- Bob Dylan – vocals, guitar (2, 4, 6, 8, 10), keyboards (1, 5), piano (3, 7), harmonica (4, 10)
- Peggi Blu – backing vocals (1, 4, 5)
- Debra Byrd – backing vocals (5, 6)
- Ted Perlman – guitar (1)
- Mick Taylor – guitar (1)
- Mike Campbell – guitar (2, 3, 6, 7)
- Ronnie Wood – guitar (4)
- Sid McGinnis – guitar (5)
- Ira Ingber – guitar (9)
- Chops – horns (2)
- Alan Clark – synthesizer (5)
- Carolyn Dennis – backing vocals (1, 4, 5, 6)
- Sly Dunbar – drums (1, 5, 8)
- Don Heffington – drums (2, 9)
- Jim Keltner – drums (3, 6, 7)
- Anton Fig – drums (4)
- Robbie Shakespeare – bass guitar (1, 5, 6, 8, 9)
- Bob Glaub – bass guitar (2)
- Howie Epstein – bass guitar (3, 7)
- Jon Paris – bass guitar (4)
- Bashiri Johnson – percussion (2, 6, 8)
- Stuart Kimball – electric guitar (8)
- Al Kooper – rhythm guitar (8)
- Queen Esther Marrow – backing vocals (1, 4, 5, 6)
- Vince Melamed – synthesizer (9)
- Madelyn Quebec – vocals (3, 6, 8, 9)
- Richard Scher – synthesizer (1, 5, 8, 9), synth horns (7)
- Benmont Tench – keyboards (2, 6), piano (4), Hammond organ (7)
- Urban Blight – horns (8)
- David Watson – saxophone (2)

=== Production ===
- Bob Dylan – producer
- Josh Abbey – recording, engineer
- George Tutko – engineer
- Judy Feltus – engineer
- Arthur Baker – mixing

=== Artwork ===
- Nick Egan – cover design
- Ken Regan – photography

== Charts ==
=== Weekly charts ===
Chart (1985–86)	Peak position
Australian Albums (Kent Music Report)	7
Austrian Albums (Ö3 Austria)	12
Canada Top Albums/CDs (RPM)	21
Dutch Albums (Album Top 100)	14
European Albums (Eurotipsheet)	15
German Albums (Offizielle Top 100)	27
New Zealand Albums (RMNZ)	3
Norwegian Albums (VG-lista)	7
Swedish Albums (Sverigetopplistan)	5
Swiss Albums (Schweizer Hitparade)	6
UK Albums (Official Charts)	11
US Billboard 200	33

=== Year-end charts ===
Chart (1985)	Position
New Zealand Albums (RMNZ)	13

== Certifications and sales ==
Region	Certification	Certified units/sales
Australia (ARIA)	Gold	35,000^{^}
Canada (Music Canada)	Gold	50,000^{^}
New Zealand (RMNZ)	2× Platinum	30,000^{^}
^{^} Shipments figures based on certification alone.
