= Loudon Wainwright III discography =

This is a discography of American songwriter, folk singer, humorist, and actor Loudon Wainwright III.

== Studio albums ==
- Loudon Wainwright III (1970)
- Album II (1971)
- Album III (1972)
- Attempted Mustache (1973)
- Unrequited (1975)
- T Shirt (1976)
- Final Exam (1978)
- Fame and Wealth (1983)
- I'm Alright (1985)
- More Love Songs (1986)
- Therapy (1989)
- History (1992)
- Grown Man (1995)
- Little Ship (1997)
- Social Studies (1999)
- Last Man on Earth (2001)
- Here Come the Choppers (2005)
- Strange Weirdos (2007)
- Recovery (2008)
- High Wide & Handsome: The Charlie Poole Project (2009)
- 10 Songs for the New Depression (2010)
- Older Than My Old Man Now (2012)
- Haven't Got the Blues (Yet) (2014)
- Surviving Twin (2017)
- I'd Rather Lead a Band (2020)
- Lifetime Achievement (2022)

== Live albums ==
- A Live One (1979)
- Career Moves (1993)
- The BBC Sessions (recorded 1971–1993, released 1998)
- So Damn Happy (2003)
- Nine Is the Cloud (2021)
- Loudon Live In London (2025)

== Bootlegs ==
- Live at the Cactus Cafe (recorded 1990, released 2013)
- Late Night Calls (recorded 1972, released 2015)

== Compilations ==
- One Man Guy: The Best of Loudon Wainwright III 1982–1986 (1994, Music Club, UK)
- The Atlantic Recordings (1999, Rhino Handmade)
- Dead Skunk: The Complete Columbia Years (2007, Acadia, UK)
- Essential Recordings: One Man Guy (Best of Rounder Records Perfect 10 Series) (2009, Rounder Records)
- 40 Odd Years (2011, Shout! Factory)
- Years in the Making (2018, StorySound Records)

== Singles ==
- "Dead Skunk" / "Needless to Say" (Columbia 45726, 1973) (U.S. pop #16)
- "Say That You Love Me" / "New Paint" (Columbia 45849, 1973)
- "Down Drinking at the Bar" / "I Am the Way" (Columbia 45949, 1974)
- "Bell Bottom Pants" / "The Swimming Song" (Columbia 46064, 1974)
- "Dead Skunk" / "Bell Bottom Pants" (Columbia Hall of Fame 33269, 1975)
- "Bicentennial" / "Talking Big Apple '75" (Arista 0174, 1976)
- "Final Exam" / "Golfin' Blues" (Arista 0340, 1978)
- "Dead Skunk" / "Bell Bottom Pants" (Collectables 33269, 1980)
- "Five Years Old" / "Rambunctious" (Demon UK 1016, 1983)
- "Cardboard Boxes" / "Colours" (Demon UK 1039, 1985)
- "Unhappy Anniversary" / "The Acid Song" (Demon UK 1044, 1986)
- "Thank You, Girl" (John Hiatt) / "My Girl" (with John Hiatt) (Demon UK 1050, 1987)
- "Your Mother and I" / "At the End of a Long Lonely Day" (with John Hiatt) (Demon UK 1051, 1987)
- "T.S.D.H.A.V." / "Nice Guys" (Silvertone ORE 15, 1989)
- "Jesse Don't Like It" (live) / "T.S.D.H.A.V." (live) (Hannibal 0705, 1990)
- "Silent Night, Holy Night" (Terry Callier) / "The Little Drummer Boy" (John Scofield & Loudon Wainwright) (Verve, 1999)
- "Y2K" (Rykodisc, 1999)
- "Nanny" (Evangeline 4090, 2005)

== Promotional discs ==
- "Bell Bottom Pants" (mono) / "Bell Bottom Pants" (stereo), 1973, Columbia, 45 rpm
- "The Swimming Song" (stereo) / "The Swimming Song" (mono), 1973, Columbia, 45 rpm
- "Bicentennial" (mono) / "Bicentennial" (stereo), 1976, Arista, 45 rpm
- "This Year", 1988, Silvertone, 45 rpm (one-sided disc)
- "Y2K" 6-track, radio edits of the song, Rykodisc
- "History Promo #1" ("Talking New Bob Dylan", "Hitting You", "People in Love"), 1992, Virgin
- "History Promo #2" ('The Doctor", "When I'm at Your House", "So Many Songs", "Men"), 1992, Virgin
- "History Promo #3" ("People in Love"), 1992, Virgin
- Career Moves promo ("Suddenly It's Christmas"), 1993, Virgin
- Grown Man promo ("IWIWAL [I Wish I Was a Lesbian]", "Cobwebs", "Grown Man"), 1994, Virgin
- Little Ship promo, ("Mr. Ambivalent"), Virgin, 1997
- So Damn Happy promo 1 ("Something for Nothing"), 2003, Sanctuary
- So Damn Happy promo 2 ("The Picture", "The Shit Song" [radio edit], "You Never Phone"), 2003, Sanctuary
- "Daughter", from Strange Weirdos, 2007, Concord

== Other appearances ==
- The Earl Scruggs Revue, Anniversary Special, Volume One – "Swimming Song", "Gospel Ship" (cover) (1975, Columbia Records)
- Nederlands Blazers Ensemble, Si Dolce (live) – "I Am the Way", "The Last Day" (unreleased), "Road Ode", "Five Years Old" (2000, VPRO Eigenwijs)

Various Artists: Live Appearances

- Nyon Folk Festival 1979 – "The Waitress Song" (unreleased) (1979, Gat)
- Feed the Folk – "Outsidey" (1985, Temple Records)
- KGSR Broadcasts– "The Back Nine" (1993, KGSR)
- KBCO Studio C, Volume 4 – "Cardboard Boxes" (1994, KBCO)
- The Best of Mountain Stage Live, Volume 1 – "Bill of Goods" (1996, Blue Plate Music)
- KGSR Broadcasts Vol. 4– "Cobwebs" (1996, KGSR)
- The Best of the Cambridge Folk Festival – medley: "The Swimming Song"–"Pretty Little Martha"–"Dump the Dog" (1998, Strange Fruit Records)
- KGSR Broadcasts Vol. 6– "Little Ship" (1998, KGSR)
- Live at the World Cafe: Volume 9 – "Sunday Times" (1999, World Cafe)
- Seka ["Sister"] Vol. 2 – "Pretty Good Day" (2000, Twah!)
- KGSR Broadcasts Vol.10 – "No Sure Way" (2002, KGSR)
- Fresh Air in Concert – "Your Mother and I" (2003, NPR)
- KBCO Studio C, 20th Anniversary Edition – "White Winos" (2008, KBCO)

Various Artists: Studio Contributions All covers except as noted

- The Slugger's Wife Soundtrack – "Hey, Hey, My My" (with Rebecca De Mornay) (1985, MCA Records)
- From Hell to Obscurity (single B-sides) – "Colours", "At the End of a Long Lonely Day" (with John Hiatt), "My Girl" (with John Hiatt) (1989, Blackmail)
- Signed Sealed Delivered Vol. 3 – "Virgin 21" (unreleased original) (1994, Virgin)
- Beat the Retreat: Songs by Richard Thompson – "A Heart Needs a Home" (with Shawn Colvin) (1995, Capitol)
- Bleecker Street: Greenwich Village in the 60's – "Pack Up Your Sorrows" (with Iris DeMent) (1999, Astor Place)
- Love Songs For New York: Wish You Were Here – "No Sure Way" (original) (2002, Megaforce)
- The Aviator: Music from the Motion Picture – "After You've Gone" (2004, Columbia/Sony Music Soundtrax)
- Rogue's Gallery: Pirate Ballads, Sea Songs, and Chanteys – "Turkish Revelry", "Good Ship Venus" (2006, ANTI-)
- Boardwalk Empire Volume 1: Music from the HBO Original Series – "Carrickfergus" (2011, Elektra/Asylum)
- Boardwalk Empire Volume 2: Music from the HBO Original Series – "The Prisoner's Song" (2013, ABKCO)
- 30 Days, 30 Songs - "I Had a Dream" (original) (2016)

Album Tracks on Compilations and Soundtracks

- The New Age of Atlantic – "Motel Blues" (1972, Atlantic Records)
- Dr. Demento Presents The Greatest Novelty Records of All Time: Volume 4: The 1970s – "Dead Skunk" (1985, Rhino)
- Super Hits of the '70s: Have a Nice Day, Vol. 10 – "Dead Skunk" (1990, Rhino)
- Hitchin' a Ride: 70's Greatest Rock Hits, Volume 10 – "Dead Skunk" (1991, Priority Records)
- Life in the Folk Lane II – "Hard Day on the Planet" (1994, Diablo Records)
- Troubadours of the Folk Era, Vol. 4: The '70s – "Old Friend" (1995, Rhino)
- Golfs [sic] Greatest Hits – "Golfin' Blues" (1996, Teed Off Records, distributed by BMG)
- Mellow Rock Hits of the '70s: Sundown – "Glad to See You've Got Religion" (1997, Rhino)
- Soft Rock Classics – "Glad to See You've Got Religion" (1998, Rhino) (3-disk re-package including previous item)
- Family Album – "The Picture" (1998, Gadfly)
- Welcome to High Sierra – "Primrose Hill" (1998, Popmafia)
- Unconditionally Guaranteed Volume 7 (August 1999): Uncut's Guide to the Month's Best Music – "Pretty Good Day" (1999, Uncut Magazine)
- 28 Days: Original Motion Picture Soundtrack – "Heaven and Mud", "Drinking Song", "White Winos", "Dreaming" (2000, Uni/Varèse Sarabande)
- Washington Square Memoirs: The Great Urban Folk Boom (1950–1970) – "School Days" (2001, Rhino)
- Chart-Topping Crazy Hits – "Dead Skunk" (2004, Compass Productions / Warner Special products)
- Golden Slumbers: A Father's Love – "Daughter" (2005, Rendezvous Records)
- Roll With It: 16 Songs About Drinking, Dope, and Disorderly Conduct – "Drinking Song" (2008, Uncut Magazine)

== See also ==
- Martha Wainwright discography
- Rufus Wainwright discography
