= Live at the Cactus Cafe (Loudon Wainwright III album) =

Live album by Loudon Wainwright III
- Released: January 28, 2013
- Recorded: May 11, 1990, Austin, Texas
- Genre: Folk
- Label: All Access

Loudon Wainwright III chronology
Older Than My Old Man Now (2012)	Live at the Cactus Cafe (2013)

Live at the Cactus Cafe is a live album by American singer-songwriter Loudon Wainwright III, released on January 28, 2013, on All Access. Recorded on May 11, 1990, the performance was initially broadcast live on Kut-fm.

At the time of album's performance, seven of its tracks had yet to be released.

== Track listing ==
All tracks are written by Loudon Wainwright III.

No.	Title	Original release	Length
1.	"People in Love" (Live)	History	3:01
2.	"The Doctor" (Live)	History	3:31
3.	"I'm Alright" (Live)	I'm Alright	3:11
4.	"Thanksgiving" (Live)	Therapy	6:05
5.	"Me and All the Other Mothers" (Live)	Therapy	3:37
6.	"They Spelled My Name Wrong Again" (Live)	Career Moves	3:14
7.	"Unrequited to the Nth Degree" (Live)	Unrequited	3:13
8.	"You Don't Want to Know" (Live)	Therapy	3:38
9.	"A Father and a Son" (Live)	History	3:24
10.	"Rode Ode" (Live)	Career Moves	4:42
11.	"Your Mother and I" (Live)	More Love Songs	2:24
12.	"Jesse Don't Like It" (Live)	Social Studies	4:47
13.	"Dead Skunk" (Live)	Album III	2:52
14.	"Sometimes I Forget" (Live)	History	4:32
15.	"Hard Day on the Planet" (Live)	More Love Songs	5:36
