= Mike Kappus =

- Born: May 24, 1950 (age 75); Eau Claire, Wisconsin, United States
- Genres: Blues, rhythm and blues, rock, jazz
- Occupations: Music manager, record producer, booking agent

Mike Kappus (born May 24, 1950) is an American music manager and record producer.

Kappus was inducted into the Blues Hall of Fame in 2014. The Blues Foundation described Kappus as "the kind of manager and booking agent any musician would want" and "one of the most respected men in the business." In addition to naming Kappus 'Manager / Agent of the Year' an unprecedented four times, Kappus was chosen to induct Eric Clapton (2015), Elvin Bishop (2016), Mavis Staples (2017), Pops Staples (2018), and Bettye Lavette (2022) into the Blues Hall of Fame.

== Biography ==
Mike Kappus was born in Eau Claire, Wisconsin, United States. He and some of his friends at the University of Wisconsin–Eau Claire promoted regional bands and, in 1970 at age 19, Kappus became a licensed booking agent. During this time, among various other concerts, Kappus promoted Ted Nugent at the State Theater in Eau Claire for $1,000. In 1971, he joined an established agency based in Milwaukee. During the next five years, Kappus procured various musical talent for several clubs and music festivals and universities. These included booking Asleep at the Wheel, Jimmy Cliff, Chuck Berry, Bo Diddley and Sonny Terry and Brownie McGhee, plus jazz musicians including Grover Washington, Jr., Weather Report, Rahsaan Roland Kirk and George Benson, and rock acts such as the MC5 and Styx. He also established relationships with future Rosebud clients such as Muddy Waters, Willie Dixon, John Lee Hooker, Mose Allison, John Hiatt and John P. Hammond. In the early through mid-1970s, Kappus also gained further experience while curating a stage at Summerfest in Milwaukee.

In 1976, a few months after relocation to San Francisco, California, Kappus started his own Rosebud Agency. After signing Mike Bloomfield, John Hiatt and Eddie Harris on the first day of the new business, the agency grew to book about 2000 shows a year worldwide for its 30+ artists. Over the years Kappus helped launch careers for Los Lobos, Robert Cray, Ben Harper, George Thorogood & The Destroyers, John Hiatt, the Neville Brothers, and Trombone Shorty, whilst helping to raise the profile of veteran artists such as Allen Toussaint, Captain Beefheart, Muddy Waters, the Staple Singers, the Blind Boys of Alabama, Albert Collins, and John Lee Hooker. Kappus booked Thorogood's "50/50" tour in 1981, on which the band toured 50 U.S. states in the space of 50 days. Signing with the agency in 1983, Los Lobos grew from playing Los Angeles clubs when they first joined the roster to supporting U2 and touring the world in the wake of their No. 1 single, "La Bamba", from the chart-topping soundtrack album of the same name. Artists with over 20 years tenure at Rosebud included John P. Hammond, who was represented by Rosebud for 37 years, Loudon Wainwright III, The Blind Boys of Alabama and The Dirty Dozen Brass Band, Robert Cray (22 years), and the late John Lee Hooker (25 years). Charlie Watts was represented by Rosebud for his rare jazz performances for 17 plus years.

In his role as a music manager, Kappus has worked for Hooker, Cray, Hiatt, John P. Hammond, the Dirty Dozen Brass Band, Duke Robillard, Loudon Wainwright III, and represented J. J. Cale for thirty years until the latter's death in 2013.

Kappus' management of John Lee Hooker included executive producer duties, financing and coordinating Hooker's later comeback albums, including The Healer, which saw Hooker win a total of four Grammy Awards. Kappus' executive producer credits appeared on albums by Pops Staples, J. J. Cale, Robert Cray, Duke Robillard, Loudon Wainwright III, Trombone Shorty and John P. Hammond (scoring Grammy Award nominations for four consecutive projects with Hammond). Kappus was also hired by Van Morrison to oversee promotion and marketing for his April 2008 album, Keep It Simple. Its entry in the Billboard 200 at No. 10 marked the highest US chart position in Van Morrison's career to that point. Kappus also acted as associate producer on film documentaries on both Cale and Hooker, and made an appearance in both. The former, To Tulsa and Back: On Tour with J. J. Cale was released in 2005. He has also facilitated recording deals for Mavis Staples (Have a Little Faith (2004)), Bettye LaVette (I've Got My Own Hell to Raise (2005)), Charlie Watts and Buddy Guy, including that which led to Guy's Damn Right, I've Got the Blues (1991).

Kappus also initiated the HART (Handy Artists Relief Trust) Fund for the Blues Foundation in 2000. The HART Fund has gone on to thrive and attract global supporters, and has provided funds to pay for medical and funeral expenses for needy blues musicians. In his 2002 book, Boogie Man: The Adventures of John Lee Hooker in the American Twentieth Century, Charles Shaar Murray noted, "I want to thank Mike Kappus, John Lee's manager, for selecting me to be the author of this book. The Blues Foundation named Kappus 'Manager / Agent of the Year' four times.

As head of the Rosebud Agency, Kappus incorporated environmental policies and social responsibility issues, which saw the company offices fully converting to solar power in 2000. Kappus' environmental concerns also drove him to coordinate two compilations for non-profit, Earthjustice, featuring artists from Tom Waits and Willie Nelson to Norah Jones, Tina Turner, Bob Dylan, Rubén Blades, Michael Franti, Ani DiFranco, Keb Mo, Ruth Brown, Lou Reed and Etta James. Kappus also serves on the Board of Directors of the Arhoolie Foundation, which carries on the history and mission of Arhoolie Records. In addition, he has consulted for San Francisco's Hardly Strictly Bluegrass Festival, as well as providing a consultant role for the Little Village Foundation. The booking side of the Rosebud Agency closed in December 2013. Kappus was inducted into the Blues Hall of Fame in 2014. In 2022, Rosebud completed its transfer of over 250,000 items to the University of North Carolina at Chapel Hill's Southern Folklife Collection archives. This included over 45,000 live performance contracts Rosebud negotiated for its artists.

In addition to naming Kappus 'Manager / Agent of the Year' four times, Kappus was chosen to induct Eric Clapton (2015), Elvin Bishop (2016), Mavis Staples (2017), Pops Staples (2018), and Bettye Lavette in 2022, as well as inducting John Lee Hooker's The Real Folk Blues album, into the Blues Hall of Fame. Highlights of the Rosebud Agency and Kappus' history were presented in a featured exhibit at the Blues Hall of Fame, which ran from May 2017 until March 2018.

In 2019, Kappus was the project coordinator for J. J. Cale's posthumous album, Stay Around. The same year, Kappus was the producer for Betty Reid Soskin's narrative album, A Lifetime of Being Betty (Little Village Foundation). Kappus also worked as a consultant on BBC Four's 2019 televisual documentary, John Lee Hooker: The Boogie Man.

== Executive record production credits ==
Year	Album title	Artist
1988	Nobody But You	John P. Hammond
1989	The Healer	John Lee Hooker
1990	"I'm in the Mood" (single)	John Lee Hooker with Bonnie Riatt
1991	Mr. Lucky	John Lee Hooker
1992	Boom Boom	John Lee Hooker
1992	Peace to the Neighborhood	Pops Staples
1992	Got Love If You Want It	John P. Hammond
1992	History	Loudon Wainwright III
1993	Shame + A Sin	The Robert Cray Band
1993	Career Moves	Loudon Wainwright III
1993	Trouble No More ≠	John P. Hammond
1994	Temptation	Duke Robillard
1995	Chill Out	John Lee Hooker
1995	Grown Man	Loudon Wainwright III
1997	Don't Look Back	John Lee Hooker
1996	Found True Love	John P. Hammond
1997	Little Ship	Loudon Wainwright III
1997	Dangerous Place	Duke Robillard
1998	The Best of Friends	John Lee Hooker
1998	Long You As I Have You	John P. Hammond
1999	Conversations in Swing Guitar	Duke Robillard
2001	Live	J. J. Cale
2003	Time Will Tell	Robert Cray
2003	So Damn Happy	Loudon Wainwright III
2003	More Conversations in Swing Guitar	Duke Robillard
2003	Face to Face	John Lee Hooker
2004	To Tulsa and Back	J. J. Cale
2006	To Tulsa and Back On Tour With J. J. Cale (DVD)	J. J. Cale
2006	Hooker (box set)	John Lee Hooker
2009	Roll On	J. J. Cale
2010	Backatown	Trombone Shorty
2019	Stay Around ≈	J. J. Cale
2019	A Lifetime of Being Betty	Betty Reid Soskin
2020	Heaven Forever	Casey Van Beek and the Tulsa Groove

≠ - co-produced with J. J. Cale
≈ - project coordinator

== Associate and compilation record production credits ==
Year	Album title	Artist
1992	The Late Show (BBC production)	John Lee Hooker and guests
1999	Heavy Picks	Robert Cray
1999	Fish-Tree-Water-Blues	Various artists
2000	That's My Story (DVD)	John Lee Hooker
2002	The Best of Robert Cray - The Millennium Collection	Robert Cray
2002	In Session At Paradise Studios Los Angeles, 1979 (DVD and CD)	J. J. Cale featuring Leon Russell
2003	Where We Live	Various artists
