= Recovery (Loudon Wainwright album) =

Studio album by Loudon Wainwright III
- Released: August 19, 2008
- Genre: Folk
- Label: Yep Roc
- Producer: Joe Henry

Loudon Wainwright III chronology
Strange Weirdos (2007)	Recovery (2008)	High, Wide & Handsome (2009)

Professional ratings
Review scores
Source	Rating
AllMusic	3/5 stars

Recovery is the nineteenth studio album by American singer-songwriter Loudon Wainwright III, released on August 19, 2008, on Yep Roc Records. The songs are "re-covers" from his first four albums: Loudon Wainwright III (1970), Album II (1971), Album III (1972) and Attempted Mustache (1973).

== Track listing ==
1. "Black Uncle Remus"
2. "Saw Your Name in the Paper"
3. "School Days"
4. "Drinking Song"
5. "Motel Blues"
6. "Muse Blues"
7. "New Paint"
8. "Be Careful There's a Baby in the House"
9. "Needless to Say"
10. "Movies Are a Mother to Me"
11. "Say That You Love Me"
12. "Old Friend"
13. "The Man Who Couldn't Cry"

== Personnel ==
- Loudon Wainwright III - guitar, vocals
- Patrick Warren - keyboards
- David Piltch - bass guitar, double bass
- Jay Bellerose - drums
- Greg Leisz - guitar, lap steel guitar, pedal steel guitar, mandolin, mandola
- Joe Henry - guitar on "Say That You Love Me"
- Bill Frisell - electric guitar on "School Days" and "The Man Who Couldn't Cry"

== Charts ==
Chart performance for Recovery
Chart (2008)	Peak position
UK Independent Albums (OCC)	42
