= Haven't Got the Blues (Yet) =

Studio album by Loudon Wainwright III
- Released: July 28, 2014
- Genre: Folk
- Length: 48:07
- Label: Proper
- Producer: David Mansfield

Loudon Wainwright III chronology
| Older Than My Old Man Now (2012) | Haven't Got the Blues (Yet) (2014) | Surviving Twin (2017) |

Professional ratings
Aggregate scores
| Source | Rating |
|---|---|
| Metacritic | 83/100 |
Review scores
| Source | Rating |
| Exclaim! | (9/10) |
| MusicOMH | 4/5 stars |

Haven't Got the Blues (Yet) is the twenty-third studio album by American singer-songwriter Loudon Wainwright III. It was released on July 28, 2014, on Proper Records.

David Mansfield, who has been one of Wainwright's regular collaborators, produced the album. Wainwright has said of Mansfield: "I got to know L'il Davey about twenty-three years ago, on a flight back from Vancouver - I think - to New York. I've worked on and off with him ever since, on TV, in the recording studio, and on the road. He's been featured as a player and arranger on some of my best records, including History (1992), Grown Man (1995), Last Man on Earth (2001), and High Wide & Handsome (2009)."

All songs on Haven't Got the Blues (Yet) were written and composed by Loudon Wainwright III, except for "Harmless", which is by Michael Marra.

Dom Flemons played harmonica and jug on the album.

== Track listing ==
All tracks are written by Loudon Wainwright III, except "Harmless" by Michael Marra.

| No. | Title | Length |
|---|---|---|
| 1. | "Brand New Dance" | 3:35 |
| 2. | "Spaced" | 3:56 |
| 3. | "In a Hurry" | 5:16 |
| 4. | "Depression Blues" | 3:48 |
| 5. | "The Morgue" | 1:54 |
| 6. | "Harmless" | 3:35 |
| 7. | "Man & Dog" | 3:56 |
| 8. | "Harlan County" | 3:04 |
| 9. | "I Knew Your Mother" | 2:57 |
| 10. | "Looking at the Calendar" | 3:15 |
| 11. | "I'll Be Killing You This Christmas" | 3:34 |
| 12. | "God & Nature" | 3:28 |
| 13. | "Haven't Got the Blues (Yet)" | 3:24 |
| 14. | "Last Day of the Year" | 2:25 |

== Charts ==
Chart performance for Haven't Got the Blues (Yet)
| Chart (2014) | Peak position |
|---|---|
| UK Independent Albums (Official Charts) | 20 |
| US Heatseekers Albums (Billboard) | 10 |
| Scottish Albums (Official Charts) | 94 |
| Belgian Albums (Ultratop Wallonia) | 117 |
| US Americana/Folk Albums (Billboard) | 6 |
