= Career Moves =

Live album by Loudon Wainwright III
- Released: 1993
- Recorded: January 8, 1993
- Venue: The Bottom Line (New York City)
- Genre: Folk
- Length: 73:52
- Label: Virgin
- Producer: Loudon Wainwright III, Jeffrey Lesser

Loudon Wainwright III chronology
| History (1992) | Career Moves (1993) | Grown Man (1995) |

Professional ratings
Review scores
| Source | Rating |
|---|---|
| AllMusic | 4.5/5 stars |
| Robert Christgau | A |

Career Moves is the second live album by Loudon Wainwright III, released on July 1, 1993, on Virgin Records. The album predominantly features material culled from Wainwright's 1980s output, alongside six new songs, and one track from his then-recent album, History (1992). In the album's liner notes, Wainwright states: "To celebrate my silver jubilee, twenty-five years of earning a damn good living on the periphery of the music business, I give you this live record done in one night at The Bottom Line in New York City, my home town."

Wainwright is joined by musicians David Mansfield and Chaim Tannenbaum during the performance.

== Track listing ==
1. "Road Ode" – 5:09
2. "I'm Alright" – 3:00
3. "Five Years Old" – 3:08
4. "Your Mother and I" – 2:29
5. "Westchester County" – 3:20
6. "He Said, She Said" – 3:30
7. "Christmas Rap" – 0:27
8. "Suddenly It's Christmas" – 2:23
9. "Thanksgiving" – 4:51
10. "A Fine Celtic Name" – 2:57
11. "T.S.M.N.W.A." – 3:28
12. "Some Balding Guys" – 1:28
13. "The Swimming Song" – 2:26
14. "Absence Makes The Heart Grow Fonder" – 3:00
15. "Happy Birthday Elvis" – 2:47
16. "Fabulous Songs" – 0:26
17. "Unhappy Anniversary" – 2:54
18. "I'd Rather Be Lonely" – 2:59
19. "Just Say No" – 0:33
20. "April Fool's Day Morn" – 4:14
21. "The Man Who Couldn't Cry" – 5:04
22. "The Acid Song" – 5:55
23. "Tip That Waitress" – 4:15
24. "Career Moves" – 3:09
- Tracks 1, 6, 8, 11, 15 and 23 are premiere appearances.
- Tracks 7, 10, 12, 16 and 19 are spoken word segues.
- Tracks 13 and 21 originally appeared on the 1973 album Attempted Mustache.
- Track 14 originally appeared on the 1979 album Unrequited.
- Tracks 3, 5 and 20 originally appeared on the 1983 album Fame and Wealth.
- Tracks 2 and 24 originally appeared on the 1985 album I'm Alright.
- Tracks 4, 17 and 22 originally appeared on the 1986 album More Love Songs.
- Track 9 originally appeared on the 1989 album Therapy.
- Track 18 originally appeared on the 1992 album History.

== Release history ==
- CD: Virgin CDV2718
