= Live at the Cactus Cafe =

Live at the Cactus Cafe may refer to:

- Live at the Cactus Cafe (Marc Gunn album), a live album by Marc Gunn.
- Live at the Cactus Cafe (Loudon Wainwright III album), a live album by American singer-songwriter Loudon Wainwright III.
