= Scott Hull (engineer) =

American audio engineer

Scott E. Hull
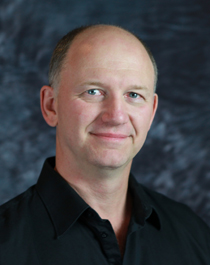

Background information
- Occupation: Mastering engineer
- Years active: 1983–present

Scott E. Hull (born January 28, 1962) is an American mastering engineer based in New York City, and the owner of Masterdisk.

== Biography ==
Hull began his career as an intern at Masterdisk in 1983. He became Bob Ludwig's assistant in 1984, and was promoted to chief engineer in 1994. In this first part of his career at Masterdisk Hull mastered albums for the following artists: Donald Fagen, Miles Davis, Bruce Springsteen, Spacehog, Congreso, Ani DiFranco, Lemonheads, Garbage, Shawn Mullins and multiple titles on the Luaka Bop label.

Hull remained chief engineer until 1999 when he left Masterdisk and moved to Classic Sound. While at Classic Sound Hull mastered the Grammy winning Steely Dan album Two Against Nature and the John Mayer album Room for Squares. Hull left Classic Sound when he was approached by The Hit Factory, where he stayed until they shut down in early 2005. While at The Hit Factory Hull mastered albums for Amy Grant, Skillet, Edie Brickell, and John Zorn.

When the Hit Factory closed, Hull became chief engineer at Jigsaw Sound. After Jigsaw, Hull opened his own company, Scott Hull Mastering. In an interview with the Rain Computers website, Hull explained his decision to start his own company:

This is really a continuation of all of the things I have been doing with music for the past 25 years. It was finally time to open my own shop and set up a mastering room that catered to the music business as it exists today. Cost conscious Major labels and the growing trend of independently produced mass-market music – that's where the next generation of music will emerge.

Hull returned to Masterdisk in 2008, when he purchased the business from then-CEO, Doug Levine. About the acquisition of the company Hull said, "I felt that Masterdisk was a flagship mastering studio that could be rejuvenated to be as profound as it once had been." Hull also said that he planned "an enthusiastic re-dedication to the 'excellent customer service, spread around multiple rooms' that characterized Masterdisk in the 1970s and 80s."

Other albums Scott Hull has mastered:

- Uncle Tupelo Anodyne (1993)
- Congreso Por amor al viento (1995)
- Herbie Hancock The New Standard (1996)
- Os Mutantes Everything Is Possible: The Best of Os Mutantes (1999)
- Derek Bailey Pieces for Guitar (2002)
- Lazlo Bane Guilty Pleasures (2007)
- Sharon Jones & The Dap-Kings 100 Days, 100 Nights (2007)
- Panic! at the Disco Pretty. Odd. (2008)
- Loudon Wainwright III High Wide & Handsome: The Charlie Poole Project (2009)
- Lou Reed Metal Machine Music (2009 reissue)
- Hawthorne Heights Skeletons (2010)
- John Zorn (The Moonchild Trio) Ipsissimus (2010)
- Sting Symphonicities (2010)
- Laurie Anderson Homeland (2010)
- Chiodos Illuminaudio (2010)
- John Zorn In Search of the Miraculous (2010)
- The Book of Mormon: Original Broadway Cast Recording (2011)
- Loudon Wainwright III Older Than My Old Man Now (2012)
