= Thomas Jefferson Kaye =

- Also known as: Tommy Kontos; Tommy Kaye
- Born: Thomas Jefferson Kontos; 1940/42; North Dakota, United States
- Died: September 16, 1994 (age 51/53) Warwick, New York, United States
- Occupations: Record producer, singer-songwriter
- Years active: 1956–1992
- Labels: Scepter, ABC-Dunhill, RSO
- Formerly of: Gene Clark, others

Thomas Jefferson Kontos (1940 – September 16, 1994), better known as Thomas Jefferson Kaye, was an American record producer, singer-songwriter and musician. He collaborated with The Shirelles, Loudon Wainwright III, and Gene Clark, and also recorded solo albums.

== Life and career ==
He claimed to have been born in North Dakota in 1940, though some sources suggest a date around 1942. By 1956, when known as Tommy Kontos, he started a vocal group, The Blaretones, in New York City, before forming a new group, the Rock-Abouts, the following year. They changed their name to The Ideals in 1958, and recorded two singles for Decca Records. The group regularly backed singer Joey Dee, before he formed the Starliters.

Kontos then joined Scepter Records as an A&R man, reputedly at the age of 18, and changed his name to Kaye at the suggestion of company owner Florence Greenberg. During the 1960s, he wrote and produced material at Scepter and its subsidiary Wand Records for The Shirelles (for whom he co-wrote their 1966 single "Shades of Blue"), Judy Clay, Maxine Brown, Chuck Jackson, The Kingsmen, and others. He reportedly also worked with ? and the Mysterians during this period, though suggestions that he produced their hit "96 Tears" have been discounted by music historian Dave Marsh. Kaye co-wrote the song "One Man Band", which was recorded by Three Dog Night on their 1970 album Naturally and became a hit single. He also co-produced the album Capture the Moment by Jay and the Americans, with session musicians including Donald Fagen and Walter Becker, later of Steely Dan. In the late 1960s and early 1970s Kaye performed regularly in Greenwich Village with a band, White Cloud, who also appeared on many of his record productions. The band included fiddler Kenny Kosek, and released a self-titled album on the small Good Medicine label in 1972. About the same time, Kaye was commissioned by Columbia Records to produce the third album by Loudon Wainwright III. This produced the hit single "Dead Skunk", and raised Kaye's profile.

Kaye moved to San Francisco in the early 1970s, to produce Link Wray's album Be What You Want To. There, he "fell in love with Wally Heider's studio and with the air-conditioned San Francisco climate and with the hills and with the cable cars...". He settled in California, and was signed by David Geffen to produce his friend Bob Neuwirth's self-titled 1974 debut solo album, recorded in Los Angeles with a variety of top musicians including Kris Kristofferson, Rita Coolidge, Bob Dylan, Don Everly and Rick Danko. Kaye said of that time: "The hours are crazy, the alcohol thing is crazy, the pills are crazy, the people are crazy... I was just as high as everybody else and I was up for it!"

"Like the Triumvirate album he produced for John Hammond, Mike Bloomfield, and Dr. John, Kaye's debut was sensually laid-back, with a sly intelligence he hoped to pass off as an active relationship with his environment. But this one stands beside Eric Clapton's 461 Ocean Boulevard as a critique of the laid-back mode."

— Review of First Grade in Christgau's Record Guide: Rock Albums of the Seventies (1981)

In 1973, Kaye produced the album Triumvirate by Mike Bloomfield, John Hammond Jr., and Dr. John and recorded his own debut solo album, Thomas Jefferson Kaye. The solo album was released by ABC-Dunhill Records, featured both Fagen and Becker, and was produced by Gary Katz who also produced Steely Dan. Kaye's second album, First Grade, used the same musicians and producer, and contained two songs written by Becker and Fagen, "Jones" and "American Lovers", the latter a "farewell" to the era's counterculture.

Kaye then began working with Gene Clark, formerly of The Byrds, on Clark's fourth solo album, No Other. Produced with a vast array of session musicians and backing singers, the album was an extraordinary amalgam of country rock, folk, gospel, soul and choral music with poetic, mystical lyrics. It was praised by critics, but its production costs of $100,000 which yielded only eight tracks prompted Geffen to berate Clark and Kaye. Kaye also produced Clark's next album, Two Sides to Every Story, released on the RSO label in 1977, before joining Clark and others to form the K.C. Southern Band ("K.C." representing Kaye and Clark). The band toured Europe alongside the separate bands led by Chris Hillman and Roger McGuinn, but split up after returning to the US.Kaye continued to work with Clark on the latter's studio albums, including Firebyrd in 1987.

In later years, Kaye suffered from alcohol and drug dependency, and from illnesses including diabetes. His final album, Not Alone, came out in 1992 and featured a guest line-up that included Eric Clapton, Dr. John, Steve Miller, Rick Danko, Timothy B. Schmit, Joe Walsh and Robby Krieger. He died in hospital in Warwick, New York, in 1994, after apparently taking an overdose of painkillers.

Kaye's son Chris Kontos has been a drummer for several metal bands, including Machine Head, playing on their acclaimed 1994 debut album Burn My Eyes.

== Discography (as singer-songwriter) ==
- Thomas Jefferson Kaye (1973)
- First Grade (1974)
- Not Alone (1992)
