= Live One =

Live One may refer to:

- Live One (Coil album), 2003
- Live One (Dragon album), 1985
- Live One (Tommy Emmanuel album), 2005
- LiveOne, a music streaming platform, 2007
- Live!! +one, an EP by Iron Maiden, 1980

== See also ==
- Live Ones, or Live in Japan, an album by Harem Scarem, 1996
- A Live One, an album by Phish, 1995
- A Live One (Loudon Wainwright III album), 1979
- The Live One, an album by Greg Brown, 1995
