= So Damn Happy =

So Damn Happy may refer to:

- So Damn Happy (Loudon Wainwright III album), 2003
- So Damn Happy (Aretha Franklin album), 2003
