= Little Ship =

Little Ship may refer to

- The Little Ships of Dunkirk, vessels that took part in the Dunkirk evacuation in 1940
- Little Ship (album), a 1997 album by Loudon Wainwright III
- The Little Ship Club, a yacht club
