= A Live One (Loudon Wainwright III album) =

Live album by Loudon Wainwright III
- Released: 1979
- Recorded: 1976, 1978
- Genre: Folk
- Length: 35:58
- Label: Rounder (US); Radar (UK)
- Producer: John Wood; Loudon Wainwright III

Loudon Wainwright III chronology
Final Exam (1978)	A Live One (1979)	Fame and Wealth (1983)

Professional ratings
Review scores
Source	Rating
Allmusic	link
Robert Christgau	B+ link
Rolling Stone	favorable link

A Live One is a live album by American singer-songwriter Loudon Wainwright III. The live performances included on the album were recorded on a tour of the British Isles in 1976 and at McCabe's in Los Angeles in 1978. It was released in 1979 on Rounder Records.

His first completely live album, it was released during the longest hiatus between studio albums so far in his career (five years): his farewell to the 1970s (1978's Final Exam) and his self-reinvention on 1983's Fame and Wealth. Furthermore, since the track list relies on early LPs such as Attempted Mustache, the gap between his adjacent studio albums seems all the wider.

== Track listing ==
All tracks composed by Loudon Wainwright III; except where indicated

1. "Motel Blues" – 3:28
2. "Hollywood Hopeful" – 1:25
3. "Whatever Happened to Us" – 1:35
4. "Natural Disaster" – 2:03
5. "Suicide Song" – 2:22
6. "School Days" – 3:16
7. "Kings and Queens" (Loudon Wainwright III, George Gerdes) – 2:37
8. "Down Drinking at the Bar" – 3:57
9. "B-Side" – 2:08
10. "Nocturnal Stumblebutt" – 4:19
11. "Red Guitar" – 1:54
12. "Clockwork Chartreuse" – 4:10
13. "Lullaby" – 2:44

Track 1 was recorded at Birmingham Town Hall, England; Autumn 1976.
Tracks 2, 7, 8, 9, 10 and 13 were recorded at McCabes Guitar Shop, Los Angeles, California during weekend engagement October 1978.
Tracks 3, 4, 5, and 12 were recorded at The New Vic, London, England; Autumn 1976.
Track 6 was recorded at The Apollo, Glasgow, Scotland; Autumn 1976.
Track 11 was recorded at Manchester Opera House, England; Autumn 1976.

== Release history ==
- LP: Rounder 3050 (U.S.)
- LP: Radar RAD24 (UK)
- CD: Edsel EDCD223
