= I'd Rather Lead a Band =

2020 album by Loudon Wainwright III

Studio album by Loudon Wainwright III
- Released: 2020

Loudon Wainwright III chronology
Surviving Twin (2017)	I'd Rather Lead a Band (2020)	Lifetime Achievement (2022)

I'd Rather Lead a Band is an album by Loudon Wainwright III, released in 2020. The album has songs by Harold Arlen, Frank Loesser, Rodgers and Hart, and Fats Waller.

== Track listing ==
1. "How I Love You (I'm Tellin' the Birds, Tellin' the Bees)" 03:26
2. "A Ship Without a Sail" 03:57
3. "Ain't Misbehavin'" 03:04
4. "I'm Going to Give It to Mary With Love" 03:16
5. "The Little Things in Life" 03:34
6. "So the Bluebirds and the Blackbirds Got Together" 02:53
7. "A Perfect Day" 02:40
8. "I Thought About You" 02:48
9. "I'd Rather Lead a Band" 03:41
10. "My Blue Heaven" 02:52
11. "Between the Devil and the Deep Blue Sea" 03:06
12. "Heart and Soul" 02:38
13. "You Rascal You (I'll Be Glad When You're Dead)" 02:59
14. "More I Cannot Wish You" 03:05

== Charts ==
Chart performance for I'd Rather Lead a Band
Chart (2020)	Peak position
US Top Jazz Albums (Billboard)	20
