= 10 Songs for the New Depression =

2010 studio album by Loudon Wainwright III

Studio album by Loudon Wainwright III
- Released: July 19, 2010
- Genre: Folk; pop rock
- Length: 30:00
- Label: Proper

Loudon Wainwright III chronology
High Wide & Handsome: The Charlie Poole Project (2009)	10 Songs for the New Depression (2010)	Older Than My Old Man Now (2012)

10 Songs for the New Depression is the twenty-first studio album by American singer-songwriter Loudon Wainwright III, released on July 19, 2010 in the United Kingdom and July 27, 2010 in the United States, through Proper Records. Released forty years following his first studio album, 10 Songs is Wainwright's first album since his Grammy Award-winning tribute project High Wide & Handsome: The Charlie Poole Project (2009). The concept album was inspired by the 2008 financial crisis and the Great Recession, and features Wainwright backed by his own banjo, guitar and ukulele performances.

Wainwright began writing songs for the album following the inauguration of Barack Obama in January 2009. The album features ten original songs and two cover versions of songs originally written and recorded during the Great Depression. Lyrical references throughout 10 Songs include economists Alan Greenspan, John Maynard Keynes and Paul Krugman, President Barack Obama, and the government program Car Allowance Rebate System (more commonly known as "cash for clunkers"). Overall, the critical reception of the album was positive. 10 Songs reached peak positions of number thirty-eight on the United Kingdom's Top Independent Albums chart and number twelve on the Top 40 Independent Albums Breakers chart.

== Development and promotion ==
Wainwright began writing songs for the album following the January 2009 inauguration of Barack Obama. In January 2010, Wainwright said of the album:

As of this writing some folks are saying things are looking up recession wise and this particular hard time might be ending. Other experts are saying we're in for a "double-dip" and there's more feces heading toward the national and global fans. If that's the case I'd like to cash in. So buddy if you can spare a few bucks, please enjoy 10 Songs for the New Depression!

On February 22, The New Yorker featured a video of Wainwright performing "The Krugman Blues" and complimenting the publication's March 2010 article which profiled economist Paul Krugman. Part of "Cash for Clunkers" was featured in a segment of NPR's program Car Talk. Wainwright was able to promote the album by touring both before and after the album's release. The Loud and Rich Tour, which co-headlined Wainwright and long-time friend Richard Thompson, began in the fall of 2009 and continued into 2011.

== Composition ==
I've been thinking for years now that nothing really bad would happen to me in what's left of my life time. I dodged the draft (Vietnam) and miraculously drifted into a fun and rewarding career. Divorce, guilt, and the death of a parent have been about as bad as it's gotten for me in 63 years. What luck! Even 9/11 and most certainly Darfur seem at a remove from my actual existence. It's strange then that towards the end of said existence there's been a kind of catastrophic feeling in the air. Rather exciting and certainly something to write and sing about.

— Loudon Wainwright III, liner notes for "Fear Itself"

10 Songs for the New Depression is a simple vocal and acoustic performance album composed of original songs as well as two cover versions of songs from the Great Depression. The album is approximately thirty minutes in length and contains lyrical references to economist Alan Greenspan, Nobel Prize-winning economist and The New York Times columnist Paul Krugman, and President Barack Obama. While Wainwright's previous studio album High Wide & Handsome: The Charlie Poole Project (2009) contains more than twenty musicians and singers, The Guardian contributor Robin Denselow described 10 Songs as featuring a "pared-down, DIY set, in keeping with the mood of the new songs".

The opening track, "Times Is Hard", features "bleak" lyrics about "nihilism [being] used as a tool to remedy social ills" sung to upbeat melodies. Wainwright wrote the song following the inauguration of Barack Obama. "House" is about economics and relationships, and tells the story of a couple wanting to divorce but staying together because they cannot sell their house. In the liner notes, Wainwright admitted that at the time the album was released he "remained relatively unscathed by the New Depression" but owned a house in Southern California that he was unable to sell. "On to Victory, Mr. Roosevelt" and "The Panic Is On" were both originally written during the Great Depression. Circa 1933, Texas politician W. Lee O'Daniel wrote and recorded the former. Medicine show performer Hezekiah Jenkins originally wrote and recorded "The Panic Is On".

"Fear Itself" is about being fired "from the job you always professed to hate" and contains a reference to John Maynard Keynes. "The Krugman Blues" references the "gloomy mien of one's favourite economic pundit", Paul Krugman, whom Wainwright met on a train to Boston. Wainwright believed Krugman's sense of melancholy made for a "compelling and challenging character". "Spooky" sound effects, suggested by Dick Connette, were added to the track "Halloween 2009". Wainwright wrote "Middle of the Night" a few years prior to the album's release in an attempt to "cheer [himself] up and also to purvey an optimistic point of view for a change". "Cash for Clunkers" refers to the Car Allowance Rebate System, a United States federal scrappage program active during summer 2009. "Got a Ukulele" features Wainwright performing the titular instrument, which he believes was popular during the 1920s–1930s due to its ability to improve "one's mood and general outlook".

== Reception ==
Professional ratings
Review scores
Source	Rating
The Daily Telegraph	3/5 stars
The Guardian	4/5 stars
The Independent	3/5 stars
Metro	3/5 stars
PopMatters	7/10 stars

Critical reception of the album was positive overall. Robin Denselow of The Guardian awarded the album four of five stars and wrote that Wainwright's performance sounded as "easy-going and spontaneous" as it does at his live concerts. Denselow considered "House" to be the album's best track. The Daily Telegraph's Colin Irwin described the album as "oddly uplifting" despite its "variants on the theme that we're all doomed" from the economic crisis. The Observer contributor Neil Spencer wrote that "while [Wainwright's] tone becomes shrill at times, his mix of nihilism and jauntiness (with ukulele) are finally uplifting." Music journalist Andy Gill of The Independent recommended the tracks "House", "Fear Itself " and "The Panic Is On". Simmy Richman's review for The Independent complimented Wainwright's ability to address current issues "simply and effectively", claiming "Wainwright can make you laugh, nod in agreement, shake your fist in despair and want to sing along". Richman appreciated Wainwright's honesty and humor and wrote that he displayed "better lyrical form than he has been in for some time". The Independent included 10 Songs on their "Indy Choice: Best of the New Music" list for the week of July 16, 2010. PopMatters's Alex Ramon preferred Wainwright's album Social Studies (1999), but considered 10 Songs to be "an enjoyable effort nonetheless", complimenting it for its simple approach. Furthermore, Ramon wrote that the album "succeeds in getting you smiling rather than despairing at the mess we're in, and that's always been one of Wainwright's great gifts".

== Track listing ==
All tracks written by Loudon Wainwright III, unless noted otherwise.

1. "Times Is Hard" – 2:55
2. "House" – 4:19
3. "On to Victory, Mr. Roosevelt" (W. Lee O'Daniel) – 2:35
4. "Fear Itself" – 2:34
5. "The Panic Is On" (Hezekiah Jenkins) – 2:56
6. "The Krugman Blues" – 3:11
7. "Halloween 2009" – 2:40
8. "Middle of the Night" – 3:09
9. "Cash for Clunkers" – 3:02
10. "Got a Ukulele" – 2:39

== Chart history ==
10 Songs for the New Depression debuted and reached its peak position at number thirty-eight on the United Kingdom's Top Independent Albums chart the week of July 31, 2010. That same week the album debuted at number twelve on the Top 40 Independent Albums Breakers chart. 10 Songs fell to number eighteen on the Top 40 Independent Albums Breakers chart the week of August 7, 2010.

== Charts ==
Chart performance for 10 Songs for the New Depression
Chart (2010)	Peak position
UK Independent Albums (OCC)	38

== Release history ==
Region	Date	Label	Format	Catalog
United Kingdom	July 19, 2010	Proper Records	Compact Disc	PRPCD069

== See also ==
- Causes of the Great Recession
- Occupy This Album, the 2012 compilation box set containing 99 songs inspired by the Occupy movement, including "The Panic Is On"
- Timeline of the Great Depression
- Wall Street crash of 1929
