= Lifetime Achievement (album) =

Studio album by Loudon Wainwright III
- Released: August 19, 2022
- Studio: Hobo Sound; 2nd Story Sound; Restoration Sound
- Genre: Folk
- Length: 53:01
- Label: Proper
- Producer: Dick Connette; Stewart Lerman; Loudon Wainwright III

Loudon Wainwright III chronology
I'd Rather Lead a Band (2020)	Lifetime Achievement (2022)

Lifetime Achievement is the twenty-fifth studio album by American singer-songwriter Loudon Wainwright III, released on August 19, 2022, on Proper Records. Co-produced by regular collaborators Dick Connette and Stewart Lerman, the album is Wainwright's first to feature original material since the release of Haven't Got the Blues (Yet) in 2014.

Written as Wainwright enters "chronologically [his] last years", the album features a mostly stripped-back acoustic aesthetic.

== Writing and composition ==
The album's lyrical content covers the COVID-19 pandemic, family life, and experiences and reflections from the perspective of Wainwright in his 70s. Regarding the album's overall positive attitude, Wainwright noted: "There are a number of songs that would make you wonder what’s happened here. It’s not the usual cynical nihilist that we’ve grown to love over the years. There is an optimism. The last few years have been good to me."

After spending two years isolated on Long Island during the COVID-19 pandemic, the track "Town & Country" details Wainwright's experiences and observations upon returning to New York City following the several lockdowns. Rolling Stone described the track as a “sardonic" folk song that represented an emerging genre of songwriting called "covid-pop".

The album's penultimate track, "How Old is 75?", features Wainwright musing on his forthcoming 75th birthday. Upon the album's release he noted: "I write about being poised on a high diving board in this song. Maybe I’m more relaxed now because it’s almost time to jump."

== Track listing ==
All tracks are written by Loudon Wainwright III.

No.	Title	Length
1.	"I Been"	2:16
2.	"One Wish"	2:15
3.	"It Takes 2"	4:54
4.	"Fam Vac"	3:57
5.	"Hell"	3:38
6.	"Little Piece of Me"	3:27
7.	"No Man's Land"	2:16
8.	"Back in Your Town"	4:26
9.	"Town & Country"	4:16
10.	"Island"	4:07
11.	"It"	2:17
12.	"Hat"	3:58
13.	"Lifetime Achievement"	3:26
14.	"How Old Is 75?"	4:31
15.	"Fun & Free"	3:09

== Charts ==
Chart performance for Lifetime Achievement
Chart (2022)	Peak position
Scottish Albums (OCC)	45
UK Album Sales (OCC)	59
UK Americana Albums (OCC)	3
UK Independent Albums (OCC)	19
