= BBC Sessions (Loudon Wainwright III album) =

Live album by Loudon Wainwright III
- Released: 1998
- Genre: Folk
- Label: Strange Fruit
- Producer: Dale Griffin, Dave Dade, John Walters, John Owen Williams, Kevin Howlett, Mike Hawkes, Nick Gomm, Paul Williams

Loudon Wainwright III chronology
Little Ship (1997)	BBC Sessions (1998)	Social Studies (1999)

Professional ratings
Review scores
Source	Rating
AllMusic	3/5 stars
The New Rolling Stone Album Guide	3.5/5 stars

BBC Sessions is a 1998 release by Loudon Wainwright III. It is a compilation of BBC Radio recordings from 1971 to 1993. "Sunday Times" makes its first recorded appearance on the compilation.

== Track listing ==
All tracks composed by Loudon Wainwright III

1. "Be Careful, There's a Baby in the House"
2. "East Indian Princess"
3. "Medley: I Know I'm Unhappy / Suicide Song / Glenville Reel"
4. "A.M. World"
5. "The Swimming Song"
6. "Prince Hal's Dirge"
7. "I Wish It Was Me"
8. "No"
9. "Hard Day on the Planet"
10. "You Don't Want to Know"
11. "Sunday Times"
12. "Nice Guys"
13. "Harry's Wall"
14. "Carmine Street"
15. "Number One"
16. "The Birthday Present [#1]"
17. "Men"
18. "A Father and a Son"
19. "School Days"
20. "It's Love and I Hate It"
21. "One Man Guy"

== Release history ==
- CD: Strange Fruit SFRSCD073, distributed by Pinnacle
- CD (U.S. release): Uni/Fuel 2000 (2000)
