= Final Exam (album) =

Studio album by Loudon Wainwright III
- Released: 1978
- Studio: MZH, New York City
- Genre: Folk
- Label: Arista
- Producer: John Lissauer

Loudon Wainwright III chronology
T Shirt (1976)	Final Exam (1978)	A Live One (1979)

Final Exam is an album by the American musician Loudon Wainwright III, released in 1978. He supported it with a North American tour. The album was re-released on Telarc in 2007, coupled with his 1976 album, T Shirt. In 1995, Wainwright acknowledged that it was his least favorite of his albums.

== Production ==
The album was produced by John Lissauer. Wainwright was backed by the band Slow Train. "Pretty Little Martha" is a tribute to his daughter Martha Wainwright. "Heaven and Mud" is about an attempt at sobriety. "Golfin' Blues" is about the golfing life, in the style of a Delta blues song. "Mr. Guilty" is a parody of the tropes of country music. The title track is addressed to a high school student taking spring semester exams.

== Critical reception ==
Professional ratings
Review scores
Source	Rating
AllMusic	3.5/5 stars
Christgau's Record Guide	B+
The Encyclopedia of Popular Music	2/5 stars

The New York Times wrote that Wainwright "deals primarily with a quirky kind of humor that seems almost to mask emotion." The Commercial Appeal considered Final Exam to be Wainwright's best, writing that he "operates without the philosophical cleverness of Randy Newman, preferring instead to use a straightforward, crazed style to push his point across." The Journal & Courier praised Wainwright's acoustic guitar playing.

The Arizona Daily Star noted Wainwright's "mind like a steel trap ... a warped steel trap." The Star Tribune opined that "the clever cynic ... has become a television sit-com writer." The Morning Call determined that Wainwright "furthers his reputation as an unconventional, witty songwriter ... but there are no real standouts."

In 1983, The Philadelphia Inquirer labeled the album "self-pitying and melodramatic." Reviewing the reissue, Music Week deemed it an "enjoyable [fusion] of his more traditional folk style with a harder, rockier edge."

== Track listing ==
All tracks composed by Loudon Wainwright III

1. "Final Exam"
2. "Mr. Guilty"
3. "Penpal Blues"
4. "Golfin' Blues"
5. "The Heckler"
6. "Natural Disaster"
7. "Fear with Flying"
8. "Heaven and Mud"
9. "Two-song Set"
10. "Pretty Little Martha"
11. "Watch Me Rock, I'm Over Thirty"

== Personnel ==
- Loudon Wainwright III - guitar, vocals

Slow Train

- Ron Getman - steel guitar, guitar, vocals
- John Crowder - bass, vocals
- Glen Mitchell - keyboards, vocals
- Stephen Tubin - keyboards
- Richard Crooks - drums, percussion

with:

- Arlen Roth - slide guitar
- John Hall - guitar
- Eric Weissberg - banjo
- Errol "Crusher" Bennett - percussion
- Kenny Kosek - violin
- John Lissauer - clarinet
- Hugh McCracken - guitar
- Larry Packer - violin
- The Roches - backing vocals

Technical

- Harvey Hoffman - recording and mixing engineer
- Peter Cunningham - cover photography

== Release history ==
- LP: Arista AB4173 (U.S.)
- LP: Arista SPART1042 (UK)
- LP: Poopik Productions AB4173 (Europe)
