= Strange Weirdos =

Strange Weirdos: Music from and Inspired by the film Knocked Up

Soundtrack album by Loudon Wainwright III
- Released: May 22, 2007
- Recorded: by Ryan Freeland at The Garfield House, South Pasadena, California, U.S.A., except track 3 - by S. Husky Höskulds at Sunset Sound Factory, Hollywood, mixed by R.Freeland
- Genre: Contemporary folk, folk-rock, americana
- Length: 48:17
- Label: Concord
- Producer: Joe Henry, Loudon Wainwright III

Loudon Wainwright III chronology
Here Come the Choppers (2005)	Strange Weirdos: Music from and Inspired by the film Knocked Up (2007)	Recovery (2008)

Professional ratings
Review scores
Source	Rating
AllMusic	4.5/5 stars
Robert Christgau	B+ link
Music Box	link

Strange Weirdos: Music from and Inspired by the Film Knocked Up is the official soundtrack album to the 2007 Judd Apatow film Knocked Up, and the eighteenth studio album by American singer-songwriter Loudon Wainwright III, released on May 22, 2007, on Concord Records. The album was co-produced by Joe Henry and Wainwright. Guests featured on the album include multi-instrumentalist Greg Leisz, Van Dyke Parks, bassist David Pilch, Richard Thompson and Patrick Warren.

In 2007 Strange Weirdos reached peak positions of number 32 on Billboard's Top Heatseekers chart and number 22 on the Top Soundtracks chart. The album re-entered the Top Soundtracks chart in 2009, reaching a peak position of number 15.

== Development ==
Strange Weirdos served as the soundtrack to Judd Apatow's 2007 film Knocked Up and a studio album for Wainwright, who played a gynecologist in the film.

== Track listing ==
All songs written by Wainwright unless noted otherwise.

1. "Grey in L.A." – 3:15
2. "You Can't Fail Me Now" (Joe Henry, Wainwright) – 3:45
3. "Daughter" (Peter Blegvad) – 3:33
4. "Ypsilanti" (Henry) – 1:52
5. "So Much to Do" (Henry, Wainwright) – 3:26
6. "Valley Morning" – 3:44
7. "X or Y" – 2:54
8. "Final Frontier" – 3:47
9. "Feel So Good" (Mose Allison) – 2:03
10. "Lullaby" – 3:12
11. "Naomi" (Henry) – 4:04
12. "Doin' the Math" – 5:32
13. "Strange Weirdos" – 4:07
14. "Passion Play" – 2:54

== Personnel ==
Musicians

- Jay Bellerose – drums, percussion
- Jebin Bruni – organ (7), piano (13)
- Daphne Chen – second violin of The Section Quartet (2, 8, 13)
- Richard Dodd – cello of The Section Quartet (2, 8, 13)
- Eric Gorfain – first violin of The Section Quartet (2, 8, 13)
- Portia Griffin – backing vocals (7, 12)
- Niki Haris – backing vocals (7, 12)
- Joe Henry – acoustic guitar (4,11), record producer
- Leah Katz – viola of The Section Quartet (2, 8, 13)
- Greg Leisz – acoustic guitar, electric guitar, lap steel guitar, pedal steel guitar, Weissenborn steel guitar, mandolin, mandola,
- Jean McClain – backing vocals (7, 12)
- Van Dyke Parks – accordion (1, 3, 14), piano (5)
- David Piltch – acoustic bass, electric bass
- Richard Thompson – electric guitar (1, 8, 10)
- Loudon Wainwright III – vocals, guitars, ukulele, record producer
- Patrick Warren – piano, pump organ, Chamberlin, accordion; string arrangements and conductor of The Section Quartet

Production

- Judd Apatow – executive producer, liner notes
- John Baldi – A&R
- David Buntz – album director for Universal Pictures
- Ryan Freeland – engineer, mixing
- Harry Garfield – executive in charge of music for Universal Pictures
- S. Husky Höskulds – engineer (3)
- Jonathan Karp – music supervisor
- Gavin Lurssen – mastering
- Kathy Nelson – executive in charge of music for Universal Pictures
- Rob Saslow – A&R
- Anabel Sinn – design
- Michael Wilson – photography

== Charts ==
Chart performance for Strange Weirdos
Chart (2007)	Peak position
UK Soundtrack Albums (OCC)	9
US Heatseekers Albums (Billboard)	32
US Soundtrack Albums (Billboard)	15
