= Sloan Wainwright =

American musician (born 1957)

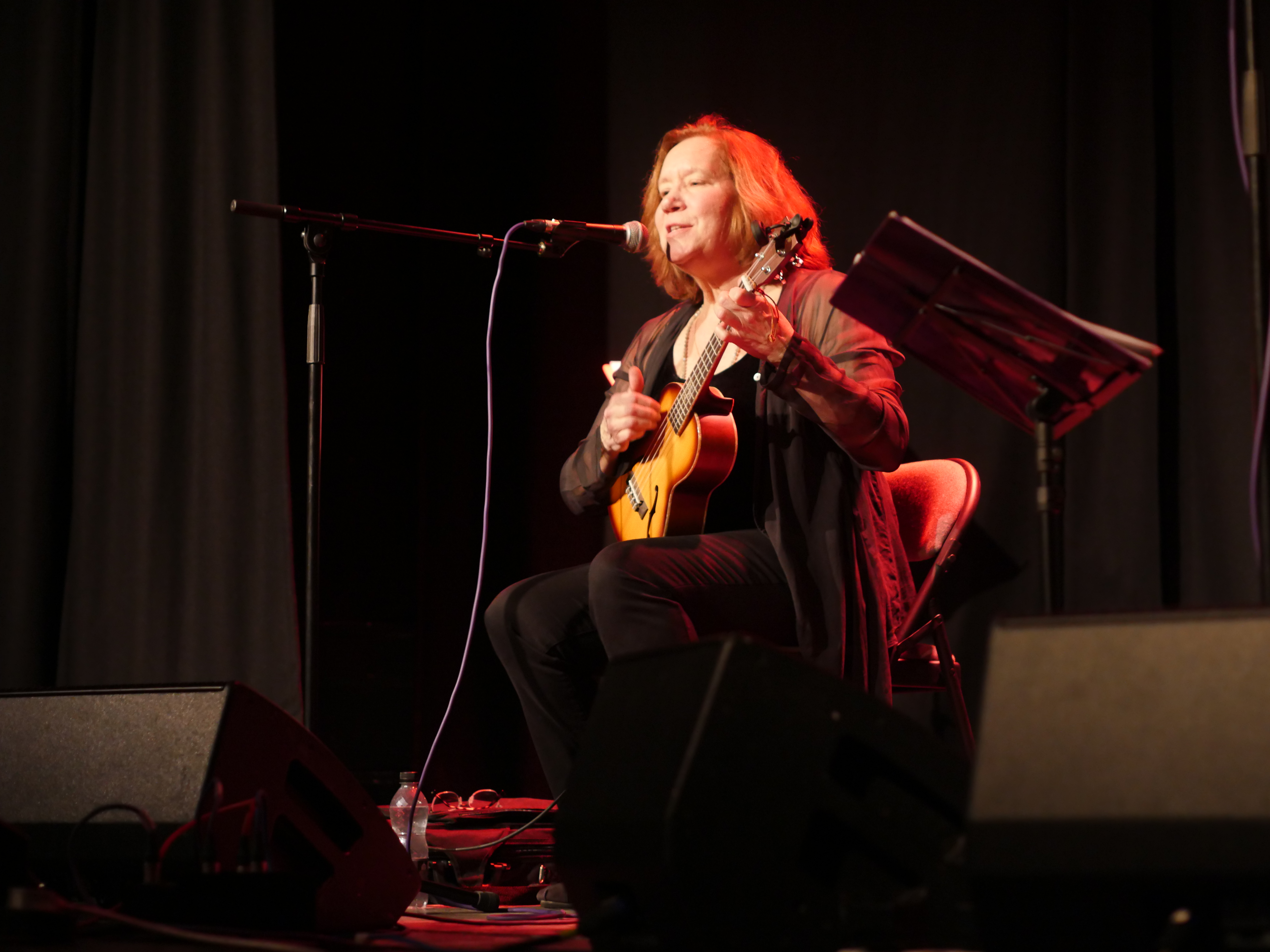
- Sloan Wainwright performing at the Chapel Arts Centre on January 26, 2020

Background information
- Born: 1957 (age 68–69)
- Origin: Bedford, New York, U.S.
- Genres: Folk, rock, blues, comedy
- Occupations: Artist, singer-songwriter
- Instruments: Vocals
- Website: sloanwainwright.com
- relations: Loudon Wainwright III (brother); Martha Wainwright (niece); Rufus Wainwright (nephew); Lucy Wainwright Roche (niece)

Sloan Wainwright (born 1957) is an American singer and songwriter. Her musical style consists of a combination of folk, rock, jazz, and blues, developed while writing and performing in the Greenwich Village area of New York City. She released 11 albums between 1996 and 2021.

== Life and career ==
Sloan Wainwright is the daughter of Loudon Wainwright Jr. and Martha Taylor. She is the younger sister of Loudon Wainwright III, and aunt to Canadian-American musicians Martha Wainwright and Rufus Wainwright, and American musician Lucy Wainwright Roche.

She was married to George McTavey who died in December 2008 after a long illness. They had two sons.

As a performer, Wainwright is known for her contralto voice. Her musical style combines pop, folk, jazz, and blues. Born into a musical family, her teenage years were influenced by a constant flow of diverse artists, writers and musicians. She developed her songwriting style while writing and performing in the Greenwich Village scene,

In the mid-1990s, Sloan began a collaboration with guitarist Stephen Murphy. They assembled a band, and Sloan released a self-titled debut CD in 1996, 'Sloan Wainwright'. The Sloan Wainwright Band followed with a second release in 1998, a tribute in memory of Wainwright's mother Martha, entitled 'From Where You Are.' The third band release in early 2001,The Song Inside, merged traditionally-based folk music with more eccentric variations. In 2003 she released Cool Morning, featuring her rendition of U2's "Where The Streets Have No Name".

== Discography ==
Red Maple Tree (2021)

1. "Two Sticks"
2. "When I Have Nothing"
3. "Red Maple Tree"
4. "In Times Like These"
5. "Spirit of Love"
6. "Still Life"
7. "Here You Are"
8. "The Keeper"
9. "In This House Two Heartbeats"
10. "Love's Last Touch"
11. "We Are The People"
12. "Help Each Other Through"
13. "The Gift You Gave to Love"
14. "Hard Candy"

Bright Side Of A Rainy Day (2016)

1. "If You Want To Be Happy"
2. "Bright Side Of A Rainy Day"
3. "Myles And Miles"
4. "Grace"
5. "My Hometown"
6. "Thinking Outside The Box"
7. "From This Day On"
8. "I Got Your Back"
9. "This I Know"
10. "Lonely For You"

Uncovering (2015)

1. "Dear George"
2. "Something So Right"
3. "Dreams Don't Count"
4. "Wedding Bell Blues"
5. "Truth Turns Like A Wheel"
6. "Conversation"
7. "First Time Ever I Saw Your Face"
8. "Ain't No Grave"
9. "On A Night Like This"
10. "This Isn't Kindness"
11. "My Door Is Always Open To You"

Upside Down & Under My Heart (2011)

1. "Living Out the Best of Your Life"
2. "Upside Down & Under My Heart"
3. "Here I Am"
4. "I Can See Now"
5. "Today"
6. "My Song"
7. "I Wear the Ring"
8. "Holland"
9. "Little Bit Right"
10. "I Am Free"

Rediscovery (2008)

1. "Time of No Reply"
2. "Ring of Fire"
3. "After the Gold Rush"
4. "Meet Me in the Morning"
5. "All Things Must Pass"
6. "Mercy Me (The Ecology)"
7. "There But for Fortune"
8. "Every Grain of Sand"
9. "Love"
10. "Sitting Here in Limbo"

Life Grows Back (2006)

1. "When I Walk Away"
2. "Tired of Wasting Time"
3. "Between the Lines"
4. "Wild in This World"
5. "Bad for Her"
6. "These Are the Days"
7. "The Baby and the Bathwater"
8. "Meet the Sun Halfway"
9. "Out of Her Hands"
10. "Viking Tree"
11. "Something That Comes Close"

On a Night Before Christmas (Live, 2005)

1. "Illuminate"
2. "2000 Miles"
3. "River"
4. "Blue Christmas"
5. "How Beautiful Are the Feet"
6. "Thank God It's Christmas"
7. "Silver Bells"
8. "O Come, O Come Emmanuel"
9. "We Three Guitarists"
10. "A Soalin'"
11. "Search the Sky"
12. "Christmas Is the Time to Say I Love You"
13. "Silent Night"

Cool Morning (2003)

1. "Cool Morning"
2. "Word of the Day"
3. "Good Day to Live"
4. "Illinois"
5. "Where the Streets Have No Name"
6. "Illuminate"
7. "I Spied You"
8. "Ready or Not"
9. "From Where You Are"
10. "Summertime"

The Song Inside (2001)

1. "Too Nice for Too Long"
2. "You Are the Feast"
3. "Wavelength"
4. "Bridgeburner"
5. "Falling Backwards"
6. "The Song Inside"
7. "Less Is More"
8. "Fall with Me"
9. "Freedom"
10. "Martha"
11. "Steven Leif"
12. "I Stand Up"
13. "Unseen Guide"

From Where You Are (1998)

1. "Mountain of Sense"
2. "I Eye the Lady"
3. "Psycho Pondering"
4. "Don't Go"
5. "Here Comes the Rain"
6. "For My Pride"
7. "My New Car"
8. "Lament"
9. "I Guess I Can"
10. "Unravel"
11. "Across the Universe"
12. "From Where You Are"

Sloan Wainwright (1996)

1. "Hey Girl"
2. "Unseen Guide"
3. "Box of Rain"
4. "Steal My Thunder"
5. "Poison Television"
6. "On a Windy Day (Baretrees)"
7. "Daddy's Water"
8. "Without"
9. "Arms Length"
10. "Our Love"
11. "Stand"
12. "I'm Only Listening"
