= Last Man on Earth (album) =

Studio album by Loudon Wainwright III
- Released: September 24, 2001
- Recorded: Shinebox Studios
- Genre: Folk rock
- Length: 37:45
- Label: Red House
- Producer: Stewart Lerman

Loudon Wainwright III chronology
Social Studies (1999)	Last Man on Earth (2001)	So Damn Happy (2003)

Professional ratings
Review scores
Source	Rating
AllMusic	link
Robert Christgau	link
PopMatters	favorable link

Last Man on Earth is the sixteenth studio album by American singer-songwriter Loudon Wainwright III, released on September 24, 2001, on Red House Records. Recorded in the wake of Wainwright's mother's death and the collapse of a romantic relationship, the album thematically addresses feelings of grief and loneliness. In 2012, Wainwright noted, "Last Man on Earth was written right after my mother died, so a lot of the material on that record has to do with that momentous event. The life circle was present on a lot of those songs."

Portions of the album also reflect upon Wainwright's troubled relationship with his father, Loudon Wainwright, Jr., a subject that has populated many of his earlier recordings. Last Man on Earth can be seen as a companion piece to his 1992 album, History, written after the death of his father.

== Background ==
In 1997, following his mother's funeral, Wainwright stayed in her home in Katonah, Westchester County for eighteen months. During this time, Wainwright wrote much of the album's material.

Last Man on Earth was released four years after Wainwright's mother's death. The working title for the album was Missing You, named after the album's opening track. However, the album's title ultimately became Last Man on Earth, a song written in Suffolk County following Wainwright's eventual move from his mother's old home.

== Track listing ==
1. "Missing You" – 3:29
2. "Living Alone" – 2:37
3. "White Winos" – 2:59
4. "Fresh Fossils" – 1:50
5. "I'm Not Gonna Cry" – 2:06
6. "Out of Reach" – 2:57
7. "Bridge" – 1:43
8. "Surviving Twin" – 3:41
9. "Donations" – 2:02
10. "Graveyard" – 2:13
11. "Bed" – 2:53
12. "Last Man on Earth" – 5:01
13. "Homeless" – 4:14

== Personnel ==
The following people contributed to Last Man on Earth:

Musicians

- Loudon Wainwright III – vocals, guitar, five-string banjo
- Stewart Lerman – guitars, bass, organ, Wurlitzer, percussion
- Dick Connette – piano, spinet, celeste, harmonium, percussion, arrangements
- Steuart Smith – electric guitar, acoustic guitar, piano, organ, Wurlitzer, accordion, bass, harmonica
- David Mansfield – fiddle, viola, mandolin, dulcimer, guitar, percussion, string arrangements on "White Winos"
- Sammy Merendino – drums, percussion
- Mary Rowell – violin, viola
- Marshall Coid – violin
- Dorothy Lawson – cello
- Brian Stanley – bass ("Living Alone")
- Johnny Gale – vocals and vocal arrangements ("Bridge")
- Little Isidore – vocals ("Bridge")
- Suzzy Roche – vocals ("Bed" and "Last Man on Earth")

Recording personnel

- Stewart Lerman – producer, recording, mixing
- Scott Lehrer – additional engineering ("Bed" and "Missing You")
- Dominick Maita – mastering

Artwork

- Deborah Feingold – inlay photograph
- Patti Perret – beach photos
- Don Stettner – back cover painting
- Hugh Brown – layout and design

== Charts ==
Chart	Peak position
US Independent Albums (Billboard)	44

== Release history ==
- CD: Red House 158
- CD: Evangeline 4025
- CD: Evangeline 4076
