= Here Come the Choppers =

Studio album by Loudon Wainwright III
- Released: April 19, 2005
- Genre: Folk rock
- Label: Sovereign
- Producer: Lee Townsend

Loudon Wainwright III chronology
So Damn Happy(2003)	Here Come the Choppers (2005)	Strange Weirdos (2007)

Professional ratings
Review scores
Source	Rating
AllMusic	4/5 stars
Robert Christgau	A−
BBC Music	–
PopMatters	6/10

Here Come the Choppers is a 2005 album by Loudon Wainwright III. The title track is an acerbic and blackly humorous reference to the Iraq War, reset in southern California's Miracle Mile.

"The inspectors found nothing
That’s just not right
Whole Foods and Kmart
Are targets tonight"

"Hank and Fred" is a real-life account of Wainwright driving to the grave of Hank Williams when he heard the news, on the car radio, of the death of children's TV host Fred Rogers.

"One New Years' Day Hank slipped away
Slumped over in the back
Oh, I hope he had his cardigan on
In that Cadillac"

The album is also notable for the recruitment of Bill Frisell on lead guitar.

The cover illustration is by Steve Vance.

== Track listing ==
All tracks composed by Loudon Wainwright III

1. "My Biggest Fan" – 6:02
2. "No Sure Way" – 5:29
3. "Had to Be Her" – 5:02
4. "Hank and Fred" – 4:55
5. "Half Fist" – 4:13
6. "To Be on TV" – 4:03
7. "God's Country" – 3:14
8. "Make Your Mother Mad" – 4:06
9. "When You Leave" – 5:22
10. "Nanny" – 3:12
11. "Here Come the Choppers" – 6:42
12. "Things" – 4:06

== Personnel ==
- Loudon Wainwright III - acoustic guitar, vocals
- Jim Keltner - drums, percussion
- Bill Frisell - electric guitar
- Greg Leisz - mandolin, pedal steel, electric & lap steel guitar
- David Piltch - electric & acoustic bass
- Coco Love Alcorn - vocals
- Chris Gestrin - Wurlitzer
- Shawn Pierce - engineer, audio engineer, mixing

== Release history ==
- CD: Sovereign Records
