= Older Than My Old Man Now =

Studio album by Loudon Wainwright III
- Released: April 17, 2012
- Genre: Folk
- Label: 2nd Story Sound
- Producer: Dick Connette

Loudon Wainwright III chronology
| 10 Songs for the New Depression (2010) | Older Than My Old Man Now (2012) | Haven't Got the Blues (Yet) (2014) |

Older Than My Old Man Now is the twenty-second studio album by American singer-songwriter Loudon Wainwright III, released on April 17, 2012, on 2nd Story Sound Records. Described as "a gleefully morbid summing up of [Wainwright's] life in which he ponders childhood, family history, aging and death," the album is produced by High Wide & Handsome: The Charlie Poole Project (2009) collaborator Dick Connette, and features contributions from each of Wainwright's children.

The album's title alludes to Wainwright's father, Loudon Wainwright, Jr., who was aged sixty-three upon his death. Upon the album's release, Wainwright noted, "When you’re sixty-five, everything seems to be somewhat in the rear-view, or at least in the side-view. Well, not everything, and hopefully your windshield wipers are still working."

== Writing and composition ==
Regarding one of the album's most prominent themes, death, Wainwright noted, "I'm also old enough to have a lot of friends that have died already, people I knew and was close to. The mother of my first two kids, Kate McGarrigle, died a couple of years ago. Friends, parents. So it becomes a powerful part of your life as you get older." Wainwright elaborated, "The whole album is about, in a sense, the handwriting on the wall for all of us, and that’s been the situation with the songs I've written throughout my career. Whether it’s declining powers or family skirmishes or too much hanging out in the bar, this is all material that I’m assuming my audience knows about, and is going through. Or if they’re not going through it at the time, they’ll eventually get there."

Two of the songs from the album, "Older Than My Old Man Now" and "The Days That We Die", feature spoken word performances of prose written by Loudon Wainwright Jr. for Life magazine in the early 80s. Regarding his father's influence on Older Than My Old Man Now and the inclusion of his writing, Wainwright noted, "He died in 1988, and I have powerful memories of him. He was a huge presence in my life, and we had difficulties... very typical father-son oedipal clashes, but he was a remarkable guy, and a fine writer. And that’s why I was so excited to be able to include some of his writing on the record, to bring him into the record. Both of my parents are dead, and in a way they've become bigger than ever, more important than ever. I don’t know why that is; maybe because I’m headed down that road myself. There are lots of wonderful old folk songs about how you’re going to join your parents on the other side. That remains to be seen, of course. But yeah, I was very happy to have Loudon Wainwright Junior on my album." Following the album's release, Wainwright subsequently added spoken word performances of his father's writing into his live shows.

The track "Over the Hill" – which previously appeared as a bonus track on the CD reissue of Wainwright's 1975 album, Unrequited – was initially a duet between Wainwright and his then-wife Kate McGarrigle, and appears here as a duet between Wainwright and his daughter Martha Wainwright. Wainwright stated, "Kate, who was the mother of my two older kids, was a very important person in my life. We didn’t hang out much in the last thirty years, but that doesn't diminish the effect that she had on me. And certainly when she died two years ago it had a powerful effect on me. She was a big person in my life."

== Reception ==
Professional ratings
Review scores
| Source | Rating |
|---|---|
| AllMusic | 3/5 stars |
| The A.V. Club | A− |
| The Guardian | 4/5 stars |
| The Independent | 5/5 stars |
| MSN Music (Expert Witness) | A |
| The New York Times | positive |
| Rolling Stone | 3.5/5 stars |
| Spin | 8/10 |

Prior to the album's release, The New Yorker's Hendric Hertzberg stated, "Older Than My Old Man Now is uniformly excellent. It offers not only welcome consolation to those who (like me) are shocked to find ourselves in the relevant age cohort but also, I imagine, innocent amusement to those who — eventually, inevitably — will find themselves there one day, however improbable the prospect may seem at the moment."

== Track listing ==
1. "The Here & the Now"
2. "In C"
3. "Older Than My Old Man Now"
4. "Double Lifetime"
5. "Date Line"
6. "All in a Family"
7. "My Meds"
8. "Interlude"
9. "Over the Hill"
10. "Ghost Blues"
11. "I Remember Sex"
12. "Somebody Else"
13. "The Days That We Die"
14. "10"
15. "Something's Out to Get Me"

== Personnel ==
Musicians The following musicians are confirmed to appear on the album:

- Loudon Wainwright III – vocals, guitar, piano on "In C"
- Ramblin’ Jack Elliott - vocals and guitar on "Double Lifetime"
- Dame Edna Everage - vocals on "I Remember Sex"
- Chris Smither - guitar and harmoy vocals on "Somebody Else"
- Lucy Wainwright Roche - vocals on "All In A Family", backing vocals on "The Here & The Now"
- Suzzy Roche - vocals on "10", backing vocals on "The Here & The Now"
- Chaim Tannenbaum - vocals on "Over The Hill", backing vocals on "The Here & The Now"
- Martha Wainwright - on "Over The Hill", backing vocals on "The Here & The Now"
- Rufus Wainwright - vocals on "The Days That We Die", backing vocals on "The Here & The Now"
- Rob Moose - violin on "Interlude", "Somebody Else" and "Something's Out To Get Me"
- John Scofield - electric guitar on "The Here & The Now"

Recording personnel

- Dick Connette – producer
- Alex Venguer – recording engineer

Cover photo

- Ross Halfin

== Charts ==
Chart performance for Older Than My Old Man Now
| Chart (2012) | Peak position |
|---|---|
| UK Independent Albums (Official Charts) | 25 |
| US Heatseekers Albums (Billboard) | 7 |
| Scottish Albums (Official Charts) | 96 |
| Dutch Albums (Album Top 100) | 96 |
| Belgian Albums (Ultratop Wallonia) | 75 |
| US Americana/Folk Albums (Billboard) | 13 |
