= T Shirt (album) =

Studio album by Loudon Wainwright III
- Released: May 1976
- Studio: Record Plant, New York City
- Genre: Folk
- Label: Arista
- Producer: Loudon Wainwright III

Loudon Wainwright III chronology
Unrequited (1975)	T Shirt (1976)	Final Exam (1978)

Professional ratings
Review scores
Source	Rating
AllMusic	3/5 stars
Christgau's Record Guide	B+

T Shirt is a 1976 album by Loudon Wainwright III. Unlike his earlier records, this (and the subsequent Final Exam) saw Wainwright adopt a rock band (Slowtrain) - though there are acoustic songs on T Shirt, including a talking blues. According to Wainwright on the 2006 CD liner notes, it received a scathing review from Rolling Stone which depressed him so much he stayed in bed for five days. By the early 1990s, he disowned the album in a radio interview broadcast in Australia. However, by the time of the CD remaster (which included Final Exam) he admitted to a much more sympathetic view of the album(s), which he referred to as his 'puppies'.

== Track listing ==
All tracks composed by Loudon Wainwright III; except where indicated

1. "Bicentennial"
2. "Summer's Almost Over"
3. "Hollywood Hopeful" (Traditional; arranged and adapted by Loudon Wainwright III)
4. "Reciprocity"
5. "At Both Ends"
6. "Wine with Dinner"
7. "Hey Packy" (George Gerdes)
8. "California Prison Blues"
9. "Talking Big Apple '75"
10. "Prince Hal's Dirge"
11. "Just Like President Thieu"
12. "Wine with Dinner (Night Cap)"

== Personnel ==
Musicians

- Loudon Wainwright III – guitar, banjo, bells, vocals
- Richard Davis, John Crowder – bass guitar
- Hank Jones – keyboards
- David Sanborn – saxophone
- Marvin Stamm – cornet, trumpet
- Jimmy Maelen – congas
- Elliott Randall, Charles Brown III – electric guitar
- David Taylor – bass trombone
- Eric Weissberg – banjo
- Jeanie Arnold – vocals
- Jon Cobert – piano
- Joe Cocuzzo – drums
- Kenny Kosek – violin
- Richard Crooks – drums, spoons
- Ron Getman – steel guitar
- Don Hammond – alto recorder
- Jimmy Iovine – backing vocals
- Peter La Barbera – vibraphone
- John Lissauer – clarinet, arrangements
- George Marge – recorder
- Irwin "Marky" Markowitz – cornet, trumpet
- Charlie Messing – guitar, vocals
- Gwynne Michaels – backing vocals
- Glen Mitchell – clavinet, electric piano, organ
- Paul Prestopino, Maggie & Terre Roche – vocals
- Christie Thompson – backing vocals
- Stephen Tubin – organ, piano, synthesizer
- Joanne Vent – backing vocals

Technical

- Jimmy Iovine – engineer, mixing
- Benno Friedman – cover photography

== Charts ==
Chart (1976)	Peak position
US Billboard 200	188
US Cash Box Top 100 Albums	189

== Release history ==
- LP: Arista AL4063 (U.S.)
- LP: Arista RTY127 (UK)
- CD: Arcadia ACAD 8142 (2 CD with Final Exam (U.S. 2007)
