= Grown Man =

Studio album by Loudon Wainwright III
- Released: October 2, 1995
- Genre: Folk
- Label: Virgin
- Producer: Loudon Wainwright III, Jeffrey Lesser

Loudon Wainwright III chronology
Career Moves (1993)	Grown Man (1995)	Little Ship (1997)

Professional ratings
Review scores
Source	Rating
AllMusic	3/5 stars
Robert Christgau	A−
Rolling Stone	2/5 stars

Grown Man is an album by the American singer-songwriter Loudon Wainwright III, released on October 2, 1995, on Virgin Records. The release is generally considered less stark and somewhat more humorous that its predecessor, History.

Grown Man contains a song addressed to his daughter, Martha Wainwright, titled "Father/Daughter Dialogue", on which they duet.

== Track listing ==
All tracks composed by Loudon Wainwright III; except where indicated

1. "The Birthday Present"
2. "Grown Man"
3. "That Hospital"
4. "Housework"
5. "Cobwebs"
6. "A Year"
7. "Father/Daughter Dialogue"
8. "1994"
9. "I.W.I.W.A.L.(I Wish I Was a Lesbian)"
10. "Just A John"
11. "I Suppose"
12. "Dreaming"
13. "The End Has Begun"
14. "Human Cannonball"
15. "Treasure Untold" (Jimmie Rodgers, Ellsworth T. Cozzens)

== Personnel ==
- Loudon Wainwright III - guitar, vocals
- Dom Cortese - accordion
- Richard Crooks - drums
- Steve Gaboury - organ, accordion
- John Kaye - percussion
- Randy Landau - bass
- Jeffrey Lesser - percussion, Jew's harp, vocals
- David Mansfield - bouzouki, fiddle, guitar, mandolin, pedal steel, electric & slide guitar
- Chaim Tannenbaum - banjo, harmonica, vocals
- Martha Wainwright - vocals on "Father/Daughter Dialogue"
- Mike Kappus - executive producer

== Release history ==
- CD: Virgin CDV2789
