= Fame and Wealth =

Studio album by Loudon Wainwright III
- Released: 1983
- Studios: Blue Rock, New York City
- Genre: Folk
- Length: 33:02
- Label: Rounder
- Producer: Loudon Wainwright III

Loudon Wainwright III chronology
| A Live One (1979) | Fame and Wealth (1983) | I'm Alright (1985) |

Fame and Wealth is an album by the American musician Loudon Wainwright III, released in 1983.

== Critical reception ==
Professional ratings
Review scores
| Source | Rating |
|---|---|
| AllMusic | 3/5 stars |
| Robert Christgau | B |
| Rolling Stone | 4/5 stars |

The Philadelphia Inquirer wrote that Wainwright "attacks the guitar instead of plucking its strings, and while he's capable of crooning warmly, his standard tone of voice is a strangled yowl."

== Track listing ==
All tracks composed by Loudon Wainwright III

1. "Reader and Advisor" – 5:28
2. "The Grammy Song" – 2:41
3. "Dump the Dog" – 2:08
4. "Thick & Thin" – 2:47
5. "Revenge" – 2:39
6. "Five Years Old" – 3:19
7. "Ingenue" – 3:40
8. "IDTTYWLM" – 4:06
9. "Westchester County" – 2:56
10. "Saturday Morning Fever" – 2:17
11. "April Fool's Day Morn" – 4:30
12. "Fame and Wealth" – 1:31

== Personnel ==
- Loudon Wainwright III – acoustic guitar, banjo, drum, vocals

with:

- Richard Thompson – acoustic guitar on "April Fool's Day Morn"; electric guitar, mandolin on "Reader and Advisor"
- Myles Chase – synthesizer, piano, Fender Rhodes on "Five Years Old"
- Mark Hardwick – piano on "IDTTYWLM"
- Luther Rix – drums, percussion on "Five Years Old"
- Bob Rose – 12-string guitar on "Five Years Old"
- Mark Johnson – percussion on "IDTTYWLM"
- John Miller – bass on "Five Years Old"

Technical

- Michael Ewasko – engineer
- Teddy Wainwright – executive producer
- Keith Scott Morton – cover photography

== Release history ==
- LP: Rounder 3076 (U.S.)
- LP: Demon FIEND5 (UK)
- CD: Rounder CD3076 (1987)
