= Surviving Twin =

- Starring: Loudon Wainwright III

Production
- Production company: Netflix

Original release
- Network: Netflix
- Release: November 13, 2018

Surviving Twin is a Netflix special featuring Loudon Wainwright III, released on November 13, 2018.
