= Loudon Wainwright III (album) =

Studio album by Loudon Wainwright III
- Released: 1970
- Studio: Mediasound, New York City; A & R, New York City; Atlantic, New York City
- Genre: Folk
- Length: 39:01
- Label: Atlantic
- Producer: Loudon Wainwright III, Milton Kramer

Loudon Wainwright III chronology
Loudon Wainwright III (1970)	Album II (1971)

Professional ratings
Review scores
Source	Rating
AllMusic	4/5 stars
Christgau's Record Guide	B−
Rolling Stone	(favorable)

Loudon Wainwright III (also known as Album I) is the debut album of Loudon Wainwright III. It was released on vinyl in 1970 on Atlantic Records. Like his second effort Album II, the album is a solo acoustic effort. Though his ironic sense of humour is evident, this is an altogether bleaker and more acerbic album ("Black Uncle Remus", "Four Is a Magic Number" and "Glad to See You've Got Religion") than most of his 1970s work.

Reflecting another career-long obsession, the first line of the first song on his debut album concerns growing older, a theme which persists to his newest recordings.

== Track listing ==
All tracks composed by Loudon Wainwright III

1. "School Days" – 3:06
2. "Hospital Lady" – 4:05
3. "Ode to a Pittsburgh" – 3:15
4. "Glad to See You’ve Got Religion" – 3:56
5. "Uptown" – 2:45
6. "Black Uncle Remus" – 2:39
7. "Four Is a Magic Number" – 3:28
8. "I Don’t Care" – 4:09
9. "Central Square Song" – 5:28
10. "Movies Are a Mother to Me" – 2:39
11. "Bruno’s Place" – 3:31

== Personnel ==
Technical

- Elliot Scheiner (tracks 1, 2, 7, 8), Jimmy Douglass (tracks 3–5, 9–11), Tony Bongiovi (track 6) - engineer
- Lee Friedlander - cover photography

"Black Uncle Remus" recorded at Media Sound, NYC; "School Days", "Hospital Lady", "Four Is a Magic Number" and "I Don't Care" recorded at A&R Studios, NYC; all other tracks recorded at Atlantic Recording Studios, NYC.

== Release history ==
- LP: Atlantic SD 8260 (U.S.)
- LP: Atlantic 2400103 (UK)
- LP: Atlantic K40101 (2nd press)
- LP: Edsel ED308 (1989 re-release)
- CD: Collector's Choice 632 (April 4, 2006 re-release)

== Miscellanea ==
- The song "Black Uncle Remus" is a reference to the fictional character Uncle Remus featured in several stories by Joel Chandler Harris.
