= Album II (Loudon Wainwright III album) =

Studio album by Loudon Wainwright III
- Released: February 1971
- Studio: Intermedia Sounds, Boston, Massachusetts
- Genre: Folk
- Length: 35:42
- Label: Atlantic
- Producer: Loudon Wainwright III, Milton Kramer

Loudon Wainwright III chronology
Loudon Wainwright III (1970)	Album II (1971)	Album III (1972)

Professional ratings
Review scores
Source	Rating
AllMusic	4/5 stars
Christgau's Record Guide	B+
Rolling Stone	(favorable)

Album II is the second album by Loudon Wainwright III. It was released in 1971 by Atlantic Records.

== Track listing ==
All tracks are written by Loudon Wainwright III, except where noted.

Side one
No.	Title	Length
1.	"Me and My Friend the Cat"	3:23
2.	"Motel Blues"	2:50
3.	"Nice Jewish Girls"	2:09
4.	"Be Careful, There’s a Baby in the House"	3:18
5.	"I Know I’m Unhappy/Suicide Song/Glenville Reel"	3:10
6.	"Saw Your Name in the Paper"	2:14

Side two
No.	Title	Writer(s)	Length
1.	"Samson and the Warden"		3:09
2.	"Plane; Too"		3:10
3.	"Cook That Dinner, Dora"		2:06
4.	"Old Friend"		2:57
5.	"Old Paint"	Traditional; arranged by Loudon Wainwright III	3:50
6.	"Winter Song"		3:30

== Personnel ==
- Loudon Wainwright III - guitar, vocals
- Kate McGarrigle - vocals on "Old Paint"
- Saul Broudy - harmonica on "Old Paint"

Technical

- Milton Kramer - producer on tracks 1, 9 and 5c. All other tracks produced by Loudon Wainwright III
- Michael Leary - engineer
- Peter Hujar - cover photography
- Milton Kramer, Andrew Wainwright - photography

== Release history ==
- LP: Atlantic SD 8291 (U.S.)
- LP: Atlantic K40272 (UK)
- LP: Atlantic 2400 142 (UK)
- LP: Edsel ED310 (1989 re-release)
- CD: Collector's Choice 633 (April 25, 2006 re-release)
