= High Wide & Handsome: The Charlie Poole Project =

Studio album by Loudon Wainwright III
- Released: August 17, 2009
- Recorded: May 2008 – June 2009; 2nd Story Sound, New York City
- Genre: Country
- Label: 2nd Story Sound
- Producer: Dick Connette

Loudon Wainwright III chronology
Recovery (2008)	High Wide & Handsome: The Charlie Poole Project (2009)	10 Songs for the New Depression (2010)

Professional ratings
Review scores
Source	Rating
AllMusic	4/5 stars
Rolling Stone	3.5/5 stars

High Wide & Handsome: The Charlie Poole Project is the 20th studio album by American singer-songwriter Loudon Wainwright III. The album, a double-CD released on the 2nd Story Sound label on August 18, 2009, pays tribute to singer and banjo picker Charlie Poole (1892–1931). It features 30 tracks, including new versions of songs made popular by Poole from 1925 through 1930, as well as original songs on Poole's turbulent life by Wainwright and producer Dick Connette.

More than 25 artists contributed to the album, including Wainwright's children, Rufus Wainwright, Martha Wainwright and Lucy Wainwright Roche, all singer-songwriters in their own right; his sister, singer-songwriter Sloan Wainwright; Maggie, Suzzy and Terre Roche of The Roches; Gabriel Kahane on piano; Chris Thile, mandolinist and vocalist; and Geoff Muldaur, a founding member of the 1960s group Jim Kweskin Jug Band.

The album won the 2010 Grammy Award for Best Traditional Folk Album.

== Background ==
In the 70-page booklet that accompanies the album, Wainwright recalls having first heard of Poole in the early 1970s through folksinger Patrick Sky. He was at Sky's home in Rhode Island, and Sky played the Poole novelty song "Awful Hungry Hash House". Wainwright found it hilarious, and over the next few years learned other songs by the North Carolina picker. He also became intrigued by stories of Poole's life – his days as a mill worker, his stint as a semi-pro baseball player, his success as one of country music's first stars, and the alcoholism that led to his early death.

Wainwright admits to identifying with Poole, whom he describes as a "rambling, hard-drinking, crazy Southern showman." He initially thought of writing a biographical film on Poole's life and fantasized about playing the lead part, but it never came to anything. Instead, some three decades later, he and Connette collaborated in recording what Wainwright refers to as "a sonic bio-pic of sorts."

Connette conceived the idea for the album after giving Wainwright a copy of the three-CD collection Charlie Poole and the Roots of Country Music (Columbia, 2005). He also bought a copy for himself, and, in listening to it, he says he thought about "how it was that Loudon particularly related to Poole – the humor, the clarity, the simplicity, the wise guy attitude, and, occasionally, an unapologetic emotional sincerity." In December 2007, he proposed recording songs that Poole had recorded, along with writing new songs on the artist's life and times. After the success of a demo Wainwright recorded "The Deal", a traditional song performed by Poole that was a huge hit in 1925 (it sold 100,000 copies at a time when there were only 600,000 phonograph players in existence), Connette says, "I knew we were onto something." Shortly afterwards, Wainwright wrote what was to become the album's title track, "High Wide & Handsome". With that, the project started to come together.

Besides wanting to pay tribute to Poole, Wainwright and Connette had another purpose in creating High Wide & Handsome. Despite his significant contributions to the development of country music – Poole had already had several hits before country greats Jimmie Rodgers and the Carter Family recorded their first songs in 1927 – he has yet to be named to the Country Music Hall of Fame. Wainwright and Connette hope their album will help win Poole induction into the Hall and earn him the recognition they believe he deserves. Taking this a step further, in early August 2009, just before High Wide & Handsome's release, Wainwright and two of the musicians featured on the album, David Mansfield and Chaim Tannenbaum, performed a set of material from the album in a concert at the Hall of Fame's Ford Theater.

== Track list ==
Disc One
No.	Title	Writer(s)	Length
1.	"High Wide & Handsome"	Loudon Wainwright III	2:53
2.	"Took My Gal out Walkin'" (featuring Martha Wainwright)		2:34
3.	"I'm the Man Who Rode the Mule Around the World"	Traditional	3:35
4.	"My Mother and My Sweetheart"	E.P. Moran/J. Fred Helf	3:13
5.	"Bill Mason's Bride" (featuring Chris Thile)	Bret Harte	3:00
6.	"Goodbye Booze"	Jean Havez	2:56
7.	"Old Ballyhoo"	Dick Connette	2:03
8.	"Little Waterloo"	Dick Connette	3:00
9.	"I'm Glad I'm Married" (featuring Dick Connette)	Jack Norworth/Albert Von Tilzer	3:31
10.	"Mother's Last Farewell Kiss"		4:48
11.	"Acres of Diamonds"	Dick Connette	2:54
12.	"Way Up in NYC"	Loudon Wainwright III/Dick Connette	4:10
13.	"If I Lose"	Traditional	4:02
14.	"The Great Reaping Day" (Chaim Tannenbaum)	R. E. Winsett	2:50
15.	"Where the Whippoorwill Is Whispering Goodnight"	Rufe K. Stanley	3:25

Disc Two
No.	Title	Writer(s)	Length
1.	"The Man in the Moon" (Maggie Roche)	Loudon Wainwright III/Dick Connette	2:33
2.	"The Deal" (featuring Chris Thile)	Traditional	4:11
3.	"No Knees"	Loudon Wainwright III	2:23
4.	"Moving Day"	Andrew B. Sterling/Harry Von Tilzer	2:38
5.	"Old and Only in the Way" (featuring Rufus Wainwright & Martha Wainwright)	P.J. Downey/L.T. Billings	3:51
6.	"Ragtime Annie" (Rob Moose, Dana Lyn & Chris Thile)	Traditional	3:39
7.	"Sweet Sunny South"		2:43
8.	"The Letter That Never Came"	Paul Dresser/Max Sturm	3:09
9.	"Awful Hungry Hash House"	Traditional	4:32
10.	"Rowena"	Loudon Wainwright III/Dick Connette	2:34
11.	"Didn't He Ramble"	Will Handy	3:59
12.	"Ramblin' Blues" (featuring Sloan Wainwright)	W. C. Handy	4:00
13.	"Charlie's Last Song"	Loudon Wainwright III/Dick Connette	5:07
14.	"Beautiful" (featuring Lucy Wainwright Roche)	Barney E. Warren	4:01
15.	"High Wide & Handsome (Reprise)"	Loudon Wainwright III	2:08

== Personnel ==
- Loudon Wainwright III – banjo, guitar, vocals, backing vocals, liner notes, photo courtesy
- Paul Asaro – piano
- C.J. Camerieri – trumpet, French horn, brass arrangement
- Dick Connette – arranger, cymbals, drums (bass), backing vocals, producer, liner notes, vocal arrangement, song notes
- Paula Court – photography
- Michael Davis – trombone
- Peter Ecklund – trumpet, whistle (human)
- Danielle Farina – viola
- Erik Friedlander – cello
- Rayna Gellert – violin
- Scott Hull – mastering
- Milt Kramer – photography
- Scott Lehrer – engineer, mixing
- Stewart Lerman – engineer
- Dan "D Unit" Levine – trombone, euphonium
- Tim Luntzel – bass
- Dana Lyn – violin
- David Mansfield – bass, dobro, mandolin, violin, backing vocals, string arrangements
- Greil Marcus – liner notes
- Rob Moose – acoustic guitar, mandolin, violin, arranger, national steel guitar, tenor guitar
- Geoff Muldaur – banjo, arranger
- Matt Munisteri – banjo, guitar, arranger
- Ben Perowsky – drums
- Dave Roche – backing vocals
- Maggie Roche – vocals, backing vocals
- Suzzy Roche – backing vocals
- Terre Roche – backing vocals, vocal arrangement
- Marcus Rojas – tuba
- Kinney Rorrer – liner notes, photo courtesy
- Stefan Schatz – drums
- Johnny Lee Schell – engineer
- Wade Schuman – harmonica
- Chaim Tannenbaum – banjo, guitar, harmonica, mandolin, vocals, backing vocals
- Chris Thile – mandolin, backing vocals
- Alex Venguer – engineer, mixing
- Martha Wainwright – backing vocals
- Rufus Wainwright – backing vocals
- Sloan Wainwright – backing vocals
- Paul Woodiel – violin

== Charts ==
Chart performance for High Wide & Handsome
Chart (2008)	Peak position
UK Independent Albums (Official Charts)	27
US Top Bluegrass Albums (Billboard)	2
US Heatseekers Albums (Billboard)	46
