= Therapy (Loudon Wainwright III album) =

Studio album by Loudon Wainwright III
- Released: 1989
- Recorded: September–October 1988
- Studio: Elephant Studios, Wapping, London
- Genre: Folk
- Length: 46:11
- Label: Silvertone
- Producer: Chaim Tannenbaum; Loudon Wainwright III

Loudon Wainwright III chronology
More Love Songs (1986)	Therapy (1989)	History (1992)

Professional ratings
Review scores
Source	Rating
AllMusic	4/5 stars
Robert Christgau	B+

Therapy is a 1989 album by Loudon Wainwright III. It followed a three-year hiatus, during which Wainwright moved from England (where he had recorded his previous two albums) back to the US. Compared with those two, Therapy was not well received, but outstanding tracks have subsequently appeared on live albums (e.g. "Thanksgiving" on Career Moves).

== Track listing ==
All tracks composed by Loudon Wainwright III

No.	Title	Length
1.	"Therapy"	4:24
2.	"Bill of Goods"	3:20
3.	"T.S.D.H.A.V."	2:09
4.	"Harry's Wall"	5:22
5.	"Aphrodisiac"	3:47
6.	"Fly Paper"	3:42
7.	"Nice Guys"	3:03
8.	"Thanksgiving"	5:39
9.	"Your Father's Car"	2:23
10.	"Me & All the Other Mothers"	3:04
11.	"You Don't Want to Know"	3:46
12.	"Mind Read (It Belonged to You)"	2:47
13.	"This Year"	3:04

The only single from Therapy, "T.S.D.H.A.V.", did have one, featuring Wainwright singing the song in an easy chair; he gets up from the chair for a moment to answer the telephone (a PLEASE STAND BY graphic appears on the screen). It still airs occasionally on VH-1 Classic.

A live version of "T.S.D.H.A.V." can be found on the b-side of Wainwright's one-off single "If Jesse Don't Like It", which was also recorded before an audience.

== Personnel ==
- Loudon Wainwright III – guitar, vocals
- Richard Thompson – guitar, mandolin
- Arran Ahmun – drums, percussion
- B.J. Cole – pedal steel
- Alan Dunn – piano, accordion
- Bob Loveday – fiddle
- Ian Maidman – bass
- Ruari McFarlane – bass
- Chaim Tannenbaum – banjo, harmonica, tenor saxophone
- Linda Taylor – vocals
- Olly Blanchflower – double bass
- Simon Limbrick – marimba
- Cathi Ogden – vocals

== Release history ==
- LP: Silvertone 1203-1-J
- LP: Silvertone ORE LP 500
- CD: Silvertone ORE CD 500
