= Dead Skunk =

Single by Loudon Wainwright III

from the album Album III
- B-side: "Needless to Say"
- Released: November 1972
- Recorded: 1972
- Genre: Bluegrass; novelty
- Length: 3:04
- Label: Columbia
- Songwriter: Loudon Wainwright III
- Producer: Thomas Jefferson Kaye

Official Audio
- "Dead Skunk" on YouTube

"Dead Skunk" is a 1972 novelty song by Loudon Wainwright III. Released as a single in November 1972, it eventually peaked at number 16 on the Billboard Hot 100 chart on March 31, 1973 and appears on Wainwright's 1972 album Album III.

== Background ==
The song is musically a simple folk song based on banjo, accompanied by guitar, drums and fiddle. The lyrics describe a dead skunk in the middle of a road and the smell it produces for people as they drive by. Wainwright has said that the song came out of an actual accident involving a skunk, and that he wrote it in 15 minutes. ("Someone had already killed it, but I ran over it)".

Although the single was released in November 1972, it was not until well into 1973 that it caught on with radio stations, and its number 16 peak on the Billboard Hot 100 chart was not reached until the week ending 31 March 1973. It peaked at number 12 on the Cashbox charts on April 14. It was the only record to chart for Wainwright. "Dead Skunk" also reached number 8 in Canada and number 12 in Australia.

In 1974, a Dutch version was issued called "Een witte eend op het midden van de weg" ("A white duck in the middle of the road"). The song was performed by Ciska Peters & Ronnie Tober.

== Chart performance ==
=== Weekly charts ===
Chart (1973)	Peak position
Australia KMR	12
Canada RPM	8
U.S. Billboard Hot 100	16
U.S. Cash Box Top 100	12

=== Year-end charts ===
Chart (1973)	Rank
Australia	66
Canada	73
U.S. (Joel Whitburn's Pop Annual)	128
