= Album III =

Studio album by Loudon Wainwright III
- Released: June 15, 1972
- Studios: Marquee Studios, London
- Genre: Folk
- Length: 32:19
- Label: Columbia
- Producer: Thomas Jefferson Kaye

Loudon Wainwright III chronology
Album II (1971)	Album III (1972)	Attempted Mustache (1973)

Professional ratings
Review scores
Source	Rating
AllMusic	3/5 stars
Christgau's Record Guide	A−
Rolling Stone	(favorable)

Album III is the third full-length album from Loudon Wainwright III. It was released in 1972 on Columbia Records. Album III would spawn Loudon Wainwright's most popular hit single, "Dead Skunk", one of the many 'novelty songs' sprinkled throughout Wainwright's career. Although Wainwright has maintained an ironic, sometimes sepulchral sense of humor, "Dead Skunk", despite its commercial success, has dogged him ever since, as he comments on 1985's album I'm Alright, "Were you embarrassed about 'Dead Skunk'"?

This is the first of his albums to feature a full backing band, on many tracks, which was named White Cloud. Wainwright mostly eschewed a rocking sound for a stripped down acoustic one from the early-1980s onwards.

== Track listing ==
All tracks composed by Loudon Wainwright III except where noted.

1. "Dead Skunk" – 3:05
2. "Red Guitar" – 1:49
3. "East Indian Princess" – 2:56
4. "Muse Blues" – 2:53
5. "Hometeam Crowd" – 1:49
6. "B Side" – 2:26
7. "Needless To Say" – 3:14
8. "Smokey Joe's Cafe" (Jerry Leiber, Mike Stoller) – 2:31
9. "New Paint" – 3:00
10. "Trilogy (Circa 1967)" – 3:11
11. "Drinking Song" – 2:55
12. "Say That You Love Me" – 2:30

== Personnel ==
- Loudon Wainwright III – guitar, vocals
- David Amram – French horn
- Charlie Brown III – guitar, electric guitar
- Richard Crooks – drums
- Richard Davis – bass
- Thomas Jefferson Kaye – guitar, arranger, rhythm guitar, producer
- Bill Keith – banjo, steel guitar
- Kenny Kosek – fiddle, violin
- Hugh McCracken – guitar
- Don Payne, Tom Watson – electric bass
- Elliott Randall – electric guitar
- Jimmy Ryan – guitar
- David Sanborn – saxophone
- "Sailor" Bob Schmidt – harmonica
- Eric Weissberg – dobro, guitar
- Teddy Wender – piano

White Cloud consisted of Charles Brown III, Richard Crooks, Thomas Jefferson Kaye, Kenneth Kosek, Don Payne and Teddy Wender

Technical

- Brooks Arthur – engineer, mixing
- Milton Kramer – executive producer
- Fred Lombardi – cover photography

== Charts ==
Chart (1973)	Peak position
Australian Albums (Kent Music Report)	62
Canada Top Albums/CDs (RPM)	82
US Billboard 200	102
US Cash Box Top 100 Albums	75

== Release history ==
- LP: Columbia KC 31462 (US)
- LP: CBS 65238 (UK)
- CD: Sony CK31462 (August 20, 1990, re-release)
