= Little Ship (album) =

Studio album by Loudon Wainwright III
- Released: 1998
- Recorded: Shelter Island Sound, Sear Sound and Big House Recording, New York City
- Genre: Folk
- Length: 48:17
- Label: Virgin/Charisma
- Producer: John Leventhal, Loudon Wainwright III

Loudon Wainwright III chronology
Grown Man (1995)	Little Ship (1998)	BBC Sessions (1998)

Professional ratings
Review scores
Source	Rating
AllMusic	3/5 stars
Robert Christgau	(3-star Honorable Mention)
Uncut	4/5 stars

Little Ship is an album by the American singer-songwriter Loudon Wainwright III, released in 1998 on Virgin Records/Charisma Records. According to Wainwright, the album "focuses primarily on the theme of a relationship. In terms of the other records, I don't know how or why I would place it somewhere except that it's the newest."

== Track listing ==
All tracks composed by Loudon Wainwright III

1. "Breakfast in Bed" – 3:05
2. "Four Mirrors" – 2:55
3. "Mr. Ambivalent" – 3:44
4. "OGM" – 2:55
5. "Our Own War" – 3:50
6. "So Damn Happy" – 2:25
7. "Primrose Hill" – 4:47
8. "Underwear" – 1:30
9. "The World" – 1:49
10. "What Are Families For?" – 4:26
11. "Bein' a Dad" – 3:41
12. "The Birthday Present ll" – 3:51
13. "I Can't Stand Myself" – 2:41
14. "Little Ship" – 3:33
15. "A Song" – 3:05

== Personnel ==
The following people contributed to Little Ship:

Musicians

- Loudon Wainwright III – vocals, guitars, banjo, ukulele, "Bein' a Dad" chorus
- John Leventhal – guitars, keyboards, percussion, harmonica, harmonium, lap steel, mandolin, bass, drums, "Bein' a Dad" chorus
- Tony Garnier – bass ("Breakfast in Bed", "Mr. Ambivalent", "Our Own War", "Primrose Hill", "Bein' a Dad", "I Can't Stand Myself" and "Little Ship")
- Shawn Pelton – drums ("Breakfast in Bed", "Mr. Ambvivalent", "Our Own War", "Bein' a Dad", "I Can't Stand Myself" and "Little Ship")
- Rick Depofi – tenor saxophone, clarinet, bass clarinet ("What Are Families For?" and "I Can't Stand Myself")
- Brian Mitchell – organ ("Mr. Ambivalent" and "I Can't Stand Myself")
- Shawn Colvin – background vocals ("Mr. Ambivalent" and "Our Own War")
- Larry Campbell – pedal steel ("Our Own War")
- Sandra Park – violin leader ("Breakfast in Bed" and "A Song")
- Sharon Yamanda – violin ("Breakfast in Bed" and "A Song")
- Richard Sortomme – violin ("Breakfast in Bed" and "A Song")
- Carol Webb – violin ("Breakfast in Bed" and "A Song")
- Lisa E. Kim – violin ("Breakfast in Bed" and "A Song")
- Daniel F. Reed – violin ("Breakfast in Bed" and "A Song")
- Sue Pray – viola ("Breakfast in Bed" and "A Song")
- Robert Rinehart – viola ("Breakfast in Bed" and "A Song")
- Alan J. Stepansky – cello ("Breakfast in Bed" and "A Song")
- Maria Kitsopoulos – cello ("Breakfast in Bed" and "A Song")
- John Patitucci – bass ("Breakfast in Bed" and "A Song")
- Chris Botti – trumpet ("Our Own War" and "The Birthday Present II")
- Bob Carlisle – trumpet ("Our Own War" and "The Birthday Present II")
- Jimmy Hynes – trumpet, flugelhorn ("Our Own War" and "The Birthday Present II")
- Michael Davis – trombone ("Our Own War" and "The Birthday Present II")
- Steve Addabbo – "Bein' a Dad" chorus

Arrangements

- Stephen Barber – string arrangement ("A Song") and horn arrangement ("Our Own War")
- Rick DePofi – horn arrangements ("What Are Families For?" and "I Can't Stand Myself")
- John Leventhal – horn arrangements ("What Are Families For?", "I Can't Stand Myself" and "The Birthday Present II")

Recording personnel

- John Leventhal – producer, recording, mixing
- Loudon Wainwright III – producer
- Mike Kappus – executive producer
- Joe Blaney – recording
- Scott Ansell – additional recording
- Tom Shick – recording assistant
- John Reigart – recording assistant
- Aaron Keane – recording assistant
- Ken Feldman – recording assistant
- Steve Addabbo – mixing ("Bein' a Dad", "I Can't Stand Myself", "Mr. Ambivilant" and "Our Own War")
- Ted Jensen – mastering

Artwork

- Hugh Brown – art direction, photography
- Ellie Kompare – "Family" illustration
- Katsushika Hokusai – "The Great Wave Off Kanagawa"

== Release history ==
- CD: Virgin CDV2844
