= So Damn Happy (Loudon Wainwright III album) =

Live album by Loudon Wainwright III
- Released: 2003
- Genre: Folk rock
- Label: Sanctuary
- Producers: Stewart Lerman, Loudon Wainwright III

Loudon Wainwright III chronology
Last Man on Earth (2001)	So Damn Happy (2003)	Here Come the Choppers (2005)

Professional ratings
Review scores
Source	Rating
AllMusic	4/5 stars
Robert Christgau	B+
Rolling Stone	3/5 stars

So Damn Happy is the third live album by American singer-songwriter Loudon Wainwright III, released in 2003 on Sanctuary Records. The album was recorded at Largo in West Hollywood, California, and features, amongst others, Van Dyke Parks, Richard Thompson, and Martha Wainwright.

So Damn Happy compiles mostly nineties-era Wainwright songs, particularly from Grown Man, and new songs.

Regarding So Damn Happy's lighter tone, in comparison to previous release, Last Man on Earth, Loudon stated that:

[One of the reasons I made this record is that] Last Man on Earth had a kind of serious tone to it, let's say. But this record, one of the reasons that we wanted to call it So Damn Happy - aside from the fact that there's a tune on the album with that title - was that we wanted to herald that it's lighter in tone. And there are some serious songs in it [but] there's some completely silly stuff, too, which I certainly hopefully never will forgo entirely. [...] It's a good time, and a lighter time, and I'm doing fine.

== Track listing ==
1. "Much Better Bets" – 3:05
2. "So Damn Happy" – 2:54
3. "Between" – 1:23
4. "The Picture" – 2:48
5. "Cobwebs" – 3:09
6. "Heaven" – 2:52
7. "Something for Nothing" – 4:10
8. "Dreaming" – 4:05
9. "Westchester County" – 4:20
10. "Tonya's Twirls" – 4:47
11. "A Year" – 3:37
12. "You Never Phone" (with Martha Wainwright) – 3:06
13. "4 X 10" – 2:26
14. "The Sh*t Song" – 4:18
15. "Primrose Hill" – 4:17
16. "The Home Stretch" – 5:09
17. "Men" – 3:36

== Charts ==
Chart performance for So Damn Happy
Chart (2007)	Peak position
UK Independent Albums (Official Charts)	42

== Release history ==
- CD: Sanctuary 06076-84627-2
