= Social Studies (Loudon Wainwright III album) =

Studio album by Loudon Wainwright III
- Released: 1999
- Genres: Folk, satire
- Length: 52:08
- Label: Hannibal
- Producers: Joe Boyd, John Wood

Loudon Wainwright III chronology
BBC Sessions (1998)	Social Studies (1999)	Last Man on Earth (2001)

Social Studies is a studio album by Loudon Wainwright III, released in 1999. The album comprises various topical and satirical songs, originally produced for National Public Radio and based upon then-current issues and events, such as the Tonya Harding scandal, the O. J. Simpson murder trial, the lead-up to Y2K, and controversies surrounding comments made by former Republican U.S. Senator Jesse Helms.

Regarding the album's topical nature, Wainwright notes: "It's something that no-one does anymore; write songs about current events. When I was young there were a lot of topical songwriters around; maybe folk music had more impact on culture back then. I see these songs as a kind of musical journalism. My father was a journalist, for Life, and I've definitely inherited something of that approach."

== Production ==
The album was written over a period of 15 years, with Wainwright composing on his Martin guitar. It was produced by Joe Boyd and John Wood. NPR declined to air several of the songs that eventually became part of the album's track listing.

== Critical reception ==
Professional ratings
Review scores
Source	Rating
AllMusic	4.5/5 stars
Robert Christgau	(1-star Honorable Mention)
The Encyclopedia of Popular Music	3/5 stars
Rolling Stone	3/5 stars

Rolling Stone wrote that "the best political songs combine passionate commitment and analytic command, laced with streaks of black humor, as in prime Mekons or Gil Scott-Heron." The Guardian deemed Social Studies "largely an album about alienation, anonymous telephone sex, and a society that lives vicariously, either through the OJ soap opera, or by watching TV news."

The Boston Globe thought that the album "shines with the same wise-guy wit, but also with a kind-eyed empathy that gives even his goofiest songs a sage maturity and warm emotional resonance." The Independent opined that Wainwright "is as wry and acid as ever, but most tracks should probably have remained one-off live broadcasts, as intended."

== Track listing ==
All tracks composed by Loudon Wainwright III

1. "What Gives" – 3:29
2. "Tonya's Twirls" – 3:37
3. "New Street People" – 2:50
4. "Carmine Street" – 2:57
5. "O.J." – 3:13
6. "Leap of Faith" – 2:53
7. "Conspiracies" – 2:17
8. "Christmas Morning" – 3:36
9. "Y2K" – 6:13
10. "Number One" – 3:39
11. "Bad Man" – 3:21
12. "Inaugural Blues" – 3:19
13. "Our Boy Bill" – 3:11
14. "Jesse Don't Like It" – 4:06
15. "Pretty Good Day" – 4:19

== Personnel ==
- Loudon Wainwright III – guitar, vocals
- The Roches – vocals
- John Scofield – electric guitar
- Greg Cohen – bass, piano
- Richard Crooks – drums, percussion
- Peter Ecklund – trumpet, cornet
- David Mansfield – guitar, harmonica, violin, mandolin
- Jenni Muldaur – vocals
- Ken Pearson – organ, piano
- Lenny Pickett – clarinet, saxophone
- Chaim Tannenbaum – banjo, harmonica, vocals

== Charts ==
Chart performance for Social Studies
Chart (1999)	Peak position
UK Independent Albums (Official Charts)	38

== Release history ==
- CD: Hannibal HNCD 1442
