= More Love Songs =

Studio album by Loudon Wainwright III
- Released: 1986
- Studios: Elephant, Wapping, London; Temple Records
- Genre: Folk
- Length: 46:19
- Label: Rounder
- Producers: Richard Thompson, Loudon Wainwright III, Chaim Tannenbaum

Loudon Wainwright III chronology
I'm Alright (1985)	More Love Songs (1986)	Therapy (1989)

Professional ratings
Review scores
Source	Rating
AllMusic	4.5/5 stars
Robert Christgau	B+
Rolling Stone	(favorable)

More Love Songs is a 1986 album by Loudon Wainwright III released on Rounder Records. Wainwright had moved to England, and this was the second album produced by (and featuring) Richard Thompson. Critically and popularly it is probably considered the peak of his 1980s renaissance. After three albums in four years, it would be another three years before he released the largely ignored Therapy. The album was nominated for the "Best Contemporary Folk Recording" Grammy.

The style of the album combines purely acoustic staples like "Your Mother and I" with piano-driven ballads like "The Back Nine" and full-blown rockers like "Vampire Blues" and "Hard Day on the Planet". Wainwright also careens emotionally from the sad "Overseas Call" to the laugh-out-loud "Synchronicity".

Wainwright also enjoyed a period of popularity as a regular on Jasper Carrott's shows in the UK, and many of the songs from his following album were written during his time living in the UK as well as some (still) unreleased songs. By the late 1980s, Wainwright returned to the USA.

== Track listing ==
1. "Hard Day on the Planet" – 4:48
2. "Synchronicity" – 3:20
3. "Your Mother and I" – 2:33
4. "I Eat Out" – 1:53
5. "No" – 3:42
6. "The Home Stretch" – 3:48
7. "The Acid Song" – 4:33 (not included on the LP version)
8. "Unhappy Anniversary" – 2:54
9. "Man's World" – 5:28
10. "Vampire Blues" – 2:55
11. "Overseas Call" – 4:04
12. "Expatriate" – 2:17
13. "The Back Nine" – 4:04

== Personnel ==
- Loudon Wainwright III - guitar, percussion, vocals
- Arran Ahmun - percussion
- Martin Brinsford - percussion
- Martin Carthy - guitar, mandolin, vocals
- Richard Cheetham - trombone
- Howard Evans - trumpet
- Peter Filleul - keyboards
- Christopher Guest - synthesizer
- John Kirkpatrick - accordion, vocals
- Dave Mattacks - drums
- Ruari McFarlane - bass
- Brian McNeill - fiddle
- Alan Reid - synthesizer
- Chaim Tannenbaum - banjo, harmonica, saxophone, vocals
- Danny Thompson - bass
- Richard Thompson - guitar, mandolin, vocals
- Beckie Burns, Christine Collister, Maria Muldaur, Linda Taylor - additional vocals

Produced by Richard Thompson, Chaim Tannenbaum, Paul Charles and Loudon Wainwright III.

== Release history ==
- LP: Rounder 3106 (U.S.)
- LP: Demon FIEND79 (UK)
- CD: Rounder 3106
- CD: Demon FIENDCD79 (UK)
