= I'm Alright (Loudon Wainwright III album) =

Studio album by Loudon Wainwright III
- Released: 1985
- Recorded: June 1985
- Studios: Olympic, London
- Genre: Folk
- Label: Rounder
- Producers: Richard Thompson, Loudon Wainwright III

Loudon Wainwright III chronology
Fame and Wealth (1983)	I'm Alright (1985)	More Love Songs (1986)

Professional ratings
Review scores
Source	Rating
AllMusic	3/5 stars
Robert Christgau	B+

I'm Alright is a 1985 album by Loudon Wainwright III. It was his third release on Rounder Records, recorded in London. It was produced by Richard Thompson, who also played electric lead guitar on several songs. The back cover features a photo of the two together, captioned 'Loud and Rich'.

The poignant "Screaming Issue", one of Wainwright's few collaborations – this time with Terre Roche of the Roches – was never compiled, nor has it appeared on a live album. It concerned his then infant daughter Lucy Wainwright Roche, who has since played and recorded with him.

This album continued Wainwright's reinvention of himself as an acoustic-based artist, and was the first of his Thompson production collaborations, which would peak critically the following year with More Love Songs.

Thompson continued to tour with Wainwright, and Danny Thompson of Pentangle into the late 1990s. His most recent appearance on a LW3 album was 2003's So Damn Happy.

The album was nominated for the "Best Contemporary Folk Recording" Grammy.

== Track listing ==
All tracks composed by Loudon Wainwright III; except where indicated

1. "One Man Guy" – 4:16
2. "Lost Love" – 3:22
3. "I'm Alright" – 2:23
4. "Not John" – 4:25
5. "Cardboard Boxes" – 3:15
6. "Screaming Issue" (Wainwright III, Terre Roche) – 4:52
7. "How Old Are You?" – 2:08
8. "Animal Song" – 2:16
9. "Out Of this World" – 3:17
10. "Daddy Take a Nap" – 3:59
11. "Ready or Not (So Ripe)" – 4:17
12. "Career Moves" – 3:16

== Personnel ==
- Loudon Wainwright III – guitar, vocals
- Paul Brady – vocals
- Richard Thompson – guitar, mandolin
- Tony Coe – clarinet
- Henry Lowther – cornet
- Christine Collister – vocals
- Gerry Conway – drums
- Chris Karan – percussion, executive producer
- Greg Prestopino – vocals
- Chris Pyne – trombone
- Chaim Tannenbaum – executive producer
- Danny Thompson – string bass
- Ric Sanders – electric and octave violin

Technical

- Doug Bennett – engineer
- Alex Madjitey – cover photography

== Release history ==
- LP: Rounder 3096 (U.S.)
- LP: Demon FIEND54 (UK)
- CD: Rounder 3096
