= Unrequited (album) =

Studio album by Loudon Wainwright III
- Released: February 1975
- Recorded: June–November 1974
- Venue: The Bottom Line, New York City
- Genre: Folk
- Length: 48:38
- Label: Columbia
- Producer: Loudon Wainwright III, Mark Harmon, Milton Kramer, Bruce Dickinson (1998 CD reissue)

Loudon Wainwright III chronology
Attempted Mustache (1973)	Unrequited (1975)	T Shirt (1976)

Professional ratings
Review scores
Source	Rating
AllMusic	link
Christgau's Record Guide	A−
Rolling Stone	mixed link
The Village Voice	A−

Unrequited is the fifth album from Loudon Wainwright III. It was his last album on the Columbia Records label, released in 1975. Tracks 1–7 were recorded in a studio, while tracks 8–14 were recorded live at The Bottom Line in New York City. Tracks 15–17 are bonus tracks included on the Sony-Legacy CD reissue.

Although stylistically typical of Wainwright's mid-1970s output, the album is somewhat groundbreaking in that though all songs are originals, one side is studio, the other live.

== Reception ==
In Rolling Stone, Paul Nelson said Wainwright's career was on a downward slide, and, "Now there is Unrequited and the turn for the worse continues. The singing has further weakened, the production (by the artist himself) is clumsy and inadequate and the material has started to deteriorate.

== Track listing ==
All songs composed by Loudon Wainwright III; except where indicated

1. "Sweet Nothings" – 2:47
2. "The Lowly Tourist" – 3:28
3. "Kings and Queens" (Loudon Wainwright III, George Gerdes) – 2:21
4. "Kick in the Head" – 2:49
5. "Whatever Happened to Us" – 2:02
6. "Crime of Passion" – 3:01
7. "Absence Makes the Heart Grow Fonder" – 2:28
8. "On the Rocks" – 3:15
9. "Guru" – 2:16
10. "Mr. Guilty" – 3:25
11. "The Untitled" – 2:58
12. "Unrequited to the Nth Degree" – 3:59
13. "Old Friend" – 2:53
14. "Rufus Is a Tit Man" – 2:28
15. "Rufus Is a Tit Man" (Alternate Version) – 2:59
16. "Over the Hill" (Loudon Wainwright III, Kate McGarrigle) – 2:50
17. "Hollywood Hopeful" – 2:39

== Song information ==
Studio

- "Sweet Nothings"

Paramount – August 21, 1974
Loudon Wainwright III, Calvin Hardy, Greg Thomas, Frank Kleiger, Ron Colbertson, Randy Wallace, Jon Hall, Marty Grebb, David Sanborn, Chris Guest
Written by Loudon Wainwright III
Produced and arranged by Mark Harmon

- "The Lowly Tourist"

Bearsville – April 5, 1974
Loudon Wainwright III, Harvey Brooks, Marty Grebb, Richard Crooks, Jon Hall, George Gerdes
Written by Loudon Wainwright III
Produced by Loudon Wainwright III and Milton Kramer

- "Kings and Queens"

Paramount – August 22, 1974
Loudon Wainwright III, Klaus Voormann, Jim Keltner, Lyle Ritz, Jay Migliori, Richard Green, Austin de Lone
Written by Loudon Wainwright III and George Gerdes
Produced by Loudon Wainwright III

- "Kick in the Head"

Record Plant, Sausalito, CA – October 9, 1974
Loudon Wainwright III
Written by Loudon Wainwright III
Produced by Loudon Wainwright III

- "Whatever Happened to Us"

Bearsville – June 28, 1974
Loudon Wainwright III, Jon Hall, Marty Grebb, Harvey Brooks, Richard Crooks, Freebo
Written by Loudon Wainwright III
Produced by Loudon Wainwright III and Milton Kramer

- "Crime of Passion"

Paramount – August 22, 1974
Loudon Wainwright III, Jim Keltner, Klaus Voormann, Randy Wallace, Richard Greene, Martin Fierro
Written by Loudon Wainwright III
Produced by Loudon Wainwright III

- "Absence Makes the Heart Grow Fonder"

Columbia, NYC – November 20, 1974
Loudon Wainwright III, Kate and Anna McGarrigle
Written by Loudon Wainwright III
Produced by Loudon Wainwright III

=== Live at the Bottom Line ===
Live tracks recorded live at the Bottom Line, remote by Record Plant NYC, August 30, August 31, September 1, 1974. All songs written, performed and produced by Loudon Wainwright III.

=== Bonus tracks ===
All songs written by Loudon Wainwright III except for "Over the Hill" written by Loudon Wainwright III and Kate McGarrigle. All songs produced by Loudon Wainwright III

== Charts ==
Chart (1975)	Peak position
US Billboard 200	156

== Release history ==
- LP: Columbia PC 33369 (U.S.)
- LP: CBS 80696 (UK)
- CD: Edsel EDCD273 (1988)
- CD: Sony-Legacy 65258 (1998)
