= Attempted Mustache =

Studio album by Loudon Wainwright III
- Released: 1973
- Studio: Ray Stevens Sound Lab, Nashville, Tennessee
- Genre: Folk
- Length: 38:38
- Label: Columbia
- Producer: Bob Johnston, Bruce Dickinson (1998 reissue production)

Loudon Wainwright III chronology
Album III (1972)	Attempted Mustache (1973)	Unrequited (1975)

Professional ratings
Review scores
Source	Rating
AllMusic	4/5 stars
Christgau's Record Guide	A−
Rolling Stone	favorable

Attempted Mustache is the fourth album from Loudon Wainwright III. It was recorded in Nashville, Tennessee, with producer Bob Johnston and was released in 1973 on Columbia Records.

Wainwright said that "I Am the Way" was partly inspired by Guru Maharaj Ji's appearance at the Millennium '73 festival in December 1973.

Johnny Cash covered the song "The Man Who Couldn't Cry" live on his album American Recordings.

== Track listing ==
All songs written by Loudon Wainwright III; except where indicated

1. "The Swimming Song" – 2:26
2. "A.M. World" – 2:31
3. "Bell Bottom Pants" – 2:27
4. "Liza" – 2:47
5. "I Am the Way (New York Town)" (based on "New York Town", music by Woody Guthrie; new title and lyrics by Loudon Wainwright III) – 3:12
6. "Clockwork Chartreuse" – 3:37
7. "Down Drinking at the Bar" – 3:55
8. "The Man Who Couldn't Cry" – 6:16
9. "Come a Long Way" (Kate McGarrigle) – 2:45
10. "Nocturnal Stumblebutt" – 3:45
11. "Dilated to Meet You" – 2:02
12. "Lullaby" – 2:55

== Personnel ==
- Loudon Wainwright III - acoustic guitar, banjo, vocals
- Kenneth Buttrey - drums
- Johnny Christopher - acoustic guitar, electric guitar
- Tommy Cogbill - bass
- Ron Cornelius - acoustic guitar, electric guitar
- Mac Gayden - acoustic guitar, electric guitar, slide guitar
- Reggie Young - acoustic guitar, electric guitar
- Hargus "Pig" Robbins - piano, organ
- Doug Kershaw - fiddle and Cajun exclamation
- Kate McGarrigle - banjo, vocal

== Release history ==
- LP: Columbia KC 32710 (U.S.)
- LP: CBS 65837 (UK)
- CD: Edsel EDCD269
- CD: Sony-Legacy 65257 (1998)
