= History (Loudon Wainwright III album) =

Studio album by Loudon Wainwright III
- Released: 1992
- Studios: The Hit Factory, New York City
- Genres: Folk, folk rock
- Length: 46:06
- Label: Charisma
- Producers: Loudon Wainwright III, Jeffrey Lesser

Loudon Wainwright III chronology
Therapy (1989)	History (1992)	Career Moves (1993)

History is an album by the American musician Loudon Wainwright III, released in 1992 on Charisma Records. Wainwright supported the album with North American and European tours.

== Production ==
Wainwright chose the tracks from around 25 songs he had written over the course of four years. He originally wanted to use Family Album as the title. His ex-wives, Kate McGarrigle and Suzzy Roche, provided backing vocals on "So Many Songs". Syd Straw sang on "When I'm at Your House". A banjo was used on "The Doctor".

The final track, "A Handful of Dust", is an adaptation of a song written by Wainwright's father. "Hitting You" references an incident with his daughter Martha Wainwright. "A Father and a Son" is directed to his son, Rufus Wainwright. "The Picture" was inspired by a childhood photograph of Wainwright and his sister Teddy. "Talking New Bob Dylan", commissioned by NPR, is both a tribute to Bob Dylan and a reflection on being labeled, in the early 1970s, "a new Dylan".

== Critical reception ==
Professional ratings
Review scores
Source	Rating
AllMusic	4.5/5 stars
Robert Christgau	(1-star Honorable Mention)
The Encyclopedia of Popular Music	3/5 stars
The Republican	4/5 stars
Toronto Sun	4/5 stars

The New York Times noted that "the core of the album examines family history with a directness and a pained honesty, and it takes up a subject—childrearing—that most baby-boom songwriters have unaccountably avoided except when mistily celebrating a birth"; Stephen Holden later listed it as the third best album of 1992. The Morning Call considered History to be the sixth best album of the year; the Houston Chronicle included it on a list of the year's best records. The Sydney Morning Herald deemed the album "about as close to a masterpiece as any musician could reasonably expect to produce."

Rolling Stone wrote: "The soul of Wasp angst, of quiet bleeding on summer lawns, Wainwright's spare folk laments are absolutely exceptional." The Philadelphia Inquirer called History "a masterful scrapbook of songs about raising kids, losing love and growing old that makes plenty of good jokes and makes them hurt." The Toronto Sun opined that "History is so plainspoken, its truths occasionally don't reveal themselves for two or three listens ... Perhaps for that very reason, it stands as one of the year's finest albums."

AllMusic considered the album to be a masterpiece, writing that it "features a mix of the humorous and the serious, the autobiographical and the observational, the rockin' and the balladic, all wrapped up in some classy arrangements."

== Track listing ==
All tracks composed by Loudon Wainwright III

1. "People in Love" – 2:57
2. "Men" – 3:35
3. "The Picture" – 2:32
4. "When I'm at Your House" – 2:31
5. "The Doctor" – 4:00
6. "Hitting You" – 3:03
7. "I'd Rather Be Lonely" – 2:50
8. "Between" – 1:27
9. "Talking New Bob Dylan" – 3:34
10. "So Many Songs" – 3:52
11. "4 X 10" – 3:07
12. "A Father and a Son" – 3:21
13. "Sometimes I Forget" – 5:53
14. "A Handful of Dust" – 3:24

== Personnel ==
- Loudon Wainwright III – guitar, vocals
- The Roches – vocals
- Syd Straw – vocals
- Jeffrey Lesser – vocals
- David Mansfield – pedal steel & electric guitar, violin
- Anna McGarrigle – vocals
- David Nichtern – acoustic guitar
- Paul Ossola – acoustic bass
- Chris Parker – drums, percussion
- Chaim Tannenbaum – banjo, harmonica, vocals
- Steve Tubin – organ, accordion
- Kate McGarrigle – vocals
- Robin Gould – drums

== Release history ==
- CD: Virgin/Charisma V2-86416 (U.S.)
- CD: Virgin CDV2703 (UK and Europe)
