= Loudon Wainwright III =

American musician (born 1946)

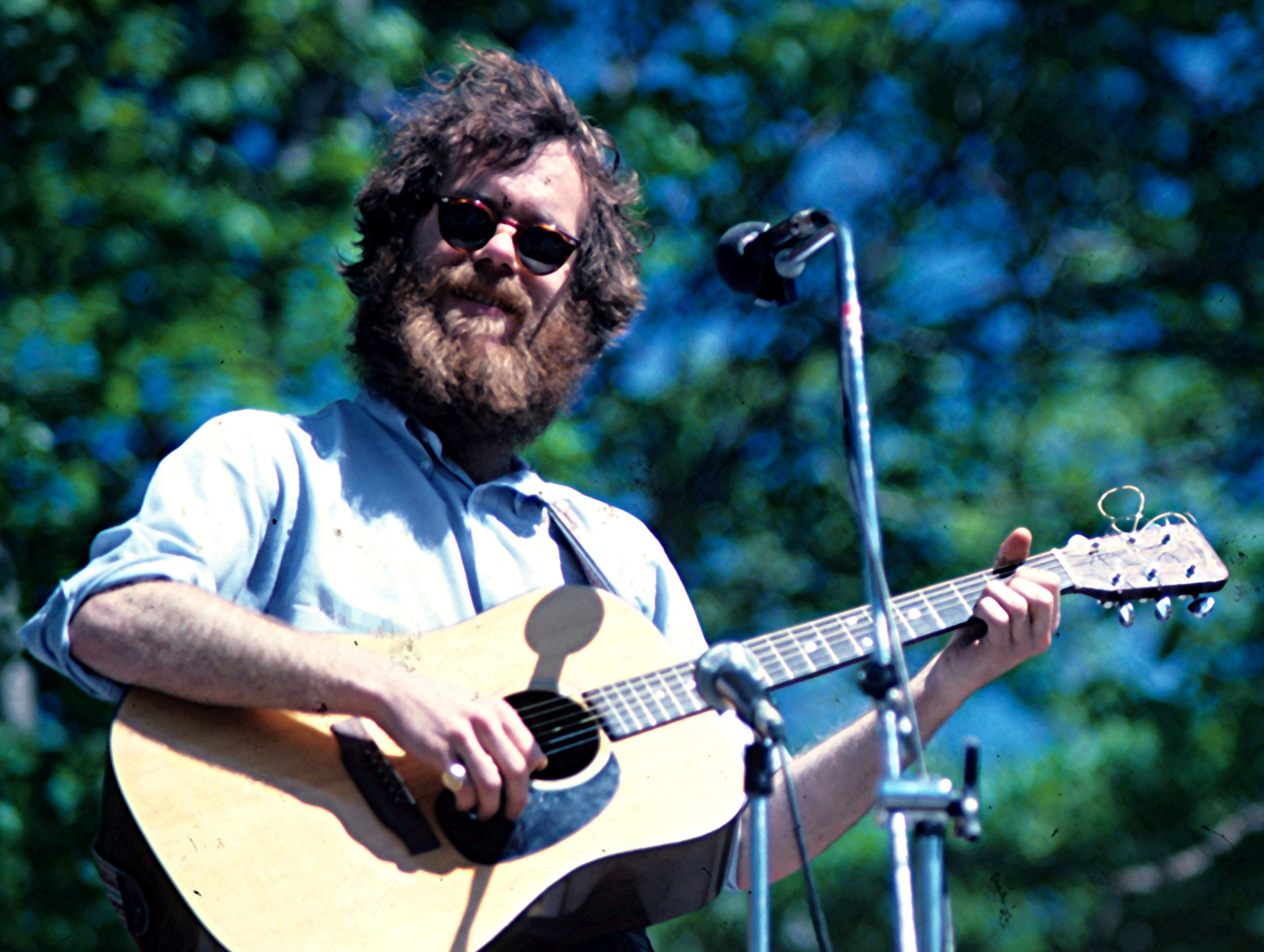

Background information
- Born: Loudon Snowden Wainwright III; September 5, 1946 (age 79); Chapel Hill, North Carolina, U.S.
- Origin: Bedford, New York, U.S.
- Genres: Folk; rock; blues; comedy
- Occupations: Musician; actor
- Instruments: Vocals; guitar; piano; banjo; ukulele; percussion
- Works: Loudon Wainwright III discography
- Years active: 1967–present
- Labels: Atlantic; Columbia; Legacy; Arista; Radar; Rounder; Silvertone; Charisma; Hannibal; Demon; Verve; Rykodisc; Red House; Sanctuary Records; 2nd Story Sound Records; Sovereign Artists; Concord; Proper Records
- Website: lw3.com

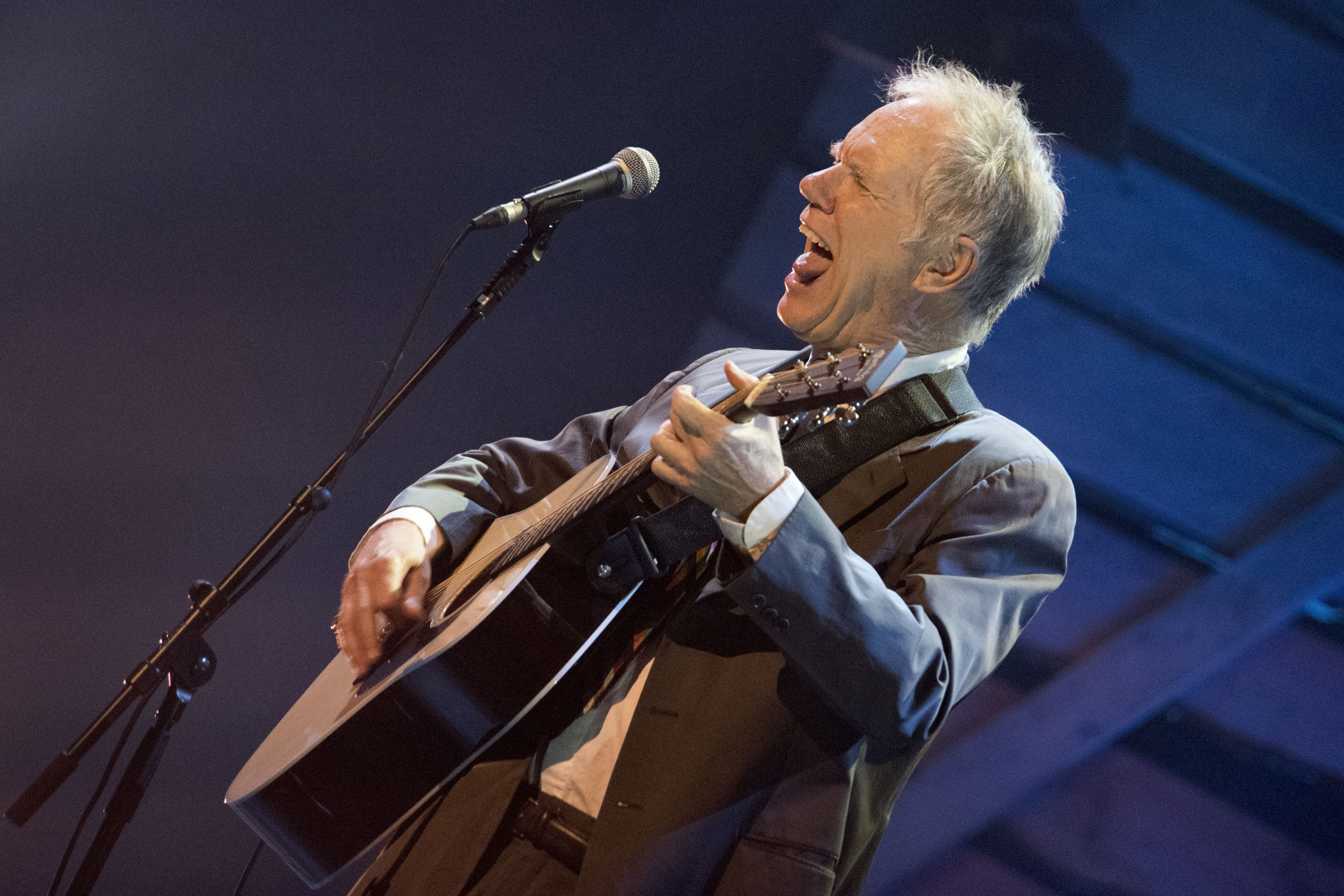
Wainwright at the BBC Radio 2 Folk Awards in 2015, at which he and Yusuf Islam/Cat Stevens both received a lifetime achievement award.

President's Day

Loudon Snowden Wainwright III (born September 5, 1946) is an American singer-songwriter and occasional actor. He has released twenty-six studio albums, four live albums, and six compilations. Some of his best-known songs include "The Swimming Song", "Motel Blues", "The Man Who Couldn't Cry", "Dead Skunk", and "Lullaby". In 2007, he collaborated with musician Joe Henry to create the soundtrack for Judd Apatow's film Knocked Up. In addition to music, he has acted in small roles in at least eighteen television programs and feature films, including three episodes in the third season of the series M*A*S*H.

Reflecting upon his career in 1999, he stated, "You could characterize the catalog as somewhat checkered, although I prefer to think of it as a tapestry." He is the brother of singer Sloan Wainwright and has four children, including musicians Rufus Wainwright, Martha Wainwright, and Lucy Wainwright Roche. He has been married and divorced twice, including to folk singer Kate McGarrigle.

== Early life ==
Wainwright was born in Chapel Hill, North Carolina, the son of Martha Taylor, a yoga teacher, and Loudon Wainwright Jr., a columnist and editor for Life magazine. His great-great-grandfather was the politician and diplomat A. Loudon Snowden. He is a descendant of Peter Stuyvesant, the director-general of New Netherland.

Wainwright's father was not a professional musician, but he played the piano and wrote some songs, exposing his children to musicians such as Tom Lehrer and Stan Freberg, whom Wainwright later cited as influences. Wainwright grew up in Bedford, New York, in Westchester County. Among his sisters is Sloan Wainwright, also a singer. Like his father, he attended St. Andrew's School near Middletown, Delaware.

== Career ==
Wainwright began writing songs in 1968, while living in Cambridge, Massachusetts. His first song, "Edgar", was about a lobster fisherman he had met while working in a boatyard on Rhode Island. He had previously studied acting at Carnegie Mellon University, before leaving to participate in the Summer of Love in San Francisco. After writing his first songs, he performed in small rooms and folk clubs in Cambridge, Boston, and New York City. He was soon noticed and obtained a recording contract. Wainwright signed with Atlantic Records in 1969, and the label released his self-titled debut album in 1970.

Wainwright is perhaps best known for the 1972 novelty song "Dead Skunk (in the Middle of the Road)" and for playing Captain Calvin Spalding (the "singing surgeon") on the American television show M*A*S*H. His appearances spanned three episodes in the show's third season (1974–1975).

Using a witty, self-mocking style, Wainwright has recorded over twenty albums on eleven different labels. Three of his albums have been nominated for Grammy Awards: I'm Alright (1985), More Love Songs (1986), and High Wide & Handsome: The Charlie Poole Project (2009), for which he won the Grammy for Best Traditional Folk Album in January 2010.

Wainwright has also appeared in a number of films, including small parts in The Aviator (with two of his children), Big Fish, Elizabethtown, The 40-Year-Old Virgin, 28 Days, and Knocked Up, and the television series Undeclared and Parks and Recreation. In the UK, he recorded sessions for John Peel from 1971 onwards and appeared on a simultaneous broadcast on BBC TV and on Radio 1 in February 1978 (known as Sight and Sound in Concert). However, it was in the late 1980s that he gained much wider popularity in Britain, when he appeared as the resident singer with comedian Jasper Carrott on his show Carrott Confidential.

He appeared as a musical guest on Saturday Night Live in the first season's fifth episode, which was hosted by Robert Klein and broadcast on November 15, 1975. He performed "Bicentennial" and "Unrequited to the Nth Degree".

Wainwright has said that, like many of his contemporaries, he was inspired musically by seeing Bob Dylan at the Newport Folk Festival in 1963. He was one of many young folk singers tagged as the "new Dylan" in the early 1970s, a fact that he later ruefully satirized in his song "Talking New Bob Dylan" from the album History (1992).

Wainwright was a judge for the fourth annual AIM Independent Music Awards.

Following the death of his mother in 1997, Wainwright went through a period of severe depression and stopped writing music. He returned to the family home in Katonah, New York, where he remained for about 18 months. He later said that therapy and medication helped him recover, after which he began writing songs again. The songs he wrote following his mother's death became the basis for his album Last Man on Earth, which was released by Red House Records in 2001.

Wainwright and musician Joe Henry composed the music for the 2007 Judd Apatow film Knocked Up. In addition to composing the soundtrack, Wainwright appeared in the film in a supporting role as the protagonists' obstetrician. He has also composed music for the new theatre production of Carl Hiaasen's Lucky You, which premiered at the 2008 Edinburgh Festival Fringe.

In 2017, Wainwright released his autobiography, Liner Notes: On Parents & Children, Exes & Excess, Death & Decay, and a Few of My Other Favorite Things.

== Personal life ==
=== Relationships and family ===
Wainwright's first marriage, to singer-songwriter Kate McGarrigle, ended in divorce. During their marriage, they had two children: Rufus and Martha, both of whom are musicians.

Wainwright later had a relationship with singer Suzzy Roche, during which they had a daughter, Lucy Wainwright Roche, who is also a musician. The relationship ended, although Wainwright and Suzzy Roche remain on good terms and occasionally appear onstage together, sometimes with Lucy.

Wainwright's second marriage was to Ritamarie Kelly, and the couple lived in Los Angeles. This marriage also ended in divorce. They have a daughter, Alexandra (Lexie) Kelly Wainwright (born 1993).

Since 2015, Wainwright has lived with Susan Morrison, an editor at The New Yorker.

=== Mutual inspiration for songs ===
Wainwright's first wife, Kate McGarrigle, wrote her song "Go Leave" about him. In it, she recounts how in the 1970s, he, her then-husband, ran off to Europe with performance artist Penny Arcade. McGarrigle, who was pregnant at the time with what would have been their third child, traveled from Canada to England in search of him. After finding him, she lost the baby, and Wainwright informed her that he was leaving her. Their daughter, Martha, has said that it is "the most gut-wrenchingly painful song ever. At the end, you hear the sound of a tear falling on to a string of her guitar. I used to listen to it as a child and cry my eyes out".

Wainwright's son, Rufus, was the inspiration behind two of his songs: "Rufus Is a Tit Man" (referring to his breastfeeding) and "A Father and a Son", a retrospective. Rufus has written the song "Dinner at Eight" about his conflicted relationship with his father.

Martha and her father sang a duet on "Father Daughter Dialogue" (on Loudon's 1995 album, Grown Man) and collaborated on the song "You Never Phone" (on Loudon's 2003 live album, So Damn Happy). Wainwright's songs inspired by his first daughter, Martha, are "That Hospital" (about visiting a hospital during her gestation for an attempted abortion) "Pretty Little Martha" (about her as an infant), "Five Years Old" (about missing her fifth birthday), the confessional "Hitting You" (about assaulting her), the duet "Father/Daughter Dialogue", and "I'd Rather Be Lonely". In 2005, Martha told The Guardian, "For most of my childhood Loudon talked to me in song, which is a bit of a shitty thing to do, especially as he always makes himself come across as funny and charming while the rest of us seem like whining victims, and we can't tell our side of the story. As a result he has a daughter who smokes and drinks too much and writes songs with titles like 'Bloody Mother Fucking Asshole'." Regarding "Hitting You", Wainwright has said, "I would never forget that event, that incident... hauling off and whacking my kid...it's not something I would ever forget. There was an interesting song there".

Martha had originally presumed that "I'd Rather Be Lonely" was about an old girlfriend and was shocked when Wainwright told an audience that it was about her. She revealed that she "always felt terribly sorry for the poor woman I thought it was about because of the line: 'Every time I see you cry you're just a clone of every woman I've known'. Then one time I was on tour with Loudon and he said to the crowd: 'I wrote this song about my daughter'. I had no idea. We lived together for one year in New York when I was 14 and it was a disaster, and 'I'd Rather Be Lonely' was about that year. He really crossed the line there". In her memoir, Stories I Might Regret Telling You, Martha wrote that, when she heard the song's key lines, "You're still living here with me / I'd rather be lonely" and realized that the song was about her, "A part of me wanted to jump to my death from my tiny seat. Or, better yet, take off into the night, leaving him standing there waiting for me. But the show must go on, so I dried my tears and went down the stairs and on to the stage".

== Discography ==
Studio albums

- Loudon Wainwright III (1970)
- Album II (1971)
- Album III (1972)
- Attempted Mustache (1973)
- Unrequited (1975)
- T Shirt (1976)
- Final Exam (1978)
- Fame and Wealth (1983)
- I'm Alright (1985)
- More Love Songs (1986)
- Therapy (1989)
- History (1992)
- Grown Man (1995)
- Little Ship (1997)
- Social Studies (1999)
- Last Man on Earth (2001)
- Here Come the Choppers (2005)
- Strange Weirdos (2007)
- Recovery (2008)
- High Wide & Handsome: The Charlie Poole Project (2009)
- 10 Songs for the New Depression (2010)
- Older Than My Old Man Now (2012)
- Haven't Got the Blues (Yet) (2014)
- Surviving Twin (2017)
- I'd Rather Lead a Band (2020)
- Lifetime Achievement (2022)

== Filmography ==
- M*A*S*H (1974–1975) (TV) – Capt. Calvin Spalding, the singing surgeon. (3 episodes: "Rainbow Bridge", "There Is Nothing Like a Nurse", "Big Mac")
- Saturday Night Live (1975) (TV) – Season 1, episode 5 (Hosted by Robert Klein, with musical numbers by ABBA and Wainwright)
- America 2-Night (1978) (TV) – himself ("Hostage Crisis", season 1, episode 55)
- The Slugger's Wife (1985) – Gary
- Jacknife (1989) – Ferretti
- 28 Days (2000) – Guitar guy
- Undeclared (2001) (TV) – Hal Karp
- Ally McBeal (2002) (TV) – Jerome Trouper (Love Is All Around, parts 1 & 2)
- Big Fish (2003) – Beamen
- The Aviator (2004) – Coconut grove vocalist No. 2
- The 40-Year-Old Virgin (2005) – Priest
- Elizabethtown (2005) – Uncle Dale
- For Your Consideration (2006) – Nominee Ben Connelly
- Knocked Up (2007) – Dr. Everett Howard (also composed music)
- G-Force (2009) – Grandpa Goodman
- Parks and Recreation (2009) (TV) – Barry, a nutso community-forum attendee (Episode 1)
- Person of Interest (2012) (TV) – Mr. Frey
- Sleepwalk with Me (2012) – Uncle Max
- Mosaic (2018) – Casey Delacroix/Dennis Klein, a confidence trickster/a fake persona he created
