= J. J. Cale discography =

- Soundtrack albums: 2
- Compilation albums: 13
- Video albums: 4
- Solo studio albums: 15
- Solo live albums: 3
- Collaborative albums: 5
- Box sets: 3
- Repackaged sets: 4

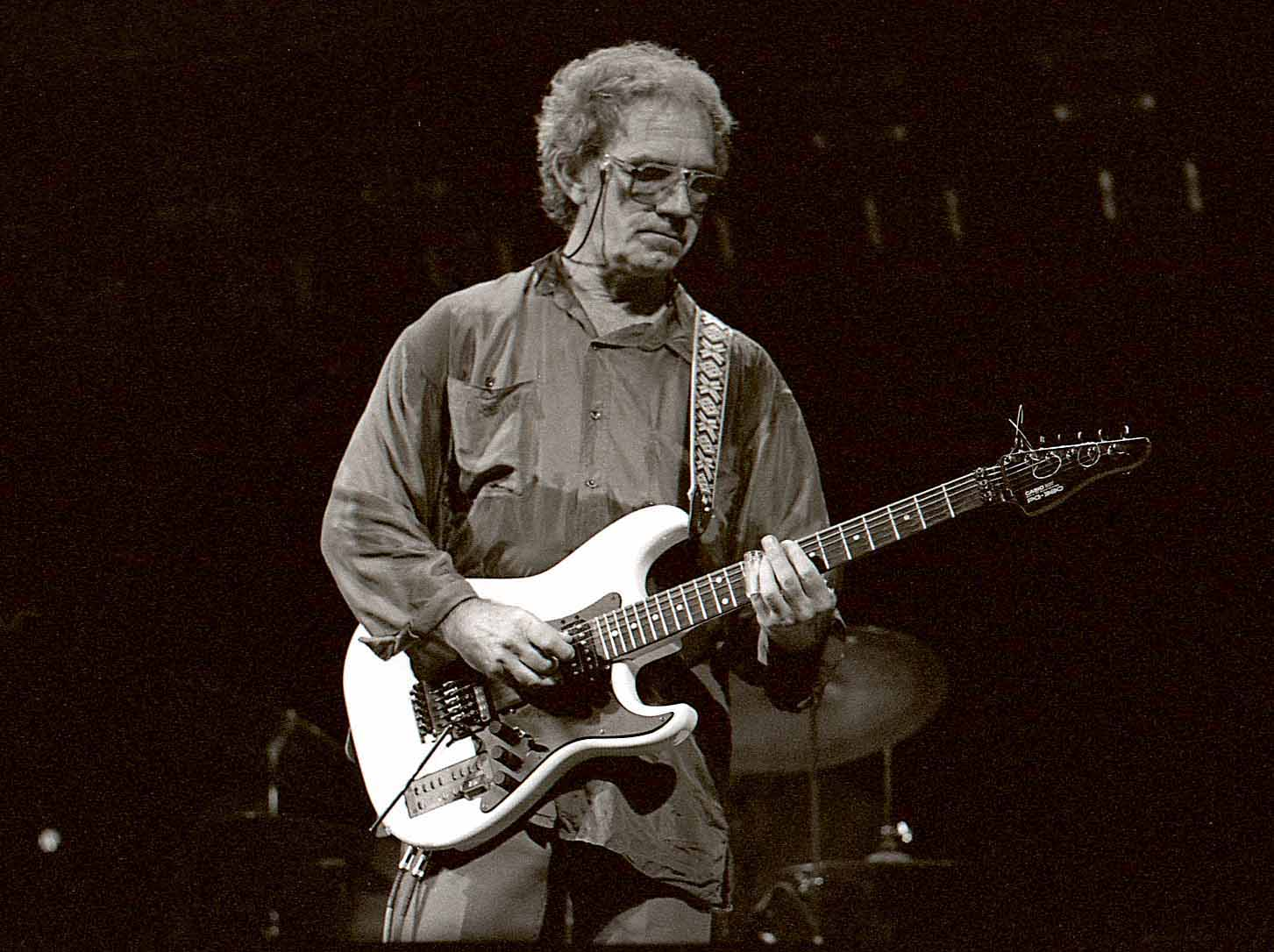
J.J. Cale, playing his Casio PG-380 MIDI Guitar

This article is the discography of American guitarist and singer-songwriter J. J. Cale.

== Albums ==
=== Studio albums ===
| Title | Details | Peak chart positions | | | | | | | | | | |
| Title | Details | US | AUS | FIN | FRA | GER | NL | NOR | NZ | SWE | SWI | UK |
|---|---|---|---|---|---|---|---|---|---|---|---|---|
| Naturally | Released: October 25, 1971; Label: Shelter; Formats: LP, MC | 51 | 10 | — | — | — | — | — | — | — | — | — |
| Really | Released: December 4, 1972; Label: Shelter; Formats: LP, MC, 8-track | 92 | 48 | — | — | — | — | 11 | — | — | — | — |
| Okie | Released: May 20, 1974; Label: Shelter; Formats: LP, MC, 8-track | 128 | 45 | — | — | — | — | — | — | — | — | — |
| Troubadour | Released: September 1976; Label: Shelter; Formats: LP, MC, 8-track | 84 | 36 | 12 | — | 22 | 4 | 9 | 2 | 43 | — | 53 |
| 5 | Released: August 1979; Label: Shelter/MCA; Formats: LP, MC, 8-track | 136 | 6 | 8 | 7 | 27 | 12 | 8 | 8 | 24 | — | 40 |
| Shades | Released: February 1981; Label: Shelter/MCA; Formats: LP, MC | 110 | 14 | 9 | 2 | 37 | 21 | 8 | 10 | 8 | — | 44 |
| Grasshopper | Released: March 1982; Label: Mercury; Formats: LP, MC | 149 | 17 | 9 | 7 | 37 | 3 | 5 | 19 | 15 | — | 36 |
| #8 | Released: September 1983; Label: Mercury; Formats: CD, LP, MC | — | 52 | 12 | 9 | — | 13 | — | — | 36 | — | 47 |
| Travel-Log | Released: 1989; Label: Silvertone; Formats: CD, LP, MC | 131 | 102 | 18 | — | — | 76 | — | — | 50 | 29 | — |
| Number 10 | Released: November 10, 1992; Label: Silvertone; Formats: CD, LP, MC | — | — | 35 | — | — | 52 | — | — | — | — | 58 |
| Closer to You | Released: August 23, 1994; Label: Delabel/Virgin; Formats: CD, MC | — | — | 36 | 32 | — | — | — | — | — | 50 | 82 |
| Guitar Man | Released: June 25, 1996; Label: Delabel/Virgin; Formats: CD, MC | — | — | — | 47 | — | — | — | — | — | — | 125 |
| To Tulsa and Back | Released: June 8, 2004; Label: Sanctuary, Blue Note; Formats: CD, digital download | — | — | — | 41 | 82 | 53 | — | — | — | 99 | 104 |
| Roll On | Released: February 24, 2009; Label: Rounder, Because Music; Formats: CD, LP, digital download | 113 | — | — | 23 | 32 | 11 | — | 29 | 21 | 53 | 90 |
| Stay Around | Released: April 26, 2019; Label: Because Music; Formats: CD, LP, digital download | — (Note: Stay Around did not chart on the Billboard 200, but did peak at #16 on the Independent Albums chart and #75 on the Album Sales chart.) | — | — | 26 | 9 | 27 | — | — | — | 3 | — (Note: Stay Around did not chart on the Official Albums Chart, but did peak at #12 on the Independent Albums Chart and #27 on the Scottish Albums Chart.) |
"—" denotes releases that did not chart or were not released in that territory.

=== Live albums ===
| Title | Details | Peak chart positions | |
| Title | Details | FRA | IT |
|---|---|---|---|
| Live (recorded 1993–1996) | Released: May 17, 2001; Label: Delabel/Back Porch; Formats: CD | 68 | 49 |
| Breezin' at the Cafe (recorded 1988) | Released: June 2014; Label: Let Them Eat Vinyl; Formats: 2xLP; UK-only release | — | — |
| Ebbets Field 1975 | Released: June 12, 2015; Label: Let Them Eat Vinyl; Formats: 2xLP; UK-only release | — | — |
"—" denotes releases that did not chart or were not released in that territory.

=== Collaborative albums ===
| Title | Details | Peak chart positions | | | | | | | | | |
| Title | Details | US | AUS | FIN | FRA | GER | NL | NOR | NZ | SWI | UK |
|---|---|---|---|---|---|---|---|---|---|---|---|
| The Super Duper Record of Super Heroes | Released: 1966; Label: Design; Formats: LP; As part of the Super Dupers (members of the Allman Joys, Leon Russell and Cale) | — | — | — | — | — | — | — | — | — | — |
| A Trip Down the Sunset Strip | Released: 1967; Label: Viva; Formats: LP; As part of the Leathercoated Minds | — | — | — | — | — | — | — | — | — | — |
| In Session at the Paradise Studios, Los Angeles, 1979 | Released: 2003; Label: Classic Pictures Entertainment; Formats: CD; UK-only release; Featuring Leon Russell | — | — | — | — | — | — | — | — | — | — |
| The Road to Escondido | Released: June 7, 2006; Label: Reprise, Duck; Formats: CD, 2xLP, digital download; Studio album with Eric Clapton | 23 | 43 | 14 | 10 | 2 | 5 | 3 | 1 | 7 | 50 |
| Live in San Diego | Released: September 30, 2016; Label: Reprise; Formats: 2xCD, digital download; Live album by Eric Clapton with special guest JJ Cale | 47 | 61 | — | 87 | 20 | 36 | — | — | 9 | 60 |
"—" denotes releases that did not chart or were not released in that territory.

=== Soundtrack albums ===
| Title | Details |
|---|---|
| Band on the Run | Released: 1982; Label: Infinity; Formats: LP; Australia promo-only release; Soundtrack to the film of the same name; Cale contributed 5 tracks previously released on his studio albums. The remaining tracks are by the Tim Gaze Band |
| La Femme de mon pote | Released: August 31, 1983; Label: Mercury; Formats: LP, MC; France-only release; Soundtrack to the film of the same name, released in English as My Best Friend's Girl; Tracks previously released on Cale's studio albums |

=== Compilation albums ===
| Title | Details | Peak chart positions | | | | |
| Title | Details | AUS | FIN | FRA | NL | NZ |
|---|---|---|---|---|---|---|
| Special Edition | Released: 1984; Label: Mercury; Formats: CD, LP, MC | 52 | — | — | — | — |
| Best of... J.J. Cale | Released: January 1991; Label: Mercury; Formats: CD, LP, MC; Scandinavia and Finland-only release | — | 4 | — | — | — |
| The Very Best of J.J. Cale | Released: May 13, 1997; Label: Mercury; Formats: CD; Re-released in 2006 as The Definitive Collection | — | — | 199 | — | 27 |
| Anyway the Wind Blows: The Anthology | Released: May 21, 1997; Label: Mercury; Formats: 2xCD | — | — | — | — | — |
| Classic J.J. Cale | Released: June 23, 2000; Label: Mercury; Formats: CD | — | — | — | — | — |
| The Best of J.J. Cale (20th Century Masters/The Millennium Collection) | Released: July 23, 2002; Label: Mercury; Formats: CD | — | — | — | — | — |
| Collected | Released: July 14, 2006; Label: Universal Music; Formats: 3xCD; Netherlands-only release | — | — | — | 1 | — |
| Gold | Released: April 16, 2007; Label: Universal Music; Formats: 2xCD | — | — | — | — | — |
| Rewind: The Unreleased Recordings | Released: October 2, 2007; Label: Time Life; Formats: CD, digital download | — | — | 172 | — | — |
| Colour Collection | Released: March 30, 2007; Label: Universal Music; Formats: CD | — | — | — | — | — |
| The Silvertone Years | Released: February 7, 2011; Label: Camden; Formats: CD | — | — | — | — | — |
| The J.J. Cale Collection | Released: April 8, 2011; Label: Universal Music; Formats: 3xCD | — | — | — | — | — |
| After Midnight: The Best Of | Released: May 12, 2014; Label: Spectrum Music; Formats: CD; UK-only release | — | — | — | — | — |
"—" denotes releases that did not chart or were not released in that territory.

=== Video albums ===
| Title | Details |
|---|---|
| Cale and Company 1981 | Released: 1982; Label: Loco Bros. Productions; 30-minute documentary following Cale's Western United States and Canada tour |
| In Session at the Paradise Studios, Los Angeles, 1979 | Released: August 27, 2002; Label: Warner Music Vision/Classic Pictures Entertainment; Formats: DVD; Featuring Leon Russell |
| Crossroads Guitar Festival 2004 | Released: November 9, 2004; Label: Warner Music Vision, Reprise; Formats: 2xDVD; Eric Clapton festival which includes Cale playing two songs with Clapton: "After Midnight" and "Call Me the Breeze" |
| To Tulsa and Back – On Tour with J.J. Cale | Released: 2005; Label: Black Hill Pictures; Formats: DVD |

== Box sets ==
| Title | Details | Peak chart positions |
| Title | Details | NL |
|---|---|---|
| 5 Essential Albums | Released: 2011; Label: Universal; Formats: 5xCD; Box set of Cale's first 5 studio albums; Netherlands-only release | — |
| Classic Album Selection | Released: March 22, 2013; Label: Mercury; Formats: 5xCD; Box set of #8, Shades, Naturally, Troubadour and Grasshopper | 85 |
| 3 Original Albums | Released: June 3, 2016; Label: Universal Music; Formats: 3xCD; Box set of Troubadour, 5 and Shades | — |
"—" denotes releases that did not chart or were not released in that territory.

=== Repackaged sets ===
| Title | Details |
|---|---|
| Naturally + Really | Released: January 15, 1988; Label: Mercury; Formats: CD; Japan-only release |
| Grasshopper / Naturally / Troubadour | Released: 1995; Label: Mercury; Formats: 3xCD |
| Naturally + Really | Released: June 5, 2009; Label: Mercury; Formats: 2xCD |
| Troubadour + Okie | Released: May 7, 2010; Label: Mercury; Formats: 2xCD |

== Singles ==
| Single | Year | Peak chart positions | | | | | | | | Certifications | Album |
| Single | Year | US | AUS | AUT | CAN | GER | NZ | SWE | SWI | Certifications | Album |
|---|---|---|---|---|---|---|---|---|---|---|---|
| "Shock Hop"/"Sneaky" (as Johnny Cale) | 1958 | — | — | — | — | — | — | — | — | | Non-album singles |
| "Let’s Paint the Town Red"/"I Hate Myself" (as Al Sweatt with Johnnie Cale & the Valentines) | 1958 | — | — | — | — | — | — | — | — | | Non-album singles |
| "There’s a Big Wheel"/"Old Black Joe" (as part of Jerry Adams and the Starlighters) | 1959 | — | — | — | — | — | — | — | — | | Non-album singles |
| "Creepin'"/"Hot Licks" (as part of the Starlighters) | 1959 | — | — | — | — | — | — | — | — | | Non-album singles |
| "The Purple Onion"/"Troubles, Troubles, Troubles" (as Johnny Cale Quintette) | 1960 | — | — | — | — | — | — | — | — | | Non-album singles |
| "Ain't That Lovin' You Baby"/"She's My Desire" (as Johnny Cale Quintette) | 1961 | — | — | — | — | — | — | — | — | | Non-album singles |
| "Dick Tracy"/"It's a Go-Go Place" | 1965 | — | — | — | — | — | — | — | — | | Non-album singles |
| "I'm Puttin' You On"/"Who Do You Love" (as part of Sunday Servants) | 1966 | — | — | — | — | — | — | — | — | | Non-album singles |
| "Outside Looking In"/"In Our Time" | 1966 | — | — | — | — | — | — | — | — | | Non-album singles |
| "Slow Motion"/"After Midnight" | 1966 | — | — | — | — | — | — | — | — | | Non-album singles |
| "The Green Hornet" (as part of the Super Dupers) | 1966 | — | — | — | — | — | — | — | — | | The Super Duper Record of Super Heroes |
| "March of Tarzan" (as part of the Super Dupers) | 1966 | — | — | — | — | — | — | — | — | | The Super Duper Record of Super Heroes |
| "Magnolia" | 1971 | — | — | — | — | — | — | — | — | | Naturally |
| "Crazy Mama" | 1971 | 22 | 10 | — | 21 | — | 18 | — | — | | Naturally |
| "After Midnight" | 1972 | 42 | 60 | — | — | — | — | — | — | RMNZ: Gold | Naturally |
| "Lies" | 1972 | 42 | 10 | — | — | — | — | — | — | | Really |
| "Going Down" | 1973 | — | — | — | — | — | — | — | — | | Really |
| "Cajun Moon" | 1974 | — (Note: "Cajun Moon" did not chart on the Billboard Hot 100, but did reach #118 on the Record World chart.) | — | — | — | — | — | — | — | | Okie |
| "I'll Be There (If You Ever Want Me)"/"Precious Memories" | 1974 | — | — | — | — | — | — | — | — | | Okie |
| "Rock and Roll Records" (Germany-only release) | 1974 | — | — | — | — | — | — | — | — | | Okie |
| "I Got the Same Old Blues" | 1975 | — | — | — | — | — | — | — | — | | Okie |
| "Hey Baby" | 1976 | 96 | 75 | — | — | — | — | — | — | | Troubadour |
| "Cocaine" | 1977 | — | 45 | 5 | — | 22 | 1 | 10 | 2 | RMNZ: Gold | Troubadour |
| "Travelling Light" (UK and Netherlands-only release) | 1977 | — | — | — | — | — | — | — | — | | Troubadour |
| "You Got Something" (New Zealand-only release) | 1977 | — | — | — | — | — | — | — | — | | Troubadour |
| "I'm a Gypsy Man" (UK-only release) | 1978 | — | — | — | — | — | — | — | — | | Troubadour |
| "Katy Kool Lady" (UK and Australasia-only release) | 1979 | — | 98 | — | — | — | — | — | — | | 5 |
| "Juarez Blues" (as Juan & Maria; Continental Europe-only release) | 1979 | — | — | — | — | — | — | — | — | | Non-album single |
| "Friday" (Continental Europe-only release) | 1979 | — | — | — | — | — | — | — | — | | 5 |
| "Don't Cry Sister" (Netherlands-only release) | 1979 | — | — | — | — | — | — | — | — | | 5 |
| "Mama Don't" | 1981 | — | 70 | — | — | — | — | — | — | | Shades |
| "Carry On" | 1981 | — | — | — | — | — | — | — | — | | Shades |
| "Wish I Had Not Said That" (Germany-only release) | 1981 | — | — | — | — | — | — | — | — | | Shades |
| "City Girls" | 1982 | — | — | — | — | — | 49 | — | — | | Grasshopper |
| "Devil in Disguise" | 1982 | — | — | — | — | — | — | — | — | | Grasshopper |
| "Don't Wait" (Japan-only release) | 1982 | — | — | — | — | — | — | — | — | | Grasshopper |
| "You Keep Me Hangin' On" (Netherlands-only release) | 1982 | — | — | — | — | — | — | — | — | | Grasshopper |
| "One Step Ahead of the Blues" (New Zealand-only release) | 1982 | — | — | — | — | — | — | — | — | | Grasshopper |
| "Losers" | 1983 | — | — | — | — | — | — | — | — | | #8 |
| "Trouble in the City" (Netherlands-only release) | 1983 | — | — | — | — | — | — | — | — | | #8 |
| "Teardrops in My Tequila" (UK-only release) | 1983 | — | — | — | — | — | — | — | — | | #8 |
| "People Lie" (Spain-only release) | 1983 | — | — | — | — | — | — | — | — | | #8 |
| "Shangaid" | 1989 | — | 149 | — | — | — | — | — | — | | Travel-Log |
| "No Time" | 1989 | — | — | — | — | — | — | — | — | | Travel-Log |
| "Hold On Baby" (EP) | 1990 | — | — | — | — | — | — | — | — | | Travel-Log |
| "That Kind of Thing" (France-only release) | 1990 | — | — | — | — | — | — | — | — | | Travel-Log |
| "Lonesome Train" (UK and Europe-only release) | 1992 | — | — | — | — | — | — | — | — | | Number 10 |
| "Artificial Paradise" (France-only release) | 1992 | — | — | — | — | — | — | — | — | | Number 10 |
| "Long Way Home" | 1994 | — | — | — | — | — | — | — | — | | Closer to You |
| "Closer to You" (France promo-only release) | 1994 | — | — | — | — | — | — | — | — | | Closer to You |
| "Sho-Biz Blues" (France-only release) | 1994 | — | — | — | — | — | — | — | — | | Closer to You |
| "Tijuana" (Live; Netherlands and France promo-only release) | 1996 | — | — | — | — | — | — | — | — | | Non-album single (Note: Original version on Travel-Log.) |
| "Days Go By" (France promo-only release) | 1996 | — | — | — | — | — | — | — | — | | Guitar Man |
| "Hard Love" (Live; Europe promo-only release) | 1996 | — | — | — | — | — | — | — | — | | Non-album single (Note: Original version on Closer to You.) |
| "Guitar Man" (Netherlands promo-only release) | 1996 | — | — | — | — | — | — | — | — | | Guitar Man |
| "The Problem" (Europe promo-only release) | 2004 | — | — | — | — | — | — | — | — | | To Tulsa and Back |
| "Ride the River" (with Eric Clapton; promo-only release) | 2005 | — | — | — | — | — | — | — | — | | The Road to Escondido |
| "Danger" (with Eric Clapton; promo-only release) | 2006 | — | — | — | — | — | — | — | — | | The Road to Escondido |
| "Waymore's Blues" (Europe promo-only release) | 2007 | — | — | — | — | — | — | — | — | | Rewind: The Unreleased Recordings |
| "Roll On" (featuring Eric Clapton; promo-only release) | 2009 | — | — | — | — | — | — | — | — | | Roll On |
| "Who Knew" (UK promo-only release) | 2009 | — | — | — | — | — | — | — | — | | Roll On |
| "Stay Around" (Europe promo-only release) | 2019 | — | — | — | — | — | — | — | — | | Stay Around |
"—" denotes releases that did not chart or were not released in that territory.

== Contributions ==
| Year | Title | Artist | Contribution (Note: This is a list of vocal and instrumental credits and does not include production, technical or writing credits.) |
|---|---|---|---|
| 1973 | Back in '72 | Bob Seger | Lead guitar on "Midnight Rider" |
| 1973 | Hank Wilson's Back Vol. I | Leon Russell | Electric guitar on all tracks |
| 1973 | Angel Clare | Art Garfunkel | Guitar |
| 1974 | Stop All That Jazz | Leon Russell | Electric guitar on "If I Were a Carpenter" |
| 1975 | Will O' the Wisp | Leon Russell | Electric guitar on "Can't Get Over Losing You" |
| 1976 | Sweet Harmony | Maria Muldaur | Electric and slide guitar on "Sad Eyes" |
| 1978 | Back in the U.S.A. | Jonas Fjeld Band | Guitar on "S.R.O." |
| 1978 | Gordon Payne | Gordon Payne | Guitar on "Go Ask Her" |
| 1978 | Après minuit | Eddy Mitchell | Guitar on "Après minuit" |
| 1978 | Comes a Time | Neil Young | Electric guitar |
| 1978 | That's the Way a Cowboy Rocks and Rolls | Jessi Colter | Guitar |
| 1979 | Naked Child | Lee Clayton | Guitar and vocals |
| 1984 | Veranda | Christine Lakeland | Electric guitar on "Mr. Completely" |
| 1984 | To a Wild Rose | Ben Keith | Guitar |
| 1990 | The Rhythm of the Saints | Paul Simon | Guitar on "Can't Run But" and "Born at the Right Time" |
| 1991 | Lover Café | Émile Wandelmer | Guitar |
| 1992 | Got Love If You Want It | John Hammond | Guitar on "I‘ve Got Love If You Want It" |
| 1993 | Reckoning | Christine Lakeland | Electric guitar on "Who Knows", "Hard Day" and "On a Good Day" |
| 1994 | The Tractors | The Tractors | Guitar on "The Tulsa Shuffle" |
| 1994 | Seven Gates: A Christmas Album | Ben Keith & Friends | Guitar |
| 2006 | Uncovered | Tony Joe White | Guitar and vocals on "Louvelda" |
| 2010 | Clapton | Eric Clapton | Guitar and vocals on "River Runs Deep" and "That's No Way to Get Along"; vocals on "Everything Will Be Alright" |
| 2013 | Old Sock | Eric Clapton | Guitar and vocals on "Angel" |
