= Rocky Frisco =

- Born: Don Roscoe Joseph III; July 26, 1937; St. Louis, Missouri, U.S.
- Origin: Tulsa, Oklahoma, U.S.
- Died: May 26, 2015 (aged 77)
- Genres: Folk, rock, blues
- Instrument: Piano
- Years active: 1957–2015
- Formerly of: J. J. Cale Band
- Website: www.rockyfrisco.com

Don Roscoe Joseph III (July 26, 1937 – May 26, 2015), professionally known as Rocky Frisco and Rocky Curtiss, was an American musician. He was best known as the longtime pianist for J. J. Cale, and for his role in the development of the music style known as the Tulsa Sound.

== Music career ==
Frisco was born in St. Louis, Missouri. He moved to Tulsa and attended Central High School in the 1950s, where he met J. J. Cale and graduated in 1955. Frisco and Cale played together in Gene Crose's band starting in 1957. In the fall of 1958, Frisco moved to Pennsylvania to form a band for Clyde Stacy. When Stacy retired in 1959, Frisco became lead singer for the band, the Four Flames, recording a Columbia Harmony album in New York entitled The Big Ten, as "Rocky Curtiss and the Harmony Flames." Frisco performed voice work for radio and television commercials, most recently for Chris Nikel and Nelson Mazda in the Tulsa area.

During the mid-1960s, Frisco, disgusted with the music business after having thousands of dollars in royalties embezzled by an A & R man he trusted, quit playing, moved to Ontario, Canada, and worked for IBM and raced MGs and Mini Coopers at Harewood Acres and Mosport. He drove a Morris Mini in the preliminary races for the 1967 Canadian Grand Prix, reverting to the name Don Joseph. In 1972, he returned to Tulsa and started playing again, first with the Don White Band and then with the John D. LeVan Band. In the years since, he played with Bill David, Gus Hardin, Tommy Overstreet and others.

Frisco rejoined Cale's band in 1994, and toured the United States and Europe that summer and fall, with TV broadcasts from France, Germany, the Netherlands, and the United Kingdom. Cale's 1996 tour included a concert on March 29 at Carnegie Hall with The Band. Frisco can be heard on the Cale CDs J. J. Cale Live, To Tulsa And Back, and Roll On. He wrote and sang "The Pursuit of Happiness" as well as on Eric Clapton's Crossroads Guitar Festival DVD set and the J. J. Cale Band's DVD tour video for To Tulsa and Back.

In May 2008, Frisco was inducted into the Oklahoma Blues Hall of Fame with a lifetime achievement award. On September 17, 2009, he was inducted into the Oklahoma Music Hall of Fame as a winner of the Eldon Shamblin Session Musician Award. In April 2012, he received the Bare Bones Film Festival's "Living Legend" Award.

== Bands ==
Bands and artists Frisco played and recorded with include:

- Steve Pryor
- Empty Pockets
- Brad Absher
- Tom Skinner's Science Project
- Larry Spears
- Susan Herndon
- Lata Gouveia
- Dustin Pittsley
- Jesse Aycock
- J. J. Cale
- Dustin and Jesse's Higher Education
- The Kevin Phariss Band
- Rodney Lay
- Widespread Panic
- Dennis Crouch
- Blazon Pearl
- Snuggle Naked
- Li'l Tee
- The Formerly Withs
- The Dylan Whitney Band
- Tex Waggoner
- Whirligig

== Acting ==
Frisco occasionally appeared in films and videos. He can be seen in the short film Melvin, A Midwestern Tale, and in the 2003 Disney remake of Where the Red Fern Grows. He also appeared in Lata Gouveia's documentary Red Dirt: Songs from the Dust. In July 2011, Frisco appeared in the full-length feature Red Dirt on 66: A Road Movie.

== Personal life and politics ==
Frisco, known among friends as the "Roxster," was a songwriter and novelist, whose published and unpublished works remain a representation of his ongoing study of life. His broad interests extended to restoring English Austin and Morris Mini Coopers and MGs, and work as a general mechanic, repairing a variety of vehicles to supplement his income as a musician. He was a fan of Terry Pratchett, reflected by the fact that his personal Mini Cooper was nicknamed "The Luggage". He was also an accomplished silversmith and stone cutter, producing a collection of artisan jewelry ranging from pendants to belt buckles. Frisco was outspoken in his views of life, and was an occasional candidate for political office in Tulsa.

== Discography ==
- Rocky Frisco (1996, independent release)
- Rocky Frisco (Expanded) (2014)
- An intimate moment with... the Legendary Rocky Frisco (2015)
