= Rewind: The Unreleased Recordings =

Studio album by JJ Cale
- Released: October 2, 2007
- Recorded: May 1973 to February 1983
- Genre: Americana; Roots rock Blues; The Tulsa Sound
- Length: 37:07
- Label: Time Life
- Producer: Audie Ashworth, JJ Cale

JJ Cale chronology
The Road to Escondido (2006)	Rewind: The Unreleased Recordings (2007)	Roll On (2009)

Professional ratings
Review scores
Source	Rating
AllMusic	3/5 stars

Rewind: The Unreleased Recordings is a compilation (studio) album by JJ Cale. It was released in October 2007. This album contains unreleased tracks recorded between 1971 and 1993 (most were cut with a band between 1973 and 1982).

The song "Out of Style" was previously released on the CD reissue of 5, where it was listed as the song it replaced, "Katy Kool Lady".

== Track listing ==
Tracks
Title	Composer	Length	Musicians	Notes
"Guess I Lose"	JJ Cale	2:51	JJ Cale	
"Waymore's Blues"	Waylon Jennings	2:39	Acoustic Guitar – Christine Lakeland Guitar, Vocals – J.J. Cale Musician [All Other] – Unknown ||recorded in 1971	
"Rollin'"	Randy Newman	2:55	JJ Cale Acoustic Guitar, Vocals – Christine Lakeland Engineer – Lou Bradley, Rick Horton Engineer [Assistant] – Freeman Ramsey Guitar, Vocals – J.J. Cale Musician [All Other] – Unknown Artist Piano – Toni Migliori*||	
"Golden Ring"	Eric Clapton	3:05	Acoustic Guitar – Christine Lakeland, Johnny Christopher Bass – Tommy Cogbill Drums – Kenny Buttrey Electric Guitar – Steve Gibson Engineer – Ron "Snake" Reynolds* Guitar, Vocals – J.J. Cale Musician [All Other] – Unknown Artist Organ [Hammond B3] – Bobby Emmons Piano – David Briggs (2) Synthesizer – Mike Lawler||	
"My Cricket"	Leon Russell	2:34	Acoustic Guitar – Johnny Christopher Backing Vocals – Christine Lakeland, Marilyn Davis Bass – Tommy Cogbill Drums – Kenny Buttrey Electric Guitar – Steve Gibson Engineer – Ron "Snake" Reynolds* Engineer [Background Vocals] – Chad Hailey Guitar, Vocals – J.J. Cale Organ [Hammond B3] – Bobby Emmons Piano – David Briggs (2) Synthesizer – Mike Lawler||	
"Since You Said Goodbye"	JJ Cale	2:46	Bass – Tim Drummond Drums – Karl Himmel, Jr* Electric Guitar, Vocals – J.J. Cale Engineer – David McKinley Mixed By [Mix Engineer] – Rick Horton Musician [All Other] – Unknown Artist Slide Guitar [Electric Slide "wah" Guitar] – Mac Gayden	recorded in 1973
"Seven Day Woman"	Christine Lakeland	2:20	Bass – Tim Drummond Drums – Jim Keltner Engineer – Paul Brown Guitar – Richard Thompson Guitar, Vocals – Christine Lakeland, J.J. Cale Organ [Hammond B3] – Spooner Oldham Percussion – Jim Karstein* Piano – Glen D. Hardin* ||	
"Bluebird"	JJ Cale	1:26	JJ Cale	
"My Baby and Me"	JJ Cale	2:21	JJ Cale	
"Lawdy Mama"	JJ Cale	2:56	JJ Cale	recorded in 1982
"Blue Sunday"	Bill Boatman	3:14	JJ Cale	
"Out of Style"	JJ Cale	2:24	JJ Cale	
"Ooh La La"	JJ Cale & Christine Lakeland	3:28	JJ Cale	
"All Mama's Children"	JJ Cale	2:08	JJ Cale	
