= Lata Gouveia =

Lata
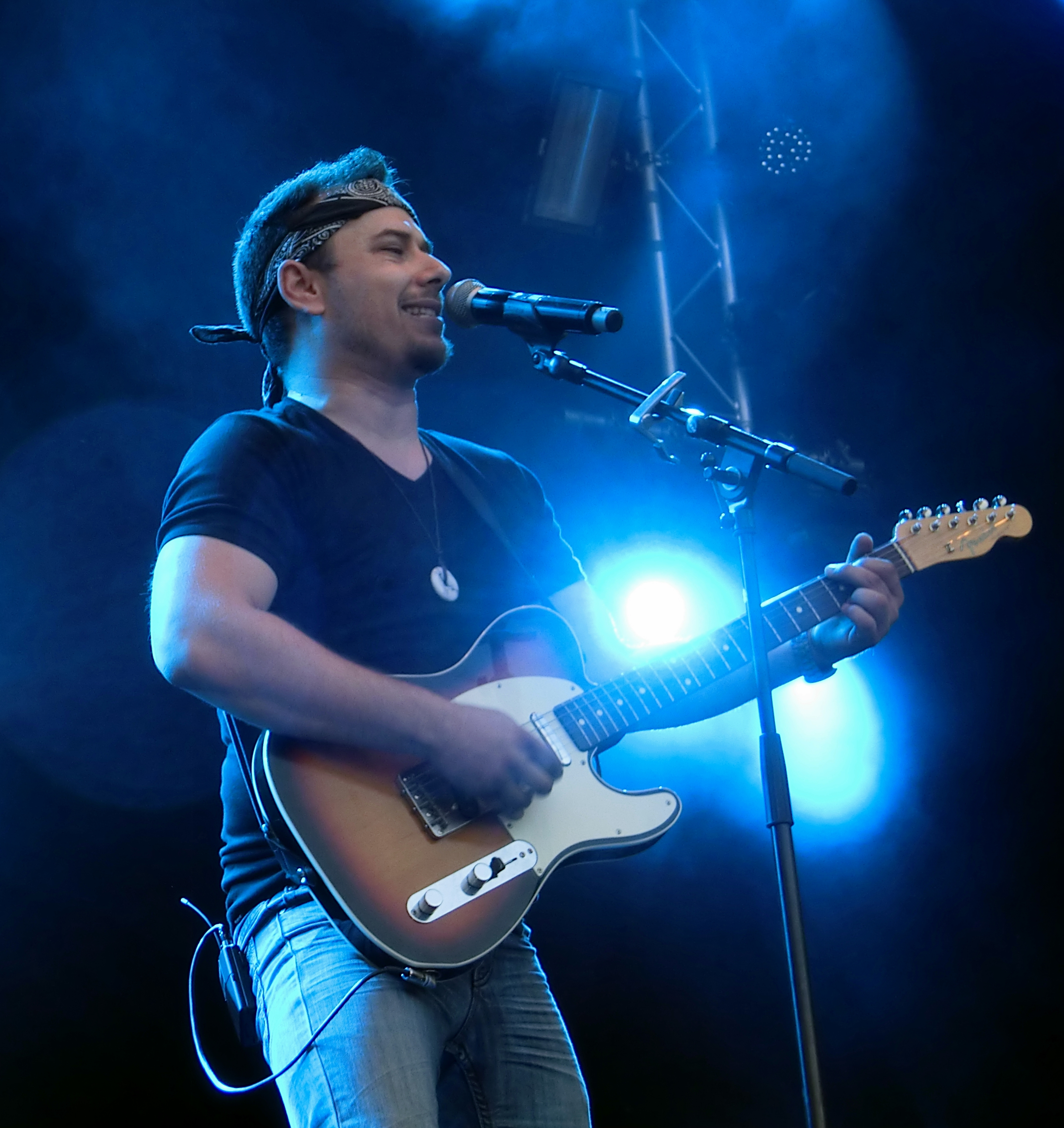

Background information
- Born: 19 February 1975 (age 50)
- Origin: Lisbon
- Genres: Red Dirt
- Instrument: Guitar
- Years active: 1993–present
- Labels: Grund Club Records
- Website: www.latagouveia.com

Lata (born 19 February 1975 in Lisbon) is a singer-songwriter, guitarist and producer. He is a well-known Red Dirt artist in Oklahoma and a reference of Americana music in Luxembourg, Germany, Belgium and the north of France.

== Life and career ==
He grew up in Luxembourg, where his father worked for the European Court of Justice. At the age of 17 he went to London, played music in bars, and was a member of various bands. From 1993 to 1999 he studied economics, at UCL University of London and politics at London Guildhall University at bachelor and master level London Metropolitan University. In 2001, he founded the company Desert Fish Productions and became the Portugal musical events manager for the animal rights organization LPDA, . From 2002 to 2006, he had a band called Lata Dog, releasing an album in 2004. In 2003 he wrote the song "Três desafios" for the soundtrack of the film "Tudo isto é Fado", directed by Luís Galvão Teles.

In 2007, he moved to Oklahoma at the invitation of Rocky Frisco, who had played together with JJ Cale, one of Gouveia's musical heroes. There he came into contact with many folk musicians and created close friendships with Tom Skinner, Dustin Pittsley and Steve Pryor. In 2009 Lata produced the documentary "Red Dirt: Songs from the Dust", which was awarded best music documentary at the Bare Bones International Film Festival. His 2008 album Road US-75 was released by Captiva Records, in San Marcos, Texas. His 2011 cover version of Monica Taylor's song "Young Mother" was featured on the NME website.

Since 2010 he is living in Luxembourg again and has become one brightest stars in the national scene, headlining several festivals and opening for Ayọ, Charlie Winston, Kiefer Sutherland, Alan Parsons, BAP, Sting and others. He composed the music for the documentary "Terra mia terra nostra" (2012), directed by Donato Rotunno. In 2013 he won the band contest Purple Idol and played at the Rock um Knuedler festival as support for BAP. In 2014 Lata released the album “Radio Nights”, followed by “Healed & Gone” in 2019. His recent band consists of Daniela Kruger (bass), Paul Porcelli (guitar) and Jeff Herr(drums).

== Discography ==
- Lead the way (with Lata Dog, 2004)
- Dead time (2007)
- Road US-75 (2008)
- Radio Night (Single, 2013)
- Chico (Single, 2014)
- Radio Nights (2014)
- Live at Kufa (2015)
- Radio Cuts 2008–2015 (EP, 2015)
- Healed & Gone (2018)
- Stay the same (2022)
