= If We Try =

If We Try may refer to:

- "If We Try" by Don McLean from the 1972 album Don McLean
- "If We Try" by Karen Ramirez from the 1998 album Distant Dreams
- "If We Try" by J. J. Cale from the 2019 album Stay Around
