= Roll On (J. J. Cale album) =

Studio album by J. J. Cale
- Released: February 24, 2009
- Recorded: 2003–2009
- Studio: Britannia Studio, Natura Digital Studio, Beggs, Oklahoma
- Genre: Americana; roots rock; blues; Tulsa sound
- Length: 41:04
- Label: Rounder
- Producer: Mike Kappus

J. J. Cale chronology
Rewind: The Unreleased Recordings (2007)	Roll On (2009)	Live in San Diego (Eric Clapton album) (2016)

J. J. Cale studio albums chronology
The Road to Escondido (with Eric Clapton) (2006)	Roll On (2009)	Stay Around (2019)

Professional ratings
Review scores
Source	Rating
AllMusic	4/5 stars
Entertainment Weekly	B
The Guardian	3/5 stars

Roll On is the fourteenth studio album by American singer-songwriter J. J. Cale (and the final one to be released in his lifetime), released on February 24, 2009, through Rounder Records. All songs were written by Cale; they include "Who Knew", "Former Me", and "Roll On", the last of which is a collaboration with Eric Clapton. Some tracks were recorded at sessions at David Teegarden's studio, north of Tulsa, Oklahoma, in 2003.

== Track listing ==
1. "Who Knew" 3:30
2. "Former Me" 2:48
3. "Where the Sun Don't Shine" 3:07
4. "Down to Memphis" 3:05
5. "Strange Days" 3:10
6. "Cherry Street" 3:43
7. "Fonda-Lina" 3:20
8. "Leaving in the Morning" 2:37
9. "Oh Mary" 3:34
10. "Old Friend" 3:55
11. "Roll On" (feat. Eric Clapton) 4:43
12. "Bring Down the Curtain" 2:51
13. "The Taker" (digital-only bonus track)
14. "Top Of The Hill" (digital-only bonus track)
15. "Worrying Off Your Mind" (digital-only bonus track)

The 3 digital-only bonus tracks are written by J.J. Cale.

"Worrying Off Your Mind" was later released physically (on Because Music label) on April 13, 2019 (at the occasion of Record Store Day) on vinyl format as the b-side of the posthumous J.J. Cale 7" single "Stay Around", the second single to be released from the album Stay Around.

== Personnel ==
=== Musicians ===
- David Teegarden - drums (1)
- Christine Lakeland acoustic guitar (1, 9, 10, 11)
- David Chapman - bass guitar (1)
- Jim Karstein - drums (9, 10)
- Walt Richmond - piano (9, 10)
- Bill Raffensperger - bass guitar (9, 10)
- Rocky Frisco - keyboards (10)
- Shelby Eicher - mandolin (10)
- Jim Markham - harmonica (10)
- Don White - guitar (10)
- Jim Keltner - drums (11)
- Mark Leonard - bass guitar (11)
- Glen Dee - piano (11)
- Eric Clapton - guitar (11)
- Steve Ripley - acoustic guitar (11)
- John "Juke" Logan - harmonica (11)
- J. J. Cale - vocals and all other instruments

=== Production ===
- Mike Test - engineer
- Mike Kappus - executive producer
- David Teegarden - recording
- David Chapman - recording
- Dana Brown - assistant recording
- Ed Barton - recording
- Chad Hailey - research
- Greg Calbi - mastering
- J. J. Cale - producer

== Charts ==
Chart (2009)	Peak position
Austrian Albums (Ö3 Austria)	62
Belgian Albums (Ultratop Flanders)	29
Belgian Albums (Ultratop Wallonia)	31
Croatian International Albums (HDU)	23
Dutch Albums (Album Top 100)	11
French Albums (SNEP)	23
German Albums (Offizielle Top 100)	32
Italian Albums (FIMI)	85
New Zealand Albums (RMNZ)	29
Scottish Albums (OCC)	95
Swedish Albums (Sverigetopplistan)	21
Swiss Albums (Schweizer Hitparade)	53
UK Albums (OCC)	90
UK Physical Albums (OCC)	89
US Billboard 200	113
US Top Internet Albums (Billboard)	113
