= Spooner Oldham =

American songwriter (born 1943)

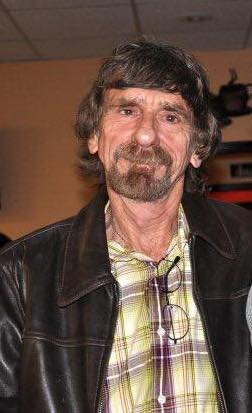
- Oldham in 2009 in Muscle Shoals, Alabama

Background information
- Born: Dewey Lindon Oldham Jr. June 14, 1943 (age 83); Center Star, Alabama; United States
- Genres: R&B; soul; rock
- Occupations: Songwriter; session musician
- Instrument: Keyboards
- Years active: 1960s–present
- Member of: Neil Young and the Chrome Hearts
- Formerly of: Muscle Shoals Rhythm Section
- Website: spooneroldhammusic.com

Dewey "Spooner" Lindon Oldham Jr. (born June 14, 1943) is an American songwriter and session musician. An organist, he recorded in Muscle Shoals, Alabama, at FAME Studios as part of the Muscle Shoals Rhythm Section on such hit R&B songs as Percy Sledge's "When a Man Loves a Woman", Wilson Pickett's "Mustang Sally", and Aretha Franklin's "I Never Loved a Man (The Way I Love You)". As a songwriter, Oldham teamed with Dan Penn to write such hits as "Cry Like a Baby" (the Box Tops), "I'm Your Puppet" (James and Bobby Purify), and "A Woman Left Lonely" and "It Tears Me Up" (Percy Sledge).

== Biography ==
Oldham is a native of Center Star, Alabama, United States. He was blinded in his right eye as a child; when reaching for a frying pan, he was hit in the eye by a spoon he knocked from a shelf. Schoolmates gave him the name "Spooner" as a result.

Oldham started his career in music by playing piano in a Dixieland jazz band while at Lauderdale County High School. He then attended classes at the University of North Alabama but turned instead to playing at FAME Studios. He moved to Memphis, Tennessee, in 1967 and teamed with Penn at Chips Moman's American Studios.

Oldham later moved to Los Angeles and has continued to be a sought-after backing musician, recording and performing with such artists as Bob Dylan, Aretha Franklin, Delaney Bramlett, Willy DeVille, Joe Cocker, the Hacienda Brothers, Linda Ronstadt, Jackson Browne, the Everly Brothers, Bob Seger, Dickey Betts, Cat Power, J.J. Cale, Frank Black, and The Mountain Goats.

Frequently a backing musician for Neil Young, he played on Young's critically acclaimed 1992 album Harvest Moon. Oldham also appeared in the concert film Neil Young: Heart of Gold and backed Crosby Stills Nash & Young on their 2006 Freedom of Speech tour.

In 1993, he joined a host of Memphis soul music veterans to record Arthur Alexander's comeback and un-intended final studio recording, the album Lonely Just Like Me.

In 2007, Oldham toured with the Drive-By Truckers on their The Dirt Underneath tour. In 2008, Oldham played on Last Days at the Lodge, the third album released by folk/soul singer Amos Lee. In May 2011, Oldham backed Pegi Young on a six-show tour of California.

Oldham worked with Scottish singer, Sharleen Spiteri on an album.

On June 28, 2025, Oldham was a backing musician for Neil Young's headline set at the Glastonbury Festival, which was broadcast live by the BBC, after an initial embargo placed by Young. Alexis Petridis of The Guardian said of the band, "This is essentially his earlier outfit Promise of the Real augmented by 82-year-old keyboard player Spooner Oldham, a man whose career stretches back to Aretha Franklin and Wilson Pickett's legendary late 60s albums."

== Awards ==
Oldham was inducted into the Rock and Roll Hall of Fame in 2009 as a sideman. In 2014, he was inducted into the Alabama Music Hall of Fame.

== Solo album ==
Pot Luck (Family Productions, 1972)

== Collaborations ==
With Arthur Alexander

- 1962: You Better Move On (Dot Records)
- 1993: Lonely Just Like Me (Elektra)

With Aretha Franklin

- I Never Loved a Man the Way I Love You (Atlantic Records, 1967)
- Aretha Arrives (Rhino Records, 1967)
- Lady Soul (Rhino Records, 1968)
- Aretha Now (Atlantic Records, 1968)
- Soul '69 (Atlantic Records, 1969)

With Wilson Pickett

- The Exciting Wilson Pickett (Atlantic Records, 1966)
- The Wicked Pickett (Atlantic Records, 1967)
- The Sound of Wilson Pickett (Atlantic Records, 1967)

With the Box Tops

- Cry Like a Baby (Mala Records, 1968)

With Maria Muldaur

- Maria Muldaur (Reprise Records, 1973)
- Waitress in a Donut Shop (Reprise Records, 1974)

With Bob Seger

- Beautiful Loser (Capitol Records, 1975)

With Rita Coolidge

- Rita Coolidge (A&M Records, 1971)

With Jackson Browne

- For Everyman (Asylum Records, 1973)

With Shelby Lynne

- Tears, Lies and Alibis (Everso, 2010)

With Steve Cropper

- Dedicated – A Salute to the 5 Royales (429 Records, 2011)

With Neil Young

- Comes a Time (Reprise Records, 1978)
- Old Ways (Reprise Records, 1985)
- Harvest Moon (Reprise Records, 1992)
- Unplugged (Reprise Records, 1993)
- Silver & Gold (Reprise Records, 2000)
- Road Rock Vol. 1 (Reprise Records, 2000)
- Prairie Wind (Reprise Records, 2005)
- A Treasure (Reprise Records, 2011)
- Talkin to the Trees (Reprise Records, 2025)

With Linda Ronstadt

- Don't Cry Now (Asylum Records, 1973)

With Jennifer Warnes

- Jennifer (Reprise Records, 1972)

With Billy Ray Cyrus

- The SnakeDoctor Circus (BBR, 2019)

With John Prine

- Aimless Love (Oh Boy Records, 1984)
- A John Prine Christmas (Oh Boy Records, 1994)

With Dan Penn

- Nobody's Fool (Bell Records, 1973)
- Do Right Man (Sire Records, 1994)
- Moments From This Theatre (Proper American, 1999)
- Something About the Night (Dandy Records, 2016)

With Frank Black

- Honeycomb (Cooking Vinyl, 2005)
- Fast Man Raider Man (Cooking Vinyl, 2006)

With Jewel

- Pieces of You (Atlantic Records, 1995)

With Tony Joe White

- Closer to the Truth (Festival Records, 1991)

With Sheryl Crow

- Threads (Big Machine Records, 2019)

With J. J. Cale

- 8 (Mercury Records, 1983)
- Travel-Log (Silvertone Records, 1990)
- Number 10 (Silvertone Records, 1992)
- Closer to You (Virgin Records, 1994)

With Amos Lee

- Last Days at the Lodge (Blue Note Records, 2008)

With Josh Groban

- Illuminations (143 Records, 2010)

With Bob Dylan

- Saved (Columbia Records, 1980)

With Keith Richards

- Crosseyed Heart (Reprise Records, 2015)

With Boz Scaggs

- Memphis (429 Records, 2013)

With Peter Parcek

- Mississippi Suitcase (Lightnin' Records, 2020)

With the Mountain Goats

- Dark in Here (Merge Records, 2021)

With Texas

- The Muscle Shoals Sessions (PIAS, 2024)

With Kate Campbell

- For the Living of These Days (Fame Studios, 2006)
