= Closer to You (J. J. Cale album) =

Studio album by J. J. Cale
- Released: August 23, 1994
- Studio: Capitol (Hollywood, California)
- Genre: Blues, Americana, Tulsa sound
- Length: 43:55
- Label: Delabel/Virgin
- Producer: JJ Cale

J. J. Cale chronology
Number 10 (1992)	Closer to You (1994)	Guitar Man (1996)

Closer to You is the eleventh studio album by American singer-songwriter J. J. Cale, released on August 23, 1994 through the independent French label Delabel and distributed by Virgin Records.

== Composition ==
Closer to You is noted for the change in sound from Cale’s previous albums, primarily due to the prominence of synthesizers, which Cale employs on five of the album's songs. Although the use of synthesizers may have seemed like a left turn for hardcore fans used to his laidback, rootsy sound, it was not new; Cale had used synthesizers on his 1976 Troubadour album. In an interview with Vintage Guitar in 2004, Cale acknowledged the dismay some fans felt, recalling:

…me playing with the synthesizer, everybody hated. [Then producer/manager] Audie Ashworth did the first eight albums, and those were kind of semi-popular, for an obscure songwriter like me. Then I started doing these albums in California with all synthesizers and me being the engineer. I liked those, but the folks wanted a little warmer kind of thing.

On Closer to You Cale used two bass players (electric and acoustic), three percussionists (including Jim Keltner), three guitarists (including Cale), two keyboardists (Spooner Oldham and Bill Payne), and three horn players. The horns are used on the closing track “Steve’s Song,” which AllMusic describes as a “hypnotically groovy instrumental.” The same review also complements the electronic treatment of Cale’s vocals on the title track, a technique that surprisingly makes him sound as down-to-earth as ever.” In truth, the majority of the songs boast the sound that Cale is so well-known for. The lusty “Slower Baby” and the breezy “Sho-Biz Blues” are characteristic Cale tracks, with the latter documenting the bleak realities of a musician’s life. (“The bus breaks down and the motel’s bad, you’re always in a stew…”) The foreboding “Borrowed Time” and “Brown Dirt” are meditations on mortality, the latter from the perspective of a Mississippi cotton picker who observes, “Brown dirt, somebody told me, be the last place you lay.” The gentle love song “Rose in the Garden” appeals for affection while the more direct “Like You Used To” asks a lover to “Tell me that you really love me, even if it ain't true.” The album also includes one live track, “Hard Love.”

== Reception ==
AllMusic said “with the dazzling Closer to You, J.J. Cale finds ever-newer surprises in his own remarkable corner of the musical world.”

== Track listing ==
All songs written by J. J. Cale.

1. "Long Way Home" – 2:50
- Backing Vocals – Christine Lakeland, Leslie Taylor
- Bass – Tim Drummond
- Drums – James Cruce
- Drums, Percussion – Jim Karstein*
- Guitar – Don Preston
- Piano, Organ – Bill Payne

2. "Sho-Biz Blues" – 3:39

- Bass – Tim Drummond
- Drums – James Cruce
- Drums, Percussion – Jim Karstein*
- Guitar – Don Preston (2)
- Piano, Organ – Bill Payne

3. "Slower Baby" – 5:00

- Drums, Percussion – Jim Karstein*
- Synthesizer – J.J. Cale

4. "Devil's Nurse" – 3:45

- Synthesizer – J.J. Cale

5. "Like You Used To" – 3:02

- Bass – Tim Drummond
- Drums – James Cruce
- Drums, Percussion – Jim Karstein*
- Guitar – Don Preston (2)
- Piano, Organ – Bill Payne

6 "Borrowed Time" – 4:13

- Bass – Tim Drummond
- Drums – James Cruce
- Drums, Percussion – Jim Karstein*
- Guitar – Don Preston (2)
- Organ – Spooner Oldham
- Piano, Organ – Bill Payne

7. "Rose in the Garden" – 3:00

- Backing Vocals – Christine Lakeland
- Bass – Tim Drummond
- Cello – Nancy Stein*
- Drums – James Cruce
- Drums, Percussion – Jim Karstein*
- Guitar – Don Preston (2)
- Piano, Organ – Bill Payne
- Viola – Marcy Dicterow-Vaj*
- Violin – Sid Page

8. "Brown Dirt" – 3:26

- Synthesizer – J.J. Cale

9. "Hard Love" – 4:18

- Synthesizer – J.J. Cale

10. "Ain't Love Funny" – 2:43

- Accordion – Garth Hudson
- Bass – Tim Drummond
- Drums – Jim Keltner, Jim Karstein*
- Guitar, Backing Vocals – Christine Lakeland
- Violin – Doug Atwell

11. "Closer to You" – 2:46

- Synthesizer – J.J. Cale

12. "Steve's Song" – 4:02

- Acoustic Bass – Larry Taylor
- Bass – Tim Drummond
- Drums – James Cruce, Jim Keltner
- Drums, Percussion – Jim Karstein*
- Guitar – Christine Lakeland, Don Preston (2)
- Organ – Spooner Oldham
- Piano, Organ – Bill Payne
- Saxophone – Lee Allen
- Trombone – George Bohanon
- Trumpet – Steve Madaio
