= 5 (J. J. Cale album) =

Studio album by J. J. Cale
- Released: August 1979
- Studios: Crazy Mama (Nashville, Tennessee) (tracks 1,6,7,12); The Lakehouse (Nashville, Tennessee) (tracks 2,4,5,9,10); Columbia (Nashville, Tennessee) (track 3); Woodland (Nashville, Tennessee) (tracks 8,11)
- Length: 37:50
- Labels: UK: Island; USA: MCA
- Producers: Audie Ashworth, J.J. Cale

J. J. Cale chronology
Troubadour (1976)	5 (1979)	Shades (1981)

5 is the fifth studio album by J. J. Cale, released in August 1979.

It was his first album in three years. When the album was re-issued on CD, "Katy Kool Lady" was replaced by a new song listed as "Out of Style," though it was still listed as the former on the CD. "Out of Style" is also included on the 2007 album Rewind: The Unreleased Recordings under its proper title. There is still no U.S. domestic release of the song "Katy Kool Lady" on CD.

== Background ==
By 1979, Cale had recorded four albums, his debut Naturally being the most commercially successful and containing the minor hit "Crazy Mama". While his albums did not sell in high numbers, Cale enjoyed great success as a songwriter when other artists recorded his songs, like Eric Clapton ("After Midnight" in 1970 and "Cocaine" in 1977) and Lynyrd Skynyrd ("Call Me the Breeze" in 1974), providing the Oklahoma singer with a degree of financial security to pursue his musical vision. By the time he recorded 5, Cale had also met singer and guitarist Christine Lakeland, and the LP marks her first appearance on his albums. In the 2005 documentary To Tulsa and Back, Lakeland says they met backstage at a prison benefit show featuring B.B. King and Waylon Jennings. Cale and Lakeland would later marry.

== Recording ==
As the title suggests, 5 was Cale's fifth album with Audie Ashworth producing and was recorded in various studios in Nashville, where Cale was living at the time. Most of the tracks were recorded and mixed at The Lakehouse, Old Hickory, Tennessee. William Ruhlmann observes in his AllMusic review of the album that "As Cale's influence on others expanded, he just continued to turn out the occasional album of bluesy, minor-key tunes. This one was even sparer than usual, with the artist handling bass as well as guitar on many tracks. Listened to today, it sounds so much like a Dire Straits album, it's scary." However, Cale developed this intimate sound and refined it throughout the decade: a swampy mix of country, folk, R&B, jazz, and rock 'n' roll played in a restrained manner. Unlike on his previous album Troubadour, the guitar sound on 5 was very clean, with Cale ignoring the new disco and punk music genres trending at the time.

Thematically, the songs on 5 are dominated by lust, typified by tracks like "Boilin' Pot", "I'll Make Love to You Anytime" (recorded by Eric Clapton for his 1978 album Backless), and "Too Much for Me" ("She tickled my toe and she kissed my ear, told me not to worry, told me not to fear..."). "Mona" and the cautionary "Sensitive Kind" are more tender in tone, while "Friday" and "Let's Go to Tahiti" speak to the desire of escaping the monotony of working life. "Fate of a Fool" and the druggy "Thirteen Days" tell of the high and lows of being a touring musician.

"Katy Kool Lady" was co-written by Cale and Christine Lakeland, and it was released as a single with the non-album track "Jaurez Blues" as the B-side. "Sensitive Kind" was covered by Santana on their 1981 LP Zebop!. "Don't Cry Sister" was re-recorded in a rockier style by Cale and Clapton on their 2006 collaborative (studio) album The Road to Escondido. A live version of the song also appeared in 2016 on the album Live in San Diego.

== Paradise Studios ==
The release of 5 coincided with a live session with Leon Russell, recorded at Russell's Paradise Studios in June 1979 in Los Angeles. The previously unseen footage was discovered in Nashville in 2001 and features several tracks from 5, including "Sensitive Kind", "Lou-Easy-Ann", "Fate of a Fool", "Boilin' Pot", and "Don't Cry Sister". Lakeland also performs with Cale's band. While living in California in the late sixties, Cale worked in Russell's studio as an engineer. The footage was officially released in 2003 as J.J. Cale featuring Leon Russell: In Session at the Paradise Studios.

== Reception ==
Professional ratings
Review scores
Source	Rating
AllMusic	2/5 stars
Music Week	3/4 stars
The Rolling Stone Album Guide	2/5 stars

Paste, All About Jazz, and Glide Magazine highly praised "Don't Cry Sister". From 1984 until 2004, the song appeared on the compilation albums Special Edition (1984, Island), Best of J. J. Cale (1993, Island), Anyway the Wind Blows: The Anthology (1997, Island), The Definitive Collection (1998, Island), Classic J.J. Cale: The Universal Masters Collection (1999, Universal), 20th Century Masters – The Millennium Collection: The Best of J.J. Cale (2002, Universal), Singers And Songwriters: Pure & Simple (2003, Time), and The Ultimate Collection (2004, Universal).

== Track listing ==
All songs by J. J. Cale, except where noted.

No.	Title	Writer(s)	Length
1.	"Thirteen Days"		2:50
2.	"Boilin' Pot"		2:51
3.	"I'll Make Love to You Anytime"		3:13
4.	"Don't Cry Sister"		2:14
5.	"Too Much for Me"		3:13
6.	"Sensitive Kind"		5:10
7.	"Friday"		4:13
8.	"Lou-Easy-Ann"		2:47
9.	"Let's Go to Tahiti"	Bill Boatman, Roger Tillotson	2:52
10.	"Katy Kool Lady" ("Out of Style" on CD)	J.J. Cale, Christine Lakeland	2:24
11.	"Fate of a Fool"		2:54
12.	"Mona"		3:16

== Personnel ==
- J. J. Cale - guitars, bass (tr. 2–5, 9, 10), piano (tr. 8), drums (tr. 10), vocals
- Christine Lakeland - voices, organ, rhythm guitar (tr. 4, 11), percussion (tr. 10), piano (tr. 10), acoustic rhythm guitar (tr. 8)
- Billy Cox - bass (tr. 1)
- Carl Radle - bass (tr. 6, 7, 12)
- Nick Rather - bass (tr. 8, 11)
- Karl Himmel - drums (tr. 1)
- Kenny Buttrey - drums (tr. 3)
- Buddy Harman - drums (tr. 6, 7, 12)
- Jimmy Karstein - drums (tr. 8, 11), congas (tr. 6)
- David Briggs - piano (tr. 6, 7)
- Larry Bell - electric piano (tr. 8), organ (tr. 11)
- Bill Boatman - electric rhythm guitar (tr. 8), fiddle (tr. 11)
- Bill Kenner - mandolin (tr. 12)
- Farrell Morris - vibraphone (tr. 6)
- Sherry Porter - voices
- Shelly Kurland - strings
- Carl Gorodetzy - strings
- Roy Christensen - strings
- Marv Chantry - strings
- Cam Mullins - string arrangements
- George Tidwell - horns
- Don Sheffield - horns
- Dennis Goode - horns
- Terry Williams - horns
- John Kosh - art director and album cover designer

== Certifications ==
Region	Certification	Certified units/sales
Australia (ARIA)	Platinum	50,000^{^}
^{^} Shipments figures based on certification alone.
