= The Breeze: An Appreciation of JJ Cale =

Studio album by Eric Clapton & Friends
- Released: July 29, 2014
- Recorded: 2013–2014
- Genres: Rock, blues rock, country rock
- Length: 51:33
- Label: Bushbranch / Surfdog
- Producers: Eric Clapton, Simon Climie

Eric Clapton chronology
Old Sock (2013)	The Breeze: An Appreciation of JJ Cale (2014)	Forever Man (2015)

Professional ratings
Aggregate scores
Source	Rating
Metacritic	65/100
Review scores
Source	Rating
AllMusic	2.5/5 stars
Drowned in Sound	6/10

The Breeze: An Appreciation of JJ Cale is a collaborative studio album featuring Eric Clapton and a host of other musicians. It consists of covers of songs by J. J. Cale, who had died the previous year. It was named after Cale's 1972 single "Call Me the Breeze". It was produced by Clapton and Simon Climie. The guests invited on the album include Tom Petty, Mark Knopfler, Willie Nelson and John Mayer.

== Track listing ==
All songs written by J.J. Cale except where indicated

No.	Title	Writer(s)	Vocals	Length
1.	"Call Me the Breeze"		Eric Clapton	3:07
2.	"Rock and Roll Records"		Clapton & Tom Petty	2:19
3.	"Someday"	Cale, Walt Richmond	Mark Knopfler	3:48
4.	"Lies"		Clapton & John Mayer	3:07
5.	"Sensitive Kind"		Don White	5:17
6.	"Cajun Moon"		Clapton	2:28
7.	"Magnolia"		Mayer	3:42
8.	"I Got the Same Old Blues"		Petty & Clapton	3:03
9.	"Songbird"		Willie Nelson & Clapton	2:56
10.	"Since You Said Goodbye"		Clapton	3:01
11.	"I'll Be There (If You Ever Want Me)"	Ray Price, Rusty Gabbard	White & Clapton	2:37
12.	"The Old Man and Me"		Petty	2:56
13.	"Train to Nowhere"		Knopfler, White & Clapton	4:51
14.	"Starbound"		Nelson	2:03
15.	"Don't Wait"	Cale, Christine Lakeland	Clapton & Mayer	2:47
16.	"Crying Eyes"		Clapton, Christine Lakeland	3:31

== Personnel ==
=== Artists ===
- Eric Clapton – vocals (tracks 1, 2, 4, 6–11, 13, 15 & 16), guitars (all tracks), dobro (track 11)
- Tom Petty – vocals (tracks 2, 8 & 12)
- Mark Knopfler – guitar (tracks 3 & 13), vocals (tracks 3 & 13)
- John Mayer – guitar (tracks 4, 7 & 15), vocals (tracks 4 & 7)
- Willie Nelson – guitar (tracks 9 & 14), vocals (tracks 9 & 14)
- Don White – guitar (tracks 3, 5 & 13), vocals (tracks 5, 11 & 13)
- Reggie Young – guitar (tracks 2, 6 & 8)
- Derek Trucks – guitar (tracks 14 & 16)
- Albert Lee – guitar (tracks 1 & 11)
- David Lindley – guitar (tracks 9 & 16)
- Don Preston – guitar (tracks 3 & 13)
- Christine Lakeland – guitar (track 3), vocals (track 16)
- Mike Campbell – guitar
- Doyle Bramhall II – guitar (track 10)
- Greg Leisz – pedal steel guitar (tracks 12 & 14)
- Nathan East – bass
- Simon Climie – Wurlitzer electric piano, Hammond organ, piano, drum programming, percussion, backing vocals (track 9)
- Walt Richmond – Wurlitzer electric piano, Hammond organ, piano
- Jimmy Markham – harmonica (track 13)
- Mickey Raphael – harmonica (tracks 3, 9 & 14)
- Michelle John – backing vocals (tracks 4, 5, 9 & 13)
- Sharon White – backing vocals (tracks 4, 5, 9 & 13)
- Jim Keltner – drums
- James Cruce – drums
- Jim Karstein – drums
- David Teegarden – drums
- Satnam Ramgotra – tablas

=== Production ===
- Producers – Eric Clapton and Simon Climie
- Additional Production on tracks 9 & 14 – Buddy Cannon
- Recorded by Alan Douglas
- Additional Engineering – Tony Castle, Bobby Tis and Ryan Ulyate.
- Assistant Engineers – Jacob Dennis, Joe Kearns, Tim Marchiafava, Derek Parnell and Wendy Seidman.
- Mixed by Simon Climie
- Mastered by Bob Ludwig at Gateway Mastering (Portland, ME).
- Session Coordinator – Debbie Johnson
- Art Direction and Design – Catherine Roylance
- Cover Image – Michael Putland
- Cover Illustration – Yoshiyuki Sadamoto
- Press Management – Kristen Foster

== Chart performance ==
=== Weekly charts ===
Chart (2014–15)	Peak position
Australian Albums (ARIA)	17
Austrian Albums (Ö3 Austria)	8
Belgian Albums (Ultratop Flanders)	7
Belgian Albums (Ultratop Wallonia)	5
Canadian Albums (Billboard)	2
Croatian International Albums (HDU)	14
Czech Albums (ČNS IFPI)	2
Danish Albums (Hitlisten)	1
Dutch Albums (Album Top 100)	1
Finnish Albums (Suomen virallinen lista)	20
German Albums (Offizielle Top 100)	2
Greek Albums (IFPI)	32
Hungarian Albums (MAHASZ)	34
Irish Albums (IRMA)	14
Italian Albums (FIMI)	11
Japanese Albums (Oricon)	19
South Korean Albums (Circle)	59
South Korean International Albums (Circle)	8
New Zealand Albums (RMNZ)	3
Norwegian Albums (VG-lista)	2
Polish Albums (ZPAV)	4
Scottish Albums (Official Charts)	4
Spanish Albums (Promusicae)	13
Swedish Albums (Sverigetopplistan)	40
Swiss Albums (Schweizer Hitparade)	2
UK Albums (Official Charts)	3
UK Album Downloads (Official Charts)	15
US Billboard 200	2
US Digital Albums (Billboard)	4
US Independent Albums (Billboard)	1
US Top Rock Albums (Billboard)	2
US Indie Store Album Sales (Billboard)	2

=== Year-end charts ===
Chart (2014)	Position
Australian Country Albums (ARIA)	28
Austrian Albums (Ö3 Austria)	82
Belgian Albums (Ultratop Flanders)	107
Belgian Albums (Ultratop Wallonia)	102
Danish Albums (Hitlisten)	28
Dutch Albums (MegaCharts)	19
German Albums (Offizielle Top 100)	61
Norwegian Albums (VG-lista)	60
Swiss Albums (Schweizer Hitparade)	59
UK Albums (OCC)	123
US Billboard 200	117
US Independent Albums (Billboard)	11
US Top Rock Albums (Billboard)	23

=== Certifications and sales ===
Region	Certification	Certified units/sales
Germany (BVMI)	Gold	100,000^{‡}
Netherlands (NVPI)	Gold	20,000^{‡}
Poland (ZPAV)	Platinum	20,000^{‡}
United Kingdom (BPI)	Silver	60,000^{‡}
United States	—	111,000
^{‡} Sales+streaming figures based on certification alone.
