= Guitar Man (J. J. Cale album) =

Studio album by J. J. Cale
- Released: June 25, 1996
- Genre: Blues, Americana, Tulsa Sound
- Length: 38:13
- Label: – CD: Delabel (promo edition: DE 3687)/Virgin (7243 8 41480 2 7) (1996) / Virgin (CDVIR 48) (2011); – Digital Download: Virgin / Parlophone (#0724384148058)

J. J. Cale chronology
Closer to You (1994)	Guitar Man (1996)	To Tulsa and Back (2004)

Guitar Man is the twelfth studio album by American musician J. J. Cale, released on June 25, 1996 by Virgin Records.

== Background ==
After taking a six-year break from the music business, Cale recorded four albums in the same amount of time in the early 90s. Ironically, in an era of grunge and the MTV Unplugged trends, Cale became immersed in electronics and synthesizers. “I did the unplugged, live kind of thing in the ‘70’s and the ‘80’s,” he told one interviewer. “I’ve gone to the other direction now that all that’s become popular. Been there done that! They didn’t call it unplugged in those days but that is what it was…There is a fascination about electronics…It is an art form in itself.”

After Guitar Man, Cale would not release another album for eight years.

== Composition ==
Produced by Cale, Guitar Man differs from the albums he made in the seventies and early eighties in that while those records featured numerous top-shelf session players, Cale provided the instrumentation on Guitar Man himself, augmented by wife Christine Lakeland on guitar and background vocals and drummer James Cruce on the opener “Death in the Wilderness.” In his AllMusic review of the LP, Thom Owens writes, “Although he has recorded Guitar Man as a one-man band effort, it sounds remarkably relaxed and laid-back, like it was made with a seasoned bar band.” In assessing the album, rock writer Brian Wise of Rhythm Magazine commented, “‘Lowdown’ is typical Cale shuffle, ‘Days Go By’ gives a jazzy feel to a song about smoking a certain substance while the traditional ‘Old Blue’ reprises a song that many might first have heard with The Byrds version during the Gram Parsons era.” The traditional song “Old Blue” long fascinated Cale, who reflected, “I have heard that song all my life, it’s an old folk song. I didn’t get quite the way the original went. I’ve changed some of the lyrics to fit my style. I like the song. I’m a big dog lover and animal lover. I have heard the song off and on in my subconscious for years.” On the ecologically minded “Wilderness,” Cale deems the planet “a hopeless case, I guess,” and surmises “We'll mow it down, we'll rape the ground 'til there's nothing left to abuse.”

== Reception ==
Thom Owens of AllMusic gave the album an average review and said “there's a handful of very good songs, but there's nothing on the level of his previous classics. It's just another pleasant J.J. Cale album, nothing more but nothing less, either.”

== Track listing ==
All songs written by J. J. Cale, except where indicated.

1. "Death in the Wilderness" 4:58
2. "It's Hard to Tell" 2:40
3. "Days Go By" 3:27
4. "Low Down" 2:48
5. "This Town" 2:54
6. "Guitar Man" 4:02
7. "If I Had a Rocket" 3:02
8. "Perfect Woman" 2:10
9. "Old Blue" - Traditional 2:42
10. "Doctor Told Me" 3:12
11. "Miss Ol' St Louie" 2:33
12. "Nobody Knows" 3:51

== Personnel ==
- J. J. Cale : Vocals, Guitar
- Christine Lakeland : Guitar, vocals on Death In The Wilderness
- James Cruce : Drums on Death In The Wilderness
