= Don't Cry Sister =

Song by J. J. Cale

from the album 5
- Length: 2:15
- Label: Island · MCA
- Songwriter: J. J. Cale
- Producer: J. J. Cale · Audie Ashworth

"Don't Cry Sister" is a song written and first recorded by American folk and bluegrass guitarist J. J. Cale for his 1979 studio album 5. The original version of the tune of two minute and fifteen seconds duration is written in the musical key of C minor. It gained new success in 2006, when Eric Clapton recorded the song with Cale.

From 1984 until 2004, the song appeared on the compilation albums Special Edition (1984, Island), Best of J. J. Cale (1993, Island), Anyway the Wind Blows: The Anthology (1997, Island), The Definitive Collection (1998, Island), Classic J.J. Cale: The Universal Masters Collection (1999, Universal), 20th Century Masters – The Millennium Collection: The Best of J.J. Cale (2002, Universal), Singers And Songwriters: Pure & Simple (2003, Time), and The Ultimate Collection (2004, Universal).

In 2006, Cale recorded the song along with British rock musician Eric Clapton for their collaborative effort The Road to Escondido which went on to become a global Platinum-selling release. While the publications Paste, All About Jazz, and Glide Magazine highly praised the new interpretation of the song, Twisted Ear called the version "terrible". A live version of their recording appeared in 2016 on the album Live in San Diego.

In total, the song was released on over 20 albums.
