= To Tulsa and Back =

Studio album by J. J. Cale
- Released: June 8, 2004
- Recorded: June 2003
- Studios: Natura Digital Studio, Tulsa, Oklahoma
- Genres: Americana; Roots rock Blues; Southern rock Tulsa sound
- Length: 49.29
- Label: Blue Note
- Producers: Mike Test, David Teegarden

J. J. Cale chronology
Guitar Man (1998)	To Tulsa and Back (2004)	The Road to Escondido (2006)

To Tulsa and Back is the thirteenth studio album by American singer-songwriter J. J. Cale, released on June 8, 2004.

== Background ==
Between 1996 and 2003, Cale released no new music but admiration for his work and musicianship only grew among his fans and admirers. In the 2002 memoir Shakey, Neil Young told biographer Jimmy McDonugh that Cale was one of his favourite guitarists of all time, comparing him to Jimi Hendrix. Mark Knopfler and Eric Clapton were also effusive in their praise for the Oklahoma troubadour, but Cale’s early 90s output left him at odds with the music industry and, to an extent, his own fans, which he acknowledged in an interview with Vintage Guitar:

The last four albums, with me playing with the synthesizer, everybody hated. [Then producer/manager] Audie Ashworth did the first eight albums, and those were kind of semi-popular, for an obscure songwriter like me. Then I started doing these albums in California with all synthesizers and me being the engineer. I liked those, but the folks wanted a little warmer kind of thing.

== Recording ==
Always accustomed to doing things his own way, Cale handled nearly all the instrumentation on his previous album Guitar Man, recording in his home studio, but for To Tulsa and Back he opted to change his approach by regrouping with long-time producer Audie Ashworth, as he recalled to Dan Forte:

A few years ago, before Audie passed away, I said, “I’ve been making synthesizer records; ain’t nobody likes ’em but me. I’ll come to Nashville, and we’ll hire all the guys who are still alive who played on the first albums.” Audie said, “Great.” I told him to book some studio time. But then he passed away, and I put the deal on hold. Eventually, I decided to do the same program, only go to Tulsa instead of Nashville. David Teagarden, of Teagarden & Van Winkle, is a drummer who has a studio, so I told him to get the guys in Tulsa that we used to play with when we were kids. I cut some there, and had some demos I did here at the house, and I sent them all to Bas [Hartong] and to Mike [Test].

The album returns to the style and sound Cale became famous for – a mix of laid-back shuffles, jazzy chords, and bluesy rock and roll with layered vocals – but it also embraces technology, resulting in a cleaner sound than on Cale’s earlier albums. In his AllMusic review of To Tulsa and Back, Thom Jurek writes, “Cale steeps himself in technology and evokes the moods and frameworks of music that intersect with the blues or stand in opposition to them. The keyboards, drum loops, and horns on this record are as pervasive as the guitars…It's just that the sheeny beats and clean synth lines feel odd when juxtaposed against the murky lyrics and Cale's wispy, smoke-weathered voice.” The horns on the album came from synthesizers, with Cale later saying, “[Keyboardist] Walt Richmond did the [synth] horns on ‘My Gal,’ and they almost sound like real horns. I did them on everything else – either on keyboard or MIDI’ed out of my Casio [PG-380] guitar. You can plug the MIDI from the guitar into any synthesizer that has MIDI.”

Lyrically, Cale makes a rare foray into political songwriting with “The Problem,” an indictment of then-President George W. Bush with lines like, “The man in charge, he don't know what he's doing, he don't know the world has changed.” “Stone River” is an understated protest song about the water crisis in the West. (Cale expressed similar ecological concerns on “Death in the Wilderness” from his previous LP Guitar Man.) The blue collar “One Step” examines the struggles of the working class, while “Rio” recalls several of the songs on 1990’s Travel-Log, such as “Tijuana” and “New Orleans,” and pays tribute to the Brazilian city. Cale expresses his love for the blues on “These Blues” and displays his banjo skills on “Another Song,” although he was unimpressed by his skills on the instrument, later telling Derek Haley, "I have not learned how to play it, and I’m embarrassed about that cut. I’m a shade tree banjo player. I’ve always noodled on the banjo, but never in public or in front of anybody. It’s something I like to do. I wrote that song here in the kitchen, man. I had my DAT recorder on and my mic set up, and everybody at the record company liked the song so I let them go ahead and put it out. But, the banjo playing is pretty bad, so I don’t want to talk about no banjo playing.” Women and romance are the subjects of several songs, such as “Fancy Dancer,” the funky “New Lover," and "My Gal." Cale said of "My Gal," "That particular song I wrote in Nashville many years ago. When I got ready to make the album, I didn’t re-write it, but I just used the words from it. The original demo sounds nothing like that. And we did it in that kind of rhythm and blues kind of bag, you know?"

In 2005 a documentary called To Tulsa and Back:On Tour with J.J. Cale was released. It featured interviews with Cale, wife Christine Lakeland, Eric Clapton, and other family and band members as well as behind the scenes tour footage.

== Reception ==
Professional ratings
Review scores
Source	Rating
AllMusic	4/5 stars

AllMusic gives the album four out of five stars, with Thom Jurek singling out the closing track for praise: "The album closes with Cale playing a lone banjo on ‘Another Song,’ a mournful Appalachian ballad that feels like it comes from out of the heart of the Dust Bowl, it's full of ghosts and shadows and aches with the weight and displacement of longing as history."

== Track listing ==
All songs written by J. J. Cale.

1. A1. "My Gal" 4:23
2. A2. "Chains of Love" 3:37
3. A3. "New Lover" 3:12
4. A4 "One Step" 3:20
5. B1. "Stone River" 3:42
6. B2. "The Problem" 4:31
7. B3. "Homeless" 3:25
8. C1. "Fancy Dancer" 4:50
9. C2. "Rio" 3:46
10. C3. "These Blues" 3:49
11. D1. "Motormouth" 3:17
12. D2. "Blues for Mama" 4:07
13. D3. "Another Song" 3:24

== Personnel ==
- J. J. Cale – vocals, guitar, synthesizer, banjo, all other instruments
- Shelby Eicher – fiddle, mandolin (tracks 1, 4, 6, 10, 11)
- Christine Lakeland – guitar (tracks 1, 4, 6, 10, 11)
- Don White – guitar (tracks 1, 4, 6, 10, 11)
- Bill Raffensperger – bass (tracks 1, 4, 6, 10, 11)
- Gary Gilmore – bass (tracks 1, 4, 6, 10, 11)
- Walt Richmond – keyboards (tracks 1, 4, 6, 10, 11)
- Rocky Frisco – keyboards (tracks 1, 4, 6, 10, 11)
- Jim Karstein – drums
- Jimmy Markham – harmonica
- Mike Test – recording producer (tracks 2, 3, 5, 7–9, 12, 13)
- Charles Johnson – engineer
- David Teegarden – recording producer, engineer (tracks 1, 4, 6, 10, 11)
- Dana Brown – engineer
- David Chapman – engineer
- Greg Calbi – mastering
- Stéphane Sednaoui – photography
- Éric Pillault – graphic design
- Mike Kappus – executive producer
- Bas Hartong – executive producer

== Chart performance ==
=== Weekly charts ===
Chart (2004–2005)	Peak position
Belgian Albums (Ultratop Flanders)	45
Belgian Albums (Ultratop Wallonia)	62
Dutch Albums (Album Top 100)	53
German Albums (Offizielle Top 100)	82
Greek Albums (IFPI)	36
Italian Albums (FIMI)	54
Swiss Albums (Schweizer Hitparade)	99
