= 8 (J. J. Cale album) =

#8

Studio album by J. J. Cale
- Released: 1983
- Recorded: 1982–1983
- Studios: Amigo (Los Angeles, California); The Alley (North Hollywood, California); Columbia (Nashville, Tennessee)
- Length: 29:57
- Label: Mercury
- Producers: Audie Ashworth; J. J. Cale

J. J. Cale chronology
Grasshopper (1982)	#8 (1983)	Travel-Log (1989)

#8 is the eighth studio album by American musician J. J. Cale, released in 1983.

== Background and recording ==
After recording five albums in the seventies, Cale moved from Nashville to California, eventually settling in a trailer park in Anaheim, California. He would record three albums in three years, but by the time #8 was released, he was burned out. As Cale recalls in the 2005 documentary To Tulsa and Back, "I lived out on the west coast in the sixties. So I spent most of the seventies in Nashville and in about 1980 I decided I wanted to move back out to the west coast just to get a different view of life. I felt that eight albums was enough, you know. I needed a break so I took five years off."

For #8, Cale reconvened with producer Audie Ashworth and the usual group of ace session musicians who played on his previous records, including drummer Jim Keltner and keyboardist Spooner Oldham, as well as Fairport Convention guitarist Richard Thompson, among many others. In fact, on the track "Takin' Care of Business," Cale name drops many of his musician friends in tribute. ("Tim Drummond's on the bass, Jim Keltner's on the drums, They'll put it right on you for a shot of rum...") Musically, #8 is less polished than his previous album Grasshopper, with most of the songs having a rock and roll swagger. Lyrically speaking, however, with the exception of "Takin' Care of Business," the subject matter on #8 is unremittingly grim. The cynical "Money Talks" ("You'd be surprised the friends you can buy with small change..."), "Hard Times," "Unemployment," and "Livin' Here Too" deal with harsh economic woes and dissatisfaction with life in general. "Losers," a song co-written with wife Christine Lakeland, explores a similar theme, while "Trouble in the City," like his earlier song "Downtown L.A.," presents the seedy underbelly of urban life. The bitter "People Lie" addresses mendacity, with Cale counting governors, princes, preachers, and presidents among those who "when they say one thing, they mean something else completely". The provocative "Reality" speaks to using drugs to escape many of the problems he chronicles on the album, singing "One toke of reefer, a little cocaine, one shot of morphine and things begin to change," and adding "When reality leaves, so do the blues."

Memphis songwriter Paul Craft composed "Teardrops in My Tequila." "Paul Craft, you know who he is?" Cale once asked an interviewer. "Paul Craft and I got to be cronies. I was a big fan of his, some of the songs he wrote just laid me out..."

== Reception ==
Professional ratings
Review scores
Source	Rating
AllMusic	2/5 stars
The Rolling Stone Album Guide	2/5 stars

This album would be the first in Cale's career to not make the charts, which probably was a major factor in him taking a sabbatical from the music business. AllMusic: "Twelve years and eight albums into his recording career, Cale's approach has changed little, and here is another collection of groove tunes that act as platforms for the artist's intricate guitar playing."

== Track listing ==
All tracks are written by J. J. Cale, except where noted.

No.	Title	Writer(s)	Length
1.	"Money Talks"	Cale, Christine Lakeland	4:19
2.	"Losers"	Cale, Lakeland	2:40
3.	"Hard Times"		3:55
4.	"Reality"		2:22
5.	"Takin' Care of Business"		2:10
6.	"People Lie"		2:11
7.	"Unemployment"		4:09
8.	"Trouble in the City"		3:22
9.	"Teardrops in My Tequila"	Paul Craft	2:15
10.	"Livin' Here Too"		2:18

== Personnel ==
- J. J. Cale – vocals, drums, guitars, piano
- Christine Lakeland – vocals, guitar
- Glen Hardin – piano
- Spooner Oldham – organ
- Tony Migliore – piano
- Harold Bradley – guitars
- Ray Edenton – guitars
- Steve Ripley – guitars
- Richard Thompson – guitars
- Weldon Myrick – steel guitar
- Tim Drummond – bass
- Bob Moore – bass
- David Waddel – bass
- Jim Keltner – drums
- Karl Himmel – drums
- Buddy Harman – drums
- Jimmy Karstein – drums

=== Production ===
- Audie Ashworth – producer
- J. J. Cale – producer, engineer, mixing
- Paul Brown – engineer, mixing
- Chad Hailey – engineer, mixing
- Richard Horton – engineer, mixing
- Eddy Schreyer – mastering at Capitol Studios (Hollywood, California)
- J. Vigon – design, art direction
- Roger Tillson – design concept
