= Number 10 (J. J. Cale album) =

Studio album by J. J. Cale
- Released: November 10, 1992
- Genre: Blues, Americana
- Length: 38:20
- Label: Silvertone/BMG
- Producer: J. J. Cale

J. J. Cale chronology
Travel-Log (1989)	Number 10 (1992)	Closer to You (1994)

Number 10 is the tenth studio album by American singer-songwriter J. J. Cale, released on November 10, 1992.

== Background and recording ==
Number 10 was Cale's second LP for Silvertone. Compared to his albums in the 70s and 80s, he employs fewer session players for this album, yet still achieves his signature sound. Before releasing 1989's Travel-Log, he went on hiatus, not releasing an album in six years. Notoriously wary of the spotlight, Cale quietly went about his own business his way, and in an era of fuzz guitar and grunge, he delivered his own unique blend of musical styles augmented by his laid-back vocal delivery. In his AllMusic review of the album, Roch Parisien contends:

There are no major surprises on Cale's tenth outing; fans get the same dependable, unassuming, comfy results, like a well-worn but form-fitting pair of slippers. Subtle licks percolate and resonate from the front-porch jam session on "Jailer" and "Low Rider." "Lonesome Train" and "Shady Grove" choogle along, as amiable as they are hypnotic. The closest thing to a twist comes with the phased vocals and spiralling guitar runs of "Digital Blues."

The song “Traces” features Christine Lakeland on synthesizer and foreshadows the synth-heavy material Cale would produce on his next two albums. Cale, who started his career as an engineer in Leon Russell's home studio in the late sixties, told Vintage Guitar in 2004, “I love the engineering part; that’s why I put out a lot of synthesizer-type records – I like that sound. Trouble is, everybody’s doing that now. On the radio, chances are you won’t hear a real drummer. I was doing that all the way back to ‘Call Me The Breeze' and ‘Crazy Mama.’ Those were drum machines.” Most of the songs on Number 10 deal with the joys of love (“Shady Grove,” “Feeling in Love,” “Low Rider”) or the loss of it (“Passion,” “She’s in Love,” “Traces”). The prophetic “Digital Blues” bemoans the loss of individuality in the face of advancing technology, with Cale singing, “I got the digital blues, my soul is just another number,” while the wry “Take Out Some Insurance” addresses the theme of mortality.

== Reception ==
AllMusic stated “it would be easy to imagine Number 10 getting completely buried behind a wash of '90s white noise, but for those prepared to kick off their boots and sit a spell, Cale's latest offers up some seductive rewards.”

== Track listing ==
1. "Lonesome Train" - 3:09
2. "Digital Blues" - 3:33
3. "Feeling In Love" - 3:20
4. "Artificial Paradise" - 4:02
5. "Passion" - 2:25
6. "Take Out Some Insurance" - 2:37
7. "Jailer" - 2:50
8. "Low Rider" - 2:45
9. "Traces" - 3:25
10. "She's In Love" - 3:45
11. "Shady Grove" - 3:54
12. "Roll On Mama" - 2:35

== Personnel ==
- J. J. Cale – vocals, guitars
- Bill Boatman – fiddle (6)
- Spooner Oldham – organ (7)
- Christine Lakeland – Yamaha DX7 (9)
- Nick Rather – bass (6)
- Tim Drummond – bass (7)
- Jimmy Karstein – percussion (11)

Production

- Bernie Grundman – mastering
- Tasmin Pender – design
- Rick Scott – design
- Barry Newman – photography
