= Clyde Stacy =

American singer (1936–2013)

- Born: Haskell Clyde Stacy; August 11, 1936; Eufaula, Oklahoma, U.S.
- Died: November 6, 2013 (aged 77) Muskogee, Oklahoma, U.S.
- Genres: Rockabilly
- Occupations: Singer, guitarist

Haskell Clyde Stacy (August 11, 1936 – November 6, 2013) was an American rockabilly singer and guitarist who recorded in the 1950s as the leader of Clyde Stacy & The Nitecaps. He is credited as a founder of the "Tulsa Sound".

== Biography ==
Stacy was born in Eufaula, Oklahoma, on a farm near Checotah, Oklahoma. He started his education at Jenks before moving with his family to Arizona and then, in 1949, to Lubbock, Texas, where he learned guitar and knew Buddy Holly, one year his senior. In 1954, he moved back to Tulsa, Oklahoma, and soon he formed his own group, The Nitecaps, with lead guitarist John D. LeVan.

Stacy was discovered by radio disc jockey Don Wallace, who became his manager and won a contract for Stacy with the Candlelight record label. In 1957, Stacy's first single, "So Young" backed with "Hoy Hoy", reached no. 68 on the Billboard pop chart, and became even more popular in Canada. "So Young" was banned by some radio stations because of the sexy female voice of Pat Peyton overdubbed onto the record by producer Woody Hinderling. Several of Stacy's later records, including "Baby Shame" (1958), originally recorded by Little Willie Littlefield, and "Honky Tonk Hardwood Floor" (1959), also performed better in Canada than in the US, where his only later chart success came when "So Young" briefly re-entered the national pop chart in 1959.

In 1958 he settled in Scranton, Pennsylvania. He continued to perform and tour, opening shows for Elvis Presley, Patsy Cline and others, and appeared on American Bandstand. He also continued to record occasionally until 1963. In 1975, he returned to live in Oklahoma, running a fence company, and also performed at rock and roll festivals across the US and in Europe, on occasions with old friend Leon Russell.

On November 6, 2013, Stacy was killed in a crash when he drove into the back of a truck near his home in Muskogee, Oklahoma. He was 77.
