= Shades (J. J. Cale album) =

Studio album by J. J. Cale
- Released: February 1981
- Recorded: 1980
- Studios: Capitol (Hollywood, California) (tracks 1,4,7); Columbia (Nashville, Tennessee) (tracks 2,6); The Lakehouse (Nashville, Tennessee) (tracks 3,9); Woodland (Nashville, Tennessee) (track 5); Paradise (Hollywood, California) (track 8); Bradley's Barn (Mount Juliet, Tennessee) (track 9); Crazy Mama (Nashville, Tennessee) (track 10)
- Length: 33:21
- Labels: UK: Island; USA: MCA
- Producers: Audie Ashworth, J. J. Cale

J. J. Cale chronology
5 (1979)	Shades (1981)	Grasshopper (1982)

Shades is the sixth studio album by J. J. Cale, released in February 1981.

== Background ==
After years of living and recording in Nashville, Cale relocated to California in 1980 and lived in an Anaheim trailer park but still worked with longtime producer Audie Ashworth. Shades, which continued Cale’s tradition of giving his albums one word titles, was recorded in various studios in Nashville and Los Angeles. It boasts a large list of top shelf session musicians, including Hal Blaine and Carol Kaye of the Wrecking Crew, James Burton, Jim Keltner, Reggie Young, Glen D. Hardin, Ken Buttrey, and Leon Russell, among many others. As AllMusic states in its retroactive review of the LP, “His songs and his overall approach to music are all-encompassing; the seductive and laid-back grooves his rhythm sections empower are written into the very fabric of the songs. ‘Carry On,’ ‘Pack My Jack’ – these are songs of simple, sturdy strengths, succinctly written and concisely rendered. There are never any stray notes or decorative filigrees.”

== Composition ==
Despite the coterie of musicians used on the sessions, Shades has a remarkably cohesive sound that is immediately recognizable as J.J. Cale. Nine of the ten songs are original compositions, the exception being “Mama Don’t,” which would become Cale’s show opener. As can be seen in the 2005 documentary To Tulsa and Back, Cale would take the stage himself and introduce the band members one by one following along to the words of the song (“Mama don’t allow no bass in this place…”) The album opens with “Carry On,” an optimistic call for perseverance in the face of adversity, followed by the chugging prison song “Deep Dark Dungeon.” The relationship songs have a sour tone, as is evident in “Runaround” and the bitter “What Do You Expect” (“What do you expect, caviar and candlelight? Champagne every night?") "Love Has Been Gone” is also despairing, with Cale repeating the line “There’s nothing new…” Even the straight love song “Wish I Had Not Said That” has an inherent ambivalence in the title, despite the tenderness found in the lyrics.

“Pack My Jack” recalls earlier Cale songs like “Travelin’ Light” and “I’m a Gypsy Man” and speaks to the freedom of the highway and how “a ramblin’ man keeps ramblin’ on.” The album’s closing track, “Cloudy Day” is an instrumental that clocks in at nearly five-and-a-half minutes, making it the longest song to appear on one of Cale’s albums.

Shades' cover features a silhouette of a guitar player, presumably Cale, inspired by the design of French cigarettes brand Gitanes. The notoriously media-shy singer would not use his own image on an LP cover until his 1983 album #8.

== Reception ==
Professional ratings
Review scores
Source	Rating
AllMusic	3/5 stars
The Rolling Stone Album Guide	2/5 stars

AllMusic wrote: “Friendly and inviting, Shades sounds good in any season and at any time of day (and may be some of the best hangover cure music around)."

== Track listing ==
All tracks are written by J. J. Cale, except where noted.

No.	Title	Writer(s)	Length
1.	"Carry On"		2:20
2.	"Deep Dark Dungeon"		2:10
3.	"Wish I Had Not Said That"		3:23
4.	"Pack My Jack"		5:13
5.	"If You Leave Her"		2:42
6.	"Mama Don't"	(Cow Cow Davenport; arranged by Cale)	3:50
7.	"Runaround"		2:42
8.	"What Do You Expect"		3:23
9.	"Love Has Been Gone"		2:13
10.	"Cloudy Day"		5:25

== Personnel ==
- J. J. Cale – gut-string guitar (tr. 3), vocals, rhythm guitar( tr. 1, 2, 6, 10) electric guitar (tr. 1–5, 7–10), drums, arranger, piano (tr. 5), bass (tr. 3), el. guitar solo (second) (tr. 6)
- Christine Lakeland – Moog synthesizer (tr. 3), piano (tr. 3), organ (tr. 1), percussion (tr. 3), vocals, rhythm guitar gut-string guitar (tr. 3), rhythm guitar (tr. 7, 8, 10)
- Tommy Tedesco – rhythm guitar (tr. 1)
- Gordon Shryock – electric guitar (tr. 8)
- Reggie Young – guitar solo (1&3) (tr. 6)
- James Burton – electric guitar (tr. 4)
- Bill Boatman – electric rhythm guitar (tr. 5)
- Johnny Christopher – rhythm guitar (tr. 2, 6)
- Tommy Cogbill – bass (tr. 2, 6, 9)
- Nick Rather – bass (tr. 5, 8, 10)
- Emory Gordy Jr. – bass (tr. 4, 7)
- Carol Kaye – bass (tr. 1)
- Michael Rhodes – bass (tr. 3)
- Jim Keltner – drums (tr. 4)
- Jimmy Karstein drums (tr. 5)
- Gary Allen – drums (tr. 8, 10)
- Hal Blaine – drums (tr. 7)
- Hayward Bishop – drums (tr. 3)
- Kenneth A. Buttrey – drums (tr. 2, 6)
- Karl Himmel – drums (tr. 9)
- Russ Kunkel – drums (tr. 1)
- Larry Bell – electric piano (tr. 5)
- David Briggs – keyboards, piano (tr. 2), electric piano (tr. 6)
- Leon Russell – Electric piano (tr. 8)
- Bill Payne – piano (tr. 7)
- Glen Hardin – piano (tr. 4)
- Bobby Emmons – organ, piano (tr. 6)
- Dennis Solee – saxophone (tr. 10)

Technical

- Vigon Nahas Vigon – art direction, design
- Helmut Werd – photography
- Chad Hailey – engineer
- Les Ladd – engineer
- Audie Ashworth – engineer, producer
- Ron Reynolds – engineer, mixing
- Hugh Davies – engineer, mixing
- Steve Ripley – engineer
- Joe Mills – engineer, mixing

== Miscellaneous ==
The album cover, showing a gypsy guitarist behind cigarette smoke, was the pastiche of a box of Gitanes French cigarettes.
