= Christine Lakeland =

American musician/songwriter (born 1954)

Christine Lakeland (born July 11, 1954) is an American musician and songwriter. She was married to the guitarist/songwriter J. J. Cale until his death in 2013. She played on many of his albums and was a member of his band. She also has recorded several albums under her own name.

== Discography ==
=== Studio albums ===
- 1984 Veranda (Comet Records)
- 1989 Fireworks (Loft Records)
- 1992 Reckoning (LadyFingers Records)
- 1998 Turn To Me (LadyFingers Records)

=== Live album ===
- 2005 Live At Greenwood Ridge (LadyFingers Records)

=== J.J. Cale albums which include Christine Lakeland ===
- 1979 5
- 1981 Shades
- 1982 Grasshopper
- 1983 #8
- 1990 Travel-Log
- 1992 Number 10
- 1994 Closer to You
- 1996 Guitar Man
- 2003 J.J. Cale featuring Leon Russell: In Session at the Paradise Studios (recorded 1979)
- 2004 To Tulsa and Back
- 2006 The Road to Escondido – J.J. Cale and Eric Clapton
- 2007 Rewind: The Unreleased Recordings
- 2009 Roll On
- 2019 Stay Around

=== Other appearances ===
- 1996 Various Artists – More Disaster City Blues: A Collection of Contemporary Blues Songs from Los Angeles / California Vol. 2 (Taxim Records)
- 2014 Eric Clapton & Friends – The Breeze: An Appreciation of JJ Cale (Bushbranch/Surfdog)
