= Stay Around =

Studio album by J. J. Cale
- Released: April 26, 2019
- Genre: Americana, Tulsa sound, blues
- Length: 48:32
- Label: Because Music
- Producer: J. J. Cale

J. J. Cale chronology
Live in San Diego (Eric Clapton album) (2016)	Stay Around (2019)

J. J. Cale studio albums chronology
Roll On (2009)	Stay Around (2019)

Singles from Stay Around
- 1. "Chasing You" Released: January 31, 2019 (YouTube); 2. "Stay Around" Released: March 20, 2019 (YouTube); April 13, 2019 (RSD) (7" single); 3. "Go Downtown" Released: May 7, 2019 (YouTube); 4. "If We Try" Released: July 9, 2019 (YouTube); 5. "Long About Sundown" Released: July 9, 2019 (YouTube); 6. "Winter Snow" Released: July 9, 2019 (YouTube); 7. "Maria" Released: July 9, 2019 (YouTube); 8. "Tell Daddy" Released: July 9, 2019 (YouTube); 9. "Wish You Were Here" Released: July 9, 2019 (YouTube)

Professional ratings
Review scores
Source	Rating
AllMusic	4/5 stars
Under the Radar	8/10
The Line of Best Fit	8/10
The Irish Times	4/5 stars

Stay Around is the 15th and final studio album by songwriter, guitarist and singer J. J. Cale, and his first and only posthumous album so far, released on April 26, 2019, by Because Music.

== Overview ==
Stay Around is a collection of 15 previously unreleased Cale songs, all mixed and produced by J. J. Cale himself and compiled by those closest to him, Cale's widow Christine Lakeland Cale and his longtime friend and manager Mike Kappus. This is his first release of original material in a decade. In a statement, Lakeland spoke about how she compiled Stay Around, saying, "I wanted to find stuff that was completely unheard to max-out the ‘Cale factor’… using as much that came from John's ears and fingers and his choices as I could, so I stuck to John's mixes. You can make things so sterile that you take the human feel out. But John left a lot of that human feel in. He left so much room for interpretation."

== Release ==
Stay Around was released on multiple formats (digital, CD & limited collector vinyl) on April 26, 2019, by Because Music.

== Singles ==
"Chasing You", the first single from the album, was digitally released on January 31, 2019. It came with a music video (2:58) released via YouTube with footage of Cale touring and performing live taken from the 2005 documentary To Tulsa and Back – On Tour with J. J. Cale.

The title track was digitally released on March 20, 2019, as the second single from the album. It came with a music video (3:05) released via YouTube. This single was released on vinyl (on Because Music label) on April 13, 2019 (at the occasion of Record Store Day), backed with "Worrying Off Your Mind", a (then) digital-only bonus track from J.J. Cale's previous studio album Roll On (2009).

"Go Downtown" was digitally released on May 7, 2019. It came with a music video (3:33) released via YouTube.

== About the tracks ==
- "Chasing You" is a simmering blues rocker anchored by Cale's plucky guitar and tender vocals as he sings, "Walking down through the past/We thought it would always last/Things have changed somehow/It's all behind us now/Don't know why I do/I'm still chasing you," according to Rolling Stone magazine.

== Track listing ==
All songs written by J. J. Cale except "My Baby Blues" written by Cale's wife Christine Lakeland, the first song she and Cale recorded in 1977 as part of a four-piece combo.

1. "Lights Down Low" – 2:20
2. "Chasing You" – 4:26
3. "Winter Snow" – 3:25
4. "Stay Around" – 4:42
5. "Tell You 'Bout Her" – 3:45
6. "Oh My My" – 1:51
7. "My Baby Blues" – 3:04
8. "Girl of Mine" – 3:02
9. "Go Downtown" – 3:32
10. "If We Try" – 2:49
11. "Tell Daddy" – 3:24
12. "Wish You Were Here" – 2:45
13. "Long About Sundown" – 2:48
14. "Maria" – 3:38
15. "Don't Call Me Joe" – 3:01

== Personnel ==
=== Musicians ===
- J. J. Cale – vocals

=== Production ===
- J. J. Cale – executive producer

== Charts ==
Chart (2019)	Peak position
Australian Digital Albums (ARIA)	44
Austrian Albums (Ö3 Austria)	15
Belgian Albums (Ultratop Flanders)	14
Belgian Albums (Ultratop Wallonia)	18
Dutch Albums (Album Top 100)	27
French Albums (SNEP)	26
German Albums (Offizielle Top 100)	9
Italian Albums (FIMI)	68
Portuguese Albums (AFP)	31
Scottish Albums (OCC)	27
Spanish Albums (PROMUSICAE)	33
Swiss Albums (Schweizer Hitparade)	3
