= Travel-Log =

Studio album by J. J. Cale
- Released: November 6, 1989
- Studios: Capitol (Hollywood, California); Sound City (Van Nuys, California); The Complex (Los Angeles, California)
- Length: 42:06
- Label: Silvertone/BMG
- Producer: J. J. Cale

J. J. Cale chronology
#8 (1983)	Travel-Log (1989)	Number 10 (1992)

Professional ratings
Review scores
Source	Rating
AllMusic	4/5 stars
Q	4/5 stars

Travel-Log is the ninth studio album by J. J. Cale. It was released on November 6, 1989, through Silvertone Records.

== Background ==
Cale initially made his reputation in the 1970s as a songwriter for Eric Clapton and Lynyrd Skynyrd. Cale's recording career came to a halt in the mid-1980s. Although he produced a handful of minor hits, Cale was indifferent to publicity and preferred to avoid the spotlight. As a result, his albums never sold well. However, his 1983 Mercury release #8 was the first album of his career not to chart, and he became disillusioned with the music business, taking six years off. In 1990 he explained in an interview, "In 1984 I was with a different record company, and it didn't seem to be working out too good, so I asked to get out of my contract, and that took a couple of years to shuffle the paper around. Then when I got through doin' that, I thought I'd take a little break from recording; maybe go in once or twice a year and record somethin' I'd written."

== Recording ==
Travel-Log was the first solo album Cale produced himself, without long-time producer Audie Ashworth. Audie co-wrote the opening track "Shanghaid" with Cale. While the album has a travel theme with titles like "Tijuana" and "New Orleans", Cale insisted he did not set out to make a concept album and only recognized it after he picked the songs:

It's kind of ironic. When Andrew Lauder of Silvertone said he'd like to put out some tapes, I just got a bunch together and they put 'em out as an album. It wasn't till I got to listening to the album that I noticed that I'd written a bunch of tunes in the last four or five years about towns, and places, and travellin' around.

Cale had continued recording at his home studio and other studios, and explained that Travel-Log was "a gathering of all those things." He drafted many of the same session musicians who worked on his previous recordings, such as drummer Jim Keltner and keyboardist Spooner Oldham, and also enlisted guitarist James Burton and folk veteran (and fellow Okie) Hoyt Axton, who sings on "Lean on Me." Cale's wife, singer and guitarist Christine Lakeland, appears on the album. Travel-Log contains the bluesy, shuffling rock and roll fans would expected, although songs like "Hold On Baby" and "No Time" are harder-edged, with AllMusic's William Ruhlmann noting in his review, "Cale's first album in six years finds him taking a more aggressive stance in terms of tempos and playing, although he remains a man with a profound sense of the groove and, especially as a singer, a minimalist." The mysterious and spooky "Tijuana" tells the story of the "land of broken dreams" where women with flashing dark eyes ask "Can you take us over the border, just tell them I'm your daughter." "End of the Line" has a jazzy, cocktail lounge after-hours vibe that recalls earlier Cale songs, "Call the Doctor" and "You've Got Me on So Bad." The track "Disadvantage," which is credited to Cale and four of the session players, sounds like the product of a studio jam, while "Riverboat Song" is an intimate acoustic blues featuring Cale's trademark multi-tracked vocals.

== Track listing ==
All tracks written by J. J. Cale, unless otherwise noted.

1. "Shanghaid" - 2:37 (Audie Ashworth, J. J. Cale)
2. "Hold On Baby" - 3:02
3. "No Time" - 3:13
4. "Lady Luck" - 2:41
5. "Disadvantage" - 3:35 (J. J. Cale, Drummond, Karstein, Lakeland, Oldham)
6. "Lean on Me" - 3:19
7. "End of the Line" - 3:09
8. "New Orleans" - 2:33
9. "Tijuana" - 3:54
10. "That Kind of Thing" - 2:18
11. "Who's Talking" - 3:27 (J. J. Cale, Drummond, Roger Tarczon)
12. "Change Your Mind" - 2:26
13. "Humdinger" - 3:24
14. "River Boat Song" - 3:07

== Personnel ==
- J. J. Cale – vocals, guitars, bass
- Spooner Oldham – keyboards
- Christine Lakeland – organ, guitars, backing vocals
- Jim Keltner – organ, drums, percussion
- James Burton – guitar (6)
- Doug Belli – bass
- Tim Drummond – bass
- Jimmy Karstein – drums, percussion
- Jay Mitthauer – drums
- Al Capps – orchestrations, arrangements
- The Al Capps Orchestra – orchestra
- Hoyt Axton – backing vocals (6)

=== Production ===
- J. J. Cale – producer, engineer
- Brett Newman – engineer
- Charlie Paakkari – engineer
- Duane Seykora – engineer
- Philip Lloyd-Smee – design, sleeve illustration

== Charts ==
Chart (1989–1990)	Peak position
Dutch Albums (Album Top 100)	76
Swedish Albums (Sverigetopplistan)	50
Swiss Albums (Schweizer Hitparade)	29
US Billboard 200	131
