= Grasshopper (album) =

Studio album by J. J. Cale
- Released: March 1982
- Studios: Chip Youngs Log Cabin, Murfreesboro, TN; Columbia Recording Studio, Nashville, TN; Crazy Mamas Studio, Nashville, TN
- Length: 34:53
- Labels: UK: Island; USA: Mercury
- Producers: Audie Ashworth, J. J. Cale

J. J. Cale chronology
Shades (1981)	Grasshopper (1982)	#8 (1983)

Singles from Grasshopper
- 1. "City Girls" Released: 1982; 2. "Devil In Disguise" Released: 1982

Grasshopper is the seventh studio album by J. J. Cale, released in March 1982. It was his first with Mercury Records.

== Background and recording ==
In 2013, he reflected, "…I knew what fame entailed. I tried to back off from that. I had seen some of the people I was working with forced to be careful because people wouldn’t leave them alone…What I’m saying, basically, is I was trying to get the fortune without having the fame."

Band member and wife Christine Lakeland co-wrote the bluesy dirge "Does Your Mama Like to Reggae" as well as "Don’t Wait."

== Release and reception ==
Grasshopper was released in March 1982 by Mercury Records in the US, and Island Records in the UK. The tracks "City Girls" and "Devil In Disguise" were released as singles.

Professional ratings
Review scores
Source	Rating
Billboard	(unrated)
Cash Box	(unrated)
Rolling Stone	3/5 stars

In his AllMusic review of the LP, William Ruhlmann notes, "J.J. Cale drifts toward a more pop approach on this album, starting with the lead-off track, ‘City Girls,’ which could almost but not quite be a hit single. The usual blues and country shuffle approach is in effect, but Audie Ashworth's production is unusually sharp, the playing has more bite than usual, and Cale, whose vocals are for the most part up in the mix, sounds more engaged."

== Track listing ==
All tracks are written by J. J. Cale, except where noted.

Side One
No.	Title	Writer(s)	Length
1.	"City Girls"		2:49
2.	"Devil in Disguise"		2:03
3.	"One Step Ahead of the Blues"	Roger Tillison	2:25
4.	"You Keep Me Hangin' On"		3:30
5.	"Downtown L.A."		2:32
6.	"Can't Live Here"		2:15
7.	"Grasshopper"		1:45

Side Two
No.	Title	Writer(s)	Length
8.	"Drifters Wife"		1:42
9.	"Don't Wait"	Cale, Christine Lakeland	3:12
10.	"A Thing Going On"		2:42
11.	"Nobody But You"		3:05
12.	"Mississippi River"		2:06
13.	"Does Your Mama Like to Reggae"	Cale, Lakeland	3:45
14.	"Dr. Jive"		1:57

== Personnel ==
- J. J. Cale – vocals ( tr. 1–6, 8–13), electric guitar (tr. 1–7, 9–14), slide guitar (tr. 1), bass guitar (tr. 2), gut-string guitar (tr. 5), guitar (tr. 8), organ (tr. 12), engineer (tr. 8), mixing (tr. 2, 7, 8, 12, 14), producer
- Reggie Young – electric guitar (tr. 1, 4) rhythm guitar (tr. 14)
- Christine Lakeland – electric guitar (tr. 5, 11), organ (tr. 5, 10), backing vocals (tr. 2, 8, 13), guitar (tr. 10), rhythm guitar (tr. 12), percussion (tr. 12, 13)
- David Briggs – piano (tr. 3, 4, 6, 13), electric piano (tr. 1)
- Mike Lawler – synthesizer (tr. 3, 13)
- Jim Karstein – congas (tr. 5)
- Bill Boatman – tambourine (tr. 5), drums (tr. 2, 5, 10, 12)
- Terry McMillan – harmonica (tr. 9)
- Robert Greenidge – steel drums (tr. 7)
- Gary Allen – drums (tr. 11)
- Charles Dungey – bass guitar (tr. 14)
- Farrell Morris – congas, vibraphone (tr. 14)
- Karl Himmel – drums (tr. 7, 14)
- Nick Rather – bass guitar (tr. 5, 10, 11, 12)
- Tommy Cogbill – bass guitar (tr. 1, 3, 6, 7, 13)
- Ken Buttrey – drums (tr. 1, 3, 4, 6, 13)
- Steve Gibson – electric guitar (tr. 3, 6, 13)
- Johnny Christopher – rhythm guitar (tr. 1, 3, 4, 6, 13)
- Bobby Emmons – organ (tr. 1, 3, 4, 6, 13)
- Bob Moore – bass (tr. 9)
- Buddy Harman – drums (tr. 9)
- Harold Bradley – electric guitar (tr. 9)
- Tony Migliori – piano (tr. 9)
- Ray Edenton – rhythm guitar (tr. 9)
- Marilyn Davis – backing vocals (tr. 13)
- Dennis Solee – horns (tr. 11)

Technical

- Audie Ashworth – engineer (tr. 7), producer
- Chad Hailey – engineer (tr. 2, 5, 11, 12), mixer (tr. 5, 6, 11, 12)
- Chip Young – engineer (tr. 14)
- Rick Horton – engineer (tr. 3)
- Ron Reynolds – engineer (tr. 1, 4, 6, 9, 13), mixer (tr. 1, 3, 4, 9, 13)
