= The Road to Escondido =

Studio album by JJ Cale and Eric Clapton
- Released: 7 November 2006
- Recorded: August 2005
- Studios: Los Angeles, California
- Genres: Blues, blues rock, Tulsa sound
- Length: 57:05
- Label: Duck / Reprise
- Producers: JJ Cale; Eric Clapton; Simon Climie

JJ Cale chronology
| To Tulsa and Back (2004) | The Road to Escondido (2006) | Rewind: The Unreleased Recordings (2007) |

Eric Clapton chronology
| Back Home (2005) | The Road to Escondido (2006) | Complete Clapton (2007) |

Professional ratings
Review scores
| Source | Rating |
|---|---|
| All About Jazz | 3/5 stars |
| AllMusic | 4/5 stars |
| Classic Rock | 7/10 stars |
| Contactmusic | 2.5/5 stars |
| Glide Magazine | 5/11 stars |
| The Music Box | 4/5 stars |
| Paste | (favourable) |
| Slant Magazine | 3.5/5 stars |
| Twisted Ear | 2.5/5 stars |

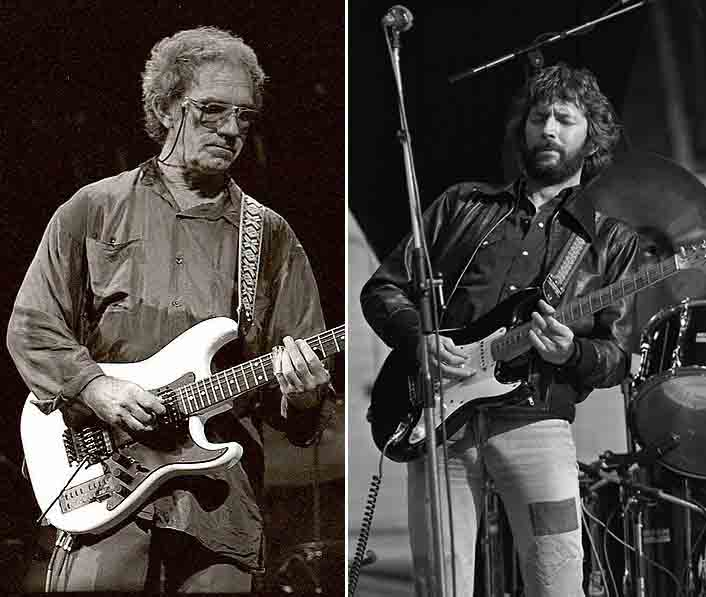
J. J. Cale and Eric Clapton.

The Road to Escondido is a collaborative studio album by JJ Cale and Eric Clapton. It was released on 7 November 2006. Contained on this album are the final recordings of keyboardist Billy Preston. The album is jointly dedicated to Preston and Brian Roylance, who died in 2006 and 2005, respectively.

In 2004, Eric Clapton held the Crossroads Guitar Festival, a three-day festival in Dallas, Texas. Among the performers was J. J. Cale, giving Clapton the opportunity to ask Cale to produce an album for him. The two started working together and eventually decided to record an album. A number of high-profile musicians also agreed to work on the album, including Albert Lee, Billy Preston, Derek Trucks, Taj Mahal, Pino Palladino, John Mayer, Steve Jordan, and Doyle Bramhall II. In a coup, whether intended or not, the entire John Mayer Trio participated on this album in one capacity or another.

Escondido is a city in San Diego County near Cale's home at the time located in the small, unincorporated town of Valley Center, California. Eric Clapton owned a mansion in Escondido in the 1980s and early '90s. The road referenced in the album's title is named Valley Center Road. It runs from Valley Center to Escondido. Cale and Clapton thought it would be a good name for the album because it connected the two locales.

The album won the Grammy Award for Best Contemporary Blues Album in 2008.

== Background ==
Cale first came into Clapton's orbit in the late sixties when he heard Cale's obscure 1966 Liberty single "Slow Motion", which featured "After Midnight" as the B-side. Clapton copied the arrangement of "After Midnight" and scored a radio hit with it in 1970. Cale, who worked for a time as an engineer in Leon Russell's home studio in Los Angeles for a few years, was barely making ends meet in Tulsa when the song became a hit. Cale recalled to Mojo magazine that when he heard Clapton's version playing on his radio, "I was dirt poor, not making enough to eat and I wasn't a young man. I was in my thirties, so I was very happy. It was nice to make some money." Clapton then recorded other Cale songs, such as the 1977 hit "Cocaine", and the songwriting royalties earned from artists like Clapton covering his songs enabled Cale to have a comfortable, if not commercially successful, recording career. In a 2014 interview with NPR, Clapton spoke about Cale's influence on his music:

What seemed to evolve out of the '60s and into the '70s and then, in another way, the '80s – heavy metal came out of all of this stuff – was, like, volume and proficiency and virtuosity. There didn't seem to be any reasonable limit to that; it was just crazy. I wanted to go in the other direction and try to find a way to make it minimal, but still have a great deal of substance. That was the essence of J.J.'s music to me, apart from the fact that he summed up so many of the different essences of American music: rock and jazz and folk, blues. He just seemed to have an understanding of it all.

Clapton, who toured with Delaney & Bonnie in 1969, recalled in the 2005 documentary To Tulsa and Back, "Delaney Bramlett is the one that was responsible to get me singing. He was the one who turned me on to the Tulsa community. Bramlett produced my first solo album and "After Midnight" was on it, and those [Tulsa] players played on it. I mean, the first part of my solo career was really tailored on Cale's philosophy. I mean, 461 Ocean Boulevard was my kind of homage to J.J."

Despite their association in the public's mind, the pair had rarely socialized or played together over the years, but in 2004 Clapton invited Cale to perform at his Crossroads Festival in Dallas. Cale, who was coming off an eight-year hiatus with the release of To Tulsa and Back, accepted, and it was during this period that Clapton asked him to produce his next album, which blossomed into a full-fledged collaboration.

== Recording ==
Cale wrote 11 of the 14 tracks on the album, with two cuts, "Any Way the Wind Blows" and "Don't Cry Sister", being re-recordings of songs that Cale recorded previously in the seventies. Vocally, the pair's singing styles are so symbiotic on the album that they are nearly indistinguishable, with Stephen Thomas Erlewine observing in his AllMusic review that the LP "reveals exactly how much Clapton learned from Cale's singing; their timbre and phrasing is nearly identical, to the point that it's frequently hard to discern who is singing when. Disconcerting this may be, but it's hardly bad, since it never feels like Clapton is copying Cale; instead, it shows their connection, that they're kindred spirits." Musically the tone is relaxed and casual, a mix of bluesy grooves and up-tempo boogies that play to the duo's strengths. The fiddle-driven "Dead End Road", the galloping "Any Way the Wind Blows", and the optimistic "Ride the River" exude the general vibe of camaraderie that permeates the recordings, while Clapton's "Three Little Girls" speaks to the bliss of domestic life. The Brownie McGhee cover "The Sporting Life" and the seen-it-all minor blues "Hard to Thrill" (composed by Clapton and John Mayer) display the pair's tasteful guitar licks and vocals.

== Reception ==
AllMusic: "It's relaxed and casual in the best possible sense: it doesn't sound lazy, it sounds lived-in, even with [Simon] Climie's too-clean production, and that vibe – coupled with Cale's sturdy songs – makes this an understated winner." David Fricke of Rolling Stone wrote the LP "has the natural glow and nimble jump of a house-party jam."

== Track listing ==
All songs by J. J. Cale except where noted.

| No. | Title | Writer(s) | Length |
|---|---|---|---|
| 1. | "Danger" | | 5:32 |
| 2. | "Heads In Georgia" | | 4:09 |
| 3. | "Missing Person" | | 4:27 |
| 4. | "When This War Is Over" | | 3:48 |
| 5. | "Sporting Life Blues" | Brownie McGhee | 3:31 |
| 6. | "Dead End Road" | | 3:27 |
| 7. | "It's Easy" | | 4:17 |
| 8. | "Hard To Thrill" | Eric Clapton, John Mayer | 5:10 |
| 9. | "Anyway The Wind Blows" | | 3:54 |
| 10. | "Three Little Girls" | Clapton | 2:44 |
| 11. | "Don't Cry Sister" | | 3:08 |
| 12. | "Last Will And Testament" | | 3:57 |
| 13. | "Who Am I Telling You?" | | 4:07 |
| 14. | "Ride The River" | | 4:34 |

== Personnel ==
=== Musicians ===
- J. J. Cale – vocals, keyboards, guitars
- Eric Clapton – vocals, guitars
- Billy Preston – Fender Rhodes, Wurlitzer electric piano, Hammond organ
- Walt Richmond – acoustic piano, Fender Rhodes, Wurlitzer electric piano
- Doyle Bramhall II – guitars
- Christine Lakeland – acoustic guitar, backing vocals
- Albert Lee – guitars
- John Mayer – guitars
- Derek Trucks – guitars
- Nathan East – bass
- Gary Gilmore – bass
- Pino Palladino – bass
- Willie Weeks – bass
- James Cruce – drums, percussion
- Steve Jordan – drums
- Jim Karstein – drums, percussion
- Abe Laboriel Jr. – drums
- Simon Climie – percussion, programming
- David Teegarden – percussion
- Taj Mahal – harmonica
- Dennis Caplinger – fiddle
- Marty Grebb – horns
- Jerry Peterson – horns
- Bruce Fowler – horns
- Steve Madaio – horns

=== Production ===
- Eric Clapton – producer, album cover concept
- J. J. Cale – producer, mixing
- Simon Climie – co-producer, Pro Tools engineer
- Alan Douglas – recording, mixing
- Jimmy Hoyson – assistant engineer
- Phillippe Rose – assistant engineer
- Brian Vibberts – assistant engineer
- Mick Guzauski – mixing
- Tom Bender – mix assistant
- Joel Evenden – Pro Tools assistant
- Bob Ludwig – mastering at Gateway Mastering (Portland, ME)
- Bushbranch – management for Eric Clapton
- Mike Kappus – management for J. J. Cale
- Lee Dickson – guitar technician
- Debbie Johnson – studio coordinator (Los Angeles)
- Catherine Roylance – art direction, design
- David McClister – location photography
- Nathan East – additional studio photography
- Christine Lakeland – additional studio photography
- Jim Karstein – additional studio photography
- Nigel Carroll – personal assistant to Eric Clapton, additional studio photography

== Chart performance ==
=== Weekly charts ===
| Chart (2006–2012) | Peak position |
|---|---|
| Australian Albums (ARIA) | 43 |
| Austrian Albums (Ö3 Austria) | 3 |
| Belgian Albums (Ultratop Flanders) | 15 |
| Belgian Albums (Ultratop Wallonia) | 12 |
| Danish Albums (Hitlisten) | 8 |
| Dutch Albums (Album Top 100) | 5 |
| Finnish Albums (Suomen virallinen lista) | 14 |
| French Albums (SNEP) | 10 |
| German Albums (Offizielle Top 100) | 2 |
| Greek Albums (IFPI) | 8 |
| Hungarian Albums (MAHASZ) | 36 |
| Irish Albums (IRMA) | 77 |
| Italian Albums (FIMI) | 7 |
| Japanese Albums (Oricon) | 8 |
| New Zealand Albums (RMNZ) | 1 |
| Norwegian Albums (VG-lista) | 3 |
| Polish Albums (ZPAV) | 24 |
| Scottish Albums (Official Charts) | 47 |
| Spanish Albums (Promusicae) | 25 |
| Swedish Albums (Sverigetopplistan) | 4 |
| Swiss Albums (Schweizer Hitparade) | 7 |
| UK Albums (Official Charts) | 50 |
| UK Download Albums (OCC) | 30 |
| UK Physical Albums (OCC) | 51 |
| US Billboard 200 | 23 |
| US Digital Albums (Billboard) | 29 |
| US Top Internet Albums (Billboard) | 23 |
| US Top Rock Albums (Billboard) | 7 |
| US Indie Store Album Sales (Billboard) | 1 |

=== Year-end charts ===
| Chart (2006) | Position |
|---|---|
| Austrian Albums (Ö3 Austria) | 113 |
| Dutch Albums (MegaCharts) | 46 |
| German Albums (Offizielle Top 100) | 119 |
| Norwegian Albums (VG-lista) | 67 |
| Swedish Albums (Sverigetopplistan) | 93 |
| Swiss Albums (Schweizer Hitparade) | 136 |

| Chart (2007) | Position |
|---|---|
| Dutch Albums (MegaCharts) | 64 |
| German Albums (Offizielle Top 100) | 125 |
| New Zealand Albums (RMNZ) | 39 |
| Swiss Albums (Schweizer Hitparade) | 166 |
| US Billboard 200 | 121 |

== Certifications ==
Sales certifications for The Road to Escondido
| Region | Certification | Certified units/sales |
|---|---|---|
| Austria (IFPI Austria) | Gold | 15,000^{*} |
| Denmark (IFPI Danmark) | Platinum | 40,000^{^} |
| Germany (BVMI) | Platinum | 200,000^{^} |
| Japan | — | 47,000 |
| Netherlands (NVPI) | Gold | 35,000^{^} |
| New Zealand (RMNZ) | Platinum | 15,000^{^} |
| Switzerland (IFPI Switzerland) | Gold | 15,000^{^} |
| United Kingdom (BPI) | Silver | 60,000^{^} |
| United States (RIAA) | Gold | 500,000^{^} |
^{*} Sales figures based on certification alone.^{^} Shipments figures based on certification alone.
