= Tulsa sound =

Musical style of Tulsa, Oklahoma

- Stylistic origins: Blues; country; rock and roll; rockabilly
- Cultural origins: 1950s
- Derivative forms: Red Dirt, Southern rock

The Tulsa sound is a popular musical style that originated in Tulsa, Oklahoma, during the second half of the twentieth century. It is a mix of blues, blues rock, country, rock and roll and swamp pop sounds of the late 1950s and early 1960s. Artists considered to have pioneered the Tulsa sound include J. J. Cale, Leon Russell, Roger Tillison and Elvin Bishop. After 1980, Gus Hardin (country), and Jeff Carson (country) released roots music albums.

Not all musicians associated with the city of Tulsa perform in the Tulsa sound: Dwight Twilley is from Tulsa, but his power pop style bears no resemblance to the Tulsa sound. Likewise David Gates' most recognized songs (including his work with Bread) were mostly in the soft rock genre (though some of Gates' solo album cuts show a stronger Tulsa influence).

== History ==
The first appearance of note by a Tulsa sound musician was Rocky Frisco's Columbia Harmony vinyl album, The Big Ten, under the name "Rocky Curtiss and the Harmony Flames". The album was recorded in New York City at Columbia's studio at 33rd Street and 3rd Avenue in 1959, during a time when Frisco lived in Pennsylvania. Rockabilly musician Clyde Stacy was one of the first, if not the first, Tulsa sound musicians to score a nationally charted record, "Hoy Hoy" b/w "So Young", backed by his band the NiteCaps. This was a double-sided hit released by Candlelight Records in 1957. Members of the NiteCaps during that period were guitarist John D. Levan and others. Levan was inducted into the Rockabilly Hall of Fame in August 2004 along with Tulsa Radio Personality "Rockin" John Henry.

Marvin & Johnny recorded "Cherry Pie" in 1954. In 1958, another Tulsan, Billy Reynolds Eustise, and the Tri-Lads scored a hit with "Cherry Pie". Rocky Frisco published blues musician Flash Terry's photo on his website.

J. J. Cale's "After Midnight" was covered by Eric Clapton. Leon Russell was the first member of the Tulsa scene to make inroads into the Los Angeles music scene, playing for Ricky Nelson along with James Burton. He then joined Phil Spector's Wrecking Crew and then produced Gary Lewis and Jan & Dean. He joined Joe Cocker's Mad dogs and Englishmen. Russell performed "Jumpin' Jack Flash/Young Blood" at Bangladesh concert. Leon Russell wrote "Super Star" and "A Song for You", which The Carpenters covered. Russell recorded his "Carney" album, and had a hit with "Tight Rope" in 1972. He brought many Tulsans out to Los Angeles, including Carl Radle and Larry Bell, and was later co-owner of the historic The Church Studio in Tulsa and home to Shelter Records, which signed a number of significant Tulsa sound artists including Tom Petty and the Heartbreakers. The Church Studio was purchased in 2016 by husband and wife Ivan Acosta and Teresa Knox, who have said they intend to renovate the building, seek registration on the National Register of Historic Places, and use it as a recording studio and community facility. Elvin Bishop gained hit "Fooled Around and Fell in Love" in 1976. Jesse Ed Davis and Jim Keltner were from Oklahoma State. The Tractors released first album "The Tractors" in 1994.

== Influence ==
Eric Clapton was the most prominent non-Tulsa-based artist who was still associated with its style. For 10 years, his band consisted of Tulsans Carl Radle (bass), Dick Sims (organ), and Jamie Oldaker (drums). During that time Clapton was a frequent performer at a variety of venues in the Tulsa area. In his review of Clapton's 1978 album Backless, critic Robert Christgau wrote, "Whatever Eric isn't anymore . . . he's certainly king of the Tulsa sound."

In addition to Clapton, J.J. Cale's influence has been cited by Mark Knopfler, among others. His songs have been recorded by many artists, including Clapton, Lynyrd Skynyrd, Deep Purple, the Allman Brothers Band, Johnny Cash, John Mayer, The Band, Kansas, Santana, Captain Beefheart, Widespread Panic, and Bryan Ferry. The songs of Tulsan Elvin Bishop have often been covered by other artists, including Starship. Taj Mahal had two Tulsans in his band: Chuck Blackwell and Gary Gillmore, and one Oklahoma City native, Jesse Ed Davis.

Music journalist John Wooley and others have noted that the Tulsa sound has directly and indirectly contributed to various other genres of music, including genres outside rock music, such as alt-country and Red Dirt music, the latter of which also originated in Oklahoma (Red Dirt originated in Stillwater). Leon Russell noted: "I'm not sure what the Tulsa sound is, I suppose it started when we were with Jerry Lee Lewis, we would be playing a shuffle while Jerry Lee played straight eighth notes, if that is what they call the Tulsa sound, that's not a bad thing".

== See also ==
- Country rock
- Roots music
- Cross Canadian Ragweed
- Turnpike Troubadours
- Cody Canada and The Departed
