= List of awards and nominations received by Cloris Leachman =

List of Cloris Leachman awards
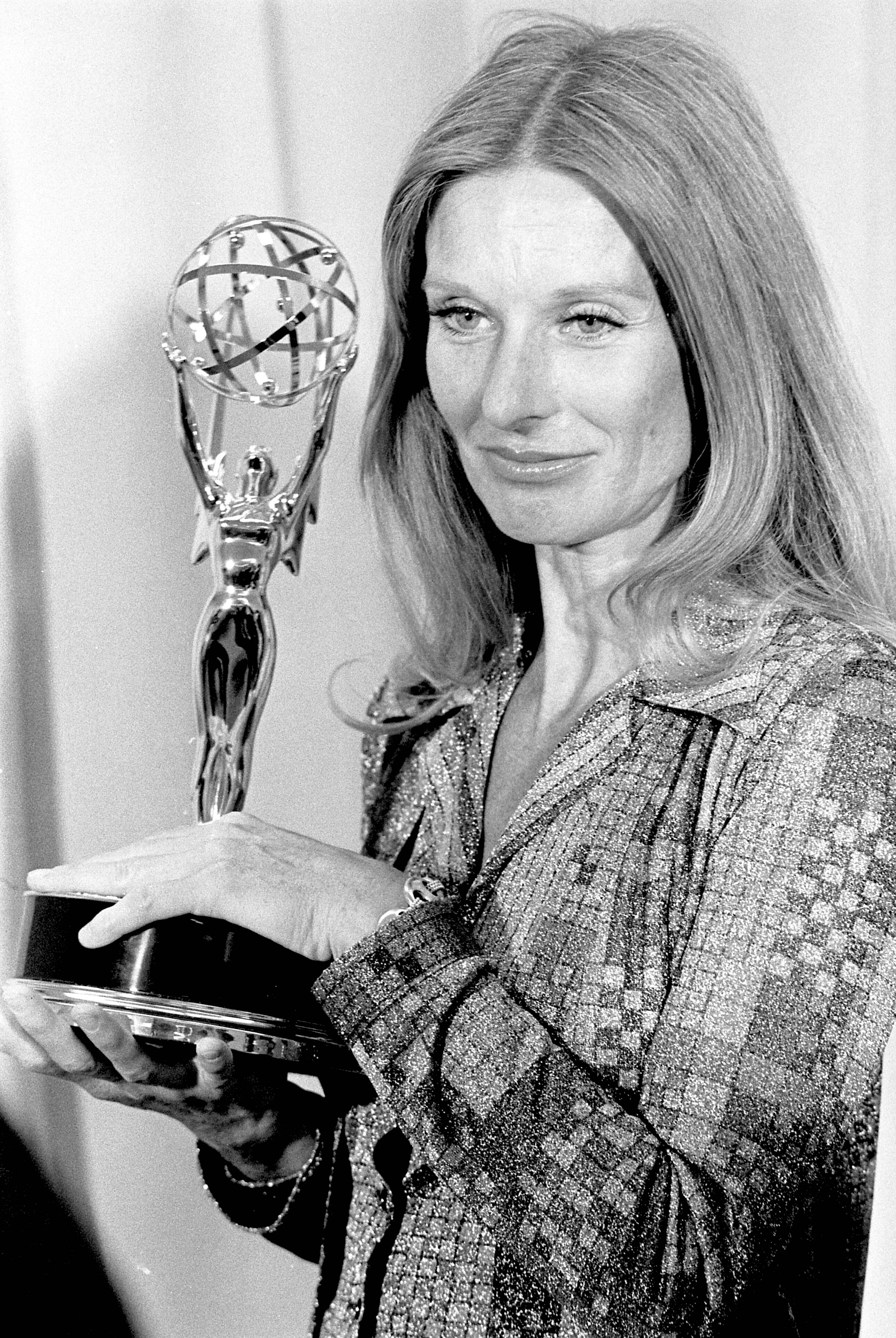
- Leachman at the 25th Primetime Emmy Awards in 1973
Awards and nominations
Award	Wins	Nominations
Academy Awards	1	1
Actor Awards	0	2
British Academy Film Awards	1	1
Emmy Awards	9	23
Golden Globes	1	4

Totals (Note: Certain award groups do not simply award one winner. They acknowledge several different recipients, have runners-up, and have third place. Since this is a specific recognition and is different from losing an award, runner-up mentions are considered wins in this award tally. For simplification and to avoid errors, each award in this list has been presumed to have had a prior nomination.)
- Wins: 24
- Nominations: 53

Cloris Leachman was an American actress and comedian who received numerous accolades throughout her career. She won eight Primetime Emmy Awards from 22 nominations, making her the most nominated and, along with Julia Louis-Dreyfus, Jean Smart, and Allison Janney, most awarded performer in Emmy history. She was also the recipient of an Academy Award, a British Academy Film Award, a Daytime Emmy Award, and a Golden Globe Award. In 2011, she was inducted in the Television Hall of Fame.

After studying at the Actors Studio, she appeared in Peter Bogdanovich's drama film The Last Picture Show (1971), for which she won the Academy Award for Best Supporting Actress and the BAFTA Award for Best Actress in a Supporting Role. She also received two nominations for the Golden Globe Award for Best Actress for the comedy films Charley and the Angel (1973) and Mel Brooks' Young Frankenstein (1974), and a SAG-AFTRA's Actor Award nomination for Outstanding Female Actor in a Supporting Role for the romantic comedy Spanglish (2004).

From 1970 to 1975, Leachman starred in The Mary Tyler Moore Show as Phyllis Lindstrom, Mary Richards' snobbish, self-absorbed and interfering friend and downstairs neighbor. The role earned her two Primetime Emmy Awards for both Outstanding Supporting Actress and Outstanding Guest Actress in a Comedy Series. In 1975, Leachman left the show to star in the spin-off series Phyllis (1975–1977), which won her the Golden Globe Award for Best Actress in a Television Series – Musical or Comedy. Her other Emmy Award–winning work includes the television film A Brand New Life (1973), special appearances in the variety sketch show Cher (1975), the ABC Afterschool Special production The Woman Who Willed a Miracle (1983), the drama series Promised Land (1998), and a recurring role as Ida in Malcolm in the Middle (2000–2006).

== Major associations ==
=== Academy Awards ===
Year	Category	Nominated work	Result	Ref.
Academy Awards
1972	Best Supporting Actress	The Last Picture Show	Won	

=== BAFTA Awards ===
Year	Category	Nominated work	Result	Ref.
British Academy Film Awards
1973	Best Actress in a Supporting Role	The Last Picture Show	Won	

=== Emmy Awards ===
Year	Category	Nominated work	Result	Ref.
Primetime Emmy Awards
1972	Outstanding Performance by an Actress in a Supporting Role in Comedy	The Mary Tyler Moore Show	Nominated	
1973	Outstanding Performance by an Actress in a Supporting Role in Comedy	The Mary Tyler Moore Show	Nominated	
1973	Outstanding Single Performance by an Actress in a Leading Role	A Brand New Life	Won	
1974	Outstanding Lead Actress in a Drama	The Migrants	Nominated	
1974	Outstanding Supporting Actress in Comedy	The Mary Tyler Moore Show	Won	
1975	Outstanding Single Performance by a Supporting Actress in a Comedy or Drama Series	The Mary Tyler Moore Show	Won	
1975	Outstanding Continuing or Single Performance by a Supporting Actress in Variety or Music	Cher	Won	
1976	Outstanding Continuing or Single Performance by a Supporting Actress in Variety or Music	Telly... Who Loves Ya Baby?	Nominated	
1976	Outstanding Lead Actress in a Comedy Series	Phyllis	Nominated	
1978	Outstanding Performance by a Supporting Actress in a Drama or Comedy Special	It Happened One Christmas	Nominated	
1984	Outstanding Supporting Actress in a Limited Series or a Special	Ernie Kovacs: Between the Laughter	Nominated	
1984	Outstanding Individual Performance in a Variety or Music Program	Screen Actors Guild 50th Anniversary Celebration	Won	
1998	Outstanding Guest Actress in a Drama Series	Promised Land	Won	
2001	Outstanding Guest Actress in a Comedy Series	Malcolm in the Middle	Nominated	
2002	Outstanding Guest Actress in a Comedy Series	Malcolm in the Middle	Won	
2003	Outstanding Guest Actress in a Comedy Series	Malcolm in the Middle	Nominated	
2004	Outstanding Guest Actress in a Comedy Series	Malcolm in the Middle	Nominated	
2005	Outstanding Guest Actress in a Comedy Series	Malcolm in the Middle	Nominated	
2005	Outstanding Guest Actress in a Drama Series	Joan of Arcadia	Nominated	
2006	Outstanding Supporting Actress in a Miniseries or a Movie	Mrs. Harris	Nominated	
2006	Outstanding Guest Actress in a Comedy Series	Malcolm in the Middle	Won	
2011	Outstanding Guest Actress in a Comedy Series	Raising Hope	Nominated	
Daytime Emmy Awards
1984	Outstanding Performer in Children's Programming	ABC Afterschool Special (episode: "The Woman Who Willed a Miracle")	Won	

=== Golden Globe Awards ===
Year	Category	Nominated work	Result	Ref.
Golden Globes
1972	Best Supporting Actress – Motion Picture	The Last Picture Show	Nominated	
1974	Best Actress in a Motion Picture – Musical or Comedy	Charley and the Angel	Nominated	
1975	Best Actress in a Motion Picture – Musical or Comedy	Young Frankenstein	Nominated	
1976	Best Actress in a Television Series – Musical or Comedy	Phyllis	Won	

=== Actor Awards ===
Year	Category	Nominated work	Result	Ref.
Actor Awards
2005	Outstanding Performance by a Female Actor in a Supporting Role	Spanglish	Nominated	
2007	Outstanding Performance by a Female Actor in a Miniseries or Television Movie	Mrs. Harris	Nominated	

== Miscellaneous awards and nominations ==
Awards and nominations received by Cloris Leachman
Award	Year	Nominated work	Category	Result	Ref.
AARP Movies for Grownups Awards	2005	Spanglish	Best Actress	Nominated	
AARP Movies for Grownups Awards	2009	The Women	Best Supporting Actress	Nominated	
Coronado Island Film Festival Awards	2019	—N/a	Legacy Award	Won	
Dorian Awards	2010	—N/a	Timeless Star	Won	
Gemini Awards	2001	Twice in a Lifetime	Best Guest Actress in a Drama Series	Nominated	
Genie Awards	1980	Yesterday	Best Performance by a Foreign Actress	Nominated	
Golden Apple Awards	1975	—N/a	Female Star of the Year	Nominated	
Heartland International Film Festival Awards	2019	—N/a	Pioneering Spirit Award	Won	
Hoboken International Film Festival Awards	2009	—N/a	Lifetime Achievement Award	Won	
Kansas City Film Critics Circle Awards	1972	The Last Picture Show	Best Supporting Actress	Won	
National Board of Review Awards	1971	The Last Picture Show	Best Supporting Actress	Won	
National Society of Film Critics Awards	1971	The Last Picture Show	Best Supporting Actress	Runner-up	
New York Film Critics Circle Awards	1972	The Last Picture Show	Best Supporting Actress	Runner-up	
Oil Valley Film Festival Awards	2022	Not to Forget	Outstanding Supporting Acting – Feature	Won	
Outfest Awards	2021	Jump, Darling	International Narrative Feature – Performance (Special Mention)	Won	
Satellite Awards	2005	Spanglish	Best Supporting Actress in a Motion Picture – Comedy or Musical	Nominated	
Stinkers Bad Movie Awards	2007	Beerfest	Worst Supporting Actress	Nominated	
Stinkers Bad Movie Awards	2007	Beerfest	Most Annoying Accent – Female	Nominated	
TCA Awards	2011	—N/a	Career Achievement Award	Nominated	
Theatre World Awards	1951	A Story for a Sunday Evening	Best Debut Performance	Won	
Women's Image Network Awards	2008	—N/a	Lifetime Achievement	Won	
Women's Image Network Awards	2013	Raising Hope	Outstanding Actress in a Comedy Series	Nominated	

== Other honors ==
Other accolades received by Cloris Leachman
Organization	Year	Honor	Ref.
American Academy of Achievement	1974	Golden Plate	
Emmy Awards	2011	Television Hall of Fame	
Hollywood Walk of Fame	1980	Star for merits on Television	

== See also ==
- List of Cloris Leachman performances
