= Sharron Miller =

American film director

- Born: Enid, Oklahoma
- Occupations: Director, screenwriter, producer

Sharron Miller is an American television and film director, producer, and screenwriter. She is one of the pioneering women directors who worked regularly in mainstream Hollywood in the 1970s and 1980s (along with Elaine May, Lee Grant, Perry Miller Adato, Joan Darling, Joan Micklin Silver, Karen Arthur, Lela Swift, Gabrielle Beaumont, Nell Cox, Gwen Arner, Randa Haines, and Kim Friedman). In 1984 she was the first woman ever to win the coveted Directors Guild of America Award (DGA Award) for directing a narrative (non-documentary) work. Perry Miller Adato was the first woman to receive the DGA Award in 1977 for her documentary about Georgia O'Keeffe.

== Career ==
Born in Enid, Oklahoma and raised in Perry, Oklahoma, Miller began writing and directing short films as a teenager. After graduating from Oklahoma State University in 1971 with a degree in Theatre, she attended graduate school in Film at Northwestern University. In 1972, she went to Hollywood and worked as a script supervisor, sound editor, and film editor before becoming a professional director in 1976 when she was hired to direct the NBC television series, The Life and Times of Grizzly Adams. This made her one of the handful of women directing in Hollywood at that time. She also edited the theatrical film Guardian of the Wilderness in 1976, the true story of mountaineer Galen Clark and Abraham Lincoln saving Yosemite from being destroyed by logging companies.

She has written and directed several short films, but the majority of her work has been in television where she has had a long and prolific career directing television movies and series. Early in her career she studied with acting teachers Jack Garfein, Harold Clurman, and Jeff Corey, and has demonstrated an ability to elicit strong performances from actors. Sharon Gless, Cloris Leachman and Peggy McCay all won Emmy Awards under her direction, and James Stacy received an Emmy nomination.

In 1983 Miller won the DGA Award, two Emmy Awards, the Peabody Award and the Christopher Award for the ABC Afterschool Special she produced and directed, The Woman Who Willed a Miracle. This drama follows the true story of Leslie Lemke, the blind and intellectually disabled boy with cerebral palsy who became world-famous as a savant pianist. It is one of the most well-known Afterschool Specials, receiving Emmy Awards in all the major categories.

In 1987 she was nominated for the DGA Award and an Emmy Award for directing two different episodes of the series, Cagney & Lacey (Turn, Turn, Turn part 1 and Turn, Turn, Turn part 2)

== Selected filmography ==
Film

Year	Title	Director	Producer	Writer	Editor
1981	Cradle Song	Yes	Yes	Yes	Yes
1978	The House of the Dead	Yes	No	No	Yes
1976	Deportee	Yes	Yes	Yes	Yes
1973	Down Home	Yes	Yes	Yes	Yes
1971	Felice	Yes	Yes	Yes	Yes

Television

Year	Title	Notes
2002	The District	Director
2001–2002	That's Life	Director, Multiple episodes
1999	Hyperion Bay	Director, Multiple episodes
1998	Any Day Now	Director
1997-1998	Fame L.A.	Director, Multiple episodes
1996	The Client	Director
1996	Mr. & Mrs. Smith	Director
1995	Christy	Director
1994	Hotel Malibu	Director, Pilot
1993	Second Chances	Director, Multiple episodes
1992–1993	Homefront	Director, Multiple episodes
1993	Sisters	Director
1990–1992	The Trials of Rosie O'Neill	Director, Multiple episodes
1991	Father Dowling Mysteries	Director
1990	The Outsiders	Director, Pilot
1989	China Beach	Director
1988	Little Girl Lost	Director, TV movie
1988	Pigeon Feathers	Director, PBS American Playhouse Drama
1988	Knightwatch	Director, Also editor
1984–1988	Cagney & Lacey	Director, Multiple episodes
1986–1987	L.A. Law	Director, Multiple episodes
1986	Pleasures	Director, TV movie
1984	The Paper Chase	Director
1984	Maximum Security	Director, Also editor
1983-1985	This is the Life	Director, Multiple episodes
1983	The Woman Who Willed a Miracle	Director, Also producer, ABC Afterschool Special
1979–81	In Search of ...	Multiple episodes. Also producer, writer and editor
1976–78	The Life and Times of Grizzly Adams	Director, Multiple episodes

== Awards ==
Year	Award	Result	Category	Series
1983	Peabody Award	Won	Television Special	ABC Afterschool Special "The Woman Who Willed a Miracle"
1983	Daytime Emmy Award	Won	Outstanding Individual Direction in Children's Programming	ABC Afterschool Special "The Woman Who Willed a Miracle"
1983	Daytime Emmy Award	Won	Outstanding Children's Entertainment Special	ABC Afterschool Special "The Woman Who Willed a Miracle"
1983	Christopher Award	Won	Television Special	ABC Afterschool Special "The Woman Who Willed a Miracle"
1983	Film Advisory Board Award of Excellence	Won	Television Special	ABC Afterschool Special "The Woman Who Willed a Miracle"
1983	New York International Film and TV Festival	Won	Gold Medal	This Is the Life (Episode "Bon Voyage and Shalom")
1983	Directors Guild of America Award	Won	Outstanding Directorial Achievement in Dramatic Shows – Daytime	ABC Afterschool Special "The Woman Who Willed a Miracle"
1984	New York International Film and TV Festival	Won	Gold Medal	This Is the Life (Episode "Reprise for the Lord")
1985	New York International Film and TV Festival		Gold Medal	This Is the Life (Episode "The Face of Gabriel Ortiz")
1987	Viewers for Quality Television Award		Best Director in a Quality Drama Series	Cagney & Lacey (Episode "Turn, Turn, Turn", part 2)
1987	Humanitas Prize Certificate		For Humanizing Achievement in Television	Cagney & Lacey (Episode "Turn, Turn, Turn", part 2)
1987	CINE Golden Eagle Award		Drama	American Playhouse (Episode "Pigeon Feathers")
1988	Women in Film Award		Lillian Gish Award for Excellence in Episodic Directing	Cagney & Lacey (Episode "Don't I Know You?")
1988	Humanitas Prize Certificate		For Humanizing Achievement in Television	Cagney & Lacey (Episode "Don't I Know You?")
2023	Lumine Lifetime Achievement Award		For significant and sustained contributions to the media industry	
1987	Primetime Emmy Award	Nominated	Outstanding Directing in a Drama Series	Cagney & Lacey (Episode "Turn, Turn, Turn", part 2)
1987	Directors Guild of America Award	Nominated	Outstanding Directing in a Drama Series	Cagney & Lacey (Episode "Turn, Turn, Turn", part 1)

== Memberships ==
- Directors Guild of America
- Academy of Television Arts and Sciences
