= List of Cloris Leachman performances =

Film, television and theatre credits of American actress Cloris Leachman

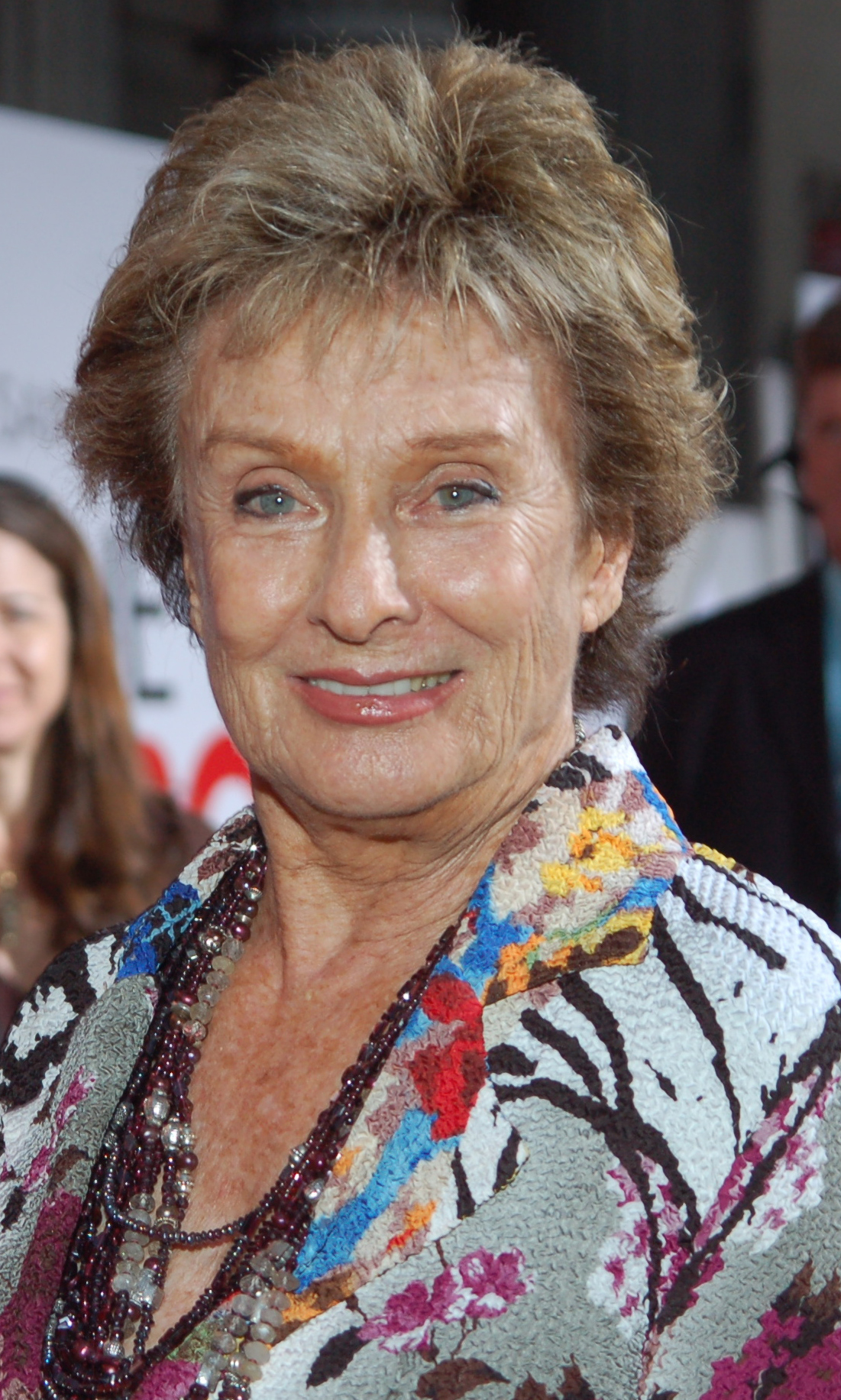
At the premiere for The Proposal in 2009

The following is the list of film, television and theatre credits of American actress Cloris Leachman. She appeared in films including Butch Cassidy and the Sundance Kid (1969), The Last Picture Show (1971), Young Frankenstein (1974), Yesterday (1981), A Troll in Central Park (1994), Now and Then (1995), Spanglish (2004), New York, I Love You (2008), and The Croods (2013). Her television work included her reoccurring role on The Mary Tyler Moore Show (1970–1975) which then led to her own spinoff, Phyllis (1975–1977). She starred in the ABC Afterschool Special The Woman Who Willed a Miracle in 1983 and appeared on The Facts of Life (1986–1988), Malcolm in the Middle (2001–2006), and Raising Hope (2010–2014).

== Film ==
Leachman in 1975

Year	Title	Role	Notes
1947	Carnegie Hall	Dancing Nightclub Patron	Uncredited
1955	Kiss Me Deadly	Christina Bailey	
1956	The Rack	Caroline	
1962	The Chapman Report	Miss Selby	
1969	Butch Cassidy and the Sundance Kid	Agnes	
1970	WUSA	Philomene	
1970	The People Next Door	Tina Hoffman	
1970	Lovers and Other Strangers	Bernice Henderson	
1971	The Steagle	Rita Weiss	
1971	The Last Picture Show	Ruth Popper	
1973	Charley and the Angel	Nettie Appleby	
1973	Dillinger	Anna Sage	
1973	Happy Mother's Day, Love George	Ronda	
1974	Daisy Miller	Mrs. Ezra Miller	
1974	Young Frankenstein	Frau Blücher	
1975	Crazy Mama	Melba Stokes	
1977	The Mouse and His Child	Euterpe	Voice
1977	High Anxiety	Nurse Diesel	
1979	The North Avenue Irregulars	Claire Porter	
1979	The Muppet Movie	Lord's Secretary	
1979	Scavenger Hunt	Mildred Carruthers	
1980	Herbie Goes Bananas	Aunt Louise Trends	
1980	Foolin' Around	Samantha	
1981	Yesterday	Mrs. Kramer	
1981	History of the World, Part I	Madame Defarge	
1981	My Strange Uncle		IMAX Short film
1986	Shadow Play	Millie Crown	
1986	My Little Pony: The Movie	Hydia	Voice
1986	Castle in the Sky	Dola	Voice, English dub
1987	Hansel and Gretel	Griselda	
1987	Walk Like a Man	Margaret Shand	
1988	Going to the Chapel	Mrs. Haldane	
1989	Prancer	Mrs. McFarland	
1990	Texasville	Ruth Popper	
1990	Love Hurts	Ruth Weaver	
1991	The Giant of Thunder Mountain	Narrator / The Elder Amy	
1991	Picture This		Documentary
1993	My Boyfriend's Back	Maggie The Zombie Expert	
1993	The Beverly Hillbillies	Daisy May "Granny" Moses	
1994	A Troll in Central Park	Gnorga	Voice
1995	Nobody's Girls: Five Women of the West		Documentary
1995	Now and Then	Grandma Albertson	
1996	Beavis and Butt-Head Do America	Old Woman on Plane and Bus	Voice
1996	Never Too Late	Olive	
1997	Annabelle's Wish	Aunt Agnes	Voice
1999	Gen^{13}	Helga	Voice
1999	The Iron Giant	Mrs. Lynley Tensedge	Voice
1999	Music of the Heart	Assunta Guaspari	
2000	Hanging Up	Pat Mozell	
2001	The Amati Girls	Dolly Amati	
2002	Manna from Heaven	Helen	
2003	Alex & Emma	Grandmother	
2003	Bad Santa	Grandma	Uncredited
2004	Spanglish	Evelyn Wright	
2005	Buzz		Documentary
2005	The Longest Yard	Lynette	
2005	Sky High	Nurse Spex	
2005	The Californians	Eileen Boatwright	
2006	Scary Movie 4	Mrs. Norris	
2006	Beerfest	Great Gam Gam	
2008	The Women	Maggie	
2008	New York, I Love You	Mitzie	Segment: "Joshua Marston"
2009	American Cowslip	Sandy	
2009	Ponyo	Kayo	Voice, English dub
2009	Inglourious Basterds	Mrs. Himmelstein	Scenes cut
2010	Expecting Mary	Annie	
2010	You Again	Helen Sullivan	Uncredited
2011	The Fields	Gladys	
2012	Gambit	Grandma Merle	
2012	Adult World	Mary Anne	
2012	The Oogieloves in the Big Balloon Adventure	Dottie Rounder	
2012	Foodfight!	Brand X Lunch Lady	Voice
2013	The Croods	Gran	Voice
2015	The Wedding Ringer	Grandma Palmer	
2015	This Is Happening	Estelle	
2015	Scouts Guide to the Zombie Apocalypse	Ms. Fielder	
2015	Unity	Narrator	Documentary
2015	Baby, Baby, Baby	Evelyn Zingerelli	
2016	So B. It	Alice Wilinsky	
2016	The Bronx Bull	Lillian Forrester	
2016	The Comedian	May Conner	
2016	Recalculating	Texter	Short film
2017	The Gliksmans	Helen Neuman	
2018	I Can Only Imagine	Memaw Leona Millard	
2018	Lez Bomb	Josephine	
2018	It's Who You Know	Liz	Short film
2019	When We Last Spoke	Itasca	
2020	The Croods: A New Age	Gran	Voice
2020	Jump, Darling	Margaret	
2021	High Holiday	Nana	Posthumous release
2021	Not to Forget	Donna	Posthumous release; final film role

== Television ==
Year	Title	Role	Notes
1948	The Ford Theatre Hour	Dora the Maid	Episode: "Night Must Fall"
1949	Hold It Please	Herself – Panelist	Canceled after 3 episodes
1950	The Nash Airflyte Theater	Tuppence Blunt	Episode: "The Case of the Missing Lady"
1950–1952	Charlie Wild, Private Detective	Effie Perrine	57 episodes
1950–1954	The Philco Television Playhouse	Various	4 episodes
1951	Somerset Maugham TV Theatre	Mildred Rodgers	Episode: "Of Human Bondage"
1951	Studio One	Mrs. Adams	Episode: "Screwball"
1951–1952	Suspense	Various	6 episodes
1952	Bob and Ray	Herself	Series regular
1952	Hallmark Hall of Fame	Martha Berry	Episode: "Forgotten Children"
1953–1954	Pond's Theater	Various	2 episodes
1955	Screen Directors Playhouse	Irma	Episode: "Life of Vernon Hathaway"
1955	Alfred Hitchcock Presents	Susan Stanger	Season 1 Episode 2: "Premonition"
1955, 1958	Climax!	Anne Colt / Mrs. Sullivan	2 episodes
1955, 1962	General Electric Theatre	Miriam Raskin / Leah Beth	2 episodes
1956	Lux Video Theatre	Dottie	Episode: "A Marriage Day"
1956	Dick Powell's Zane Grey Theatre	Martha Jessop	Episode: "You Only Run Once"
1956, 1961	Gunsmoke	Boni / Flory Tibbs	2 episodes
1957	Telephone Time	Molly Brown	Episode: "The Unsinkable Molly Brown"
1957–1958	Lassie	Ruth Martin	28 episodes
1958	The Frank Sinatra Show	Helen Wasson	Episode: "The Brownstone Incident"
1958	Alfred Hitchcock Presents	Mary Templeton	Season 4 Episode 2: "Don't Interrupt"
1959	Alcoa Presents: One Step Beyond	Rita Wallace	Episode: "The Dark Room"
1960	The Man in the Moon	Herself – Performer	Variety special
1960	Johnny Staccato	Jessica Winthrop	Episode: "Solomon"
1960	Rawhide	Mary Ann Belden	Episode: "Incident of the Arana Sacar"
1960	Thriller	Beatrice	Episode: "Girl with a Secret"
1960	Wanted Dead or Alive	Ann Barchester	Episode: "The Medicine Man"
1960	Outlaws	Maddy	2 episodes
1960	Checkmate	Marilyn Parker	Episode: "The Mask of Vengeance"
1960	Shirley Temple's Storybook	Martha	Episode: "The Indian Captive"
1960–1961	The Loretta Young Show	Ruth Harron / Ella	2 episodes
1961	Hawaiian Eye	Ginny Whittier	Episode: "Man in a Rage"
1961	The Donna Reed Show	Iris	Episode: "Mouse at Play"
1961	Frontier Circus	Anna	Episode: "The Hunter and the Hunted"
1961	The Twilight Zone	Mrs. Fremont	Episode: "It's a Good Life"
1961	Cain's Hundred	Katie Cortner	Episode: "The Fixer"
1961	The Untouchables	Billie Mailer	Episode: "Jigsaw"
1961–1963	77 Sunset Strip	Various	3 episodes
1962	Alcoa Premiere	Meg Bent	Episode: "The Doctor"
1962	Target: The Corruptors!	Betty	Episode: "The Wrecker"
1962	Route 66	Lydia	Episode: "Love is a Skinny Kid"
1962	Laramie	Sarah	Episode: "Trial by Fire"
1962	Wagon Train	Nancy Lee Davis	Episode: "The Nancy Lee Davis Story"
1962	The New Breed	Elsie Condon	Episode: "Judgement at San Belito"
1962	The Untouchables	Julie Liemer	Episode: "Man in the Middle"
1962	Kraft Mystery Theatre	Joan Lindsay	Episode: "Night Panic"
1962	Going My Way	Karen Murdock	Episode: "Keep an Eye on Santa Claus"
1962	The New Loretta Young Show	Sugar Burnside	Episode: "Anything for a Laugh"
1962	Stoney Burke	Eunice Stocker	Episode: "Cousin Eunice"
1962	Saints and Sinners	Helen Graham	Episode: "A Night of Horns and Bells"
1962	Alfred Hitchcock Presents	Caroline Hardy	Season 7 Episode 38: "Where Beauty Lies"
1964	The Defenders	Angela Simms	Episode: "Conflict of Interests"
1965	Mr. Novak	Dorothy Hummer	Two-part episode "Faculty Follies"
1965	A Man Called Shenandoah	Laurie Sherman	Episode: "The Caller"
1965	The Trials of O'Brien	Isobel Ballentine	Episode: "Goodbye and Keep Cool"
1965	Dr. Kildare	Rhoda Kirsh	5 episodes
1966	Perry Mason	Gloria Shine	Episode: "The Case of the Crafty Kidnapper"
1967	Run for Your Life	Deborah Wilson	Episode: "The List of Alice McKenna"
1967	The Big Valley	Fay	Episode: "Plunder"
1967	The Road West	Amadee	Episode: "The Eighty-Seven Dollar Bride"
1967	The Guns of Will Sonnett	Vera	Episode: "And A Killing Rode Into Town"
1967, 1969	The Virginian	Ellen McKinley / Clara	2 episodes
1968	Adam-12	Judy	Episode: "Log 141: The Color TV Bandit"
1968	The Name of the Game	Vera Walker	Episode: "Nightmare"
1968	Mannix	Barker's Ex-Wife	Episode: "The Need of a Friend"
1968	Judd, for the Defense	Louise Lockhart	Episode: "Punishments, Cruel and Unusual"
1969	Ironside	Molly Strong	Episode: "Goodbye to Yesterday"
1969	Lancer	Angel Day / Hester McLaughlin	2 episodes
1970	Marcus Welby, M.D.	Jean Cullen	Episode: "A Very Special Sailfish"
1970	That Girl	Sandi	Episode: "Don and Sandi and Harry and Snoopy"
1970–1977	The Mary Tyler Moore Show	Phyllis Lindstrom	34 episodes
1972	Night Gallery	Mrs. Fulton	Episode: "You Can't Get Help Like That Anymore"
1972	The Sixth Sense	Judith Eaton	Episode: "Witch, Witch, Burning Bright"
1972	Young Dr. Kildare	Julie's Mother	Episode: "The Night of the Intern"
1972	Of Thee I Sing	Mary Turner	CBS adaptation of Gershwin musical
1974	Rhoda	Phyllis Lindstrom	Episodes: "Rhoda's Wedding" (Part 1 & 2)
1975–1977	Phyllis	Phyllis Lindstrom	48 episodes
1975	Wonder Woman	Queen Hippolyta	Episode: "The New Original Wonder Woman"
1977	The Muppet Show	Herself – Guest Star	Episode: "Cloris Leachman"
1977	Yabba Dabba Doo! The Happy World of Hanna-Barbera	Herself – Special Guest	Documentary
1979	Backstairs at the White House	Mrs. Elizabeth Jaffray	Miniseries
1979	The Associates	Mary Nicholson	Episode: "Mr. Marshall's Love Affair"
1983	ABC Afterschool Special	May Lemke	Episode: "The Woman Who Willed a Miracle"
1984–1985	The Love Boat	Lisa Andersen / Karen Cooper	3 episodes
1985	American Playhouse	Bess Dischinger	Episode: "Breakfast with Les and Bess"
1986–1988	The Facts of Life	Beverly Ann Stickle	48 episodes
1987	Schoolhouse Rock!	Presenter	Direct to video; Goldenvision era videos only
1987	Our House	Miss Temple	Episode: "A Silent, Fallen Tree"
1989	The Nutt House	Ms. Frick / Mrs. Nutt	10 episodes
1990	Ferris Bueller	Grandma Margaret	Episode: "Scenes from a Grandma"
1991	Mary Tyler Moore: The 20th Anniversary Show	Herself	Documentary
1991	The Simpsons	Mrs. Glick	Voice, episode: "Three Men and a Comic Book"
1991	Sunday Dinner	Georgianna Romani	Episode: "Whose House Is It Anyway?"
1991–1992	Walter & Emily	Emily Collins	13 episodes
1992–1993	The Powers That Be	Enid Powers	2 episodes
1994	The Nanny	Clara Mueller	Episode: "The Nanny-In-Law"
1995	Maybe This Time	Beasy McDonough	Episode: "Beasy Body"
1996–1997	Promised Land	Ethel Mooster	2 episodes
1997–2003	Touched by an Angel	Ruth	4 episodes
1999	Thanks	Grammy Winthrop	6 episodes
2000	The Norm Show	Mrs. Beaumont	Episode: "Norm vs. the Oldest Profession"
2000	Twice in a Lifetime	Ruth Harper / Miss Storey	Episode: "Grandma's Shoes"
2000	Love & Money	Beverly Lapeer	Episode: "The Step Mummy"
2001	Diagnosis: Murder	Sudie (Nurse/Home Care Aid)	Episode: "On the Beach"
2001–2006	Malcolm in the Middle	Grandma Ida	11 episodes
2001–2002	The Ellen Show	Dot Richmond	18 episodes
2002	The Mary Tyler Moore Reunion	Herself	Documentary
2003	The Twilight Zone	Mrs. Fremont	Episode: "It's Still a Good Life"
2003	Happy Family	Lois	Episode: "Mother and Child Reunion"
2005	Family Guy	Herself	Voice, episode: "Petarded"
2005	Two and a Half Men	Norma	Episode: "Madame and Her Special Friend"
2005	Joan of Arcadia	Aunt Olive	Episode: "The Cat"
2007	The Wedding Bells	Edith Fleischman	Episode: "The Fantasy"
2008	Comedy Central Roast	Herself	Episode: "Roast of Bob Saget"
2008	Dancing with the Stars	Herself – Celebrity contestant	17 episodes
2009	The Office	Lily Hanaday	Episode: "Stress Relief"
2009	Hawthorne	Ms. Edna Lachman	Episode: "Healing Time"
2009–2014	Phineas and Ferb	Anne Doofenshmirtz, Eliza Feyersied	Voice, 5 episodes
2010–2014	Raising Hope	Barbara June "Maw Maw" Thompson	83 episodes
2010	Blue Mountain State	Professor's Mom	Episode: "Midterms"
2010	Kathy Griffin: My Life on the D-List	Herself	Episode: "Maggie, the Musical"
2010	RuPaul's Drag Race	Herself	Episode: "Golden Gals"; special guest judge with Debbie Reynolds
2012	Top Gear	Herself	Episode: "Limos"
2012	Adventure Time	Old Marceline	Voice, 2 episodes
2013	Kirstie	Shirley Kluszewski	Episode: "Little Bummer Boy"
2013	Hot in Cleveland	Peg	Episode: "Love Is All Around"
2013	Raising Hope	Norma June Mayfair	Episode: "Mother's Day"
2014	Franklin & Bash	Irina Lottye Kruskal	Episode: "Spirits in the Material World"
2014–2015	Girl Meets World	Mrs. Svorski	2 episodes
2014–2016	Creative Galaxy	Gallaria	11 episodes
2015	The Millers	Louise	Episode: "Louise Louise"
2015	Hawaii Five-0	Ruth Tennenbaum	Episode: "Kuka'awale (Stakeout)"
2016	The Eleventh	Margaret	5 episodes
2016	Bob's Burgers	Meryl	Voice, episode: "Secret Admiral-irer"
2016	Royal Pains	Annette Bellamy	Episode: "The Good News Is..."
2016	Clarence	Cloris	Voice, episode: "Cloris"
2017–2018	Justice League Action	Granny Goodness	Voice, 4 episodes
2017–2019	American Gods	Zorya Vechernyaya	3 episodes
2018–2020	Elena of Avalor	Hool	Voice, 3 episodes
2019	Teachers	Anne 'Memaw' Lucas	Episode: "Wedded Miss"
2019	Mad About You	Mrs. Alice Mandelbaum	Episode: "Boundaries and Nakedness"

== Television films ==
Year	Title	Role
1969	Silent Night, Lonely Night	Ginny
1971	Suddenly Single	Joanne Hackett
1972	Haunts of the Very Rich	Ellen Blunt
1972	Of Thee I Sing	Mary Turner
1973	A Brand New Life	Victoria Douglas
1973	Crime Club	Hilary Kelton
1973	Dying Room Only	Jean Mitchell
1974	The Migrants	Viola Barlow
1974	Hitchhike!	Claire Stevens
1974	Thursday's Game	Lois Ellison
1974	Death Sentence	Susan Davies
1975	Someone I Touched	Laura Hyatt
1975	Ladies of the Corridor	Lulu Ames
1975	A Girl Named Sooner	Old Mam Hawes
1975	Death Scream	Mrs. Singleton
1976	The Love Boat	Iris Havlicek
1977	It Happened One Christmas	Clara Oddbody
1978	Long Journey Back	Laura Casella
1979	Willa	Darla Jean
1979	Mrs. R's Daughter	Ruth Randell
1979	S.O.S. Titanic	Molly Brown
1981	The Acorn People	Nurse Betty Nelson
1981	Advice to the Lovelorn	Maggie Dale
1982	Miss All-American Beauty	Agatha Blaine
1983	Dixie: Changing Habits	Sister Eugenio
1983	The Demon Murder Case	Joan Greenway
1984	Ernie Kovacs: Between the Laughter	Mary Kovacs
1985	Deadly Intentions	Charlotte Raynor
1985	Blind Alleys	Fran Sato
1985	The Little Troll Prince	Queen Sirena (voice)
1987	The Facts of Life Down Under	Beverly Ann Stickle
1990	Fine Things	Ruth Fine
1991	In Broad Daylight	Ruth Westerman
1991	A Little Piece of Heaven	Edwina 'Ed' McKevin
1993	Spies	Pamela Beale
1993	Fade to Black	Ruth
1993	Double, Double, Toil and Trouble	Aunt Agatha/Aunt Sofia
1993	Without a Kiss Goodbye	Mrs. Samuels
1993	Miracle Child	Doc Betty
1995	Between Love and Honor	Anna Collura
2005	Mrs. Harris	Pearl 'Billie' Schwartz, Tarnower's Sister
2007	Lake Placid 2	Sadie Bickerman
2007	Love Takes Wing	Hattie Clarence

== Theater ==
- Ah, Wilderness! (Des Moines, 1942)
- Blithe Spirit (Northwestern University, 1943)
- Sundown Beach (Broadway, 1948. Directed by Elia Kazan)
- South Pacific (Broadway, 1951; month-long replacement for Martha Wright)
- Come Back, Little Sheba (Pre-Broadway tryout, 1950; left cast to star in As You Like It)
- As You Like It (Broadway, 1950)
- A Story for a Sunday Evening (Broadway, 1950; Won Theatre World Award)
- "Let Me Hear the Melody" (1951. Directed by Burgess Meredith. Starring Anthony Quinn)
- Lo and Behold! (Broadway, 1952)
- Dear Barbarians (Broadway, 1952)
- Sunday Breakfast (Broadway, 1952)
- The Day Before Spring (Palm Beach, Florida, 1953)
- The Crucible (Broadway, 1953; replacement for Madeleine Sherwood)
- King of Hearts (Broadway, 1954)
- A Touch of the Poet (Broadway, 1958; replacement for Kim Stanley)
- Masquerade (Broadway, 1959)
- Twigs (Marriott Theater in Lincolnshire, Illinois, 1978)
- The Oldest Living Graduate (1980)
- Twigs (Drury Lane Theater, Water Tower Place, Chicago, Illinois 1981)
- High Spirits (Broadway opening eventually cancelled, 1981)
- A Couple of White Chicks Sitting Around Talking (Drury Lane Theater, Water Tower Place, Chicago, Illinois 1983)
- A Little Family Business (Drury Lane Oak Brook, Illinois, 1985)
- A Fatal Weakness (Monaco, 1985)
- Grandma Moses: An American Primitive (US national tour, 1989)
- Show Boat (US national tour, 1994)
- Young Frankenstein (workshop for the musical, 2006)

== See also ==
- List of awards and nominations received by Cloris Leachman
