= Angelina (Bob Dylan song) =

1981 song written by Bob Dylan

Song by Bob Dylan

from the album The Bootleg Series Volumes 1-3 (Rare & Unreleased) 1961-1991
- Released: March 26, 1991
- Recorded: March 26, 1981
- Studio: Rundown Studios (Santa Monica, California)
- Length: 6:58
- Label: Columbia
- Songwriter(s): Bob Dylan
- Producer(s): Jimmy Iovine

"Angelina" is a song by American singer-songwriter Bob Dylan, recorded on March 26, 1981, for his album Shot of Love but not included on the record. The song was written by Dylan and produced by Jimmy Iovine. A version was released on The Bootleg Series Volumes 1-3 (Rare & Unreleased) 1961-1991 on March 26, 1991, exactly ten years later. A different take was issued on The Bootleg Series Vol. 16: Springtime in New York 1980–1985 in 2021. Critics have expressed their lack of understanding of the lyrics, whilst generally affording the song a positive reception. Dylan's rhyming of the name in the title of the song with "concertina", "hyena", "subpoena", "Argentina" and "arena" has attracted commentary, with scholar Nicholas Birns calling the rhymes "bravura and ... provocative".

== Background and recording ==
"Angelina" was written by Bob Dylan after the end of his Gospel Tour, which concluded in May 1980. In October 1980, he recorded a version at Rundown Studios, Santa Monica, with himself on vocals and guitar, Fred Tackett (guitar and mandolin), Willie Smith (keyboards), Tim Drummond (bass), Jim Keltner (drums), and Clydie King, Carolyn Dennis and Regina McCrary (background vocals) Two takes were recorded on March 26, 1981, at Rundown Studios, with Jimmy Iovine as producer, during the sessions for Dylan's 21st studio album, Shot of Love. The 1981 sessions featured Dylan singing and playing piano, Drummond, Keltner, Dennis, McCrary and King in the same roles as on the 1980 version, Steve Ripley on guitar and Carl Pickhardt on keyboards. They were joined on the second take by Danny Kortchmar playing guitar.

Although "Angelina" had originally been chosen by Dylan to be the closing track of Shot of Love, it was cut from the album. Dylan has not explained the reasons for the song being omitted. On March 26, 1991, a second take, that featured piano and organ prominently, was released on The Bootleg Series Volumes 1-3 (Rare & Unreleased) 1961-1991. The first take, with a full band, was issued on The Bootleg Series Vol. 16: Springtime in New York 1980–1985 in 2021.

== Composition and lyrical interpretation ==
Several commentators have expressed their inability to conclusively determine the mood or subject of the song. Scholar Nicholas Birns suggests that "one cannot quite know whether its mode is rapture, tribute, elegy, or rage." Author Michael Gray calls it "a difficult song to comprehend ... because of the disconnectedness, the impossible images, the general air of smudging that clings to it and the collision of the narrative into different genres as it passes." In 2004, Gray felt that the opening couplet:

Well, it's always been my nature to take chances
My right hand drawin' back while my left hand advances

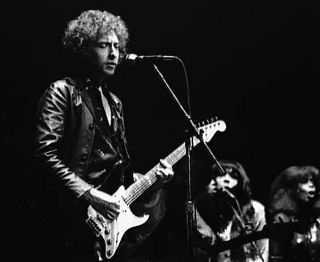
Dylan performing in April 1980

was different from any of Dylan's other works, as it "appears candidly self-defining". Critic Oliver Trager wrote in 2004 that "Angelina" was unlike any of Dylan's other songs, "part surreal film, part cubist painting, and every bit as fractured as that combination suggests." Trager also noted that the song has some similarities with the opening chorus of the Gilbert and Sullivan work Trial by Jury, which references the character of Angeline, who is later called into court in the comic opera. Dylan biographer Clinton Heylin felt that the song could be regarded as a commentary on the final verses of Dylan's "Caribbean Wind" and "The Groom's Still Waiting at the Altar", both written at around the same time. Author Jim Beviglia thought that the name Angelina was chosen for its religious connotations, and speculated that the song could be addressing its narrator's faith rather than a person.

The lyrics reference various biblical verses, and refer to monkeys, giants, and four-faced angels. Each of the five verses has eight lines, with an AAABCCCB rhyming pattern; in all but one verse, the last line ends with the title, "Angelina". Birns described Dylan's rhyming, for example, of "Angelina" with "concertina", "subpoena", and particularly "Argentina", as "bravura and ... provocative", and noted that there was a repressive administration in Argentina when the song was composed. Heylin noted that other rhyming words used are "hyena" and "arena", and has called the song "a collection of lines bound together by a rhyming dictionary". Critic Paul Williams opined that "the 'feeling' of the Book of Revelation" invoked by Dylan's use of biblical imagery, rather than an understanding of each element, was important to appreciate the song.

The second verse opens with "Blood dryin' in my yellow hair as I go from shore to shore", which Gray proposes shows that the narrator is not Dylan. In one version, Angelina is described as having eyes that "were two slits, make any snake proud", and "With a face any painter would paint", and "well endowed". In a 1981 interview, Dylan compared the musical feel of the song to his own "Visions of Johanna", and said that "it seems to be very sensitive and gentle on one level, then on another level the lyrics aren't sensitive or gentle at all." Williams argued that "the lyrics are brilliant, but they only take on meaning as [Dylan] sings them", and that "to know the most private secrets of Dylan's relationship with God, with Woman, with his art and his audience, listen to the sound of his voice during this performance."

According to Dylan's official website, he has never played the song in concert.

== Critical reception ==
=== The Bootleg Series Volumes 1–3 (1991) ===
Trager wrote that Dylan's performance "is striking as he combines the passion and intrigue of his best work of the mid-1960s." Gray opined that it was one of five 1980s tracks on the album that "it was "madness to have left unissued", although he suggested that the song's impenetrability made it a "compelling, grand failure". In The Guardian, Adam Sweeting wrote that "the phantasmagoric 'Angelina' could only have improved several of [Dylan's] dire eighties records." Beviglia included the track in 71st place in his ranking of Dylan's 100 best songs.

=== The Bootleg Series Vol. 16 (2021) ===
Allen Jones wrote for Uncut that the first take "feels already like something shaping up to be astonishing". Birns refers to the track as a "great Dylan song". For Record Collector, Nick Hasted called it a "wild saga of Revelations surrealism, Reaganite portents and symbolist visions, held together by simmering organ and Dylan's vocal spell". Williams describes the track as one of Dylan's "most disturbing and rewarding performances".

== Personnel ==
Steve Ripley (pictured in 2002) played guitar on "Angelina"

Personnel for the March 26, 1981, versions were as follows:

Musicians Both takes:

- Bob Dylan – vocals, piano
- Steve Ripley – guitar
- Carl Pickhardt – keyboards
- Tim Drummond – bass guitar
- Jim Keltner – drums
- Carolyn Dennis – backing vocals
- Regina McCrary – backing vocals
- Clydie King – backing vocals

Second take only:

- Danny Kortchmar – guitar

Technical

- Jimmy Iovine – producer
