= Leathercoated Minds =

- Genres: Psychedelic
- Years active: 1966-1967
- Past members: J.J. Cale; Terrye Tillison; James Markham; Roger Tillison; Jimmy Karstein

The Leathercoated Minds was a short-lived psychedelic studio-based band with Snuff Garrett and J. J. Cale, which lasted from 1966 to 1967.

== Biography ==
The band produced one album, A Trip down the Sunset Strip, which consisted mainly of cover songs. Its members included J. J. Cale, James Markham, Jimmy Karstein, Roger Tillison, and Terrye Tillison. Karstein had previously played the drums for Gary Lewis & the Playboys.

The group was short-lived, and disbanded a year after forming.

J.J. Cale became an acclaimed solo artist.

Cale (born December 5, 1938) died on July 26, 2013, at his home in San Diego, California, from a heart attack, aged 74.

Roger Tillison (born October 14, 1941) died on December 9, 2013.

Terrye Tillison (born Terrye Anita Newkirk, February 24, 1946) died on June 26, 2018, aged 72. Terrye was married to musician Steve Young from 1969 to 1974.

Jimmy Karstein (born August 22, 1943) died on March 27, 2022, aged 78.

== Members ==
- J. J. Cale - guitar (died 2013)
- James Markham - vocals (died 2018)
- Jimmy Karstein - drums (died 2022)
- Roger Tillison - vocals, bass (died 2013)
- Terrye Tillison - vocals (died 2018)

== A Trip down the Sunset Strip ==
Tracks:

1. "Eight Miles High" (Gene Clark, Jim McGuinn, David Crosby) - 2:03
2. "Sunset and Clark" - 1:58
3. "Psychotic Reaction" (Ken Ellner, Roy Chaney, Craig Atkinson, John Byrne, John Michalski) - 2:23
4. "Over Under Sideways Down" (Chris Dreja, Keith Relf, Jim McCarty, Paul Samwell-Smith) - 2:10
5. "Sunshine Superman" (Donovan) - 3:12
6. "Non-Stop" - 2:30
7. "Arriba" - 2:15
8. "Kicks" (Barry Mann, Cynthia Weil) - 2:40
9. "Mr. Tambourine Man" (Bob Dylan) - 2:08
10. "Puff (The Magic Dragon)" (Peter Yarrow, Leonard Lipton) - 2:26
11. "Along Comes Mary" (Tandyn Almer) - 2:00
12. "Pot Luck" - 2:04
