= Deportee =

Deportee may refer to:

- a deported person through deportation
- Deportees (band), a Swedish musical band
- Deportee (film), 1976 dramatic short film by Sharron Miller
- "Deportee (Plane Wreck at Los Gatos)", a protest song with lyrics by Woody Guthrie
- The Deportees and Other Stories, a short story collection by Roddy Doyle
