= The Groom's Still Waiting at the Altar =

Bob Dylan song

Song by Bob Dylan

from the album Shot of Love
- Released: 1985
- Recorded: May 4, 1981
- Genre: Christian rock; blues rock; hard rock
- Length: 4:04
- Label: Columbia
- Songwriter: Bob Dylan
- Producers: Chuck Plotkin; Bob Dylan

"The Groom's Still Waiting at the Altar" is a song written by Bob Dylan, recorded in Los Angeles in the spring of 1981 and released in September of that year as a B-side to the single "Heart of Mine". The song forms a thematic trio with Dylan's "Caribbean Wind" and "Angelina", two other prominent Shot of Love outtakes that blend complex biblical allusion, dense apocalyptic imagery, and romantic disillusionment. While all three are often highlighted by critics as key omissions from the original 1981 album, "The Groom's Still Waiting at the Altar" was uniquely restored to the track listing on later CD and remastered editions. It was also included on the compilation albums Biograph in 1985, Bob Dylan's Greatest Hits Volume 3 in 1994 and Dylan in 2007.

== Composition ==
In their book Bob Dylan All the Songs: The Story Behind Every Track, authors Philippe Margotin and Jean-Michel Guesdon note that the song was written during the summer of 1980, but that it "could have found its place on Highway 61 Revisited or Blonde on Blonde". They describe the song as "imbued with surrealism and a series of images that are unrelated to each other", but also note the influence of Biblical prophecies on the lyrics, especially an apocalyptic line about the "Curtain risin' on a new age" and a reference to the River Jordan, "beyond which lies the Promised Land of the Hebrews, led by Moses".

== Release ==
"The Groom's Still Waiting at the Altar" was originally released only as a B-side to the "Heart of Mine" single and was not included on Dylan's 1981 album Shot of Love. It was, however, added to reissues of the Shot of Love vinyl LP in 1985, and has been present in all subsequent versions of the album across all formats. It is the only instance of Dylan revising an album's track list after its initial release.

== Reception and legacy ==
Rolling Stone placed the song 90th on a list of the "100 Greatest Bob Dylan Songs of All Time". In an article accompanying the list, musician Todd Snider wrote: "Bob Dylan finds a million different ways to do one-four-five blues, Chuck Berry-style rock & roll, my favorite kind of song. I think there's a story getting told here that I don't totally understand, but who cares? It's just a great poem. I have no idea what the groom's still waiting at the altar for, but I feel terrible for him. Dylan invented this kind of song, where each verse has some wisdom being imparted without being preachy, like, 'I know God has mercy on those that are slandered and humiliated', and, 'I see people who are supposed to know better than to stand around like furniture'. It's perfect. I wish I had thought of it".

Destroyer's Dan Bejar cited it as his favourite Dylan song in a 2021 interview, saying, "He's effectively and kinda manically describing a world that's falling apart, but makes it sound fun. The chaos is infectious".

A 2021 Guardian article included it on a list of "80 Bob Dylan songs everyone should know".

== Credits ==
- Bob Dylan – guitar, harmonica, percussion, piano, keyboards, vocals, producer
- Carolyn Dennis – background vocals
- Steve Douglas – saxophone
- Tim Drummond, Donald Dunn – bass guitar
- Jim Keltner, Ringo Starr – drums [on "Heart of Mine"]
- Clydie King – background vocals
- Danny Kortchmar – electric guitar
- Regina McCrory – background vocals
- Carl Pickhardt – piano
- Madelyn Quebec – background vocals
- Steve Ripley, Fred Tackett, Ronnie Wood – guitar [on "Heart of Mine"]
- William "Smitty" Smith – Hammond organ
- Benmont Tench – keyboards
- Monalisa Young – background vocals

Production

- Vic Anesini – compact disc mastering
- Dana Bisbee – assistant engineer
- Bumps Blackwell – producer
- Ken Perry – original LP mastering
- Chuck Plotkin – producer
- Toby Scott – engineer

== Live versions ==
According to his official website, Dylan played the song five times live. All performances occurred in 1980.

== Notable Covers ==
Rod Stewart's version appeared on his 2009 album Once in a Blue Moon.
