= Have Yourself a Tractors Christmas =

Studio album by the Tractors
- Released: October 10, 1995
- Genre: Country
- Length: 40:58
- Label: Arista Nashville
- Producer: Steve Ripley, Walt Richmond

The Tractors chronology
The Tractors (1994)	Have Yourself a Tractors Christmas (1995)	Farmers in a Changing World (1998)

Professional ratings
Review scores
Source	Rating
AllMusic	3/5 stars

Have Yourself a Tractors Christmas is the second studio album and first Christmas album by American country music band the Tractors. It was released by Arista Nashville on October 10, 1995. The album peaked at number 12 on the Billboard Top Country Albums chart.

The track "Santa Claus Is Comin' (In a Boogie Woogie Choo Choo Train)" is a Christmas-themed reworked version of the band's debut single "Baby Likes to Rock It" from their self-titled debut album.

The album was rereleased in 2002 as Tractors Christmas.

== Artwork ==
The album's artwork has the background of a wrapped Christmas present. It features red stripes on the front and back and wrapping is beige and also features an oval with a picture of a tractor. The CD shows a black-and-white picture of Santa Claus.

== Track listing ==
No.	Title	Writer(s)	Length
1.	"Santa Claus Is Coming to Town"	John Frederick Coots, Haven Gillespie	3:44
2.	"Jingle My Bells"	Walt Richmond	2:44
3.	"The Shelter"	Wiley Hunt	3:36
4.	"Rockin' This Christmas"	Richmond, Steve Ripley, Rick Robbins, Jim Sweney	3:47
5.	"Santa Looked a Lot Like Daddy"	Buck Owens, Don Rich	2:35
6.	"Christmas Is Comin'"	Casey VanBeek	3:59
7.	"Santa Claus Is Comin' (In a Boogie Woogie Choo Choo Train)"	Richmond, Ripley	3:57
8.	"Baby Wanna Be by You"	VanBeek	3:30
9.	"Swingin' Home for Christmas"	Ripley	3:13
10.	"White Christmas" (Instrumental)	Irving Berlin	2:02
11.	"The Santa Claus Boogie"	Ripley	3:51
12.	"Silent Night, Christmas Blue"	arrangement of Silent Night with additional lyrics by Ripley & Richmond	3:40

== Charts ==
=== Weekly charts ===
Chart (1995)	Peak position
US Billboard 200	68
US Top Country Albums (Billboard)	12

=== Year-end charts ===
Chart (1996)	Position
US Top Country Albums (Billboard)	58
