= Junior Markham =

James Keys Markham
- Born: March 16, 1941; Pryor, Oklahoma, U.S.
- Died: September 21, 2018 (aged 77)
- Genres: Blues, country, blues rock, Tulsa sound
- Occupation(s): Musician, songwriter
- Instrument(s): Harmonica, vocals
- Years active: 1957–2018
- Labels: Kingsnake Records, Alligator Records, Arista Records, Tulsa Blues Project Records

James Keys Markham (March 16, 1941 – September 21, 2018) was an American harmonica player and singer. Inducted into both the Oklahoma Blues Hall of Fame and the Oklahoma Jazz Hall of Fame, he is considered a pioneer of the "Tulsa sound".

== Early life ==
James Keys Markham was born and raised in Pryor, Oklahoma. His parents were Elisabeth and James Clarence Markham. Markham never completed high school, but dropped out. Markham listened to blues radio and records of Roy Orbison and Elvis Presley. In 1956, as a teenager, he got the chance to see his idol play at the Expo Square Pavilion at the Tulsa State Fair. Markham remembered it as the day that "Ruined my life". Markham even got the chance to meet Presley: "I walked back in there and looked up and there’s Elvis Presley. I visited with him. He wanted to know where the bathroom was, and we went to the bathroom. Actually, his first words were, 'Do you know where a guy can take a piss around here?' I said, 'Yeah, follow me'." Markham spent much of his childhood on the North side of Tulsa going into clubs underage with a note from his parents, which allowed him to see B.B. King, Billie Holiday, Ray Charles, Little Richard, and Jackie Wilson.

== Career ==
After being convinced by his friend Leon Russell, Markham left Tulsa in the early 1960s for Los Angeles. Drummer David Teegarden would later join them about 6 months after Markham and Russell were out there. They all lived in the same house. During this time, Markham was a trumpet player. He played trumpet since he was in grade school in Chouteau, Oklahoma. Markham got a recording contract for Capitol Records. This is where Markham met Gram Parsons from The Flying Burrito Brothers and became a regular opener for them. Markham also met Bobby Keys, The Rolling Stones keyboardist and saxophonist. These tapes from Capitol are assumed to be lost. While out on tour in 1962, a drummer named Bill Boatman told Markham that he should learn to play the harmonica to go along with Jimmy Reed songs the band was covering. Markham returned to Tulsa in 1969.

In 2013, Markham and his band at the time, The Governor's Blues Revue, opened for B.B. King in Texarkana, Texas. Markham also ran a club called the Paradise Club. It was located at 6200 South Lewis Avenue in Tulsa. After he closed the club, he opened a restaurant called Jimmy's Bar-B-Que.

== Music ==
Markham has credits on a vast array of recordings ranging from The Tractors' self titled album to A.C. Reed's album I'm in the Wrong Business. Markham did two 45s in his band Junior Markham and the Tulsa Review in 1965. These recordings feature Carl Radle, Jesse Ed Davis, Levon Helm, and others. Markham has two solo albums out to date. The first one was released on September 7, 1999, on King Snake Records called Wound Up Tight. This album features Leon Russell on keys as well as King Snake artists Ace Moreland (a guitar player who is also considered a Tulsa musician even though he is from Miami, Oklahoma) and Bob "Rattlesnake" Greenlee who produced the album. At the time of that album's release, King Snake had signed a new distribution deal with a company out of Florida. The distribution company had been shipping drugs in CD cases all over the world which meant that King Snake products could not be distributed. Markham's second album is called Get Ya Head Right and was released in 2018 on Tulsa Blues Project Records. The album features Bobby Keys, Johnny Sansone, Marcy Levy, Walt Richmond, and Charles Tuberville

Markham was inducted into both the Oklahoma Blues Hall of Fame and the Oklahoma Jazz Hall of Fame.

== House fire ==
In the morning on May 7, 2018, Markham's house caught on fire, although he was not at his property and was said to be fine. The fire was caused by an electrical problem. Markham had no insurance on his house and he lost belongings and personal memorabilia.

== Death ==
On September 21, 2018, Markham died; he was 78 years old.

== Discography ==
- 1967 – The Leathercoated Minds – A Trip Down The Sunset Strip
- 1968 – Asylum Choir – Look Inside The Asylum Choir
- 1984 – .38 Special (band) – Tour de Force
- 1987 – A.C. Reed – I'm in the Wrong Business (Plays on the same track Bonnie Raitt does)
- 1994 – The Tractors – The Tractors
- 1995 – David Olney – High, Wide And Lonesome
- 1995 – Various – Even More Good Whiskey: A Collection Of Contemporary Blues Songs From The State Of Tennessee (Made in Germany)
- 1998 – Various – Blues on the High Seas: King Snake LIVE! (with Ace Moreland, Floyd Miles, and Sonny Rhodes)
- 1998 – Brad Absher – Find You Tonight
- 1999 – Jimmy Markham – Wound Up Tight
- 2004 – JJ Cale – To Tulsa And Back
- 2007 – Red Dirt Rangers – Ranger Motel
- 2009 – JJ Cale – Roll On
- 2009 – Little Joe McLerran – Believe I'll Make A Change
- 2014 – Eric Clapton & Friends – The Breeze: An Appreciation of JJ Cale
- 2017 – Scott Ellison – Good Morning Midnight
- 2018 – Jimmy Markham – Get Ya Head Right
