= The Tractors (album) =

Studio album by the Tractors
- Released: August 2, 1994
- Genre: Country
- Length: 47:19
- Label: Arista
- Producer: Steve Ripley, Walt Richmond

The Tractors chronology
The Tractors (1994)	Have Yourself a Tractors Christmas (1995)

Singles from The Tractors
- 1. "Baby Likes to Rock It" Released: August 22, 1994

Professional ratings
Review scores
Source	Rating
AllMusic	4.5/5 stars
Entertainment Weekly	A

The Tractors is the debut studio album by American country music band the Tractors. Released in August 1994 on Arista Records, it set a record for becoming the fastest-selling debut album by a group to achieve Recording Industry Association of America platinum certification in the United States; by the end of the year, it was certified double platinum, and became the highest-selling country album of 1994. The tracks "Baby Likes to Rock It", "Tryin' to Get to New Orleans", and "Badly Bent" were all released as singles. "Baby Likes to Rock It" was the only one to reach the top 40, peaking at number 11 on Hot Country Songs.

== Recording the album ==
Steve Ripley, the Tractors' lead vocalist and guitarist, co-produced and recorded the album along with keyboardist/bass vocalist Walt Richmond at The Church Studio in Tulsa, Oklahoma.

== Track listing ==
No.	Title	Writer(s)	Length
1.	"The Tulsa Shuffle"	Steve Ripley	3:54
2.	"Fallin' Apart"	Ripley, Ron Getman	3:47
3.	"Thirty Days"	Chuck Berry	2:45
4.	"I've Had Enough"	Ripley	3:10
5.	"The Little Man"	Jim Pulte, Ripley, Tim DuBois	5:46
6.	"Baby Likes to Rock It"	Ripley, Walt Richmond	3:56
7.	"Badly Bent"	Ripley, Richmond, Martha Ellis	3:02
8.	"The Blue Collar Rock"	Ripley	4:34
9.	"Doreen"	Ripley	2:29
10.	"Settin' the Woods on Fire"	Fred Rose, Ed G. Nelson	2:55
11.	"Tryin' to Get to New Orleans"	Ripley, Richmond, DuBois	4:40
12.	"The Tulsa Shuffle (Revisited)"	Ripley	6:11

== Personnel ==
=== The Tractors ===
- Ron Getman – electric guitar, acoustic guitar, slide guitar, steel guitar, Dobro, mandolin, high harmony vocals
- Jamie Oldaker – drums, "groove snares", tambourine, percussion
- Walt Richmond – Steinway piano, Hammond B-3 organ, accordion, Wurlitzer, clavinet, drums, horns, bass vocals
- Steve Ripley – electric guitar, drums, lead vocals
- Casey van Beek – bass guitar, low harmony vocals

=== Additional musicians ===
"The Tulsa Shuffle"

- J. J. Cale – guitar
- Joe Davis – saxophones
- Jim Keltner – drums
- Glen Mitchell – Hammond B-3 organ
- Bonnie Raitt – slide guitar
- Angelene Ripley – Hammond B-3 organ
- Elvis Ripley – tremolo guitar
- Leon Russell – synthesizer

"Fallin' Apart"

- Ed Richmond – fiddle

"Thirty Days"

- Debbie Campbell – background vocals
- John Crowder – background vocals
- Joe Davis – saxophones
- Ron Morgan – upright bass on intro
- Jim Sweney – background vocals

"I've Had Enough"

- Steve Collier – steel guitar
- Gene Crownaver – steel guitar
- Curly Lewis – fiddles
- Waddy Pass – steel guitar

"The Little Man"

- Rick Morton – fiddle
- Jim Pulte – bass vocals
- Bonnie Raitt – slide guitar
- Angelene Ripley – Hammond B-3 organ
- Elvis Ripley – tremolo guitar

"Baby Likes to Rock It"

- James Burton – "Master of the Telecaster"

"Badly Bent"

- Steve Bagsby – steel guitar
- Curly Lewis – fiddle

"The Blue Collar Rock"

- Ry Cooder – slide guitar
- Jim Keltner – additional drums

"Doreen"

- Eldon Shamblin – guitar

"Settin' the Woods on Fire"

None

"Tryin' to Get to New Orleans"

- Joe Davis – horns

"The Tulsa Shuffle (Revisited)"

- Junior Markham & the Tulsa All-Stars
  - Junior Markham – harmonica
  - Jimmy Karstein – drums
  - Chuck Blackwell – drums
  - Chuck Browning – drums
  - David Teegarden – drums
  - Steve Hickerson – guitar
  - Tommy Tripplehorn – guitar
- Glen Mitchell, Larry Bell, Carl Bickhardt, Dick Sims, Angelene Ripley, Ed Robinson – Hammond B-3 organs
- Steve Allen, Rick Beilke, Mike Bruce, Mark Bruner, Jim Byfield, Robert Coggins, Jon Crowder, Gary Cundiff, Jim Edwards, Richard Feldman, Huey Flannery, Ron Flynt, Michael Garrett, Gary Gilmore, Doc James, Roger Linn, Steve Pryor, Jim Pulte, Gordon Shryock, "Skee", Roger Tillison, Don White – guitars
- Chuck DeWalt, Bill Belknap, Rich Brown, Jim Keltner – additional drums
- Stacey Grant – trombone
- Danny Mayo – "life observations and noises"
- Ron Morgan – bass guitar riffs
- Bonnie Raitt – slide guitar
- Charlene Ripley – trumpet
- Pat "Taco" Ryan – saxophone
- Leon Russell – MIDI
- Jim Strader – bass guitar licks
- Spencer Sutton – piano

=== Additional production and engineering ===
- Don Cobb – digital editing
- Ron Getman – engineering
- Maude Gilman – art direction
- Carlos Grier – digital editing
- Señor McGuire – photography
- Denny Purcell – mastering
- Walt Richmond – production, engineering, photography
- Angelene Ripley – engineering
- Elvis Ripley – engineering
- Steve Ripley – production, engineering, design, original art

== Charts ==
=== Weekly charts ===
Chart (1994–1995)	Peak position
Canadian Albums (RPM)	36
Canadian Country Albums (RPM)	1
US Billboard 200	19
US Top Country Albums (Billboard)	2
US Heatseekers Albums (Billboard)	1

=== Year-end charts ===
Chart (1994)	Position
US Top Country Albums (Billboard)	57
Chart (1995)	Position
US Billboard 200	64
US Top Country Albums (Billboard)	7
