= Baby Likes to Rock It =

Single by The Tractors

from the album The Tractors
- B-side: "Tulsa Shuffle"
- Released: August 22, 1994
- Genre: Country rock, rockabilly
- Length: 3:56
- Label: Arista
- Songwriters: Steve Ripley, Walt Richmond
- Producers: Steve Ripley, Walt Richmond

The Tractors singles chronology
"Baby Likes to Rock It" (1994)	"Tryin' to Get to New Orleans" (1995)

Music video
- "Baby Likes to Rock It" on YouTube

"Baby Likes to Rock It" is a song written by Steve Ripley and Walt Richmond, and recorded by American country music group The Tractors. It was released in August 1994 as the first single from their self-titled album. The song reached number 11 on the Billboard Hot Country Singles & Tracks chart and peaked at number 8 on the RPM Country Tracks chart in Canada. It is their only Top 40 country hit to date, making the band a one-hit wonder.

The song was rewritten as "Santa Claus Is Comin' (In a Boogie Woogie Choo Choo Train)" on the 1995 album Have Yourself a Tractors Christmas.

== Music video ==
The music video, which features photo name checks for Jimmy Swaggart and Jerry Lee Lewis, was directed by Michael Salomon and premiered in late 1994. The video won Music Video of the Year at the Country Music Association Awards in 1995.

== Awards ==
In 1995 The Tractors were nominated for a Grammy Award for Best Country Performance by a Duo or Group with Vocal for their performance of "Baby Likes to Rock It."

== Chart performance ==
=== "Baby Likes to Rock It" ===
Chart (1994)	Peak position
Canada Country Singles (RPM)	8
US Hot Country Songs (Billboard)	11

=== "Santa Claus Is Comin' (In a Boogie Woogie Choo Choo Train)" ===
Chart (1995–96)	Peak position
US Hot Country Songs (Billboard)	43
Chart (1998–99)	Peak position
US Hot Country Songs (Billboard)	65
