= Leslie Lemke =

American musician savant

- Born: January 31, 1952 (age 74); Milwaukee, Wisconsin, US
- Origin: Fond du Lac, Wisconsin, US
- Occupation: Musician
- Instruments: Piano, singing, numerous others
- Years active: 1980–present

Leslie Lemke (American English: /ˈlɛzli ˈlɛmki/; born January 31, 1952) is a blind American savant who is most notable for his work as a musician. Blind after a surgery, Lemke remained under constant supervision and unable to walk until he was 16, when he randomly began to play the piano at a perfect level, in total darkness with no prior teaching and by himself, leading him to be regarded as a child prodigy.

== Biography ==
Leslie Lemke was born prematurely in Milwaukee, Wisconsin, in 1952. As a complication of his premature birth, he developed retinal problems, then glaucoma, and his eyes had to be surgically removed in the first months of life. He also had brain damage that caused cerebral palsy and severe intellectual disability. His birth mother gave him up for adoption, and the county asked May Lemke, a nurse-governess, if she would take Lemke into her receiving home. He was 12 before he learned to stand, and 15 before he learned to walk.

Though social services had warned May Lemke that Leslie was likely to die, she maintained that he would not die under her care. To feed him, May sometimes placed cereal on his tongue and stroked his throat to encourage him to swallow. It was a year before Leslie could chew food on his own. It took years of constant care before this changed. During this time, he could sing somewhat and repeat some phrases, but was not conversant, and was distant and unemotional. He could repeat verbatim and in the exact tone what he had heard, including, "Foster mother has done well, but the time will come when institutional placement will be necessary." To teach him to walk, the approximately four and a half foot May devised a strap system by which Leslie could be supported while he walked with her.

When Leslie was 7, Joe and May Lemke obtained a piano for him, with May placing her hands over his to play some simple tunes. Soon Leslie was playing these tunes on the piano and used other instruments such as drums, accordion, and chord organ. Even though his spasticity was so severe that he could not hold eating utensils, this handicap disappeared when playing the piano. By age 12 Leslie was playing the piano and singing songs he had heard for hours on end. Though he had not often heard classical music, when he was about 16, his foster parents awoke in the middle of the night to Leslie flawlessly playing Tchaikovsky's Piano Concerto no. 1, which he had heard on television that night. Leslie was soon playing all styles of music, from ragtime to classical.

Leslie could remember and play back a musical piece of any length flawlessly after hearing it once. Among the many songs he was estimated to know, two that he often sang were the Christian hymns "How Great Thou Art" and "Amazing Grace". As time went on, Leslie became more verbal and more musically accomplished, and increasingly creative and witty. After playing back a musical piece he had heard, he sometimes launched into an improvisation of it. He was known to have composed songs on the spot, singing with a baritone voice. His verbal IQ is 58.

By 1980, Leslie was regularly giving concerts in Fond du Lac, Wisconsin. His newfound fame gained him invitations to television shows such as CBC's Man Alive, the CBS Evening News, 60 Minutes, and That's Incredible! In 1983, ABC broadcast The Woman Who Willed a Miracle, a drama about Leslie and his adoptive mother. It starred Cloris Leachman as May Lemke. Leslie is also the subject of Fred Small's song, "Leslie is Different" and makes a short appearance in Michael Vey 4.

Leslie has toured the United States, Scandinavia, and Japan, and has given free concerts on occasion.

His adoptive mother May Lemke developed Alzheimer's disease and died on November 6, 1993. As of 2014, Leslie lived with Mary Parker, May’s daughter, in Arpin, Wisconsin. His verbal skills continued to improve, and he still performed concerts as well as creating improvised musical pieces.

== See also ==
- Derek Paravicini
- Tony DeBlois
- Hikari Ōe
- Kim Peek
