= Claiborne Cary =

American actress (1932–2010)

- Born: Claiborne Leachman; February 17, 1932; Lone Tree, Iowa, U.S.
- Died: March 20, 2010 (aged 78); Costa Mesa, California, U.S.
- Occupation(s): Actress, cabaret performer
- Years active: 1956–2000s
- Notable work: Silk Stockings, The New Girl in Town, Hellzapoppin '67
- Spouse: Charles Northrop (m. 1967)
- Children: 1
- Relatives: Cloris Leachman (sister)

Claiborne Cary (born Claiborne Leachman; February 17, 1932 – March 20, 2010) was an American actress and cabaret performer.

== Early life and education ==
Cary was born Claiborne Leachman in Lone Tree, Iowa, the daughter of Cloris (née Wallace) and Berkeley Claiborne "Buck" Leachman, who worked at the family-owned Leachman Lumber Company. She was raised in Des Moines, Iowa. The younger sister of actress Cloris Leachman, Cary began dancing and performing at a young age. Cary's maternal grandmother was of Bohemian (Czech) descent. She attended both the University of Iowa and Northwestern University before moving to Manhattan to pursue an acting career in the 1950s.

== Career ==
Cary made her Broadway theater debut in Silk Stockings in 1956, later touring with the production's national tour with actor, Don Ameche. In 1957, with the support of choreographer Bob Fosse and despite the objections of director George Abbott, she appeared opposite Gwen Verdon and Thelma Ritter in New Girl in Town at the 46th Street Theater on Broadway. Her many other Broadway credits included The Supporting Cast, and the musical Beg, Borrow or Steal (opposite Betty Garrett and Eddie Bracken). Her Off-Broadway resume included roles in Kukla, Burr and Ollie, Smiling, the Boy Fell Dead, Faith, Hope and Charity and All Kinds of Giants. She was featured in "Hellazpoppin' 67" which tried out at the Montreal Expo in Canada but never made it to Broadway.

She also appeared in television, including Law & Order, The Dick Van Dyke Show and Young Dr. Kildare. She appeared in numerous television commercials. She began, however, to focus more on cabaret productions and regional theater following the birth of her son, Berkeley Northrop. Within cabaret, she starred in and produced Grand Slam with Murray Grand. She also toured with the stage adaptation of Midnight in the Garden of Good and Evil. In 1987, she performed at Jan Wallman's in New York City in what a reviewer for The New York Times described as "the kind of brilliant cabaret act that does not happen overnight."

Cary's cabaret performances led to her twice winning MAC Awards, presented by the Manhattan Association of Cabarets & Clubs as "the New York cabaret scene's top honor".

Her lengthy regional theater credits included Ballroom, in which she appeared in Long Beach, California, with Charles Durning and Tyne Daly. She recorded and released two albums on CD, Miss Claiborne Cary Live and Now and Then. Her last public performance was in a cabaret in the early 2000s.

== Death ==
She died from complications of Parkinson's disease in Costa Mesa, California, on March 20, 2010, at the age of 78.
