= Heart of Mine (Bob Dylan song) =

Single by Bob Dylan

from the album Shot of Love
- B-side: "Let It Be Me" (Europe); "The Groom's Still Waiting at the Altar" (USA)
- Released: July 1981 (Europe); September 1981 (USA)
- Recorded: May 15, 1981
- Genre: Pop; reggae
- Length: 4:32 (album version); 3:30 (single version)
- Label: Columbia
- Songwriter: Bob Dylan
- Producers: Chuck Plotkin; Bob Dylan

Bob Dylan singles chronology
"Saved" (1980)	"Heart of Mine" (1981)	"Dead Man, Dead Man" (1981)

Audio sample
- file; help

"Heart of Mine" is a song by Bob Dylan that appeared on his 1981 album Shot of Love. Recorded on May 15, 1981, it was released as a single, and reached No. 8 in Norway. A live version of the composition was released on Biograph in 1985.

Artists who have covered the song include Norah Jones, Mountain, Steve Gibbons, Blake Mills, Maria Muldaur, and Ulf Lundell.

== Recording ==
The music of "Heart of Mine" has been described as having a "loose, garagey" feel encompassing a "vaguely Latin/Caribbean vibe", and featuring "loosey-goosey piano" by Dylan. Dylan's piano playing has also been described as "honky-tonk".

== Personnel ==
- Bob Dylan - vocals, piano
- Ringo Starr – drums
- Ronnie Wood – guitar
- Donald "Duck" Dunn – bass
- Clydie King - vocals

== Release ==
In Europe, "Heart of Mine" was released as a single in July 1981, at a length of 3:30 (compared with 4:32 for the album version). The B-side was "Let It Be Me", written by M. Curtis, P. Delanoe, and G. Becaud. Dylan had released a different version of the song on his 1970 album Self Portrait, but the non-album B-side of "Heart of Mine" was newly recorded during the Shot of Love sessions. As a single, "Heart of Mine" reached No. 8 in Norway, and spent six weeks in the Norwegian Top 10. "Heart of Mine" was released on Shot of Love in August 1981.

In the United States, the single was released in September 1981, with "The Groom's Still Waiting at the Altar" as the B-side. "The Groom's Still Waiting at the Altar" originally did not appear on the Shot of Love album; it first appeared on Biograph in 1985, but was later added to subsequent releases of Shot of Love. Also on Biograph, Dylan included a live version of "Heart of Mine", recorded on November 10, 1981, in New Orleans, Louisiana.

== Reception ==
Record World said that Dylan's "rollicking piano and nasal vocal are dazzling." Writer Jeff Perkins describes "Heart of Mine" as a highlight of Shot of Love. Critic Sean Egan calls the song "sweet and vulnerable", but considers the live version on Biograph "immediately superior", due to the "suffocatingly bad production" on Shot of Love. Bill Janovitz of Allmusic considers the Shot of Love version to have a "good feel", characteristic of the "warm and natural" sound of the album as a whole, and describes the lyrics as "clever". Clinton Heylin, by contrast, writes that "the song... rambles from cliché to cliché", giving the examples of "If you can't do the time, don't do the crime" and "Give her an inch and she'll take a mile". Heylin describes the take used on Shot of Love as "half-assed" and "ill-conceived"; he believes Dylan should have instead released a version recorded in April 1981 that is "more engaging" and "pop-friendly".

== Covers ==
Norah Jones and Peter Malick recorded the song for their 2003 album New York City and which featured in the 2003 film Runaway Jury being used in the closing credits. Mountain included the song on their Dylan cover album, Masters of War, and Steve Gibbons on his Dylan Project 2. Maria Muldaur likewise released the song on her Dylan cover album, Heart of Mine: Love Songs of Bob Dylan, as well as recording a live version for her CD and DVD Live in Concert. Danielle Haim and Blake Mills covered the song on Chimes of Freedom: Songs of Bob Dylan Honoring 50 Years of Amnesty International. Ulf Lundell released a version in Swedish entitled "Hjärtat mitt" on his 1984 album Sweethearts, and a concert version on Maria Kom Tillbaka: Live.

== Charts ==
Chart (1981)	Peak position
Norwegian Charts	8
