= Shot of Love =

Studio album by Bob Dylan
- Released: August 12, 1981
- Recorded: March–May 1981
- Genres: Christian rock; gospel
- Length: 44:27
- Label: Columbia
- Producers: Chuck Plotkin; Bob Dylan; Bumps Blackwell

Bob Dylan chronology
Saved (1980)	Shot of Love (1981)	Infidels (1983)

Singles from Shot of Love
- 1. "Heart of Mine" Released: September 1981

Shot of Love is the twenty-first studio album by American singer-songwriter Bob Dylan, released on August 12, 1981, by Columbia Records. It is considered to be Dylan's last of a trilogy of Christian albums.

At the time of its release, Shot of Love received mixed reviews; Paul Nelson of Rolling Stone criticized the album, though he did single out the last track, "Every Grain of Sand", as a standout. Shot of Love, while reaching UK No. 6, selling more than 60,000 copies, continued Dylan's US commercial decline, reaching No. 33 and selling around 300,000 copies, during a brief chart stay. Bono of Irish band U2 described Shot of Love as one of his favorites, particularly due to Dylan's singing ability.

== Recording sessions ==
Throughout 1980, Dylan was still focused on religious-oriented music in what was dubbed his 'Born Again' period that was marked by prolific songwriting. It continued through the summer, when Dylan began work on his follow-up album to Saved. "Property of Jesus", "Yonder Comes Sin", and new arrangements of older material like "Ain't Gonna Go to Hell (For Anybody)" were composed during this time, as were "Caribbean Wind" and "The Groom's Still Waiting at the Altar", which "contrast[ed] his troubled sexual relations with the demands of a higher calling", according to Dylan biographer Clinton Heylin.

Then, sometime in mid-September, Dylan reassembled his standing band at Rundown Studios in Santa Monica, California, where they recorded a number of his new songs, including "Every Grain of Sand". A rough recording of "Every Grain of Sand" dating from this period was eventually released on The Bootleg Series Volumes 1–3 (Rare & Unreleased) 1961–1991.

Dylan embarked on a tour in November and December 1980, before returning to his songwriting. In March 1981, Dylan held more informal sessions at both Rundown and Studio 55, rehearsing some of his new compositions while auditioning a potential producer, Jimmy Iovine. These sessions focused on the song "Caribbean Wind", an ambitious work that had been performed live once during November. Already generating interest in the rock press, "Caribbean Wind" was seen as a potential centerpiece for his upcoming album, but it was not quite considered finished. Numerous attempts at recording "Caribbean Wind" during the Iovine sessions proved disappointing, with Dylan growing increasingly pessimistic about the song's prospects. "Angelina" was recorded with much greater success, and Dylan was satisfied enough to mark it for inclusion.

In the meantime, Dylan concluded that another producer was needed, but after relieving Iovine of his duties, Dylan struggled to find an appropriate producer, as well as an appropriate studio. Various sessions were booked across Los Angeles, including sessions at Cream Studios and United Western Studios. None of these places provided the sound Dylan had in mind but had difficulty creating. The sessions did provide an opportunity to rehearse new compositions, including "In the Summertime", as well as experiment with new ideas.

Dylan resigned himself to Rundown, where he and his band worked through his songs over a period of several weeks. Sometime in late April, veteran producer Bumps Blackwell stopped by to see Dylan. Blackwell was best known for producing Little Richard's most celebrated recordings, and though the purpose of his visit remains unclear, Blackwell ultimately produced that day's session, supervising recordings of "Trouble", "Magic" and "Shot of Love" that were later selected for the album. The experience gave Dylan an enormous amount of satisfaction, as he would later reveal in subsequent interviews, but Blackwell did not return for further work, possibly because of health issues.

Chuck Plotkin, who had experience working with Bruce Springsteen, was eventually hired by Dylan on the suggestion of a friend, Debbie Gold. Five sessions were scheduled for Plotkin's Clover Studio, beginning on April 27 and ending on May 1, and work proceeded on songs like "Property of Jesus", "Watered-Down Love", "Heart of Mine", "Lenny Bruce", "Dead Man, Dead Man", "In the Summertime", and "Every Grain of Sand", all of which received usable takes that were marked for the album. An extensively rewritten and rearranged version of "Caribbean Wind" was also recorded at Clover, but once again, Dylan was disappointed with the results; it was ultimately set aside for an indefinite amount of time.

On May 12, Dylan and Plotkin sequenced a preliminary version of Shot of Love, but after listening to it the following day, Dylan decided to remove "Angelina" and "Magic" from the final sequence. The remaining nine songs were retained, but Dylan decided to re-record several of those songs. Three re-recordings were eventually used for the final sequence: "Trouble", "Dead Man, Dead Man", and "Heart of Mine", all of which were taped two to three days after the preliminary sequence was approved.

The mixing process proved rather tense as Plotkin and Dylan had conflicting ideas on how to mix the songs. Plotkin made numerous prototype mixes, delivering each one on cassette dub over to Dylan at Rundown Studios. Most, if not all of them, were rejected. "Chuck [wanted] to get a nice mix at the end of each song", recalls Jim Keltner, "and Bob wouldn't have any of the nice mixes. Most everything you hear on that Shot of Love album turns out to be the monitor mixes." Plotkin spent another month mixing and overdubbing over the nine songs selected for Shot of Love. Mixing was finally completed on June 7, with overdubbing continuing through June 16.

== Songs ==
Unlike Dylan's previous studio album Saved, Shot of Love included more secular material as well as overtly religious and evangelistic songs.

The opening title track of Shot of Love makes a few spiritual references while railing against substance abuse.

"The purpose of music is to elevate and inspire the spirit", Dylan said in a 1983 interview with NME. "To those who care where Bob Dylan is at, they should listen to "Shot of Love". It's my most perfect song. It defines where I am spiritually, musically, romantically and whatever else. It shows where my sympathies lie. It's all there in that one song." Produced by Bumps Blackwell, it's the only Blackwell production featured on Shot of Love.

The second track on Shot of Love fits, again, somewhere between in secular and religious territory. A slight but jaunty, Tex-Mex number, "Heart of Mine" is a love song, Dylan's first in several years, but it is founded on Jeremiah 17:9, "The heart is deceitful above all things, and desperately wicked: who can know it?" Instead of singing to a person of interest, the narrator addresses his own "heart", trying to tame his own impulses and emotions in fear of getting hurt.

An earlier performance was already selected for use when Dylan decided to re-record "Heart of Mine" with Ronnie Wood and Ringo Starr. In an interview taken in 1984, Dylan admitted that "Heart of Mine" was "done a bunch of different ways ... but I chose for some reason a particularly funky version of that—and it's really scattered. It's not as good as some of the other versions, but I chose it because Ringo and Ronnie Wood played on it, and we did it in like ten minutes." A live version from August 1981 is included on the Biograph compilation. The original version of "Heart of Mine" remains available only on bootlegs.

Continuing the evangelism of Slow Train Coming and Saved, "Property of Jesus" is another one of Dylan's sharp put-down songs, this time aimed at non-believers who sneer at the Christian faithful.

The fourth track, "Lenny Bruce", is about the subversive Jewish comedian of that name. An influential entertainer whose use of provocative language led to a famous obscenity trial, Bruce died of a drug overdose in 1966. Despite the secular tone of the lyrics, the music is "anchored in the resolute cadences of piano gospel", according to music critic Tim Riley. Often regarded as a bizarre tribute, the song portrays Bruce as some kind of martyr, even though its characterizations of Bruce have been described as peculiar and almost non-descript. When Dave Herman asked why, after so many years, Dylan chose to write a song about Lenny Bruce, he answered, "You know, I have no idea! I wrote that song in five minutes! I found it was a little strange after he died, that people made such a hero out of him. When he was alive he couldn't even get a break. And certainly now, comedy is rank, dirty and vulgar and very unfunny and stupid, wishy-washy and the whole thing. ... But he was doing this same sort of thing many years ago and maybe some people aren't realizing that there was Lenny Bruce, who did this before and that is what happened to him. So these people can *do* what they're doing now. I don't know."

The first verse might, in fact, be seen to offer a subtle cut to Bruce's imitators for whom the use of profanity is a cheap "shock" gimmick, while for Bruce it was a strike for free speech: "He was an outlaw, that's for sure/More of an outlaw than you ever were."

When Shot of Love was reissued for compact disc, "The Groom's Still Waiting at the Altar" was added into the album sequence. Recorded during the Shot of Love sessions, it was originally issued as a B-side to the 45 rpm release of "Heart of Mine". Throughout the song, Dylan sings of a theological schism that ultimately separates the narrator and a woman, whom he addresses as 'Claudette.' The term 'groom' is used or implied in the Bible and in Christian theology. In this context, Jesus Christ is the Bridegroom to the Church, the Bride of Christ. Widely praised and heavily played on progressive radio, Riley called it "a generous return to slow-burning defiance that restores not only the lust to Dylan's heart, but the power to his voice." Together with "Caribbean Wind" (an outtake discussed below), "The Groom's Still Waiting at the Altar" marked a dramatic change in lyrical direction, one Dylan would continue to follow in his next album, Infidels.

"Watered-Down Love" is Dylan's version of 1 Corinthians 13, describing "love that's pure", and lamenting that pure love is not what many people want.

The reggae-tinged "Dead Man, Dead Man" is another evangelical song. As Greil Marcus writes in Salon.com, it "is a textbook warning against the devil, if you listen as if you're reading; if you hear it, it's a poker game, and the singer's winning." But, actually, the song's theme is Romans 7:24 "O wretched man that I am! who shall deliver me from the body of this death?", and "dead man" that Dylan is addressing is himself, admitting his moral fallibility and mocking his own appearance "Satan's got you by the heel/There's a bird's nest in your hair."

A song based in wistful retrospection, "In the Summertime" is one of the more relaxed, upbeat songs on the album. Paul Nelson of Rolling Stone opined that "In the Summertime" has "a lovely feel to it, and Dylan's harmonica playing hangs in the air like the scent of mimosa."

"Trouble" is a blues song about how tribulation is intrinsic to human existence.

In recent years, some critics have grown to appreciate Shot of Love while others continue to disparage it. If there is any critical consensus, it's to be found on the closing track. Marked by an ethereal quality that is not found elsewhere on Shot of Love, "Every Grain of Sand" is one of Dylan's most celebrated recordings. In this song, Dylan puzzles over the dilemma of whether his disappointments, temptations, failings, and triumphs were due to his actions alone or ordained by God's delivering hand ("I've gone from rags to riches in the sorrows of the night/In the violence of a summer's dream/In the chill of a winter light" and "I hear the ancient footsteps like the motion of the sea/Sometimes I turn and there's someone there; sometimes it's only me").

It's "perhaps his most sublime work to date", writes Clinton Heylin, "the summation of a number of attempts to express what the promise of redemption meant to him personally. One of his most intensely personal songs, it also remains one of his most universal. Detailing 'the time of my confession/the hour of my deepest need,' the song marks the conclusion of his evangelical period as a songwriter, something its position at the conclusion of Shot of Love tacitly acknowledges." Paul Nelson called it "the 'Chimes of Freedom' and 'Mr. Tambourine Man' of Bob Dylan's Christian period ... it has surety and strength all down the line. Also vulnerability ... Dylan's beautifully idiosyncratic harmonica playing has metamorphosed into an archetype that pierces the heart and moistens the eye. And, for once, the lyrics don't let you down. The artist's Christianity is both palpable and comprehensible ... For a moment or two, he touches you, and the gates of heaven dissolve into a universality that has nothing to do with most of the LP."

Tim Riley described "Every Grain of Sand" as "a prayer that inhabits the same intuitive zone as "Blowin' in the Wind" - you'd swear it was a hymn passed down through the ages." Rock critic Milo Miles wrote, "This is the one Dylan song in ten years ... in which he examines a pop-culture paradox (that legendary stars in particular have to believe in ideals greater than themselves) more eloquently than any other performer has." When Bruce Springsteen inducted Dylan into the Rock 'n' Roll Hall of Fame on January 20, 1988, he would also cite "Every Grain of Sand" as an example of his best work.

== Response ==
Professional ratings
Review scores
Source	Rating
AllMusic	2/5 stars
Christgau's Record Guide	B−
The Encyclopedia of Popular Music	2/5 stars
Entertainment Weekly	B−
Q	3/5 stars
Rolling Stone	3.5/5 stars
The Rolling Stone Album Guide	2/5 stars
Tom Hull	B

A number of critics had already turned on Dylan for the evangelism of his previous two albums, but the reception for Shot of Love was particularly harsh. Despite lavishing praise on "Every Grain of Sand", Paul Nelson of Rolling Stone savaged the rest of the album. Nick Kent of New Musical Express called it "Dylan's worst album to date." Despite heavy touring in Europe and North America (in which all but two songs were performed), sales of Shot of Love were below CBS's expectations. Still, in an interview taken in 1983, Dylan would describe Shot of Love as a personal favorite.

Religion still held a strong place in Dylan's work, but as 1981 came to a close, his religious songs gave way to more secular material. During concerts in the summer of 1981, he covered Dave Mason's "We Just Disagree" and Dion's "Abraham, Martin & John". Some fans took the latter as a veiled ode to John Lennon, who was shot and killed the preceding winter, but in fact most of Dylan's performances of this song had been in the month immediately preceding Lennon's death, as a staple in the November–December 1980 US tour. Clinton Heylin notes, "Dylan was audibly coming to the end of this particular road."

The year 1982 began with personal tragedy when Dylan's close and longtime friend, Howard Alk, who most recently had contributed Shot of Love's informal back cover photo of Dylan admiring a rose, was found dead at Rundown Studios on New Year's Day. The coroner concluded he died of a heroin overdose. As Heylin reports, "recent months had seen the deaths of guitarist Michael Bloomfield and fellow Christian musician Keith Green", all of whom worked with Dylan, but Alk's death marked the end of an era. Dylan would soon dissolve his standing band, and he would not tour again until 1984. Sometime after June 1982, Dylan closed down Rundown Studios.

Shot of Love was the last album issued under a contract signed with CBS in 1978, but despite the decline in his commercial standing, Dylan was re-signed to another contract (a five-year, five-album deal) in July 1982.

Much of 1982 was relatively quiet in terms of musical activity. An album of duets was recorded with one of his background singers Clydie King at Gold Star Studios, but it would remain unreleased. At the time Dylan explained, "it doesn't fall into any category that [CBS] knows how to deal with."

However, the stage was set for his next album. Unlike his work on Shot of Love, his next batch of songs would not be auditioned on stage. As Dylan completed his new songs in private, much time would be spent in Minneapolis catching up with his eldest, 16-year-old son, Jesse; this involved frequenting performances of new wave and punk acts like The Clash, Elvis Costello, Squeeze, and X.

== Track listing ==
All tracks are written by Bob Dylan.

Side one
No.	Title	Length
1.	"Shot of Love"	4:18
2.	"Heart of Mine"	4:29
3.	"Property of Jesus"	4:33
4.	"Lenny Bruce"	4:32
5.	"Watered-Down Love"	4:10
Total length:		22:02

Side two
No.	Title	Length
1.	"The Groom's Still Waiting at the Altar"	4:04
2.	"Dead Man, Dead Man"	4:03
3.	"In the Summertime"	3:36
4.	"Trouble"	4:32
5.	"Every Grain of Sand"	6:12
Total length:		22:27

Note:

- "The Groom's Still Waiting at the Altar" was originally the B-side to the single "Heart of Mine" and was included on the cassette release but not the original vinyl album. It was later inserted onto the ten-track compact disc and reissues of the vinyl LP in 1985, and has been present in all subsequent pressings.

== Personnel ==
- Bob Dylan – guitar, harmonica, percussion, piano, keyboards, vocals, producer
- Carolyn Dennis – background vocals
- Steve Douglas – saxophone
- Tim Drummond, Donald Dunn – bass guitar
- Jim Keltner – drums
- Ringo Starr – drums on "Heart of Mine"
- Clydie King – background vocals
- Danny Kortchmar – electric guitar
- Regina McCrory – background vocals
- Carl Pickhardt – piano
- Madelyn Quebec – background vocals
- Steve Ripley, Fred Tackett – guitar
- Ronnie Wood – guitar on "Heart of Mine"
- William "Smitty" Smith – Hammond organ
- Benmont Tench – keyboards
- Monalisa Young – background vocals

Production

- Vic Anesini – compact disc mastering
- Dana Bisbee – assistant engineer
- Bumps Blackwell – producer
- Ken Perry – original LP mastering
- Chuck Plotkin – producer
- Toby Scott – engineer

== Certifications ==
Region	Certification	Certified units/sales
Australia (ARIA)	Gold	35,000^{^}
Spain (Promusicae)	Gold	50,000^{^}
United Kingdom (BPI)	Silver	60,000^{^}
^{^} Shipments figures based on certification alone.
