= The Tractors =

American country rock band

- A promotional image of The Tractors.

Background information
- Origin: Tulsa, Oklahoma, U.S.
- Genres: Country rock
- Years active: 1988–2018
- Labels: Arista Nashville, Audium, Boy Rocking
- Past members: Steve Ripley; Ron Getman; Jamie Oldaker; Walt Richmond; Casey van Beek
- Website: www.thetractors.com

The Tractors (formerly known as Uncle Steve & The Tractors) were an American country rock band composed of a loosely associated group of musicians headed by guitarist Steve Ripley. The original lineup consisted of Steve Ripley (lead vocals, guitar), Ron Getman (guitar, Dobro, mandolin, tenor vocals), Walt Richmond (keyboards, piano, bass vocals), Casey van Beek (bass guitar, baritone vocals), and Jamie Oldaker (drums). Under the band's original lineup, they signed to Arista Nashville in 1994, releasing their self-titled debut album that year; the album only produced one Top 40 hit on the Billboard country charts.

Since their foundation, most of the band's original members moved on to separate projects, although they often collaborated with frontman Ripley on The Tractors' more recent recordings. Ripley was the only official member of the group throughout its tenure; he had stated that The Tractors was more of a "state of mind", and the band contained a largely undefined cast of unofficial contributors.

== Biography ==
The Tractors were formed in 1988 by Steve Ripley. The original lineup comprised Ron Getman (electric guitar and slide guitar); Jamie Oldaker (drums); Walt Richmond (bass vocals, keyboards); Steve Ripley (guitar, lead vocals); and Casey Van Beek (bass guitar, baritone vocals). All five members had previously been backing musicians for other notable artists, including Bob Dylan, Eric Clapton, Bonnie Raitt, Linda Ronstadt, and Leonard Cohen. Oldaker had also played with Leon Russell, Peter Frampton, Ace Frehley, and Bob Seger.

By 1990, the group was signed to Arista Nashville, a newly formed record label based in Nashville, Tennessee and a subsidiary of Arista Records. In 1994, they released their self-titled debut album, which produced the single, "Baby Likes to Rock It," and soon became the fastest-selling debut album from a country group to reach platinum status. A Christmas album titled Have Yourself a Tractors Christmas soon followed.

The Tractors were nominated for two Grammy Awards and won the Country Weekly 1995 Golden Pick Award for Favorite New Group.

Their second album, Farmers in a Changing World, was released in 1998. The band's members, except for Ripley, soon departed for other projects, although they and Ripley remained close friends and made cameo appearances on subsequent albums. Ripley released the next Tractors album, Fast Girl, with several other musicians on Audium Entertainment in 2001. After Fast Girl, the Tractors left Audium and formed their own label, Boy Rocking Records. In 2009, the album, Trade Union, was released on the E1 label.

Three of the group's five original members have since died; Steve Ripley died at age 69 after a lengthy battle with cancer on January 3, 2019; Jamie Oldaker died at age 68 on July 16, 2020, also having succumbed to cancer; and Ron Getman died at age 71 on January 12, 2021, after a brief undisclosed illness. The two surviving members – Casey Van Beek and Walt Richmond – continue to be musically active, having formed a group named Casey Van Beek and the Tulsa Groove, and releasing an album titled Heaven Forever as recently as 2020; Getman was a brief contributor to this group before his own death.

== Sound ==
The Tractors achieved their distinctive sound in several ways, most notably from the use of old school 'minimal' recording techniques, and an emphasis on capturing everything in one take. Ripley often constructed guitars and cords for use in the band.

== Discography ==
=== Albums ===
Title	Album details	Peak chart positions				Certifications (sales thresholds)
Title	Album details	US Country	US	CAN Country	CAN	Certifications (sales thresholds)
The Tractors	Release date: August 2, 1994; Label: Arista Nashville	2	19	1	36	US: 2× Platinum; CAN: 2× Platinum
Have Yourself a Tractors Christmas^{[A]}	Release date: October 10, 1995; Label: Arista Nashville	12	68	—	—	
Farmers in a Changing World	Release date: November 3, 1998; Label: Arista Nashville	39	—	17	—	
Fast Girl	Release date: April 24, 2001; Label: Boy Rocking Records	65	—	—	—	
Big Night	Release date: October 8, 2002; Label: Boy Rocking Records	—	—	—	—	
The Kids Record	Release date: November 8, 2005; Label: Boy Rocking Records	—	—	—	—	
Trade Union	Release date: May 19, 2009; Label: E1 Entertainment	—	—	—	—	
"—" denotes releases that did not chart

Notes

- A Have Yourself a Tractors Christmas was re-released in 2002 as Tractors Christmas

=== Singles ===
Year	Single	Peak chart positions		Album
Year	Single	US Country	CAN Country	Album
1994	"Baby Likes to Rock It"	11	8	The Tractors
1995	"Tryin' to Get to New Orleans"	50	28	The Tractors
1995	"Badly Bent"	—	80	The Tractors
1998	"Shortenin' Bread"	57	61	Farmers in a Changing World
1998	"I Wouldn't Tell You No Lie"	72	—	Farmers in a Changing World
2001	"Can't Get Nowhere"	—	—	Fast Girl
2001	"The Big Night"	—	—	Fast Girl
2001	"Fast Girl"	—	—	Fast Girl
2002	"Ready to Cry"	—	—	Fast Girl
"—" denotes releases that did not chart

=== Other charted songs ===
Year	Single	Peak chart positions		Album
Year	Single	US Country	US	Album
1995	"The Santa Claus Boogie"	41	91	Have Yourself a Tractors Christmas
1995	"Santa Claus Is Comin' (In a Boogie Woogie Choo-Choo Train)"	43	—	Have Yourself a Tractors Christmas
1996	"The Santa Claus Boogie" (re-entry)	63	—	Have Yourself a Tractors Christmas
1997	"The Last Time"	75	—	Stone Country: Country Artists Perform the Songs of the Rolling Stones
1998	"Santa Claus Is Comin' (In a Boogie Woogie Choo-Choo Train)" (re-entry)	65	—	Have Yourself a Tractors Christmas
"—" denotes releases that did not chart

=== Music videos ===
Year	Video	Director
1994	"Baby Likes to Rock It"	Michael Salomon
1994	"The Santa Claus Boogie"	Michael McNamara
1995	"Tryin' to Get to New Orleans"	Michael Oblowitz
1995	"Badly Bent"	
1995	"Santa Claus Is Comin' (In a Boogie Woogie Choo-Choo Train)"	
1997	"The Last Time"	
1998	"Shortenin' Bread"	Michael Oblowitz
2001	"Can't Get Nowhere"	

== Awards and nominations ==
=== Grammy Awards ===
Year	Nominee / work	Award	Result
1995	"Baby Likes to Rock It"	Best Country Performance by a Duo or Group with Vocal	Nominated
1996	"Tryin' to Get to New Orleans"	Best Country Performance by a Duo or Group with Vocal	Nominated

=== Academy of Country Music Awards ===
Year	Nominee / work	Award	Result
1995	The Tractors	Top New Vocal Group or Duo	Nominated

=== Country Music Association Awards ===
Year	Nominee / work	Award	Result
1995	"Baby Likes to Rock It"	Single of the Year	Nominated
1995	"Baby Likes to Rock It"	Music Video of the Year	Won
