= Deportee (film) =

- Directed by: Sharron Miller
- Written by: Sharron Miller
- Produced by: Sharron Miller
- Starring: Andrew Stevens; Leslie Paxton; Sam Gilman
- Cinematography: Michael Scott
- Edited by: Sharron Miller
- Music by: Evan Tonsing; Song "Flying Upside Down in My Plane" by Steve Ripley
- Release date: 1976
- Running time: 24 minutes
- Country: United States
- Language: English

Deportee is a 1976 dramatic short film written, produced, directed and edited by Sharron Miller. It stars Andrew Stevens, Leslie Paxton, and Sam Gilman.

It was shot on location in downtown Los Angeles in 1975.

== Plot ==
Deportee tells the story of a young man and his alcoholic father who live in a skid-row hotel while trying to make ends meet. The father longs for the farm they left behind when they came to the city seeking a better life. The young man falls in love with a beautiful but troubled older woman who lives down the hall. Their bittersweet romance proves to be his painful rite-of-passage into adulthood.
