= The Woman Who Willed a Miracle =

- ABC Afterschool Special episode
- Episode no.: Season 11; Episode 5
- Directed by: Sharron Miller
- Written by: Arthur Heinemann
- Original air date: February 9, 1983

"The Woman Who Willed a Miracle" is a 1983 episode of the American television anthology series ABC Afterschool Special, starring Cloris Leachman, M. Emmet Walsh, Leif Green and Rosemary Murphy.

Dick Clark was the executive producer under the auspices of his company, Dick Clark Productions. It was produced by Preston Fischer, Sharron Miller, and Joanne Curley-Kerner, and was directed by Sharron Miller and written by Arthur Heinemann. It tells the extraordinary true story of Leslie Lemke, a blind, cognitively impaired boy with cerebral palsy who was raised from infancy by a foster mother who stubbornly refused to let him die. Because of her love and dedication, he not only survived but was discovered to be a musical savant.

The New York Times called it one of the most famous of all Afterschool Specials.

== Awards ==
- 1983 Emmy Awards for:
  - Best Children's Programming (Dick Clark, Preston Fischer, Sharron Miller, Joanne Curley-Kerner)
  - Best Director (Sharron Miller)
  - Best Writer (Arthur Heineman)
  - Outstanding Lead Actress (Cloris Leachman)
- 1983 Christopher Award
- 1983 Peabody Award
- 1984 Directors Guild of America Award (Sharron Miller)
