= Steve Ripley =

American country rock musician (1950–2019)

- Ripley in 2002

Background information
- Born: January 1, 1950; Boise, Idaho, U.S.
- Died: January 3, 2019 (aged 69) Pawnee, Oklahoma, U.S.
- Genres: country rock
- Occupations: Record producer, songwriter
- Instrument: Guitar
- Years active: 1972–2019
- Formerly of: The Tractors

Paul Steven Ripley (January 1, 1950 – January 3, 2019) was an American recording artist, record producer, songwriter, studio engineer, guitarist, and inventor. He was also the leader/producer of country rock band The Tractors.

== Early life and education ==
Ripley was born in Boise, Idaho, but grew up in Oklahoma: he attended Glencoe High School in Glencoe, Oklahoma, and graduated from Oklahoma State University.

== Career ==
Ripley's band Moses chose the name Red Dirt Records for their 1972 self-published live album; the first usage of Red Dirt. And was an early marker for the Red Dirt movement.

Ripley worked as a studio musician, producer, and recording engineer, working with Bob Dylan, playing guitar (on Shot of Love) and on the "Shot of Love" tour, with J. J. Cale (on Shades, 8 and Roll On), and he produced Clarence "Gatemouth" Brown and Roy Clark (on Makin' Music) and Johnnie Lee Wills (on Reunion) and 20/20 (on “Sex Trap”). Dylan listed Ripley as one of his favorite guitarists.

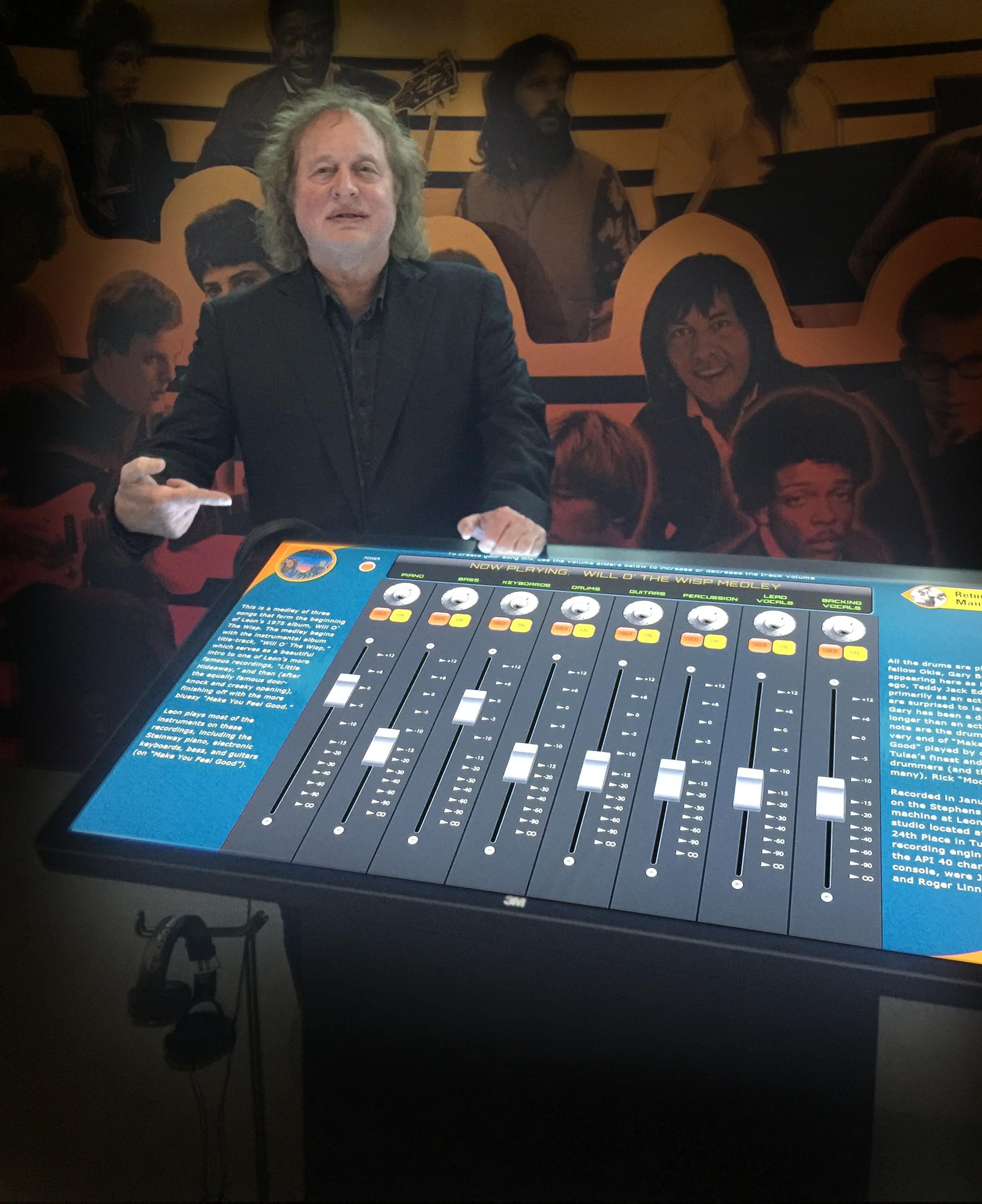
Ripley poses with the Oklahoma History Center Leon Russell mixer exhibit

In 1982, Ripley founded Ripley Guitars in Burbank, California. He created guitars for Steve Lukather, J. J. Cale, John Hiatt, Ry Cooder, Jimmy Buffett and Eddie Van Halen, before moving to Tulsa in 1987 and buying Leon Russell's former recording studio, The Church Studio.

In 1994 he formed the country band, The Tractors. He is the co-writer of the country hit "Baby Likes to Rock It".

In 2002, he created his own record label (Boy Rocking Records) to produce artists including The Tractors, Leon Russell and The Red Dirt Rangers. In 2009, he produced and hosted a 20-part radio series on the history of Oklahoma rock and roll, that aired on Oklahoma public radio stations. It was entitled "Oklahoma Rock and Roll with Steve Ripley." In 2013 Ripley produced the album Lone Chimney by the Red Dirt Rangers.

Ripley was inducted into the Oklahoma Music Awards Red Dirt Hall of Fame along with Bob Childers and Tom Skinner at the ceremony for the First Annual Red Dirt Music Awards held on Sunday, November 9, 2003, at Cain's Ballroom in Tulsa.

In 2015, Ripley worked alongside staff at the Oklahoma Historical Society to create a "Church Studio" exhibit space at the Oklahoma History Center. He remastered several of Leon Russell's songs that were available in a touchscreen kiosk that allowed a visitor to adjust individual instruments and vocal tracks to comprehend how multitrack recording works.

In 2016 Ripley produced and curated a concert at Cain's Ballroom to celebrate the music and legacy of Bob Dylan.

After his death in 2019 Ripley was inducted into the Oklahoma Historians Hall of Fame by the Oklahoma Historical Society and also received the Restless Spirit Award from the Red Dirt Relief Fund.

On August 1, 2025, Ripley was posthumously inducted into the Oklahoma Music Hall of Fame.

== Death ==
Ripley died from cancer on January 3, 2019, two days after his 69th birthday, at his home in Pawnee, Oklahoma.

== Discography ==
=== The Tractors ===
- 1994 : The Tractors (Arista)
- 1995 : Have Yourself a Tractors Christmas (Arista)
- 1998 : Farmers in a Changing World (Arista)
- 2001 : Fast Girl (Boy Rocking)
- 2002 : The Big Night (Boy Rocking)
- 2005 : The Kids Record (Boy Rocking)
- 2009 : Trade Union (Boy Rocking)
- 2020 : Tulsa (Boy Rocking)

=== Solo discography ===
- 2002 : Ripley (Boy Rocking Records) with The Jordanaires

=== Incidental music ===
- 1976: "Flying Upside Down in My Plane" (part of the soundtrack in the film, Deportee)
