= Cloris Leachman =

American actress (1926–2021)

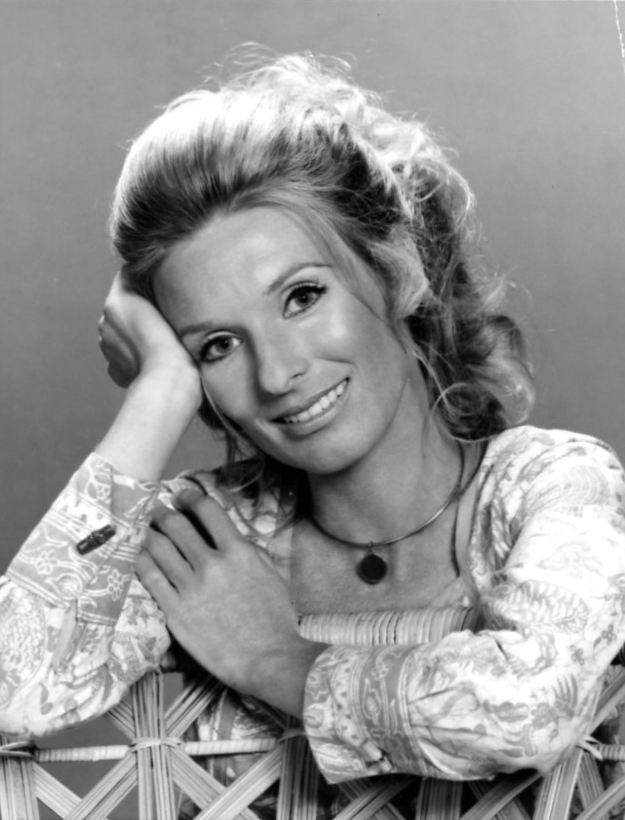
- Leachman in 1970
- Born: April 30, 1926; Des Moines, Iowa, U.S.
- Died: January 27, 2021 (aged 94); Encinitas, California, U.S.
- Education: Theodore Roosevelt High School; Northwestern University
- Occupations: Actress; model; comedian
- Years active: 1942–2021
- Known for: The Mary Tyler Moore Show; The Last Picture Show; Phyllis; The Facts of Life
- Works: Full list
- Spouse: George Englund (m. 1953; div. 1978)
- Children: 5
- Relatives: Claiborne Cary (sister); Anabel Englund (granddaughter)
- Awards: Full list

Cloris Leachman (April 30, 1926 – January 27, 2021) was an American actress and comedian whose career spanned nine decades. She received many accolades, including an Academy Award, a BAFTA Award, nine Emmy Awards, and a Golden Globe Award. She was known for her versatility and distinctive physicality, whereby she used props to accentuate and express her roles' characterizations.

Born and raised in Des Moines, Iowa, Leachman attended Northwestern University and began appearing in local plays as a teenager. After competing in the 1946 Miss America pageant, she secured a scholarship to study under Elia Kazan at the Actors Studio in New York City, making her professional debut in 1948. In film, she appeared in Peter Bogdanovich's The Last Picture Show (1971) as a neglected 1950s housewife who has an affair with a student of her husband, a high-school gym teacher; she won the Academy Award for Best Supporting Actress and the BAFTA Award for Best Actress in a Supporting Role. She was part of Mel Brooks' ensemble cast, playing Frau Blücher in Young Frankenstein (1974), Nurse Diesel in High Anxiety (1977) and Madame Defarge in History of the World, Part I (1981).

Leachman won eight Primetime Emmy Awards from 22 nominations; she is tied with Julia Louis-Dreyfus, Jean Smart, and Allison Janney for the distinction of most acting Emmy Awards ever awarded to a performer. She won Emmys for her role in The Mary Tyler Moore Show (1970–1975) and a Golden Globe for the spinoff Phyllis (1975–1977), in which she starred. She also appeared in the television film A Brand New Life (1973); A Girl Named Sooner (1975), in which she plays a reclusive, uneducated, and elderly bootlegger; the variety sketch show Cher (1975); the ABC Afterschool Special production The Woman Who Willed a Miracle (1983); and the television shows Promised Land (1998) and Malcolm in the Middle (2000–2006). Her other television credits include Gunsmoke (1961), Wagon Train (1962), The Virginian (1967), The Twilight Zone (1961; 2003) and Raising Hope (2010–2014). She also acted in the films Butch Cassidy and the Sundance Kid (1969), WUSA (1970), Herbie Goes Bananas (1980), Yesterday (1981), Castle in the Sky (1986), Spanglish (2004) and Mrs. Harris (2005). She became the oldest ever competitor on Dancing with the Stars (2008), and wrote her memoir Cloris: My Autobiography (2009).

== Early life and education ==
Leachman was born on April 30, 1926, in Des Moines, Iowa, the eldest of three daughters. Her parents were Cloris (née Wallace) and Berkeley Claiborne "Buck" Leachman. Her father worked at the family-owned Leachman Lumber Company. Her youngest sister, Claiborne Cary, was an actress and singer. Her other sister, Mary, was not in show business. Their maternal grandmother was of Bohemian (Czech) descent. Leachman attended Theodore Roosevelt High School.

As a teenager, Leachman appeared in plays by local youth on weekends at Drake University in Des Moines. After graduating from high school, she enrolled at Northwestern University in the School of Education. At Northwestern, she became a member of Gamma Phi Beta and was a classmate of future comic actors Paul Lynde and Charlotte Rae. She won "Miss W-G-N" and "Miss Chicago", then began appearing on television and in films after competing in Miss America in 1946 as Miss Chicago.

== Career ==
=== 1948–1967: Rise to prominence ===
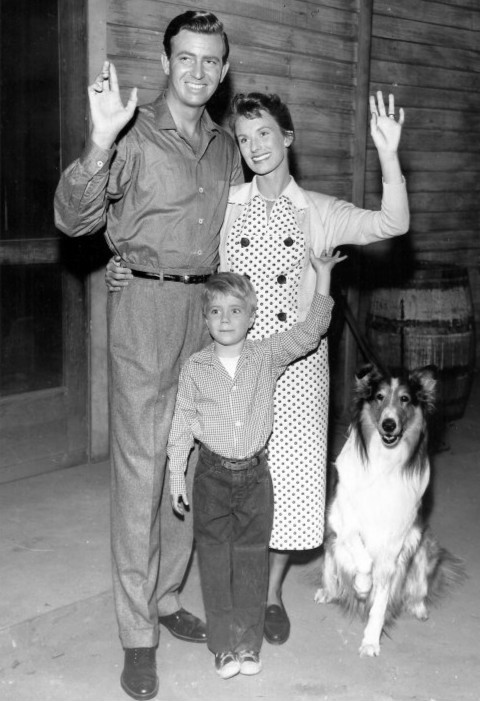
Jon Shepodd, Jon Provost, and Leachman in Lassie (1957)

After winning a scholarship in the Miss America pageant, placing in the top 16, Leachman studied acting under Elia Kazan at the Actors Studio in New York City. She had been cast as a replacement for the role of Nellie Forbush during the original run of Rodgers and Hammerstein's South Pacific. A few years later, she appeared in the Broadway-bound production of William Inge's Come Back, Little Sheba, but left the show before it reached Broadway when Katharine Hepburn asked her to co-star in a production of William Shakespeare's As You Like It. Leachman was slated to play the role of Abigail Williams in the original Broadway cast of Arthur Miller's seminal drama The Crucible. The production played four preview performances at the Playhouse Theatre in Wilmington, Delaware, from January 15–17, 1953, prior to opening on Broadway on January 22. However, Leachman left the production the day before opening night in Wilmington, with Madeleine Sherwood assuming the role. Leachman's name was heavily publicized prior to the production's opening, and her name still appeared in the printed program; a sign appeared at the box office in Wilmington noting the change.

Leachman appeared in many live television broadcasts in the 1950s, including such programs as Suspense and Studio One. She played opposite John Forsythe in Alfred Hitchcock Presents Season 1, Episode 2 "Premonition", which aired August 10, 1955. She also briefly held the role of the mother of "Lassie's" second master Timmy (Jon Provost) until she was replaced late in her only season with the cast by June Lockhart due to contract disputes. She made her feature-film debut as an extra in Carnegie Hall (1947), but her first real role was in Robert Aldrich's film noir Kiss Me Deadly, released in 1955. Leachman was several months pregnant during the filming, and appears in one scene running down a darkened highway wearing only a trench coat. A year later, she appeared opposite Paul Newman and Lee Marvin in The Rack (1956). She appeared with Newman again in a brief role in Butch Cassidy and the Sundance Kid (1969).

She continued to work mainly in television, with appearances on Rawhide and in The Twilight Zone episode "It's a Good Life" (more than forty years later, Leachman would appear in this episode's sequel, "It's Still a Good Life", an entry in the 2002–2003 UPN series revival). During this early period, Leachman featured opposite John Forsythe on the anthology Alfred Hitchcock Presents in an episode titled "Premonition" (1955). In 1956 she guest starred as "Flory Tibbs", in a complex role as an abused captive on the TV Western Gunsmoke in S2E8's "Legal Revenge". She later appeared as Ruth Martin, Timmy Martin's adoptive mother, in the last half of season four (1957) of Lassie. Jon Provost, who played Timmy, said, "Cloris did not feel particularly challenged by the role. Basically, when she realized that all she'd be doing was baking cookies, she wanted out." She was replaced by June Lockhart in 1958.

That same year, she appeared in an episode of One Step Beyond titled "The Dark Room", with Marcel Dalio, in which she portrayed an American photographer living in Paris. In 1960, she played Marilyn Parker, the roommate of Janice Rule's character, Elena Nardos, in the Checkmate episode "The Mask of Vengeance". In late 1960 she appeared on "Wanted Dead or Alive" opposite Steve McQueen in S3 E10 "The Medicine Man" as the scheming Ann Barchester. In 1961, she starred as Boni, a cold-hearted woman who would sell out her man for $500 in the TV Western Gunsmoke (S6E36 "For The Love of Money"). She appeared in The Twilight Zone S3 E8 "It's a Good Life", which aired 11/2/1961. Also in 1961, she appeared in The Donna Reed Show (S4E4 "Mouse at Play") as Donna Stone's friend, Iris. In 1962, she appeared in "The Nancy Davis Story" as a forlorn barmaid desperate for love on Wagon Train (S5E33), plus she co-starred in "Trial by Fire", on an episode of Laramie that same year, as well as the "Where Beauty Lies" episode of Alfred Hitchcock Presents opposite George Nader. In 1966, she guest-starred on Perry Mason as Gloria Shine in "The Case of the Crafty Kidnapper". In late 1970, Leachman starred in one episode of That Girl as Don Hollinger's sister, Sandy.

=== 1968–1989: Stardom and acclaim ===
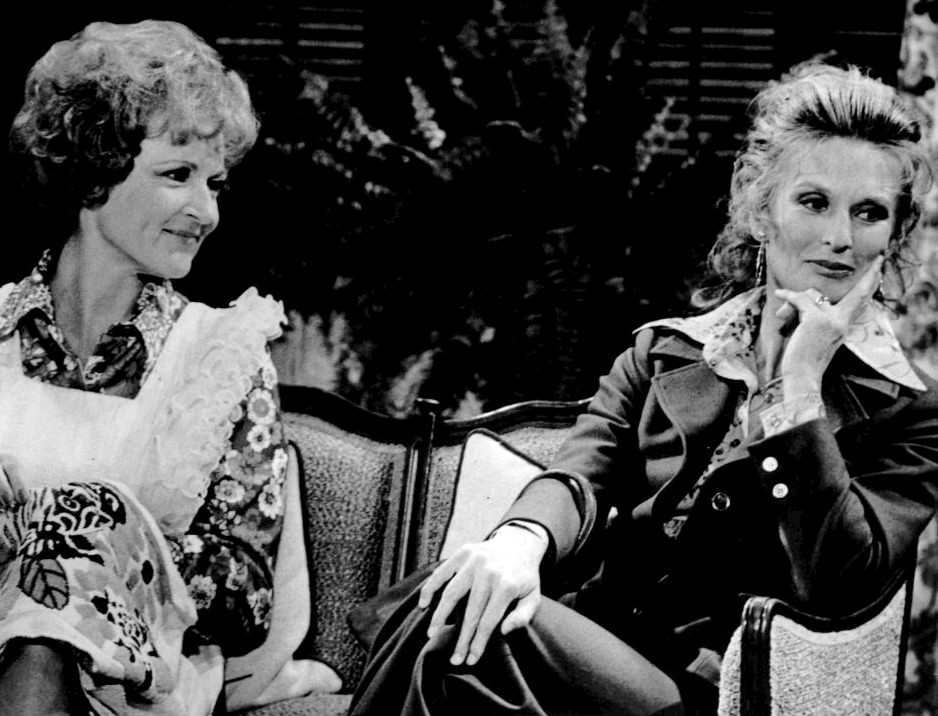
Betty White (left) and Leachman (right) on The Mary Tyler Moore Show (1973)

In the drama film The Last Picture Show (1971), based on the bestselling book by Larry McMurtry, Leachman played Ruth Popper, the high-school gym teacher's neglected wife, with whom Timothy Bottoms' character has an affair. The part was originally offered to Ellen Burstyn, but Burstyn wanted another role in the film. Director Peter Bogdanovich correctly predicted during production that Leachman would win an Oscar for her performance; she won for Best Supporting Actress. Critic Roger Ebert of the Chicago Sun-Times wrote of her performance, "The only real warmth comes from the Leachman ...The film is above all an evocation of mood. It is about a town with no reason to exist, and people with no reason to live there. The only hope is in transgression, as Ruth knows when she seduces Sonny, the boy half her age."

Leachman won acclaim portraying Phyllis Lindstrom on the CBS sitcom The Mary Tyler Moore Show. She acted alongside Mary Tyler Moore, Valerie Harper, Ed Asner, Ted Knight, and Betty White. Leachman played the recurring role of Mary Richards' snobbish, self-absorbed and interfering (but at heart well-meaning) downstairs neighbor on the program for five years. The role earned her two Primetime Emmy Award for Outstanding Supporting Actress in a Comedy Series. She was subsequently featured in a spinoff series, Phyllis (1975–1977), for which Leachman won a Golden Globe Award. The series ran for two seasons. Leachman won a record-setting eight Primetime Emmy Awards and one Daytime Emmy Award, in addition to having been nominated more than 20 times.

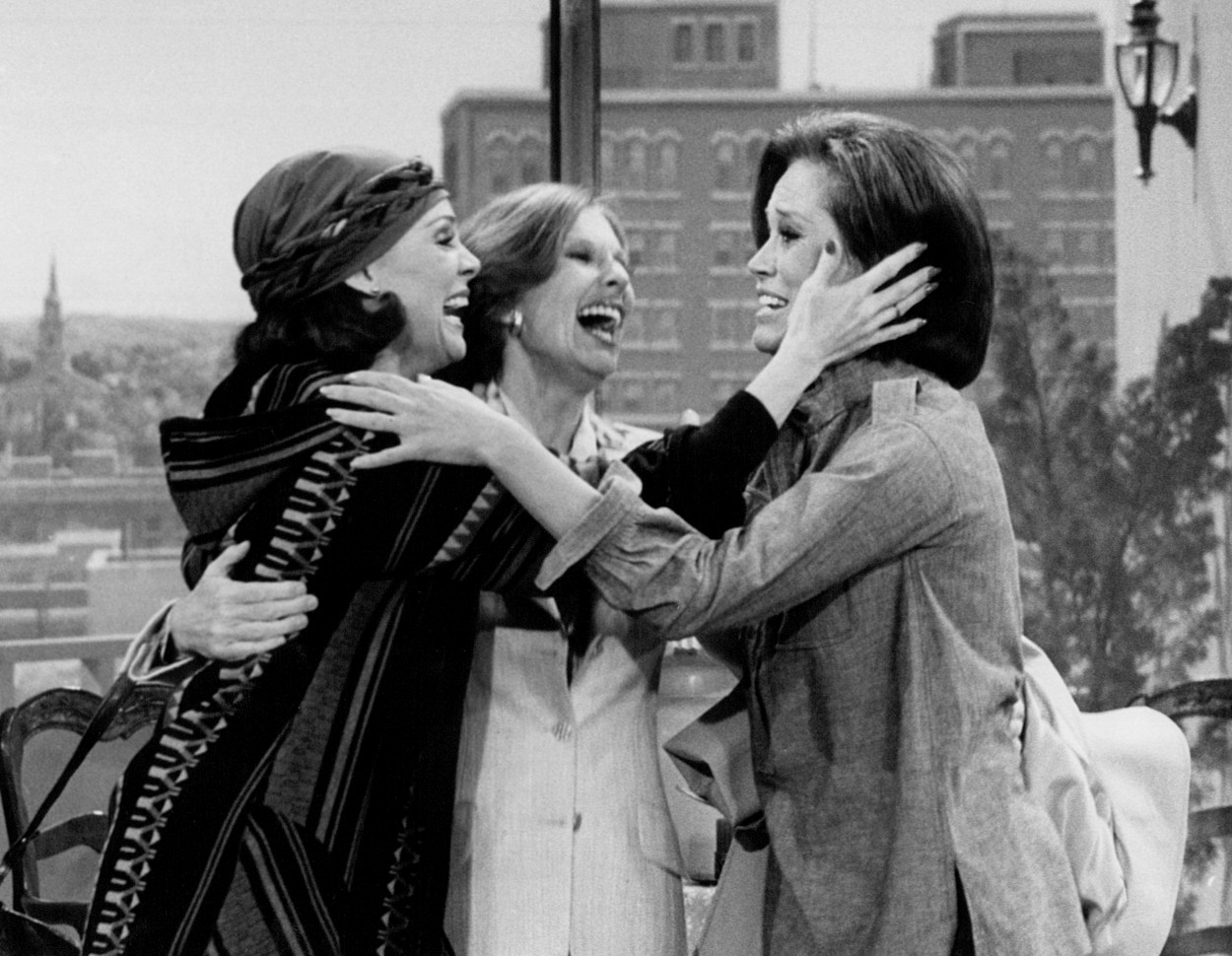
Valerie Harper, Leachman, and Mary Tyler Moore in the finale of The Mary Tyler Moore Show (1977)

Leachman appeared in three Mel Brooks films including the comedic horror satire Young Frankenstein (1974), in which the mere mention of the name of her character, Frau Blücher, elicits the loud neighing of horses (an homage to a cinematic villain stereotype). Christopher Connor of The Film Magazine wrote of her role that it provides "fine contrasts and plenty of comedic moments". She also acted in his thriller spoof High Anxiety (1977) as the demented villainess and psychiatric nurse Charlotte Diesel. In the epic satire History of the World, Part I (1981) she portrayed Madame Defarge.

In 1977, she guest-starred on The Muppet Show, episode 2.24. Thay same year, Leachman was cast as Clara, an angel with a cockney accent, who shows Mary Bailey Hatch (played by Marlo Thomas) what her life would be like if she had never been born in the ABC television remake of Frank Capra's It's A Wonderful Life called It Happened One Christmas. For her performance, Leachman was nominated for an Emmy Award. In 1978, she won the Sarah Siddons Award for her work in Chicago theater. Leachman appeared in Disney's The North Avenue Irregulars in 1979, playing the role of Claire. In 1987, she hosted the VHS releases of Schoolhouse Rock! and portrayed the evil witch Griselda for Menahem Golan's Cannon Tales production of Hansel and Gretel. In 1986, she returned to television, replacing Charlotte Rae's character Edna Garrett as the den mother in The Facts of Life. Leachman's role as Edna's sister, Beverly Ann Stickle, continued until the end of the series two years later.

=== 1989–2021: Later career and final roles ===
In 1989, Leachman starred on Brooks' short-lived NBC sitcom The Nutt House in dual roles as head hotel housekeeper Mrs. Frick (a variation of the Frau Blücher character) and Mrs. Nutt, the senile owner of the hotel. During this time she worked as a voice actor in numerous animated films, including My Little Pony: The Movie (as the evil witch mother from the Volcano of Gloom), A Troll in Central Park (as Queen Gnorga), The Iron Giant, Gen^{13}, and as the voice of the cantankerous sky pirate Dola in Hayao Miyazaki's 1986 feature Castle in the Sky. She played a reclusive but eventually friendly neighbor who regains her Christmas spirit in Prancer. She played Ferris and Jeannie's grandmother in the one-season television series Ferris Bueller, episode 9, which aired in November 1990. In 1993, she played Granny in the Penelope Spheeris film The Beverly Hillbillies. In 1999, Leachman starred in Thanks, a sitcom about a 17th-century Puritan family that was cancelled after six episodes. Leachman played embittered, greedy, Slavic Canadian "Grandma Ida" on the Fox sitcom Malcolm in the Middle, for which she won an Emmy Award for Outstanding Guest Actress in a Comedy Series (2006). She was nominated for playing the character for six consecutive years.

In 2003, Leachman played the role of Granny in Bad Santa, starring Billy Bob Thornton. And her later television credits include the Lifetime Television miniseries Beach Girls with Rob Lowe and Julia Ormond. She took a comedic role as the wine-soaked former jazz singer and grandmother Evelyn in Spanglish (2004) opposite Adam Sandler for which she was nominated for a SAG Award. She had replaced an ailing Anne Bancroft in the role. The film reunited her with the Mary Tyler Moore Show writer, producer, and director James L. Brooks. That same year, she appeared with Sandler again in the remake of The Longest Yard. She also appeared in the Kurt Russell comedy Sky High as a school nurse with X-ray vision. In 2005, she guest-starred as Charlie Harper's neighbor Norma in an episode ("Madame and Her Special Friend") of Two and a Half Men.

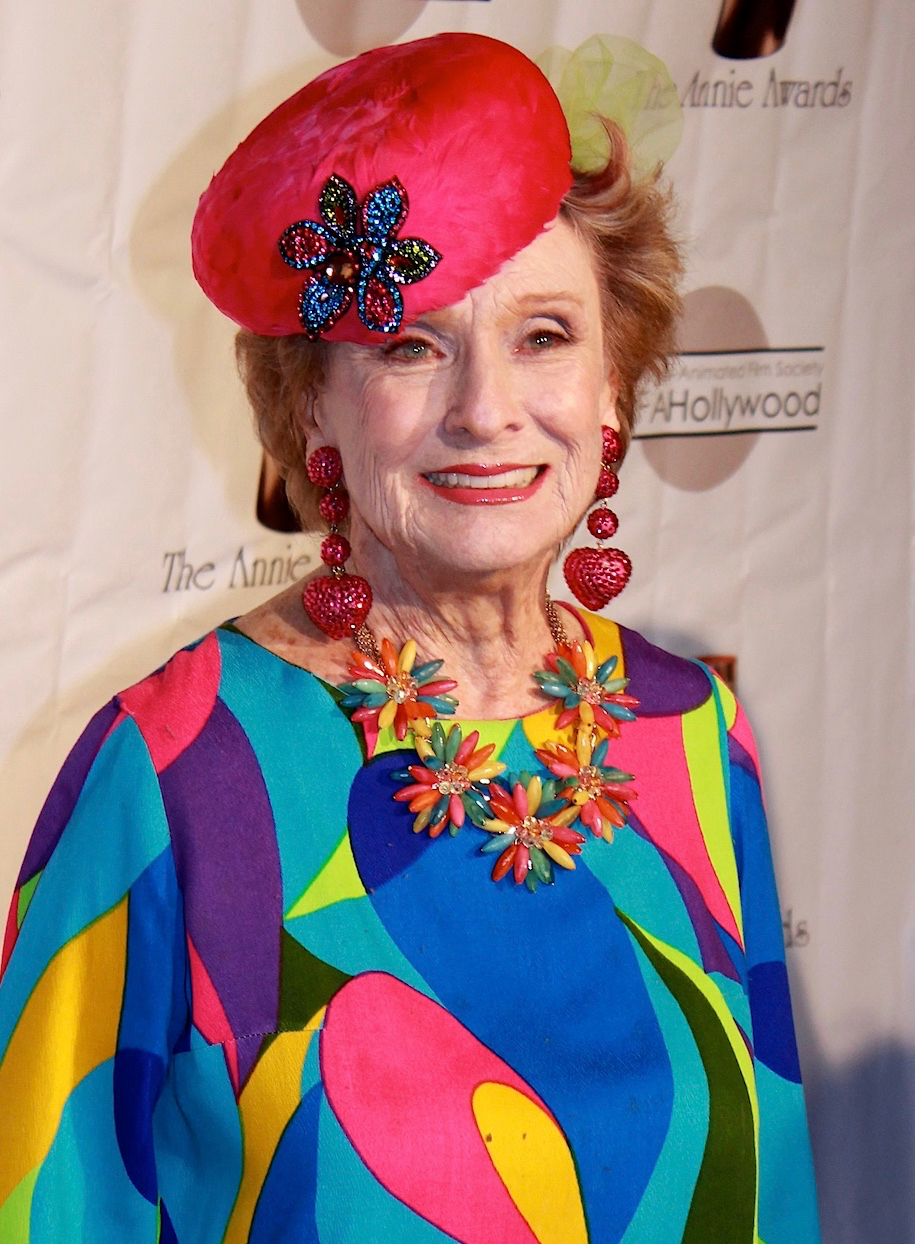
Leachman in 2014

In 2006, Leachman's performance alongside Ben Kingsley and Annette Bening in the HBO special Mrs. Harris earned her nominations for a Primetime Emmy Award, and a Screen Actors Guild Award. She auditioned to revive her role from Young Frankenstein in the 2007 Broadway production opposite Megan Mullally (who replaced Kristin Chenoweth) and Roger Bart. Andrea Martin was cast instead. Brooks was quoted as joking that Leachman, then 81, was too old for the role. "We don't want her to die on stage," Brooks (also 81, at the time) told columnist Army Archerd, a statement to which Leachman took umbrage. However, due to Leachman's success on Dancing with the Stars, Brooks then, doing a U-turn, reportedly asked her to reprise her role as Frau Blücher in the Broadway production of Young Frankenstein after the departure of Beth Leavel, who had succeeded Martin. The Broadway production closed before this could happen.

In 2008, Leachman was a contestant on the seventh season of Dancing with the Stars, paired with Corky Ballas, the oldest of the professionals and father of two-time champion Mark Ballas. Aged 82 at the time of competing, Leachman is the oldest contestant to have taken part in the show to date. She placed seventh in the competition. Also in 2008, she co-starred in The Women, a remake of the 1939 film of the same name. After Dancing with the Stars she guest starred on Disney Channel's Girl Meets World (2015) and the Christian movie I Can Only Imagine (2018). Leachman made guest roles in the NBC sitcom The Office, the TV Land series Hot in Cleveland, the CBS drama Hawaii Five-0, and USA Network's Royal Pains. During this time she portrayed a number of raunchy elderly women in several films, including Beerfest (2006), Scary Movie 4 (2006), and The Wedding Ringer (2015). From 2010 to 2014, she played another grandmother, Maw Maw, the matriarch of the family on the Fox sitcom Raising Hope, for which she was nominated for an Emmy Award for Outstanding Guest Actress in a Comedy Series.

One of Leachman's final roles was as Zorya Vechernyaya, one of the "old gods" who represented the evening star, in season one (2019) of the Showtime series American Gods. Leachman appears in the film Not to Forget (2021). The movie, directed by Valerio Zanoli, stars Karen Grassle and five Academy Award winners: Leachman, Louis Gossett Jr., Tatum O'Neal, George Chakiris, and Olympia Dukakis. In 2020 Leachman played the declining grandmother of a budding drag queen, who is struggling to cling to her last shred of freedom, in Jump, Darling.

On May 14, 2006, she was awarded an honorary doctorate in fine arts from Drake University.

== Acting credits and awards ==
- Leachman was inducted into the Television Academy Hall of Fame in 2011. That same year, she was ranked number 23 on the TV Guide Network special Funniest Women on TV.
- On June 20, 2014, Leachman received an honorary degree from her alma mater, Northwestern University.
- In 2017, she received PETA's Lifetime Achievement Award for her dedication to animal-rights issues.
- She was awarded a Star on the Hollywood Walk of Fame in the Television Category on September 22, 1980, at 6435 Hollywood Boulevard.

== Personal life ==
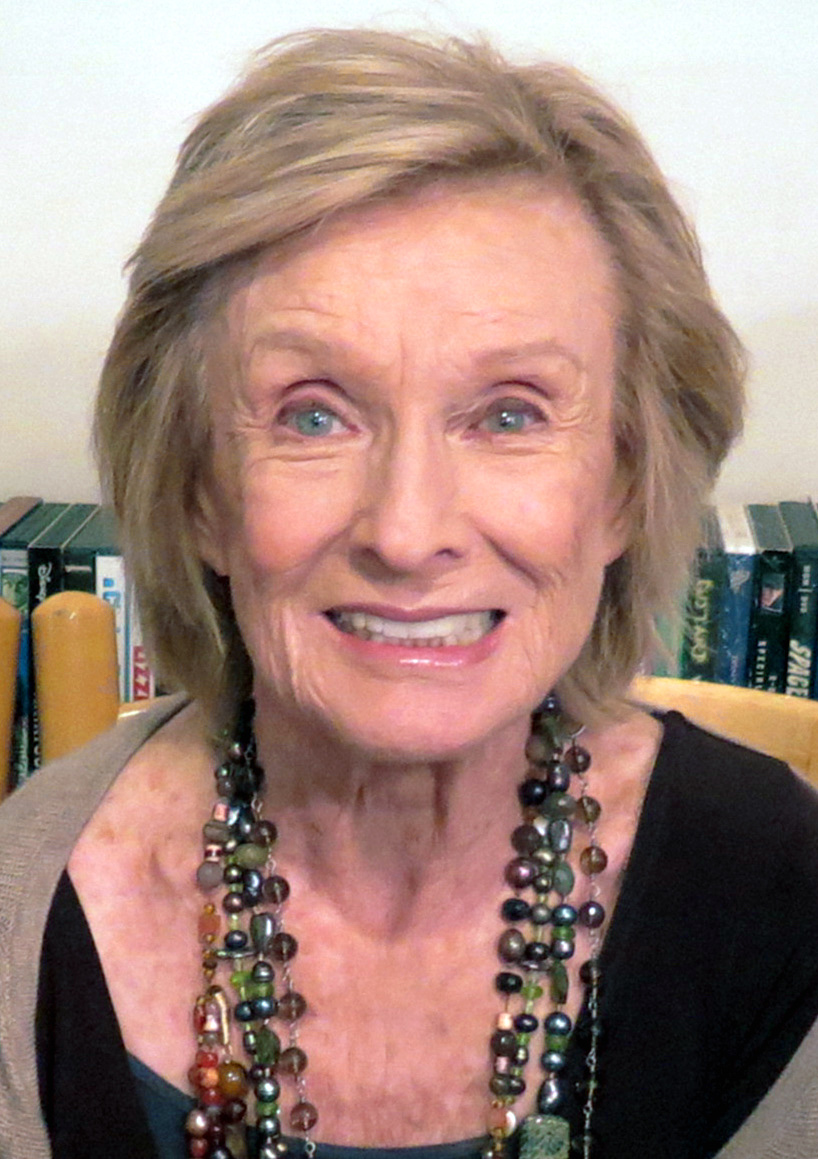
Leachman in November 2015

From 1953 to 1978, Leachman was married to Hollywood impresario George Englund. Her former mother-in-law was character actress Mabel Albertson. The marriage produced four sons and one daughter: Bryan (died 1986), Morgan, Adam, Dinah, and George. Some of them are in show business. Her son Morgan played Dylan on Guiding Light for several years. The Englunds were Bel Air neighbors of Judy Garland, Sidney Luft, and their children, Lorna and Joey Luft, during the early 1960s. Lorna Luft stated in her memoir Me and My Shadows: A Family Memoir that Leachman was "the kind of mom I'd only seen on TV". Knowing of the turmoil at the Luft home, but never mentioning it, Leachman prepared meals for the children and made them feel welcome when they needed a place to stay.

Leachman was also a friend of Mort Sahl and Marlon Brando, whom she met while studying under Elia Kazan in the 1950s. She introduced him to her husband, who became close to Brando, as well, directing him in The Ugly American (1963) and writing a memoir about their friendship called Marlon Brando: The Way It's Never Been Done Before (2005).

Leachman was a vegetarian and an animal rights activist. In 1997, she appeared on the cover of Alternative Medicine Digest, posing nude while body-painted with images of fruit in a parody of Demi Moore's 1991 Vanity Fair cover photo. She also posed clad in a dress made of lettuce for a 2009 PETA advertisement. In 2013, she starred in a comedic PETA ad on spay and neuter in which she opened a condom wrapper with her teeth. Leachman's granddaughter, Anabel Englund, is a singer. In addition to Anabel, Leachman had other grandchildren, and one great-grandson, Braden. Leachman was an atheist.

== Death ==
Leachman died at her home in Encinitas, California, at the age of 94. The cause of death was a stroke with COVID-19 as a contributing factor. Leachman's manager, Juliet Green, confirmed to People magazine that she had died on January 27, 2021. Leachman's son also confirmed this date to The New York Times. However, some sources cited a death date of January 26. Her body was cremated on February 7, 2021, and her ashes are in the possession of her daughter.

== Bibliography ==
Leachman's autobiography, Cloris: My Autobiography, was published in March 2009. She co-authored the bestselling book with her ex-husband George Englund.
