= A Brand New Life (1973 film) =

- Genre: Drama
- Written by: Peggy Chantler Dick
- Screenplay by: Jerome Kass and Peggy Chantler Dick
- Directed by: Sam O'Steen
- Starring: Martin Balsam; Cloris Leachman; Marge Redmond; Gene Nelson; Mildred Dunnock; Wilfred Hyde-White
- Music by: Billy Goldenberg
- Country of origin: United States
- Original language: English

Production
- Producer: Robert W. Christiansen Rick Rosenberg
- Cinematography: David M. Walsh
- Editor: William H. Ziegler
- Running time: 74 minutes
- Production company: Tomorrow Entertainment

Original release
- Network: ABC
- Release: February 20, 1973

A Brand New Life is a 1973 American made-for-television drama film directed by Sam O'Steen. It stars Cloris Leachman and Martin Balsam. Leachman won the Primetime Emmy Award for Outstanding Single Performance by an Actress in a Leading Role for her performance.

== Plot ==
A middle-aged couple faces the impending birth of their first child.

== Cast ==
- Cloris Leachman as Victoria Douglas
- Martin Balsam as Jim Douglas
- Marge Redmond as Eleanor
- Gene Nelson as Harry
- Mildred Dunnock as Mother
- Wilfred Hyde-White as Mr. Berger
- Barbara Colby as Jessica Hiller

== Release ==
The movie debuted on ABC on February 20, 1973, as the "ABC Tuesday Movie of the Week". It was the ninth-most viewed primetime offering of the week in the United States, with a 23.6 rating.

== Syndication ==
The film was screened in Rhodesia on RTV Salisbury on August 14, 1976 with a PG rating.

== Reception ==
The film received positive reviews, with Howard Thompson of The New York Times stating, "most made-for-TV movies emerge like assembly-line lard, but 'A Brand New Life' is a joy" and calling it "literate, moving, amusing and genuinely sophisticated in its quiet, observant wisdom."

== See also ==
- List of American films of 1973
