= I'm Tore Down =

Single by Freddy King

from the album Freddy King Sings
- B-side: "Sen-Sa-Shun"
- Released: October 1961
- Recorded: 1961
- Genre: Blues
- Length: 2:33
- Label: Federal
- Songwriter: Sonny Thompson

"I'm Tore Down" or "Tore Down" is a blues song first recorded in 1961 by Freddie King (who was then known as "Freddy" King) for Federal Records. Pianist Sonny Thompson, who played on several early King songs, is credited as the songwriter. When Federal released it as single in 1961, with the instrumental "Sen-Sa-Shun" as the B-side, it reached number five on Billboard's Hot R&B Sides singles chart.

Federal parent company King Records included the song on King's first album Freddy King Sings (1961). In 1971, King recorded a longer version for his Shelter Records album Getting Ready...

== Other renditions ==
English rock musician Eric Clapton recorded "I'm Tore Down" for his 1994 blues tribute album From the Cradle. For his recording, Clapton uses an arrangement close to King's original, including the falsetto vocal phrases and guitar fills. Reprise Records released a compact disc promotional single in 1994, which reached number five on Billboard's Mainstream Rock chart. Clapton has performed the song on several occasions; live recordings appear on Live in Hyde Park (1997) and John Mayall's 70th Birthday Concert (2003).

A studio version by Northern Irish guitarist and singer Gary Moore is included on the 2021 album How Blue Can You Get. In an album review for Classic Rock magazine, Hugh Fielder describes it as "a hard-hitting, well-greased version of Freddie King’s I’m Tore Down, with Moore’s mean, gritty voice sliding all over the place and his vicious guitar phrases doing much the same".
