= Troubadour (J. J. Cale album) =

Studio album by J. J. Cale
- Released: September 1976
- Recorded: 1976
- Genres: Rock, roots rock, blues rock
- Length: 36:11
- Label: Shelter
- Producer: Audie Ashworth

J. J. Cale chronology
Okie (1974)	Troubadour (1976)	5 (1979)

Singles from Troubadour
- 1. "Hey Baby" Released: 1976; 2. "Cocaine" Released: 1977; 3. "Travelin' Light" Released: 1977; 4. "You Got Something" Released: 1977; 5. "I'm a Gypsy Man" Released: 1978

Professional ratings
Review scores
Source	Rating
AllMusic	4.5/5 stars
Christgau's Record Guide	B−

Troubadour is the fourth studio album by J. J. Cale, released in September 1976.

Eric Clapton covered the song "Cocaine" on his 1977 album Slowhand, turning it into one of his biggest hits.

== Recording ==
Troubadour was produced by Audie Ashworth, who produced Cale's first three studio albums. It sees Cale introducing new instruments to his sound, such as synthesizer on "Ride Me High", with William Ruhlmann of AllMusic noting, "Producer Audie Ashworth introduced some different instruments, notably vibes and what sound like horns (although none are credited), for a slightly altered sound on Troubadour. But J.J. Cale's albums are so steeped in his introspective style that they become interchangeable. If you like one of them, chances are you'll want to have them all." Several noted musicians play on the album, including Ken Buttrey, Buddy Emmons, and Reggie Young.

In the 2004 documentary To Tulsa and Back, Cale recalled, "I wrote 'Cocaine', and I'm a big fan of Mose Allison...So I had written the song in a Mose Allison bag, kind of cocktail jazz kind of swing...And Audie said, 'That's really a good song, John, but you oughta make that a little more rock and roll, a little more commercial.' I said, 'Great, man.' So I went back and recut it again as the thing you heard." The song's meaning is ambiguous, although Eric Clapton describes it as an anti-drug song. He has called the song "quite cleverly anti-cocaine", noting:

It's no good to write a deliberate anti-drug song and hope that it will catch. Because the general thing is that people will be upset by that. It would disturb them to have someone else shoving something down their throat. So the best thing to do is offer something that seems ambiguous—that on study or on reflection actually can be seen to be "anti"—which the song "Cocaine" is actually an anti-cocaine song. If you study it or look at it with a little bit of thought ... from a distance ... or as it goes by ... it just sounds like a song about cocaine. But actually, it is quite cleverly anti-cocaine.

Although "Cocaine" would be a major hit for Clapton in 1977, the first single released by Cale from Troubadour in 1976 was the restless "Travelin' Light" with "Hey Baby" as the B-side. Critics from the music website Alltime Records reviewed the recording: "'Travelin' Light', with its funky James Burton–style guitar that Jimmy Page tried to copy on "The Crunge", along with great xylophones to fill out the sound – it moves and cooks and rolls and rocks and has just an absolutely earthy quality". The song was released as a part of various compilation albums, including 20th Century Masters – The Millennium Collection: The Best of J.J. Cale in 2002, The Ultimate Collection in 2004 and Classic Album Selection in 2013. Clapton later covered "Travelin' Light" for his 2001 studio album Reptile. "Travelin' Light" was also recorded by Widespread Panic for their album Space Wrangler in 1988.

Cale's own version of "Travelin' Light" was played to awaken the crews of the Atlantis Space Shuttle and International Space Station preceding their spacewalk early on Friday May 21, 2010.

== Track listing ==
All songs written by J. J. Cale, except "I'm a Gypsy Man", by Sonny Curtis.

1. "Hey Baby" – 3:11
2. "Travelin' Light" – 2:50
3. "You Got Something" – 4:00
4. "Ride Me High" – 3:34
5. "Hold On" – 1:58
6. "Cocaine" – 2:48
7. "I'm a Gypsy Man" – 2:42
8. "The Woman That Got Away" – 2:52
9. "Super Blue" – 2:40
10. "Let Me Do It to You" – 2:58
11. "Cherry" – 3:21
12. "You Got Me On So Bad" – 3:17

== Personnel ==
- Guitar: Doug Bartenfeld, Bill Boatman, Harold Bradley, Chuck Browning, J. J. Cale, Gordon Payne, Reggie Young.
- Steel guitar: Buddy Emmons, Lloyd Green
- Bass: J. J. Cale, Tommy Cogbill, Charles Dungey, Joe Osborn, Bill Raffensperger
- Keyboards: J. J. Cale, Bill Pursell, Don Tweedy, Bobby Woods
- Drums: Kenny Buttrey, Buddy Harman, Karl Himmel, Jimmy Karstein, Kenny Malone
- Percussion: J.I. Allison, Audie Ashworth, Farrell Morris
- Saxophone: Billy Puett
- Trumpet: George Tidwell
- Trombone: Dennis Goode
- Additional Vocals: Gary S. Paxton

== Charts ==
=== Weekly charts ===
Chart (1976–1977)	Peak position
Austrian Albums (Ö3 Austria)	24
Dutch Albums (Album Top 100)	4
German Albums (Offizielle Top 100)	22
New Zealand Albums (RMNZ)	2
Norwegian Albums (VG-lista)	9
Swedish Albums (Sverigetopplistan)	43
UK Albums (Official Charts)	53
US Billboard 200	84

=== Year-end charts ===
Chart (1977)	Position
New Zealand Albums (RMNZ)	12

== Certifications ==
Region	Certification	Certified units/sales
United Kingdom (BPI)	Silver	60,000^{^}
^{^} Shipments figures based on certification alone.
