= 70th Birthday Concert (John Mayall & the Bluesbreaker album) =

Live album by John Mayall & the Bluesbreakers
- Released: 2003
- Recorded: Liverpool, England on 19 July 2003
- Genre: Blues
- Length: 137:00 approx (DVD) / 153 min approx (2CD) / 159 min approx (BR)
- Label: Eagle
- Producer: Perry Joseph

Professional ratings
Review scores
Source	Rating
Allmusic	4.5/5 stars
The Penguin Guide to Blues Recordings	3/4 stars

70th Birthday Concert is a live electric blues video recording of John Mayall & the Bluesbreakers to celebrate Mayall's 70th Birthday. Recorded in Liverpool, England on 19 July 2003, the concert was notable as it featured Eric Clapton as a guest, so marked the first time he and Mayall had performed together in almost 40 years, if one discounts Clapton guesting on Mayall's Back to the Roots. The set also features Mick Taylor and Chris Barber.

The gig was released on different formats. The original double CD contains the entire concert, whereas the DVD omitted the first two tracks sung by Buddy Whittington (which did not feature Mayall) and "California", but included an interview with Mayall as bonus. A CD/DVD issue included a heavily abridged version of the concert on CD. Finally, in 2009 the video was reissued on Blu-Ray Disc with the previously omitted three tracks appended as bonus tracks.

AllMusic praised the recording by stating that John Mayall is "on top of his game as ever", the band "play with plenty of fire, brilliant musicianship, and taste", and the whole concert is "a stinging, overdriven performance of modern electric blues by a master bandleader who shows no signs of slowing down physically, and most importantly, creatively."

== Track listing ==
All tracks composed by John Mayall; except where noted

1. "Grits Ain't Groceries" (Titus Turner) - 5:14
2. "Jacksboro Highway" (Bill Carter, Ruth Ellsworth, Gary Nicholson, Wally Wilson) - 5:31
3. "Southside Story" (Fontaine Brown) - 7:51
4. "Kids Got The Blues" - 3:55
5. "Dirty Water" (Julie Miller, Buddy Miller) - 8:08
6. "Somebody's Acting Like a Child" - 8:00
7. "Blues for the Lost Days" - 12:26
8. "Walking on Sunset" - 6:26
9. "Oh Pretty Woman" (A.C. Williams) - 8:95
10. "No Big Hurry" - 6:30
11. "Please, Mr. Lofton" - 7:03
12. "Hide Away" (Freddie King, Sonny Thompson) - 4:50
13. "All Your Love" (Otis Rush) - 4:19
14. "Have You Heard" - 18:02
15. "Hoochie Coochie Man" (Willie Dixon) - 6:25
16. "I'm Tore Down" (Freddie King, Sonny Thompson) - 5:55
17. "It Ain't Right" (Little Walter) - 6:18
18. "California" (John Mayall, Steve Thompson) - 18:30
19. "Talk to Your Daughter" (Alex Atkins, J.B. Lenoir) - 8:57

== CD in CD+DVD ==
1. "Dirty Water" (Julie Miller, Buddy Miller) - 8:08
2. "Walking on Sunset" - 6:26
3. "Please, Mr. Lofton" - 7:03
4. "Hide Away" (Freddie King, Sonny Thompson) - 4:50
5. "Have You Heard" - 18:02
6. "It Ain't Right" (Little Walter) - 6:18
7. "California" (John Mayall, Steve Thompson) - 18:30
8. "Talk to Your Daughter" (Alex Atkins, J.B. Lenoir) - 8:57

== Personnel ==
- John Mayall – Vocals, Harmonica, Rhythm Guitar, Lead Guitar, Keyboards, Organ, Piano (except Tracks 1 & 2)

The Bluesbreakers (except Tracks 10 & 11)

- Buddy Whittington – Lead & rhythm guitar, vocals on Tracks 1 & 2
- Tom Canning – Hammond B3 organ, piano on track 18
- Hank Van Sickle – Electric bass
- Joe Yuele – Drums

Guests

- Mick Taylor – Lead guitar Tracks 6–9, 18 & 19
- Eric Clapton – Lead guitar Tracks 10–16, 19 and Vocals, Guitar on "Hoochie Coochie Man", "I'm Tore Down".
- Chris Barber – Trombone Tracks 11–16, 18 & 19

Horn section on Tracks 6–9, 18 & 19

- Henry Lowther – Trumpet
- Julian Arguelles – Baritone saxophone
- Dave Lewis – Tenor saxophone

== Sources ==
- Cduniverse.com
