= Let's Hide Away and Dance Away with Freddy King =

Studio album by Freddy King
- Released: 1961
- Recorded: August 25, 1960 – April 5, 1961
- Genre: Blues
- Length: 33:24
- Label: King

Freddy King chronology
Freddy King Sings (1961)	Let's Hide Away and Dance Away with Freddy King (1961)	Bossa Nova and Blues (1962)

Let's Hide Away and Dance Away with Freddy King is a 1961 instrumental album by blues guitarist and singer Freddie King (at the time spelled "Freddy"). Released on King Records, the album contained a number of influential songs and two hit singles, "Hide Away" and "San-Ho-Zay". The former reached number five on the Billboard Hot R&B chart and number 29 on the broader Hot 100 chart, while the latter reached numbers four and 47. The album, itself influential, has been critically well received.

== Critical reception and influence ==
Professional ratings
Review scores
Source	Rating
AllMusic	4.5/5 stars

The album and several of the songs it contains have been influential. According to 2006's Encyclopedia of the Blues, the song "Hide Away" has become "[o]ne of the most popular blues instrumentals of all time", a "mandatory staple of blues bands" at its time and "a standard for countless blues and rock musicians performing today."

All Music Guide to the Blues indicates that in addition to "Hide Away", which it describes as "Freddie King's signature tune and most influential recording", several of the other songs on the album also became blues classics, including "San-Ho-Zay" and "The Stumble". Encyclopedia of the Blues adds that "Sen-Sa-Shun", too, became a favorite songs for instrumental bands.

Jerry Garcia of the Grateful Dead, who have covered "Hide Away" and "Heads Up" live on several occasions, specifically cited "San-Ho-Zay" and "Sensation" (sic) as among the Freddie King album tracks that inspired him. The album, which was cited as an influence by blues guitarist Stevie Ray Vaughan. It was critically well received. It is described in the Encyclopedia of the Blues as "highly regarded".

In 2007, the Houston Chronicle listed the album as number six on its list of 75 essential Texas blues albums, indicating that "If Gilmer's King had only recorded the song 'Hide Away', his legend as an influential blues guitar player would be secure. But this entire album cooks."

== Track listing ==
Except where otherwise noted, all songs by Freddie King and Sonny Thompson.

1. "Hide Away" – 2:43
2. "Butterscotch" – 3:04
3. "Sen-Sa-Shun" – 2:54
4. "Side Tracked" (King) – 3:07
5. "The Stumble" – 3:14
6. "Wash Out" – 2:38
7. "San-Ho-Zay" – 2:40
8. "Just Pickin'" (King) – 2:33
9. "Heads Up" – 2:33
10. "In the Open" – 3:11
11. "Out Front" – 2:40
12. "Swooshy" – 2:19

== Personnel ==
- Freddie King – lead guitar
- Fred Jordan – rhythm guitar
- Sonny Thompson – piano
- Bill Willis – bass guitar
- Phillip Paul – drums
- Gene Redd – saxophone
- Clifford Scott – saxophone
