= Have You Ever Loved a Woman =

Single by Freddie King

from the album Freddie King Sings
- B-side: "You've Got to Love Her with a Feeling"
- Released: October 13, 1960
- Recorded: August 26, 1960
- Genre: Blues
- Length: 3:07
- Label: Federal
- Songwriter: Billy Myles

Freddie King singles chronology
"Country Boy" (1956)	"Have You Ever Loved a Woman" (1960)	"Hide Away" (1961)

"Have You Ever Loved a Woman" is a blues song written by Billy Myles and first recorded by American blues artist Freddie King in 1960. The song is performed as a slow 12-bar blues with King's vocal and guitar accompanied by a small combo of pianist Sonny Thompson, bassist Bill Willis, and drummer Phillip Paul.

When the song was released as a single by Federal Records in 1961, only the B-side, "You've Got to Love Her with a Feeling", reached the Billboard Hot 100 chart. The song was included on King's first album, Freddy King Sings, also issued by Federal in 1961.

== Eric Clapton renditions ==
"Have You Ever Loved a Woman" later became a part of English guitarist-singer Eric Clapton's repertoire, with several recorded versions. The first was a live rendition in 1965 while he was a member of John Mayall & the Bluesbreakers (Primal Solos, released 1977); then a studio version with Derek and the Dominos (Layla and Other Assorted Love Songs, 1970); and later live recordings on In Concert (1970, released 1973); E. C. Was Here (1975), Just One Night (as a medley with "Ramblin' on My Mind", 1980), 24 Nights (1991), Live in Hyde Park (1997), One More Car, One More Rider (2002), Crossroads Guitar Festival 2004, Nothing but the Blues (2022).
