= 70th Birthday Concert =

70th Birthday Concert may refer to:

- 70th Birthday Concert (John Mayall & the Bluesbreaker album)
- 70th Birthday Concert (Duke Ellington album)
