= Travelin' Light (J. J. Cale song) =

Single by J.J. Cale

from the album Troubadour
- B-side: "Hey Baby"
- Released: 1976
- Recorded: 1976
- Length: 2:50
- Label: Shelter
- Songwriter: J.J. Cale
- Producer: Audie Ashworth

J.J. Cale singles chronology
| "Lies" (1972) | "Travelin' Light" (1976) | "Katy Kool Lady" (1979) |

"Travelin' Light" is a song written and recorded by the Tulsa musician J.J. Cale. It was released in September 1976 on Cale's fourth studio album Troubadour under Shelter Records. It was also released as a single the same year. It was later covered by the British guitarist Eric Clapton for his 2001 studio album Reptile and helped to promote both the song and studio album on which "Travelin' Light" was first released. Athens, Georgia band Widespread Panic also covered it on their debut album, and it has continued to be a mainstay of their live show ever since.

== Original recording ==
Cale recorded the song in 1976 and released it in September 1976 on his studio album Troubadour and it was also released as a single by Shelter Records the same year. Cale's recording was produced by Audie Ashworth and is two minute and 50 second long. Critics from the music website Alltime Records reviewed the recording: "'Travelin' Light', with its funky James Burton–style guitar that Jimmy Page tried to copy on "The Crunge", along with great xylophones to fill out the sound – it moves and cooks and rolls and rocks and has just an absolutely earthy quality". The song was released as a part of various compilation albums, including 20th Century Masters – The Millennium Collection: The Best of J.J. Cale (2002), The Ultimate Collection (2004), and Classic Album Selection (2013). JJ Cale's version of his own "Travelin' Light" was played to awaken the crews of the Atlantis Space Shuttle and International Space Station preceding their spacewalk early on Friday May 21, 2010.

== Eric Clapton's version ==
On March 13 2001 Eric Clapton released his version of the song on his studio album Reptile, which was produced by Clapton and Simon Climie. AllMusic critic William Ruhlmann compared the Clapton cover with his 1977 version of another Cale tune, "Cocaine", noting fans will enjoy the 2001 cover as much as the 1977 hit single release. Critics from the German music website Planet Guitar called Clapton's cover a "raw blues rock tune with a lot of Clapton guitar riffs and licks". Journalist Simon Warner of PopMatters liked "the rolling Southern boogie of J.J. Cale's 'Travelin' Light', leavened somewhat by the vocal backing of the Impressions". Billboard magazines Christa L. Titus noted: "Clapton adheres to the standard that imitation is the highest form of flattery by holding close to Cale's composition, though Clapton's vocal delivery is smoother and deeper; the music also has a better flow and a fuller feel to it, thanks to a Hammond organ humming along in the background. Since the lyric is sparse, the music does the talking, and Slowhand lets it have its say with some extensive, bluesy guitar soloing at both the bridge and the outro". Clapton's cover version was also included on the compilation albums Pilgrim/Reptile in 2008 and The Platinum Collection: Reptile/Me & Mr. Johnson/MTV Unplugged in 2010. Clapton also performed the song live during his Reptile World Tour in 2001, filling the live performances with a "lumberingly, heavy top" as The Guardian critic Adam Sweeting reviewed.

Car manufacturer Mercedes-Benz used Clapton's version for their G-Class commercial.
