= The Stumble =

Single by Freddie King

from the album Let's Hide Away and Dance Away with Freddy King
- B-side: "Takin' Care of Business"
- Released: 1962
- Recorded: 1961
- Genre: Blues
- Length: 3:15
- Label: Federal
- Songwriters: Freddie King, Sonny Thompson

"The Stumble" is a blues guitar instrumental composed and recorded by American blues artist Freddie King, for his 1961 album Let's Hide Away and Dance Away with Freddy King. It is considered a blues classic and follows in a string of popular instrumentals recorded by King in the early 1960s, including "Hide Away", "San-Ho-Zay", and "Sen-Sa-Shun".

King uses a melodic guitar line and a chord progression that differs somewhat from that of the typical I–IV–V 12-bar format, such as starting on the IV (or subdominant) chord and a vi–ii–V–I turnaround. In comparison to the more widely-known "Hide Away", music writer Dave Ruben describes it as "a virtuosic recording, with only [King's] 'Remington Ride' hot on its tail in the chops-required department". "The Stumble", along with several other of King's most well-known instrumentals, is included on Rhino Entertainment's Hide Away: The Best of Freddy King (1993).

As perhaps King's second most popular instrumental, "The Stumble" has been recorded by many artists. Rubin notes recordings by:

- Jeff Beck with the Yardbirds (1965, Glimpses 1963–1968)
- Peter Green with John Mayall and the Bluesbreakers (1967, A Hard Road)
- Dave Edmunds with Love Sculpture (1968, Blues Helping)
- Bugs Henderson (1998, Heartbroke Again)
