= Reptile World Tour =

2001 concert tour by Eric Clapton

- World concert by Eric Clapton
- Associated album: Reptile
- Start date: 3 February 2001
- End date: 15 December 2001
- No. of shows: 8 in South America; 16 in Asia; 35 in Europe; 45 in North America
- Box office: $ 45,000,000

The Reptile World Tour (sometimes: The Reptile Tour) was a worldwide concert tour by British Rock musician Eric Clapton in support of his album Reptile. The tour began on February 3, 2001 at London's Royal Albert Hall and ended on December 15, 2001 at the Yokohama Arena in Yokohama. In 2001, Clapton said this was going to be his last major world tour. However, he did perform another world tour in 2011 to support his Clapton album.

Two shows from this tour were recorded at the Staples Center in Los Angeles on August 18 & 19, 2001. They were later released on both CD and DVD as the live album, One More Car, One More Rider, in November 2002.

== Set list ==
1. "Key to the Highway"
2. "Reptile"
3. "Got You on My Mind"
4. "Tears in Heaven"
5. "Bell Bottom Blues"
6. "Change the World"
7. "My Father's Eyes"
8. "River of Tears"
9. "Going Down Slow"
10. "She's Gone"
11. "I Want a Little Girl"
12. "Badge"
13. "(I'm Your) Hoochie Coochie Man"
14. "Have You Ever Loved a Woman"
15. "Cocaine"
16. "Wonderful Tonight"
17. "Layla"
18. "Sunshine of Your Love"
19. "Over the Rainbow"

Sometimes Clapton performed songs like "It's Alright", "Finally Got Myself Together" and "I Ain't Gonna Stand for It" just when The Impressions were included on concert dates. If the vocal group had not appeared on a gig with Clapton, he did not perform the song. For dates in the North American tour, Billy Preston sang Will It Go Round in Circles.

== Tour dates ==
List of concerts, showing date, city, country, venue, opening act, tickets sold, number of available tickets and amount of gross revenue
Date	City	Country	Venue	Opening act	Attendance	Revenue
Europe
3 February 2001	London	England	Royal Albert Hall	Doyle Bramhall II & Smokestack	—N/a	—N/a
4 February 2001	London	England	Royal Albert Hall	Doyle Bramhall II & Smokestack	—N/a	—N/a
6 February 2001	London	England	Royal Albert Hall	Doyle Bramhall II & Smokestack	—N/a	—N/a
9 February 2001	London	England	Royal Albert Hall	Doyle Bramhall II & Smokestack	—N/a	—N/a
10 February 2001	London	England	Royal Albert Hall	Doyle Bramhall II & Smokestack	—N/a	—N/a
12 February 2001	Sheffield	England	Sheffield Arena	Doyle Bramhall II & Smokestack	—N/a	—N/a
14 February 2001	Manchester	England	Evening News Arena	Doyle Bramhall II & Smokestack	—N/a	—N/a
16 February 2001	Birmingham	England	LG Arena	Doyle Bramhall II & Smokestack	—N/a	—N/a
20 February 2001	Lisbon	Portugal	Pavilhão Atlântico	Doyle Bramhall II & Smokestack	16,000	—N/a
22 February 2001	Madrid	Spain	Palacio de los Deportes	Doyle Bramhall II & Smokestack	10,000	—N/a
23 February 2001	Madrid	Spain	Palacio de los Deportes	Doyle Bramhall II & Smokestack	10,000	—N/a
25 February 2001	Barcelona	Spain	Palau Sant Jordi	Doyle Bramhall II & Smokestack	18,000	—N/a
26 February 2001	Toulouse	France	Le Zénith de Toulouse	Doyle Bramhall II & Smokestack	10,000	—N/a
28 February 2001	Florence	Italy	Florence Palasport	Doyle Bramhall II & Smokestack	7,500	—N/a
2 March 2001	Milan	Italy	Mediolanum Forum	Doyle Bramhall II & Smokestack	—N/a	—N/a
3 March 2001	Pesaro	Italy	BPA Palas	Doyle Bramhall II & Smokestack	—N/a	—N/a
5 March 2001	Zürich	Switzerland	Hallenstadion	Doyle Bramhall II & Smokestack	12,500	—N/a
6 March 2001	Stuttgart	Germany	Hanns-Martin-Schleyer-Halle	Doyle Bramhall II & Smokestack		—N/a
8 March 2001	Cologne	Germany	Kölnarena	Doyle Bramhall II & Smokestack		—N/a
9 March 2001	Frankfurt	Germany	Festhalle Frankfurt	Doyle Bramhall II & Smokestack		—N/a
20 March 2001	Paris	France	Palais Omnisports de Paris-Bercy	Doyle Bramhall II & Smokestack		—N/a
21 March 2001	Paris	France	Palais Omnisports de Paris-Bercy	Doyle Bramhall II & Smokestack		—N/a
23 March 2001	Ghent	Belgium	Flanders Expo	Doyle Bramhall II & Smokestack	12,000	—N/a
25 March 2001	Rotterdam	Netherlands	Ahoy Hall Rotterdam	Doyle Bramhall II & Smokestack	—N/a	—N/a
26 March 2001	Rotterdam	Netherlands	Ahoy Hall Rotterdam	Doyle Bramhall II & Smokestack	—N/a	—N/a
28 March 2001	Copenhagen	Denmark	The Forum Copenhagen	Doyle Bramhall II & Smokestack	13,600	—N/a
29 March 2001	Copenhagen	Denmark	The Forum Copenhagen	Doyle Bramhall II & Smokestack	13,600	—N/a
31 March 2001	Gothenburg	Sweden	Scandinavium	Doyle Bramhall II & Smokestack	9,000	—N/a
1 April 2001	Oslo	Norway	Oslo Spektrum	Doyle Bramhall II & Smokestack	7,000	—N/a
3 April 2001	Stockholm	Sweden	Ericsson Globe	Doyle Bramhall II & Smokestack	12,000	—N/a
5 April 2001	Helsinki	Finland	Hartwall Arena	Doyle Bramhall II & Smokestack	18,000	—N/a
6 April 2001	Helsinki	Finland	Hartwall Arena	Doyle Bramhall II & Smokestack	18,000	—N/a
8 April 2001	Saint Petersburg	Russia	The Ice Palace	Doyle Bramhall II & Smokestack	—N/a	—N/a
10 April 2001	Moscow	Russia	Kremlin Convention Centre	Doyle Bramhall II & Smokestack	—N/a	—N/a
11 April 2001	Moscow	Russia	Kremlin Convention Centre	Doyle Bramhall II & Smokestack	—N/a	—N/a
North America
10 May 2001	Dallas	United States	Reunion Arena	Doyle Bramhall II & Smokestack	—N/a	—N/a
12 May 2001	San Antonio	United States	Alamo Dome	Doyle Bramhall II & Smokestack	—N/a	—N/a
14 May 2001	Houston	United States	Compaq Center	Doyle Bramhall II & Smokestack	—N/a	—N/a
15 May 2001	New Orleans	United States	New Orleans Arena	Doyle Bramhall II & Smokestack	—N/a	—N/a
18 May 2001	Sunrise	United States	National Car Rental Center	Doyle Bramhall II & Smokestack	—N/a	—N/a
19 May 2001	Tampa	United States	Ice Palace Arena	Doyle Bramhall II & Smokestack	—N/a	—N/a
21 May 2001	Atlanta	United States	Philips Arena	Doyle Bramhall II & Smokestack	—N/a	—N/a
22 May 2001	Memphis	United States	The Pyramid	Doyle Bramhall II & Smokestack	—N/a	—N/a
24 May 2001	Nashville	United States	Gaylord Entertainment Center	Doyle Bramhall II & Smokestack	—N/a	—N/a
25 May 2001	Charlotte	United States	Charlotte Coliseum	Doyle Bramhall II & Smokestack	—N/a	—N/a
27 May 2001	Washington, D.C.	United States	MCI Center	Doyle Bramhall II & Smokestack	—N/a	—N/a
30 May 2001	State College	United States	Bryce Jordan Center	Doyle Bramhall II & Smokestack	—N/a	—N/a
1 June 2001	Columbus	United States	Nationwide Arena	Doyle Bramhall II & Smokestack	—N/a	—N/a
2 June 2001	Indianapolis	United States	Conseco Fieldhouse	Doyle Bramhall II & Smokestack	—N/a	—N/a
4 June 2001	Cleveland	United States	Gund Arena	Doyle Bramhall II & Smokestack	—N/a	—N/a
6 June 2001	Auburn Hills	United States	Palace of Auburn Hills	Doyle Bramhall II & Smokestack	—N/a	—N/a
9 June 2001	Toronto	Canada	Air Canada Centre	Doyle Bramhall II & Smokestack	—N/a	—N/a
11 June 2001	Boston	United States	Fleet Center	Doyle Bramhall II & Smokestack	—N/a	—N/a
12 June 2001	Boston	United States	Fleet Center	Doyle Bramhall II & Smokestack	—N/a	—N/a
15 June 2001	Buffalo	United States	HSBC Arena	Doyle Bramhall II & Smokestack	—N/a	—N/a
16 June 2001	Albany	United States	Pepsi Arena	Doyle Bramhall II & Smokestack	—N/a	—N/a
17 June 2001	Philadelphia	United States	First Union Center	Doyle Bramhall II & Smokestack	—N/a	—N/a
21 June 2001	New York	United States	Madison Square Garden	Doyle Bramhall II & Smokestack	—N/a	—N/a
22 June 2001	New York	United States	Madison Square Garden	Doyle Bramhall II & Smokestack	—N/a	—N/a
23 June 2001	New York	United States	Madison Square Garden	Doyle Bramhall II & Smokestack	—N/a	—N/a
17 July 2001	St. Paul	United States	Xcel Energy Center	Doyle Bramhall II & Smokestack	—N/a	—N/a
19 July 2001	Fargo	United States	Fargo Dome	Doyle Bramhall II & Smokestack	—N/a	—N/a
21 July 2001	Milwaukee	United States	Bradley Center	Doyle Bramhall II & Smokestack	—N/a	—N/a
22 July 2001	St. Louis	United States	Savvis Center	Doyle Bramhall II & Smokestack	—N/a	—N/a
24 July 2001	Chicago	United States	United Center	Doyle Bramhall II & Smokestack	—N/a	—N/a
25 July 2001	Chicago	United States	United Center	Doyle Bramhall II & Smokestack	—N/a	—N/a
27 July 2001	Moline	United States	Mark of the Quad Cities	Doyle Bramhall II & Smokestack	—N/a	—N/a
28 July 2001	Kansas City	United States	Kemper Arena	Doyle Bramhall II & Smokestack	—N/a	—N/a
30 July 2001	Denver	United States	Pepsi Center	Doyle Bramhall II & Smokestack	—N/a	—N/a
1 August 2001	Salt Lake City	United States	Delta Center	Doyle Bramhall II & Smokestack	—N/a	—N/a
2 August 2001	Nampa	United States	Idaho Center	Doyle Bramhall II & Smokestack	—N/a	—N/a
4 August 2001	Seattle	United States	KeyArena	Doyle Bramhall II & Smokestack	—N/a	—N/a
5 August 2001	Vancouver	Canada	General Motors Place	Doyle Bramhall II & Smokestack	—N/a	—N/a
7 August 2001	Portland	United States	Rose Garden Arena	Doyle Bramhall II & Smokestack	—N/a	—N/a
10 August 2001	Sacramento	United States	ARCO Arena	Doyle Bramhall II & Smokestack	—N/a	—N/a
11 August 2001	Oakland	United States	Oakland Arena	Doyle Bramhall II & Smokestack	—N/a	—N/a
13 August 2001	Las Vegas	United States	Thomas & Mack Center	Doyle Bramhall II & Smokestack	—N/a	—N/a
15 August 2001	Phoenix	United States	American West Arena	Doyle Bramhall II & Smokestack	—N/a	—N/a
17 August 2001	Los Angeles	United States	Staples Center	Doyle Bramhall II & Smokestack	—N/a	—N/a
18 August 2001	Los Angeles	United States	Staples Center	Doyle Bramhall II & Smokestack	—N/a	—N/a
South America
4 October 2001	Santiago	Chile	Estadio Nacional	Miguel "Botafogo" Vilanova	—N/a	—N/a
6 October 2001	Buenos Aires	Argentina	Estadio River Plate	La Mississippi Blues Band & Memphis La Blusera	—N/a	—N/a
8 October 2001	Montevideo	Uruguay	Cilindro Municipal	—N/a	—N/a	—N/a
10 October 2001	Porto Alegre	Brazil	Estadio Olimpico	Robert Frejat	—N/a	—N/a
11 October 2001	São Paulo	Brazil	Estadio do Pacaembu	Robert Frejat	—N/a	—N/a
13 October 2001	Rio de Janeiro	Brazil	Praca de Apoteose	Robert Frejat	—N/a	—N/a
16 October 2001	Caracas	Venezuela	Estacionamiento del Poliedro	Biella Da Costa	—N/a	—N/a
19 October 2001	Mexico City	Mexico	Foro Sol	Toto	—N/a	—N/a
Asia
19 November 2001	Osaka	Japan	Osaka-Jo Hall	—N/a	—N/a	—N/a
21 November 2001	Osaka	Japan	Osaka-Jo Hall	—N/a	—N/a	—N/a
22 November 2001	Osaka	Japan	Osaka-Jo Hall	—N/a	—N/a	—N/a
24 November 2001	Nagoya	Japan	Aichiken Taiikukan	—N/a	—N/a	—N/a
26 November 2001	Fukuoka	Japan	Marine Messe	—N/a	—N/a	—N/a
28 November 2001	Tokyo	Japan	Nippon Budokan	—N/a	—N/a	—N/a
29 November 2001	Tokyo	Japan	Nippon Budokan	—N/a	—N/a	—N/a
30 November 2001	Tokyo	Japan	Nippon Budokan	—N/a	—N/a	—N/a
3 December 2001	Tokyo	Japan	Nippon Budokan	—N/a	—N/a	—N/a
4 December 2001	Tokyo	Japan	Nippon Budokan	—N/a	—N/a	—N/a
5 December 2001	Tokyo	Japan	Nippon Budokan	—N/a	—N/a	—N/a
8 December 2001	Sendai	Japan	Grande 21	—N/a	—N/a	—N/a
10 December 2001	Tokyo	Japan	Nippon Budokan	—N/a	—N/a	—N/a
11 December 2001	Tokyo	Japan	Nippon Budokan	—N/a	—N/a	—N/a
14 December 2001	Yokohama	Japan	Yokohama Arena	—N/a	—N/a	—N/a
15 December 2001	Yokohama	Japan	Yokohama Arena	—N/a	—N/a	—N/a

== Cancelled Shows ==
List of cancelled concerts, showing date, city, country, venue and reason for cancellation
Date	City	Country	Venue	Reason
7 February 2001	London	England	Royal Albert Hall	Sore throat and cold
