= Okie (J. J. Cale album) =

Studio album by J. J. Cale
- Released: April 30, 1974
- Recorded: May 7 – December 5, 1973
- Studios: Bradley's Barn (Mount Juliet, Tennessee) (tracks 1, 7, 10); Columbia Studio B (Nashville, Tennessee) (tracks 2, 3); Woodland (Nashville, Tennessee) (tracks 4, 6, 8, 12); Cale's House (Tulsa, Oklahoma) (tracks 5, 9, 11)
- Genres: Country; gospel
- Length: 29:08
- Labels: UK: A&M; USA: Shelter
- Producer: Audie Ashworth

J. J. Cale chronology
Really (1972)	Okie (1974)	Troubadour (1976)

Professional ratings
Review scores
Source	Rating
AllMusic	3/5 stars
Christgau's Record Guide	B−
Tom Hull	C

Okie is the third studio album by J. J. Cale, released on April 30, 1974.

== Background ==
After having Eric Clapton take his composition "After Midnight" to the Top 20 in 1970, Cale scored another windfall when Lynyrd Skynyrd recorded "Call Me the Breeze" for their 1974 LP Second Helping. Although Cale would not have the success with his music that others would, the royalties from artists covering his songs would allow him to record and tour as it suited him. As he put it in 2013, "I knew if I became too well known, my life would change drastically. On the other hand, getting some money doesn't change things too much, except you no longer have to go to work."

== Recording ==
Like his previous album Really, Okie was recorded in several different studios with producer Audie Ashworth. Okie is the first album where Cale layers his vocal tracks, something that would become one of the hallmarks of his sound. Cale later explained:

That goes back to the fact I never considered myself a good singer. I often sang off-key, and when you layer the vocals, the more times you put your voice on there, the more it becomes in tune. That's why when you hear a large group of people singing, the pitch always sounds right. Les Paul was the first person to do that, with Mary Ford. It makes the vocals more pleasing to the ear.

Musically, Okie covers a number of genres blended together in Cale's highly idiosyncratic sound, from the gospel standard "Precious Memories" to straight country on the Ray Price cover "I'll Be There If You Ever Want Me". "Any Way the Wind Blows" and "Cajun Moon" are examples of the sound Cale was establishing for himself, often referred to as the "Tulsa Sound", while the reggae-tinged opener "Crying" showed his willingness to explore new styles. The title track is the first of many instrumentals that would appear on future records, and according to the 2014 Oklahoma Music Hall of Fame bio on Cale, was recorded on the back porch of Cale's Tulsa home.

Okie contains some of Cale's most covered songs. In the same year of its release, Captain Beefheart and the Magic Band recorded "I Got the Same Old Blues" (shortened to "Same Old Blues") for the Bluejeans & Moonbeams LP, one of the few covers to ever appear on a Beefheart album. The song would also be recorded by Eric Clapton, Bobby Bland, Lynyrd Skynyrd, and Bryan Ferry. "Cajun Moon" was recorded by Herbie Mann on his 1976 album Surprises with vocals by Cissy Houston, by Poco on their album Cowboys & Englishmen, and by Randy Crawford on Naked and True (1995). In a 2013 interview Cale singled out jazz vocalist Crawford's version as his favorite rendition of the song, and he also listed this cover as one of his favorite takes of the other artists' of his songs. "Anyway the Wind Blows" was covered by Brother Phelps in 1995 and Bill Wyman's Rhythm Kings in 1999, and Cale would re-record the song himself for his 2006 album with Clapton, The Road to Escondido. "I'd Like to Love You, Baby" was covered by Tom Petty & The Heartbreakers in 2003, appearing on their 2009 album, The Live Anthology, in addition to appearing on Waylon Jennings' 2025 posthumous release, Songbird.

== Track listing ==
All tracks are written by J. J. Cale, except where noted.

No.	Title	Writer(s)	Length
1.	"Crying"		2:35
2.	"I'll Be There (If You Ever Want Me)"	Rusty Gabbard, Ray Price	2:24
3.	"Starbound"		1:58
4.	"Rock and Roll Records"		2:10
5.	"The Old Man and Me"		2:06
6.	"Everlovin' Woman"		2:12
7.	"Cajun Moon"		2:14
8.	"I'd Like to Love You Baby"		2:52
9.	"Anyway the Wind Blows"		3:24
10.	"Precious Memories"	J.B.F. Wright	2:11
11.	"Okie"		1:57
12.	"I Got the Same Old Blues"		2:59

== Personnel ==
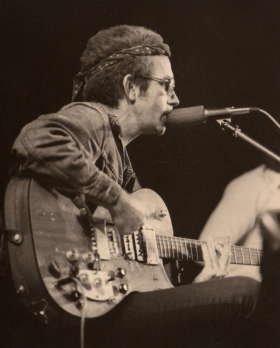
Cale in 1975

Tracks 1, 7, 10

(20 November 1973; Bradley's Barn, Mount Juliet, Tennessee)

- Mike Leech - bass
- Joel Green - bass (7)
- Kenny Malone - drums
- Farrell Morris - percussion & Vibraphone ( tr.10 )
- Reggie Young - electric guitar
- J. J. Cale - guitar, vocals
- Beegie Cruzer – electric keyboards
- Red Spive - piano

Tracks 2, 3

(10 May 1973: Columbia Studio B, Nashville, Tennessee)

- Tommy Cogbill - bass
- Karl Himmel - drums
- Jerry Smith - El. piano
- Harold Bradley - rhythm guitar
- Grady Martin - electric guitar
- J. J. Cale - slide guitar, vocals
- George Tidwell - trumpet
- Dennis Goode - trombone
- Billy Pruett - saxophone

Tracks 4, 8

(7 May 1973: Woodland Studio B, Nashville, Tennessee)

- J. J. Cale - guitar, vocals
- Tim Drummond - bass
- Karl Himmel - drums
- Jerry Whitehurst - keyboards
- George Tidwell - trumpet
- Dennis Goode - trombone
- Billy Pruett - saxophone

Track 5

(5 December 1973: J. J. Cale's House, Tulsa, Oklahoma)

- Audie Ashworth - engineer
- Joel Green - bass
- Terry Perkins - drums
- Paul Davis - guitar
- J. J. Cale - guitar, vocals
- Weldon Myrick - steel guitar

Tracks 6, 12

(Track 6: 10 July 1973; Track 12: 9 July 1973: J. J. Cale's House, Tulsa, Oklahoma)

- Tommy Cogbill - bass
- Kenny Malone - drums
- Hargus "Pig" Robbins - electric piano
- Mac Gayden - guitar, slide guitar (12)

Track 9

(4 October 1973: J. J. Cale's House, Tulsa, Oklahoma)

- Joel Green - bass
- Terry Perkins - drums
- Audie Ashworth - engineer
- Paul Davis - guitar
- J.J. Cale - guitar, vocals

Track 11

(2 August 1973: J. J. Cale's House, Tulsa, Oklahoma)

- Joel Green - bass
- Terry Perkins - drums
- Audie Ashworth - engineer
- Paul Davis - guitar
- J.J. Cale - guitar
