= Really (album) =

Studio album by J. J. Cale
- Released: December 4, 1972
- Recorded: April–July 1972
- Studios: Muscle Shoals Sound Studio, Muscle Shoals, Alabama (track 1); Quadrophonic Studio, Nashville Tennessee (tracks 2–4); Quinvy Studio, Muscle Shoals, Alabama (tracks 5,9); Bradley's Barn, Mount Juliet, Tennessee (tracks 6,7,10,12); Moss Rose Studio, Nashville Tennessee (tracks 8,11)
- Length: 30:55
- Labels: UK: A&M; US: Shelter
- Producer: Audie Ashworth

J. J. Cale chronology
Naturally (1971)	Really (1972)	Okie (1974)

Really is the second studio album by J. J. Cale, released on December 4, 1972.

== Background ==
After several years in California working as an engineer in Leon Russell's studio, Cale returned home to Oklahoma gigging in obscurity when Eric Clapton recorded the arrangement of "After Midnight" that Cale had released as a B-side to a Liberty single in 1966. The song became a hit in 1970 and put Cale on the map as a songwriter. He recorded his debut album, Naturally, in 1971, which included a slower version of "After Midnight" and the minor hit single "Crazy Mama", which rose to number 22 on the US single chart. Already wary of stardom, Cale toured and recorded at his own pace throughout the decade, oblivious to trends and eschewing publicity.

== Recording ==
Really was produced by Audie Ashworth, who continued to produce Cale until 1983. Cale's second album further developed the "Tulsa sound" that he became known for: a swampy mix of folk, jazz, shuffling country blues, and rock ‘n’ roll. Although his songs have a relaxed, casual feel, Cale, who often used drum machines and layered his vocals, carefully crafted his albums, explaining to Lydia Hutchinson in 2013, "I was an engineer, and I loved manipulating the sound. I love the technical side of recording. I had a recording studio back in the days when no one had a home studio. You had to rent a studio that belonged to a big conglomerate." Cale was very proud that bluegrass musicians Uncle Josh Graves and Vassar Clements played on Really, later recalling to Derek Halsey of Swampland.com in 2004, "That was one of the highlights of my life, man. We recorded that out at Bradley's Barn, and I was a big fan of Lester Flatt and Earl Scruggs. And, of course, Josh was the Dobro player on that stuff, and Vassar was 'Mister bluegrass fiddle player', and both of those guys came out to the studio and played that day. They were like Buddy Emmons in the studio; they were so good you just kind of quit playing and dug what they were playing." Cale's guitar work is impressive on Really, with William Ruhlmann of AllMusic commenting that it "manages to be both understated and intense here. The same is true of his seemingly offhand singing, which finds him drawling lines like 'You get your gun, I'll get mine' with disarming casualness." Cale covers Don Nix's rock and roll classic "Goin' Down" and gives a jazzy treatment to Muddy Waters' blues standard "Got My Mojo Working", which is simply called "Mojo".

In 2009, the album was re-released with Naturally as a French exclusive 24-track 2-CD album set, as part of Universal Records' '2 For 1' series.

== Reception ==
Professional ratings
Review scores
Source	Rating
AllMusic	3/5 stars
Christgau's Record Guide	B
Rolling Stone	(favorable)

AllMusic: "...for some, his approach will be too casual; there are many times, when the band is percolating along and Cale is muttering into the microphone, that the music seems to be all background and no foreground. You may find yourself waiting for a payoff that never comes."

== Track listing ==
All tracks are written by J. J. Cale unless otherwise indicated.

No.	Title	Writer(s)	Length
1.	"Lies"		2:56
2.	"Everything Will Be Alright"		3:15
3.	"I'll Kiss the World Goodbye"		1:47
4.	"Changes"		2:25
5.	"Right Down Here"		3:14
6.	"If You're Ever in Oklahoma"		2:06
7.	"Ridin' Home"		2:39
8.	"Goin' Down"	Don Nix	3:00
9.	"Soulin'"		2:19
10.	"Playing in the Street"		1:51
11.	"Mojo"	McKinley Morganfield	2:29
12.	"Louisiana Women"		2:56

== Personnel ==
- J. J. Cale – lead guitar, voice (tr. 1, 6, 10–12), rhythm-guitar (tr. 5, 9), voice, bass, piano, drums, guitar (tr. 7), voice, electric piano, lead guitar (tr. 8)
- Barry Beckett – electric piano (tr. 1)
- Bill Boatman – rhythm guitar (tr. 8), guitar (tr. 11)
- David Briggs – piano (tr. 3)
- Kenneth A. Buttrey – drums (tr. 3)
- Jimmy Capps – rhythm-guitar (tr. 5, 6, 10, 12)
- Vassar Clements – violin (tr. 6, 10, 12)
- Kossie Gardner – organ (tr. 5)
- Mac Gayden – lead guitar (tr. 5), slide-guitar (tr. 9)
- Gary Gilmore – bass guitar (tr. 8, 11)
- Josh Graves – dobro (tr. 6, 12)
- Roger Hawkins – drums (tr. 1)
- Bob Holmes – horn arrangement (tr. 1)
- David Hood – bass guitar (tr. 1)
- Bill Humble – trombone (tr. 1)
- Jimmy Johnson – rhythm-guitar (tr. 1)
- Jimmy Karstein – drums (tr. 8, 11)
- Charlie McCoy – harmonica (tr. 7)
- Farrell Morris – drums (tr. 2), congas (tr. 4, 12, 12), percussion (tr. 6, 10)
- Bob Phillips, Don Sheffield – trumpet (tr. 1, 5)
- Norbert Putnam – bass guitar (tr. 2, 3, 4)
- Bob Ray – bass guitar (tr. 5, 9)
- Norman Ray – saxophone (Baritone) (tr. 1), vocals
- Don Sheffield – trumpet
- George Soulé – drums (tr. 5, 9)
- Robert Tarrant – congas (tr. 5), tambourine (tr. 9)
- Bobby Woods – piano (tr. 2, 4)
- Joe Zinkan – bass guitar (tr. 6, 10, 12)
- Joann Sweeney – voice (tr. 1)
