= Larger than Life (Freddie King album) =

Live album (with studio tracks) by Freddie King
- Released: 1975
- Studio: Armadillo World Headquarters
- Genre: Blues
- Label: RSO
- Producer: Mike Vernon

Freddie King chronology
The Best of Freddie King (1975)	Larger than Life (1975)	Freddie King 1934–1976 (1977)

Larger than Life is an album by the American musician Freddie King, released in 1975. He supported it with a North American tour.

== Production ==
Most of the album was recorded in April 1975 at Armadillo World Headquarters, in Austin, over three nights. Other tracks were produced by Mike Vernon, in Hollywood, which King did not care for. Andrew "Jr. Boy" Jones played guitar on the album, his first appearance on record. Bobby Tench also played guitar on some tracks. David "Fathead" Newman contributed on saxophone; Pete Wingfield played piano. "Woke Up This Morning" is a version of the B. B. King song. "Meet Me in the Morning" was written by Bob Dylan. "You Can Run but You Can't Hide" is a cover of the Paul Butterfield song. "Boogie Bump", one of the album's singles, was influenced by disco.

== Critical reception ==
Professional ratings
Review scores
Source	Rating
The Encyclopedia of Popular Music	3/5 stars
The Penguin Guide to Blues Recordings	2.5/4 stars
The New Rolling Stone Record Guide	3/5 stars

The Ann Arbor News concluded, "It's blues, but it's blues with a rock 'em and sock 'em feel, with plenty of Freddie's great driving vocals and his biting guitar." The Omaha World-Herald called the album "a powerful blues-soul amalgam". The Lincoln Journal Star praised the "flash-fried guitar solos".

The New Rolling Stone Record Guide called Larger than Life "a barrelhousing live-in-Texas epitaph."

== Track listing ==
Side one

1. "It's Better to Have (And Don't Need)"
2. "You Can Run but You Can't Hide"
3. "Woke Up This Morning"
4. "It's Your Move"
5. "Boogie Bump"

Side two

1. "Meet Me in the Morning"
2. "The Things I Used to Do"
3. "Ain't That I Don't Love You"
4. "Have You Ever Loved a Woman"
