= One More Car, One More Rider =

Live album by Eric Clapton
- Released: 5 November 2002
- Recorded: 18 & 19 August 2001
- Venues: Staples Center (Los Angeles, California)
- Genres: Rock, blues
- Length: 116:33
- Label: Duck / Reprise
- Producers: Eric Clapton, Simon Climie

Eric Clapton chronology
Reptile (2001)	One More Car, One More Rider (2002)	Me and Mr. Johnson (2004)

Professional ratings
Review scores
Source	Rating
AllMusic	2/5 stars
Rolling Stone	3/5 stars

One More Car, One More Rider is the eighth live album by Eric Clapton, released on 5 November 2002 on Duck / Reprise Records. It is also his third double live album. The album contains songs performed during Clapton's 2001 world tour. The recordings on this album are from two nights at the Staples Center in Los Angeles, 18 & 19 August 2001. Accompanying Clapton on this album are guitarist Andy Fairweather-Low, drummer Steve Gadd, bassist Nathan East and keyboardists Billy Preston, Greg Phillinganes and David Sancious (who also plays guitar and melodica). Clapton claimed that this would be his last world tour, making this album initially more valuable. However, he has since toured the world several times, both on his own and with Steve Winwood.

There is also a DVD version of this album. The DVD features "Will It Go Round in Circles" sung by Billy Preston, which is not included on the CD. The DVD was directed by Brian Lockwood and Danny O'Bryen.

The album was released on vinyl for the first time on Record Store Day in 2019, on Limited Edition 3-LP clear vinyl. The first four songs of the CD were on side one, with four songs on each of the other five sides of the three albums, the full 19 songs from the 2-CD set appearing across the six sides.

== Track listing (CD) ==
=== Disc One ===
Acoustic:

1. "Key to the Highway" (Big Bill Broonzy, Charles Segar) – 3:41
2. "Reptile" (Eric Clapton) – 5:59
3. "Got You on My Mind" (Howard Biggs, Joe Thomas) – 3:51
4. "Tears in Heaven" (Clapton, Will Jennings) – 4:34
5. "Bell Bottom Blues" (Eric Clapton, Bobby Whitlock) – 5:02
6. "Change the World" (Gordon Kennedy, Wayne Kirkpatrick, Tommy Sims) – 6:16

Electric:

1. "My Father's Eyes" (Clapton) – 8:34
2. "River of Tears" (Clapton, Simon Climie) – 8:59
3. "Going Down Slow" (Saint Louis Jimmy) – 5:34
4. "She's Gone" (Clapton, Climie) – 6:58

=== Disc Two ===
Electric:

1. "I Want a Little Girl" (Murray Mencher, Billy Moll) – 4:38
2. "Badge" (Clapton, George Harrison) – 6:02
3. "Hoochie Coochie Man" (Willie Dixon) – 4:30
4. "Have You Ever Loved a Woman" (Billy Myles) – 7:53
5. "Cocaine" (J. J. Cale) – 4:20
6. "Wonderful Tonight" (Clapton) – 6:42
7. "Layla" (Clapton, Jim Gordon) – 9:16
8. "Sunshine of Your Love" (Jack Bruce, Clapton, Pete Brown) – 7:11

Acoustic:

1. "Over the Rainbow" (Harold Arlen, E. Y. Harburg) – 6:33

== Track listing (DVD) ==
1. "Key to the Highway" (Broonzy, Segar) – 3:41
2. "Reptile" (Eric Clapton) – 5:59
3. "Got You on My Mind" (Biggs, Thomas) – 3:51
4. "Tears in Heaven" (Clapton, Will Jennings) – 4:34
5. "Bell Bottom Blues" (Clapton) – 5:02
6. "Change the World" (Gordon Kennedy, Wayne Kirkpatrick, Tommy Sims) – 6:16
7. "My Father's Eyes" (Clapton) – 8:34
8. "River of Tears" (Clapton, Simon Climie) – 8:59
9. "Going Down Slow" (Saint Louis Jimmy) – 5:34
10. "She's Gone" (Clapton, Climie) – 6:58
11. "I Want a Little Girl" (Mencher, Moll) – 4:38
12. "Badge" (Clapton, George Harrison) – 6:02
13. "(I'm Your) Hoochie Coochie Man" (Willie Dixon) – 4:30
14. "Have You Ever Loved a Woman" (Billy Myles) – 7:53
15. "Cocaine" (J. J. Cale) – 4:20
16. "Wonderful Tonight" (Clapton) – 6:42
17. "Layla" (Clapton, Jim Gordon) – 9:16
18. "Will It Go Round in Circles" (Billy Preston) – 3:31
19. "Sunshine of Your Love" (Pete Brown, Jack Bruce, Clapton) – 7:11
20. "Over the Rainbow" (Harold Arlen, E. Y. Harburg) – 6:33

== Personnel ==
- Eric Clapton – guitar, lead vocals
- Andy Fairweather-Low – guitar, backing vocals
- Billy Preston – Hammond B-3 organ, keyboards, lead vocals (Will It Go Around In Circles?) backing vocals (Going Down Slow)
- David Sancious – piano, keyboards, saxophone, melodica, backing vocals
- Greg Phillinganes - Hammond B-3 organ, keyboards/synthesizers
- Nathan East – bass guitar, backing vocals
- Steve Gadd – drums

== Chart positions ==
=== Weekly charts ===
Chart (2002–03)	Peak position
Austrian Albums (Ö3 Austria)	37
Belgian Albums (Ultratop Wallonia)	37
Danish Music DVD (Hitlisten)	5
French Albums (SNEP)	73
German Albums (Offizielle Top 100)	21
Italian Albums (FIMI)	33
Japanese Albums (Oricon)	9
Norwegian Albums (VG-lista)	15
Scottish Albums (Official Charts)	79
Swedish Albums (Sverigetopplistan)	40
Swedish Music DVD (Sverigetopplistan)	1
Swiss Albums (Schweizer Hitparade)	26
UK Albums (Official Charts)	69
US Billboard 200	43
US Top Internet Albums (Billboard)	102
US Top Music Videos (Billboard)	8

== Certifications ==
Region	Certification	Certified units/sales
Brazil (Pro-Música Brasil)	Gold	50,000^{*}
Video sales
Argentina (CAPIF)	2× Platinum	16,000^{^}
Brazil (Pro-Música Brasil)	Gold	25,000^{*}
Denmark (IFPI Danmark)	Gold	25,000^{^}
Sweden (GLF)	Gold	10,000^{^}
United States (RIAA)	Platinum	100,000^{^}
^{*} Sales figures based on certification alone.^{^} Shipments figures based on certification alone.
