= Woman Across the River =

Studio album by Freddie King
- Released: 1973
- Recorded: 1973
- Genres: Blues, Texas blues
- Length: 39:04
- Label: Shelter
- Producer: Leon Russell

Freddie King chronology
Texas Cannonball (1972)	Woman Across the River (1973)	Burglar (1974)

Woman Across the River is an album by the American blues musician Freddie King, released in 1973. It was the last of three albums King made for Shelter Records. King's three Shelter albums were re-released as a collection titled King of the Blues. The album peaked at No. 158 on the Billboard 200.

== Production ==
Like King's first two Shelter albums, Woman Across the River was produced by label head Leon Russell. King was backed by many session musicians, including Carl Radle on bass and Jim Keltner on drums. The album was mixed at Ardent Studios, in Memphis, Tennessee. King covered two Willie Dixon songs, "Hoochie Coochie Man" and "I'm Ready".

== Critical reception ==
Professional ratings
Review scores
Source	Rating
AllMusic	3/5 stars
The Encyclopedia of Popular Music	3/5 stars
The Gazette	C+
MusicHound Rock: The Essential Album Guide	3.5/5 stars

The Gazette called the album "painfully mechanical, with little or no personal involvement."

Texas Monthly called the album "more than competent," but thought that it made "a few too many concessions to the rock sound." AllMusic noted the "perhaps heavier rock elements," writing that "King's last Shelter album was his most elaborately produced, with occasional string arrangements and female backups vocals." The Penguin Guide to Blues Recordings opined that it "reflects the awkward phase blues was going through in the early '70s." The Commercial Appeal praised the "exquisite Russell ballad" "Help Me Through the Day".

== Track listing ==
No.	Title	Writer(s)	Length
1.	"Woman Across the River"	Bettye Crutcher, Allen Jones	2:46
2.	"Hootchie Cootchie Man"	Willie Dixon	4:48
3.	"Danger Zone"	Percy Mayfield	4:32
4.	"Boogie Man"	Chuck Blackwell, Leon Russell	3:45
5.	"Leave My Woman Alone"	Ray Charles	3:33
6.	"Just a Little Bit"	Ralph Bass, Buster Brown, John Thornton, Fats Washington	2:27
7.	"Yonder Wall"	Elmore James	2:25
8.	"Help Me Through the Day"	Russell	4:27
9.	"I'm Ready"	Dixon	3:45
10.	"Trouble in Mind"	Richard M. Jones	3:41
11.	"You Don't Have to Go"	Jimmy Reed	2:55
