= Naturally (J. J. Cale album) =

Studio album by J. J. Cale
- Released: October 25, 1971
- Recorded: September 29, 1970 – June 9, 1971
- Studios: Bradley's Barn, Mount Juliet, Tennessee; Moss Rose, Nashville, Tennessee
- Genre: Country rock
- Length: 31:41
- Labels: UK: A&M; USA: Shelter
- Producer: Audie Ashworth

J. J. Cale chronology
Naturally (1971)	Really (1972)

Singles from Naturally
- 1. "Magnolia" Released: 1971; 2. "Crazy Mama" Released: 1971; 3. "After Midnight" Released: 1972

Naturally is the debut studio album by J. J. Cale, released on October 25, 1971.

== Background ==
J.J. Cale, who grew up in Oklahoma, first gained recognition in 1964 when singer Mel McDaniel released a regional hit covering Cale's song "Lazy Me" and became a hit. Cale later moved to California to work as chief engineer at Leon Russell's home and began performing at venues such as Whisky a Go Go. Due to the existence of Johnny Rivers as a regular performer, and to avoid confusion with John Cale of the Velvet Underground, club co-owner Elmer Valentine suggested that Cale be renamed "J.J. Cale".

In 1966, Cale released a single called "Slow Motion" on Liberty Records, which was not a commercial success. However, its B-side, "After Midnight", later became a major influence on Cale's career, as Eric Clapton recorded a cover version of the song in 1970 and it reached the top 20 of the Hot Singles chart. Cale did not know about Clapton's recording of "After Midnight" until he heard it on the radio when it became a radio hit that year. Cale later recalled in an interview with Mojo magazine that during this time he was facing significant financial challenges in his 30s, and that the unexpected success of the song provided him with vital financial stability. With the new success of "After Midnight", encouraged by his friend and producer Audie Ashworth, Cale began recording the entire album.

== Recording ==
Naturally builds the basic musical framework of the Tulsa sound, and has delicate drum arrangements, deep vocals within a limited vocal range, and guitar technique that combines basic country chord progressions, blues scale improvisation and jazz harmonic thinking. Among them, songs such as "Call Me the Breeze" were recorded with primitive drum machine accompaniment and sound almost like demos.

In 2004, Cale explained to Dan Forte of Vintage Guitar:

When we did the first album, most people didn't realize that was an electric drum machine – or that there even was such a thing. I didn't use a real drummer because I had no money. So I cut "Crazy Mama" and "Call Me The Breeze", and Carl Radle came in and played bass, and Mac Gayden played slide on "Crazy Mama". Then Audie hired some musicians and a real studio, and we cut the other eight songs on Naturally.

The album showcased Cale's distinctive, understated style, and it successfully established his solo recording career.

Cale's version of "After Midnight" differs greatly from Clapton's frenetic version, which is itself based on Cale's original Liberty Records arrangement. The Oklahoma Troubadour explained in 2004:

The history on that deal was, the original "After Midnight" I recorded was on Liberty Records on a 45-rpm, and it was fast. That was about 1967-68, maybe 69. I can't remember exactly. But that was the original "After Midnight", and that is what Clapton heard. If you listen to Eric Clapton's record, what he did was imitate that. No one heard that first version I made of it. I tried to give the thing away, until he cut it and made it popular. So, when I recorded the Naturally album Denny Cordell, who ran Shelter Records at the time, and I had already finished the album, he said, "John, why don't you put 'After Midnight' on there because that is what people recognize you for?" I said, "Well, I've already got that on Liberty Records, and Eric Clapton's already cut it, so if I'm going to do it again I'm going to do it slow.

In the 2005 documentary To Tulsa and Back, Cale admitted, "I wasn't real crazy about the Naturally album and I'm still not, but most of the people who like my music, J.J. Cale fans, really like the Naturally album. I think what they liked really was the songs." In the same documentary, Cale recalls producer and agent Audie Ashworth calling him saying if he appeared on Dick Clark's American Bandstand, the single "Crazy Mama" would jump into the Top 10 on the charts, but Cale refused when he learned he would have to lip sync to the recording of the song. While "Crazy Mama" nearly cracked the Top 20, Cale was unimpressed with fame right from the beginning, telling Steve Newton of The Georgia Straight in 1990:

The first album was a collection of tunes I'd been working on for about 32 years. It was a collection that refined everything that had come out of me and weeded out all the bad ideas I'd had over 20 years. But, when it was successful, the record company wanted the next album in six months. When you get successful, the money comes in and pretty soon you've got to hire an accountant, you've got to get up early, and then you've got a day job. Pretty soon, I wasn't enjoying life – all I was doing was working.

In 2009 the album was re-released, together with Cale's second studio album Really, as a French exclusive 24-track 2-CD album set, part of Universal Records' "2 For 1" series.

== Reception ==
Professional ratings
Review scores
Source	Rating
AllMusic	3.5/5 stars
Christgau's Record Guide	B

The album contained the 1972 hits "Crazy Mama" (#22 on the Billboard Hot 100, his only Top 40 hit) and "After Midnight" (#42) as well as turntable hits "Bringing it Back" (recorded by Kansas for their first album), "Call Me the Breeze" (later recorded by Lynyrd Skynyrd), and "Clyde" (later recorded by Dr. Hook & the Medicine Show and a 1980 country hit for Waylon Jennings). "Crazy Mama" was actually the B-side of the single, "Magnolia", but a DJ in Little Rock, Arkansas played it in preference to the A-side, facilitating its success. Reviewing the LP for Rolling Stone in 1972, Jon Landau said, "This quiet and leisurely album from an excellent guitarist, vocalist, and songwriter is a charmer. J.J. Cale has a unique approach to funk, blues, and country and all it involves is taking things at just as relaxed and mellow a pace as the human metabolism will allow. Here it results in one of the most enjoyable debut albums heard in some time." Village Voice critic Robert Christgau was less receptive to the "lassitude affected" by Cale and his collaborators. In Christgau's Record Guide: Rock Albums of the Seventies (1981), he said that while "Call Me the Breeze" and "Crazy Mama" are "absolutely beguiling", the rest of the record's "murmured blues meditations are so easy on the spirit that even though they have their charms they invite the mistrust of moralizers like myself—there's just too much talent here to justify such slight results." Thom Owens of AllMusic later wrote that "Cale effortlessly captured a lazy, rolling boogie that contradicted all the commercial styles of boogie, blues, and country rock at the time" of the album's release.

== Track listing ==
All songs written by J. J. Cale.

Side one

1. "Call Me the Breeze" – 2:38
2. "Call the Doctor" – 2:26
3. "Don't Go to Strangers" – 2:22
4. "Woman I Love" – 2:40
5. "Magnolia" – 3:23
6. "Clyde" – 2:29

Side two

1. "Crazy Mama" – 2:31
2. "Nowhere to Run" – 2:26
3. "After Midnight" – 2:25
4. "River Runs Deep" – 2:42
5. "Bringing It Back" – 2:46
6. "Crying Eyes" – 3:15

== Personnel ==
=== Musicians ===
- J. J. Cale – guitar, vocals
- Karl Himmel – drums (A1, A2, A4–B2, B4–B6)
- Chuck Browning – drums (A3, B3)
- Tim Drummond – bass (A4–A6, B2, B5)
- Carl Radle – bass (A1, A2, B1, B4, B6)
- Norbert Putnam – bass (A3, B3)
- Bob Wilson – piano (A4–A6, B2, B5)
- David Briggs – piano, organ
- Jerry Whitehurst – piano
- Weldon Myrick – steel guitar (A1, A2, B1, B4)
- Buddy Spicher – fiddle
- Shorty Lavender – fiddle
- Walter Haynes – dobro
- Mac Gayden – slide guitar (B1, B4)
- Ed Colis – harmonica
- Diane Davidson – backing vocals

=== Production ===
- Cover artwork – Rabon
- Engineer – James Long

== Charts ==
Chart performance for Naturally
Chart (2026)	Peak position
Belgian Albums (Ultratop Flanders)	93

== Certifications ==
Certifications for Naturally
Region	Certification	Certified units/sales
United Kingdom (BPI)	Silver	60,000^{‡}
^{‡} Sales+streaming figures based on certification alone.
