= Getting Ready... =

Studio album by Freddie King
- Released: 1971
- Studio: Ter-Mar Chess
- Genres: Blues, rock
- Label: Shelter
- Producers: Leon Russell, Don Nix

Freddie King chronology
My Feeling for the Blues (1970)	Getting Ready... (1971)	Texas Cannonball (1972)

Getting Ready... is an album by the American musician Freddie King, released in 1971. It was the first of three albums he recorded for Shelter Records. The album contains "Going Down", which became one of King's most popular songs. King supported Getting Ready... with a North American tour.

== Production ==
Recorded at Ter-Mar Chess Studios and mixed at Ardent Studios, the album was produced by label head Leon Russell and Don Nix. King was backed by Russell on piano, Duck Dunn on bass, Chuck Blackwell on drums, and Don Preston on guitar, among others. King played a Gibson Les Paul; he thought his instrument sounded similar to a violin, as he often bended notes and avoided chords. The studio version of Big Bill Broonzy's "Key to the Highway" was performed in a more casual, groove-oriented style, rather than the rock style of most of King's live versions of the song. "Dust My Broom" is a cover of the Elmore James song. "Five Long Years" was written by Eddie Boyd. Jimmy Rogers, who also recorded for Shelter, composed "Walking by Myself".

== Critical reception ==
Professional ratings
Review scores
Source	Rating
AllMusic	3/5 stars
Los Angeles Times	2.5/5 stars
MusicHound Blues: The Essential Album Guide	4/5 stars
The Rolling Stone Album Guide	3.5/5 stars
The Virgin Encyclopedia of the Blues	4/5 stars

The News-Chronicle noted that King "is only an average vocalist ... slurring some of the lines to the point of indistinction, but what you are able to hear is good." The Reading Evening Post called the album "good solid blues that pushes along rather than rolls along." The Arizona Republic praised King's vocals on "Key to the Highway".

In 1989, the Los Angeles Times stated that the songs "provide a respectable showcase of King's feel for both rock and blues." In 1997, Guitar Player said that "Freddie is comfortable and in total command". The Penguin Guide to Blues Recordings opined that the Shelter albums reflect "the awkward phase blues was going through in the early '70s."

== Track listing ==
No.	Title	Writer(s)	Length
1.	"Same Old Blues"	Don Nix	3:57
2.	"Dust My Broom"	Elmore James	3:10
3.	"Worried Life Blues"	Big Maceo	2:50
4.	"Five Long Years"	Eddie Boyd	4:20
5.	"Key to the Highway"	Charles Seger, William Broonzy	3:24
6.	"Going Down"	Nix	3:21
7.	"Living on the Highway"	Nix, Leon Russell	4:14
8.	"Walking by Myself"	Lane	2:50
9.	"Tore Down"	Freddie King	4:09
10.	"Palace of the King"	Nix, Donald "Duck" Dunn, Russell	3:38

=== Notes ===
The back cover of the original LP credits the songwriter of "Worried Life Blues" as Big Maco (which may be a typo for Big Maceo). The label on the record lists the writer as Willie Dixon, and the song is titled "Worry My Life No More".

"Tore Down" is credited on the back cover to King; on the record label it is credited to Sonny Thompson and the song is titled "I'm Tore Down". The original Federal single released in 1961 is titled "I'm Tore Down", credited to Thompson, so the King credit may be in error.
