= Texas Cannonball =

Studio album by Freddie King
- Released: 1972
- Recorded: February 2–27, 1972
- Genres: Electric blues, Texas blues
- Length: 36:31
- Label: Shelter
- Producers: Leon Russell, Denny Cordell

Freddie King chronology
Getting Ready... (1971)	Texas Cannonball (1972)	Woman Across the River (1973)

Texas Cannonball is a studio album by the American musician Freddie King, released in 1972 by Shelter Records.

== Artwork ==
The album cover was created by the American artist Jim Franklin. It depicts King surrounded by a field of bluebonnets and leaping armadillos.

== Critical reception ==
Professional ratings
Review scores
Source	Rating
AllMusic	3/5 stars
The Encyclopedia of Popular Music	3/5 stars
MusicHound Rock: The Essential Album Guide	3.5/5 stars
The Rolling Stone Album Guide	3.5/5 stars

Reviewing a 1991 reissue of Texas Cannonball, The Commercial Appeal called the album "a masterpiece" and said that it is "full of dashing solos and some of [King's] finest vocals since his heyday in the late '50s and early '60s." In 2007, the Houston Chronicle listed it among the 75 essential Texas blues albums.

AllMusic critic Richie Unterberger wrote that the album was "similar to his first Shelter outing (Getting Ready), but with more of a rock feel."

== Track listing ==
Side one
No.	Title	Writer(s)	Length
1.	"Lowdown in Lodi"	John Fogerty	3:06
2.	"Reconsider Baby"	Lowell Fulson	3:57
3.	"Big Leg Woman (With a Short Short Mini Skirt)"	Israel Tolbert	3:52
4.	"Me and My Guitar"	Chuck Blackwell, Leon Russell	4:02
5.	"I'd Rather Be Blind"	Russell	3:45

Side two
No.	Title	Writer(s)	Length
1.	"Can't Trust Your Neighbor"	Isaac Hayes, David Porter	3:54
2.	"You Was Wrong"	Freddie King	3:45
3.	"How Many More Years"	Howlin' Wolf	3:25
4.	"Ain't No Sunshine"	Bill Withers	3:15
5.	"The Sky Is Crying"	Elmore James	3:24
