= Burglar (album) =

Studio album by Freddie King
- Released: 1974
- Studio: Chipping Norton, Oxfordshire, England; Criteria, Miami, Florida ("Sugar Sweet")
- Genre: Blues
- Length: 37:38
- Label: RSO
- Producer: Mike Vernon

Freddie King chronology
Woman Across the River (1973)	Burglar (1974)	The Best of Freddie King (1975)

Burglar is an album by the American musician Freddie King, released in 1974. King signed with RSO Records on the advice of Eric Clapton. King supported the album with a North American tour that included shows with Rush, among others. Burglar charted on Billboard's Soul LPs chart. In 2023, Lurrie Bell recorded an interpretation of the complete album.

== Production ==
The album was produced primarily by Mike Vernon, with Tom Dowd doing some work at Criteria Studios. Clapton played guitar on "Sugar Sweet"; he and his band recorded three other songs with King during the session, which were released later. Bobby Tench also contributed on guitar. King, who wrote two of the songs, added elements of pop and funk to his Texas blues sound. "Pack It Up" is a cover of the Gonzalez song. "She's a Burglar" was written by Jerry Ragovoy. "Pulp Wood" is an instrumental.

== Critical reception ==
Professional ratings
Review scores
Source	Rating
AllMusic	4/5 stars
The Penguin Guide to Blues Recordings	3/4 stars
The Virgin Encyclopedia of the Blues	3/5 stars

Billboard wrote that "King sings in his usual rough vocals but continues to let his fluid and graceful guitar do most of the talking." The Bracknell and Ascot Times praised King's "incomparable wailing, bending and soaring electric guitar and superb voice." The Hammersmith and Shepherds Bush Gazette deemed the album "an exciting mixture of the traditional slow blues and the wilder, more extroverted rhythm 'n' blues." The Lincoln Journal Star stated that "King can fool you because he plays with such a big beat, but he is a sensitive guitar player when he gets down."

AllMusic wrote that "Burglar is one of those gems that journeymen can put together in their sleep." The Penguin Guide to Blues Recordings noted that King's "guitar solos rarely descend below the eighth fret." The Plain Dealer included the album on its list of the "100 greatest guitar albums from Rock & Roll Hall of Famers", concluding that "King puts it all together as artist, creating a mix of blues and funk with his guitar and voice."

== Track listing ==
No.	Title	Writer(s)	Length
1.	"Pack It Up"	Gonzalez, Chandler	4:09
2.	"My Credit Didn't Go Through"	Gary "Gazza" Johnson, Greg Perry	4:09
3.	"I Got the Same Old Blues"	J.J. Cale	3:23
4.	"Only Getting Second Best"	Don Nix	3:48
5.	"Texas Flyer"	Freddie King, Steve Ferrone	3:45
6.	"Pulp Wood"	Freddie King	3:11
7.	"She's a Burglar"	Jerry Ragovoy	3:51
8.	"Sugar Sweet"	Mel London	2:51
9.	"I Had a Dream"	Freddie King	4:59
10.	"Come On (Let the Good Times Roll)"	Earl King	3:32
Total length:			37:38
