= Believe in Life =

Single by Eric Clapton

from the album Reptile
- Released: 11 June 2001
- Length: 4:02
- Label: Reprise
- Songwriter: Eric Clapton
- Producers: Eric Clapton; Simon Climie

Eric Clapton singles chronology
| "Superman Inside" (2001) | "Believe in Life" (2001) | "If I Had Possession Over Judgement Day" (2004) |

Audio
- "Believe in Life" by Eric Clapton on YouTube

Audio sample
- file; help

"Believe in Life" is a song written and recorded by British rock musician Eric Clapton for his 2001 studio album Reptile. It was written about Clapton's wife Melia McEnery and was released as a promotional single in 2001.

== Background ==
Clapton married American-born graphic artist of Korean-Irish parentage Melia McEnery in January 2001. The couple met in 1998 after McEnery approached the guitar legend for an autograph at a party to promote the artist's 1999 guitar auction in Los Angeles. The event was heldt by Italian fashion designer Giorgio Armani. McEnery worked for Armani at the time. Clapton told Uncut magazine in August 2014 that he believes this heartfelt declaration of love is one of the best tunes that he has ever recorded: "That's my favorite song, and it's also current, because I wrote it about my wife", Clapton said. "I like the fact that it's kind of low-key, a little in-the-background thing, but I'm proud of that song, as much as anything of mine that's more popular or well-known".

== Composition ==
"Believe in Life" consists of an intro, several verses and links, a bridge and a final outro. In total, 24 different chords are used in the tune, including various major- and minor chords as well as seventh chords. The song is basically structured in a simple Clapton-style acoustic track chord progression. The intro chord progression is played four times; it consists of an E^{7}sus^{4} chord, followed by an E major chord, which is repeated again for the first section. The same progression is also used for the link section. The first verse consists of the following chords, played in that order.

F^{#}m^{11} – G^{#}m^{7} – G^{#7}sus^{4} – C^{#}m^{7} – Amaj^{7} – B – G^{#}m^{7} – E/G^{#} – Bm^{7} – E^{7} – Amaj^{7} – F^{#}m^{11} – E^{7}sus^{4}

The bridge consists of F^{#}m, D^{♭}, A^{7}, D, D^{7}, C^{#}m, F^{#7}, Bm^{7} and E^{7} chords. The outro was written by Clapton with A, F^{#7}, Bm^{7}, E^{7}, A and A^{6} chords. For the recording, Clapton is also using the clawhammering picking technique with a nylon string guitar. AllMusic critic William Ruhlmann also notes the distinctive acoustic guitar sound on the track. The recording was produced by Clapton himself with the help of his long-time collaborator record producer Simon Climie.

== Release ==
The recording was released as a promotional single by Reprise Records on compact disc format for various territories including Germany, the United States and Poland. In Japan, "Believe in Life" was released on both compacts disc and twelve inch grammophone record format. The vinyl promotional single release also featured a remix by Clapton's long-time Japanese friend Hiroshi Fujiwara. Although the original album version recording is of five minutes and seven seconds duration, the single edit is one minute and five seconds shorter. However, the original-length version of the track is released as the B-side of the single. "Believe in Life" is also part of the 2008 Welt & Placket compilation release entitled Pilgrim/Reptile. It was also released on the 2015 Warner/Reprise Records compilation album Forever Man.

== Reception ==
The song did not reach a lot of national music charts, peaking at number 11 eleven on the US adult contemporary chart, compiled by the Billboard magazine. It spent seventeen weeks on the chart. Music journalist Simon Warner of PopMatters reviewed the song: "A piece for a larger ensemble – Steve Gadd, Joe Sample, Nathan East and others providing an all star combo – is sadder still, layers of minor changes building a web of bitter-sweet angst, yet it is hard to tune out".

== Charts ==
=== Weekly charts ===
| Chart (2001) | Peak position |
|---|---|
| US Adult Contemporary (Billboard) | 11 |

=== Year-end charts ===
| Chart (2001) | Position |
|---|---|
| US Adult Contemporary (Billboard) | 30 |

== Release history ==
| Region | Date | Format(s) | Ref. |
|---|---|---|---|
| United States | 11 June 2001 | Adult contemporary; hot adult contemporary radio | |
| Japan | 29 August 2001 | CD | |
| Germany | 2001 | CD | |
| United States | 2001 | CD | |
