= Live in Hyde Park (Eric Clapton album) =

Live In Hyde Park
- Directed by: Julia Knowles
- Produced by: Harvey Goldsmith
- Starring: Eric Clapton; Dave Bronze; Steve Gadd; Andy Fairweather Low; Jerry Portnoy; Chris Stainton; Roddy Lorimer; Simon Clarke; Tim Sanders; The Kick Horns; Katie Kissoon; Tessa Niles; & The East London Gospel Choir
- Edited by: Dave Gardener
- Music by: Eric Clapton
- Production company: Allied Television Productions
- Distributed by: Warner Music Vision; Warner Reprise Video
- Release dates: 1997 (VHS); 2001 (DVD)
- Running time: Approx 89 Mins
- Language: English

Live In Hyde Park is a concert film recorded by blues-rock guitarist Eric Clapton on 29 June 1996 in London's Hyde Park. The concert was presented by the MasterCard Masters of Music for The Prince's Trust and featured songs from right across his career. The VHS of the footage from the concert was released in 1997, followed by a DVD version in 2001. Part of Live in Hyde Park was also released as a 4-track promotional CD by Clapton's EC Access fan club in August 2005, featuring Tearin' Us Apart, Five Long Years, I'm Tore Down, and Every Day I Have the Blues.

== Track listing (DVD) ==
1. Layla (Unplugged) (Eric Clapton, Jim Gordon)
2. Badge (Eric Clapton, George Harrison)
3. Hoochie Coochie Man (Willie Dixon)
4. I Shot The Sheriff (Bob Marley)
5. It Hurts Me Too (Elmore James)
6. Wonderful Tonight (Eric Clapton)
7. Five Long Years (Eddie Boyd)
8. Tearing Us Apart (Eric Clapton, Greg Phillinganes)
9. Old Love (Eric Clapton, Robert Cray)
10. I'm Tore Down (Freddie King)
11. Have You Ever Loved A Woman (Billy Myles)
12. White Room (Jack Bruce, Pete Brown)
13. Every Day I Have The Blues (T-Bone Walker)
14. Holy Mother (Eric Clapton, Stephen Bishop)

The VHS release omits "Hoochie Coochie Man" and "It Hurts Me Too".

== Personnel ==
- Eric Clapton – electric guitar · acoustic guitar · vocals
- Dave Bronze – Bass Guitar
- Steve Gadd – Drums
- Andy Fairweather Low – Guitars · vocals
- Jerry Portnoy – Harmonica
- Chris Stainton – Keyboards
- Roddy Lorimer · Simon Clarke · Tim Sanders – The Kick Horns
- Katie Kissoon · Tessa Niles – Backing Vocals
- The East London Gospel Choir

- Julia Knowles – Director
- Harvey Goldsmith – Executive producer
- Michele Hockley – Producer
- David May – Producer
- Edward Simons – Producer
- Ray Still – Executive producer (Warner Music Vision)
- Dave Gardener – Film editing
- Dennis Arnold – Event production manager
- Annie Crofts – Production manager
- Mike Double – Event production manager
- Mnicholike Double – Production manager
- Jonathan Park – Set designer · stage designer
- Simon Climie – 5.1 Surround production
- Mick Guzauski – 5.1 Surround mixer
- Chris Hedges – Sound engineer
- Chris Hey – Sound consultant
- Bob Ludwig – Mastering
- Steve May – Monitor engineer
- Dave Porter – Sound mixer
- Will Shapland – Sound mixer
- David Woolley – Sound mixer
- Nick Brown – Audio stage tech
- Chris Hedges – Live audio engineering
- Steve May – Live audio engineering
- Nick Brown – Live audio engineering
- Tom Kenny – Lighting designer · lighting operator
- Phil Piotrowsky – Camera supervisor
- Naomi Neufeld – Vision mixer
- Clive Brinkworth – Guitar technician
- Lee Dickson – Guitar technician
- Richard Sharman – Drum technician
- Vincent Baker – Keyboard technician
- Chuck Crampton – Site coordinator (Unusual Services)
- Ivan Douglass – Floor manager
- Roger Forrester – Manager
- Alan Jacobi – Site coordinator (Unusual Services)
- Steve Jones – Stage manager
- Brian Lee – DVD authoring · graphics
- Penny Marciano – DVD production coordinator
- Katie McCann – Production coordinator
- Manique Ratner – Assistant to director
- Julie Sykes – Floor manager
- Tony Wheeler – Site coordinator (Unusual Services)
- Raena Winscott – DVD production coordinator
- Gateway Mastering

== Charts ==
| Chart (1997–1998) | Peak position |
|---|---|
| UK Music Video (OCC) | 4 |
| US Music Video (Billboard) | 11 |

| Chart (2002) | Peak position |
|---|---|
| Australian Music DVD (ARIA) | 31 |
| Danish Music DVD (Hitlisten) | 7 |
| Dutch Music DVD (MegaCharts) | 9 |

== Certifications ==
| Region | Certification | Certified units/sales |
|---|---|---|
| Australia (ARIA) | Platinum | 15,000^{^} |
| Denmark (IFPI Danmark) | Gold | 25,000^{^} |
| United Kingdom (BPI) | Gold | 25,000^{*} |
| United States (RIAA) | Platinum | 100,000^{^} |
^{*} Sales figures based on certification alone.^{^} Shipments figures based on certification alone.
