= You've Got to Love Her with a Feeling =

Early blues standard written by Tampa Red

"Love with a Feeling"

Single by Tampa Red
- B-side: "When I Had a Good Woman"
- Released: 1938
- Recorded: Chicago, June 16, 1938
- Genre: Blues
- Length: 2:55
- Label: Bluebird
- Songwriter: Hudson Whittaker a.k.a. Tampa Red

"You've Got to Love Her with a Feeling", or "Love with a Feeling" as it was originally titled, is a blues song first recorded by Tampa Red in 1938. Numerous blues artists have interpreted and recorded the song, making it a blues standard. When Freddie King adapted it in 1961, it became his first single to appear in the record charts.

== Original song ==
Tampa Red recorded "Love with a Feeling" as a mid-tempo twelve-bar blues. Accompanying Red, who sang and played slide guitar, were Black Bob Hudson on piano and an unknown bass player. Although Tampa Red wrote several bawdy blues, "Love with a Feeling" is tame, with only one verse suggesting the more colorful versions to come:

Now the coppers brought her in, she didn't need no bail
She shook it for the judge, and he put the cops in jail
'Cause she shook it with a feeling, yes she shook it with a feeling
Yes she loves with a feeling, or she don't love at all

Not long after recording "Love with a Feeling", other blues artists began recording their versions of the song. In May 1950, Tampa Red recorded an updated version titled "Love Her with a Feelin'". The song was performed as a Chicago-style blues with Tampa Red on electric slide guitar with blues pianist Little Johnny Jones and a bassist and drummer. He also recorded it as a solo piece with vocal and electric guitar in 1961 for his Don't Tampa with the Blues album.

== Freddie King rendition ==
In 1960, Freddie King adapted the song as "You've Got to Love Her with a Feeling". In his arrangement, he uses breaks where he sings the first four bars of each twelve-bar verse without the usual instrumental accompaniment. The recording took place in Cincinnati, Ohio, on August 26, 1960, with King on vocal and guitar, Sonny Thompson on piano, Bill Willis on bass, Phillip Paul on drums, Clifford Scott on tenor saxophone and Gene Redd on trumpet.

The song was released as the B-side of the "Have You Ever Loved a Woman" single on King Records subsidiary, Federal Records. Of the two songs, only "You've Got to Love Her with a Feeling" appeared in the record charts. In 1961, the single reached number 93 on the Billboard Hot 100, but did not appear in the magazine's R&B chart. The song is also included on King's first album, Freddy King Sings (1961). On his single and albums, King is often listed as the songwriter, sometimes with Thompson as co-writer.

== Junior Wells version ==
Chicago blues singer and blues harp player Junior Wells played up the bawdy aspects of the song in several recordings, with blues historian Gerard Herzhaft only commenting "Junior Wells was particularly able to use the advice of Tampa Red." Wells recorded the song as "You've Gotta Love Her with a Feeling" for his Delmark Records album On Tap (1974). In November 1996, a live version was recorded at Buddy Guy's Legends club in Chicago. According to music journalist Frank-John Hadley, Wells "turned in an especially gripping vocal on 'Love Her with a Felling', employing his gnarled enunciations to add an almost unspeakable lustiness to lyrics concerning, well, you know what." The recording is included on Wells' Live at Buddy Guy's Legends, released in 1997 by Telarc Records.
