= Reptile (album) =

Studio album by Eric Clapton
- Released: 5 March 2001
- Studios: The Town House and Olympic Studios (London); Ocean Way Recording (Los Angeles); Right Track Recording (New York City)
- Genres: Rock, blues
- Length: 63:56
- Label: Reprise
- Producer: Eric Clapton · Simon Climie

Eric Clapton chronology
Riding with the King (2000)	Reptile (2001)	One More Car, One More Rider (2002)

Singles from Reptile
- 1. "Superman Inside" Released: 13 February 2001; 2. "I Ain't Gonna Stand for It" Released: 22 March 2001; 3. "Believe in Life" Released: 11 June 2001

Reptile is the fourteenth solo studio album by Eric Clapton. The album was produced by Eric Clapton with Simon Climie and is Clapton's first album to include keyboard work by Billy Preston and background vocals by the Impressions. The album reached the Top 10 in 20 countries, topping the national album charts in three of them. In total, the album sold more than 2.5 million copies and gained several certification awards around the globe. To help promote album sales, music network VH1 streamed the album in full on TV.

Clapton presented the album on his Reptile World Tour in 2001.

== Critical reception ==
Professional ratings
Aggregate scores
Source	Rating
Metacritic	66/100
Review scores
Source	Rating
AllMusic	2.5/5 stars
Entertainment Weekly	C
Rolling Stone	3.5/5 stars

Rolling Stone's Anthony DeCurtis thought Clapton combines both blues and pop music very well and "blends virtually every style he's worked in during the past thirty-five years". PopMatters critic Simon Warner felt the album "could have been mawkish but it's actually quite moving. Clapton, circumspect as a composer and still highly adept as a musical practitioner, has his own authentic blues to draw on now and, in many ways, they hit a truer note than when he dips into the older, existing catalogue of standards. Reptile may be an uneven collection, but its best moments stand close listening". Christa L. Titus from Billboard magazine calls the album a perfect example for Clapton's typical "heritage rock format". William Ruhlmann in his AllMusic review sums up Clapton's history as a rock guitar player and rock god in the early stages of his musical career, then describes the dedication and album artwork of Reptile.

== Track listing ==
Reptile track listing
No.	Title	Writer(s)	Length
1.	"Reptile"	Eric Clapton	3:26
2.	"Got You on My Mind"	Joe Thomas · Howard Briggs	4:30
3.	"Travelin' Light"	J. J. Cale	4:17
4.	"Believe in Life"	Clapton	5:05
5.	"Come Back Baby"	Ray Charles	3:55
6.	"Broken Down"	Simon Climie · Dennis Morgan	5:25
7.	"Find Myself"	Clapton	5:15
8.	"I Ain't Gonna Stand for It"	Stevie Wonder	4:49
9.	"I Want a Little Girl"	Murray Mencher · Billy Moll	2:58
10.	"Second Nature"	Clapton · Climie · Morgan	4:48
11.	"Don't Let Me Be Lonely Tonight"	James Taylor	4:47
12.	"Modern Girl"	Clapton	4:49
13.	"Superman Inside"	Clapton · Doyle Bramhall II · Susannah Melvoin	5:07
14.	"Son & Sylvia"	Clapton	4:43
Total length:			63:56

Japanese Bonus Track
No.	Title	Writer(s)	Length
15.	"Losing Hand"	Jesse Stone	4:18
Total length:			68:14

== Personnel ==
Take from the album's liner notes.

- Eric Clapton – guitar, vocals (2–13, 15)
- Doyle Bramhall II – guitar (2–9, 11–15)
- Andy Fairweather Low – guitar (2–9, 11–15)
- Paul Carrack – keyboards (1), Hammond organ (10), Wurlitzer electric piano (10)
- Billy Preston – Hammond organ (2, 5, 13), acoustic piano (6, 9), harmonica (14)
- Tim Carmon – Hammond organ (3, 4, 7–9, 11), acoustic piano (5, 13), synthesizer (12, 14), organ (15)
- Joe Sample – Wurlitzer electric piano (3, 6), Fender Rhodes (4), electric piano (8, 11, 14), acoustic piano (11, 14, 15)
- Pino Palladino – bass guitar (1, 10)
- Nathan East – bass guitar (2–9, 11–15)
- Steve Gadd – drums
- Paul Waller – drum programming (1, 3, 4, 6, 8, 10, 11, 13)
- Paulinho da Costa – percussion (1, 3–9, 11, 13, 15)
- Nick Ingman – string arrangements (6, 11, 12, 14)
- The Impressions – backing vocals (2–5, 7–13)

=== Production ===
- Eric Clapton – producer, album sleeve concept, liner notes
- Simon Climie – producer, Pro Tools engineer
- Alan Douglas – engineer
- Adam Brown – additional engineer, additional Pro Tools engineer
- Pete Karam – additional engineer
- Paul Walton – additional Pro Tools engineer
- Tom Sweeney – assistant engineer
- Matt Fields – assistant engineer
- Mick Guzauski – mixing
- Bob Ludwig – mastering at Gateway Mastering (Portland, Maine).
- Lee Dickson – guitar technician
- Paul Miggens – lettering
- Catherine Roylance – design
- Jack English – photography
- Bushbranch – management

== Commercial success ==
=== America, Asia and Oceania ===
In the United States, Reptile peaked at number five on the Billboard 200 top albums chart, gaining a so-called "Hot Shot Debut" recognition by the American magazine, as the album sold a total of 101,500 units in its first week. In addition to its success on the main albums chart, compiled by Billboard, the 2001 release also topped the magazines top Internet albums chart for several weeks. In the first quarter of 2001, Reptile sold more than 215,000 copies in the United States alone. On 8 June, the rock album was certified with a Gold disc by the Recording Industry Association of America (RIAA) to commemorate outstanding sales figures reaching more than 500,000 copies. In total, the album stayed sixteen weeks on the Billboard 200 chart and sold more than 700,000 copies by the end of 2001 in the United States, making it that years 184th most purchased album. In Canada, Clapton's 2001 release went to number 11 on Billboards top Canadian albums chart in 2001. In Japan, the release was even more successful, reaching position six on Oricons album chart in 2001. In New Zealand, Reptile peaked at number 15. However, in Australia, the Clapton album reached number 20 on the ARIA charts in 2001, and was certified Platinum for sales exceeding 70,000 copies in the country.

=== Europe ===
Reptile was a big success in Europe, topping three album charts in the continent, reaching the Top 10 in 16 countries and gaining a total of 13 certification awards for outstanding record sales. In Austria, the album peaked at number two on the albums chart in 2001. In Belgium, the release peaked at number ten in Flanders and number 13 in Wallonia. In the Czech Republic, the release topped the nations album chart. In Denmark, the album reached position seven on the Hitlisten chart in 2001. In the Netherlands, Reptile reached number nine on the MegaCharts album compilation. Reptile also reached number five on Finland's Suomen virallinen lista albums chart. In France, the album peaked at number nine on the album charts, compiled by the Syndicat National de l'Édition Phonographique (SNEP) in 2001. In Germany, the album peaked at number two on the albums chart, and was certified, Gold by the Bundesverband Musikindustrie (BVMI), selling more than 150,000 copies in the country. In Greece, Hungary and Ireland, the album reached positions one, 13 and 25 in 2001. Reptile was a hit album in Italy, as it peaked at number eight in the country. In Norway, Reptile reached number seven on the VG-lista chart. In Poland, the Clapton album reached number four on the country's albums chart in 2001. In Portugal, Reptile reached number five on the nations album chart in 2001. In Spain, the album reached number five on the albums chart, and was certified Gold by the Productores de Música de España (PROMUSICAE) for outstanding sales figures, reaching 50,000 sold copies. In Sweden, the album reached number nine on the Sverigetopplistan albums chart in 2001. Reptile was also certified Gold in Switzerland by the local IFPI office, previously peaking at number two on the Schweizer Hitparade. In the United Kingdom, the album peaked at number seven on the charts compiled by the Official Charts Company, where it stayed for nine weeks on chart. It was certified Gold by the British Phonographic Industry (BPI). In Scotland, the album peaked at number 22. Overall, the album reached number two on the European albums chart in 2001.

== Chart positions ==
=== Weekly charts ===
Chart (2001)	Peak position
Australian Albums (ARIA)	20
Austrian Albums (Ö3 Austria)	2
Belgian Albums (Ultratop Flanders)	10
Belgian Albums (Ultratop Wallonia)	13
Canadian Albums (Billboard)	11
Czech Albums (IFPI CR)	8
Danish Albums (Hitlisten)	7
Dutch Albums (Album Top 100)	9
European Albums (IFPI)	2
Finnish Albums (Suomen virallinen lista)	5
French Albums (SNEP)	9
German Albums (Offizielle Top 100)	2
Greek Albums (IFPI)	1
Hungarian Albums (MAHASZ)	13
Irish Albums (IRMA)	25
Italian Albums (FIMI)	8
Japanese Albums (Oricon)	6
New Zealand Albums (RMNZ)	15
Norwegian Albums (VG-lista)	7
Polish Albums (ZPAV)	4
Portuguese Albums (AFP)	5
Scottish Albums (Official Charts)	22
Spanish Albums (AFYVE)	5
Swedish Albums (Sverigetopplistan)	9
Swiss Albums (Schweizer Hitparade)	2
UK Albums (Official Charts)	7
US Billboard 200	5
US Top Internet Albums (Billboard)	1

=== Year-end charts ===
Chart (2001)	Position
Austrian Albums (Ö3 Austria)	60
European Albums (IFPI)	52
German Albums (Offizielle Top 100)	38
Swiss Albums (Schweizer Hitparade)	59
US Billboard 200	184

== Certifications ==
Region	Certification	Certified units/sales
Argentina (CAPIF)	Gold	20,000^{^}
Australia (ARIA)	Platinum	70,000^{^}
Brazil (Pro-Música Brasil)	Gold	50,000^{*}
Canada (Music Canada)	Gold	50,000^{^}
Germany (BVMI)	Gold	150,000^{^}
Japan (RIAJ)	Platinum	200,000^{^}
Norway (IFPI Norway)	Gold	25,000^{*}
Spain (Promusicae)	Gold	50,000^{^}
Switzerland (IFPI Switzerland)	Gold	20,000^{^}
United Kingdom (BPI)	Gold	100,000^{^}
United States (RIAA)	Gold	700,000
^{*} Sales figures based on certification alone.^{^} Shipments figures based on certification alone.
