= The Crunge =

- German single picture sleeve

Single by Led Zeppelin

from the album Houses of the Holy
- A-side: "D'yer Mak'er"
- Released: 17 September 1973 (US)
- Recorded: 1972
- Studio: Headley Grange, Headley, England
- Genre: Funk rock
- Length: 3:10
- Label: Atlantic
- Songwriters: John Bonham; John Paul Jones; Jimmy Page; Robert Plant
- Producer: Jimmy Page

Led Zeppelin singles chronology
"Over the Hills and Far Away" (1973)	"The Crunge" (1973)	"Trampled Under Foot" (1975)

"The Crunge" is a song by the English rock band Led Zeppelin from their 1973 album Houses of the Holy. The song is a takeoff on James Brown's style of funk similar to the group's attempt at reggae with "D'yer Mak'er". It was also released as the B-side of "D'yer Mak'er" in the US.

== Composition and recording ==
The song evolved out of a jam session in the studio. John Bonham started the beat, John Paul Jones came in on bass, Jimmy Page played a funk guitar riff (and a chord sequence that he had been experimenting with since 1970), and Robert Plant started singing. For the recording, Page played a Fender Stratocaster guitar and it is possible to hear him depressing a whammy bar at the end of each phrase.

The song is primarily in 9/8, giving its distinctive, off-kilter rhythm. It has a relatively unique structure, comprising verses and a chorus but lacks a bridge or middle eight, common in most forms of Western popular music. Because of this, Plant asks where the bridge is by imploring in the final bars (and answers himself), culminating with "Have you seen the bridge?" "I ain't seen the bridge!" "Where's that confounded bridge?"

== Personnel ==
Personnel taken from album sleeve

- Robert Plant – vocals
- Jimmy Page – guitars
- John Paul Jones – bass guitar, synthesiser
- John Bonham – drums

== Reception ==
In a contemporary review for Houses of the Holy, Gordon Fletcher of Rolling Stone gave "The Crunge" a negative review, calling it a "naked imitation", along with "D'yer Mak'er", as well as "easily" one of the worst things the band has ever attempted.

Fletcher added, "[It] reproduces James Brown so faithfully that it's every bit as boring, repetitive and clichéd as 'Good Foot'. Yakety-yak guitar, boom-boom bass, astoundingly idiotic lyrics ('when she walks, she walks, and when she talks, she talks') — it's all there. So is Jones' synthesizer, spinning absolutely superfluous electronic fills."

== See also ==
- List of cover versions of Led Zeppelin songs – "The Crunge" entries
