= Freddie King =

American blues guitarist and singer (1934–1976)

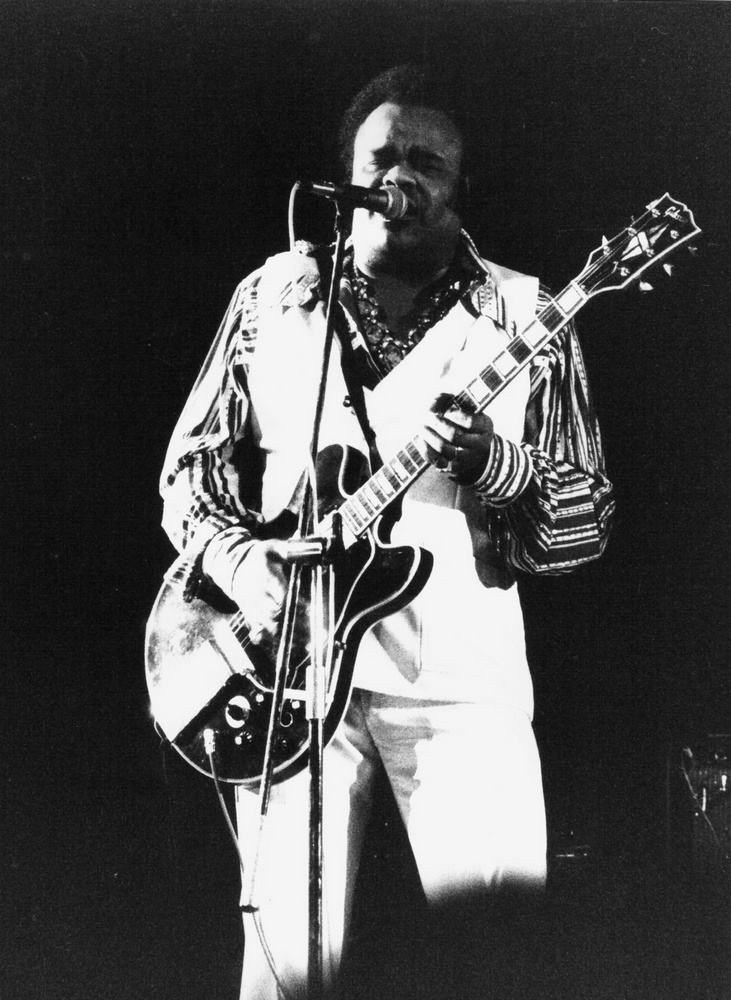
- King in 1975

Background information
- Also known as: Freddy King
- Born: Fred King; September 3, 1934; Gilmer, Texas, U.S.
- Died: December 28, 1976 (aged 42) Dallas, Texas, U.S.
- Genres: Blues
- Occupations: Musician; songwriter
- Instruments: Guitar; vocals
- Years active: 1952–1976
- Labels: El-Bee; King; Federal; Atlantic; Shelter; RSO
- Spouse: Jessie Burnett (m. 1952)
- Website: www.freddieking.net

Freddie King (born Fred King September 3, 1934 – December 28, 1976), also billed as Freddy King, was an American blues guitarist, singer and songwriter. Along with the unrelated Albert King and B. B. King, he is considered one of the "Three Kings of the Blues Guitar". Known for his soulful and powerful voice and distinctive guitar playing, King had a major influence on electric blues music and on many later blues guitarists.

Born in Gilmer, Texas, King became acquainted with the guitar at the age of six. He started learning the guitar from his mother and his uncle. King moved to Chicago when he was a teenager; there he formed his first band the Every Hour Blues Boys with guitarist Jimmie Lee Robinson and drummer Frank "Sonny" Scott. As he was repeatedly being rejected by Chess Records, he got signed to Federal Records, and got his break with the single "Have You Ever Loved a Woman" and instrumental "Hide Away", which reached number five on the Billboard magazine's rhythm and blues chart in 1961. It later became a blues standard. King derived his guitar style from Texas blues and Chicago blues influences. The album Freddy King Sings showcases his singing talents and includes the record chart hits "You've Got to Love Her with a Feeling" and "I'm Tore Down". He later became involved with producers who were more oriented to rhythm and blues and rock and was one of the first bluesmen to have a multiracial backing band at performances.

He was inducted into the Rock and Roll Hall of Fame by ZZ Top in 2012 and into the Blues Hall of Fame in 1982. His instrumental "Hide Away" was included in the Rock and Roll Hall of Fame's list of "500 Songs that Shaped Rock". He was ranked 19th in the Rolling Stone magazine's 2023 edition of 250 Greatest Guitarists of All Time.

== Biography ==
=== 1934–1952: Early life ===
Fred King was born in Gilmer, Texas, in 1934 to Ella Mae King and J. T. Christian. When Freddie was 6 years old, his mother and his uncle taught him to play the guitar. In 1949, he and his family moved from Dallas to the South Side of Chicago.

In 1952, King started working in a steel mill. In the same year he married another Texas native, Jessie Burnett. They had seven children together.

=== 1952–1959: Move to Chicago and early works ===
Almost as soon as he had moved to Chicago, King started sneaking into South Side nightclubs, where he heard blues performed by Muddy Waters, Howlin' Wolf, T-Bone Walker, Elmore James, and Sonny Boy Williamson. King formed his first band, the Every Hour Blues Boys, with the guitarist Jimmie Lee Robinson and the drummer Frank "Sonny" Scott. In 1952, while employed at a steel mill, the eighteen-year-old King occasionally worked as a sideman with such bands as the Little Sonny Cooper Band and Earl Payton's Blues Cats. In 1953 he recorded with the latter for Parrot Records, but these recordings were never released. As the 1950s progressed, King played with several of Muddy Waters's sidemen and other Chicago mainstays, including the guitarists Jimmy Rogers, Robert Lockwood Jr., Eddie Taylor, and Hound Dog Taylor; the bassist Willie Dixon; the pianist Memphis Slim; and the harmonicist Little Walter.

In 1956 he cut his first record as a leader, for El-Bee Records. The A-side was "Country Boy", a duet with Margaret Whitfield. The B-side was a King vocal. Both tracks feature the guitar of Robert Lockwood Jr., who during these years was also adding rhythm backing and fills to Little Walter's records.

King was repeatedly rejected in auditions for the South Side's Chess Records, the premier blues label, which was the home of Muddy Waters, Howlin' Wolf, and Little Walter. The complaint was that King sang too much like B.B. King. A newer blues scene, lively with nightclubs and upstart record companies, was burgeoning on the West Side, though. The bassist and producer Willie Dixon, during a period of estrangement from Chess in the late 1950s, asked King to come to Cobra Records for a session, but the results have never been heard. Meanwhile, King established himself as perhaps the biggest musical force on the West Side. He played along with Magic Sam and reputedly played backing guitar, uncredited, on some of Sam's tracks for Mel London's Chief and Age labels, though King does not stand out on them.

=== 1959–1966: Federal Records ===
In 1959 King got to know Sonny Thompson, a pianist, producer, and A&R man for Cincinnati's King Records. King Records' owner, Syd Nathan, signed King to the subsidiary Federal Records in 1960. King recorded his debut single for the label on August 26, 1960: "Have You Ever Loved a Woman" backed with "You've Got to Love Her with a Feeling" (again credited as Freddy King). From the same recording session at the King Studios in Cincinnati, Ohio, King cut the instrumental "Hide Away", which the next year reached number five on the R&B chart and number 29 on the Pop chart, an unprecedented accomplishment for a blues instrumental at a time when the genre was still largely unknown to white audiences. It was originally released as the B-side of "I Love the Woman". "Hide Away" was King's melange of a theme by Hound Dog Taylor and parts by others, such as "The Walk", by Jimmy McCracklin, and "Peter Gunn", as credited by King. The title of the tune refers to Mel's Hide Away Lounge, a popular blues club on the West Side of Chicago. Willie Dixon later claimed that he had recorded King performing "Hide Away" for Cobra Records in the late 1950s, but such a version has never surfaced. "Hide Away" became a blues standard.

After their success with "Hide Away", King and Thompson recorded thirty more instrumentals, including "San-Ho-Zay", "Sen-Sa-Shun", "Heads Up", "The Stumble", "Side Tracked", "Just Pickin'", "In The Open", "Driving Sideways", "High Rise", "Onion Rings", "Remington Ride", and "The Sad Nite Owl". They recorded vocal tracks throughout this period but often released the tunes as instrumentals on albums.

During the Federal period, King toured with many notable R&B artists of the day, including Sam Cooke, Jackie Wilson, and James Brown.

=== 1966–1974: Cotillion, Shelter, RSO Records ===
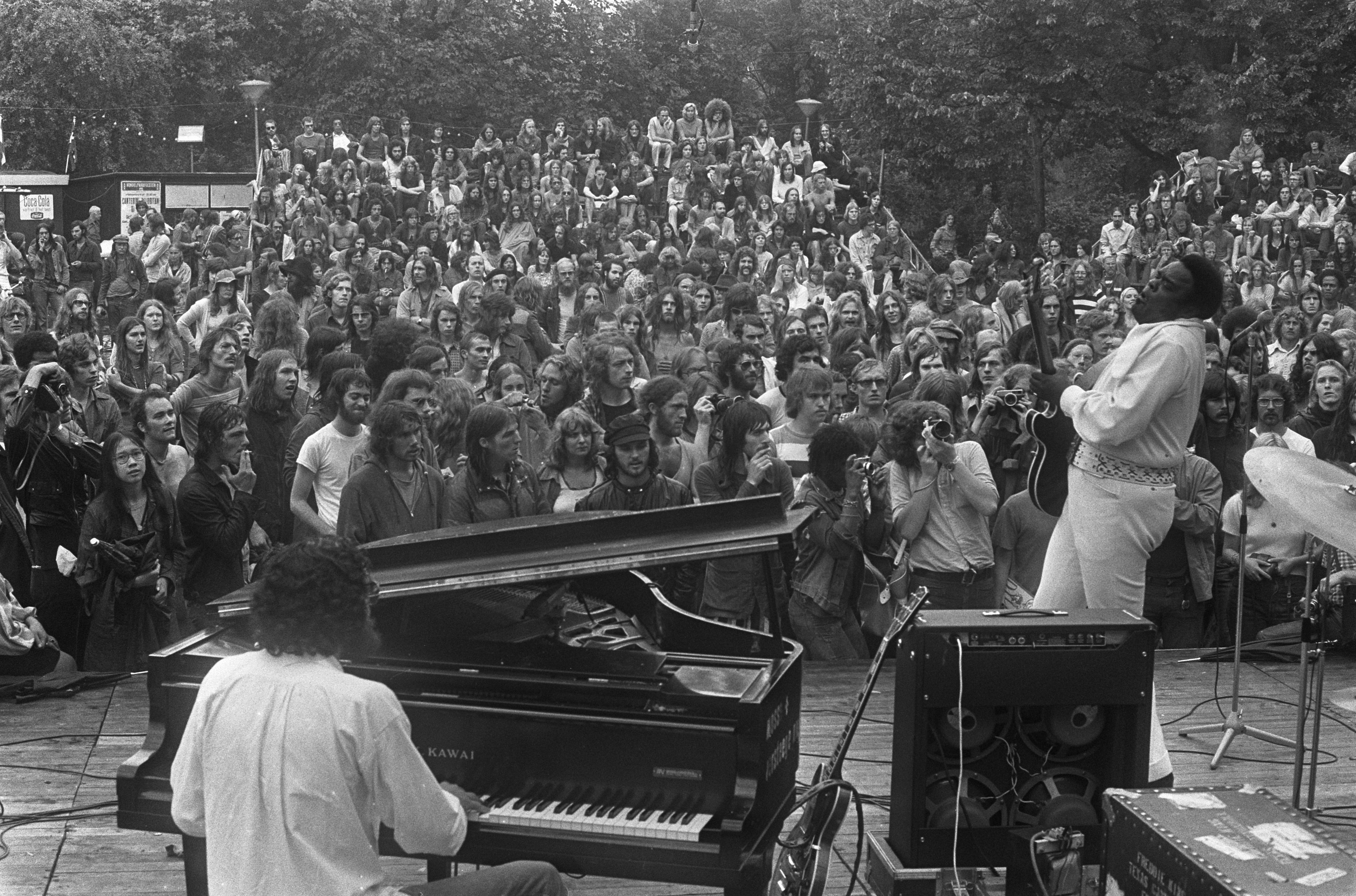
King in Amsterdam, 1973

King's contract with Federal expired in 1966, by which time he had moved back to Dallas from Chicago, and his first overseas tour followed in 1967. His availability was noticed by the producer and saxophonist King Curtis, who had recorded a cover of "Hide Away", with Cornell Dupree on guitar, in 1962. Curtis signed King to Atlantic in 1968, which resulted in two LPs, Freddie King Is a Blues Master (1969) and My Feeling for the Blues (1970), produced by Curtis for the Atlantic subsidiary Cotillion Records.

In 1969 King hired Jack Calmes as his manager, who secured him an appearance at the 1969 Texas Pop Festival, alongside Led Zeppelin and others, and this led to King's signing a recording contract with Shelter Records, a new label established by the rock pianist Leon Russell and the record producer Denny Cordell and recorded at their studio, The Church Studio in Tulsa, Oklahoma. The company treated King as an important artist, flying him to Chicago to the former Chess studios to record the album Getting Ready... and providing a lineup of top session musicians, including Russell. Three albums were made during this period, including blues classics and new songs, such as "Going Down", written by Don Nix.

King performed alongside the big rock acts of the day, such as Eric Clapton and Grand Funk Railroad (whose song "We're an American Band" mentions King in its lyrics), and for a young, mainly white audience, along with the white tour drummer Gary Carnes, for three years, before signing with RSO Records. In 1974 he recorded Burglar, for which Tom Dowd produced the track "Sugar Sweet" at Criteria Studios in Miami, with guitarists Clapton and George Terry, drummer Jamie Oldaker and bassist Carl Radle. Mike Vernon produced the other tracks. Vernon also produced a second album for King, Larger than Life, for the same label. Vernon brought in other notable musicians for both albums, such as Bobby Tench of the Jeff Beck Group, to complement King.

=== Death ===
Nearly constant touring took its toll on King—he was on the road almost 300 days out of the year. In 1976 he began suffering from stomach ulcers. His health quickly deteriorated, and he died on December 28 of complications from this illness and acute pancreatitis, at the age of 42.

According to those who knew him, King's untimely death was due to stress, a legendary "hard-partying lifestyle", and a poor diet of consuming Bloody Marys because as he told a journalist, "they've got food in them." King is buried at Hillcrest Memorial Park in Dallas, Texas.

== Musical style ==
King had an intuitive style, often creating guitar parts with vocal nuances. He achieved this by using the open-string sound associated with Texas blues and the raw, screaming tones of West Side, Chicago blues. King's combination of the Texas and Chicago sounds gave his music a more contemporary feel than that of many Chicago bands who were still performing 1950s-style music, and he befriended the younger generation of blues musicians. In his early career he played a solid-body gold-top Gibson Les Paul with P-90 pickups. He later played several slimline semi-hollow body Gibson electric guitars, including an ES-335, ES-345, and ES-355. He used a plastic thumb pick and a metal index-finger pick.

== Legacy ==
By proclamation of the governor of Texas, Ann Richards, September 3, 1993, was declared Freddie King Day, an honor reserved for Texas legends, such as Bob Wills and Buddy Holly. He was inducted into the Rock and Roll Hall of Fame in 2012, and placed 15th in Rolling Stone magazine's list of the 100 greatest guitarists of all time.

Several of King's early 1960s instrumentals found their way into the repertoire of surf music bands: "Those instrumental hits Freddy King had – 'Hide Away', 'San-Ho-Zay', 'The Stumble' – [t]he way white kids were relating to it was like surf guitar in a way; instrumental music that you could dance to." One band that mixed R&B and surf instrumentals occasionally included Jerry Garcia. He later explained: "When I started playing electric guitar the second time, with the Warlocks, it was a Freddie King album that I got almost all my ideas off of, his phrasing really. That first one, Here's Freddie King, later it came out as Freddie King Plays Surfin' Music or something like that, it has 'San-Ho-Zay' on it and 'Sen-Sa-Shun' and all those instrumentals" (Editor's note: King's 1961 instrumental album, Let's Hide Away and Dance Away with Freddy King, was retitled Freddy King Goes Surfin' for a 1963 re-release).

According to music critic Cub Koda, King has influenced guitarists such as Eric Clapton, Mick Taylor, Lonnie Mack, and Stevie Ray Vaughan. In Michael Corcoran's words, King "merged the most vibrant characteristics of both [Chicago and Texas] regional styles and became the biggest guitar hero of the mid-sixties British blues revivalists, who included Eric Clapton, Savoy Brown, Chicken Shack, and Peter Green-era Fleetwood Mac". Clapton said in 1985 that King's 1961 song "I Love the Woman" was "the first time I heard that electric lead-guitar style, with the bent notes ... [it] started me on my path." In a later interview with Dan Forte in Guitar World, he said of King's guitar playing on his rendition of "I Love The Woman": "That just sent me into a complete kind of ecstasy, and it scared the shit out of me. I'd never heard anything like it, and I thought I'd never get anywhere near it. And I know now that I never will, but it was what immediately made me want to carry on." As Rolling Stone later wrote, "Clapton shared his love of King with fellow British guitar heroes Jeff Beck, Peter Green, and Mick Taylor, all of whom were profoundly influenced by King's sharpened-treble tone and curt melodic hooks on iconic singles such as 'The Stumble', 'I'm Tore Down' and 'Someday, After Awhile'."

King was among many pioneering African-American blues musicians to embrace the British blues scene and tour its club circuit in the late 1960s. Robert Christgau credited King's embrace of Britain with creating his renown as a pioneer of electric blues guitar. In Gary Graff's MusicHound Rock (1996), the entry on King states: "Although his reputation rests with his guitar, King also sang with an underrated, powerful style. His lasting influence has insured Freddie King's recognition as one of the great postwar blues masters."

=== Appraisal of recording work ===
Recommending what albums of King's music to hear, MusicHound Rock cited the 1993 Rhino compilation The Best of Freddie King, for focusing on "the fruitful abundance" of his recordings for King Records (1961–66), and the 1995 Black Top CD Live at the Electric Ballroom 1974, for its "blasting, ripping concert" recording along with "a rare pair of acoustic" performances; Freddie King Is a Blues Master (1969) and My Feeling for the Blues (1970) were named records to avoid, as they "both suffer from thin accompaniment, too little guitar and reedy vocals". John Swenson, writing in The Rolling Stone Jazz & Blues Guide (1999), also recommended the Electric Ballroom recording, along with "Home Cooking's Live at the Texas Opry House (documenting a 1976 show in Houston)", saying they are "the best antidotes to King's lackluster studio work from these years".

In his only review of a King album, The Best of Freddie King (1975) by Shelter Records, Christgau wrote in Christgau's Record Guide: Rock Albums of the Seventies (1981) that the 1971–73 recordings are "a bunch of Leon Russell and Don Nix boogies, [King's] voice blurred, his guitar all fake and roll." He added that, while the guitarist had recorded some "acute R&B" singles early in his career, he later "coast[ed] for years". However, in a review of King's 1974 album Burglar for AllMusic, Joe Viglione called it "entertaining and concise" and believed the album "stands as a solid representation of an important musician which is as enjoyable as it is historic".

== Discography ==
=== Studio albums ===
List of studio albums with year, title, record label, and chart peak
Year	Title	Label (Cat. No.)	Peak chart position	
Year	Title	Label (Cat. No.)	R&B	US
1961	Freddy King Sings (reissued on Modern Blues MBLP-722 in 1987)	King (762)		
1961	Let's Hide Away and Dance Away with Freddy King	King (773)		
1962	Boy – Girl – Boy Freddy King / Lula Reed / Sonny Thompson (shared album)	King (777)		
1963	Bossa Nova and Blues	King (821)		
1963	Freddy King Goes Surfin' (reissue of King 773)	King (856)		
1965	Gives You a Bonanza of Instrumentals	King (928)		
1969	Freddie King Is a Blues Master	Cotillion (SD 9004)		
1970	My Feeling for the Blues	Cotillion (SD 9016)		
1971	Getting Ready...	Shelter (SW8905)		
1972	Texas Cannonball	Shelter (SW8913)		
1973	Woman Across the River	Shelter (SW8921)	54	158
1974	Burglar	RSO (SO4803)	53	
1975	Larger Than Life	RSO (SO4811)		

=== Selected compilation albums ===
List of selected compilation albums with year, title, label, and chart peak
Year	Title	Label (Cat. No.)	Peak chart position	
Year	Title	Label (Cat. No.)	R&B	US
1966	Vocals and Instrumentals (24 Great Songs)	King (964)		
1975	The Best of Freddie King	Shelter (SR-2140)		
1977	Freddie King 1934–1976	RSO (RS-1-3025)		
1977	All His Hits	Gusto (5012X)		
1985	Takin' Care of Business	Charly R&B (CRB-1099)		
1986	Just Pickin' (reissues King 773 and 928)	Modern Blues (MB2LP-721)		
1992	Blues Guitar Hero: The Influential Early Sessions	Ace (CDCHD 454)		
1993	Hide Away: The Best of Freddy King	Rhino (R2 71510)		
1995	King of the Blues [2-CD set]	EMI (72438 34972 25)		
1995	Texas Sensation	Charly R&B (CD-CHARLY-247)		
2000	The Best of Freddie King: The Shelter Records Years	The Right Stuff (72435-27245-29)		
2001	Ultimate Collection	Hip-O (314 520 909-2)		
2002	Blues Guitar Hero, Volume 2	Ace (CDCHD 861)		
2002	The Very Best of Freddy King [three volumes]	Collectables (COL 2824/2825/2826)		
2009	Taking Care of Business 1956–1973 [7-CD box set]	Bear Family (BCD 16979 GK)		
2010	Texas Flyer 1974–1976 [5-CD box set]	Bear Family (BCD 16778 EK)		
2015	Heads Up! The First Fourteen Singles A's & B's 1960–1962	Jasmine (JASMCD 3050)		
2016	Texas Oil: The Complete Federal & El-Bee Sides 1956–1962 [2-CD set]	Hoodoo Records (263540); reissued in 2022 on Soul Jam Records (600925)		
2020	Blues Journey [3-CD set]	Sunset Blvd Records (SBR-7959)		
2026	Feeling Alright: The Complete 1975 Nancy Pulsations Concert [3-LP set/2-CD set]	Elemental Music Records (5990557)		

=== Charting singles ===
List of singles with year, title, label, and chart peak
Year	Title	Label (Cat. No.)	Peak chart position	
Year	Title	Label (Cat. No.)	R&B	US
1956	"Country Boy" / "That's What You Think"	El-Bee (157)		
1960	"Have You Ever Loved a Woman"	Federal (12384)		
1960	/ "You've Got to Love Her with a Feeling"	Federal (12384)		92
1961	"Hide Away" (i) / "I Love the Woman"	Federal (12401)	5	29
1961	"Lonesome Whistle Blues" / "It's Too Bad (Things Are Going So Tough)"	Federal (12415)	8	88
1961	"San-Ho-Zay" (i)	Federal (12428)	4	47
1961	/ "See See Baby"	Federal (12428)	21	
1961	"I'm Tore Down" / "Sen-Sa-Shun" (i)	Federal (12432)	5	
1961	"Christmas Tears" / "I Hear Jingle Bells"	Federal (12439)	28	

== Bibliography ==
- Busby, Mark (2004). The Southwest. Greenwood Publishing Group. ISBN 978-0-313-32805-3.
- Clapton, Eric (2007). Clapton: The Autobiography. Broadway Books. Digitized September 4, 2008. ISBN 978-0-385-51851-2.
- Corcoran, Michael (2005). All Over the Map: True Heroes of Texas Music. University of Texas Press. ISBN 978-0-292-70976-8.
- Forte, Dan (2000). "Freddie King". In Rollin' and Tumblin': The Postwar Blues Guitarists. Jas Obrecht, ed. San Francisco: Miller Freeman Books. pp. 275–280. ISBN 0-87930-613-0, 978-0-87930-613-7.
- Hardy, Phil; Laing, Dave; Stephen, Barnard; Perretta, Don (1988). Encyclopedia of Rock. 2nd ed., rev. Schirmer Books. Digitized December 21, 2006. ISBN 978-0-02-919562-8.
- Koster, Rick (2000). Texas Music. St. Martin's Press. ISBN 978-0-312-25425-4.
- Lawrence, Robb (2008). The Early Years of the Les Paul Legacy 1915–1963. Hal Leonard. ISBN 978-0-634-04861-6.
- O'Neal, Jim; Van Singel, Amy (2002). The Voice of the Blues: Classic Interviews from Living Blues Magazine. 10th ed. Routledge. ISBN 978-0-415-93653-8.
- Pruter, Robert (1992). Chicago Soul. 5th ed., reprint. University of Illinois Press. ISBN 978-0-252-06259-9.
- Whitburn, Joel (1988). Joel Whitburn's Top R&B Singles 1942-1988. Record Research, Incorporated. ISBN 0898200695.
