= Hide Away (instrumental) =

Instrumental blues standard first recorded by Freddie King

Single by Freddie King
- B-side: "I Love the Woman" (initially A-side)
- Released: 1960–1961
- Recorded: August 26, 1960
- Studio: King, Cincinnati, Ohio
- Genre: Blues
- Length: 2:36
- Label: Federal
- Songwriter(s): Freddie King, Sonny Thompson
- Producer(s): Sonny Thompson

Freddie King singles chronology
"You've Got to Love Her with a Feeling" (1960)	"Hide Away" (1960)	"Lonesome Whistle Blues" (1961)

"Hide Away" or "Hideaway" is a blues guitar instrumental that has become "a standard for countless blues and rock musicians performing today". First recorded in 1960 by Freddie King, the song became a hit on the record charts. It has been interpreted and recorded by numerous blues and other musicians and has been recognized by the Rock and Roll Hall of Fame and the Grammy Hall of Fame.

== Origins ==
"Hide Away" is credited to Freddie King and Sonny Thompson (pianist and A&R man at Federal Records). However, in an interview, Freddie King stated that "Hide Away" came from a Hound Dog Taylor song called "Taylor's Boogie". Shakey Jake Harris, a harmonica player who played with Magic Sam, recalled:

At that time me and Sam was playing at Mel's Hideaway [Mel's Hide Away Lounge, a Chicago blues club where many of the blues musicians of the era played]. That's where Freddie King's 'Hide Away' comes from. We stole it from Hound Dog Taylor, and Freddie King stole it from us. It used to be our theme song. It was Magic Sam's theme song. And so Freddie King would come in and jam with us until he learnt that song.

Magic Sam recorded a variation of the song, "Do the Camel Walk", in 1961.

In his autobiography, Willie Dixon suggests that he named the song "Hideaway". He went on to say that "the guy who really wrote 'Hideaway' was this guy called Irving Spencer, the one I used to play with back on Madison Street, that was on Koko Taylor's first recording. He was playing that 'Hideaway' for years before anybody paid any attention to it". Dixon also claimed that Freddie King had recorded "Hideaway" earlier for Cobra Records, but none of his Cobra material was ever issued.

== Freddie King rendition ==
Freddie King acknowledged that "Hide Away" has elements of several songs, but arranged in his own way. Starting with Hound Dog Taylor's song, he said he then "got a idea about these breaks and things in there". He credited Robert Jr. Lockwood with inspiring "the diminished chord I used on the break part" "and the thing I put in there like 'The Walk'. That came from one of Jimmy McCracklin's songs, you know, I just pitched it all in like this. Made a commercial thing out of it. But – it sold". Freddie King also added a section of "The Peter Gunn Theme" from a popular television series of the time. Bill Willis, who played bass at the recording session, recalled the cue King used for that section "He [King] would be playing—like when we did the 'Peter Gunn' thing in 'Hide Away'—and just before he started it, he would take his hand and point it like a pistol at us. 'Okay, we're going into "Peter Gunn"'". The following section features a guitar figure similar to one in "Guitar Boogie Shuffle", a 1959 guitar instrumental hit.

"Hide Away" was recorded in 1960 and backing King on guitar were Sonny Thompson on piano, Bill Willis on bass, and Philip Paul on drums. The following year it spent nineteen weeks on the Billboard Hot R&B chart where it reached number five. The song also reached number 29 on the Hot 100, making it one of the highest showings in the broader singles chart by a blues artist. Freddie King recorded an updated version for his 1969 album Freddie King Is a Blues Master.

== John Mayall/Eric Clapton version ==
In 1963, Eric Clapton was introduced to "Hide Away" (and the single's B-side "I Love the Woman") by bandmate Tom McGuinness of the Roosters. Later in 1966, he recorded "Hideaway" for the John Mayall Blues Breakers with Eric Clapton album. The version followed the original, but with a jazzier rhythm-section arrangement and more vamping by Clapton, including an Elmore James-style riff. The "Peter Gunn Theme" section was dropped in favor of a loose take on "Baby Elephant Walk". The album was popular in England, where it reached number six in the UK Albums Chart. Clapton called it "the breakthrough album that really brought my playing to people's attention" and where he developed his signature overdriven Les Paul guitar sound.

== Stevie Ray Vaughan & Double Trouble versions ==
During his early career with Double Trouble, Stevie Ray Vaughan often performed "Hide Away" live. A version, with Vaughan's instrumental composition "Rude Mood", was performed at the Montreux Jazz Festival in July 1982 and is included on his Live at Montreux 1982 & 1985 album. A studio version by Vaughan is included on the 1999 remaster of his 1984 album Couldn't Stand the Weather. During "Stevie Speaks" (an interview with Vaughan from the album), he uses the song to talk about how ordinary things from everyday life used to inspire musicians.

== Recognition ==
In 1995, Rock and Roll Hall of Fame identified "Hide Away" as one of the "500 Songs That Shaped Rock and Roll". The song received a Grammy Hall of Fame Award in 1999 and in 2007 was inducted into the Blues Foundation Hall of Fame. In a song review for AllMusic, Bill Dahl commented: "No respectable blues band would dare mount a stage without having 'Hide Away' in their arsenal as their principal instrumental break song. So rousingly recognizable is its galloping shuffle groove and stinging melody that it has reigned as the blues set-closer for several decades." He added that the instrumental's appeal went beyond blues and was often performed by surf bands.
