= One More Cup of Coffee (Valley Below) =

1976 song by Bob Dylan

- Cover of the Japanese single release

Song by Bob Dylan

from the album Desire
- Released: January 1976
- Recorded: July 30, 1975
- Studio: Studio E, Columbia Recording Studios (New York)
- Length: 3:47
- Label: Columbia
- Songwriter: Bob Dylan
- Producer: Don DeVito

Desire track listing
- 9 tracks Side one: 1. "Hurricane"; 2. "Isis"; 3. "Mozambique"; 4. "One More Cup of Coffee (Valley Below)"; 5. "Oh, Sister"; Side two: 6. "Joey"; 7. "Romance in Durango"; 8. "Black Diamond Bay"; 9. "Sara"

"One More Cup of Coffee (Valley Below)" is a song by American singer-songwriter Bob Dylan, which was released as the fourth track on his seventeenth studio album Desire (1976). The song was written by Dylan, and produced by Don DeVito. The album version of "One More Cup of Coffee (Valley Below)" was recorded on July 30, 1975, and released on Desire in January 1976. Dylan said the song was influenced by his visit to a Romani celebration at Saintes-Maries-de-la-Mer in France on his 34th birthday.

Emmylou Harris sings with Dylan on the track; their performance received critical acclaim. Dylan performed the song live in concert 151 times from 1975 to 2009, and three of the live versions have been officially released. The White Stripes, Robert Plant and Tom Jones have all covered the song on albums.

== Background and recording ==
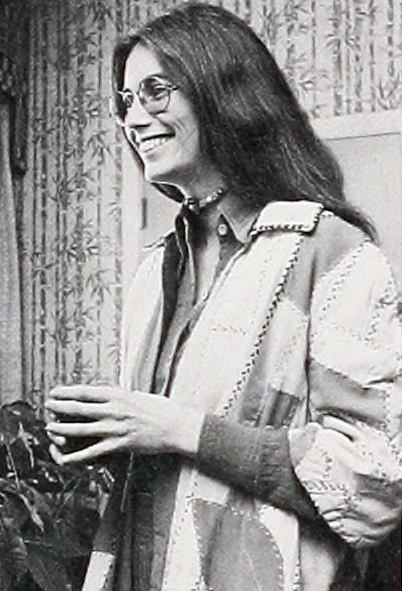
Emmylou Harris sang with Dylan on the album track.

"One More Cup of Coffee (Valley Below)" was the first song that Dylan wrote after the release of his critically acclaimed album Blood on the Tracks on January 20, 1975, (Note: Some sources state the release date of Blood on the Tracks as January 17, 1975) and the only one completed by June 1975. In the preceding 18 months, he had topped the Billboard 200 charts for the first time; both Planet Waves (1974) and Blood on the Tracks reached number one. Dylan wrote the song after visiting a Romani celebration at Saintes-Maries-de-la-Mer in France on his 34th birthday.

Somebody took me there to the gypsy high holy days which coincide with my own particular birthday ... hanging out there for a week probably influenced the writing of that song. But the "valley below" probably came from someplace else. My feeling about the song was that the verses came from someplace else. It wasn't about anything, so this "valley below" thing became the fixture to hang it on. But "valley below" could mean anything.

Dylan said in 1978 that he had met a "gypsy king" during his stay in France, and that "in the Gypsy way of life, death is a very happy thing." Dylan biographer Clinton Heylin wrote that "One More Cup of Coffee (Valley Below)" takes the perspective of a man who is "lying with a young gypsy consort, by implication the gypsy king's daughter, but is only going through the motions" as he is preoccupied with thought of "the valley below".

One take of the song was recorded on July 28, 1975. That day's sessions featured a large band including Dylan (guitar, vocal), Emmylou Harris (vocals), Eric Clapton, Vinnie Bell, Neil Hubbard, Perry Lederman, and Jim Mullen (all guitar), Erik Frandsen (slide guitar), Rob Stoner (bass), Alan Spenner (bass), Scarlet Rivera (violin), Sheena Seidenberg (tenor saxophone), Mel Collins (tenor saxophone), Sugar Blue (harmonica), Dom Cortese (mandolin/accordion), Michael Lawrence (trumpet), Tony O'Malley (keyboards), Jody Linscott (percussion), John Sussewell (drums), and Dyan Birch, Francis Collins, and Paddy McHugh (background vocals). There were three takes on July 30, at Studio E, Columbia Recording Studios (New York), with a smaller group: Dylan, Harris, Rivera, Stoner, Seidenberg (percussion) and Howard Wyeth (drums). The version of the song released on Desire in January 1976 was the first of the three takes recorded on July 30.

Harris, who sang on the track with Dylan, later said that she had been contacted by producer Don DeVito to join the recording sessions for Desire, and that she "basically shook hands and started recording." In Harris's account, she did not know the songs before the recording sessions, and, with a copy of the lyrics to hand, "the band would start playing and [Dylan] would kind of poke me when he wanted me to jump in. Somehow I watched his mouth with one eye and the lyrics with the other." Harris was unhappy with the quality of her performance, but her request to redo it was rejected. Dylan's vocal performance was unusual. Allen Ginsberg described it as "Hebraic cantillation never heard before in U.S. song, ancient blood singing." Jack Garner of The Bellingham Herald wrote that Dylan's Hebraic chant technique represented "the first time his Jewishness has been in the forefront of his music."

Critic Oliver Trager refers to the song as a "Spanish-tinged narrative depicting a melodrama in miniature". The authors of Bob Dylan All the Songs: The Story Behind Every Track, Philippe Margotin and Jean-Michel Guesdon, describe the song's narrator as "bewitched by a young gypsy" and suggest that "the songwriter seems to say that between love and death, the borderline is sometimes tenuous." American Studies academic Michael Denning wrote of "One More Cup of Coffee (Valley Below)" that "With its Andalusian chord progression, it is one of those classic Dylan songs that have virtually no lyric content, or – rather – whose lyric content has been so concentrated in the great chorus that the verses are almost an afterthought". In this respect, he compares it to Dylan's earlier "I Shall Be Released" and "Knockin' on Heaven's Door". The chorus is:

One more cup of coffee for the road
One more cup of coffee 'fore I go
To the valley below

The start of the track on Desire features a bass guitar solo by Stoner. Stoner said in an interview in Mojo in 2012 that this was unplanned and that he played it because recording had started but violinist Scarlet Rivera was not ready and Dylan was just strumming his own guitar. Stoner told the interviewer: "somebody better play something, so I start playin' a bass solo. Basically the run-through become the first takes."

The track was released as a single in Japan in April 1976, with "Romance in Durango" as the B-side. It was also included on a seven-track extended play release in Japan the same year.

== Live performances ==
According to Bob Dylan's official website, he has played the song live in concert 151 times, between 1975 and 2009. His first concert performance of the song was during the Rolling Thunder Revue tour, on October 30, 1975. Heylin felt that during the Rolling Thunder Revue tour, "all the best parts of the two arrangements now came together as a contiguous whole, supporting a truly haunting lead vocal." During one of the 1975 shows, Dylan told the audience about his visit to the Romani festival on his birthday, and meeting the "king of the gypsies". Dylan said that as he was leaving, after a week, he was asked if he wanted anything, and that he requested "a cup of coffee. Just one more cup of coffee for the road" and, having received one in a bag, he stood looking at the ocean and "it was like [I was] looking at it in the valley below where I was standing." According to Trager, The Rolling Thunder Revue shows were "shaped by Scarlet Rivera's signature violin sound", whilst performances in 1978 were "dramatically transformed ... with an endearingly campy herky-jerky arrangement that included a sensual conga riff, a sax solo by Steve Douglas, and some fine vocals. Dylan did not play the song live from December 1978 until June 1988, and them played it only eight times in six years, on what has been dubbed the "Never Ending Tour".

== Critical reception ==
Hugh Cutler of The Morning News felt that the track was "immeasurably enhanced" by Harris, and that Dylan's vocals were "spine-tingling". Garner called the song a "magnificent ballad". In The Los Angeles Times, Robert Hilburn called the track "an intense engaging portrait that deserves a place alongside Dylan's most arresting compositions." In a positive review in The Miami Herald, Bill Cosford wrote that Dylan, Harris and Rivera were "in perfect balance" on the track, adding that the vocalists "sing not so much with as AT each other while the roving violin keeps the song just beyond easy description." Al Rudis of The Chapel Hill News described the sound as having "inflections of old Middle and Eastern European folk music" and as perhaps being influenced by the style of a cantor. He felt that Harris's singing "blend[ed] in beautifully" with Dylan's.

In 2015, Rolling Stone ranked "One More Cup of Coffee (Valley Below)" 69th on its list of the greatest Dylan songs. It was included on Edward Docx's list of "80 Bob Dylan songs everyone should know" in The Guardian in 2021.

== Credits and personnel ==
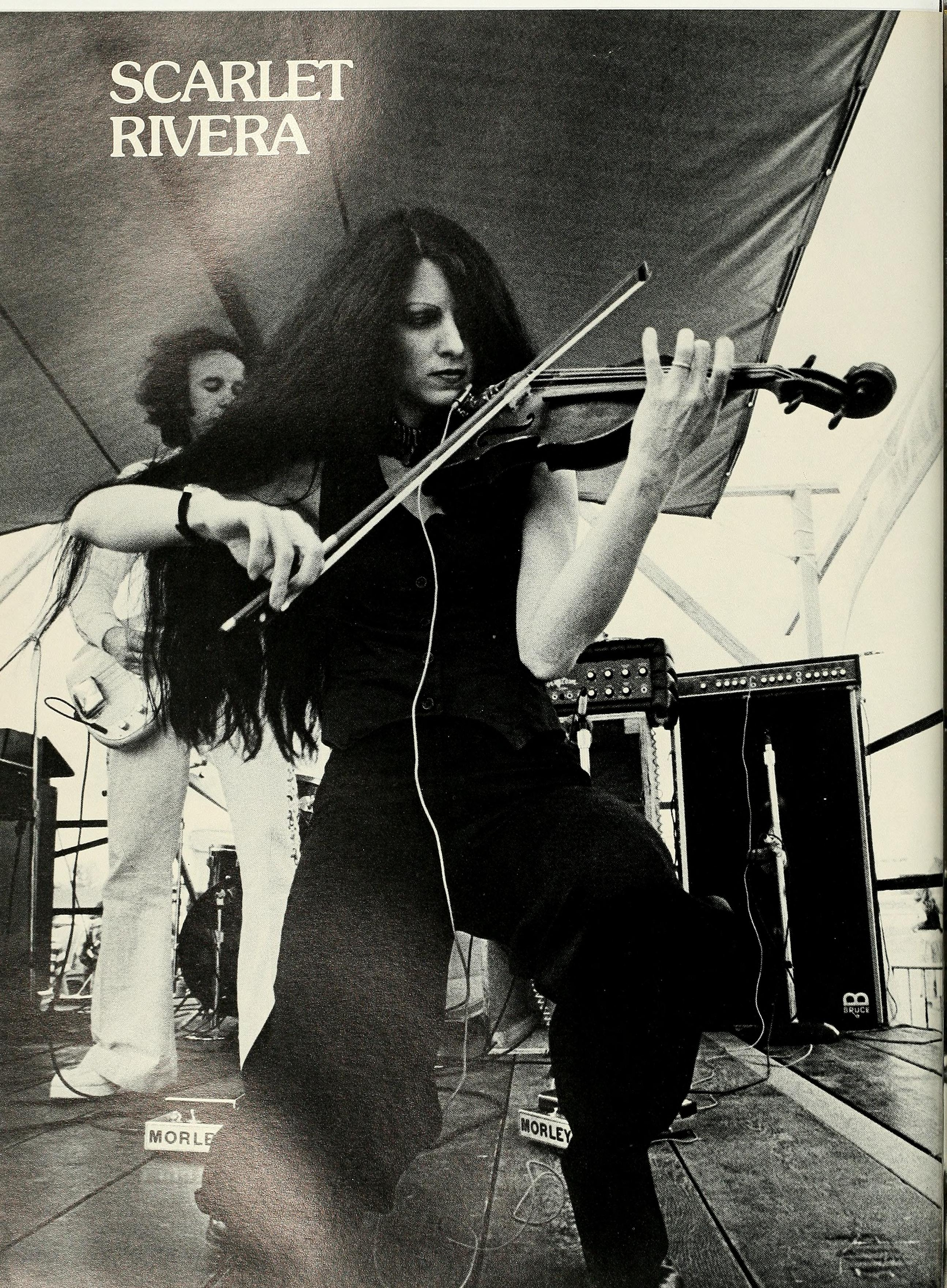
Scarlet Rivera played violin on the track

Credits adapted from the Bob Dylan All the Songs: The Story Behind Every Track book.

Musicians

- Bob Dylan – vocals, rhythm guitar
- Emmylou Harris – harmony vocals
- Scarlet Rivera – violin
- Rob Stoner – bass guitar
- Howard Wyeth – drums
- Sheena Seidenberg – percussion

Technical personnel

- Don DeVito – producer
- Don Meehan – sound engineering

== Cover versions ==
The White Stripes covered "One More Cup of Coffee (Valley Below)" on their debut album The White Stripes (1999). Henry Yates of Louder compared the track to "a bleak spaghetti-western drama". Brian Ives wrote of Robert Plant's cover on his album Dreamland (2002) that "Plant's subtle delivery combined with his band's pulling out the middle eastern themes in the music makes this version the definitive one." Sertab Erener's cover was used in the film Masked and Anonymous, which starred Dylan, and was praised by Heylin, who thought it was "a magnificent Middle Eastern arrangement" and the best of the various Dylan covers on the soundtrack. Bic Runga included the song on her albums Live in Concert with the Christchurch Symphony (2003) and Anthology (2012). The reviewer for The New Zealand Herald described the track as "accomplished if not quite upping the game". A version of the song by Tom Jones was included on his 2021 album Surrounded By Time, and was described by Robin Murray of Clash as "an intense yet sombre performance." Eric Burdon played the song during his 1976 live shows. His version also aired on the TV show Rockpalast in Germany.

== Official releases ==
Versions of the track have been released on the following Bob Dylan albums:

- Desire (1976)
- Masterpieces (1978)
- Bob Dylan at Budokan (1979)
- The Bootleg Series Vol. 5: Bob Dylan Live 1975, The Rolling Thunder Revue (2002)
- Bob Dylan – The Rolling Thunder Revue: The 1975 Live Recordings (2019)

EP and single (Japan, 1976)

- "Bob Dylan" – 7" stereo extended play (CBS/Sony 08EP 17)
- "One More Cup Of Coffee"/"Romance in Durango" – 7" stereo single (CBS/Sony 06SP 1)
