= Masterpieces (Bob Dylan album) =

Greatest hits album by Bob Dylan
- Released: March 12, 1978
- Recorded: 1962–1976
- Genre: Folk rock; country
- Length: 164:15
- Label: CBS
- Producer: Gordon Carroll; Rick Danko; Don DeVito; Bob Dylan; Rob Fraboni; John H. Hammond; Levon Helm; Garth Hudson; Bob Johnston; Richard Manuel; Robbie Robertson; Leon Russell; Tom Wilson

Bob Dylan chronology
Hard Rain (1976)	Masterpieces (1978)	Street-Legal (1978)

Professional ratings
Review scores
Source	Rating
AllMusic	4.5/5 stars

Masterpieces is a compilation album by American singer-songwriter Bob Dylan, released on March 12, 1978 by CBS. The triple LP set was released in Japan, Australia and New Zealand in anticipation of his 1978 tour. Primarily a greatest hits collection spanning Dylan's career up to that point, the album features one previously unreleased track, a unique (1962) outtake version of "Mixed-Up Confusion". It also includes a live performance of "Just Like Tom Thumb's Blues" from Dylan's 1966 World Tour, which was first released as the B-side of his "I Want You" single in 1966. Masterpieces was reissued on CD in 1991 by Columbia (Cat. No. 4624489), but is no longer in print.

== Track listing ==
All tracks are written by Bob Dylan, except where noted.

Side one
No.	Title	Writer(s)	From	Length
1.	"Knockin' on Heaven's Door"		Pat Garrett & Billy the Kid	2:30
2.	"Mr. Tambourine Man"		Bringing It All Back Home	5:29
3.	"Just Like a Woman"		Blonde on Blonde	4:56
4.	"I Shall Be Released"		Bob Dylan's Greatest Hits Vol. II	3:05
5.	"Tears of Rage"	Dylan, Richard Manuel	The Basement Tapes	4:14
6.	"All Along the Watchtower"		John Wesley Harding	2:32
7.	"One More Cup of Coffee (Valley Below)"		Desire	3:47
Total length:				26:33

Side two
No.	Title	From	Length
1.	"Like a Rolling Stone" (Live at Isle of Wight Festival, 1969)	Self Portrait	5:17
2.	"Quinn the Eskimo (The Mighty Quinn)" (Live at Isle of Wight Festival, 1969)	Self Portrait	2:49
3.	"Tomorrow Is a Long Time" (Live at Town Hall 1963)	Bob Dylan's Greatest Hits Vol. II	3:02
4.	"Lay, Lady, Lay" (Live 1976)	Hard Rain	5:00
5.	"Idiot Wind" (Live 1976)	Hard Rain	10:06
Total length:			26:14

Side three
No.	Title	Writer(s)	From	Length
1.	"Mixed-Up Confusion"		The Freewheelin' Bob Dylan session outtake	2:30
2.	"Positively 4th Street"		single 1965	3:56
3.	"Can You Please Crawl Out Your Window?"		single 1965	3:35
4.	"Just Like Tom Thumb's Blues" (live version recorded at Odeon Theatre, Liverpool, England, May 14, 1966)		B-side of 1966 "I Want You" single	5:40
5.	"Spanish Is the Loving Tongue"	Traditional	B-side of 1971 "Watching the River Flow" single	3:38
6.	"George Jackson"		"Big Band" version, single, 1971	5:38
7.	"Rita May"	Dylan, Jacques Levy	single, 1976	3:13
Total length:				28:10

Side four
No.	Title	Writer(s)	From	Length
1.	"Blowin' in the Wind"		The Freewheelin' Bob Dylan	2:47
2.	"A Hard Rain's a-Gonna Fall"		The Freewheelin' Bob Dylan	6:54
3.	"The Times They Are a-Changin'"		The Times They Are a-Changin'	3:16
4.	"Masters of War"		The Freewheelin' Bob Dylan	4:33
5.	"Hurricane"	Dylan, Levy	Desire	8:36
Total length:				26:06

Side five
No.	Title	Writer(s)	From	Length
1.	"Maggie's Farm" (Live 1976)		Hard Rain	5:30
2.	"Subterranean Homesick Blues"		Bringing It All Back Home	2:20
3.	"Ballad of a Thin Man"		Highway 61 Revisited	5:57
4.	"Mozambique"	Dylan, Levy	Desire	3:01
5.	"This Wheel's on Fire"	Rick Danko, Dylan	The Basement Tapes	3:52
6.	"I Want You"		Blonde on Blonde	3:09
7.	"Rainy Day Women #12 & 35"		Blonde on Blonde	4:38
Total length:				22:57

Side six
No.	Title	From	Length
1.	"Don't Think Twice, It's All Right"	The Freewheelin' Bob Dylan	3:40
2.	"Song to Woody"	Bob Dylan	2:41
3.	"It Ain't Me Babe"	Another Side of Bob Dylan	3:35
4.	"Love Minus Zero/No Limit"	Bringing It All Back Home	2:50
5.	"I'll Be Your Baby Tonight"	John Wesley Harding	2:39
6.	"If Not for You"	New Morning	2:44
7.	"If You See Her, Say Hello"	Blood on the Tracks	4:48
8.	"Sara"	Desire	5:31
Total length:			28:28

== Certifications and sales ==
Region	Certification	Certified units/sales
Australia (ARIA)	3× Platinum	210,000^{^}
New Zealand (RMNZ)	2× Platinum	30,000^{^}
^{^} Shipments figures based on certification alone.
