= The Bootleg Series Vol. 5: Bob Dylan Live 1975, The Rolling Thunder Revue =

Live album by Bob Dylan
- Released: November 26, 2002
- Recorded: November 19–21 and December 4, 1975
- Genres: Folk rock; rock and roll
- Length: 101:48
- Label: Columbia
- Producers: Steve Berkowitz; Jeff Rosen

Bob Dylan chronology
Love and Theft (2001)	The Bootleg Series Vol. 5: Bob Dylan Live 1975, The Rolling Thunder Revue (2002)	The Bootleg Series Vol. 6: Bob Dylan Live 1964, Concert at Philharmonic Hall (2004)

Bob Dylan Bootleg Series chronology
Vol. 4: Bob Dylan Live 1966, The "Royal Albert Hall" Concert (1998)	Vol. 5: Bob Dylan Live 1975, The Rolling Thunder Revue (2002)	Vol. 6: Bob Dylan Live 1964, Concert at Philharmonic Hall (2004)

The Bootleg Series Vol. 5: Bob Dylan Live 1975, The Rolling Thunder Revue is a live album by Bob Dylan released by Columbia Records in 2002. The third installment in the ongoing Bob Dylan Bootleg Series on Legacy Records, it documents the Rolling Thunder Revue led by Dylan prior to the release of the album Desire. Until the release of this album, the only official live documentation of the Rolling Thunder Revue was Hard Rain, recorded during the less critically well received second leg of the tour.

The two-disc set received a warm reception from critics and fans, although some lamented that it does not document, or emulate, a typical complete show from the tour. Fans have also expressed exasperation at the omission of certain revered performances, notably the cover of Johnny Ace's "Never Let Me Go".

A bonus DVD accompanying the initial release of this album features two video excerpts from Dylan's 1978 film Renaldo and Clara: a November 21, 1975, performance of "Tangled Up in Blue" (included in audio form on the main album) and a December 4, 1975, performance of "Isis" (which had been included in audio form on the 1985 compilation Biograph). It spent nine weeks on the chart and was certified and awarded a gold record on March 12, 2003, by the RIAA. The album reached number 69 in the U.K.

Professional ratings
Review scores
Source	Rating
AllMusic	4.5/5 stars
The Encyclopedia of Popular Music	4/5 stars
Music Box	4/5 stars
Stylus Magazine	A+
Tiny Mix Tapes	5/5 stars

A more comprehensive 14-disc collection entitled Bob Dylan – The Rolling Thunder Revue: The 1975 Live Recordings was released in 2019 to coincide with the film Rolling Thunder Revue: A Bob Dylan Story by Martin Scorsese. At that time, The Bootleg Series Vol. 5 was re-issued on vinyl.

== Track listing ==
All tracks are written by Bob Dylan, except where noted. All songs recorded live in concert.

Disc one
No.	Title	Place and date	Length
1.	"Tonight I'll Be Staying Here with You"	Montreal Forum, Canada, December 4, 1975	3:55
2.	"It Ain't Me Babe"	Harvard Square Theatre, Cambridge, Massachusetts, November 20, 1975	5:25
3.	"A Hard Rain's a-Gonna Fall"	Montreal Forum, Canada, December 4, 1975	5:16
4.	"The Lonesome Death of Hattie Carroll"	Boston Music Hall, November 21, 1975 (second show)	5:25
5.	"Romance in Durango" (Bob Dylan, Jacques Levy)	Harvard Square Theatre, Cambridge, Massachusetts, November 20, 1975	5:22
6.	"Isis" (Bob Dylan, Jacques Levy)	Boston Music Hall, November 21, 1975 (second show)	5:11
7.	"Mr. Tambourine Man"	Boston Music Hall, November 21, 1975 (first show)	5:39
8.	"Simple Twist of Fate"	Harvard Square Theatre, Cambridge, Massachusetts, November 20, 1975	4:17
9.	"Blowin' in the Wind"	Boston Music Hall, November 21, 1975 (second show)	2:43
10.	"Mama, You Been on My Mind"	Harvard Square Theatre, Cambridge, Massachusetts, November 20, 1975	3:11
11.	"I Shall Be Released"	Boston Music Hall, November 21, 1975 (first show)	4:33
Total length:			50:57

Disc two
No.	Title	Place and date	Length
1.	"It's All Over Now, Baby Blue"	Montreal Forum, Canada, December 4, 1975	4:34
2.	"Love Minus Zero/No Limit"	Montreal Forum, Canada, December 4, 1975	3:13
3.	"Tangled Up in Blue"	Boston Music Hall, November 21, 1975 (second show)	4:41
4.	"The Water Is Wide" (traditional)	Boston Music Hall, November 21, 1975 (second show)	5:16
5.	"It Takes a Lot to Laugh, It Takes a Train to Cry"	Boston Music Hall, November 21, 1975 (second show)	3:12
6.	"Oh, Sister" (Bob Dylan, Jacques Levy)	Boston Music Hall, November 21, 1975 (second show)	4:04
7.	"Hurricane" (Bob Dylan, Jacques Levy)	Memorial Auditorium, Worcester, MA, November 19, 1975	8:15
8.	"One More Cup of Coffee (Valley Below)"	Boston Music Hall, November 21, 1975 (second show)	4:14
9.	"Sara"	Boston Music Hall, November 21, 1975 (second show)	4:29
10.	"Just Like a Woman"	Boston Music Hall, November 21, 1975 (second show)	4:31
11.	"Knockin' on Heaven's Door"	Harvard Square Theatre, Cambridge, Massachusetts, November 20, 1975	4:22
Total length:			50:51

== Personnel ==
- Bob Dylan — vocals, electric and acoustic guitar, harmonica
- Joan Baez — vocals, acoustic guitar, percussion on "Blowin' in the Wind", "Mama, You Been on My Mind", "I Shall Be Released", and "The Water Is Wide"
- Ronee Blakley — vocals
- T-Bone Burnett — electric guitar, piano
- David Mansfield — Dobro, mandolin, violin, steel guitar
- Roger McGuinn — electric guitar, vocals on "Knockin' on Heaven's Door"
- Bob Neuwirth — acoustic guitar, vocals
- Scarlet Rivera — violin
- Luther Rix — percussion, conga, drums
- Mick Ronson — electric guitar
- Steven Soles — acoustic guitar and electric guitar, vocals
- Rob Stoner — bass
- Howie Wyeth — drums, piano

Technical personnel

- Steve Berkowitz, Jeff Rosen — production
- Don DeVito — recording supervision
- Michael Brauer — mixing
- Greg Calbi — mastering
- Ricardo Chavarria — mixing assistance
- Lisa Buckler, Charlie Sarrica — production coordination
- Triana Dorazio — package manager
- Geoff Gans — art direction, design
- James L. Hunter — graphic design
- Ken Regan — photography
- Darren Salmieri — artist coordination

== Charts ==
Chart performance for The Bootleg Series Vol. 5: Bob Dylan Live 1975, The Rolling Thunder Revue
Chart (2002)	Peak position
French Albums (SNEP)	131
German Albums (Offizielle Top 100)	79
Italian Albums (FIMI)	38
Norwegian Albums (VG-lista)	9
Swedish Albums (Sverigetopplistan)	24
Swiss Albums (Schweizer Hitparade)	81
UK Albums (Official Charts)	69
US Billboard 200	56

== Notes ==
The "Blowin' in the Wind" and "Mama, You Been on My Mind" duets of Dylan and Baez on disc one were originally listed in reverse order on bobdylan.com. However, the respective recording dates of 20 November 1975 in Cambridge and 21 November 1975 (evening show) in Boston were not changed on the final insert. Baez' spoken intro to "Mama, You Been on My Mind" is said to be from Cambridge, not Boston, while "Blowin' in the Wind" is said to be from Boston.
