= Sara (Bob Dylan song) =

1976 song by Bob Dylan

Song by Bob Dylan

from the album Desire
- Released: January 5, 1976
- Recorded: July 31, 1975
- Genre: Folk rock
- Length: 5:29
- Label: Columbia
- Songwriter: Bob Dylan
- Producer: Don DeVito

Desire track listing
- 9 tracks Side one: 1. "Hurricane"; 2. "Isis"; 3. "Mozambique"; 4. "One More Cup of Coffee (Valley Below)"; 5. "Oh, Sister"; Side two: 6. "Joey"; 7. "Romance in Durango"; 8. "Black Diamond Bay"; 9. "Sara"

Official audio
- "Sara" on YouTube

"Sara" is a song from Bob Dylan's 1976 album Desire. It is the closing song on the album. Unlike many of the songs on the album, which were written by Dylan and Jacques Levy, "Sara" was written solely by Dylan, as an autobiographical account of his estrangement from then-wife Sara Dylan. It was recorded on July 31, 1975.

== Background and recording ==
The song is named after Dylan's wife at the time, and the song alludes to their earlier relationship, including the couple's children together. In his book Down The Highway: The Life of Bob Dylan, Howard Sounes quoted Jacques Levy's account of the recording of the song, stating that Sara was present at the studio and listened "from the other side of the glass" as Dylan played the song. According to Larry Sloman, Dylan turned to Sara just before beginning the song, and stated, "This one's for you."

The song contains the line "Staying up for days in the Chelsea hotel / Writing 'Sad Eyed Lady of the Lowlands' for you," a reference to the Hotel Chelsea, where Dylan had resided in the 1960s. It is also the only instance of Dylan deliberately quoting one of his own song titles in the lyrics of another song.

That first take of the song, recorded on July 31, 1975, in New York City, at Columbia Recording Studios, Studio E., is reportedly the one featured on the album. Bob and Sara reconciled after the recording of the song but would divorce in 1977.

== Reception ==
"Sara" has been called one of Dylan's best love songs. The Irish Times stated the song was "as beautiful an expression of the preciousness and frailty of human love as has ever been put on a record." Rolling Stone called the song perhaps his most personal song in his career. "Sara" was also featured at No. 48 on Rolling Stone's list of 100 Greatest Bob Dylan Songs.

=== Other versions ===
In 2002, a live version of the song from the 1975 Rolling Thunder Revue tour was featured on The Bootleg Series Vol. 5: Bob Dylan Live 1975, The Rolling Thunder Revue. In 2019, that recording and four other live performances of the song from the tour were released on the box set The Rolling Thunder Revue: The 1975 Live Recordings.

In 2004 researcher Kim Beissel claimed that "Sara" was the basis for Nick Cave’s 1997 song "Where Do We Go Now, But Nowhere?"

=== Personnel ===
- Bob Dylan – vocals, guitar, harmonica
- Scarlet Rivera – violin
- Rob Stoner – bass
- Howard Wyeth – drums
