= Isis (song) =

1976 song by Bob Dylan

Song by Bob Dylan

from the album Desire
- Released: January 5, 1976
- Recorded: July 31, 1975
- Genre: Folk rock
- Length: 6:58
- Label: Columbia
- Songwriters: Bob Dylan; Jacques Levy
- Producer: Don DeVito

Desire track listing
- 9 tracks Side one: 1. "Hurricane"; 2. "Isis"; 3. "Mozambique"; 4. "One More Cup of Coffee (Valley Below)"; 5. "Oh, Sister"; Side two: 6. "Joey"; 7. "Romance in Durango"; 8. "Black Diamond Bay"; 9. "Sara"

Official audio
- "Isis" on YouTube

"Isis" is a ballad written by Bob Dylan in collaboration with Jacques Levy, in July 1975. The song is the second track on Dylan's 1976 album Desire. The song, which features allusions to ancient Egypt, including sharing its title with an Egyptian goddess, has been characterized by Dylan as a song "about marriage".

== Description ==
This song is in a moderately fast 3/4 time, in the key of B-flat major. The arrangement is based on rhythm chords played on acoustic piano, accompanied by bass guitar, drums, and violin. The harmonic progression consists of an ostinato using the following chords throughout:

I–VII♭–IV–I
B♭–A♭–E♭–B♭

The lyrics are all verses; there is no chorus. The melody is in the style of a modal folk song, emphasizing the tonic and dominant notes in the scale, with leaps of a fifth in between them. The mode is Mixolydian with a major third in the harmony, but Dylan's delivery of the melody and Scarlet Rivera's violin accompaniment use a flatted third as in the blues. Dylan ends the performance with a brief upward glissando on the piano.

== Song narrative ==
"Isis" tells the tale of a man (the narrator) who married an enigmatic woman ("a mystical child") named Isis. The story covers his separation from her, his subsequent adventure and, ultimately, his return. The marriage took place "on the fifth day of May," (an allusion to Cinco de Mayo, one of several Mexican themes found in Dylan's songs during the 1970s). After the wedding, he "could not hold on to her very long", so he "cut off his hair and rode straight away for the wild unknown country..." He reaches a "high place" divided by a line "through the center of town" into "darkness and light." He hitches his pony and enters a laundry, as though to wash himself of his past. He meets and falls in with a shady character who promises "something easy to catch." The man suggests a search for a body and they ride "to the pyramids all embedded in ice". They carry on in freezing conditions until the bounty-hunting companion dies. The narrator breaks into the empty tomb ("the casket was empty"), finds no treasure, and realizes the adventure had been a fool’s errand. He leaves his dead companion in the tomb, says a quick prayer, and rides back to Isis, whom he still loves. He sees Isis in a meadow and when she asks him if he is going to stay this time, he replies, "If you want me to, yes!".

== Writing ==
It was the writing collaboration on "Isis" between Dylan and Jacques Levy that eventually led to the full album Desire. One night, Dylan met Levy at his loft and showed him an early draft of "Isis." According to Levy, "Isis" began life as a "slow dirge", unlike anything he had ever heard before, which he felt gave the appearance of setting the listener up "for a long story". When Dylan first played this embryonic version for him, the two of them started working together. According to Levy, it was an enjoyable song-writing partnership, with Levy writing words and Dylan contributing ideas. The session lasted until the early hours of the morning, after which Dylan and Levy went to a Greenwich Village music club, The Other End. Dylan read the lyrics to the gathered crowd, to favorable reactions. The partnership went on to pen "Hurricane" and other tracks later featured on Desire.

"Isis" was written and recorded during a time of separation and reunion in Dylan's own marriage; consequently, for fans and critics the temptation to interpret it as an allegory of Dylan's own marital difficulties is irresistible, especially since the Desire album contains the song "Sara" which is openly about their marriage and separation. Dylan was known to include autobiographical hints in his previous songs. "Isis" draws upon mythological themes of a male hero separating from his wife, going on adventures, and returning to the marriage, going back to the Odyssey.

== Personnel ==
- Bob Dylan – vocals, piano and harmonica
- Scarlet Rivera – violin
- Rob Stoner – bass guitar
- Howie Wyeth – drums

== Live performances ==
Dylan did an up-tempo live version of the song with the Rolling Thunder Revue in 1975. A performance taped on this tour on December 4, 1975, was included in the 1978 film Renaldo and Clara, and released in video form in 2002 on a bonus DVD accompanying the initial release of The Bootleg Series Vol. 5: Bob Dylan Live 1975, The Rolling Thunder Revue. The audio recording of this performance had been released on the 1978 promotional EP 4 Songs from "Renaldo and Clara" and the 1985 compilation album Biograph. Dylan is heard introducing the piece as "a song about marriage," and adds "This one's for Leonard, if you're still here!" referring to Leonard Cohen (the performance was recorded in Montreal, Cohen's birthplace). Another live version of the song, recorded on a tour date the previous month, appeared in audio format only on The Bootleg Series Vol. 5. In 2019, these two performances and four other live renditions of the song from the 1975 tour were released on the box set The Rolling Thunder Revue: The 1975 Live Recordings, along with two full-length rehearsals.

According to Dylan's official website, as of August 2020 Dylan has played "Isis" live 46 times. All performances were in 1975 and 1976.

== Influence ==
Fiona Apple, in a 2020 interview with Pitchfork, cited Desire as her favorite Dylan album and credited "Isis" with giving her a "sexual awakening": "And on the song 'Isis', he sort of gave me my sexual awakening a little bit. When he goes, 'She said, 'You look different', I said, 'Well, I guess'/[...] She said, ‘You going to stay?’ I said, ‘If you want me to, yes’'—when he says 'Well, I guess', I was like: ooooh".

== Cover versions ==
The White Stripes covered it live many times during their career.

Ryan Adams covered it live at a Dylan tribute concert in 2006.
