= Mozambique (song) =

1976 song by Bob Dylan

Single by Bob Dylan

from the album Desire
- B-side: "Oh, Sister"
- Released: February 17, 1976
- Recorded: July 30, 1975
- Studio: Columbia Studios, New York City
- Genre: Folk rock
- Length: 3:00
- Label: Columbia
- Songwriters: Bob Dylan; Jacques Levy
- Producer: Don DeVito

Bob Dylan singles chronology
"Hurricane" (1975)	"Mozambique" (1976)	"Stuck Inside of Mobile with the Memphis Blues Again (Live)" (1976)

Desire track listing
- 9 tracks Side one: 1. "Hurricane"; 2. "Isis"; 3. "Mozambique"; 4. "One More Cup of Coffee (Valley Below)"; 5. "Oh, Sister"; Side two: 6. "Joey"; 7. "Romance in Durango"; 8. "Black Diamond Bay"; 9. "Sara"

Official audio
- "Mozambique" on YouTube

"Mozambique" is a song written by Bob Dylan and Jacques Levy that was originally released on Dylan's 1976 album Desire. It was also released as a single and reached number 54 on the Billboard Hot 100.

== Background ==
At the time of the song's release, the titular country of Mozambique had just emerged from a ten-year insurgency war against Portugal which led to Mozambique's independence. Mozambique had gained independence on June 25, 1975, only about a month before the song was recorded. As a result, some supporters wanted to see the song as lending support to the newly independent country. However, the lyrics of the song do not support such an interpretation, being slight and treating the country as merely a place for a romantic getaway in the sun, apart from a fleeting reference to "people living free". This amused some of Dylan's fans, who did understand the satire.

== Analysis ==
The melody received more praise than the lyrics. Robert Shelton describes the tune as "playful." Oliver Trager and John Nogowski both describe the melody as "great" and particularly praise the violin playing of Scarlet Rivera.

Record World said that "The sound is different with Emmylou Harris singing along over a twisting beat, but the story is pure Dylan and that's enough to make it worth a listen." Trager describes "Mozambique" as "a light love song with lighter political overtones." Allmusic critic Stephen Thomas Erlewine calls it "effervescent" and "Dylan at his breeziest." Paul Williams considers "Mozambique" to be one of several songs on Desire with "wonderful, inventive, pleasure-giving" music which nonetheless fails to reach the intensity and unity of the other songs because the lyrics are "a little too vague, too clever" and "too distanced." Dylan biographer Clinton Heylin considers the song to be a "ditty dredged up from the bottom of the barrel," "ghastly" and "the weakest song on Desire."

"Mozambique" was also released as a single as a follow-up to the Top 40 hit "Hurricane" and it reached #54 on the Billboard Hot 100. Heylin suggests that Dylan may have released it as a single over songs fans might have preferred—particularly "Sara"—to spite fans who criticized the song for its slight lyrics trivializing the conflict in Mozambique. Cashbox said of it that it is "an exotic, lush and exciting tune to hear" and that "Dylan is in fine form, spinning out his tale of 'magic in a magical land,' and playing superb rhythm guitar."

The song also appeared on the compilation album Masterpieces. A live performance was included in the television special Hard Rain but not on the associated album.

== Jimmy Buffett and Emmylou Harris version ==
"Mozambique"

Song by Jimmy Buffett and Emmylou Harris

from the album Equal Strain on All Parts
- Released: November 3, 2023
- Genre: Tropical rock; folk rock
- Length: 3:16
- Label: Mailboat
- Songwriters: Bob Dylan; Jacques Levy
- Producers: Mac McAnally; Michael Utley

Music video
- "Mozambique" on YouTube

Jimmy Buffett and Emmylou Harris recorded a cover version that was released on November 3, 2023, as part of Buffett's posthumous album Equal Strain on All Parts. A video for the song, featuring footage of Buffett and Harris singing live in the studio, was released in advance of the album on YouTube on October 13, 2023.
