= Romance in Durango =

1976 song by Bob Dylan

Song by Bob Dylan

from the album Desire
- Released: January 5, 1976
- Recorded: July 28, 1975
- Studio: Columbia Recording Studios (New York City)
- Genre: Folk rock
- Length: 5:50
- Label: Columbia
- Songwriters: Bob Dylan; Jacques Levy
- Producer: Don DeVito

Desire track listing
- 9 tracks Side one: 1. "Hurricane"; 2. "Isis"; 3. "Mozambique"; 4. "One More Cup of Coffee (Valley Below)"; 5. "Oh, Sister"; Side two: 6. "Joey"; 7. "Romance in Durango"; 8. "Black Diamond Bay"; 9. "Sara"

"Romance in Durango" is the seventh song (or the second song on Side 2 of the vinyl) on Bob Dylan's 1976 album Desire. It was written by Dylan and Jacques Levy, who collaborated with Dylan on most of the songs on the album. The chorus contains several lines sung in Spanish, resulting in the song being released as a single in Spain in 1977. It was also released as a b-side to the Japanese single of "One More Cup of Coffee (Valley Below)" in 1976. The song was produced by Don DeVito.

== Composition and recording ==
"Romance in Durango" is one of many narrative songs on Desire (perhaps reflecting the influence of co-writer Jacques Levy who was known primarily as a theater director). The first-person narrator tells of an adventure in Durango, Mexico, where Sam Peckinpah's Pat Garrett and Billy the Kid, which Dylan both scored and acted in, had been filmed in 1972 and 1973. In their book Bob Dylan All the Songs: The Story Behind Every Track, authors Philippe Margotin and Jean-Michel Guesdon note that the "story of the song is similar to a cowboy movie scenario. An outlaw and his lover are on the run...with a posse of sheriffs and bounty hunters on their trail. But it is also a typically Dylanesque story, in the sense that the main character of the song is haunted by his murder of a close friend named Ramon".

The song is performed in the key of D major and its arrangement has, according to Dylan scholar Tony Attwood, "a Mexican feel" imparted through the instrumentation ("the trumpet calls") and percussion ("the rhythms associated with Central American music"). It is often described as a musical and lyrical descendant of Marty Robbins' classic country-western song "El Paso". The studio version features twenty musicians and backup singers, including Eric Clapton on guitar and Emmylou Harris on harmony vocals. It is the only recording from the earliest sessions of Desire that ended up on the album (before Dylan decided to shift to a more "small-band approach").

== Critical reception ==
"Romance in Durango" placed 79th on a Rolling Stone list of the "100 Greatest Bob Dylan Songs". In an article accompanying the list, Scott Avett of The Avett Brothers praised the song's melody and lyrics: "The melody of 'Romance in Durango' makes the whole song work; it’s so serious and driven. And like most of Desire and Blood on the Tracks, it is relatively repetitive, but it’s so good it can kind of just keep going and going. That’s really much harder to do than I think anybody who isn’t trying to make music knows. As far as the lyrics go, it’s an amazing endeavor; Dylan was able to put his mind and heart into a specific scene – of being a lone renegade in the desert, up to all these trying and dangerous things. You’re buying all the masculinities and going right along with it. It’s convincing".

Writer and radio talk show host Scott Bunn has discussed the song as a musical equivalent of the "Acid Western" film subgenre.

== Live performances ==
According to his official website, Dylan has played the song 37 times in concert between 1975 and 2003. Five of these live versions, all from 1975, have been officially released (one on the Biograph box set in 1985, one on The Bootleg Series Vol. 5: Bob Dylan Live 1975, The Rolling Thunder Revue album in 2002 and another three versions on the Bob Dylan – The Rolling Thunder Revue: The 1975 Live Recordings box set in 2019, which additionally features a rehearsal version of the song). Dylan performed it only once after 1976, at the Hammersmith Apollo in London in 2003, a performance cited by Dylanologist Egil Mosbron as one of his best from that year.

== In popular culture ==
A live version of the song from the Montreal Forum in 1975, the same one originally released on Biograph, plays over the closing credits of Martin Scorsese's 2019 documentary Rolling Thunder Revue: A Bob Dylan Story by Martin Scorsese. "Romance in Durango" is featured on the soundtrack in the movie Savages (2012).

== Notable covers ==
"Romance in Durango" has been covered by at least eight other artists. Among the most notable versions:

- Massimo Bubola translated it into Italian (as "Avventura a Durango", which uses Neapolitan to stand in for the Spanish lyrics in the original song) for Fabrizio De André's album Rimini in 1978.
- Raimundo Fagner sang a Portuguese version (as "Romance no Deserto") on his album Romance no Deserto in 1987.
- Julie Felix released a version on her 2002 album Starry Eyed and Laughing.
