= Renaldo and Clara =

1978 film by Bob Dylan

- Theatrical release poster
- Directed by: Bob Dylan
- Written by: Bob Dylan
- Produced by: Mel Howard
- Starring: Bob Dylan; Joan Baez
- Cinematography: Howard Alk; David Myers; Paul Goldsmith
- Edited by: Bob Dylan; Howard Alk
- Music by: Various artists
- Distributed by: Circuit Films
- Release date: January 25, 1978
- Running time: 232 minutes
- Country: United States
- Language: English
- Budget: $4 million
- Box office: $500,000 (domestic)

Renaldo and Clara is a 1978 American film directed by Bob Dylan and starring Bob Dylan, Sara Dylan and Joan Baez. Written by Dylan and Sam Shepard, the film incorporates three distinct film genres: concert footage, documentary interviews, and dramatic fictional vignettes reflective of Dylan's song lyrics and life.

Filmed in the fall of 1975 prior to and during Bob Dylan's Rolling Thunder Revue tour, the film features appearances and performances by Phil Ochs, Ronee Blakley, T-Bone Burnett, Ramblin' Jack Elliott, Allen Ginsberg, Arlo Guthrie, Ronnie Hawkins, Roger McGuinn, Joni Mitchell, Mick Ronson, Arlen Roth, Sam Shepard, Anne Waldman, and Harry Dean Stanton. Renaldo and Clara was released in its original four-hour form on January 25, 1978, in the United States. Its limited release in theaters in New York City, Los Angeles, and other cities was discontinued after a few weeks following widespread negative reviews.

== Production ==
Renaldo and Clara was influenced by the French film Les Enfants du Paradis, and was written by Dylan. Most of the performers are musicians or members of Dylan's inner circle; the only professional actors in the cast are Sam Shepard, Harry Dean Stanton, Helena Kallianiotes, and Ronee Blakley.

Many of the artists performing with the Rolling Thunder Revue are featured in the film, which also includes clips of concert performances and footage of Rubin Carter, the subject of Dylan's song "Hurricane". The film also features an appearance from the musician, David Blue, who gives some insight into the 1960s New York City folk music scene while playing a game of pinball. The machine was a Big Valley, built by Bally in 1970. The film also contains the last known footage of Phil Ochs, who is shown preparing to take the stage at Folk City in October 1975; he committed suicide six months later.

Poster Design and Title cards— John Kosh

== Cast ==
- Bob Dylan as Renaldo
- Sara Dylan as Clara
- Joan Baez as Woman in White
- Ronnie Hawkins as Bob Dylan
- Ronee Blakley as Mrs. Dylan
- Jack Elliott as Longheno de Castro
- Harry Dean Stanton as Lafkezio
- Bob Neuwirth as The Masked Tortilla
- Allen Ginsberg as The Father
- David Mansfield as The Son
- Helena Kallianiotes as herself
- Rubin "Hurricane" Carter as himself
- Scarlet Rivera as herself
- Roger McGuinn as himself
- David Blue as himself
- Joni Mitchell as herself
- Rob Stoner as himself
- Steven Soles as himself
- Mick Ronson as Security Guard
- Anne Waldman as Sister of Mercy
- T-Bone Burnett as The Inner Voice
- Larry Sloman as Newspaper Man
- Sam Shepard as Rodeo
- Howie Wyeth as himself
- Arlen Roth as himself
- Arlo Guthrie as Mandolin Player
- Roberta Flack as Guest Artist
- Phil Ochs as himself

== Reception ==
Upon its theatrical release in 1978, Renaldo and Clara received poor reviews, and, after opening in New York City and Los Angeles, its initial limited theatrical run was discontinued after a few weeks. The film was also shown in a film theatre in Hampstead, London, in a film theatre in Rialto, Dublin and in the Tyneside Cinema in Newcastle-upon-Tyne in May 1979.

Janet Maslin of The New York Times wrote in her review of the 1978 debut of Renaldo and Clara, "The film is full of connections to be made and riddles to be solved, but it approaches these things so dispassionately that the viewer has little choice but to follow suit. Even though Mr. Dylan makes it clear that he in no way wanted to make a concert film, the footage of him in performance provides not only the film's most electrifying moments but also its most emblematic ones"

Later in 1978, Dylan allowed a two-hour edit of the film to be distributed. The shortened version focused more on the concert footage and omitted many of the dramatic scenes.

After a small number of showings of the original version on European television, Dylan withdrew the film from distribution. It was shown in two parts 7–8 July 1980 on German television ZDF; on Finnish television 28 August 1982; 26 December 1983 (Boxing Day) on Channel 4 in the United Kingdom. The 4-hour version was also shown 29 May 2011 at the Glasgow Film Theatre.

As of 2021, the film has a Rotten Tomatoes score of 38% based on eight critic reviews, with an average rating of 4.5/10.

=== Accolades ===
This film received a dishonorable mention for Worst Picture at the first Stinkers Bad Movie Awards. It won in that category when the ballot for that year was revisited and expanded in 2003.

Date	Award	Category	Recipients	Result	Ref.
1979	Stinkers Bad Movie Awards	Worst Picture	Renaldo and Clara (Circuit Films)	Dishonourable Mention	
2003 (expanded ballot)	Stinkers Bad Movie Awards	Worst Picture	Renaldo and Clara (Circuit Films)	Won	
2003 (expanded ballot)	Stinkers Bad Movie Awards	Worst Director	Bob Dylan	Won	
2003 (expanded ballot)	Stinkers Bad Movie Awards	Worst Screenplay	Renaldo and Clara (Circuit Films)	Nominated	

== Legacy ==
Copies, made from recordings of the television broadcast, circulate among collectors. The only parts of the project to be released widely since its withdrawal are the excerpts found on the bonus DVD accompanying the initial release of Dylan's The Bootleg Series Vol. 5: Bob Dylan Live 1975, The Rolling Thunder Revue and in footage that was repurposed for the 2019 pseudo-documentary Rolling Thunder Revue: A Bob Dylan Story by Martin Scorsese. Footage from the film also appeared in the music video of Dylan's 1991 song "Series of Dreams".

== Soundtrack ==
- "When I Paint My Masterpiece" performed by Bob Dylan, War Memorial Coliseum, Plymouth, MA, October 31, 1975
- "Mississippi Blues" performed by Bob Dylan, Gas Station, Augusta, ME, November 25, 1975
- "Kaw-Liga" performed by Bob Dylan, Studio Instrumental Rentals, NYC, October 1975
- "Isis" performed by Bob Dylan, Montreal Forum, December 4, 1975
- "Ballad in Plain D" performed by Gordon Lightfoot, Studio Instrumental Rentals, NYC, October 1975
- "In the Pines" performed by Ronnie Hawkins
- "Theme song from Cabaret" anonymous performer
- "A Hard Rain's a-Gonna Fall" performed by Bob Dylan, Montreal Forum, December 4, 1975
- "Nurse's Song" performed by Allen Ginsberg, Gerdes Folk City, NYC, October 23, 1975
- "People Get Ready" performed by Bob Dylan, Studio Instrumental Rentals, NYC, October 1975
- "I Want You" performed by Bob Dylan, Studio Instrumental Rentals, NYC, October 1975
- "Need a New Sun Rising" performed by Ronee Blakley
- "Mama's Lament" performed by Mama Maria Frasca, Dreamaway Lounge, Becket, MA, November 7, 1975
- "God and Mama" performed by Mama Maria Frasca, Dreamaway Lounge, Becket, MA, November 7, 1975
- "Salt Pork, West Virginia" performed by Ramblin' Jack Elliot, Seacrest Motel, Falmouth, MA October 29, 1975
- "Mule Skinner Blues" performed by Ramblin' Jack Elliot, Seacrest Motel, Falmouth, MA October 29, 1975
- "A Yoga Song" improvised by Allen Ginsberg
- "What Will You Do When Jesus Comes" performed by Bob Dylan, Studio Instrumental Rentals, NYC, October 1975
- "Little Moses" performed by Bob Dylan, Studio Instrumental Rentals, NYC, October 1975
- "It Ain't Me Babe" performed by Bob Dylan, Harvard Square Theater, Cambridge, Massachusetts, November 20, 1975
- "Knockin' on Heaven's Door" performed by Bob Dylan, Clinton Correctional Facility, Clinton, NJ, December 7, 1975
- "Hurricane" performed by Bob Dylan, Studio Instrumental Rentals, NYC, October 1975
- "She Belongs to Me" performed by Bob Dylan, Studio Instrumental Rentals, NYC, October 1975
- "Catfish" performed by Rob Stoner
- "It Takes a Lot to Laugh, It Takes a Train to Cry" performed by Bob Dylan, Boston Music Hall, November 21, 1975 (evening show)
- "Longheno de Castro" performed by Ramblin' Jack Elliot, Gerdes Folk City, NYC, October 23, 1975
- "Diamonds & Rust" performed by Joan Baez
- "If You See Her, Say Hello" performed by Bob Dylan, Studio Instrumental Rentals, NYC, October 1975
- "Romance in Durango" performed by Bob Dylan, Montreal Forum, December 4, 1975
- "One Too Many Mornings" performed by Bob Dylan, Studio Instrumental Rentals, NYC, October 1975
- "The House of the Rising Sun" performed by Bob Dylan and Rob Stoner, Hotel Room, Quebec, November 28, 1975
- "One More Cup of Coffee" performed by Bob Dylan, Montreal Forum, December 4, 1975
- "Eight Miles High" performed by Roger McGuinn
- "Chestnut Mare" performed by Roger McGuinn
- "Sara" performed by Bob Dylan, Montreal Forum, December 4, 1975
- "The Water Is Wide" performed by Bob Dylan and Joan Baez, Palace Theater, Waterbury, CT, November 11, 1975
- "Patty’s Gone to Laredo" performed by Bob Dylan, Studio Instrumental Rentals, NYC, October 1975
- "Suzanne" performed by Joan Baez
- "Never Let Me Go" performed by Bob Dylan and Joan Baez, Montreal Forum, December 4, 1975
- "Sad Eyed Lady of the Lowlands" performed by Bob Dylan, Studio Instrumental Rentals, NYC, October 1975
- "Tangled Up in Blue" performed by Bob Dylan, Boston Music Hall, November 21, 1975 (evening show)
- "Just Like a Woman" performed by Bob Dylan, Harvard Square Theater, Cambridge, Massachusetts, November 20, 1975
- "Knockin' on Heaven's Door" performed by Bob Dylan, Harvard Square Theater, Cambridge, Massachusetts, November 20, 1975
- "In the Morning" performed by Hal Frazier, Seacrest Motel, Falmouth, MA, October 29, 1975

== See also ==
- The Bootleg Series Vol. 5: Bob Dylan Live 1975, The Rolling Thunder Revue (2002)
- Bob Dylan – The Rolling Thunder Revue: The 1975 Live Recordings (2019)
