= Joey (Bob Dylan song) =

1976 song by Bob Dylan

Song by Bob Dylan

from the album Desire
- Released: January 5, 1976
- Recorded: July 30, 1975 (basic track) August 11, 1975 (overdub session)
- Studio: Columbia Recording Studios, New York City
- Genre: Folk rock
- Length: 11:05
- Label: Columbia
- Songwriters: Bob Dylan; Jacques Levy
- Producer: Don DeVito

Desire track listing
- 9 tracks Side one: 1. "Hurricane"; 2. "Isis"; 3. "Mozambique"; 4. "One More Cup of Coffee (Valley Below)"; 5. "Oh, Sister"; Side two: 6. "Joey"; 7. "Romance in Durango"; 8. "Black Diamond Bay"; 9. "Sara"

"Joey" is an epic story-song from Bob Dylan's 1975 album Desire. It was written by Dylan and Jacques Levy, who collaborated with Dylan on most of the songs on the album. Like another long song on the album, "Hurricane", "Joey" is biographical. It tells the story of the life and death of mobster Joey Gallo, who was killed on his birthday at Umberto's Clam House in Little Italy, on April 7, 1972. The song was produced by Don DeVito.

== Background and composition ==
"Joey" treats its titular protagonist sympathetically, despite his violent history. Gallo had been accused of at least two murders and had been convicted of several felonies. But the song gives him credit for distrusting guns, being reluctant to kill hostages and shielding his family when he was being killed, and makes him appear to be an unwilling participant in the crimes of his henchmen, thus not deserving his fate. Besides his status as an outsider, Dylan was likely also drawn to Gallo's best friends in prison being black men. In addition Gallo was able to gain sympathy in artistic circles by passing himself off as a cultured person victimized by the "system".

The song has been described as including a demonstration of "the weak view of providence" in Dylan's songs, that is, a view that God usually allows humans to act as they want, but occasionally intervenes when a grave injustice has been done or a special plan needs to be carried out. In "Joey", this is demonstrated in the lines:

And someday if God's in heaven, overlookin' His preserve
I know the men that shot him down will get what they deserve.

In a 2009 interview with Bill Flanagan, Dylan claimed that Levy wrote all the words to this song. This, however, contradicts what Levy had told critic Lester Bangs at the time of Desire's release.

== Reception and legacy ==
As a result of Dylan's sympathetic treatment of Gallo, critics such as Lester Bangs harshly criticized the song upon its release. Bangs described it as "repellent romanticist bullshit". However, Dylan claims that he always thought of Gallo as a kind of hero and an underdog fighting against the elements.

The song's legacy remains mixed: a USA Today article ranking "all of Bob Dylan's songs" called it "forgettable" and lamented that it had replaced "Abandoned Love" on Desire's final track list but in a readers' poll conducted by Mojo, "Joey" was rated the 74th most popular Bob Dylan song of all time.

Jerry Garcia, who was responsible for getting Dylan to start performing it live in 1987, considered it a "great song" and Dylan himself characterized it as "Homeric" when discussing his Nobel Prize in Literature win with Edna Gundersen in 2016. Critic Paul Zollo, writing in American Songwriter magazine, called it a "beautifully detailed and cinematic" song and a "masterpiece" in 2021.

== Live performances ==
According to his official website, Dylan has played the song 82 times in concert between 1987 and 2012. It is the only song from Desire that he performed with any regularity after 1976. A live version from 1987 appears on the live album Dylan and the Dead.

== Notable covers ==
Italian-American outlaw musician Johnny Thunders recorded an abbreviated acoustic version on his album Hurt Me (1983). During their rise to popularity, Old Crow Medicine Show played the song often as part of encore sets. St. Louis garage-punk-blues band The Cripplers recorded a cover of Thunders' cover on their 2001 album One More for the Bad Guys.

The Brazilian singer Vitor Ramil has released a version named "Joquim" on his 1987 album Tango.
