= Love Minus Zero/No Limit =

1965 song by Bob Dylan

Song by Bob Dylan

from the album Bringing It All Back Home
- Released: March 22, 1965
- Recorded: January 14, 1965
- Studio: Columbia Recording, New York City
- Genre: Folk rock
- Length: 2:53
- Label: Columbia
- Songwriter: Bob Dylan
- Producer: Tom Wilson

Audio sample
- file; help

"Love Minus Zero/No Limit" (read "Love Minus Zero over No Limit", sometimes titled "Love Minus Zero") is a song written by Bob Dylan for his fifth studio album Bringing It All Back Home, released in 1965. Its main musical hook is a series of three descending chords, while its lyrics articulate Dylan's feelings for his lover, and have been interpreted as describing how she brings a needed zen-like calm to his chaotic world. The song uses surreal imagery, which some authors and critics have suggested recalls Edgar Allan Poe's "The Raven" and the biblical Book of Daniel. Critics have also remarked that the style of the lyrics is reminiscent of William Blake's poem "The Sick Rose".

Dylan has performed "Love Minus Zero/No Limit" live on several of his tours. Since its initial appearance on Bringing It All Back Home, live versions of the song have been released on a number of Dylan's albums, including Bob Dylan at Budokan, MTV Unplugged (European versions), and The Bootleg Series Vol. 5: Bob Dylan Live 1975, The Rolling Thunder Revue, as well as on the reissued Concert for Bangladesh album by George Harrison & Friends. Live video performances have been included on the Concert for Bangladesh and Other Side of the Mirror: Live at Newport Folk Festival 1963–1965 DVD releases.

Artists who have covered "Love Minus Zero/No Limit" include Ricky Nelson, Buck Owens, the Turtles, Joan Baez, Judy Collins, Fleetwood Mac, Rod Stewart, and Jackson Browne. Eric Clapton played it at Bob Dylan's 30th Anniversary Concert Celebration.

== Composition and recording ==
The version of the song that appears on Bringing It All Back Home was recorded on January 14, 1965, and was produced by Tom Wilson. This version was recorded by the full rock band that Dylan used to accompany him on the songs that appeared on side one of the album, and features a prominent electric guitar part played by Bruce Langhorne. However, like the other love song on side one, "She Belongs to Me", "Love Minus Zero/No Limit" had been recorded a day earlier in various acoustic configurations, and one of these takes was a strong contender to be included on the album. The January 13, 1965 recordings and a first take from January 14 were released on the 6-disc and 18-disc versions of The Bootleg Series Vol. 12: The Cutting Edge 1965–1966 in 2015. The initial title of the song was "Dime Store", in a reference to an included lyric; it was also briefly referred to as "(Tune Z) Dimestore" on the recording sheet.

Author and music critic Richie Unterberger has called the song, "one of the more tuneful and accessible tracks" on the album, with a prominent series of three descending diatonic chords providing the main hook. Critic Robert Shelton has described the music as soothing, so that the love expressed seems tranquil, even when images such as cloaks and daggers and trembling bridges are evoked by the lyrics. The tune and rhythm have a Latin feel and the lyrical rhyming pattern varies from verse to verse. For example, in the first verse, the first and second lines rhyme, the fourth and eighth lines rhyme, and the sixth and seventh lines rhyme, but the third and fifth lines are unrhymed. But in the second verse, the first three lines rhyme. Throughout the song, the rhymes are sometimes approximate; for example "another" is rhymed with "bother" and "trembles" is rhymed with "rambles."

== Interpretation ==
Some commentators, including Dylan biographer Clinton Heylin, have suggested that the lyrics reflect the Zen-like detachment of the singer's lover through a series of opposites, for example, that she "speaks like silence" and is both "like ice" and "like fire". Another famous line from the song that captures this dichotomy is, "She knows there's no success like failure, and that failure's no success at all."

The first verse of the song has the singer infatuated with a woman, admiring her inner strength. The three remaining verses reflect the inauthentic chaos that the singer has to deal with in the outside world, from which the lover's Zen-like calm provides needed refuge. Author Andy Gill has commented that the final image of the lover being like some raven at the singer's window with a broken wing recalls Edgar Allan Poe's "The Raven", but is also a symbol of the lover's vulnerability in spite of her strength. Author Anthony Varesi has remarked that the broken wing may also be a reference to the woman's need for shelter, or else to a flaw in her. According to Dylan critics Oliver Trager and Marcus Gray, the style of the song's lyrics are comparable to William Blake's poem "The Sick Rose" in their economy of language and use of a detached tone to express the narrator's intense emotional experience. Wilfrid Mellers has suggested that the song's surreal images anticipate the psychedelic songs Dylan would later write.

Author Seth Rogovoy, an expert on Jewish music, has pointed out that some of the song's images evoke prophecies from the Biblical Book of Daniel. For example, the line:

Statues made of matchsticks
Crumble into one another

is reminiscent of Daniel's prophecy that Nebuchadnezzar would build a statue of precious metals only to see it crumble like "chaff". Similarly, literary critic Christopher Ricks has noted that another line in the song states that people "Draw conclusions on the wall." Ricks writes that drawing conclusions on the wall rather than from the wall evokes the story from the Book of Daniel where a hand writes on a wall the words "MENE MENE TEKEL UPHARSIN," warning that the Neo-Babylonian Empire was about to end.

One interpretation that has been put forward by author John Hinchey regarding the identity of the lover in the song, as well as the one featured in "She Belongs to Me", is that she is Dylan's muse. Hinchey states that in each song the inaccessibility of the lover/muse can be interpreted as Dylan's acknowledgment of his own limitations—limitations that he attempts to overcome in writing the songs. In this interpretation, the final raven image sitting at the window can be viewed as a symbol of the muse's inaccessibility, and the raven's broken wing a symbol of its wildness. A related interpretation suggested by Shelton is that the song reflects an artist's "self-awareness through isolation." The line "She knows there's no success like failure, and that failure's no success at all" can be seen as a reflection of the isolation of the American writer.

The original title of the song was "Dime Store", which originates from the line "In the dime stores and bus stations..." The official title "Love Minus Zero/No Limit" is, according to Dylan, a fraction with "Love Minus Zero" on the top and "No Limit" on the bottom, and this is how the title appeared on early pressings of the Bringing It All Back Home LP. Therefore, the correct pronunciation of the song's title is "Love Minus Zero over No Limit". This has been interpreted by Trager as "absolutely unlimited love." Trager also noted that the title is based on gambling terminology which would mean that all love is a risk.

== Performances and recordings ==
Dylan has frequently performed the song in concert since the time it was written, nearly always acoustically. He performed it occasionally in concert during 1965 and 1966, but more frequently during the Rolling Thunder Revue tours from 1974 through 1976. Dylan also played it at The Concert for Bangladesh, during the first of the two August 1, 1971 benefit concerts organized by George Harrison and Ravi Shankar to help provide relief for refugees in Bangladesh. Dylan has also been playing the song live throughout the Never Ending Tour that began in 1988. Dylan has performed the song 365 times, with the most recent performance taking place in 2012.

In addition to its appearance on Bringing It All Back Home, "Love Minus Zero/No Limit" has been included on several Dylan live and compilation albums. In the 1970s, it was included on the compilation Masterpieces and on the live Bob Dylan at Budokan album, recorded in 1978. Other live performances have been included on Live 1962-1966: Rare Performances From The Copyright Collections (recorded in May 1965), the 2005 reissue of the Concert for Bangladesh album, The Bootleg Series Vol. 5: Bob Dylan Live 1975, The Rolling Thunder Revue (recorded December 1975; also released on The Rolling Thunder Revue: The 1975 Live Recordings), and the European versions of MTV Unplugged (recorded November 1994). Footage of Dylan playing the song is included on the 2005 DVD of the Concert for Bangladesh film and in The Other Side of the Mirror: Live at Newport Folk Festival 1963–1965, a film by Murray Lerner showing Dylan's performances at the Newport Folk Festival. A snippet from an impromptu performance of "Love Minus Zero/No Limit" is also included in the film Dont Look Back.

The song was also included on the Rhino/Starbucks compilation album This is Us: Songs from Where You Live.

== Cover versions ==
The song was covered several times in 1965, including a version by the Turtles on their album It Ain't Me Babe and a version by the Walker Brothers on their album Take It Easy with The Walker Brothers. Los Angeles band the Leaves covered the song on their 1966 album Hey Joe and Joan Baez included it on her 1968 album of Dylan covers, Any Day Now. Billboard described Baez's version as being "performed to perfection" and "one of her most commercial efforts to date". A version by singer/songwriter Turley Richards became a minor hit in 1970 (US number 84) and Australian number 96.

It was also covered in 1993 by Judy Collins on Judy Collins Sings Dylan... Just Like a Woman. Eric Clapton covered the song during Bob Dylan's 30th Anniversary Concert Celebration. Other musicians who have covered the song include Fleetwood Mac, Rod Stewart, Jackson Browne, Ricky Nelson, Buck Owens, Slaughter Beach, Dog, Doug Sahm, Bridget St. John, Eliza Gilkyson, Leon Russell, Les Fradkin, Willie Nile and Baby Gramps, Carolyn Hester.

== Legacy ==
In a 2005 reader's poll for Mojo magazine, "Love Minus Zero/No Limit" was listed as the #20 all-time greatest Bob Dylan song, and a similar poll of artists ranked the song #32. In 2002, Uncut magazine listed it as the #23 all-time greatest Bob Dylan song. Australian music critic Toby Creswell included the song in his book 1001 Songs: The Great Songs of All Time and the Artists, Stories and Secrets Behind Them.
