= Howard Wyeth =

American drummer and pianist (1944–1996)

Howard Pyle Wyeth
- Wyeth's album of ragtime and stride

Background information
- Born: April 22, 1944
- Origin: Jersey City, New Jersey, United States
- Died: March 27, 1996 (aged 51) Manhattan, New York, United States
- Genres: Rock, stride, ragtime, jazz, blues, zydeco
- Instruments: Drums, piano

Howard Pyle Wyeth (April 22, 1944 – March 27, 1996), also known as Howie Wyeth, was an American drummer and pianist. Wyeth is remembered for work with the saxophonist James Moody, the rockabilly singer Robert Gordon, the electric guitarist Link Wray, the rhythm and blues singer Don Covay, and the folk singer Christine Lavin. Best known as a drummer for Bob Dylan, he was a member of the Wyeth family of American artists.

== Family ==
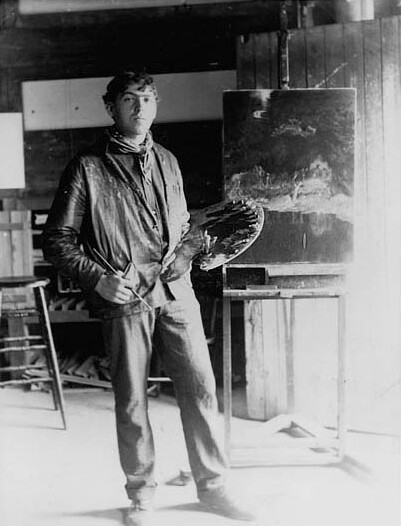
N. C. Wyeth (1882-1945), Wyeth's grandfather

Wyeth was born in Jersey City, New Jersey. His mother Caroline Pyle, Howard Pyle’s niece, was interested in the Wyeth family, flirted with some of them, and married Nathaniel C. Wyeth. He had four brothers, John, David, N. Convers, and Andrew, and one sister, Melinda who died very young. A fifth brother (the oldest), Newell died with his grandfather in 1945 when their car stalled on a railroad crossing near their home and they were struck by a milk train. Wyeth married once, to Rona Morrow, and later divorced. Catherine Wheeler was his partner for seventeen years, from his mid-thirties on.

The Wyeths are a family of visual artists and, earlier, illustrators who lived and worked together in Chadds Ford, Pennsylvania. Including the Hurds and the McCoys, at least eleven artists are among the family and in-laws. Wyeth was the namesake of his great-uncle Howard Pyle (1853–1911), the artist and illustrator for Harper's Weekly and the author of The Merry Adventures of Robin Hood and four volumes of children's stories about King Arthur. His grandfather N. C. Wyeth was a student of Howard Pyle and a prominent illustrator of children's books for Charles Scribner's Sons. His grandmother Ellen Bernard Thompson Pyle was an illustrator of children for The Saturday Evening Post who married Walter Pyle, Howard's younger brother. He was the nephew of the painters Andrew Wyeth, Henriette Wyeth and Carolyn Wyeth.

== Early years ==
Wyeth was the son of music lovers—his father enjoyed playing ragtime. He learned drums by age 4 and soon on a piano could repeat songs he had heard. He attended the Wilmington Friends School where his music teacher helped him decide to be a musician. Fats Waller was Wyeth's greatest influence, leading him to learn stride piano and music theory. He studied percussion with Alan Abel of the Philadelphia Orchestra, and received a bachelor's in music at Syracuse University in 1966.

In 1972 on a solo album by John Herald co-produced by Bob Neuwirth for Paramount, Wyeth played with Amos Garret, Steven Soles, Ned Albright and Rob Stoner.

== Desire ==
The World of John Hammond, Chicago 1975

"Hurricane" from Bob Dylan's Desire, 1976. Luther Rix on congas.
30 second sample (reduced quality)

The songs were co-written with Jacques Levy, and the personnel were Dylan (vocals, guitar, harmonica, piano), Vinnie Bell (bouzouki), Scarlet Rivera (violin), Dom Cortese (accordion), Stoner (bass, background vocals), Wyeth (drums), Luther Rix (congas), and Emmylou Harris, Ronee Blakley and Soles (background vocals). In September 1975, a few months before the album release in January, Dylan, with Rivera on violin, Stoner on bass and Wyeth on drums (who played left-handed) performed Hurricane, Oh, Sister and Simple Twist of Fate for the PBS tribute to John Hammond recorded at the WTTW television studios in Chicago.

The group found themselves with a Billboard No. 1 pop album, the last Dylan effort to reach that mark for thirty years until 2006 when he released Modern Times. Robert Christgau who distrusted the project thought the song "Joey" was "deceitful bathos," and Dave Marsh called "Joey" "elitist sophistry" and "contemptible," but Rolling Stone counted Desire the 174th greatest album of all time. Desire eventually reached RIAA multi-platinum, selling over two million copies before its re-release in 2003.

The project is remembered for its "loose and swirling" sound and the songs "Hurricane", "Isis", "One More Cup of Coffee (Valley Below)", "Oh, Sister", "Black Diamond Bay" and "Sara". Sony credited Wyeth as an accompanist with an "uncannily sympathetic ear." Larry Sloman called his drumming "ethereal." Billboard said Stoner and Wyeth were one of the strongest rhythm sections in music.

== Rolling Thunder Revue ==
Dylan, Levy and Neuwirth conceived the Rolling Thunder Revue in New York in 1975. The revue toured the United States during the end of 1975 and first half of 1976, and at two of those shows recorded the live album Hard Rain released in 1976. They are the musical performers in the Hard Rain documentary by TVTV shown on NBC in 1976, and in the film Renaldo and Clara released in 1978. About one hundred people traveled including supporting personnel. The recording artists were Dylan and Joan Baez (vocal & guitar), Blakley (vocal), Gary Burke (drums), T-Bone Burnett (guitar), David Mansfield (steel-guitar, mandolin, violin, dobro), Roger McGuinn (guitar, vocal), Neuwirth (guitar, vocal), Rivera (violin), Rix (drums, percussion, congas), Mick Ronson (guitar), Soles (guitar, vocal), Stoner (bass) and Wyeth (piano, drums).

Joni Mitchell, who flew in to sing for one show, nearly left, but when she told Wyeth goodbye, he was hurt, "And I suddenly realized, more than anybody Wyeth's reaction was so heartfelt, his expression of it was so open. Like it's just his soul is so beautiful. And I stayed."

Isaac Hayes, Richie Havens, Carlos Santana, Ringo Starr, Stephen Stills and Stevie Wonder joined the band, who named themselves Guam, for a show in Houston. With bad acoustics and the Astrodome only half full it was a "monumental flop." According to Wyeth the newcomers brought their own bands, "They weren't doing it the way we'd been doing it. We lost the whole togetherness thing."

In pouring rain, the Hard Rain recordings for television and most of the live album were made outdoors at Colorado State University's Hughes Stadium in 1976 at Fort Collins, Colorado. The show was "triumphant" and well received, one reviewer calling "Idiot Wind" the "most passionate and emotional live performance" Dylan had ever made. Stoner said, "everybody is playing and singing for their lives, and that is the spirit that you hear on that record." Due to low ticket sales, the Rolling Thunder Revue ended two days later in Salt Lake, Wyeth's final concert with Dylan and this band.

== Later years ==
McGuinn loved the tour and turned to the studio with Mansfield, Ronson, Stoner and Wyeth to record Cardiff Rose. Burke, Burnett, McGuinn, Ronson, Soles and Wyeth are among the cast of thirty five musicians who recorded Lasso from El Paso for Kinky Friedman who was a guest artist in the revue. Sony continues to release Dylan's music so the Rolling Thunder Revue artists are credited long after they disbanded. Their work is in Masterpieces (1978), The Bootleg Series Volumes 1-3 (Rare & Unreleased) 1961-1991 (1991), Bob Dylan's Greatest Hits Volume 3 (1994), Best of Bob Dylan (1997), Bob Dylan Live 1975 (The Bootleg Series Volume 5) (2002), and Desire (remastered 2003). Wyeth recorded four albums with Gordon, as well as albums with Don McLean, Leslie West and Moody. He is the drummer on Lavin's Attainable Love released by Philo in 1990 and the pianist on "Warmer Days", a song written by John Popper on the 1990 A&M album Blues Traveler. Later he led his own groups on piano, playing ragtime, blues and early jazz.

"Ain't She Sweet" from a medley on Howie Wyeth's "Chadds Ford Getaway", 2003
30 second sample (reduced quality)

Chadds Ford Getaway was Wyeth's one solo recording of ragtime and stride piano. It was remastered by Greg Calbi at Sterling Sound and released as a two-CD set in 2003 by Stand Clear Music. Among the fifteen medleys are lesser-known works alongside "Ain't Misbehavin'", made famous by Fats Waller, and Scott Joplin's "Maple Leaf Rag".

Mansfield and Wyeth played on Chris Harford's Elektra album Be Headed in 1992 with a host of others. After Wyeth's death, Harford released a piano instrumental Ode to Howie Wyeth.

Also that year, Wyeth played drums on Fishermen's Stew's 7" single release of "Small Life, Hollow Roads, and Fairy Tales" b/w "Fine" released on Berlin's Twang! Records in 1993.

== Death ==
Wyeth died of cardiac arrest at St. Vincent's Hospital in Manhattan on March 27, 1996. He was 51.
