= Rolling Thunder Revue: A Bob Dylan Story by Martin Scorsese =

2019 film directed by Martin Scorsese

- Promotional release poster
- Directed by: Martin Scorsese
- Produced by: Margaret Bodde; Jeff Rosen
- Starring: Bob Dylan
- Cinematography: Paul Goldsmith; Ellen Kuras
- Edited by: Damian Rodriguez; David Tedeschi
- Production companies: Grey Water Park Productions; Sikelia Productions
- Distributed by: Netflix
- Release date: June 12, 2019
- Running time: 142 minutes
- Country: United States
- Language: English

Rolling Thunder Revue: A Bob Dylan Story by Martin Scorsese (or Conjuring the Rolling Thunder Re-vue: A Bob Dylan Story by Martin Scorsese, according to the main title graphic) is a 2019 American documentary film, composed of both fictional and non-fictional material, covering Bob Dylan's 1975 Rolling Thunder Revue concert tour. It is Martin Scorsese's second film on Dylan, following No Direction Home (2005). The bulk of Rolling Thunder Revue is compiled of outtakes from Dylan's film Renaldo and Clara (1978), which was filmed in conjunction with the tour.

The film features contemporary interviews with prominent figures of the tour such as Dylan, Joan Baez, Sam Shepard, Ronee Blakley, Ramblin' Jack Elliott, Roger McGuinn, Ronnie Hawkins, Larry Sloman, Rubin "Hurricane" Carter, as well as archival interviews with Scarlet Rivera and Allen Ginsberg. It also features fictional interviews of actors portraying characters who were not actually involved in the tour, including Martin Von Haselberg portraying the fictional filmmaker Stefan Van Dorp, Sharon Stone playing a fictionalized version of herself, and Michael Murphy reprising his role as the U.S. congressman and dark horse Democratic presidential candidate Jack Tanner from Robert Altman's mockumentary miniseries Tanner '88 (1988) and its sequel, Tanner on Tanner (2004). Rolling Thunder Revue does not differentiate between the fictional and factual accounts, and even Dylan himself refers to the fictional characters in his interviews, leaving the audience to guess which parts of the film are authentic and which are fabricated.

== Plot ==
The film opens with a modern-day Dylan admitting he does not remember anything about the Rolling Thunder Revue, saying it happened so long ago "I wasn't even born!" He finds it impossible to get to the "core" of what it was all about because "it's about nothing."

As the United States Bicentennial fast approaches, and with the spirit of America particularly bleak after the country's unceremonious exit from Vietnam and the Watergate scandal, Dylan decides to gather together a group of his friends from the Greenwich Village folk scene and go on an adventurous tour across New England and parts of Canada. Dubbed the "Rolling Thunder Revue", the tour is documented by European filmmaker Stefan Van Dorp (Martin von Haselberg).

Along the way, Larry 'Ratso' Sloman, a reporter sent by Rolling Stone to write about the tour, tries to ingratiate himself into Dylan's inner circle. A young Sharon Stone is put in charge of costumes after being taken to a show by her mother and becomes convinced the song "Just Like a Woman" was written for her. Dylan starts to wear Whiteface makeup onstage after violinist Scarlet Rivera takes him to see a Kiss concert. Poet Allen Ginsberg tries to refashion himself as a singer/songwriter as beat poetry falls out of popular favor. Joan Baez attempts to rekindle her romance with Dylan by singing with him onstage and dressing up in his stage outfit; Dylan visits a Tuscarora Reservation in New York and performs a rendition of Peter LaFarge's "The Ballad of Ira Hayes". Joni Mitchell joins the tour midway through and writes the song "Coyote" about the experience.

During the tour, Dylan takes time to pay an unscheduled visit to record company executives to ensure rapid release of his new song "Hurricane", the musician's contribution to efforts to exonerate Rubin "Hurricane" Carter, a celebrated boxer wrongfully convicted of murder.

Documentary footage of the meeting is followed by a scene in which U.S. Congressman Jack Tanner (Michael Murphy), recalls persuading President Jimmy Carter to intervene on the boxer's behalf. Carter got Tanner tickets to the Revue. The campaign by Dylan and others would eventually lead to the retrial and release of Carter.

The tour comes to a stop in Montreal. Van Dorp states the only reason he agreed to be interviewed for this documentary was to stake his claim over the footage from the tour which makes up the bulk of the film. Ginsberg encourages the viewer to follow the example of the performers they have witnessed and go on their own journeys of self-discovery. Dylan continues to tour after the Rolling Thunder Revue, playing over 3,000 shows over the course of 40 years.

== Cast ==
The interviewees in the film are given character names in the end credits. Some of the people interviewed were part of the Rolling Thunder Revue, some were not, and some are entirely fictional.

- Bob Dylan as himself
- Allen Ginsberg as The Oracle of Delphi
- Patti Smith as The Punk Poet
- Martin Von Haselberg as The Filmmaker. Haselberg plays Stefan Van Dorp, a European filmmaker who claims to have directed the original footage of the tour for a movie he was making about the spirit of America in the '70s. In reality, the tour footage was directed by Dylan himself for the 1978 film Renaldo and Clara.
- Scarlet Rivera as The Queen of Swords
- Joan Baez as The Balladeer
- Roger McGuinn as The Minstrel
- Larry "Ratso" Sloman as The Rolling Stone Reporter
- Jim Gianopulos as The Promoter. The story depicts Gianopulos as the promoter of the Rolling Thunder Revue tour, when in reality he was attending law school during the period of time this film is set in.
- Ramblin' Jack Elliott as The Sailor
- Sam Shepard as The Writer
- David Mansfield as The Innocent
- Sharon Stone as The Beauty Queen. Stone claims to have joined up with the tour at the age of 19, helping with the stage costumes, having a brief flirtation with Dylan, and proclaiming that one day she would be a famous movie star. In reality, Stone was 17 when the Rolling Thunder Revue went on tour and she never crossed paths with Dylan or any of his associates. The photos of them together are digital fabrications.
- Ronnie Hawkins as The Shitkicker
- Anne Waldman as The Word Worker
- Ronee Blakley as The Ingénue
- Joni Mitchell as The Artist
- Chief Rolling Thunder as The Medicine Man. Despite the tour being named after him, he was not part of the Rolling Thunder Revue. He appears only in unrelated interview footage.
- Peter La Farge as The Cowboy Indian. Not part of the Rolling Thunder Revue. Appears only in unrelated archive footage.
- Michael Murphy as The Politician. Murphy reprises his role as former U.S. Congressman Jack Tanner from the HBO miniseries, Tanner '88, and its Sundance Channel sequel, Tanner on Tanner; in the latter production, Murphy appeared, briefly, opposite Scorsese (cameoing as himself).
- Rubin "Hurricane" Carter as The Boxer
- Chief Mad Bear as The Chief

== Production ==
The project came from Dylan's manager, Jeff Rosen, who approached Scorsese with some of the tour's footage shortly after the completion of No Direction Home. The director instantly agreed to do it but was busy with other films at the time. The bulk of the work was done while he was finishing Silence. Once again, Rosen took charge of the interviews and gave them to Scorsese.

== Release ==
The film was released by Netflix on June 12, 2019. Columbia Records also released a box-set album entitled Bob Dylan – The Rolling Thunder Revue: The 1975 Live Recordings to correspond with the release.

=== Home media ===
Rolling Thunder Revue: A Bob Dylan Story by Martin Scorsese received director-approved special edition DVD and Blu-ray releases by The Criterion Collection on January 19, 2021.

== Critical response ==
Manohla Dargis of The New York Times says Rolling Thunder Revue: A Bob Dylan Story by Martin Scorsese is "at once a celebration and a rescue mission (it draws heavily on restored film footage), as well as another chapter in Scorsese's decades-long chronicling of Dylan." It was also picked as one of the "Best Films of 2019 (so far)", by The New York Times.

The film received an aggregate score of 86 on critical website Metacritic, indicating "universal acclaim". The film has a 93% freshness rating at Rotten Tomatoes as of February 2022.

== See also ==
- The Bootleg Series Vol. 5: Bob Dylan Live 1975, The Rolling Thunder Revue (2002)
