= Black Diamond Bay (song) =

Song by Bob Dylan

from the album Desire
- Released: January 5, 1976
- Recorded: July 30, 1975
- Length: 7:30
- Label: Columbia
- Songwriters: Bob Dylan; Jacques Levy
- Producer: Don DeVito

"Black Diamond Bay" is a song by American singer-songwriter Bob Dylan. It was released on January 5, 1976, as the eighth track on his seventeenth studio album Desire. Like much of the album, the song was co-written by Dylan with Jacques Levy.

== Background ==
Recording of "Black Diamond Bay" commenced on July 29, 1975, with twelve takes being recorded. These initial takes utilized an expanded list of instrumentation including mandolin and trumpet. The next day saw five more takes performed with a stripped-down lineup, resulting in the final version selected for the album.

The song's lyrics depict a list of characters including a woman with a Panama hat, a suicidal Greek man, a soldier, and an unsuccessful gambler, all located on the titular island during an oncoming natural disaster. As the characters partake in their exploits, a volcano on the island eventually erupts, resulting in their deaths and the destruction of the island. The final verse of the song reveals the narrator to be an outside observer, having only learned about the disaster from a news broadcast. The work of author Joseph Conrad was a mutual inspiration for both Dylan and Levy; some have singled out Conrad's novel Victory (1915) in particular as an influence on the track.

== Reception ==
"Black Diamond Bay" has received positive reviews from critics. In a retrospective review of Desire, Pitchfork writer Elizabeth Nelson called the track "remarkably tuneful, ruefully ominous, and utterly batshit." Nelson highlights the song's lyrical imagery as well as the performances of the band members, particularly bassist Rob Stoner. Rolling Stone included the song on their list of "20 Overlooked Bob Dylan Classics", with writer Rob Sheffield describing it as a "tale of forbidden love, violence, [and] treachery".

== Live performance ==
Dylan reportedly performed the song on May 25, 1976 in Salt Lake City, which was the final show of the Rolling Thunder Revue tour. No recording of the show has surfaced, and the only proof that "Black Diamond Bay" was performed was a listing in a Fanzine, leading fans to theorize it may have been a misidentification of another Desire track, Romance in Durango.
