= Hurricane (Bob Dylan song) =

1976 song by Bob Dylan

Single by Bob Dylan

from the album Desire
- B-side: "Hurricane (Part II)"
- Released: November 21, 1975
- Recorded: July 1975 and October 24, 1975
- Studio: Columbia Studios, New York City
- Genre: Folk rock; protest song
- Length: 3:45 (Part I); 4:57 (Part II); 8:33 (Album version)
- Label: Columbia
- Songwriters: Bob Dylan; Jacques Levy
- Producer: Don DeVito

Bob Dylan singles chronology
"Million Dollar Bash" / "Tears of Rage" (1975)	"Hurricane" (1975)	"Mozambique" (1976)

Desire track listing
- 9 tracks Side one: 1. "Hurricane"; 2. "Isis"; 3. "Mozambique"; 4. "One More Cup of Coffee (Valley Below)"; 5. "Oh, Sister"; Side two: 6. "Joey"; 7. "Romance in Durango"; 8. "Black Diamond Bay"; 9. "Sara"

Official audio
- "Hurricane" on YouTube

"Hurricane" is a protest song by Bob Dylan co-written with Jacques Levy and released as a single in November 1975. It was also included on Dylan's 1976 album Desire as its opening track. The song is about the imprisonment of boxer Rubin "Hurricane" Carter (1937–2014). It describes acts of racism and profiling against Carter, which led to a flawed trial and a murder conviction that was eventually overturned.

== Background ==
Carter and John Artis had been charged with a triple murder at the Lafayette Grill in Paterson, New Jersey, in 1966. The following year Carter and Artis were found guilty of the murders, which were widely reported as racially motivated. In the years that followed, a substantial amount of controversy emerged over the case, ranging from allegations of faulty evidence and questionable eyewitness testimony to an unfair trial.

In his autobiography, Carter maintained his innocence and, after reading it, Dylan visited him in Rahway State Prison in Woodbridge Township, New Jersey.

Of writing the song, author Clinton Heylin wrote that "Dylan had written topical ballads such as 'The Lonesome Death of Hattie Carroll' and Bob wasn't sure that he could write a song [about Carter]... He was just filled with all these feelings about Hurricane. He couldn't make the first step. I think the first step was putting the song in a total storytelling mode. I don't remember whose idea it was to do that. But really, the beginning of the song is like stage directions, like what you would read in a script: 'Pistol shots ring out in a barroom night.... Here comes the story of the Hurricane.' Boom! Titles. You know, Bob loves movies, and he can write these movies that take place in eight to ten minutes, yet seem as full or fuller than regular movies".

After meeting with Carter in prison and later with a group of his supporters, Dylan began to write "Hurricane". The song was one of his few "protest songs" during the 1970s and proved to be his fourth most successful single of the decade, reaching No. 33 on the Billboard Hot 100. Billboard declared that it was "probably the most powerful song Dylan has recorded in a decade, combining the 'sensible hate' he showed in 'Masters of War' with a perfect expression of the kind of injustice heard in 'The Lonesome Death of Hattie Carroll.'" Record World said that "The story is true and the names haven't been changed to protect the innocent."

== Controversy and re-recording ==
Dylan first recorded the song in late July 1975; it featured Scarlet Rivera on violin and Vinnie Bell on Danelectro Bellzouki 12-string guitar. Dylan was forced to re-record the song, with altered lyrics, in October 1975 after concerns were raised by Columbia's lawyers that references to Alfred Bello and Arthur Dexter Bradley (the two star witnesses of the case) as having "robbed the bodies" could result in a lawsuit. Bello and Bradley had never been accused of such acts. Because there was too much leakage on the multitracks to make a vocal "punch in", Dylan decided to re-record the entire song. At this time, he was already rehearsing for his upcoming tour, and the musicians from the Rolling Thunder Revue were still at his disposal. Dylan took violinist Rivera, guitarist Steven Soles, bassist Rob Rothstein, drummer Howie Wyeth, and percussionist Luther Rix back into the studio, and a new, faster version of "Hurricane" was recorded with Don DeVito again producing, and Ronee Blakley providing a harmony vocal. The final version of the song, which runs over eight minutes, was spliced together from two separate takes completed on October 24, 1975.

Even though some offending lyrics were removed, the song still drew legal action from eyewitness Patricia Graham (Patty) Valentine, who believed that it portrayed her as part of a conspiracy to frame Carter. However, her lawsuit was dismissed by a federal district court, and the United States Court of Appeals for the Eleventh Circuit affirmed the dismissal. Dylan biographer Howard Sounes praised the song but noted "there was no reference to [Carter's] antagonistic rhetoric, criminal history, or violent temper".

== Benefit concert and new trial ==
The song was released on the album Desire in January 1976, making the Carter case known to a broader public. "Hurricane" is credited with harnessing popular support to Carter's defense.

During the fall tour preceding Desire's release, Dylan and the Rolling Thunder Revue played a benefit concert for Carter in New York City's Madison Square Garden, raising $100,000. The following year, they played another benefit at the Houston Astrodome. Dylan met with managers Richard Flanzer and Roy Silver, who provided Stevie Wonder, Ringo Starr and Dr. John for the concert. After expenses were paid, however, the Houston event failed to raise any money.

Despite winning the right to a new trial, Carter and Artis were once again found guilty when the prosecution argued that the defendants committed a triple murder at the Lafayette Grill in revenge for the killing of an African-American tavern owner earlier during the same night. In 1976, Carter was sentenced to two consecutive life terms. Dylan, and the other high-profile supporters, did not attend the trial. Artis was paroled five years later.

In 1985 Federal Judge H. Lee Sarokin of the United States District Court for the District of New Jersey, who declined to hear the song when it was offered to him by his family, ruled that Carter had not received a fair trial and overturned the conviction, resulting in Carter's release and the granting of a writ of habeas corpus to Carter, commenting that the prosecution had been "based on racism rather than reason and concealment rather than disclosure". In 1988, after the prosecution said they would not seek a third trial and filed a motion to dismiss, following their failed appeal to the Supreme Court which declined to hear the case and upheld Sarokin's ruling, a Superior Court judge dropped all the charges against Carter and Artis.

== Charts and certifications ==
Weekly charts
Chart (1975–76)	Peak position
Australia (Kent Music Report)	7
Canada Top Singles (RPM)	26
New Zealand	25
UK Singles Chart	43
US Billboard Hot 100	33
US Cashbox top 100	27

Region	Certification	Certified units/sales
Australia (ARIA)	Gold	35,000^{^}
Italy (FIMI)	Gold	15,000^{‡}
New Zealand (RMNZ)	Platinum	30,000^{‡}
Spain (Promusicae)	Gold	30,000^{‡}
United Kingdom (BPI)	Silver	200,000^{‡}
United States (RIAA)	Platinum	1,000,000^{‡}
^{^} Shipments figures based on certification alone.^{‡} Sales+streaming figures based on certification alone.

== Cover versions ==
The song has been covered by Ani DiFranco, Furthur, Middle Class Rut, the Milltown Brothers, and Iain Lee when he sang it on his Late Night Alternative phone-in show on Talkradio in January 2018.

In the season three premiere of the Showtime TV series Our Cartoon President, the song was parodied as a proclamation of Donald Trump's innocence during the 2020 impeachment trial of Donald Trump. The parody was performed by cartoon versions of Fox & Friends hosts Steve Doocy (on harmonica and acoustic guitar, a reference to Dylan's most commonly played instruments), Ainsley Earhardt (on cello), and Brian Kilmeade (on violin).
