= Bob Dylan – The Rolling Thunder Revue: The 1975 Live Recordings =

Live album box set by Bob Dylan
- Released: June 7, 2019
- Recorded: 1975
- Venue: Various venues
- Genre: Folk rock
- Length: 632:08
- Label: Columbia; Legacy

Bob Dylan chronology
The Bootleg Series Vol. 14: More Blood, More Tracks (2018)	Bob Dylan – The Rolling Thunder Revue: The 1975 Live Recordings (2019)	The Bootleg Series Vol. 15: Travelin' Thru, 1967–1969 (2019)

Bob Dylan – The Rolling Thunder Revue: The 1975 Live Recordings is a box set of 1975 live recordings by Bob Dylan, released on June 7, 2019. For this tour, Dylan assembled a loose collective of a backing band called Guam and played across North America for several dozen shows. The tie-in Netflix documentary film Rolling Thunder Revue: A Bob Dylan Story by Martin Scorsese was released the following week. A similar compilation was released in 2002 entitled Bob Dylan Live 1975, The Rolling Thunder Revue, as part of Dylan's ongoing Bootleg Series. That compilation was re-released on vinyl as a companion to the later release.

== Critical reception ==
Editors of AllMusic gave the album four out of five stars, with Thom Jurek's review highlighting the quality of the packaging and recording as well as the diversity of the arrangement of songs from night to night, and the rarities, summing up, "it's immeasurably valuable for the way it illuminates a wildly spontaneous period in the songwriter's career". Rolling Stone's David Fricke also gave the compilation four out of five stars, highlighting the track "Isis" and how it evolves through the performances to display Dylan's musical versatility and the chaos in his personal life.

== Track listing ==
The album was released on compact disc as well as a digital download. Discs refer to divisions in the physical release.

All tracks are written by Bob Dylan, except where noted.

Disc 1 – S.I.R. Rehearsals, New York, NY – October 19, 1975
No.	Title	Writer(s)	Note	Length
1.	"Rake and Ramblin’ Boy" (incomplete)	traditional, arranged by Bob Dylan	included in Rolling Thunder Revue: A Bob Dylan Story by Martin Scorsese (2019 film)	1:50
2.	"Romance in Durango" (incomplete)	Bob Dylan, Jacques Levy	included in Rolling Thunder Revue: A Bob Dylan Story by Martin Scorsese	5:24
3.	"Rita May"	Bob Dylan, Jacques Levy	included in Rolling Thunder Revue: A Bob Dylan Story by Martin Scorsese	3:22
4.	"I Want You" (incomplete)		included in the film Renaldo and Clara (1978 film)	2:18
5.	"Love Minus Zero/No Limit" (incomplete)		included in Rolling Thunder Revue: A Bob Dylan Story by Martin Scorsese	1:12
6.	"She Belongs to Me" (incomplete)		included in Rolling Thunder Revue: A Bob Dylan Story by Martin Scorsese	2:41
7.	"Joey" (incomplete)	Bob Dylan, Jacques Levy		5:13
8.	"Isis"	Bob Dylan, Jacques Levy		7:45
9.	"Hollywood Angel" (incomplete)			2:51
10.	"People Get Ready"	Curtis Mayfield	included in the film Renaldo and Clara released on 4 Songs from Renaldo and Clara (1978 album)	2:42
11.	"What Will You Do When Jesus Comes?"		included in the film Renaldo and Clara	1:37
12.	"Spanish Is the Loving Tongue"			4:05
13.	"The Ballad of Ira Hayes"	Peter LaFarge		2:55
14.	"One More Cup of Coffee (Valley Below)"		included in Rolling Thunder Revue: A Bob Dylan Story by Martin Scorsese	3:40
15.	"Tonight I’ll Be Staying Here with You"			2:58
16.	"This Land Is Your Land"	Woody Guthrie		2:32
17.	"Dark as a Dungeon"	Merle Travis	included in Rolling Thunder Revue: A Bob Dylan Story by Martin Scorsese	3:42
Total length:				56:47

Disc 2 – S.I.R. Rehearsals, New York, NY – October 21, 1975
No.	Title	Writer(s)	Note	Length
1.	"She Belongs to Me"		included in the film Renaldo and Clara	2:39
2.	"A Hard Rain’s A-Gonna Fall"			4:02
3.	"Isis"	Bob Dylan, Jacques Levy		3:57
4.	"This Wheel’s on Fire/Hurricane/All Along the Watchtower"	"This Wheel's on Fire" by Bob Dylan, Rick Danko / "Hurricane" by Bob Dylan, Jacques Levy		13:28
5.	"One More Cup Of Coffee (Valley Below)"			3:15
6.	"If You See Her, Say Hello"			2:56
7.	"One Too Many Mornings"		included in the film Renaldo and Clara	2:31
8.	"Gwenevere" (incomplete)			2:20
9.	"Lily, Rosemary and the Jack of Hearts" (incomplete)			2:21
10.	"Patty’s Gone to Laredo"		included in the film Renaldo and Clara	2:47
11.	"It’s Alright, Ma (I’m Only Bleeding)"			0:52
Total length:				41:08

Disc 3 – Seacrest Motel Rehearsals, Falmouth, MA – October 29, 1975
No.	Title	Writer(s)	Length
1.	"Tears of Rage"	Bob Dylan, Richard Manuel	3:32
2.	"I Shall Be Released"		4:11
3.	"Easy and Slow"	traditional	5:22
4.	"Ballad of a Thin Man"		5:42
5.	"Hurricane"	Bob Dylan, Jacques Levy	8:22
6.	"One More Cup of Coffee (Valley Below)"		4:16
7.	"Just Like a Woman"		5:14
8.	"Knockin’ on Heaven’s Door"		4:30
Total length:			41:09

Disc 4–5 – Memorial Auditorium, Worcester, MA – November 19, 1975
No.	Title	Writer(s)	Note	Length
1.	"When I Paint My Masterpiece"			4:38
2.	"It Ain’t Me, Babe"			5:27
3.	"The Lonesome Death of Hattie Carroll"			5:13
4.	"It Takes a Lot to Laugh, It Takes a Train to Cry"			3:19
5.	"Romance in Durango"	Bob Dylan, Jacques Levy		5:26
6.	"Isis"	Bob Dylan, Jacques Levy		5:29
7.	"Blowin' in the Wind"			2:51
8.	"Wild Mountain Thyme"	Francis McPeake		3:58
9.	"Mama, You Been on My Mind"			2:43
10.	"Dark as a Dungeon"	Merle Travis		3:32
11.	"I Shall Be Released"			4:23
12.	"Tangled Up in Blue"			4:48
13.	"Oh, Sister"	Bob Dylan, Jacques Levy		3:59
14.	"Hurricane"	Bob Dylan, Jacques Levy	released on The Bootleg Series, Vol. 5: Bob Dylan Live 1975 (2002 album) included in Rolling Thunder Revue: A Bob Dylan Story by Martin Scorsese	8:20
15.	"One More Cup of Coffee (Valley Below)"			3:50
16.	"Sara"			4:44
17.	"Just Like a Woman"			4:17
18.	"Knockin’ on Heaven’s Door"			4:51
19.	"This Land Is Your Land"	Woody Guthrie		4:00
Total length:				85:48

Disc 6–7 – Harvard Square Theater, Cambridge, MA – November 20, 1975
No.	Title	Writer(s)	Note	Length
1.	"When I Paint My Masterpiece"			4:23
2.	"It Ain’t Me, Babe"		included in the film Renaldo and Clara released on 4 Songs from Renaldo and Clara released on The Bootleg Series, Vol. 5: Bob Dylan Live 1975	5:20
3.	"The Lonesome Death of Hattie Carroll"			5:23
4.	"It Takes a Lot to Laugh, It Takes a Train to Cry*"		included in Rolling Thunder Revue: A Bob Dylan Story by Martin Scorsese	3:26
5.	"Romance in Durango"	Bob Dylan, Jacques Levy	released on The Bootleg Series, Vol. 5: Bob Dylan Live 1975 included in Rolling Thunder Revue: A Bob Dylan Story by Martin Scorsese	5:15
6.	"Isis"	Bob Dylan, Jacques Levy		5:27
7.	"Blowin' in the Wind"		included in Rolling Thunder Revue: A Bob Dylan Story by Martin Scorsese	2:37
8.	"Wild Mountain Thyme"	Francis McPeake		4:06
9.	"Mama, You Been on My Mind"		released on The Bootleg Series, Vol. 5: Bob Dylan Live 1975	3:02
10.	"Dark as a Dungeon"	Merle Travis		3:30
11.	"I Shall Be Released"			4:15
12.	"Simple Twist of Fate"		released on The Bootleg Series, Vol. 5: Bob Dylan Live 1975 included in Rolling Thunder Revue: A Bob Dylan Story by Martin Scorsese	4:39
13.	"Oh, Sister"	Bob Dylan, Jacques Levy		3:41
14.	"Hurricane"	Bob Dylan, Jacques Levy		8:19
15.	"One More Cup of Coffee (Valley Below)"			3:55
16.	"Sara"			5:09
17.	"Just Like a Woman"		included in the film Renaldo and Clara	4:12
18.	"Knockin’ on Heaven’s Door"		included in the film Renaldo and Clara released on The Bootleg Series, Vol. 5: Bob Dylan Live 1975	4:03
19.	"This Land Is Your Land"	Woody Guthrie		4:05
Total length:				84:47

Disc 8–9 – Boston Music Hall, Boston, MA – November 21, 1975 (afternoon)
No.	Title	Writer(s)	Note	Length
1.	"When I Paint My Masterpiece"			4:16
2.	"It Ain’t Me, Babe"			5:14
3.	"The Lonesome Death of Hattie Carroll"			5:17
4.	"A Hard Rain’s A-Gonna Fall"			5:25
5.	"Romance in Durango"	Bob Dylan, Jacques Levy		4:36
6.	"Isis"	Bob Dylan, Jacques Levy	released on The Bootleg Series, Vol. 5: Bob Dylan Live 1975 included in Rolling Thunder Revue: A Bob Dylan Story by Martin Scorsese	5:50
7.	"The Times They Are A-Changin'"			2:45
8.	"I Dreamed I Saw St. Augustine"			3:03
9.	"Mama, You Been on My Mind"			2:50
10.	"Never Let Me Go"	Joseph Scott		2:37
11.	"I Shall Be Released^"		included in Rolling Thunder Revue: A Bob Dylan Story by Martin Scorsese	4:36
12.	"Mr. Tambourine Man^"		released on The Bootleg Series, Vol. 5: Bob Dylan Live 1975	5:47
13.	"Oh, Sister"	Bob Dylan, Jacques Levy		4:15
14.	"Hurricane"	Bob Dylan, Jacques Levy		8:03
15.	"One More Cup of Coffee (Valley Below)"			4:02
16.	"Sara"		released on The Bootleg Series, Vol. 5: Bob Dylan Live 1975	4:42
17.	"Just Like a Woman"			4:20
18.	"Knockin’ on Heaven’s Door"			3:59
19.	"This Land Is Your Land"	Woody Guthrie		3:42
Total length:				85:19

Disc 10–11 – Boston Music Hall, Boston, MA – November 21, 1975 (evening)
No.	Title	Writer(s)	Note	Length
1.	"When I Paint My Masterpiece"			4:27
2.	"It Ain’t Me, Babe"			5:13
3.	"The Lonesome Death of Hattie Carroll"		released on The Bootleg Series, Vol. 5: Bob Dylan Live 1975	5:30
4.	"It Takes a Lot to Laugh, It Takes a Train to Cry"		included in the film Renaldo and Clara released on The Bootleg Series, Vol. 5: Bob Dylan Live 1975	3:28
5.	"Romance in Durango"	Bob Dylan, Jacques Levy		4:52
6.	"Isis"	Bob Dylan, Jacques Levy	released on The Bootleg Series, Vol. 5: Bob Dylan Live 1975	5:21
7.	"Blowin' in the Wind"		released on The Bootleg Series, Vol. 5: Bob Dylan Live 1975	2:52
8.	"The Water Is Wide"		released on The Bootleg Series, Vol. 5: Bob Dylan Live 1975	5:15
9.	"Mama, You Been on My Mind"			2:54
10.	"Dark as a Dungeon"	Merle Travis		3:48
11.	"I Shall Be Released"			4:28
12.	"I Don’t Believe You (She Acts Like We Never Have Met)"			3:13
13.	"Tangled Up in Blue"		included in the film Renaldo and Clara released on The Bootleg Series, Vol. 5: Bob Dylan Live 1975	5:14
14.	"Oh, Sister"	Bob Dylan, Jacques Levy	released on The Bootleg Series, Vol. 5: Bob Dylan Live 1975	4:18
15.	"Hurricane"	Bob Dylan, Jacques Levy		8:07
16.	"One More Cup of Coffee (Valley Below)"		released on The Bootleg Series, Vol. 5: Bob Dylan Live 1975	4:27
17.	"Sara"			5:03
18.	"Just Like a Woman"		released on The Bootleg Series, Vol. 5: Bob Dylan Live 1975	4:12
19.	"Knockin’ on Heaven’s Door"			4:10
20.	"This Land Is Your Land"	Woody Guthrie		3:50
Total length:				90:42

Disc 12–13 – Forum de Montreal, Quebec, Canada – December 4, 1975
No.	Title	Writer(s)	Note	Length
1.	"When I Paint My Masterpiece"			4:22
2.	"It Ain’t Me, Babe"			5:16
3.	"The Lonesome Death of Hattie Carroll"		included in Rolling Thunder Revue: A Bob Dylan Story by Martin Scorsese	5:24
4.	"Tonight I’ll Be Staying Here with You"		released on The Bootleg Series, Vol. 5: Bob Dylan Live 1975	3:55
5.	"A Hard Rain’s a-Gonna Fall"		included in the film Renaldo and Clara released on The Bootleg Series, Vol. 5: Bob Dylan Live 1975 included in Rolling Thunder Revue: A Bob Dylan Story by Martin Scorsese	5:19
6.	"Romance in Durango"	Bob Dylan, Jacques Levy	included in the film Renaldo and Clara	5:16
7.	"Isis"	Bob Dylan, Jacques Levy	included in the film Renaldo and Clara released on 4 Songs from Renaldo and Clara and Biograph	5:17
8.	"Blowin' in the Wind"			2:37
9.	"Dark as a Dungeon"	Merle Travis		3:37
10.	"Mama, You Been on My Mind"			2:49
11.	"Never Let Me Go"	Joseph Scott	included in the film Renaldo and Clara released on 4 Songs from Renaldo and Clara	2:57
12.	"I Dreamed I Saw St. Augustine"		included in Rolling Thunder Revue: A Bob Dylan Story by Martin Scorsese	3:05
13.	"I Shall Be Released"			4:24
14.	"It’s All Over Now, Baby Blue"		released on The Bootleg Series, Vol. 5: Bob Dylan Live 1975	4:24
15.	"Love Minus Zero/No Limit"		released on The Bootleg Series, Vol. 5: Bob Dylan Live 1975	3:34
16.	"Tangled Up in Blue"			6:32
17.	"Oh, Sister"	Bob Dylan, Jacques Levy		3:40
18.	"Hurricane"	Bob Dylan, Jacques Levy		7:55
19.	"One More Cup of Coffee (Valley Below)"		included in the film Renaldo and Clara included in Rolling Thunder Revue: A Bob Dylan Story by Martin Scorsese	4:12
20.	"Sara"		included in the film Renaldo and Clara	4:44
21.	"Just Like a Woman""			4:49
22.	"Knockin’ on Heaven’s Door"			4:05
23.	"This Land Is Your Land"	Woody Guthrie		3:45
Total length:				101:58

Disc 14 – Rare Performances
No.	Title	Writer(s)	Note	Length
1.	"One Too Many Mornings"		October 24 – Gerde's Folk City, New York City, New York included in Rolling Thunder Revue: A Bob Dylan Story by Martin Scorsese	3:45
2.	"Simple Twist of Fate"		October 28 – Mahjong Parlor, Falmouth, Massachusetts included in Rolling Thunder Revue: A Bob Dylan Story by Martin Scorsese	5:53
3.	"Isis"	Bob Dylan, Jacques Levy	November 2 – Technical University, Lowell, Massachusetts	7:16
4.	"With God on Our Side"		November 4 – Civic Center, Providence, Rhode Island (afternoon)	5:36
5.	"It’s Alright, Ma (I’m Only Bleeding)"		November 4 – Civic Center, Providence, Rhode Island (evening)	5:44
6.	"Radio advertisement for Niagara Falls shows"		Niagara Falls, New York	0:59
7.	"The Ballad of Ira Hayes"	Peter LaFarge	November 16 – Tuscarora Reservation, Niagara County, New York included in Rolling Thunder Revue: A Bob Dylan Story by Martin Scorsese	2:53
8.	"Your Cheatin’ Heart"	Hank Williams	November 23 included in Rolling Thunder Revue: A Bob Dylan Story by Martin Scorsese	1:51
9.	"Fourth Time Around"		November 26 – Civic Center, Augusta, Maine	3:07
10.	"The Tracks of My Tears"	Pete Moore, William Robinson Jr., and Marvin Tarplin	December 3 – Château Champlain, Montreal, Canada	2:03
11.	"Jesse James"		December 5 – Montreal Stables, Montreal, Canada	1:51
12.	"It Takes a Lot to Laugh, It Takes a Train to Cry"		December 8 – "Night of the Hurricane," Madison Square Garden, New York City, New York	3:32
Total length:				44:30

== Personnel ==
All songs, but the rarities Disc:

- Bob Dylan – vocals, guitar, piano, harmonica

Guam

- Ronee Blakley – vocals
- T Bone Burnett – guitar, vocals
- Ramblin’ Jack Elliott – vocals, guitar
- Allen Ginsberg – vocals, finger cymbals
- David Mansfield – steel guitar, mandolin, violin, dobro
- Joni Mitchell – vocals
- Bobby Neuwirth – guitar, vocals
- Scarlet Rivera – violin
- Luther Rix – drums, percussion, congas
- Mick Ronson – guitar
- Steven Soles – guitar, vocals
- Rob Stoner – bass guitar, vocals
- Howie Wyeth – drums, piano

Guest musicians

- Joan Baez – vocals and guitar on "Tears of Rage", "I Shall Be Released", "Blowin' in the Wind", "Wild Mountain Thyme", "Mama, You Been on My Mind", "Dark as a Dungeon", "The Times They Are A-Changin'", "I Dreamed I Saw St. Augustine", "Never Let Me Go", "The Water Is Wide", and "This Land Is Your Land"
- Roger McGuinn – guitar and vocals on "Knockin" on Heaven's Door" and "This Land Is Your Land"

Disc 14:

- Bob Dylan – vocals, guitar, piano, harmonica with
- Eric Andersen – guitars on "Simple Twist of Fate", member of Guam on "Isis", "The Tracks of My Tears", and "It Takes a Lot to Laugh, It Takes a Train to Cry"
- Joan Baez – vocals on "Simple Twist of Fate"
- Larry Keegan – vocals on "Your Cheatin' Heart"
- Rob Stoner – bass guitar on "Simple Twist of Fate"
- Robbie Robertson – guitar on "It Takes a Lot to Laugh, It Takes a Train to Cry"
- Arlen Roth – guitars on "Simple Twist of Fate", member of Guam on "Isis", "The Tracks of My Tears", and "It Takes a Lot to Laugh, It Takes a Train to Cry"

== Charts ==
Chart (2019)	Peak position
Australian Albums (ARIA)	50
Austrian Albums (Ö3 Austria)	12
Belgian Albums (Ultratop Flanders)	18
Belgian Albums (Ultratop Wallonia)	42
Dutch Albums (Album Top 100)	31
German Albums (Offizielle Top 100)	10
Irish Albums (IRMA)	81
Italian Albums (FIMI)	66
Norwegian Albums (VG-lista)	26
Scottish Albums (OCC)	5
Swedish Albums (Sverigetopplistan)	17
Swiss Albums (Schweizer Hitparade)	18
UK Albums (OCC)	20
US Billboard 200	100
