= Ken Regan =

American photojournalist

Ken Regan (June 15, c. 1940s – November 25, 2012) was an American photojournalist from the Bronx, New York City whose reputation for discretion allowed him close connections with subjects including many musicians, politicians and celebrities. He was the official photographer for the Rolling Stones on several tours in the 1970s. He also was the photojournalist on Bob Dylan’s Rolling Thunder Revue tour in 1975 and the Live Aid concert in 1985.

Regan was the unofficial personal photographer of Senator Ted Kennedy in the last four decades of Kennedy's life. Regan documented Christopher Reeve’s homecoming from rehabilitation after Reeve's 1995 horse accident which left the actor paralyzed. He photographed local politicians including Meade Esposito.

Regan worked with Palace Press Inside Editions on a book called Knockout: The Art of Boxing.

He was described by his colleagues as "a big deal". Regan died of cancer in 2012. A spokesperson from his studio declined to release his age, and instead called him "ageless".
