= Rob Stoner =

American singer (born 1948)

- Born: Robert Rothstein; April 20, 1948 (age 78); Manhattan, New York, United States
- Occupation: Multi-instrumentalist singer
- Instruments: Vocals, guitar, bass, piano

Robert Rothstein (born April 20, 1948), known professionally as Rob Stoner, is an American singer and multi-instrumentalist known for his role as the musical director for three Bob Dylan tours and his contributions to hit albums, including Bob Dylan's Desire and Don McLean's American Pie. He has worked with a wide array of prominent artists across various genres and continues to perform as a solo act. He works as an online guitar instructor.

== Early life ==
Rob Stoner grew up in Manhattan and New Rochelle, NY. He joined the musicians union at age 15, working as a singer-guitarist performing standards from the Great American Songbook. His parents were professional photographers. His father, Arthur Rothstein, is one of the premier photojournalists of the 20th century. He's the uncle of actor-director-screenwriter Noah Segan. Before graduating from NYC's Columbia College in 1969, Stoner began working as a session musician for artists like Don McLean, Pete Seeger, Tim Hardin and others.

== Career ==
Stoner's original compositions have been recorded by Johnny Winter, Link Wray, Robert Gordon, and others. In 1973, he was signed to CBS Records as a country singer. In 1974, Bob Dylan heard Stoner in an LA club and soon hired him as his bandleader and harmony singer. In 1978, Stoner resumed his solo career, releasing critically acclaimed solo albums released on all streaming platforms.

Stoner has worked with a diverse range of artists, including: Link Wray, Chuck Berry, Ringo Starr, Roy Orbison, the Jordanaires, Levon Helm, Carl Perkins, Mick Ronson, Joni Mitchell, Roger McGuinn, Joan Baez, Danny Gatton, Lynn Anderson, Thommy Price, Doug Sahm, James Maddock, Pete Farndon, Topper Headon, Anton Fig, D.J. Fontana, Howie Wyeth, Ed Sanders, Carlos Santana, Kinky Friedman, Gordon Lightfoot, Rick Danko, Tony Garnier, Larry Campbell, David Mansfield, Scarlet Rivera, Kenny Aaronson, Hank DeVito, Emmylou Harris, John Herald, Johnny Thunders, Robbie Robertson, Jack Elliott, Gary Chester, Hank DeVito, Ken Pine, Don Covay, Jerry Garcia, Michael Brecker, Chris Spedding, Timothy B. Schmit, Dan Rothstein, Tommy Allsup, Jerry Foster, Arno Hecht, BJ Thomas, Bobby Chouinard, Allen Ginsberg, Gene Cornish, Robin Williams, Don Imus, the Del-Vikings, Charlie Gracie, Mark Mothersbaugh, Carter Cathcart, and many others. He played piano, guitar, and bass on several albums by Link Wray and Robert Gordon, continuing to work with the latter until 2020.

== Notable work ==
Rob Stoner is featured in the Bob Dylan Rolling Thunder Revue Netflix film, directed by Martin Scorsese. He also acted in Dylan's indie film Renaldo and Clara.

In his Rolling Thunder Logbook, playwright Sam Shepard describes Rob as "the brains behind the operation, grafting harmonies onto Dylan like a Siamese twin." Rolling Stone described his "cool vocals" as "high octane punkabilly," and Hi Fi Magazine wrote that "Stoner has a rich, romantic voice, full of rich expression."

== Personal life ==
Rob lives in Nyack, NY. The stage name "Stoner" had no meaning when Rob began using it; the word "stoner" did not come into use until years later. It is derived from Rothstein, which means "red stone" in German.
