= Scarlet Rivera =

American violinist

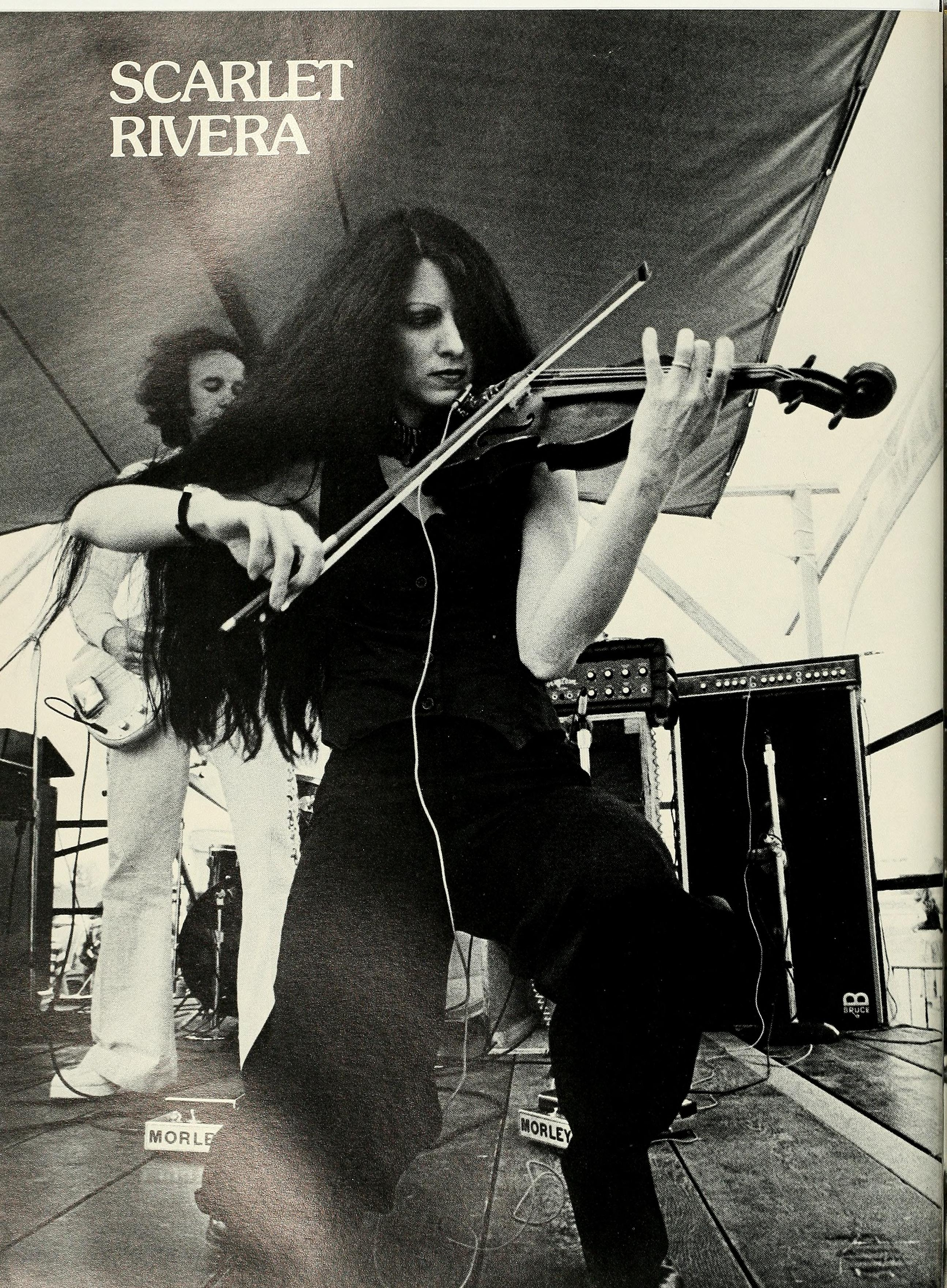
- Rivera at the 1976 New Orleans Jazz & Heritage Festival

Background information
- Born: Donna Shea; 1950 (age 75–76); Chicago, Illinois, United States
- Genres: Rock; Celtic; new-age; world music
- Instrument: Violin
- Years active: 1975–present
- Labels: Bci; Eclipse
- Spouse: Tommy Eyre (m. 1981; died 2001)
- Website: scarletriveramusic.com

Donna Eyre (née Shea; born 1950), known professionally as Scarlet Rivera, is an American violinist. She is best known for her work with Bob Dylan, in particular on his 1976 album Desire and as part of the Rolling Thunder Revue.

== Life and career ==
Born Donna Shea in Joliet, Illinois, Rivera was privately trained in classical violin and studied at the Mannes School of Music.

Bob Dylan is said to have discovered Rivera in New York City before the rehearsal for his 1975 Rolling Thunder Revue tour. While being driven in his limousine around Greenwich Village, Dylan spotted Rivera walking with her violin case. Dylan stopped to talk with Rivera and invited her to his rehearsal studio, where she spent the afternoon playing along with several of his new songs. "If I had crossed the street seconds earlier," said Rivera in 2012, "it never would have happened." After a session with her, Dylan invited Rivera to play on the Rolling Thunder Revue tour. She played an important role on Dylan's studio album Desire.

In 1977, Rivera released her self-titled debut LP for Warner Bros. Records. Lindsay Planer from AllMusic praises the album, saying that Rivera "has consistently found specific and viable places for the violin in rock".

Rivera has recorded multiple albums as a composer in numerous styles, instrumental, new-age, Celtic and world music. She has performed in the US, Europe and Japan with her Celtic group. Rivera was a soloist with the Duke Ellington Orchestra at Carnegie Hall, the Kennedy Center, and the Carnival of Venice.

She has also appeared on albums by Tracy Chapman (Crossroads), Keb Mo' (The Door), Dee Dee Bridgewater (Just Family), David Johansen (David Johansen), and Indigo Girls.

In recent years, Rivera has recorded new age, instrumental, world, and Celtic music. She has also toured in Japan with the US-based South American group Ritual with Uruguayans Federico Ramos and Eduardo Marquez del Signore. She recorded the album Celtic Mist which was released in Japan. She also played violin on the 2014 album After the Fall, by UK-based Dodson and Fogg.

She was a special guest artist in the band in Joni 75: A Birthday Celebration, a birthday concert held in honor of Joni Mitchell on November 7, 2018, in Los Angeles and also in the concert with Brandi Carlile for Mitchell's Blue album in October 2019.

Rivera was featured in Martin Scorsese's 2019 pseudo-documentary film Rolling Thunder Revue: A Bob Dylan Story and attended the premiere in New York in June 2019.

Rivera released the EP All of Me in April 2020 on Bright Sun Records, singing her own songs.

In May 2021, to celebrate Bob Dylan's 80th birthday, Rivera, along with Nine Mile Station, released a new version of "Hurricane". Paul Zollo, a writer for American Songwriter, said that "Her presence of sound and spirit lifts this 'Hurricane' into a higher realm. The reverence she has for the song and its songwriter shines in the purity and passion of her playing."

She continues to be an active recording artist, performer and composer. Her album Celtic Magic was set to be released in 2022.

== Personal life ==
Rivera is of Irish-Sicilian ancestry.

She was married in 1991 to the British session keyboardist Tommy Eyre. The marriage lasted until his death in 2001.

== Discography ==
- Scarlet Rivera (Warner Bros., 1977)
- Scarlet Fever (Warner Bros., 1978)
- Celtic Dreams (Bci/Eclipse Music, 1998)
- Celtic Myst (Bci/Eclipse Music, 1998)
- Behind the Crimson Veil – Scarlet Rivera and Tommy Eyre (Bci/Eclipse Music, 1999)
- Celtic Spirit (Bci/Eclipse Music, 1998)
- Voice of the Animals (Scarlet Rivera, 2000)
- Journey with an Angel (Echo Sonic, 2003)
- Magical Christmas (Bci/Eclipse Music, 2004)
- A New Map of the World (Disconforme [Spain], 2004) by Ritual (Uruguay)
- Hope: Intermezzo Sinfonico (Clara Luz Music BMI, 2015) by Eduardo Del Signore

=== With Bob Dylan ===
- Bootleg Series, Vol. 1–3 (c. 1975–1976) (Columbia, 1991)
- The Bootleg Series Vol. 5: Bob Dylan Live 1975, The Rolling Thunder Revue (1975) (Columbia, 2002)
- Bob Dylan - The Rolling Thunder Revue: The 1975 Live Recordings (1975) (Columbia, 2019)
- Desire (1976) (Columbia)
- Hard Rain (1976)

=== With Peter Maffay ===
- Sonne in der Nacht - 1. Diese Sucht die Leben heißt, (LP, CD, Video, DVD) (1984) (WEA Musik)

=== With Dee Dee Bridgewater ===
- Just Family (Elektra, 1977)
