= Don DeVito =

American record producer (1939–2011)

- Born: September 6, 1939; Brooklyn, New York
- Died: November 25, 2011 (aged 72)
- Occupations: Record producer, music business executive and guitarist
- Notable work: Grammy award in 1989 for the Best Traditional Folk Recording

Don DeVito (September 6, 1939 – November 25, 2011) was an American record producer, music business executive and guitarist. His career was spent at Columbia Records, where his production credits included Bob Dylan's albums Desire, Hard Rain, Street-Legal, and Bob Dylan At Budokan.

== Early life ==
He was born on September 6, 1939, in Brooklyn, New York to Connie and Ralph DeVito, and in his late teens began playing as a guitarist in Al Kooper's band. After a year touring, he returned to college where he achieved a degree in English, before forming his own band, the Sabres.

== Career ==
The band broke up while on a cross-country tour, leaving DeVito stranded in Fort Smith, Arkansas. There, he fortuitously met Johnny Cash. In 1967, DeVito began training as an executive with CBS, and worked as A&R manager covering Miami, Florida before transferring to New York City in 1971 to head up a new marketing initiative, later moving to the main Columbia A&R department. He also began spending time in recording studios to learn from such producers as Bob Johnston, James William Guercio and Phil Ramone.

Having been introduced by Cash to Bob Dylan, DeVito helped in the process of returning Dylan to Columbia from Asylum Records in 1975. Though commonly misreported as having produced Dylan's decade zenith, 1975's Blood on the Tracks, DeVito did produce the following year's Desire which, like its predecessor, reached no. 1 on the Billboard album chart. He also joined Dylan on tour and produced Desire's follow up, Street-Legal, as well as period live albums Hard Rain (1976) and At Budokan (1978). DeVito also worked as A&R Director for Billy Joel, Bruce Springsteen, James Taylor, Simon and Garfunkel, Aerosmith, Tony Bennett and Carole King. A generous mentor, his protégés included Warner/Chappel Music's Lee Dannay, and Daniel Levitin.

In 1981 he was appointed National Vice President of A&R for Columbia. He was nominated for a Grammy Award on five occasions, winning in the category of Best Traditional Folk Recording in 1989 for the album Folkways—A Vision Shared: A Tribute to Woody Guthrie & Leadbelly. In 2001, he was instrumental in organizing and promoting The Concert for New York City, which raised over one million dollars in the aftermath of the 9/11 attacks. He retired from Sony Music in 2007.

== Death ==
He died in 2011 at the age of 72, after a prolonged period with prostate cancer. Billy Joel, Rosanne Cash, Daniel Levitin, and others performed at the funeral. He is survived by his wife Carolyn and his two children Marissa and James.
