= Bob Dylan Gospel Tour =

1979–80 concert tour by Bob Dylan

- Tour by Bob Dylan
- Poster to the concert in San Francisco, USA
- Location: North America
- Associated album: Slow Train Coming; Saved
- Start date: November 1, 1979
- End date: May 21, 1980
- Legs: 3
- No. of shows: 79
- Website: www.bobdylan.com

Bob Dylan concert chronology
- World Tour (1978); Gospel Tour (1979–80); A Musical Retrospective Tour (1980)

The Bob Dylan Gospel Tour was a concert tour by American singer-songwriter Bob Dylan that consisted of 79 concerts in North America in three legs, lasting from November 1, 1979, to May 21, 1980.

== Background ==
In February 1978, Dylan initiated a ten-month World Tour that consisted of 114 concerts in ten countries. On June 15, Dylan released the album Street-Legal, which received poor reviews from most American critics. Performances on his world tour also received negative reviews. The physical demands of touring were also taking a toll on the artist. During a concert on November 17 in San Diego, someone from the audience threw a small silver cross on stage. Dylan later recalled in a 1979 interview:

Towards the end of the show someone out in the crowd ... knew I wasn't feeling too well. I think they could see that. And they threw a silver cross on the stage. Now usually I don't pick things up in front of the stage ... But I looked down at that cross. I said, 'I gotta pick that up.' So I picked up the cross and I put it in my pocket ... And I brought it backstage and I brought it with me to the next town, which was out in Arizona ... I was feeling even worse than I'd felt when I was in San Diego. I said, 'Well, I need something tonight.' I didn't know what it was. I was used to all kinds of things. I said, 'I need something tonight that I didn't have before.' And I looked in my pocket and I had this cross.

Toward the end of his 1978 World Tour, Dylan began performing a new song during sound checks called "Slow Train"—a song with overtly Christian lyrics. During the final concert of the tour on December 16, 1978, in Hollywood, Florida, he performed another new song called "Do Right to Me Baby (Do Unto Others)", with lyrics centered around a Biblical passage from Matthew 7:12, "All things, therefore, that you want men to do to you, you also must likewise do to them; this, in fact, is what the Law and the Prophets mean."

According to Dylan, a turning point came one night in late 1978 when he received a "vision and a feeling" that his born-again Christian girlfriend Mary Alice Artres believed was a "visit from Jesus himself". Dylan later said, "Jesus put his hand on me. It was a physical thing. I felt it. I felt it all over me. I felt my whole body tremble. The glory of the Lord knocked me down and picked me up."

Artes was not the only born-again Christian in Dylan's touring band. Steven Soles and David Mansfield were already members of the Vineyard Fellowship, a Christian organization introduced to them by guitarist T-Bone Burnett. According to bassist Rob Stoner, it was Burnette who first began talking to Dylan about Jesus and the Fellowship. Dylan also turned to Helena Springs with "questions that no one could possibly help with", and she encouraged him to pray. Dylan's girlfriend Artes was also a member of Vineyard Fellowship, and it was through her influence that Dylan eventually agreed to attend a three-month Bible study course with Ken Gulliksen.

In the first months of 1979, Dylan was writing songs clearly influenced by his new-found Christian faith and Bible study. Dylan initially intended to produce the songs for singer Carolyn Dennis anonymously. "I wanted the songs out", Dylan later recalled, "but I didn't want to do it [myself], because I knew that it wouldn't be perceived in that way. It would just mean more pressure. I just did not want that at that time." Eventually Dylan decided to record the songs himself, and assembled a strong group of musicians and production people, including Mark Knopfler and Muscle Shoals veterans Barry Beckett and Jerry Wexler, who would co-produce the album with Dylan. Between April 30 and May 11, 1979, Dylan recorded material for a new album at Muscle Shoals, Alabama. The new album of Christian songs called Slow Train Coming was released on August 20, 1979.

On October 18, 1979, Dylan and his new backing band appeared on the television show Saturday Night Live, performing three songs from the new album: "Gotta Serve Somebody", "I Believe in You", and "When You Gonna Wake Up". Two weeks later, on November 1, 1979, Dylan and his new band initiated a new tour with a fourteen-concert engagement at the Fox Warfield Theatre in San Francisco.

== Description ==
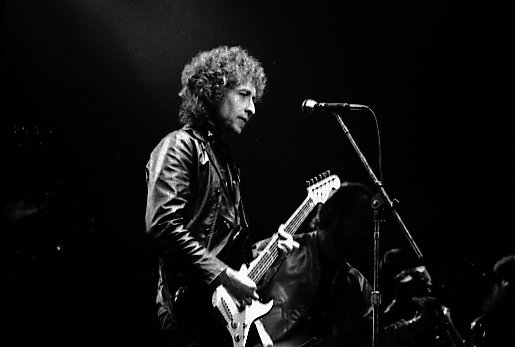
Massey Hall, Toronto, April 18, 1980

The Bob Dylan Gospel Tour was unique in two respects. While Dylan had always included religious themes and allusions in his songs, this tour marked the first time that he overtly embraced Christianity as a personal faith, and discussed that faith from the stage with his audience. Also, Dylan restricted the concert setlists to include only his new Christian songs. None of his past material was included. The tour was divided into three legs over a period of seven months. The first leg included 26 concerts from November 1 to December 9. The second leg included 22 concerts from January 13 to February 9. The third leg included 29 concerts from April 17 to May 21.

The tour lineup for the first leg of the tour consisted of Bob Dylan (guitar, piano, harmonica, vocals), Spooner Oldham (keyboards, vocals), Terry Young (keyboards, vocals), Fred Tackett (guitar), Tim Drummond (bass), Jim Keltner (drums), Regina Havis (vocals), Helena Springs (vocals), and Mona Lisa Young (vocals). Typically, shows opened with vocalist Regina Havis stepping to the microphone and delivering a monologue on Christian faith. She was then joined on stage by vocalist Helena Springs, pianist Terry Young, and his wife Mona Lisa Young who performed a half dozen gospel songs, such as "If I Got My Ticket Lord", "It's Gonna Rain", "Do Lord, Remember Me", "Look Up And Live By Faith", and "Oh Freedom".

After a brief interlude, Dylan and his backing band emerged and performed typically a 17-song set consisting of songs from the album Slow Train Coming and additional new Christian songs, most of which would end up on his follow-up album Saved. He opened most shows with "Gotta Serve Somebody", "I Believe in You", "When You Gonna Wake Up", "When He Returns", and "Man Gave Names to All the Animals", and the setlists did not vary significantly from night to night. Halfway through the set, following the song "Covenant Woman", one of his backing vocalists would take center stage and perform a gospel song while Dylan stood to the side and listened. These songs included "Put Your Hand in the Hand" (sung by Regina Havis), "What Are You Doing With Your Heart" (sung by Helena Springs), and "God Uses Ordinary People" (sung by Mona Lisa Young). Most shows ended with "Solid Rock", "Saving Grace", "Saved", "What Can I Do for You?", "In the Garden", "Are You Ready", and "Pressing On". Dylan performed most of the songs playing a black Fender Stratocaster guitar. He performed a few songs with just a microphone, and played piano on "When He Returns" and "Pressing On". Dylan's one harmonica solo on "What Can I Do for You?" was one of the highlights of his shows. The first leg of the tour ended with a two-night engagement at the Music Hall in Tucson.

After taking one month off for the Christmas holidays in Minnesota, Dylan resumed the tour on January 13, 1980, with a three-night engagement at Paramount Northwest Theatre in Seattle. For this second leg of the tour, Helena Springs was replaced by Carolyn Dennis (vocals) and Regina Peeples (vocals). The concerts were similar to those of the first leg, with similar setlists. The second leg of the tour concluded with a two-night engagement at the Municipal Auditorium in Charleston, West Virginia on February 9.

Dylan and his touring band immediately traveled to Muscle Shoals Sound Studio in Sheffield, Alabama to record the new songs they had been performing for the album Saved. Recording sessions lasted just five days, February 11–15. Producer Jerry Wexler later recalled, "The arrangements were built in, because the band had been playing the songs live. Most of the licks are their own licks, which they perfected on the road."

After taking the month of March off, Dylan and his touring band resumed the tour on April 17 with a four-night engagement at Massey Hall in Toronto. For the third leg of the tour, Carolyn Dennis was replaced by Clydie King (vocals), Gwen Evans (vocals), and Mary Elizabeth Bridges (vocals). At the Toronto concerts, Dylan introduced three new Christian songs not included on Saved, "Ain't Gonna Go to Hell for Anybody", "Cover Down, Pray Through", and "I Will Love Him". The April 20 show at Massey Hall was filmed, but never officially released. After a four-night engagement at Le Theatre Saint-Denis in Montreal, the tour headed back to the United States northeast, and concluded with four concerts in the Midwest. The final show was held at Memorial Hall in Dayton, Ohio on May 21.

== Tour dates ==
Date	City	Country	Venue	Setlist
First leg
November 1, 1979	San Francisco	United States	Fox Warfield Theatre	1
November 2, 1979	San Francisco	United States	Fox Warfield Theatre	1
November 3, 1979	San Francisco	United States	Fox Warfield Theatre	1
November 4, 1979	San Francisco	United States	Fox Warfield Theatre	1
November 6, 1979	San Francisco	United States	Fox Warfield Theatre	1
November 7, 1979	San Francisco	United States	Fox Warfield Theatre	1
November 8, 1979	San Francisco	United States	Fox Warfield Theatre	1
November 9, 1979	San Francisco	United States	Fox Warfield Theatre	1
November 10, 1979	San Francisco	United States	Fox Warfield Theatre	1
November 11, 1979	San Francisco	United States	Fox Warfield Theatre	1
November 13, 1979	San Francisco	United States	Fox Warfield Theatre	1
November 14, 1979	San Francisco	United States	Fox Warfield Theatre	2
November 15, 1979	San Francisco	United States	Fox Warfield Theatre	1
November 16, 1979	San Francisco	United States	Fox Warfield Theatre	3
November 18, 1979	Santa Monica	United States	Santa Monica Civic Auditorium	4
November 19, 1979	Santa Monica	United States	Santa Monica Civic Auditorium	4
November 20, 1979	Santa Monica	United States	Santa Monica Civic Auditorium	4
November 21, 1979	Santa Monica	United States	Santa Monica Civic Auditorium	4
November 25, 1979	Tempe	United States	Gammage Center	5
November 26, 1979	Tempe	United States	Gammage Center	6
November 27, 1979	San Diego	United States	Golden Hall	4
November 28, 1979	San Diego	United States	Golden Hall	4
December 4, 1979	Albuquerque	United States	Kiva Auditorium	4
December 5, 1979	Albuquerque	United States	Kiva Auditorium	4
December 8, 1979	Tucson	United States	Tucson Music Hall	4
December 9, 1979	Tucson	United States	Tucson Music Hall	4
Second leg
January 11, 1980	Portland	United States	Paramount Theatre	
January 12, 1980	Portland	United States	Paramount Theatre	
January 13, 1980	Seattle	United States	Paramount Northwest Theatre	4
January 14, 1980	Seattle	United States	Paramount Northwest Theatre	4
January 15, 1980	Seattle	United States	Paramount Northwest Theatre	4
January 16, 1980	Portland	United States	Paramount Theatre	4
January 17, 1980	Spokane	United States	Spokane Opera House	4
January 18, 1980	Spokane	United States	Spokane Opera House	4
January 21, 1980	Denver	United States	Rainbow Music Hall	7
January 22, 1980	Denver	United States	Rainbow Music Hall	4
January 23, 1980	Denver	United States	Rainbow Music Hall	4
January 25, 1980	Omaha	United States	Orpheum Theater	4
January 26, 1980	Omaha	United States	Orpheum Theater	4
January 27, 1980	Kansas City	United States	Uptown Theater	4
January 28, 1980	Kansas City	United States	Uptown Theater	4
January 29, 1980	Kansas City	United States	Uptown Theater	4
January 31, 1980	Memphis	United States	Orpheum Theater	4
February 1, 1980	Memphis	United States	Orpheum Theater	4
February 2, 1980	Birmingham	United States	Jefferson Civic Center	8
February 3, 1980	Birmingham	United States	Jefferson Civic Center	8
February 5, 1980	Knoxville	United States	Knoxville Civic Auditorium	4
February 6, 1980	Knoxville	United States	Knoxville Civic Auditorium	4
February 8, 1980	Charleston	United States	Charleston Municipal Auditorium	9
February 9, 1980	Charleston	United States	Charleston Municipal Auditorium	10
Third leg
April 17, 1980	Toronto	Canada	Massey Hall	11
April 18, 1980	Toronto	Canada	Massey Hall	11
April 19, 1980	Toronto	Canada	Massey Hall	12
April 20, 1980	Toronto	Canada	Massey Hall	11
April 22, 1980	Montreal	Canada	Le Theatre Saint-Denis	11
April 23, 1980	Montreal	Canada	Le Theatre Saint-Denis	11
April 24, 1980	Montreal	Canada	Le Theatre Saint-Denis	11
April 25, 1980	Montreal	Canada	Le Theatre Saint-Denis	11
April 27, 1980	Albany	United States	Palace Theatre	11
April 28, 1980	Albany	United States	Palace Theatre	11
April 30, 1980	Buffalo	United States	Kleinhans Music Hall	11
May 1, 1980	Buffalo	United States	Kleinhans Music Hall	13
May 2, 1980	Worcester	United States	Memorial Theater	11
May 3, 1980	Worcester	United States	Memorial Theater	11
May 4, 1980	Syracuse	United States	Landmark Theatre	11
May 5, 1980	Syracuse	United States	Landmark Theatre	11
May 7, 1980	Hartford	United States	Bushnell Memorial Hall	14
May 8, 1980	Hartford	United States	Bushnell Memorial Hall	11
May 9, 1980	Portland	United States	Portland City Hall	11
May 10, 1980	Portland	United States	Portland City Hall	11
May 11, 1980	Providence	United States	Ocean State Performing Arts Center	11
May 12, 1980	Providence	United States	Ocean State Performing Arts Center	11
May 14, 1980	Pittsburgh	United States	Stanley Theatre	11
May 15, 1980	Pittsburgh	United States	Stanley Theatre	11
May 16, 1980	Pittsburgh	United States	Stanley Theatre	15
May 17, 1980	Akron	United States	Akron Civic Theatre	16
May 18, 1980	Akron	United States	Akron Civic Theatre	17
May 20, 1980	Columbus	United States	Franklin County Veterans Memorial Auditorium	11
May 21, 1980	Dayton	United States	Memorial Hall	14

== Setlists ==
- Setlist 1 – Gotta Serve Somebody, I Believe In You, When You Gonna Wake Up, When He Returns, Man Gave Names to All the Animals, Precious Angel, Slow Train, Covenant Woman, Gonna Change My Way of Thinking, Do Right to Me Baby (Do Unto Others), Solid Rock, Saving Grace, What Can I Do for You?, Saved, In the Garden, Blessed Be the Name, Pressing On
- Setlist 2 – Gotta Serve Somebody, I Believe In You, When You Gonna Wake Up, When He Returns, Man Gave Names to All the Animals, Slow Train, Covenant Woman, Gonna Change My Way of Thinking, Do Right to Me Baby (Do Unto Others), Solid Rock, Saving Grace, What Can I Do for You?, In the Garden, Saved, Blessed Be the Name, Pressing On
- Setlist 3 – Gotta Serve Somebody, I Believe In You, When You Gonna Wake Up, When He Returns, Man Gave Names to All the Animals, Precious Angel, Slow Train, Covenant Woman, Ain't No Man Righteous, No Not One, Gonna Change My Way of Thinking, Do Right to Me Baby (Do Unto Others), Solid Rock, Saving Grace, What Can I Do for You?, In the Garden, Saved, Blessed Be the Name, Pressing On
- Setlist 4 – Gotta Serve Somebody, I Believe In You, When You Gonna Wake Up, When He Returns, Man Gave Names to All the Animals, Precious Angel, Slow Train, Covenant Woman, Gonna Change My Way of Thinking, Do Right to Me Baby (Do Unto Others), Solid Rock, Saving Grace, Saved, What Can I Do for You?, In the Garden, Blessed Be the Name, Pressing On
- Setlist 5 – Gotta Serve Somebody, I Believe In You, When You Gonna Wake Up, When He Returns, Man Gave Names to All the Animals, Precious Angel, Slow Train, Covenant Woman, Gonna Change My Way of Thinking, Do Right to Me Baby (Do Unto Others), Solid Rock, Saving Grace, Saved, What Can I Do for You?, In the Garden, Blessed Be the Name
- Setlist 6 – Gotta Serve Somebody, I Believe In You, When You Gonna Wake Up, When He Returns, Man Gave Names to All the Animals, Precious Angel, Slow Train, Covenant Woman, Gonna Change My Way of Thinking, Do Right to Me Baby (Do Unto Others), Solid Rock, Saving Grace, Saved, What Can I Do for You?, In the Garden
- Setlist 7 – When He Returns, Man Gave Names to All the Animals, Precious Angel, Slow Train, Gonna Change My Way of Thinking, Do Right to Me Baby (Do Unto Others), Solid Rock, Saving Grace
- Setlist 8 – Gotta Serve Somebody, I Believe In You, When You Gonna Wake Up, When He Returns, Man Gave Names to All the Animals, Precious Angel, Slow Train, Covenant Woman, Gonna Change My Way of Thinking, Do Right to Me Baby (Do Unto Others), Solid Rock, Saving Grace, Saved, What Can I Do for You?, In the Garden, Blessed Be the Name
- Setlist 9 – Gotta Serve Somebody, I Believe In You, When You Gonna Wake Up, When He Returns, Man Gave Names to All the Animals, Precious Angel, Slow Train, Covenant Woman, Gonna Change My Way of Thinking, Do Right to Me Baby (Do Unto Others), Solid Rock, Saving Grace, Saved, What Can I Do for You?, In the Garden, Are You Ready, Blessed Be the Name
- Setlist 10 – Gotta Serve Somebody, I Believe In You, When You Gonna Wake Up, When He Returns, Man Gave Names to All the Animals, Precious Angel, Slow Train, Covenant Woman, Gonna Change My Way of Thinking, Do Right to Me Baby (Do Unto Others), Solid Rock, Saving Grace, Saved, What Can I Do for You?, In the Garden, Are You Ready, Pressing On
- Setlist 11 – Gotta Serve Somebody, I Believe In You, When You Gonna Wake Up, Ain't Gonna Go to Hell for Anybody, Cover Down, Break Through, Precious Angel, Man Gave Names to All the Animals, Slow Train, Do Right to Me Baby (Do Unto Others), Solid Rock, Saving Grace, Saved, What Can I Do for You?, In the Garden, Are You Ready, Pressing On
- Setlist 12 – Gotta Serve Somebody, Covenant Woman, When You Gonna Wake Up, Ain't Gonna Go to Hell for Anybody, Cover Down, Break Through, Man Gave Names to All the Animals, Precious Angel, Slow Train, Do Right to Me Baby (Do Unto Others), Solid Rock, Saving Grace, What Can I Do for You?, Saved, In the Garden, Are You Ready, I Will Love Him
- Setlist 13 – When You Gonna Wake Up, Man Gave Names to All the Animals, Precious Angel, Slow Train, Do Right to Me Baby (Do Unto Others), Solid Rock, Saving Grace, What Can I Do for You?, Saved, In the Garden, Pressing On, Are You Ready, Ain't Gonna Go to Hell for Anybody, Cover Down, Break Through
- Setlist 14 – Gotta Serve Somebody, I Believe In You, When You Gonna Wake Up, Ain't Gonna Go to Hell for Anybody, Cover Down, Break Through, Precious Angel, Man Gave Names to All the Animals, Slow Train, Ain't No Man Righteous, No Not One, Do Right to Me Baby (Do Unto Others), Solid Rock, Saving Grace, Saved, What Can I Do for You?, In the Garden, Are You Ready, Pressing On
- Setlist 15 – Gotta Serve Somebody, I Believe In You, When You Gonna Wake Up, Ain't Gonna Go to Hell for Anybody, Cover Down, Break Through, Precious Angel, Man Gave Names to All the Animals, Slow Train, Do Right to Me Baby (Do Unto Others), Solid Rock, Saving Grace, Saved, What Can I Do for You?, Lay, Lady, Lay, In the Garden, Are You Ready, Pressing On
- Setlist 16 – Gotta Serve Somebody, I Believe In You, When You Gonna Wake Up, Ain't Gonna Go to Hell for Anybody, Cover Down, Break Through, Precious Angel, Man Gave Names to All the Animals, Slow Train, Do Right to Me Baby (Do Unto Others), Solid Rock, Saving Grace, Saved, What Can I Do for You?, In the Garden, Are You Ready, Pressing On, Blessed Be the Name
- Setlist 17 – Gotta Serve Somebody, I Believe In You, When You Gonna Wake Up, Ain't Gonna Go to Hell for Anybody, Cover Down, Break Through, Precious Angel, Man Gave Names to All the Animals, Slow Train, When He Returns, Solid Rock, Saving Grace, Saved, What Can I Do for You?, In the Garden, Are You Ready, Pressing On, I Will Sing
- Setlist 18 – Gotta Serve Somebody, I Believe In You, When You Gonna Wake Up, Ain't Gonna Go to Hell for Anybody, Cover Down, Break Through, Precious Angel, Man Gave Names to All the Animals, Slow Train, Ain't No Man Righteous, No Not One, Do Right to Me Baby (Do Unto Others), Solid Rock, Saving Grace, Saved, What Can I Do for You?, In the Garden, Are You Ready, Pressing On
