= The Bootleg Series Vol. 13: Trouble No More 1979–1981 =

Compilation album by Bob Dylan
- Released: November 3, 2017
- Recorded: 1978–1981
- Genre: Gospel
- Length: 2:32:58 (standard); 8:10:19 (deluxe)
- Label: Columbia

Bob Dylan chronology
Triplicate (2017)	The Bootleg Series Vol. 13: Trouble No More 1979–1981 (2017)	The Bootleg Series Vol. 14: More Blood, More Tracks (2018)

Bob Dylan Bootleg Series chronology
Vol. 12: The Cutting Edge 1965–1966 (2015)	Vol. 13: Trouble No More 1979–1981 (2017)	Vol. 14: More Blood, More Tracks (2018)

Singles from The Bootleg Series Vol. 13: Trouble No More 1979–1981
- 1. "When You Gonna Wake Up (Oslo, Norway – July 9, 1981)" Released: September 20, 2017

The Bootleg Series Vol. 13: Trouble No More 1979–1981 is a set of recordings from 1979 to 1981 by Bob Dylan that showcases the music he wrote and performed during his born-again Christian period, covered in the studio albums Slow Train Coming, Saved and Shot of Love.

The 11th installment in the Bob Dylan Bootleg Series, it was released by Legacy Records on November 3, 2017, and is available in three versions: a two-disc set common to the rest of the series after the first three volumes; a four-LP album version of the standard set; and a nine-disc deluxe version with one disc a DVD. A two-disc bonus set was available initially with the deluxe version, and the standard two-disc set comprises the material on the first two discs of the deluxe set.

Professional ratings
Aggregate scores
Source	Rating
Metacritic	88/100
Review scores
Source	Rating
AllMusic	4/5 stars
The Austin Chronicle	4.5/5 stars
The Line of Best Fit	8.5/10
Pitchfork	8.1/10
PopMatters	9/10
Record Collector	4/5 stars
Rolling Stone	4/5 stars
Uncut	7/10

== History ==
In late 1978, Dylan became a Christian. He soon began to write Christian-themed and explicitly Christian songs, which appeared on Slow Train Coming (1979), Saved (1980), and portions of Shot of Love (1981). Their religious sentiments baffled segments of Dylan's fanbase—just as Dylan's "going electric" had alienated folk purists in 1965.

== Content ==
Trouble No More consists mostly of live recordings from this era, plus unreleased session demos and outtakes from recording sessions for the three studio albums he recorded in the period. On September 20, 2017, the song "When You Gonna Wake Up (Oslo, Norway – July 9, 1981)" was published on Dylan's YouTube channel. It was the first single from the set, which was released in a number of different editions and media formats.

The standard two-disc edition contains live versions of every song that originally appeared on the albums Slow Train Coming, Saved, and Shot of Love with the exceptions of the Porter Wagoner cover "A Satisfied Mind" on Saved and "Heart of Mine", "Property of Jesus", "Lenny Bruce", and "Trouble" from Shot of Love. Three of its songs had been previously unreleased.

The deluxe nine-disc box set duplicates the standard set for its first two discs, and includes an additional six compact discs of music plus a ninth disc containing a documentary about this period of Dylan's work on DVD. The deluxe set premiered 100 previously unreleased recordings, both live and studio, including 14 unreleased songs (with the exception of "Ye Shall Be Changed", released in 1991 on The Bootleg Series, Vol. 1–3), a 120-page photo book and extensive liner notes. The box contains over eight hours of music, and two bonus discs with the complete concert from San Diego in 1979 were included with purchase of the deluxe edition through the official Dylan website.

The DVD documentary Trouble No More: A Musical Film (US, 2017, 59 min.), is a new feature-length cinematic presentation directed by Jennifer Lebeau and Ron Kantor combining unreleased footage from Dylan's 1980 tours with new material written by Lucy Sante and performed by Academy Award nominee Michael Shannon, plus over 28 minutes of extras. The documentary premiered at the 2017 New York Film Festival.

== Track listing ==
=== Standard two-disc edition ===
All tracks are written by Bob Dylan, except where noted.

Disc one – live
No.	Title	Recorded	Length
1.	"Slow Train"	November 16, 1979 (Warfield Theatre, San Francisco)	6:20
2.	"Gotta Serve Somebody"	November 15, 1979 (Warfield Theatre, San Francisco)	6:29
3.	"I Believe in You"	May 16, 1980 (Stanley Theatre, Pittsburgh)	4:51
4.	"When You Gonna Wake Up?"	July 9, 1981 (Drammenshallen, Drammen, Norway)	5:27
5.	"When He Returns"	December 5, 1979 (Kiva Auditorium, Albuquerque)	5:00
6.	"Man Gave Names to All the Animals"	January 16, 1980 (Paramount Theatre, Portland)	5:45
7.	"Precious Angel"	November 16, 1979 (Warfield Theatre, San Francisco)	5:40
8.	"Covenant Woman"	November 20, 1979 (Civic Auditorium, Santa Monica)	5:52
9.	"Gonna Change My Way of Thinking"	January 31, 1980 (Orpheum Theater, Memphis)	4:46
10.	"Do Right to Me Baby (Do Unto Others)"	January 28, 1980 (Uptown Theater, Kansas City)	5:08
11.	"Solid Rock"	November 27, 1979 (Golden Hall, San Diego)	4:42
12.	"What Can I Do for You?"	November 27, 1979 (Golden Hall, San Diego)	5:53
13.	"Saved"	January 12, 1980, (Paramount Theatre, Portland)	4:49
14.	"In the Garden"	January 27, 1980 (Uptown Theatre, Kansas City)	6:33
Total length:			77:15

Disc two – live
No.	Title	Recorded	Length
1.	"Slow Train"	June 29, 1981 (Earl's Court, London)	4:35
2.	"Ain't Gonna Go to Hell for Anybody"	April 24, 1980 (Théâtre Saint-Denis, Montreal)	4:30
3.	"Gotta Serve Somebody"	July 15, 1981 (Freilichttheater, Bad Segeberg, West Germany)	3:57
4.	"Ain't No Man Righteous, No Not One"	November 16, 1979 (Warfield Theatre, San Francisco)	4:35
5.	"Saving Grace"	November 6, 1979 (Warfield Theatre, San Francisco)	4:25
6.	"Blessed Is the Name"	November 20, 1979 (Civic Auditorium, Santa Monica)	4:18
7.	"Solid Rock"	October 23, 1981 (The Spectrum, Philadelphia)	4:20
8.	"Are You Ready?"	April 30, 1980 (Kleinhans Music Hall, Buffalo)	6:19
9.	"Pressing On"	November 6, 1979 (Warfield Theatre, San Francisco)	6:52
10.	"Shot of Love"	July 25, 1981 (Palace des Sports, Avignon, France)	4:45
11.	"Dead Man, Dead Man"	June 21, 1981 (Stade des Minimes, Toulouse, France)	4:22
12.	"Watered-Down Love"	June 12, 1981 (Pine Knob Music Theatre, Clarkston)	4:44
13.	"In the Summertime"	October 21, 1981 (Orpheum Theatre, Boston)	3:15
14.	"The Groom's Still Waiting at the Altar"	November 13, 1980 (Warfield Theatre, San Francisco)	6:01
15.	"Caribbean Wind"	November 12, 1980 (Warfield Theatre, San Francisco)	5:23
16.	"Every Grain of Sand"	November 21, 1981 (Civic Center Theatre, Lakeland)	3:42
Total length:			76:03

=== Deluxe Edition bonus discs ===
Disc three – rare and unreleased
No.	Title	Writer(s)	Recorded	Length
1.	"Slow Train" (soundcheck)		October 5, 1978	3:03
2.	"Do Right to Me Baby (Do Unto Others)" (soundcheck)		December 7, 1978	3:38
3.	"Help Me Understand" (soundcheck)	Hank Williams	October 5, 1978	2:41
4.	"Gonna Change My Way of Thinking" (rehearsal with horns)		October 2, 1979	4:58
5.	"Gotta Serve Somebody" (take 1)		May 4, 1979	5:41
6.	"When He Returns" (take 2)		May 4, 1979	4:23
7.	"Ain't No Man Righteous, No Not One" (take 6)		May 1, 1979	4:59
8.	"Trouble in Mind" (take 1)		April 30, 1979	4:50
9.	"Ye Shall Be Changed" (outtake)		May 2, 1979	4:08
10.	"Covenant Woman" (take 3)		February 11, 1980	5:05
11.	"Stand by Faith" (rehearsal)		September 26, 1979	2:35
12.	"I Will Love Him" (live)		April 19, 1980	5:19
13.	"Jesus Is the One" (live)		July 17, 1981	2:46
14.	"City of Gold" (live)		November 22, 1980	2:48
15.	"Thief on the Cross" (live)		November 10, 1981	4:05
16.	"Pressing On" (take 1)		February 13, 1980	5:50
Total length:				66:49

Disc four – rare and unreleased
No.	Title	Recorded	Length
1.	"Slow Train" (rehearsal with horns)	October 2, 1979	5:37
2.	"Gotta Serve Somebody" (rehearsal with horns)	October 9, 1979	4:35
3.	"Making a Liar Out of Me" (rehearsal)	September 26, 1980	5:44
4.	"Yonder Comes Sin" (rehearsal)	October 1, 1980	4:11
5.	"Radio Spot for January 1980, Portland, OR show"		1:00
6.	"Cover Down, Pray Through" (live)	May 1, 1980	4:20
7.	"Rise Again" (rehearsal)	October 16, 1980	3:03
8.	"Ain't Gonna Go to Hell for Anybody" (live)	December 2, 1980	3:51
9.	"The Groom's Still Waiting at the Altar" (take 2)	May 1, 1981	5:26
10.	"Caribbean Wind" (rehearsal with pedal steel)	September 23, 1980	5:58
11.	"You Changed My Life" (take 4)	April 23, 1981	4:31
12.	"Shot of Love" (outtake)	March 25, 1981	4:24
13.	"Watered-Down Love" (outtake)	May 15, 1981	4:16
14.	"Dead Man, Dead Man" (outtake)	April 24, 1981	7:22
15.	"Every Grain of Sand" (rehearsal)	September 26, 1980	4:49
Total length:			69:07

Disc five – 'Best of' Live in Toronto 1980
No.	Title	Length
1.	"Gotta Serve Somebody"	6:53
2.	"I Believe in You"	4:44
3.	"Covenant Woman"	6:08
4.	"When You Gonna Wake Up?"	5:41
5.	"When He Returns"	5:25
6.	"Ain't Gonna Go to Hell for Anybody" (Unreleased song)	4:15
7.	"Cover Down, Pray Through" (Unreleased song)	4:33
8.	"Man Gave Names to All the Animals"	5:40
9.	"Precious Angel"	5:24
Total length:		48:43

Disc six – 'Best of' Live in Toronto 1980
No.	Title	Length
1.	"Slow Train"	6:49
2.	"Do Right to Me Baby (Do Unto Others)"	4:43
3.	"Solid Rock"	4:49
4.	"Saving Grace"	4:42
5.	"What Can I Do for You?"	6:33
6.	"In the Garden"	6:18
7.	"Band Introductions"	2:05
8.	"Are You Ready?"	4:29
9.	"Pressing On"	5:26
Total length:		45:54

Disc seven – Live at Earls Court, London, June 27, 1981
No.	Title	Length
1.	"Gotta Serve Somebody"	4:30
2.	"I Believe in You"	4:57
3.	"Like a Rolling Stone"	6:25
4.	"Man Gave Names to All the Animals"	4:48
5.	"Maggie's Farm"	4:07
6.	"I Don't Believe You (She Acts Like We Never Have Met)"	3:46
7.	"Dead Man, Dead Man"	4:54
8.	"Girl from the North Country"	5:10
9.	"Ballad of a Thin Man"	3:26
Total length:		42:03

Disc eight – Live at Earls Court, London, June 27, 1981
No.	Title	Writer(s)	Length
1.	"Slow Train"		4:52
2.	"Let's Begin"	Jimmy Webb	3:26
3.	"Lenny Bruce"		4:30
4.	"Mr. Tambourine Man"		5:15
5.	"Solid Rock"		4:32
6.	"Just Like a Woman"		3:51
7.	"Watered-Down Love"		4:51
8.	"Forever Young"		4:15
9.	"When You Gonna Wake Up?"		4:49
10.	"In the Garden"		5:48
11.	"Band Introductions"		4:05
12.	"Blowin' in the Wind"		5:00
13.	"It's All Over Now, Baby Blue"		5:00
14.	"Knockin' on Heaven's Door"		5:01
Total length:			65:15

Disc nine – Bonus DVD
No.	Title	Length
1.	"Trouble No More – A Musical Film"	58:56
2.	"DVD EXTRAS: Shot of Love; Cover Down, Pray Through; Jesus Met the Woman at the Well (Alternate version); Ain't Gonna Go to Hell for Anybody (Complete version); Precious Angel (Complete version); Slow Train (Complete version)"	28:17
Total length:		87:13

=== Limited Edition exclusive bonus two-disc set ===
Disc ten – Live in San Diego 1979
No.	Title	Length
1.	"Gotta Serve Somebody"	6:50
2.	"I Believe in You"	4:46
3.	"When You Gonna Wake Up?"	5:45
4.	"When He Returns"	5:02
5.	"Man Gave Names to All the Animals"	5:29
6.	"Precious Angel"	5:43
7.	"Slow Train"	6:38
8.	"Covenant Woman"	5:51
Total length:		46:21

Disc eleven – Live in San Diego 1979
No.	Title	Length
1.	"Gonna Change My Way of Thinking"	5:03
2.	"Do Right to Me Baby (Do Unto Others)"	4:29
3.	"Solid Rock"	4:29
4.	"Saving Grace"	4:46
5.	"Saved"	4:30
6.	"What Can I Do for You?"	5:52
7.	"In the Garden" (from November 27)	6:26
8.	"Band introduction"	1:01
9.	"Blessed Be the Name"	3:45
10.	"Pressing On"	6:31
11.	"In the Garden" (incomplete, from November 28)	6:11
Total length:		53:28

=== Vinyl Edition ===
LP One, Side A
No.	Title	Version	Length
1.	"Slow Train"	Live, November 16, 1979, The Warfield Theatre, San Francisco, California, United States	6:20
2.	"Gotta Serve Somebody"	Live, November 15, 1979, The Warfield Theatre, San Francisco, California, United States	6:29
3.	"I Believe in You"	Live, May 16, 1980, Stanley Theatre, Pittsburgh, Pennsylvania, United States	4:51
Total length:			17:40

LP One, Side B
No.	Title	Version	Length
1.	"When You Gonna Wake Up?"	Live July 9, 1981, Drammenshallen, Drammen, Norway	5:27
2.	"When He Returns"	Live December 5, 1979, Kiva Auditorium, Albuquerque, New Mexico, United States	5:00
3.	"Man Gave Names to All the Animals"	Live, January 16, 1980, Paramount Theatre, Portland, Oregon, United States	5:45
4.	"Precious Angel"	Live November 16, 1979, at The Warfield Theatre, San Francisco, California, United States	5:40
Total length:			21:52

LP Two, Side C
No.	Title	Version	Length
1.	"Covenant Woman"	Live, November 20, 1979, Civic Auditorium, Santa Monica, California, United States	5:52
2.	"Gonna Change My Way of Thinking"	Live, January 31, 1980, Orpheum Theater, Memphis, Tennessee, United States	4:46
3.	"Do Right to Me Baby (Do Unto Others)"	Live, January 28, 1980, Uptown Theatre, Kansas City, Missouri, United States	5:08
4.	"Solid Rock"	Live, November 27, 1979, Golden Hall, San Diego, California, United States	4:42
Total length:			20:28

LP Two, Side D
No.	Title	Version	Length
1.	"What Can I Do for You?"	Live, November 27, 1979, Golden Hall, San Diego, California, United States	5:53
2.	"Saved"	Live, January 12, 1980, Paramount Theatre, Portland, Oregon, United States	4:49
3.	"In the Garden"	Live, January 27, 1980, Uptown Theatre, Kansas City, Missouri, United States	6:33
Total length:			17:15

LP Three, Side E
No.	Title	Version	Length
1.	"Slow Train"	Live, June 29, 1981, Earls Court, London, England	4:35
2.	"Ain't Gonna Go to Hell for Anybody" (Previously unreleased song)	Live, April 24, 1980, Le Theatre Saint-Denis, Montreal, Quebec, Canada	4:30
3.	"Gotta Serve Somebody"	Live, June 27, 1981, Earls Court, London, England	3:57
4.	"Ain't No Man Righteous, No Not One" (Previously unreleased song)	Live November 16, 1979, at The Warfield Theatre, San Francisco, California, United States	4:35
Total length:			17:37

LP Three, Side F
No.	Title	Version	Length
1.	"Saving Grace"	Live November 6, 1979, at The Warfield Theatre, San Francisco, California, United States	4:25
2.	"Blessed Is the Name" (Previously unreleased song)	Live, November 20, 1979, Civic Auditorium, Santa Monica, California, United States	4:18
3.	"Solid Rock"	Live, October 23, 1981, The Spectrum, Philadelphia, Pennsylvania, United States	4:20
4.	"Are You Ready?"	Live, April 30, 1980, Kleinhans Music Hall, Buffalo, New York, United States	6:19
Total length:			19:22

LP Four, Side G
No.	Title	Version	Length
1.	"Pressing On"	Live November 6, 1979, at The Warfield Theatre, San Francisco, California, United States	6:52
2.	"Shot of Love"	Live July 25, 1981, at Palace des Sports, Avignon, France	4:45
3.	"Dead Man, Dead Man"	Live June 21, 1981, at Stade Municipal des Minimes, Toulouse, France	4:22
Total length:			15:59

LP Four, Side H
No.	Title	Version	Length
1.	"Watered-Down Love"	Live June 12, 1981, at Pine Knob Music Theatre, Clarkston, Michigan, United States	4:44
2.	"In the Summertime"	Live October 21, 1981, at The Orpheum Theatre, Boston, Massachusetts, United States	3:15
3.	"The Groom's Still Waiting at the Altar"	Live November 13, 1980, at The Warfield Theatre, San Francisco, California, United States	6:01
4.	"Caribbean Wind"	Live November 12, 1980, at The Warfield Theatre, San Francisco, California, United States	5:23
5.	"Every Grain of Sand"	Live November 21, 1981, at Civic Center Theatre, Lakeland, Florida, United States	3:42
Total length:			23:05

== Collective personnel ==
- Bob Dylan — vocals, guitars, harmonica, piano
- Al Kooper, Spooner Oldham, William "Smitty" Smith, Terry Young, Alan Pasqua – keyboards
- Steve Ripley, Carlos Santana, Fred Tackett, Steven Soles, Billy Cross — guitars
- Tim Drummond, Jerry Scheff — bass
- Jim Keltner, Arthur Rosato, Ian Wallace – drums
- Mary Elizabeth Bridges, Carolyn Dennis, Gwen Evans, Clydie King, Regina McCrary, Regina Peebles, Helena Springs, Mona Lisa Young, Debi Dye, Jo Ann Harris – backing vocals, percussion
- Steve Douglas - tenor saxophone
- Bobbye Hall - percussion
- David Mansfield - violin, mandolin

== Charts ==
Chart (2017)	Peak position
Australian Albums (ARIA)	70
Austrian Albums (Ö3 Austria)	14
Belgian Albums (Ultratop Flanders)	11
Belgian Albums (Ultratop Wallonia)	61
Canadian Albums (Billboard)	93
Dutch Albums (Album Top 100)	9
French Albums (SNEP)	121
German Albums (Offizielle Top 100)	10
Irish Albums (IRMA)	14
Italian Albums (FIMI)	36
New Zealand Heatseeker Albums (RMNZ)	3
Norwegian Albums (VG-lista)	8
Scottish Albums (Official Charts)	13
Spanish Albums (PROMUSICAE)	15
Swedish Albums (Sverigetopplistan)	7
Swiss Albums (Schweizer Hitparade)	17
UK Albums (Official Charts)	21
US Billboard 200	49

== See also ==
- Bob Dylan bootleg recordings
