= Bob Dylan: The Collection =

Bob Dylan: the Collection

Compilation album by Bob Dylan
- Released: August 29, 2006
- Recorded: 1961–2007 at multiple locations
- Genres: Country; folk; folk rock; rock
- Length: 3391:41
- Language: English
- Producers: Barry Beckett; Stan Berkowitz; Robert Blackwell; Gordon Carroll; Rick Danko; Don DeVito; Bruce Dickinson; Bob Dylan; Rob Fraboni; Debbie Gold; John H. Hammond; Levon Helm; Garth Hudson; Glyn Johns; Bob Johnston; Mark Knopfler; Daniel Lanois; Richard Manuel; Brendan O'Brien; Chuck Plotkin; Robbie Robertson; Jeff Rosen; Leon Russell; Martin Scorsese; David Was; Don Was; Jerry Wexler; Tom Wilson

Bob Dylan chronology
| Modern Times (2006) | Bob Dylan: the Collection (2006) | Dylan (2007) |

Bob Dylan: the Collection is the third iTunes complete digital album, following The Complete U2 and The Complete Stevie Wonder. It includes 773 songs and a 100-page digital booklet.

== Track listing ==
| Disc Number | Title | Type | Number of songs | Total Time |
|---|---|---|---|---|
| 1 | Bob Dylan | Studio | 13 | 36:33 |
| 2 | The Freewheelin' Bob Dylan | Studio | 13 | 49:43 |
| 3 | The Times They Are a-Changin' | Studio | 10 | 45:06 |
| 4 | Another Side of Bob Dylan | Studio | 11 | 50:50 |
| 5 | Bringing It All Back Home | Studio | 11 | 46:50 |
| 6 | Highway 61 Revisited | Studio | 9 | 51:04 |
| 7 | Blonde on Blonde | Studio | 14 | 1:12:33 |
| 8 | Bob Dylan's Greatest Hits | Compilation | 10 | 40:01 |
| 9 | John Wesley Harding | Studio | 12 | 38:20 |
| 10 | Nashville Skyline | Studio | 10 | 26:51 |
| 11 | Self Portrait | Studio | 24 | 1:13:15 |
| 12 | New Morning | Studio | 12 | 35:22 |
| 13,14 | Bob Dylan's Greatest Hits Vol. II | Compilation | 21 | 1:17:8 |
| 15 | Pat Garrett & Billy the Kid | Soundtrack | 10 | 34:58 |
| 16 | Dylan | Compilation | 9 | 33:15 |
| 17 | Planet Waves | Studio | 11 | 41:56 |
| 18,19 | Before the Flood | Live | 21 | 1:26:08 |
| 20 | Blood on the Tracks | Studio | 10 | 51:32 |
| 21,22 | The Basement Tapes | Studio | 24 | 1:1:45 |
| 23 | Desire | Studio | 9 | 56:08 |
| 24 | Hard Rain | Live | 9 | 51:16 |
| 25 | Street Legal | Studio | 9 | 50:10 |
| 26, 27 | Bob Dylan at Budokan | Live | 22 | 1:39:40 |
| 28 | Slow Train Coming | Studio | 9 | 46:48 |
| 29 | Saved | Studio | 9 | 42:37 |
| 30 | Shot of Love | Studio | 10 | 44:20 |
| 31 | Infidels | Studio | 8 | 42:01 |
| 32 | Real Live | Live | 10 | 52:14 |
| 33 | Empire Burlesque | Studio | 10 | 46:42 |
| 34, 35, 36 | Biograph | Compilation | 53 | 3:35:28 |
| 37 | Knocked Out Loaded | Studio | 8 | 35:11 |
| 38 | Dylan & The Dead | Live | 7 | 44:02 |
| 39 | Down in the Groove | Studio | 10 | 31: 58 |
| 40 | Oh Mercy | Studio | 10 | 38:58 |
| 41 | Under the Red Sky | Studio | 10 | 35:25 |
| 42, 43, 44 | The Bootleg Series, Vol. 1 (Rare & Unreleased) (1961-1991) | Compilation | 58 | 3:49:40 |
| 45 | Good as I Been to You | Studio | 13 | 55:07 |
| 46 | The 30th Anniversary Concert Celebration | Live | 4 | 21:51 |
| 47 | World Gone Wrong | Studio | 10 | 53:56 |
| 48 | Bob Dylan's Greatest Hits Volume 3 | Compilation | 14 | 1:17:04 |
| 49 | MTV Unplugged | Live | 11 | 1:04:09 |
| 50 | Time Out of Mind | Studio | 11 | 1:12:36 |
| 51, 52 | The Bootleg Series Vol. 4: Bob Dylan Live 1966, The "Royal Albert Hall" Concert | Live | 15 | 1:29:54 |
| 53, 54 | The Essential Bob Dylan | Compilation | 30 | 2:03:43 |
| 55 | "Love and Theft" | Studio | 12 | 57:27 |
| 56, 57 | The Bootleg Series Vol. 5: Bob Dylan Live 1975, The Rolling Thunder Revue | Live | 22 | 1:41:55 |
| 58, 59 | The Bootleg Series Vol. 6: Bob Dylan Live 1964, Concert at Philharmonic Hall | Live | 19 | 1:33:36 |
| 60, 61 | The Bootleg Series Vol. 7: No Direction Home: The Soundtrack | Compilation | 28 | 2:20:57 |
| 62 | The Best of Bob Dylan | Compilation | 16 | 1:19:44 |
| 63 | Modern Times | Studio | 10 | 1:02:42 |
| 64 | Rare Tracks from the Vaults | Compilation (Bonus tracks on iTunes) | 42 | 3:01:12 |
