= The Complete Budokan 1978 =

Live album box set by Bob Dylan
- Released: November 17, 2023
- Recorded: February 28–March 1, 1978
- Venue: Nippon Budokan
- Length: 269:12
- Labels: Columbia; Legacy

Bob Dylan chronology
Shadow Kingdom (2023)	The Complete Budokan 1978 (2023)	The 1974 Live Recordings (2024)

The Complete Budokan 1978 is a box set of 1978 live recordings by Bob Dylan, released on November 17, 2023, through Columbia Records and Legacy Recordings.

== Background and packaging ==
Recorded on February 28 and March 1, 1978, the concerts took place at the Nippon Budokan, Tokyo as a multi-show kickoff of his 1978 world tour. The recording features audio from the shows for the live album Bob Dylan at Budokan (1978). The collection features a set of four discs with all the songs, all restored, remixed, and remastered, played on the two nights at the Budokan. A vinyl release entitled Another Budokan was issued at the same time with only the previously unissued tracks.

== Critical reception ==
Professional ratings
Aggregate scores
Source	Rating
Metacritic	79/100
Review scores
Source	Rating
Classic Rock	3.5/5 stars
Exclaim!	8/10
Mojo	4/5 stars
Pitchfork	6.1/10
Uncut	4/5 stars

At Metacritic, which assigns a normalized rating out of 100 to reviews from professional critics, the album received an average score of 79 based on eight reviews, indicating "universal acclaim". Vish Khanna of Exclaim! opined that the album is proof that "less is more" does not necessarily apply here as "the whole story can in fact be worth more than selected excerpts". Khanna concluded that the concert captures the "first experiential glimmer" of Dylan "as a lost seeker" that is testing "new ideas" as well as "his audience".

Pat Carty at Classic Rock drew comparisons with Elvis in Vegas for containing "dense, big-band arrangements". Carty thought that the release was "much improved from the original", citing highlights such as "I Threw It All Away" and "Just Like a Woman". While it may not "convert Dylan doubters", it should be an "interesting curio all the same". Stephen Thomas Erlewine at Pitchfork thought the album represents Dylan's "latter-day incarnation as a restless and mercurial road warrior" but cannot hide the fact that the album is "just a drag" and feels "often dorky, too". The artist trying to entertain "just winds up as enervation".

== Track listing ==
All tracks were recorded at the Nippon Budokan Hall in Tokyo, with all tracks on discs 1 and 2 recorded on February 28, 1978, and all tracks on discs 3 and 4 recorded on March 1, 1978.

All tracks are written by Bob Dylan, except where noted.

Disc one
No.	Title	Writer(s)	Length
1.	"A Hard Rain's a-Gonna Fall"		4:32
2.	"Repossession Blues"	Roland James	2:49
3.	"Mr. Tambourine Man"		5:26
4.	"I Threw It All Away"		5:25
5.	"Shelter from the Storm"		4:44
6.	"Love Minus Zero/No Limit"		4:16
7.	"Girl from the North Country"		5:02
8.	"Ballad of a Thin Man"		4:44
9.	"Maggie's Farm"		5:04
10.	"To Ramona"		4:40
11.	"Like a Rolling Stone"		6:33
12.	"I Shall Be Released"		4:28
13.	"Is Your Love in Vain?"		5:00
14.	"Going, Going, Gone"		4:03
Total length:			66:46

Disc two
No.	Title	Writer(s)	Length
1.	"One of Us Must Know (Sooner or Later)"		4:32
2.	"Blowin' in the Wind"		4:31
3.	"Just Like a Woman"		5:02
4.	"Oh, Sister"	Bob Dylan, Jacques Levy	4:40
5.	"Simple Twist of Fate"		4:16
6.	"You're a Big Girl Now"		5:32
7.	"All Along the Watchtower"		4:13
8.	"I Want You"		2:31
9.	"All I Really Want to Do"		3:57
10.	"Tomorrow Is a Long Time"		4:23
11.	"Don't Think Twice, It's All Right"		5:08
12.	"Band Introductions"		2:40
13.	"It's Alright, Ma (I'm Only Bleeding)"		6:34
14.	"Forever Young"		7:18
15.	"The Times They Are A-Changin'"		5:02
Total length:			70:19

Disc three
No.	Title	Writer(s)	Length
1.	"A Hard Rain's A-Gonna Fall"		4:05
2.	"Love Her with a Feeling"	Tampa Red	2:52
3.	"Mr. Tambourine Man"		5:04
4.	"I Threw It All Away"		5:17
5.	"Love Minus Zero / No Limit"		4:05
6.	"Shelter from the Storm"		4:51
7.	"Girl from the North Country"		4:17
8.	"Ballad of a Thin Man"		4:48
9.	"Maggie's Farm"		5:31
10.	"One More Cup of Coffee (Valley Below)"		3:28
11.	"Like a Rolling Stone"		6:50
12.	"I Shall Be Released"		4:23
13.	"Is Your Love in Vain?"		4:14
14.	"Going, Going, Gone"		4:04
Total length:			63:49

Disc four
No.	Title	Writer(s)	Length
1.	"One of Us Must Know (Sooner or Later)"		4:44
2.	"Blowin' in the Wind"		4:35
3.	"Just Like a Woman"		5:06
4.	"Oh, Sister"	Dylan, Levy	4:57
5.	"I Don't Believe You (She Acts Like We Never Have Met)"		4:23
6.	"You're a Big Girl Now"		4:58
7.	"All Along the Watchtower"		3:27
8.	"I Want You"		2:43
9.	"All I Really Want to Do"		3:49
10.	"Knockin' On Heaven's Door"		4:09
11.	"The Man In Me"		3:51
12.	"Band Introductions"		1:56
13.	"It's Alright, Ma (I'm Only Bleeding)"		6:39
14.	"Forever Young"		7:50
15.	"The Times They Are A-Changin'"		5:12
Total length:			68:18

== Charts ==
Chart performance for The Complete Budokan 1978
Chart (2023)	Peak position
Belgian Albums (Ultratop Flanders)	49
Japanese Albums (Oricon)	22
Japanese Hot Albums (Billboard Japan)	20
Scottish Albums (Official Charts)	22
Spanish Albums (Promusicae)	76
UK Album Downloads (Official Charts)	6
