= Carol Dennis =

Carol Dennis may refer to:

- Carolyn Dennis (born 1954), sometimes known professionally as Carol Dennis, American singer
- Carol L. Dennis (born 1938), author, editor, and teacher
