= Clydie King =

American singer (1943–2019)

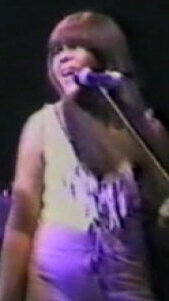
- King in 1981

Background information
- Also known as: Brown Sugar
- Born: Clydie Mae King; August 21, 1943; Dallas, Texas, U.S.
- Died: January 7, 2019 (aged 75) Monrovia, California, U.S.
- Occupation: Singer
- Years active: 1956–1984
- Labels: Specialty; Kent
- Formerly of: The Raelettes; The Blackberries

Clydie Mae King (August 21, 1943 – January 7, 2019) was an American singer, best known for her session work as a backing vocalist. King also recorded solo under her name. In the 1970s, she recorded as Brown Sugar, and her single "Loneliness (Will Bring Us Together Again)" reached No. 44 on the Billboard R&B charts in 1973.

== Early life and career ==
King was born in Dallas, Texas on August 21, 1943. At the time of King's death, the media reported that her parents, Lula Mae King and Curtis Crittendon, had raised her after her mother's 1945 death. A 1950 census record lists King as the child of Tom and Genevieve King. She was reported as Curtis's sister-in-law, with Lula born to the same parents. After starting to sing in the local church, King moved with her family to Los Angeles, where she graduated from Fremont High School in 1961.

Discovered by songwriter Richard Berry, King began her recording career in 1956 with Little Clydie and the Teens. She contributed to early 1960s recordings by producer Phil Spector, such as "River Deep – Mountain High", and was a member of Ray Charles' Raelettes from 1965 to 1968. She recorded solo singles for Specialty Records, Kent Records and others. Her 1971 solo single "'Bout Love" reached No. 45 on the R&B chart. Reviewing her 1972 debut album Direct Me, Robert Christgau wrote in Christgau's Record Guide: Rock Albums of the Seventies (1981): "Clydie has a voice that's more sly Diana than robust Martha and addresses the title plea to Gabriel Mekler, who (this time, anyway) proves neither as sly nor as robust as Berry Gordy."

King provided backing vocals for Humble Pie, which had great success in the United States, and she went on to become an in-demand session singer, worked with Venetta Fields and Sherlie Matthews and recorded with B.B. King, The Rolling Stones, Steely Dan, Barbra Streisand, Bob Dylan, Linda Ronstadt, Joe Cocker, Dickey Betts, Joe Walsh, and many others. She was a member of The Blackberries with Fields and Matthews and sang on Joe Cocker's Mad Dogs and Englishmen tour, which became a feature film. In 1971, she was featured on the Beaver and Krause album Gandarva. She sang the lead vocal on the gospel-inflected "Walkin' by the River", on which Ray Brown played bass. Along with Merry Clayton, she sang the background vocals on Lynyrd Skynyrd's seminal hit "Sweet Home Alabama".

== Personal life ==
King was married multiple times. She married Robin Hale on November 10, 1960, and with him, had three sons: Christopher, Randy, and Magge Hale. King and Hale divorced in August of 1969. A subsequent husband was Tony Collins, with whom she had a daughter, Delores Collins.

In 1998, newspapers reported that Bob Dylan's girlfriend at the time, Susan Ross, had stated that Dylan had been secretly married to Clydie King and had two children by her. Ross also stated that he had had long-term relationships with other backing vocalists including Helena Springs, Carol Woods and Carol Dennis.

== Death ==
King died on January 7, 2019, in a Monrovia, California hospital at the age of 75 from complications of a blood infection.

== Discography ==
=== Singles ===
- 1956 Little Clydie & The Teens: "A Casual Look" / "Oh Me" (RPM 462)
- 1957 Clydie King: "Our Romance" / "Written On The Wall" (Specialty 605)
- 1958 Clydie King: "I'm Invited To Your Party" / "Young Foolish Love" (Specialty 642)
- 1960 The Meadowlarks: "There's A Girl" / "Blue Mood" (Original Sound 12)
- 1961 The Meadowlarks: "It's Stompin' Time (Part 1)" / "It's Stompin' Time (Part 2)" (Interlude 101)
- 1962 Clydie King & The Sweet Things: "The Boys In My Life" / "Promises" (Philips 40001)
- 1962 Clydie King & Mel Carter: "Who Do You Love" / "The Wrong Side Of Town" (Philips 40049)
- 1962 Clydie King: "Turn Around" / "Don't Hang Up The Phone" (Philips 40051)
- 1963 Clydie King and The Sweet Things: "Only The Guilty Cry" / "By Now" (Philips 40107)
- 1965 Bonnie & The Treasures: "Home Of The Brave" / "Our Song" (Phi-Dan 5005)
- 1965 Clydie King: "The Thrill Is Gone" / "If You Were A Man" (Imperial 66109)
- 1965 Clydie King: "Missin' My Baby" / "My Love Grows Deeper" (Imperial 66139)
- 1966 Clydie King: "He Always Comes Back To Me" / "Soft and Gentle Ways" (Imperial 66172)
- 1967 Jimmy Holiday and Clydie King: "Ready, Willing and Able" / "We Got a Good Thing Goin'" (Minit 32021)
- 1967 Clydie King: "One Of Those Good For Cryin' Over You Days" / "My Mistakes Of Yesterday" (Minit 32025)
- 1967 Clydie King: "I'll Never Stop Loving You" / "Shing-A-Ling" (Minit 32032)
- 1969 Clydie King: "Love Now, Pay Later" / "One Part, Two Part" (Minit 32054)
- 1969 The Brothers and Sisters of Los Angeles: "The Mighty Quinn" / "Chimes of Freedom" (Ode 121)
- 1969 The Brothers and Sisters of Los Angeles: "The Times They Are A-Changin'" / "Mr. Tambourine Man" (Ode 123)
- 1970 Clydie King: "Never Like This Before" / "The Long and Winding Road" (Lizard 21005)
- 1971 Clydie King: "'Bout Love" / "First Time, Last Time" (Lizard 21007)
- 1972 Barry Goldberg & Clydie King: "Mockingbird"" / "Jackson Highway" (Reprise 1120)
- 1972 Brown Sugar: "Somebody Stronger" / "One Way Street Called Love" (Abkco 5001)
- 1972 The Blackberries: "Somebody Up There" / "But I Love Him" (Mowest 5020)
- 1973 The Blackberries: "Don't Change On Me" / "Twist and Shout" (A & M 1442)
- 1973 Brown Sugar: "Don't Hold Back" / "Loneliness (Will Bring Us Together Again)" (Bullet 711)
- 1973 Brown Sugar: "Don't Hold Back" / "Loneliness (Will Bring Us Together Again)" (Chelsea 78–0125)
- 1973 Brown Sugar: "Sugar, Didn't I" / "Moonlight and Taming You" (RCA APBO-0149)
- 1974 Clydie King & Brown Sugar: "Dance To The Music" / "Love Can Bring You Down" (RCA APBO-0239)
- 1974 The Blackberries: "Life Is Full Of Joy" / "Yesterday's Music" (A & M 1630)
- 1975 Clydie King: "Punish Me" / "Punish Me" (instrumental) (U.K. 2801)
- 1977 Clydie King: "Streets Full Of Flowers" / "Streets Full Of Flowers" (instrumental) (Whisper WX 2345)

=== Albums ===
- 1972 Clydie King: Direct Me (Lizard / Ampex Records, A-20104)
- 1973 Brown Sugar: Brown Sugar featuring Clydie King (Chelsea Records, BCL1-0368)
- 1976 Clydie King: Rushing to Meet You (Tiger Lily Records, TL 14037)
- 2007 Clydie King: The Imperial & Minit Years (Stateside Records, 5099950958122)

=== As backing vocalist (selected) ===
- Ray Charles: It's a Blues Thing 1995 – King sang "Ode to Billie Joe" rec. 1968
- Diana Ross and the Supremes: "No Matter What Sign You Are" 1969
- Ray Charles: Love Country Style 1970 – duet on "Sweet Memories"
- Crabby Appleton: Rotten to the Core 1971
- The Supremes: "Nathan Jones" 1971
- Beaver and Krause: "Walkin' By the River" on Gandarva 1971
- Martha Reeves and the Vandellas: "Bless You" 1971
- Madura: Madura II 1973
- Dickey Betts: Atlanta's Burning Down 1978
- Neil Diamond: Tap Root Manuscript 1970 – backing vocals to "Childsong" and "Missa"
- Bob Dylan: Saved 1980, Shot of Love 1981, Infidels 1983, Biograph 1985, Down in the Groove 1988, The Bootleg Series Volumes 1–3 (Rare & Unreleased) 1961–1991 1991, The Bootleg Series Vol. 13: Trouble No More 1979–1981 2017
- Chuck Girard: Take It Easy 1979
- Humble Pie: Eat It 1973
- Elton John: Caribou 1974
- B.B. King: Indianola Mississippi Seeds 1970 – Angelic Chorus on "Hummingbird"
- Gary St. Clair: Gary St. Clair 1971
- Lynyrd Skynyrd: "Sweet Home Alabama" 1974
- Martha Reeves: Martha Reeves, Produced by Richard Perry 1974
- The Rolling Stones: Exile on Main St. 1972
- The Doors: Full Circle 1972
- Linda Ronstadt: Don't Cry Now 1973, Heart Like A Wheel 1974
- Diana Ross: Baby It's Me 1977
- Dusty Springfield: Cameo 1973
- Steely Dan: Can't Buy A Thrill 1972, The Royal Scam 1976, Aja 1977
- Jean Terrell: I Had to Fall in Love 1978
- Joe Walsh: The Smoker You Drink, the Player You Get 1973
- Barbra Streisand: A Star Is Born – backup vocals with Venetta Fields as The Oreos 1976
- B.W. Stevenson: "My Maria" 1973 - backup vocals with Bill & Taffy Danoff, Daniel J. Moore*, Lorna Willard, Venetta Fields
