= Bob Dylan World Tour 1978 =

1978 concert tour by Bob Dylan

- World tour by Bob Dylan
- Poster to the concerts in Dortmund, West Germany
- Location: Asia; Oceania; North America; Europe
- Start date: February 20, 1978
- End date: December 18, 1978
- Legs: 4
- No. of shows: 114

Bob Dylan concert chronology
- Rolling Thunder Revue (1975–76); World Tour (1978); Gospel Tour (1979–80)

The Bob Dylan World Tour 1978 was a concert tour by American singer-songwriter Bob Dylan. In 1978, Dylan embarked on a year-long world tour, performing 114 shows in Asia, Oceania, North America and Europe, to a total audience of two million people.

== Background ==
For the tour, Dylan assembled an eight-piece band, and was also accompanied by three backing singers. Highlights of the European leg of the tour were Dylan's first concerts in West Germany where he had never wanted to play because of the Jews' persecution by the Nazis. However, after concerts at Dortmund and West Berlin, he performed on July 1 on the Zeppelinfeld at Nuremberg for 80,000 people. Promoter Fritz Rau had convinced him to perform in West Germany. It was the spot where Adolf Hitler had appeared prominently on his "Reichsparteitage", the party convention of the NSDAP. Dylan's stage was placed opposite to the rostrum where Hitler had given his speeches. After the concert, Bob Dylan said that it was a very special event for him, which he had marked by appearing in normal street clothes instead of the usual stage clothes. Eric Clapton, who also appeared at Nuremberg, joined him for two songs at the end of the concert. As a live album had been recorded at Budokan Hall, Tokyo, the Nuremberg concert recording was never officially released but only appeared on Bootleg recordings. Two weeks later, both artists performed again at a mass festival at the Blackbushe Aerodrome in England.

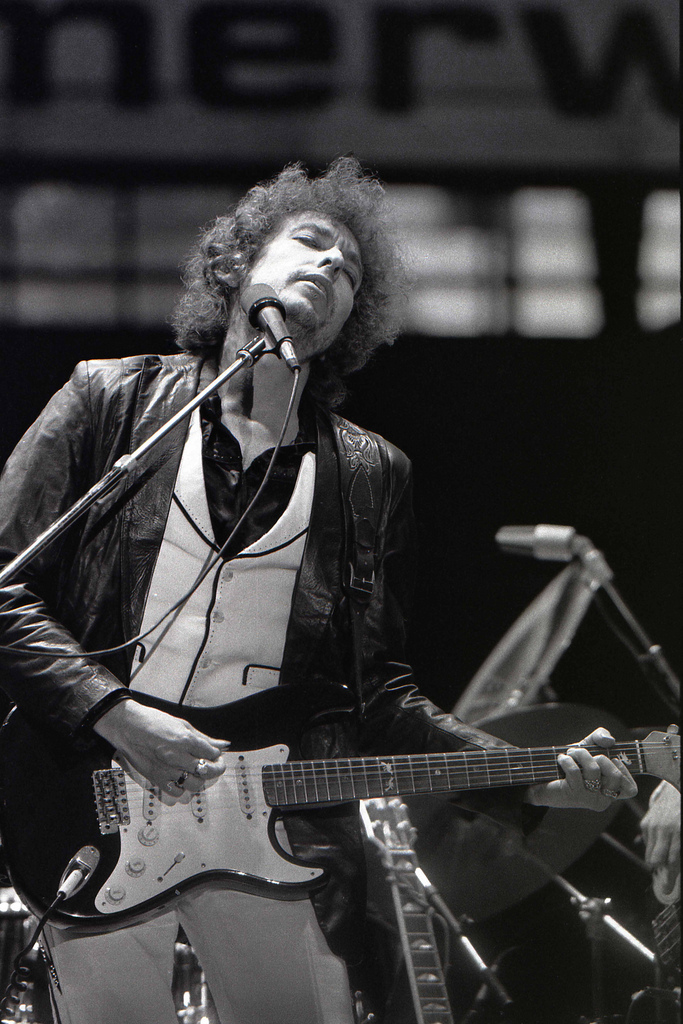
Rotterdam, Netherlands, June 23, 1978

When Dylan brought the tour to the United States in September 1978, he was dismayed the press described the look and sound of the show as a 'Las Vegas Tour', as the European concerts had been a great success. His performances at Madison Square Garden were given a good review by Rolling Stone. The 1978 tour grossed more than $20 million, and Dylan acknowledged to the Los Angeles Times that he had some debts to pay off because "I had a couple of bad years. I put a lot of money into the movie, built a big house ... and it costs a lot to get divorced in California." It was during the later stages of this tour that Dylan experienced a "born-again" conversion to Christianity, which would become the overriding thematic preoccupation in his music for the next couple of years, such as on the albums Slow Train Coming (1979) and Saved (1980).

== Releases ==
Concerts in Tokyo in February and March were recorded and released as the live double album, Bob Dylan at Budokan. Reviews were mixed. Robert Christgau awarded the album a C+ rating, giving the album a derisory review, while Janet Maslin defended it in Rolling Stone, writing: "These latest live versions of his old songs have the effect of liberating Bob Dylan from the originals."

== Set list ==
This set list is representative of the performance on November 15, 1978 in Inglewood, California. It does not represent the set list at all concerts for the duration of the tour.

1. "My Back Pages"
2. "She’s Love Crazy" Tampa Red
3. "Mr. Tambourine Man"
4. "Shelter from the Storm"
5. "It's All Over Now, Baby Blue"
6. "Tangled Up in Blue"
7. "Ballad of a Thin Man"
8. "Maggie's Farm"
9. "I Don't Believe You (She Acts Like We Never Have Met)"
10. "Like a Rolling Stone"
11. "I Shall Be Released"
12. "Senor (Tales of Yankee Power)"
13. "The Times They Are a-Changin'"
14. "Rainy Day Women ♯12 & 35"
15. "It Ain't Me Babe"
16. "Am I Your Stepchild?"
17. "One More Cup Of Coffee (Valley Below)"
18. "Blowin' in the Wind"
19. "Girl from the North Country"
20. "We Better Talk This Over"
21. "Masters of War"
22. "Just Like a Woman"
23. "To Ramona"
24. "All Along the Watchtower"
25. "All I Really Want to Do"
26. "It's Alright, Ma (I'm Only Bleeding)"
27. "Forever Young"

Encore

28. "Changing of the Guards"

== Tour dates ==
Date	City	Country	Venue	Attendance	Box Office
Asia
February 20, 1978	Tokyo	Japan	Nippon Budokan	—N/a	—N/a
February 21, 1978	Tokyo	Japan	Nippon Budokan	—N/a	—N/a
February 23, 1978	Tokyo	Japan	Nippon Budokan	—N/a	—N/a
February 24, 1978	Osaka	Japan	Matsushita Denki Taiikukan	—N/a	—N/a
February 25, 1978	Osaka	Japan	Matsushita Denki Taiikukan	—N/a	—N/a
February 26, 1978	Osaka	Japan	Matsushita Denki Taiikukan	—N/a	—N/a
February 28, 1978	Tokyo	Japan	Nippon Budokan	—N/a	—N/a
March 1, 1978	Tokyo	Japan	Nippon Budokan	—N/a	—N/a
March 2, 1978	Tokyo	Japan	Nippon Budokan	—N/a	—N/a
March 3, 1978	Tokyo	Japan	Nippon Budokan	—N/a	—N/a
March 4, 1978	Tokyo	Japan	Nippon Budokan	—N/a	—N/a
Oceania
March 9, 1978	Auckland	New Zealand	Western Springs Stadium	—N/a	—N/a
March 12, 1978	Brisbane	Australia	Brisbane Festival Hall	—N/a	—N/a
March 13, 1978	Brisbane	Australia	Brisbane Festival Hall	—N/a	—N/a
March 14, 1978	Brisbane	Australia	Brisbane Festival Hall	—N/a	—N/a
March 15, 1978	Brisbane	Australia	Brisbane Festival Hall	—N/a	—N/a
March 18, 1978	Adelaide	Australia	Westlake Stadium	—N/a	—N/a
March 20, 1978	Melbourne	Australia	Sidney Myer Music Bowl	—N/a	—N/a
March 21, 1978	Melbourne	Australia	Sidney Myer Music Bowl	—N/a	—N/a
March 22, 1978	Melbourne	Australia	Sidney Myer Music Bowl	—N/a	—N/a
March 25, 1978	Perth	Australia	Perth Entertainment Centre	—N/a	—N/a
March 27, 1978	Perth	Australia	Perth Entertainment Centre	—N/a	—N/a
April 1, 1978	Sydney	Australia	Sydney Show Ground	—N/a	—N/a
North America
June 1, 1978	Los Angeles	United States	Universal Amphitheatre	36,750 / 36,750	$459,375
June 2, 1978	Los Angeles	United States	Universal Amphitheatre	36,750 / 36,750	$459,375
June 3, 1978	Los Angeles	United States	Universal Amphitheatre	36,750 / 36,750	$459,375
June 4, 1978	Los Angeles	United States	Universal Amphitheatre	36,750 / 36,750	$459,375
June 5, 1978	Los Angeles	United States	Universal Amphitheatre	36,750 / 36,750	$459,375
June 6, 1978	Los Angeles	United States	Universal Amphitheatre	36,750 / 36,750	$459,375
June 7, 1978	Los Angeles	United States	Universal Amphitheatre	36,750 / 36,750	$459,375
Europe
June 15, 1978	London	England	Earls Court Exhibition Centre	—N/a	—N/a
June 16, 1978	London	England	Earls Court Exhibition Centre	—N/a	—N/a
June 17, 1978	London	England	Earls Court Exhibition Centre	—N/a	—N/a
June 18, 1978	London	England	Earls Court Exhibition Centre	—N/a	—N/a
June 19, 1978	London	England	Earls Court Exhibition Centre	—N/a	—N/a
June 20, 1978	London	England	Earls Court Exhibition Centre	—N/a	—N/a
June 23, 1978	Rotterdam	Netherlands	Feijenoord Stadion	—N/a	—N/a
June 26, 1978	Dortmund	West Germany	Westfalenhallen	—N/a	—N/a
June 27, 1978	Dortmund	West Germany	Westfalenhallen	—N/a	—N/a
June 29, 1978	West Berlin	West Germany	Deutschlandhalle	—N/a	—N/a
July 1, 1978	Nuremberg	West Germany	Zeppelinfeld	—N/a	—N/a
July 3, 1978	Paris	France	Pavillon de Paris	—N/a	—N/a
July 4, 1978	Paris	France	Pavillon de Paris	—N/a	—N/a
July 5, 1978	Paris	France	Pavillon de Paris	—N/a	—N/a
July 6, 1978	Paris	France	Pavillon de Paris	—N/a	—N/a
July 8, 1978	Paris	France	Pavillon de Paris	—N/a	—N/a
July 11, 1978	Gothenburg	Sweden	Scandinavium	—N/a	—N/a
July 12, 1978	Gothenburg	Sweden	Scandinavium	—N/a	—N/a
July 15, 1978	Camberley	England	Blackbushe Aerodrome	—N/a	—N/a
North America
September 15, 1978	Augusta	United States	Augusta Civic Center	—N/a	—N/a
September 16, 1978	Portland	United States	Cumberland County Civic Center	—N/a	—N/a
September 17, 1978	New Haven	United States	New Haven Coliseum	—N/a	—N/a
September 19, 1978	Montreal	Canada	Montreal Forum	—N/a	—N/a
September 20, 1978	Boston	United States	Boston Garden	—N/a	—N/a
September 22, 1978	Syracuse	United States	Onondaga County War Memorial	—N/a	—N/a
September 23, 1978	Rochester	United States	War Memorial Auditorium	—N/a	—N/a
September 24, 1978	Binghamton	United States	Broome County Veterans Memorial Arena	—N/a	—N/a
September 26, 1978	Springfield	United States	Springfield Civic Center	—N/a	—N/a
September 27, 1978	Uniondale	United States	Nassau Coliseum	—N/a	—N/a
September 29, 1978	New York City	United States	Madison Square Garden	—N/a	—N/a
September 30, 1978	New York City	United States	Madison Square Garden	—N/a	—N/a
October 3, 1978	Norfolk	United States	Norfolk Scope	—N/a	—N/a
October 4, 1978	Baltimore	United States	Baltimore Civic Center	9,613 / 9,613	$89,999
October 5, 1978	Largo	United States	Capital Centre	—N/a	—N/a
October 6, 1978	Philadelphia	United States	The Spectrum	18,800 / 18,800	$164,772
October 7, 1978	Providence	United States	Providence Civic Center	—N/a	—N/a
October 9, 1978	Buffalo	United States	Buffalo Memorial Auditorium	—N/a	—N/a
October 12, 1978	Toronto	Canada	Maple Leaf Gardens	—N/a	—N/a
October 13, 1978	Detroit	United States	Detroit Olympia	—N/a	—N/a
October 14, 1978	Terre Haute	United States	Hulman Civic University Center	—N/a	—N/a
October 15, 1978	Cincinnati	United States	Riverfront Coliseum	—N/a	—N/a
October 17, 1978	Chicago	United States	Chicago Stadium	—N/a	—N/a
October 18, 1978	Chicago	United States	Chicago Stadium	—N/a	—N/a
October 20, 1978	Richfield	United States	Richfield Coliseum	—N/a	—N/a
October 21, 1978	Toledo	United States	Centennial Hall	—N/a	—N/a
October 22, 1978	Dayton	United States	University of Dayton Arena	—N/a	—N/a
October 24, 1978	Louisville	United States	Freedom Hall	—N/a	—N/a
October 25, 1978	Indianapolis	United States	Market Square Arena	—N/a	—N/a
October 27, 1978	Kalamazoo	United States	Wings Stadium	—N/a	—N/a
October 28, 1978	Carbondale	United States	SIU Arena	—N/a	—N/a
October 29, 1978	St. Louis	United States	Checkerdome	—N/a	—N/a
October 31, 1978	Saint Paul	United States	St. Paul Civic Center	—N/a	—N/a
November 1, 1978	Madison	United States	Dane County Memorial Coliseum	—N/a	—N/a
November 3, 1978	Kansas City	United States	Kemper Arena	—N/a	—N/a
November 4, 1978	Omaha	United States	Omaha Civic Auditorium	—N/a	—N/a
November 6, 1978	Denver	United States	McNichols Sports Arena	—N/a	—N/a
November 9, 1978	Portland	United States	Memorial Coliseum	—N/a	—N/a
November 10, 1978	Seattle	United States	Hec Edmundson Pavilion	—N/a	—N/a
November 11, 1978	Vancouver	Canada	Pacific Coliseum	—N/a	—N/a
November 13, 1978	Oakland	United States	Oakland–Alameda County Coliseum Arena	26,790 / 26,790	$237,561
November 14, 1978	Oakland	United States	Oakland–Alameda County Coliseum Arena	26,790 / 26,790	$237,561
November 15, 1978	Inglewood	United States	The Forum	—N/a	—N/a
November 17, 1978	San Diego	United States	San Diego Sports Arena	—N/a	—N/a
November 18, 1978	Tempe	United States	ASU Activity Center	—N/a	—N/a
November 19, 1978	Tucson	United States	McKale Memorial Center	—N/a	—N/a
November 21, 1978	El Paso	United States	Special Events Center	—N/a	—N/a
November 23, 1978	Norman	United States	Lloyd Noble Center	—N/a	—N/a
November 24, 1978	Fort Worth	United States	Tarrant County Convention Center	—N/a	—N/a
November 25, 1978	Austin	United States	Special Events Center	—N/a	—N/a
November 26, 1978	Houston	United States	The Summit	—N/a	—N/a
November 28, 1978	Jackson	United States	Mississippi Coliseum	—N/a	—N/a
November 29, 1978	Baton Rouge	United States	LSU Assembly Center	—N/a	—N/a
December 1, 1978	Memphis	United States	Mid-South Coliseum	11,868 / 11,868	$104,774
December 2, 1978	Nashville	United States	Nashville Municipal Auditorium	9,459 / 9,459	$87,985
December 3, 1978	Birmingham	United States	BJCC Coliseum	—N/a	—N/a
December 5, 1978	Mobile	United States	Mobile Civic Center	—N/a	—N/a
December 7, 1978	Greensboro	United States	Greensboro Coliseum	—N/a	—N/a
December 8, 1978	Savannah	United States	Savannah Civic Center	—N/a	—N/a
December 9, 1978	Columbia	United States	Carolina Coliseum	—N/a	—N/a
December 10, 1978	Charlotte	United States	Charlotte Coliseum	—N/a	—N/a
December 12, 1978	Atlanta	United States	Omni Coliseum	14,660 / 15,962	$127,239
December 13, 1978	Jacksonville	United States	Jacksonville Coliseum	—N/a	—N/a
December 15, 1978	Lakeland	United States	Lakeland Civic Center	—N/a	—N/a
December 16, 1978	Pembroke Pines	United States	Hollywood Sportatorium	—N/a	—N/a
