= Man Gave Names to All the Animals =

- French cover

Single by Bob Dylan

from the album Slow Train Coming
- B-side: "Trouble in Mind" (France); "When He Returns" (Europe); "When You Gonna Wake Up"(US)
- Released: 1979
- Recorded: May 4, 1979; Muscle Shoals Sound Studios
- Genre: Reggae; Christian rock
- Length: 4:25
- Label: Columbia Records
- Songwriter: Bob Dylan
- Producers: Jerry Wexler; Barry Beckett

Bob Dylan singles chronology
"Forever Young" (1978)	"Man Gave Names to All the Animals" (1979)	"Gotta Serve Somebody" (1979)

"Man Gave Names to All the Animals" is a song written by Bob Dylan that appeared on his 1979 album Slow Train Coming and was also released as a single in some European countries, becoming a chart hit in France, Belgium and a chart-topper in Spain. It was also released as a promo single in the US. However, some have labelled it the worst song Dylan ever wrote. A 2013 reader's poll conducted by Rolling Stone magazine, ranked "Man Gave Names to All the Animals" as being the fourth worst Bob Dylan song, behind "Gotta Serve Somebody" (the hit single from Slow Train Coming) in second place.

"Man Gave Names to All the Animals" has been covered by multiple artists, including Townes Van Zandt, who covered the song on his 1993 album Roadsongs. The lyrics were turned into a children's book published by Harcourt in 1999, with illustrations by Scott Menchin. The Singing Kettle covered this song in the second episode of their third BBC television series, while The Wiggles covered it on their album Furry Tales in 2013.

== Lyrics and music ==
The music to "Man Gave Names to All the Animals" is reggae-inspired. The lyrics were inspired by the biblical Book of Genesis, chapter 2 verses 19–20 in which Adam named the animals and birds. The lyrics have an appeal to children, rhyming the name of the animal with one of its characteristics. So after describing an animal's 'muddy trail' and 'curly tail', Dylan sings that 'he wasn't too small and he wasn't too big' and so that animal was named a pig. Similarly, the cow got its name because Adam 'saw milk comin' out but he didn't know how' and the bear got its name because it has a 'great big furry back and furry hair'.

In the last verse, the lyrics take a more sinister turn.

Saw an animal as smooth as glass
Slithering his way through the grass
Saw him disappear by a tree near a lake

The verse ends there, with the music hanging and the lyrics avoiding naming the snake. In concert, Dylan sometimes elaborated on the meaning of the snake to him at the time. For example, in a concert in Pittsburgh in May 1980, Dylan confirmed that the animal in the final verse is the same snake that appeared to Adam and Eve in the Garden of Eden; in Dylan's description that day, Lucifer had put his spirit into that snake, and Jesus later died not only for forgiveness of sins but also to destroy the devil's work. Despite the obvious biblical source for the song, Dylan avoids any explicit mention of Adam and Eve, which (to author Oliver Trager) seems to pin the blame for the fall of man solely on the snake. Music critic Michael Gray finds it interesting that Dylan avoids blaming Eve for man's fall, appreciating that he stops 'the song short on a beautifully hungover note at the arrival on the scene of the serpent'.

According to back-up singer Regina Havis Brown, originally Dylan was not sure if he wanted to include "Man Gave Names to All the Animals" on Slow Train Coming. But when Dylan heard Brown's three-year-old son laughing at the identification of the animals, he said 'I'm going to put that on the record.'

== Live performances ==
Dylan regularly played "Man Gave Names to All the Animals" in concert between 1979 and 1981, and he played it in concert again during his 1987 tour of Europe, in light of the song's popularity there. In concert, he often played with the lyrics, switching animals and messing up the rhymes. For example, the line 'he wasn't too small and he wasn't too big' might be followed by identifying the animal as a giraffe rather than a pig. Dylan's back-up singers would often hiss to replace the missing line identifying the snake.

== Reception ==
Rolling Stone described "Man Gave Names to All the Animals" as being 'clever' but 'not very profound' and that although it 'went over pretty well live', it is 'simplistic' and easy to see 'why it has detractors'. Author John Nogowski calls it 'an embarrassment', 'silly', and 'just awful'. But music critic Michael Gray praised it as one of the stand-out tracks on Slow Train Coming, citing its humor, its quality as a children's song, and the self-mocking contrast to the more fundamentalist tone of the songs Dylan wrote during this period. Cash Box said that the song combines "gospel-tinged theme and backup singing with reggae-inspired rhythmic approach" and that "there is subtle humor here in the lyrical, child-like rhymes." Record World said it "has a light reggae beat with a marvelous recurring keyboard line."

== Charts ==
Weekly chart performance for "Man Gave Name to All the Animals"
Chart (1979–80)	Peak
Spain (AFE)	1

Annual chart rankings for "Man Gave Name to All the Animals"
Chart (1980)	Rank
Spain (AFE)	10
