= The Best of Bob Dylan =

Greatest hits album by Bob Dylan
- Released: November 15, 2005
- Recorded: July 1962 – early 2001
- Genre: Rock
- Length: 77:56
- Label: Columbia
- Producer: Barry Beckett; Gordon Carroll; Don DeVito; Bob Dylan; John H. Hammond; Bob Johnston; Mark Knopfler; Daniel Lanois; Leon Russell; Jerry Wexler; Tom Wilson

Bob Dylan chronology
Live at Carnegie Hall 1963 (2005)	The Best of Bob Dylan (2005)	Blues (2006)

Professional ratings
Review scores
Source	Rating
PopMatters	8/10

The Best of Bob Dylan is a single-disc compilation album containing songs by Bob Dylan, released on November 15, 2005. The Best of Bob Dylan is available in a digipak format, in an attempt to imitate a vinyl record. The album has liner notes written by Bill Flanagan, with commentary on each of the album's tracks.

== Track listing ==
The Best of Bob Dylan track listing
No.	Title	Original release	Length
1.	"Blowin' in the Wind"	The Freewheelin' Bob Dylan, 1963	2:47
2.	"The Times They Are a-Changin'"	The Times They Are a-Changin', 1964	3:11
3.	"Mr. Tambourine Man"	Bringing It All Back Home, 1965	5:25
4.	"Like a Rolling Stone"	Highway 61 Revisited, 1965	6:09
5.	"Rainy Day Women ♯12 & 35"	Blonde on Blonde, 1966	4:34
6.	"All Along the Watchtower"	John Wesley Harding, 1967	2:32
7.	"Lay, Lady, Lay"	Nashville Skyline, 1969	3:18
8.	"Knockin' on Heaven's Door"	Pat Garrett & Billy the Kid, 1973	2:30
9.	"Tangled Up in Blue"	Blood on the Tracks, 1975	5:42
10.	"Hurricane"	Desire, 1976	8:32
11.	"Forever Young"	Planet Waves, 1974	4:55
12.	"Gotta Serve Somebody"	Slow Train Coming, 1979	5:25
13.	"Jokerman"	Infidels, 1983	6:15
14.	"Not Dark Yet"	Time Out of Mind, 1997	6:28
15.	"Things Have Changed"	Wonder Boys, 2000	5:08
16.	"Summer Days"	"Love and Theft", 2001	4:53

== Chart ==
Chart performance for The Best of Bob Dylan
Chart (2005)	Peak position
US Billboard 200	58
