= Helena Springs =

American singer-songwriter

- Born: c. 1961; Hollywood, Los Angeles, California, U.S.
- Other name: Helena Lisandrello
- Occupations: Singer; songwriter
- Spouse: Tony Lisandrello (m. 1984–1990)
- Children: Nina Lisandrello
- Musical career
- Genres: Pop soul; techno pop
- Years active: 1978–1987
- Label: Arista

Helena Lisandrello, known professionally as Helena Springs (born c. 1961), is an American singer. The singer was first a backup vocalist for Bob Dylan, starting in 1978 aged 17, and co-wrote 19 songs with him, more than any of his other collaborators. She was a vocalist for Dylan's 1978 World Tour, and the following year on his Gospel Tour. Springs appeared on his albums Street-Legal (1978), Bob Dylan at Budokan (1978), and Slow Train Coming (1979), as well as the compilation The Bootleg Series Vol. 13: Trouble No More 1979–1981 (2017). She stopped working with Dylan in either late 1979 or early 1980.

As a solo artist signed to Arista Records, Springs released the albums Helena in 1986 and New Love in 1987, and several singles. She has been a backup singer for other artists, including David Bowie and Mick Jagger, Bette Midler, Pet Shop Boys, and Elton John. Springs later worked in cabaret, and launched a line of toy dolls. She had personal relationships with Dylan and Robert De Niro, and was married to music executive Tony Lisandrello for six years. Actress Nina Lisandrello is her daughter.

== Career ==
Helena Springs was born c. 1961 in Hollywood, Los Angeles. She started singing, aged five, at church. When Springs was 17, she joined Bob Dylan's band as a backing singer, performing throughout 1978 on his World Tour, and the following year on his Gospel Tour. Academic John Hughes praised Springs and Carolyn Dennis for "[adding] such unforgettable potency to his gospel tours". She appeared on Dylan's albums Street-Legal (1978), Bob Dylan at Budokan (1978), and Slow Train Coming (1979), as well as the compilation The Bootleg Series Vol. 13: Trouble No More 1979–1981 (2017). Springs told interviewer Chris Cooper that she had not known about Dylan before he auditioned her, and that working with him was her "first major gig".

During the years that she worked with Dylan, Springs jointly wrote 19 songs with him, more than any of his other co-writers; she said in an interview that she had co-written a further three, but none of those were published with a credit for her. Their joint songwriting started in Brisbane in March 1978. According to Springs, she and Dylan were together one evening, and he was playing guitar. Springs told Dylan she was not a writer, and he offered to write something together, telling her "You start singing some stuff and I'll start playing", with the two jointly composing "If I Don't Be There by Morning" and "Walk Out in the Rain" in the session. Both of those, and fellow collaboration, "Stop Now", were recorded by Dylan and his band during the Street-Legal sessions. Heylin included two of the acknowledged joint compositions as among the 25 best of Dylan's unreleased tracks in a 2010 article. He called "Coming from the Heart", which has been performed in concert by Dylan only once, and was covered by the Searchers, "one of Dylan's best love songs". Heylin also included "More Than Flesh and Blood", which had been intended to be Springs' debut solo single. Covers of "Walk Out in the Rain" and "If I Don't Be There by Morning" were included on Eric Clapton's 1978 album Backless. In 1987, Clapton told an interviewer for Dylan fanzine The Telegraph that Dylan had handed him a cassette tape with the two songs when they met in Germany, and that "[Dylan and Springs] were co-writing, and I think he was very proud of it". According to Dylan biographer Spencer Leigh, the meeting was on July 1 in Nuremberg, when Clapton played guitar on stage during Dylan's concert.

In either late 1979 or early 1980, Springs and Dylan argued, which led to her leaving the tour band, although she retained employment by Dylan's touring company for some time afterwards. The singer joined Bette Midler as one of the Harlettes. Springs contributed backing vocals to the Pet Shop Boys track "West End Girls" (1984), and co-wrote a song, known variously as "New Life, New Love", "New Love" or "A New Life", with Neil Tennant and Chris Lowe (released as "A New Life", the B-side of the "What Have I Done to Deserve This?" single in 1987). She was a backing vocalist on David Bowie and Mick Jagger's cover of "Dancing in the Street" (1985), and performed on stage with Bowie at Live Aid the same year. The following year, the singer toured with Elton John.

Springs signed to Arista Records, who released her albums Helena in 1986 and New Love in 1987. They also issued her singles "I Want You", (Note: Not to be confused with the song with the same title by Bob Dylan.) "New Love", "Paper Money", and "Be Soft with Me Tonight". In 1987, she told interviewers that one of her main influences was Tina Turner, and that "I have never been a backing singer. I have sung with people who allowed me to be up front." "Be Soft with Me Tonight" was praised as a "haunting ballad" by Paul Cole in the Birmingham Evening Mail. The reviewer of New Love in the Evening Post wrote that Springs "seems to have a penchant for hi-energy pop soul" but "doesn't really have the songs". Peter Holt of The Evening Standard, highlighting the track "Paper Money", opined that Springs demonstrated a "knack for writing a good pop song" and that "'Black Stockings' makes Tina Turner sound as sexy as cold rice pudding". Springs was described as having a "rather deep voice which is well-suited to this techno-pop-gone-crazy single", by John Lee in the Huddersfield Daily Examiner. Lee wrote that Springs had "certainly come up with something a bit different that could make her bundles of the stuff she's singing about." The pan-European magazine Music & Media named New Love one of its "albums of the week" in the issue dated August 29, 1987.

Springs later worked in cabaret, and launched a line of toy dolls.

== Personal life ==
Springs had a personal relationship with Dylan, which is thought to be the inspiration of his song "New Pony" (1978). In 1979, she started a relationship with Robert De Niro, who was filming Raging Bull at the time. In his biography of De Niro, John Parker writes the relationship continued on a casual basis for a number of years, and that when Springs had a child in 1982, De Niro paid her $35,000 in cash and selected the child's name. However, blood tests a decade later showed that De Niro was not the father. In the interim, Springs married music executive Tony Lisandrello in July 1984, and their marriage ended six years later. Nina Lisandrello, Springs's daughter, is an actress.
