= Precious Angel =

Single by Bob Dylan

from the album Slow Train Coming
- B-side: "Trouble in Mind"
- Released: 1979
- Recorded: May 1, 1979
- Studio: Muscle Shoals Sound Studios
- Genre: Rock; gospel; reggae
- Length: 6:31
- Label: Columbia Records
- Songwriter: Bob Dylan
- Producers: Jerry Wexler; Barry Beckett

Bob Dylan singles chronology
"Gotta Serve Somebody" (1979)	"Precious Angel" (1979)	"Slow Train" (1979)

"Precious Angel" is a song written by Bob Dylan that first appeared on his 1979 album Slow Train Coming. It was also released as a single in the Netherlands. "Precious Angel'" is a religious love song, released during his "born-again Christian" period. Music critic Michael Gray considers it one of the standout tracks on Slow Train Coming.

It has been included on a number of Bob Dylan compilation albums, including Dylan and Playlist: The Very Best of Bob Dylan '70s. It was included in most shows during Dylan's Gospel Tour in 1979 and 1980 but he has not played it in concert since then. It was also covered by World Wide Message Tribe on the 1998 album Heatseeker.

== Composition ==
Authors Oliver Keys and John Nogowski particularly praise the guitar playing of Mark Knopfler on the song.

== Themes ==
At a concert in Seattle on January 14, 1980, Dylan claimed that the song is addressed to the woman who brought him to Christianity. This is consistent with the lyrics, particularly in the final verse where Dylan refers to his delivering angel as the torch that led him to the greater light of Jesus. The chorus might be addressed to either the precious angel or to Jesus:

Shine your light, shine your light on me
Ya know I couldn't make it by myself
I'm a little too blind to see

The lyrics contain many biblical references. The theme of the song seems to be taken from 2 Corinthians 4:4 to 4:6, in which the light of Christ is contrasted with the darkness faced by those deluded by the devil. The line "Now there's spiritual warfare, flesh and blood breaking down" appears to be a reflection of another verse from 2 Corinthians (10:3) which states "For though we walk in the flesh, we do not war after the flesh". The line in the chorus about blindness appears to be influenced by a passage from the Gospel of John in which the blind man healed by Jesus proclaims that "Whereas I was blind, now I can see". The opening line of the chorus may be taken from the Book of Isaiah 9:1, which states "The people that walked in darkness have seen a great light; those who dwelled in the land of the shadow of death, light has dawned". It also recalls the chorus from Dylan's earlier song "I Shall Be Released", in which Dylan sang about redemption through a "light come shining from the west down to the east".

A line from the song continues the theme of the previous song on Slow Train Coming, "Gotta Serve Somebody", stating that "You either got faith or you got unbelief and there ain't no neutral ground". In an echo of earlier songs such as "Positively 4th Street", Dylan later addresses his "so-called friends" who have "fallen under a spell" while thinking "all is well", their cluelessness further echoing Mr. Jones from 1965's "Ballad of a Thin Man." Dylan asks:

Can they imagine the darkness that will fall from on high
When men will beg God to kill them and they won't be able to die?

The notion of a fate worse than death has yet another biblical source, this time Book of Revelation 9:6 which states "In those days shall men seek death, and shall not find it; and shall desire to die and death shall flee from them". The fourth verse of the song is directed at a "sister" who spoke of Buddha and Muhammad but not Jesus. Music critic Paul Williams suggests that this is a dig at Dylan's ex-wife Sara for keeping him from learning of Jesus sooner.

=== Identity of the woman ===
There has been much speculation over the exact identity of the precious angel the song is about. There are hints that she is black, particularly the phrase that he and the angel are "covered in blood, girl, you know our forefathers were slaves", referencing the slavery in Egypt of Dylan's Jewish ancestors and slavery of blacks in the United States before the American Civil War. Dylan biographer Clinton Heylin has suggested that the identity of the woman is Mary Alice Artes, who had been converted by the Vineyard Movement and subsequently helped Dylan on his path to Christianity, albeit after Dylan began the journey on his own.
