= Slow Train (Bob Dylan song) =

Single by Bob Dylan

from the album Slow Train Coming
- B-side: "Do Right to Me Baby (Do Unto Others)"
- Released: March 1980
- Recorded: May 3, 1979
- Studio: Muscle Shoals Sound Studios
- Genre: Blues rock; funk rock; Christian rock; gospel
- Length: 6:02
- Label: Columbia Records
- Songwriter: Bob Dylan
- Producers: Jerry Wexler; Barry Beckett

Bob Dylan singles chronology
"Precious Angel" (1979)	"Slow Train" (1980)	"Solid Rock" (1980)

"Slow Train" is a song written by Bob Dylan that first appeared on his 1979 album Slow Train Coming. In the United States, it was released as the follow-up single to "Gotta Serve Somebody." It was also released as the lead song from Dylan's 1989 live album with the Grateful Dead, Dylan & the Dead. Music critic Paul Williams has called it "the one track [on Slow Train Coming] that must be listened to again and again and again, inexhaustible, essential." Rolling Stone editor Jann Wenner has called it "nothing less than Dylan's most mature and profound song about America". Cover art by Catherine Kanner

== Writing and recording ==
"Slow Train" has an earlier genesis than most of the songs on Slow Train Coming. It began life as an instrumental Dylan used to warm up with on tour in late 1978. A recording of the song with some lyrics exists from a soundcheck of a December 2, 1978 show in Nashville, Tennessee, although only the chorus and a few lines from that version were retained on the ultimate recording. A studio demo was recorded in April 1979, and the album version was recorded on May 3, 1979, at Muscle Shoals Sound Studio in Sheffield, Alabama. Dylan previously used the symbol of a holy slow train in the liner notes to his 1965 album Highway 61 Revisited: "the subject matter – though meaningless as it is – has something to do with a holy slow train".

== Lyrics and music ==
Dylan wrote "Slow Train" as a protest song through a Christian lens. Targets of Dylan's outrage include himself, his friends, OPEC, false leaders, injustice, greed, poverty, conformity and hypocrisy, including religious hypocrisy. Although most of the songs on Slow Train Coming explicitly referenced Dylan's recent conversion, "Slow Train" was indirect and metaphorical. And unlike many songs on the album it has no explicit biblical references and only a single reference to Satan.

The second and last verses sketch a relationship with a backwoods girl from Alabama. In the second verse, the girl warns Dylan that he needs to straighten out lest he die and become an accident statistic. In the seventh and final verse, she leaves him for a dangerous man from Illinois. Dylan uses this experience to sum up that "it sure do bother me to see my loved ones turning into puppets". Music critic Michael Gray also finds in these verses a continuation of the themes of "wavering resolve and betrayal" from Dylan's previous album, Street Legal.

In between, Dylan takes aim at his targets. The third verse has been controversial, with Dylan complaining about foreign oil controlling the United States, with

Sheiks walkin' around like kings
Wearing fancy jewels and nose rings
Deciding America's future from Amsterdam and to Paris

Paul Williams criticizes this verse for conveying "racial prejudice and righteous nationalism". Author John Nogowski complains that this implies that God is a "distinctly American figure". Other critics found the verse to be racist and jingoistic, although author Seth Rogovoy, writing 30 years later, claims that although "perhaps overly patriotic at the time", the verse has proved prophetic, as reliance on foreign energy had laid the foundation for the "long-term destruction of America's economic engine", with destructive environmental consequences to boot.

Other verses contain abundant criticism about America, with lines about how "in the home of the brave, Jefferson's turning over in his grave, fools glorifying themselves, trying to manipulate Satan." Commenting on the sixth verse, that states "people starving and thirsting," while "grain elevators are bursting" even though "you know it costs more to store the food than it do to give it", Allmusic critic Jim Esch said was evidence that Dylan's conversion to Christianity "had reawakened an outraged moral sensibility"; Rogovoy points to it as a prime example of Dylan "pointing out the hypocrisy and stupidity lying behind social dysfunction; Gray comments on the prescience of these lines six years before Live Aid.

The image in the refrain of a "slow train comin' around the bend" has been interpreted as a symbol of the coming apocalypse and as a symbol of salvation. Rogovoy finds the symbol ambiguous—although the slow train appears to be a symbol of deliverance, that is not made explicit, and so while the train "may be bound for glory", as in songs by Woody Guthrie and Curtis Mayfield, it may also be bound for some place more sinister, especially given the use of trains during the 20th century to transport people to destinations of mass murder. Dylan biographer Clinton Heylin, too, sees ambiguity in a symbol that Dylan would have been familiar with as a symbol of redemption in songs by Guthrie and Mayfield turning into more of an apocalyptic symbol by the time he wrote this song. Literature professor Stephen Scobie sees the train as an image of the apocalypse, but since the train is slow it is late, and thus although the apocalypse is coming eventually it is not clear when.

Although Williams considers some of the lyrics "dumb", though not the chorus which he describes as "perfect", he believes the music and vocal performance ennoble them and give them meaning, making the song "essential" and "inexhaustible". According to Williams, the texture of the voice, guitar, bass, drums and keyboards "communicate to us the truth about Bob Dylan at this moment of his life, and also the truth...about ourselves as we listen". Williams has particular praise for Barry Beckett's keyboard playing after the fifth verse, which he describes as a "brief incredible keyboard orgasm". Allmusic's Esch also praises the intensity of Dylan's vocal performance, as well as Mark Knopfler's lead guitar playing. Ultimately, Williams finds a joy in the music that is at odds with the disgust Dylan claims to feel in the lyrics: he ascribes this joy to Dylan being able to liberate and unburden himself in the lyrics.

== Reception ==
Music critic Robert Shelton describes "Slow Train" as being "among the most powerful music [Dylan had] done since Desire"; Michael Gray considers it one of the standout tracks on Slow Train Coming.Allmusic critic Jim Esch also calls it "one of the better tracks" on Slow Train Coming, citing the "pressure cooker musical backing", especially Mark Knopfler on guitar and the Muscle Shoals Horns, the intensity of Dylan's delivery, and the song's "catchy lines". He claims that "because the lyrics are more elliptical in their Christian references, "Slow Train" is more accessible to general audiences than the more overtly evangelical tracks of his Christian period work." Cash Box called it a "bluesy" track that "combines nationalism and spiritualism effectively." Record World said that "Mark Knopfler's distinguished guitar style fits the mood." Nonetheless, according to Dylan biographer Clinton Heylin, the background of Dylan's profession of Christian faith led to much criticism of the song. Melody Maker critic Chris Bohn called "Slow Train" "possibly the most irresponsible song Dylan has ever written". NME critic Charles Shaar Murray was upset that Dylan "has divided the world into Good and Evil according to the precepts of a narrow and fundamentalist creed", focusing on punishment rather than liberation and doing so "in sour and elitist terms".

On the other hand, Rolling Stone editor Jann Wenner said "Slow Train" was "unequivocally in the tradition of the 'state of the union' songs that Dylan has put on every record he's ever done...[and] is nothing less than Dylan's most mature and profound song about America". Music critic Paul Williams has called it "the white hot core of the album; the one track that must be listened to again and again and again, inexhaustible, essential". Despite his reservations about the lyrics in the verse about oil sheiks, Nogowski assesses this "damning assessment of the state of the Union" positively due to its "artistic ambitions".

A 2021 Guardian article included it on a list of "80 Bob Dylan songs everyone should know".

== Live performances ==
"Slow Train" was a staple of the 1979 Gospel Tour in 1979 and 1980. He revived the song for the 1987 tour with the Grateful Dead. In all, he has performed the song 127 times.
