= Dragon's Game =

Fantasy novels

Dragon's Game is the collective name for a series of fantasy novels written by Carol L. Dennis and Richard E. Dennis. The series is set within the known timeline, making no alterations to Earth's history, but adding onto it in other locations. The storyline spans from the 1960s to the 21st century, and features three generations of heroes, descended from the original protagonist.

== Novels ==
- Dragon's Pawn (Carol L. Dennis, Questar: 1987 and Pale Horse Publishing: 1999)
- Dragon's Knight (Carol L. Dennis, Questar: 1989)
- Dragon's Queen (Carol L. Dennis, Questar: 1991)
- Dragon's Game (Carol L. Dennis, Wildside Press: 2004) - Omnibus containing above
- Dragon's Rook (Carol and Rick Dennis, Pale Horse Publishing: 2006)
- Dragon's Bishop (as by Carol Dennis and Rick Dennis, Pale Horse Publishing: 2007)
- Gunnora's Dragons (as by Carol Denni, Wildside Press: 2011)
