= Bob Dylan at Budokan =

Live album by Bob Dylan
- Released: 21 August 1978
- Recorded: 28 February and 1 March 1978
- Venues: Nippon Budokan Hall, Tokyo, Japan
- Genre: Rock
- Length: 99:41
- Label: CBS/Sony
- Producer: Don DeVito

Bob Dylan chronology
Street-Legal (1978)	Bob Dylan at Budokan (1978)	Slow Train Coming (1979)

Singles from Bob Dylan at Budokan
- 1. "Love Minus Zero/No Limit" Released: 1979 (Australia); 2. "Forever Young" Released: June 22, 1979 (UK/Germany)

Bob Dylan at Budokan is a live album by American singer-songwriter Bob Dylan, released August 1978 on Columbia Records in Japan only, followed by a worldwide release in April 1979. It was recorded during his 1978 world tour and is composed mostly of the artist's "greatest hits". The performances in the album are radically altered from the originals, using almost all the musicians who played on Street-Legal, but relying on a much larger band and stronger use of woodwind and backing singers. In some respects the arrangements are more conventional than the original arrangements, for which the album was criticized. For a few critics, such as Janet Maslin of Rolling Stone, the differences between the older and newer arrangements had become less important.

== Recording and releases ==
The audio recording is from shows on 28 February and 1 March 1978. Columbia Records released this double LP in Japan on 21 August 1978. Later that year, it was released in Australia and New Zealand. On 23 April 1979, spurred by extensive importing and at least one counterfeit European edition, Columbia released the album to worldwide markets. The shows were the fourth and fifth in an eight-show appearance at Nippon Budokan Hall in Tokyo, Japan.

An expanded version of the album, titled The Complete Budokan 1978, featuring all of the songs on the original release in newly remixed and remastered form, and featuring 36 previously unreleased tracks, was released on 17 November 2023 by Columbia Records. This release comprises Dylan's Budokan concerts from 28 February and 1 March 1978 in their entirety. In a press release, chief engineer Tom Suzuki said of the remix: “We mixed the record with the keyword ‘passion’ in mind . . . The result is a mix that surpasses the original 1978 release, providing a crisper and clearer sound where each instrument and Bob Dylan’s voice are distinctly audible".

== Reception and legacy ==
Professional ratings
Review scores
Source	Rating
Allmusic	2/5 stars
Christgau's Record Guide	C+
The Encyclopedia of Popular Music	3/5 stars
Rolling Stone	1/5 stars

Bob Dylan at Budokan reached No. 13 in the U.S. and went gold, while simultaneously peaking at No. 4 in the UK.

Publishing in his "Consumer Guide" column, Robert Christgau gave the album a C+ rating, writing "I believe this double LP was made available so our hero could boast of being outclassed by Cheap Trick, who had the self-control to release but a single disc from this location". Critic Jimmy Guterman named it one of the worst albums ever released in the history of rock.

However, the album received stronger reviews in Europe, and critic Janet Maslin (then a music critic for Rolling Stone magazine) defended the album in her review. "The method here is hit-or-miss, and the results are correspondingly spotty", Maslin wrote. "The fire and brimstone are behind Dylan, [but] this hardly means the fight has gone out of him: Bob Dylan at Budokan is a very contentious effort—and, for the most part, a victorious one".

NJArts' Jay Lustig called it the "least essential" of Dylan's three live albums of the 1970s but also noted that it allowed him to bring "some new nuances to his material" and cited "the slow, aching 'I Want You" as the standout track.

Stereogum ran an article to coincide with Dylan's 80th birthday on 24 May 2021 in which 80 musicians were asked to name their favorite Dylan songs. Steve Gunn selected the Budokan version of "Shelter from the Storm", noting that "the delivery is declarative and minimal, holding a steady line and giving the song a different life than the original. There’s a new confidence, which gives one of my all-time favorite Dylan lines new resonance: 'I came in from the wilderness, a creature void of form'. Dylan’s life is full of comeback waves, and the energy propulsing through this song is testament to his genius for looking deeper into his art".

Despite its initial lukewarm reception, the album has developed a cult following over the years, with some commentators expressing admiration for its "innovative arrangements" and referring to it as an "overlooked classic".

== Track listing ==
All tracks are written by Bob Dylan, except where noted.

Side one
No.	Title	Length
1.	"Mr. Tambourine Man"	4:54
2.	"Shelter from the Storm"	4:30
3.	"Love Minus Zero/No Limit"	3:52
4.	"Ballad of a Thin Man"	4:47
5.	"Don't Think Twice, It's All Right"	4:55
Total length:		22:58

Side two
No.	Title	Length
1.	"Maggie's Farm"	5:06
2.	"One More Cup of Coffee (Valley Below)"	3:19
3.	"Like a Rolling Stone"	6:31
4.	"I Shall Be Released"	4:12
5.	"Is Your Love in Vain?"	4:02
6.	"Going, Going, Gone"	4:22
Total length:		27:32

Side three
No.	Title	Writer(s)	Length
1.	"Blowin' in the Wind"		4:25
2.	"Just Like a Woman"		5:03
3.	"Oh, Sister"	Bob Dylan, Jacques Levy	4:44
4.	"Simple Twist of Fate"		4:15
5.	"All Along the Watchtower"		3:20
6.	"I Want You"		2:34
Total length:			24:21

Side four
No.	Title	Length
1.	"All I Really Want to Do"	3:37
2.	"Knockin' on Heaven's Door"	4:00
3.	"It's Alright, Ma (I'm Only Bleeding)"	6:04
4.	"Forever Young"	5:38
5.	"The Times They Are a-Changin'"	5:31
Total length:		24:50

== Personnel ==
- Bob Dylan – vocals, guitar, harmonica
- Steve Douglas – saxophone, flute, recorder
- Steven Soles – acoustic guitar, backing vocals
- David Mansfield – pedal steel guitar, violin, mandolin, dobro, guitar
- Billy Cross – lead guitar
- Alan Pasqua – keyboards
- Rob Stoner – bass guitar, backing vocals
- Ian Wallace – drums
- Bobbye Hall – percussion
- Debi Dye, Jo Ann Harris, Helena Springs – backing vocals

=== Production ===
- Don DeVito – production
- Tim Charles – monitor mixer
- Val Lane – sound technician

== Charts ==
=== Weekly charts ===
1979 chart performance for Bob Dylan at Budokan
Chart (1979)	Peak position
Austrian Albums (Ö3 Austria)	7
Dutch Albums (Album Top 100)	6
German Albums (Offizielle Top 100)	24
New Zealand Albums (RMNZ)	3
Norwegian Albums (VG-lista)	2
Swedish Albums (Sverigetopplistan)	4
UK Albums (Official Charts)	4
US Billboard 200	13

2023 chart performance for Bob Dylan at Budokan
Chart (2023)	Peak position
German Albums (Offizielle Top 100)	15
Swiss Albums (Schweizer Hitparade)	13

=== Year-end charts ===
Chart (1979)	Position
Austrian Albums (Ö3 Austria)	24
Dutch Albums (Album Top 100)	63

== Certifications ==
Region	Certification	Certified units/sales
Australia (ARIA)	Platinum	70,000^{^}
Canada (Music Canada)	Gold	50,000^{^}
United States (RIAA)	Gold	500,000^{^}
^{^} Shipments figures based on certification alone.
