= When He Returns =

1979 song by Bob Dylan

Song by Bob Dylan

from the album Slow Train Coming
- Released: August 20, 1979
- Recorded: April 30–May 11, 1979
- Studio: Muscle Shoals Sound Studio
- Genre: Gospel
- Length: 4:30
- Label: Columbia
- Songwriter(s): Bob Dylan
- Producer(s): Jerry Wexler

"When He Returns" is a gospel song written and performed by the American singer-songwriter Bob Dylan and released as the ninth and final track on his 1979 album Slow Train Coming. The title and content of the song explicitly reference the Second Coming of Jesus. In contrast to the bigger band arrangements on the album's other eight tracks, Dylan's vocal on "When He Returns" is accompanied only by Barry Beckett on piano. The song was recorded at Muscle Shoals Sound Studio in Sheffield, Alabama and produced by Jerry Wexler.

== Composition and recording ==
In their book Bob Dylan All the Songs: The Story Behind Every Track, authors Philippe Margotin and Jean-Michel Guesdon cite the Gospel of Matthew, especially the following quote from the Sermon on the Mount, as Dylan's main source of inspiration: "But the gate that leads to life is small and the road is narrow, and those who find it are few". They also note that the song bears a resemblance to Dylan's earlier "Blowin' in the Wind": "In both songs, Dylan uses the metaphor of a man who has eyes but does not see. What differs is the answer. In 'Blowin' in the Wind', there is no answer; in 'When He Returns', the answer lies in trust in Christ".

According to producer Jerry Wexler, "It was Dylan's intention not to sing on the song at all, rather it was to be a lead ensemble by the otherwise backup female singers. Beckett's piano was an ad-lib accompaniment to a vocal Dylan had made as a demo for the singers to use while rehearsing. Ultimately, however, Dylan abandoned his original notion, and after practicing overnight, he redid his vocal to fit the demo's spontaneous piano track".

== Reception ==
The song, in both the studio version and in live performances, is considered to feature some of Dylan's most passionate vocals. The original studio recording, for instance, was cited by Dylan's biographer Clinton Heylin as “perhaps Dylan’s strongest studio vocal since ‘Visions of Johanna’" in 1966, while Dylan scholar Tony Attwood refers to a live version from 1980 as "the one Dylan performance that could convert a sinner such as me".

A 2021 Guardian article included it on a list of "80 Bob Dylan songs everyone should know".

== In popular culture ==
Jean-Luc Godard has used the song in three different films: In his 1986 made-for-television film Grandeur et décadence d'un petit commerce de cinéma, there is a scene in which a character played by Jean-Pierre Léaud listens over and over again to an excerpt from the song featuring the lyric "Truth is an arrow and the gate is narrow that it passes through". Godard also weaves excerpts from the song into the tapestry-like soundtracks of his later short films Puissance de la parole (1988) and Khan Khanne (2014).

== Live performances ==
Dylan performed the song 47 times in concert between 1979 and 1981. Two of these live versions (along with an alternate studio take) were included on the album The Bootleg Series Vol. 13: Trouble No More 1979–1981.

== Cover versions ==
Gospel singer and Bishop Rance Allen covered the song for the Grammy Award-nominated 2003 album Gotta Serve Somebody: The Gospel Songs of Bob Dylan. A filmed version of this studio performance was also included in a 2005 documentary by the same title.

Indie rock band Vampire Weekend covered the song during their performance at the New Orleans Jazz & Heritage Festival in 2024.
