= Carol L. Dennis =

American novelist

- Born: 1938 (age 87–88)
- Education: University of Toledo (BEd); University of Houston–Clear Lake (MS)
- Occupations: Author; editor; educator
- Spouse: Richard

Carol Larkey Dennis (born 1938) is an American author, editor, and teacher.

== Biography ==
Carol Dennis is a graduate from the University of Toledo (B.Ed.) and the University of Houston–Clear Lake (M.S.).

She has eight books published. Her books form two series. The oldest one is the Dragon's Game, which has six volumes, plus an omnibus of the first three in a hardcover volume called Dragon's Game. The second, currently referred to informally as Guardian's Universe, has had two novels published, Guardian's Gambit & Guardian's Choice.

She is the Senior Editor for Pale Horse Publishing and operates her editing service, Lar-Ryk Associates. She has edited at least twelve published books. She has taught at San Jacinto and Angelina colleges, as well as the Rice University, the University of Houston–Clear Lake, and Clear Lake High School.

She resides in Trinity, Texas, with her husband, Richard.
