= Gotta Serve Somebody =

1979 single Bob Dylan

Single by Bob Dylan

from the album Slow Train Coming
- B-side: "Trouble in Mind"
- Released: August 20, 1979
- Recorded: May 4, 1979
- Studio: Muscle Shoals Sound Studios
- Genre: Blues rock; Christian rock; pop rock; funk; gospel
- Length: 5:25
- Label: Columbia
- Songwriter: Bob Dylan
- Producers: Jerry Wexler; Barry Beckett

Bob Dylan singles chronology
"Changing of the Guards" (1978)	"Gotta Serve Somebody" (1979)	"Precious Angel" (1979)

Audio sample
- file; help

"Gotta Serve Somebody" is a song written and performed by American singer-songwriter Bob Dylan, released as the opening track on his 1979 studio album Slow Train Coming. It won the Grammy Award for Best Rock Vocal Performance by a Male in 1980. It was later anthologized on the compilation albums Biograph (1985), Bob Dylan's Greatest Hits Volume 3 (1994), The Essential Bob Dylan (2000), The Best of Bob Dylan and Dylan (2007).

== Reception ==
As Dylan's first release during his "gospel" period, "Gotta Serve Somebody" was met with divided reviews; John Lennon criticized the song and wrote a parody titled "Serve Yourself" in response. Nevertheless, the single won the Grammy for Best Rock Vocal Performance by a Male in 1980. The effort is still Dylan's latest top 40 hit on the Hot 100, peaking at No. 24 and remaining on the chart for 12 weeks. The song did best in Canada, where it spent two weeks at No. 23.

Cash Box said that the "bluesy instrumentals" were the song's highlight and that "Dylan avoids a preachy tone with humorous asides." Record World said that "Dylan's fervent vocals, laced with a gospel female chorus, and subdued keyboard/guitar lines make this an important statement."

In 2016, Rolling Stone magazine featured the song as No. 43 on its list of "100 Greatest Bob Dylan Songs". A 2021 Guardian article included it on a list of "80 Bob Dylan songs everyone should know". In June 2026, CBS News included the song in its list of the 250 essential American songs of the past 250 years.

== Live performances ==
Dylan has performed the song over 500 times in concert since 1979. The live versions he has performed in more recent years feature almost entirely new lyrics, as seen in his "Mondo Scripto" art exhibition in 2018. A live version performed with the Grateful Dead in 1987 was included on the officially released live album Dylan and the Dead. An additional seven versions of the song (five live performances from 1979-1980, a studio outtake and a tour rehearsal) were included on the box set The Bootleg Series Vol. 13: Trouble No More 1979–1981 in 2017. The song was performed on Saturday Night Live, Oct. 20th 1979. Eric Idle was the host that night.

== Music video ==
Director John Wilson created an animated video for Gotta Serve Somebody in 1983.

== Personnel ==
- Bob Dylan – Vocals, Guitar
- Mark Knopfler – Guitar
- Barry Beckett – electric piano, organ
- Tim Drummond – bass
- Pick Withers – drums
- Carolyn Dennis, Helena Springs, Regina Havis – backing vocals

== Charts ==
Chart performance for "Gotta Serve Somebody"
Chart (1979)	Peak position
Australia (Kent Music Report)	96
US Billboard Hot 100	24
