= Saved (Bob Dylan album) =

Studio album by Bob Dylan
- Released: June 23, 1980
- Recorded: February 11–15, 1980
- Studio: Muscle Shoals, Sheffield, Alabama
- Genre: Christian rock; gospel
- Length: 42:39
- Label: Columbia
- Producer: Barry Beckett; Jerry Wexler

Bob Dylan chronology
Slow Train Coming (1979)	Saved (1980)	Shot of Love (1981)

Singles from Saved
- 1. "Solid Rock" Released: July 1980; 2. "Saved" Released: August 1980

Re-released cover

Saved is the twentieth studio album by American singer-songwriter Bob Dylan, released on June 23, 1980, by Columbia Records. Saved was the second album of Dylan's "Christian trilogy". It expanded on themes explored on its predecessor Slow Train Coming, with gospel arrangements and lyrics extolling the importance of a strong personal faith.

== Artwork ==
The cover of Saved originally featured a painting by Tony Wright of Jesus Christ's hand reaching down to touch the hands of his believers. However, this cover was subsequently replaced by a painting of Dylan on stage performing during that time period in order to downplay the overtly religious nature of the original cover. It has since been changed back on some re-releases. A quote inside the sleevenotes reads: "'Behold, the days come, sayeth the Lord, that I will make a new covenant with the house of Israel, and with the house of Judah' (Jeremiah 31:31)".

== Release and reception ==
Professional ratings
Review scores
Source	Rating
AllMusic	2/5 stars
CCM Magazine	
Christgau's Record Guide	C+
The Encyclopedia of Popular Music	1/5 stars
Entertainment Weekly	C−
Tom Hull	B−
Rolling Stone	3/5 stars
The Rolling Stone Album Guide	1/5 stars

The album hit No. 3 on the UK charts, reached No. 24 on the US charts, selling around 380,000 copies and did not go gold. CCM Magazine described the album as an "open declaration of Dylan's deepening faith." Critical reaction to the album was mixed. Robert Christgau awarded the album a "C+", which is described by Christgau as "most likely a failed experiment or a pleasant piece of hackwork". Writing for Rolling Stone, Kurt Loder praised Dylan's backing band, but felt that several songs were hampered by overtly religious messages, although he did single out "In the Garden" for having a "lovely, billowing arrangement". Loder stated that Dylan's efforts at a gospel album were not as remarkable as others "not just because he lacks the vocal equipment but because he's too inventive, too big for the genre", but summarised Saved as a gospel work with "some distinction". In 2020, Rolling Stone included Saved in their "80 Greatest albums of 1980" list, praising Dylan for being "at the peak of his vocal powers, and he’s rarely played with a better bunch of musicians".

Record World said of the single "Solid Rock" that "Dylan's latest inspiration is perhaps his greatest, as evidenced by this compelling rocker."

In 2014, Tom Hawking of Flavorwire included the album in his list of "The 50 Worst Albums Ever Made", in which he said the album was "proof that even our greatest songwriters fall to pieces when they try to make Christian music."

== Track listing ==
All tracks are written by Bob Dylan, except where noted.

Side one
No.	Title	Writer(s)	Recorded	Length
1.	"A Satisfied Mind"	Red Hayes, Jack Rhodes	February 12, 1980	1:57
2.	"Saved"	Tim Drummond, Bob Dylan	February 12, 1980	4:00
3.	"Covenant Woman"		February 15, 1980	6:02
4.	"What Can I Do for You?"		February 12, 1980	5:54
5.	"Solid Rock"		February 12, 1980	3:55
Total length:				21:48

Side two
No.	Title	Recorded	Length
1.	"Pressing On"	February 13, 1980	5:11
2.	"In the Garden"	February 14, 1980	5:58
3.	"Saving Grace"	February 13, 1980	5:01
4.	"Are You Ready"	February 14, 1980	4:41
Total length:			20:51

== Personnel ==
- Bob Dylan – guitar, harmonica, keyboards, vocals
- Carolyn Dennis – backing vocals
- Tim Drummond – bass guitar
- Regina Havis – backing vocals
- Jim Keltner – drums
- Clydie King – backing vocals
- Spooner Oldham – keyboards
- Fred Tackett – guitar
- Monalisa Young – backing vocals
- Terry Young – keyboards, backing vocals

Technical

- Barry Beckett – production
- Gregg Hamm – engineering
- Bobby Hata – mastering
- Mary Beth McLemore – assistant engineering
- Arthur Rosato – photography
- Jerry Wexler – production
- Paul Wexler – mastering supervision
- Tony Wright – artwork

== Releases ==
Originally released in 1980 on LP and cassette, the album was first reprinted in 1985 and released on CD in 1990. Saved was remastered in 2013 for the release of The Complete Album Collection Vol. One.
