= Forever Young (Bob Dylan song) =

1974 song by Bob Dylan

Song by Bob Dylan

from the album Planet Waves
- Released: January 17, 1974
- Recorded: November 1973, California
- Genre: Rock
- Length: 4:57
- Label: Asylum
- Songwriter: Bob Dylan
- Producer: Rob Fraboni

Audio
- "Forever Young" (studio version) on YouTube

"Forever Young"
- German single cover

Single by Bob Dylan

from the album Bob Dylan at Budokan
- B-side: "All Along the Watchtower" "I Want You"
- Released: June 22, 1979
- Genre: Rock
- Length: 5:27
- Label: Columbia
- Songwriter: Bob Dylan
- Producer: Don DeVito

Bob Dylan singles chronology
| "Changing of the Guards" (1978) | "Forever Young" (1979) | "Gotta Serve Somebody" (1979) |

Audio
- "Forever Young" (live, from Bob Dylan at Budokan) on YouTube
- "Forever Young" (live, 28 February 1978 on YouTube
- "Forever Young" (live, 1 March 1978 on YouTube

"Forever Young" is a song by Bob Dylan, recorded in California in November 1973. The song first appeared, in two different versions, as both slow-pace and fast-pace, on Dylan's fourteenth studio album Planet Waves.

A demo version of the song, recorded in New York City in June 1973, was included on Dylan's 1985 compilation Biograph. In the notes included with that album, Dylan is quoted as saying that he wrote "Forever Young" in Tucson, Arizona, "thinking about" one of his sons and "not wanting to be too sentimental".

A live version of the song, recorded in Tokyo on 28 February 1978 and included on Dylan's album Bob Dylan at Budokan, was released as a European single in 1979.

== Analysis ==
Written as a lullaby for his eldest son Jesse, born in 1966, Dylan's song relates a father's hopes that his child will remain strong and happy. It opens with the lines, 'May God bless and keep you always / May your wishes all come true', echoing the priestly blessing from the Book of Numbers, which has lines that begin: 'May the Lord bless you and guard you / May the Lord make His face shed light upon you.' Not wishing to sound 'too sentimental', Dylan included two versions of the song on the album Planet Waves, one a lullaby and the other more rock-oriented.

In notes on "Forever Young" written for the 2007 album Dylan, Bill Flanagan writes that Dylan and the Band "got together and quickly knocked off an album, Planet Waves, that featured two versions of a blessing from a parent to a child. In the years he was away from stage, Dylan had become a father. The song was memorably recited on American television by Howard Cosell when Muhammad Ali won the heavyweight crown for the third time."

== Live performances ==
According to his website, Dylan performed the song live 493 times between its live debut in 1974 and its last outing in 2011. This includes a duet with Bruce Springsteen at the Concert for the Rock and Roll Hall of Fame in Cleveland, OH in 1995. Dylan also performed the song live on the Late Show with David Letterman in 1993. Dylan and The Band, who originally recorded the song together for the Planet Waves album, performed "Forever Young" live at The Band's 1976 farewell concert, "The Last Waltz". This live performance was included in the concert film The Last Waltz, directed by Martin Scorsese.

== Share of royalties from Rod Stewart song ==
Rod Stewart recorded a song also titled "Forever Young" that was released as a single and included on his 1988 album Out of Order. Stewart's manager, Arnold Stiefel, said, "[I]t would be fair to say that while the melody and the music is not at all the same [as Dylan's song], the idea of the song is similar. The architecture of the lyrics of the song is very much from Dylan–there are definite similarities." The similarities were enough to cause Stiefel to contact Dylan, who requested a share of the royalties, and Stewart agreed. His version charted at No. 12 on the Billboard Hot 100 in the US, while it made No. 57 on the UK Singles Chart upon its release in 1988, and No. 55 on re-release in 2013.

== Personnel ==
- Bob Dylan – guitar, piano, harmonica, vocals
- Rick Danko – bass guitar
- Levon Helm – drums, mandolin
- Garth Hudson – organ
- Richard Manuel – piano, drums
- Robbie Robertson – guitar

== Cover versions ==
In 1974, Joan Baez covered "Forever Young" as a single. It reached No. 13 on the US Adult Contemporary chart.

Michael Jackson's sister Rebbie Jackson covered "Forever Young" for the Free Willy 2: The Adventure Home soundtrack in 1995.

The Pretenders covered "Forever Young" for the With Honors soundtrack and later included it on their album Last of the Independents in 1994. This version also appeared on the Free Willy 2: The Adventure Home soundtrack alongside Rebbie Jackson's version in 1995.

In August 2026, Hothouse Flowers singer Liam Ó Maonlaí performed the song with Eddie Vedder, Bono, The Edge, and many other singers to close out the funeral of singer Glen Hansard.

== Louisa Johnson version ==
"Forever Young"

Single by Louisa Johnson
- Released: 13 December 2015
- Recorded: December 2015
- Length: 3:23
- Label: Syco; Sony
- Songwriter: Bob Dylan
- Producers: Julian Bunetta; John Ryan; Afterhrs

Louisa Johnson singles chronology
| "Forever Young" (2015) | "Tears" (2016) |

Live video
- "Forever Young" (2015, at The X-Factor UK) on YouTube

Audio
- "Forever Young" (studio version) on YouTube

In December 2015, Louisa Johnson, the winner of the twelfth series of The X Factor, released a cover version of "Forever Young" as her winner's single. It was released on December 13, 2015, immediately after Johnson won. Johnson performed the song live on The X Factor final. She also performed it on Text Santa. Johnson's version entered the UK Singles Chart on December 18 at number nine, and was the first X Factor winner single not to reach number one in the UK; however, it was at the top for 5 weeks on the official Physical Singles Chart during holiday season 2015 and into early 2016. The song had sold 99,648 copies in the UK as of June 2016.

=== Track listing ===
CD single
| No. | Title | Length |
|---|---|---|
| 1. | "Forever Young" |
| 2. | "God Only Knows" |
| 3. | "Let It Go" |
| 4. | "Forever Young" (Instrumental) |

=== Chart performance ===
| Chart (2015) | Peak position |
|---|---|
| Ireland (IRMA) | 5 |
| Scottish Singles Sales (Official Charts) | 2 |
| UK Singles (Official Charts) | 9 |

=== Release history ===
| Region | Date | Format | Label |
|---|---|---|---|
| United Kingdom | December 13, 2015 | Digital download; CD single | Syco; Sony |

== Parenthood ==
Dylan lent his name, voice, and song as the theme to the television show Parenthood. Lucy Schwartz sang "When We Were Young" in seasons 1–6 internationally. On August 31, 2010, Arrival Records/Scion Music Group released a soundtrack for Parenthood. The soundtrack includes both theme songs for Parenthood, "Forever Young" by Bob Dylan, and the international theme, "When We Were Young" by Lucy Schwartz. It also includes a cover of "Forever Young" performed by John Doe and Lucy Schwartz. Rhiannon Giddens and Iron & Wine's version appeared in the series finale titled "May God Bless and Keep You Always" which in-turn derives from the opening lyric to "Forever Young".

== Children's book ==
The lyrics to "Forever Young" were published as a children's book along with illustrations by illustrator Paul Rogers. Rogers' visual interpretation of "Forever Young" includes references to Bob Dylan's life and livelihood juxtaposed against the backdrop of the social and political climate.
