= Carolyn Dennis =

American singer (born 1954)

- Born: April 12, 1954 (age 72)
- Occupations: Singer; actress
- Spouse: Bob Dylan (m. 1986; div. 1992)
- Children: 1
- Musical career
- Genre: Rock
- Years active: 1978–2005

Carolyn Dennis (born April 12, 1954), sometimes known professionally as Carol Dennis or Carol Dennis-Dylan, is an American singer.

== Career ==
Dennis sang backup on most of Bob Dylan's albums during the era between Street-Legal (1978) and Down in the Groove (1988). She has also sung backup for Wonderlove, Minnie Riperton, Táta Vega, The Carpenters, Kenny Loggins, Bruce Springsteen, and Michael Jackson's HIStory: Past, Present and Future, Book I. In 1982, Dennis performed the role of Poppea in a modern adaptation of Monteverdi's L'Incoronazione di Poppea (The Coronation of Poppea) at Xenon Discothèque in New York City. She was the singing voice for the 1991 made-for-television movie The Josephine Baker Story starring Lynn Whitfield as Josephine Baker. Dennis was also part of the performance group the Young Americans.

On Broadway, she was a member of the original cast of musicals including Big River (1985) and The Color Purple (2005).

== Personal life ==
Dennis married Bob Dylan in June 1986; she was Dylan's second wife. The two of them have a child, Desiree Gabrielle Dennis-Dylan, born on January 31, 1986. The couple divorced in October 1992.

Their marriage and parenthood was unknown to both Dylan's fans and the media until the 2001 publication of Down the Highway: The Life of Bob Dylan by Howard Sounes.
