= Street-Legal (album) =

Studio album by Bob Dylan
- Released: June 15, 1978
- Recorded: April 25–May 1, 1978
- Studio: Rundown (Santa Monica)
- Genre: Rock
- Length: 49:56
- Label: Columbia
- Producer: Don DeVito

Bob Dylan chronology
Masterpieces (1978)	Street-Legal (1978)	Bob Dylan at Budokan (1978)

Bob Dylan studio album chronology
Desire (1976)	Street-Legal (1978)	Slow Train Coming (1979)

Singles from Street-Legal
- 1. "Baby, Stop Crying" Released: July 31, 1978; 2. "Is Your Love in Vain?" Released: September 29, 1978 (UK only); 3. "Changing of the Guards" Released: October 24, 1978

Street-Legal is the eighteenth studio album by American singer-songwriter Bob Dylan. It was released on June 15, 1978, through Columbia Records. The album was produced by Don DeVito and recorded at Rundown Studios, Dylan's own makeshift recording space. A diversion from the sound of previous albums, the record features the use of a large pop rock band including backing vocalists and horns.

Upon release, Street-Legal received harsh reviews from the American press, but critics in the UK were more positive. Retrospective reviews are also much more positive, though it continues to receive criticism for its production. In the US, the album was less commercially successful than Dylan's past few releases, though it still reached the top 10. The lead single, "Baby, Stop Crying", failed to chart in America but was a top 15 hit in the UK. DeVito remixed the album in 1999, which has led to further positive critical reevalution.

== Background ==
The years prior to 1978 saw Dylan undertake multiple large projects, including embarking on the Rolling Thunder Revue tour in 1975-76 and the creation of the film Renaldo and Clara (1978). His previous studio album Desire (1976) had been successful, reaching number one in the US, while the live album Hard Rain (1976) received less positive reviews and Renaldo and Clara was a critical failure. This period was also marked by personal upheaval for Dylan, as his first wife Sara would file for divorce in 1977.

== Writing and recording ==
According to biographer Clinton Heylin, Dylan undertook three "distinct" periods of songwriting prior to the recording of Street-Legal. The first of these is a group of compositions inspired by his recent divorce; a song entitled "I'm Cold" is the only known remnant from these writing sessions. The second is the only group to be represented on the final album, a collection of songs written in the summer of 1977 on Dylan's Minnesota farm. The third is a group of co-writes with backing vocalist Helena Springs written in the spring and summer of 1978, with a few of the earlier songs from this partnership being under consideration for, but ultimately excluded from, Street-Legal. Heylin also notes the existence of a fourth group of songs written later in 1978, demoed at tour rehearsals for a prospective follow-up to Street-Legal but ultimately never used following Dylan's conversion to Christianity.

On December 26, 1977, Dylan would partake in a session at Rundown where he would run through the songs for Street-Legal on piano. Many of these compositions were still works in progress. For instance, the melody of "No Time to Think" was "quite different" from its final form, and the lyrics contained inconsistent numbers of lines within verses. Heylin believes "True Love Tends to Forget" and "We Better Talk This Over" to be companion songs, due in part to Dylan playing them back-to-back at this session. Both songs were also still works in progress, though the latter was closer to completion than the former. "Is Your Love in Vain?" was absent from this session, but would become the first Street-Legal composition played in concert, and the only to be debuted live before the release of the album.

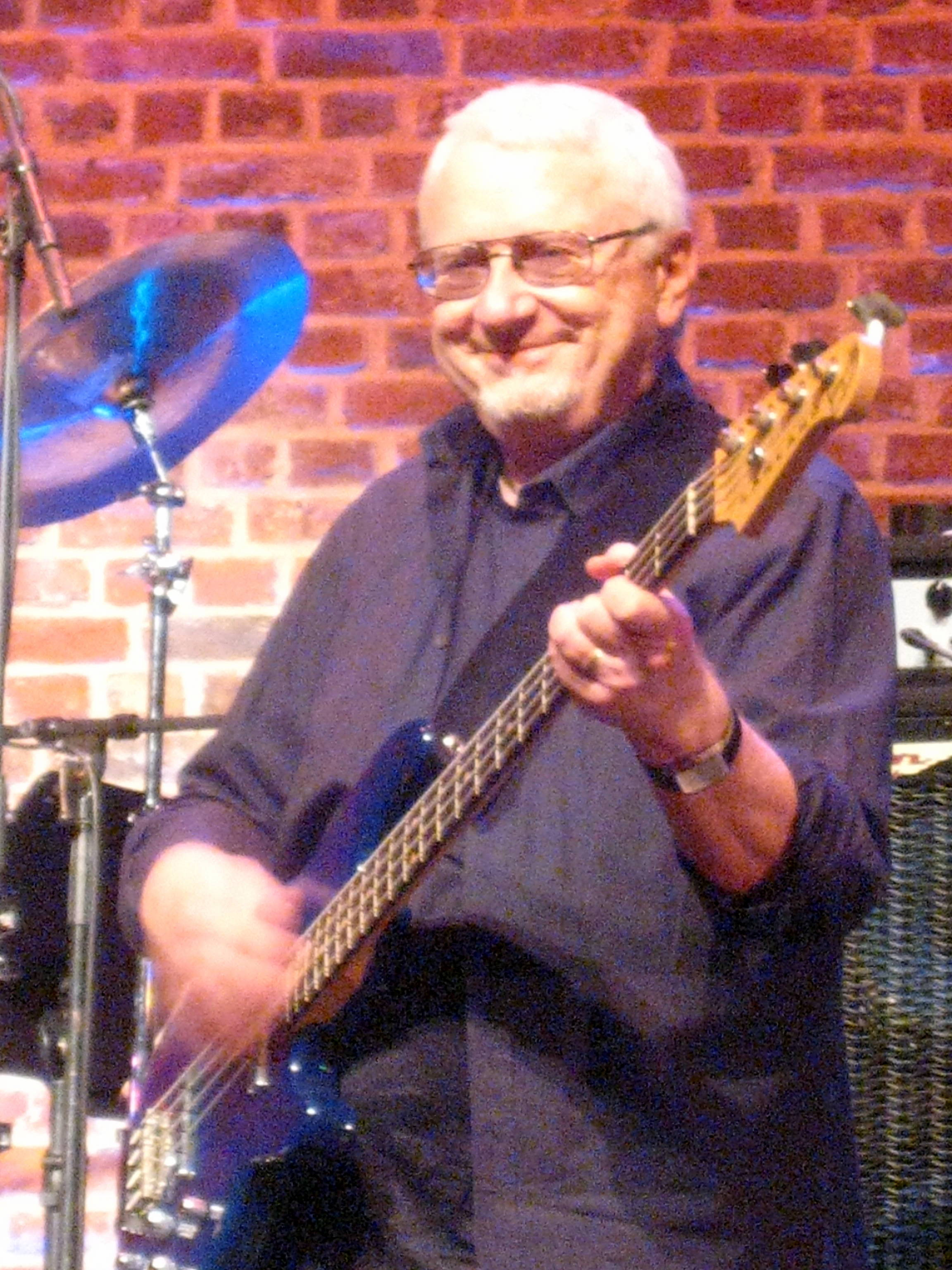
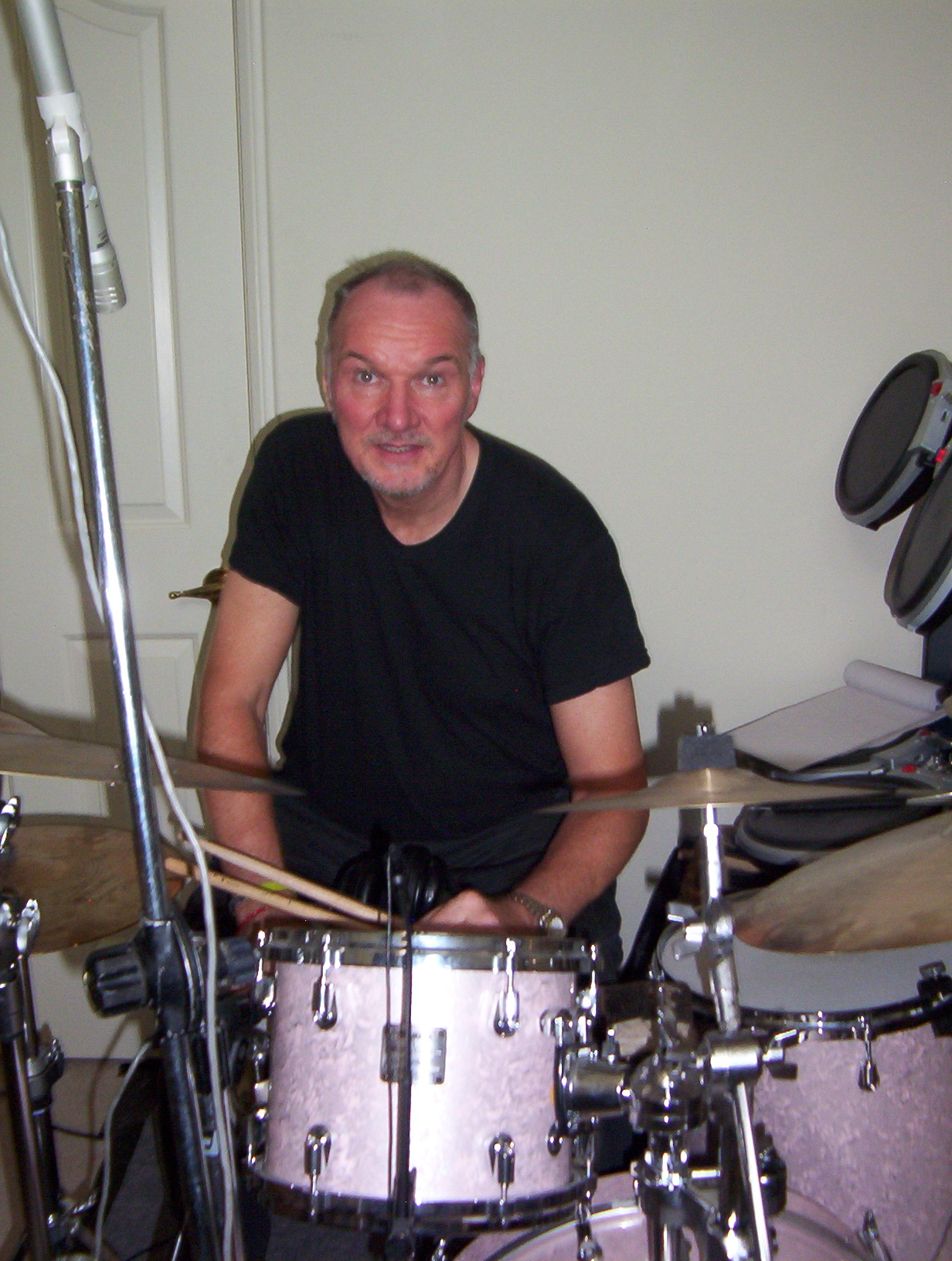
Among the musicians appearing on Street-Legal are bassist Jerry Scheff (left) and drummer Ian Wallace (right).

The songs included on the album were to be registered through a newly-formed publishing company, Special Rider Music, and the new album would be Dylan's first under a "recently renegotiated" contract with Columbia. When asked in a 1978 interview if his new songs referenced his recent divorce, Dylan stated "we were breaking up for a long time. So [the next album] doesn't reflect too much of that." According to Heylin, "Changing of the Guards" was not only "definitely" the first song recorded for Street-Legal, but also that there exists "a goodly amount of circumstantial evidence" that it was also the earliest-written composition on the record. "Where Are You Tonight? (Journey Through Dark Heat)" is another song "almost certainly conceived" at Dylan's farm, which he then "atypically spen[t] sixth months fine-tuning". A song entitled "First to Say Goodbye" was mentioned in a Melody Maker report discussing rehearsals for the upcoming tour, but does not appear on tapes from those sessions. Heylin suggests the title may match a song recorded at the December 1977 session but not included on the album; Dylan also mentioned a song entitled "Her Version of Jealousy" in a March 1978 interview, but no recordings have ever been released. Another Dylan–Springs collaboration, "Stop Now" appears to have been under heavy consideration for the album's final tracklisting, but was not included.

With a tour booked to start in June, and the band expecting a break in the interim between recording and touring, the album needed to be recorded quickly. The record would ultimately be recorded within a week in April at Rundown Studios, Dylan's makeshift studio in Santa Monica. Dylan had originally intended to reunite with producer Bob Johnston and record the album at the Record Plant in Sausalito, California. However, he was unable to book "convenient" dates at the studio, so the decision was made to instead record the album at Rundown. Dylan himself later recalled that he did not want to record there, but had to out of necessity. Dylan desired a "naturalistic approach to recording that maintained the interplay between each musician", with Arthur Rosato (listed on the album sleeve as "second-in-command") later remarking that despite the fact that recording an album live in the studio had, by 1978, become "all but unheard of", Dylan insisted on recording this way, using a mobile truck with 24-track recording equipment. He was also "uninterested" in overdubbing vocals, and placed "distinct limits" on the musicians' abilities to overdub.

Heylin notes that "if writing the Street-Legal songs in many ways mirrored the Blood on the Tracks experience, the recording sessions resembled his previous attempt to record with a big band, at the early Desire sessions." According to Sounes, the acoustics of Rundown were "terrible", due in part to its linoleum floor and polystyrene ceiling. David Mansfield recalls Dylan growing impatient with the engineering assistants during the recording process, leading to the recording crew having to "scramble" to quickly position microphones and record, resulting in what Heylin calls a "poorly recorded" album. Heylin suggests that Dylan "heard all these great-sounding tapes" from the January rehearsals "and presumably felt that, if they could make tapes like that on a shitty eight-track, recording with one of Wally Heider's mobile trucks would be a sea breeze." Floor-mounted monitors were used instead of headphones, which Heylin describes as a "no-no, purely on technical grounds." Rosato suspended a parachute above drummer Ian Wallace to deaden the sound of his kit. Robert Shelton notes the presence of "technical raw spots" on the album, attributing this to Dylan's desire to "tape it red-hot and from the heart" and the only-week-long recording span. According to Sounes, Dylan "enjoyed working at a brisk clip, and was not overly concerned about sound quality".

The last Street-Legal session was on May 1, which saw the recording of "New Pony", "Walk Out in the Rain" and the also-unused "Coming from the Heart". Overdubs to "Baby, Stop Crying" were then added on May 2. Two Dylan–Springs collaborations, "If I Don't Be There by Morning" and "Walk Out in the Rain", were recorded on May 1 and 2, respectively, but not included on Street-Legal. Both were later recorded by Eric Clapton for his album Backless (1978).

== Music and lyrics ==
Sounes describes the songs on Street-Legal as being "concerned primarily with the travails of love", with their "autobiographical references" being obscured by "dense imagery" and references to Tarot and astrology. Shelton considers the collection to be one of Dylan's "most overtly autobiographical" records, containing themes of "loss, searching, estrangement and exile" while also foreshadowing Dylan's conversion to Christianity and the gospel albums which would follow. Writer Michael Gray agrees that the album predicts Dylan's later religious music, as well as noting the multitude of personalities contained within its compositions. Gray notes betrayal as a central theme on the record, opining the album deals both with "Dylan's being betrayed like Christ", and his "need to abandon woman's love". Jeremy Winograd divides the album's tracks into two lyrical categories: one being "cranky, bitchy songs about Dylan's divorce", and the other being "long, convoluted epics that take obscure Dylanesque wordplay to a whole new level."

Musically, Street-Legal is a diversion from previous Dylan albums in its use of an expanded band lineup including backing vocalists and the use of a horn section. Some reviewers have noted a stronger pop influence and have described the musicianship as "slick" and "professional". Jim Beviglia of American Songwriter describes the record's musical aesthetic as a "big-band rock sound" similar to the contemporary work of Bruce Springsteen and Bob Seger. Winograd says Street-Legal "marks the time when Dylan decided for exactly one album to become a big band, Vegas-style adult pop crooner". Mansfield described the sound of the band as "like Bob Dylan meets Phil Spector". Contrasting these more commercial arrangements is the sound quality and production of the album, which has come under much criticism. Sounes describes its sound as "like it had been recorded under wet cardboard", while Heylin characterizes the record's sound quality as a "twenty-four track morass".

=== Side one ===
The album opens with "Changing of the Guards", considered by Winograd to be its "most ostensibly Dylanesque cut" due to its use of "wailing organ and verse–verse-verse folk song structure." Heylin describes the lyrics as a "Babylonian narrative of lust and betrayal, to a period of mortal combat". Shelton notes the "confound[ing]" and enigmatic nature of the lyrics, while Sounes highlights its references to Tarot as one of the record's prime instances of Dylan disguising his songs' autobiographical references. Heylin notes similarities between the song's verse structure and that of the previous album's "Black Diamond Bay", while also picking out lyrical references to Tom Paxton's "Peace Will Come" and Robert Johnson's "Last Fair Deal Gone Down". Michael Gray interprets the song as "Dylan reflecting on his own career", while exhibiting the album's theme of betrayal, in this case inflicted not by a romantic partner, but the world as a whole. Gray opines that later in the song, Dylan both addresses his record label and Sara, while other lyrics foreshadow his religious conversion. "New Pony" is a blues which many, including some in Dylan's band, have theorized refers to Dylan's relationship with Springs. Musical characteristics of the track include backing vocalists repeating the phrase "How much longer?", in addition to "muscular drumming pinning down" the song's "12-bar structure". Brian Hinton describes the song as "certainly part inspired by Son House's 'Pony Blues' with a bit of satanism thrown in", while Gray considers it to be the "dark, spiteful corollary" of the similarly blues-influenced "Buckets of Rain" (from Blood on the Tracks). Gray also highlights the juxtaposition of Dylan's "sexy, sleazy" vocal performance with the "gospel plea for deliverance" offered by the backing vocalists as a prime example of the album's "tussle between flesh and spirit".

"No Time to Think" is the album's longest track, described by Heylin as an "eighteen-verse opus" similar to "Changing of the Guards" in its ambition and complex structure. Hinton likens the track to "All I Really Want to Do" (1964) as a "catalogue song", while he quotes writer Paul Williams as characterizing the lyrics as a "disintegration of a subjective, personal reality rather than any kind of prophetic vision of the world", noting that something appears to be "catching up with the person singing the song". According to Gray, who describes the musical backing as a "hypnotic yet ridiculous" waltz, the song tackles the "noisy, mechanical going-nowhere of 'real life'", highlighted by "incandescent jingle-jangles of internal rhyme". Heylin believes that the most appropriate comparison for "No Time to Think" is not another musical composition, but instead Renaldo and Clara, noting the "mythical" setting and dreamlike narrative of the song. "Baby, Stop Crying" further examines themes of "betrayal and salvation", seeing Dylan urge a woman to "join him down the new road to salvation", rather than continue with her current, spiritually-shallow lifestyle. Heylin considers the song to be a re-write of Robert Johnson's "Stop Breaking Down", also calling it a torch ballad. Matt Melis of Paste interprets the track as Dylan "offering a hand to an old love against better judgment", with a vocal arrangement that continues the juxtaposition of Dylan's own "gruff" style and the backing vocalists; Beviglia likens Dylan's performance to Otis Redding.

=== Side two ===
"Is Your Love in Vain?" opens side two, and is another song for which biographers have drawn connections to Robert Johnson. Hinton considers the track to be a rewrite of Johnson's "Love in Vain", characterized by a weary vocal performance and a narrator lacking in confidence. Heylin notes that the song's "confessional tone" invokes the themes of earlier compositions such as "Abandoned Love" and "You're a Big Girl Now"; he also finds the song to contain a sense of honesty which was "largely absent" from Desire. Gray summarizes the lyrics as a series of "plain, urgent, [and] selfish" questions borne out of the narrator's "yearning for an earthly salvation", despite "rating earthly pleasures low". The lyric, "Can you cook and sew, make flowers grow / Do you understand my pain?" has received criticism for its perceived sexism and male chauvinism. "Señor (Tales of Yankee Power)" has received a multitude of interpretations, ranging from a commentary on the Vietnam War to a more personal composition making reference to the American dream. Gray argues that the song extends Dylan's album-long quest for personal salvation to the entirety of America, with lyrics containing the "American instinct for survival" sung from the point of view of "the voice of post-Vietnam America". Multiple writers have compared the track to the work of the Eagles. Heylin considers the composition to really be "two separate songs" in one, with one being "a conversation with a mysterious, all-seeing figure who allows the singer to expend himself asking questions, without answering a single one" and the other, contained within the bridges, being "more Dylanesque", finding the narrator at a personal crossroads "on the boulevard of broken American dreams".

Heylin considers "True Love Tends to Forget" and "We Better Talk This Over" to be "twin" songs. Hinton describes "True Love Tends to Forget" as "a song about being half in love", comparing its piano work to that of Highway 61 Revisited (1965). He goes on to describe "We Better Talk This Over" as "more of the same" from the previous track, this time characterizing its music as "'One Too Many Mornings' revisited, with bongos." In Gray's interpretation, "True Love Tends to Forget" sees Dylan recognize that "love has failed" him in regards to both the themes of betrayal and spiritual restlessness, with the song representing an "attempt to bid failed love goodbye". He notes that while Dylan's "resolve is not yet strong enough" on "True Love", the following song sees Dylan go "further on his resolve", "announc[ing], not to us but to his partner, that they must break up." The album closes with "Where Are You Tonight? (Journey Through Dark Heat)". In comparison to the previous songs on the album which address a romantic partner, Heylin notes the figure being spoken to within this song is Dylan himself; Heylin states that "Dylan's struggle with his Gemini nature lies at the heart of both the song and the album." Gray believes that "Where Are You Tonight?" sees Dylan ask his partner to make a spiritual pilgrimage alongside him, which she declines. Both Heylin and Hinton have noted further lyrical references to Robert Johnson, in this instance the song "Traveling Riverside Blues", while Hinton and Gray consider the song to be a heavy signifier of what is to come on the following Slow Train Coming (1979).

== Release and reception ==
In Europe, Street-Legal was released amidst much media hype, due to its release date being just two days after the beginning of Dylan's first European tour in twelve years. "Baby, Stop Crying" was released as a single and became a top 10 hit throughout Europe. In the UK, the album reached number two during a 20-week chart stay. However, the album stalled at number 11 in the US, breaking a streak of number-one studio albums, and "Baby, Stop Crying" failed to chart on the Billboard Hot 100.

=== Contemporary reviews ===
Professional ratings
Review scores
Source	Rating
AllMusic	3.5/5 stars
Christgau's Record Guide	C+
The Encyclopedia of Popular Music	3/5 stars
The Great Rock Discography	7/10
Paste	8.6/10
Record Mirror	4/5 stars
The Rolling Stone Album Guide	2/5 stars
Tom Hull	B−

After the twin critical successes of Blood on the Tracks and Desire, US reviews for Street-Legal were scathing. In a review for Rolling Stone, Greil Marcus disparaged the album, calling much of its material "dead air, or close to it" while criticizing the vocals as "utterly fake". Marcus dismissed "Is Your Love in Vain?" and "Baby, Stop Crying" as "wretched performances", while opining that its "most musically striking number", "Señor (Tales of Yankee Power)", is "really just a pastiche of the best moments of the Eagles' Hotel California." Robert Christgau gave the album a rating of C+, dismissing its "leaden tempos" and "opress[ed]" melodies, while considering the record as a whole to be "devoid not just of humor but of lightness".

The UK press was much more receptive. Record Business found the record to be "a work of considerable overall strength" and a "worthy" successor to Blood on the Tracks and Desire. The publication praised Dylan's use of female soul vocalists and "exhilirating R&B brass", while also identifying a return to the "anguished, personal, visionary imagery" of Highway 61 Revisited (1965). Barry Cain of Record Mirror rated the album four stars out of five, stating that while the record "ain't no leather bound, gold embossed classic", it "sure as hell would make a good movie", and contains songs which "paint disquieting scenarios that slither before the eyes kaleidoscope amoebas". NME writer Angus Mackinnon deemed Street-Legal to be Dylan's second major work of the decade, praising the musicianship and finding the songwriting to be "suffused with a rare compassion and tenderness" and evident of Dylan's ability to "effortlessly generalise the particular and particularise the general". Mackinnon compared the record favorably to Desire, finding it reminded them of "Dylan's continued relevance as a commentator and communicator".

=== Retrospective reviews ===
Retrospective reviews are also more positive. AllMusic's Stephen Thomas Erlewine dismissed the production, which he found conflicted with the tone of the songs, but also argued that the material "deserve[s] close attention" and contains writing "as dense as anything Dylan had written since before his motorcycle accident". In his Paste retrospective, Melis chalked up much of the album's artistic success to Dylan's attempts to "meld the artist listeners had come to know with the sounds he aimed to explore", as well as his "knack for stepping into an adjacent genre and not missing a single brilliant beat". While Melis acknowledged the "fair criticisms" levied at the record's "rushed recording" and "sloppy production", he ultimately argued the album "captures a still-fearless artist unafraid to take musical risks as his personal life comes crashing down around him". Jim Beviglia of American Songwriter also asserts that Street-Legal is an "overlooked gem", opining that the criticisms of sexism and of the record's arrangements are misguided. Beviglia posits that the musical setting of the record "add[s] to the drama and urgency of Dylan's narratives" in songs such as "Changing of the Guards" and "Baby, Stop Crying", while arguing for separation between the narrator of "Is Your Love in Vain?" and Dylan's own views, also noting that "what really comes through in the song is the narrator’s touching tentativeness to put himself out there for his heart to potentially be broken".

Chris Shields of the St. Cloud Times praised Street-Legal for combining the "colorful artistry" of Desire with the "fervent religious feeling" of Slow Train Coming (1979), identifying it as a transitional album which sees Dylan "either at his highest heights or his lowest lows, but pushing forward regardless". Shields notes the gospel elements as foreshadowing Dylan's soon-to-follow Christian albums, while also praising the "surreal lyrics" and imagery present on "Changing of the Guards" and "New Pony". Winograd argued that the record "is perhaps the most complex and mystifying entry in Dylan's catalog", as well as one of his "most rewarding" and "unabashedly tuneful". Conversely, Tom Hull, upon revisiting the album in 2014, gave it a rating of B−, citing it as evidence of Dylan "moving toward incoherence, with the big band and backing singers conspiring in the cover up". Dylan's biographers have also praised the album. Michael Gray declares it "one of Dylan's most important, complex and cohesive albums", praising both its "minor songs" and highlighting three of its tracks—"Changing of the Guards", "No Time to Think" and "Where Are You Tonight? (Journey Through Dark Heat)"— as "outstanding major works". Brian Hinton describes Street-Legal as "an album of huge poetic range and lyrical ambition, played competently and sung with edge-of-the-seat determination". Hinton is critical of the production, noting its "notoriously muddy sound", though he also praised the 1999 remix for "sound[ing] as good as" and having the same "punch" as the live performances of the material.

== Track listing ==
All tracks are written by Bob Dylan.

Side one
No.	Title	Recorded	Length
1.	"Changing of the Guards"	April 27, 1978	6:41
2.	"New Pony"	May 1, 1978	4:28
3.	"No Time to Think"	April 27, 1978	8:19
4.	"Baby, Stop Crying"	April 28, 1978	5:19
Total length:			25:10

Side two
No.	Title	Recorded	Length
1.	"Is Your Love in Vain?"	April 28, 1978	4:30
2.	"Señor (Tales of Yankee Power)"	April 28, 1978	5:42
3.	"True Love Tends to Forget"	April 27, 1978	4:14
4.	"We Better Talk This Over"	April 26, 1978	4:04
5.	"Where Are You Tonight? (Journey Through Dark Heat)"	April 27, 1978	6:16
Total length:			24:46

== Personnel ==
=== Musicians ===
- Bob Dylan – vocals, rhythm guitar
- Steve Douglas – tenor saxophone, soprano saxophone
- David Mansfield – violin, mandolin
- Alan Pasqua – keyboards
- Billy Cross – electric guitar
- Steven Soles – rhythm guitar, background vocals
- Jerry Scheff – bass guitar
- Ian Wallace – drums
- Bobbye Hall – percussion
- Carolyn Dennis, JoAnn Harris, Helena Springs – backing vocals
- Steve Madaio – trumpet on "Is Your Love in Vain?"

=== Technical personnel ===
- Don DeVito – "Captain in Charge"
- Biff Dawes – engineering
- Stan Kalina – mastering engineer at CBS Recording Studios in New York City
- Michael H. Brauer, Ryan Hewitt – remixing engineering (1999 edition)
- Filmways/Heider – recording studio
- Mary Alice Artes – "Queen Bee"
- Larry Kegan – "Champion of All Causes"
- Ava Megna – "Secretary of Goodwill"
- Arthur Rosato – "Second in Command"
- Danny Clifford – tour photographer

== Charts ==
=== Weekly charts ===
Chart (1978)	Peak position
Australian Albums (Kent Music Report)	5
Canada Top Albums/CDs (RPM)	4
Dutch Albums (Album Top 100)	5
German Albums (Offizielle Top 100)	16
New Zealand Albums (RMNZ)	7
Norwegian Albums (VG-lista)	3
Spanish Albums (AFE)	2
Swedish Albums (Sverigetopplistan)	4
UK Albums (Official Charts)	2
US Billboard 200	11

=== Year-end charts ===
Chart (1978)	Position
Canada Top Albums/CDs (RPM)	56
Dutch Albums (Album Top 100)	28
New Zealand Albums (RMNZ)	24

== Certifications ==
Region	Certification	Certified units/sales
Australia (ARIA)	Platinum	70,000^{^}
Canada (Music Canada)	Platinum	100,000^{^}
France (SNEP)	Gold	100,000^{*}
Norway (IFPI Norway)	Gold	50,000
United Kingdom (BPI)	Platinum	300,000^{^}
United States (RIAA)	Gold	500,000^{^}
^{*} Sales figures based on certification alone.^{^} Shipments figures based on certification alone.
