= Where Are You Tonight? (Journey Through Dark Heat) =

1978 song by Bob Dylan

Song by Bob Dylan

from the album Street-Legal
- Released: June 15, 1978
- Recorded: April 27, 1978
- Studio: Rundown Studios (Santa Monica, California)
- Genre: Rock
- Length: 6:16
- Label: Columbia
- Songwriter(s): Bob Dylan
- Producer(s): Don DeVito

Official audio
- "Where Are You Tonight? (Journey Through Dark Heat)" on YouTube

"Where Are You Tonight? (Journey Through Dark Heat)" is a song by American singer-songwriter Bob Dylan, which was released as the closing track on his 18th studio album Street-Legal (1978). The song was written by Dylan, and produced by Don DeVito. Dylan has said that the song is about the individual's "enemy within." Critical interpretations of the song have suggested that it references Dylan's divorce as well as foreshadowing or announcing his conversion to Christianity, which became evident in the religiously-focused projects that followed the album. Commentators have also opined that there are allusions in the lyrics to the work of Robert Johnson.

The final version of "Where Are You Tonight? (Journey Through Dark Heat)" was recorded on April 26, 1978, at Rundown Studios in Santa Monica, California, and released on Street-Legal in June of that year. The song received widespread acclaim from music critics and was highlighted as one of the album's strongest by several of them, with critics praising the lyrics, music and delivery. Later assessments have ranked the song as one of Dylan's 100 best. The album was remastered for releases, featuring the song, in 1999 and 2004. Dylan has performed the song live 33 times, all throughout 1978.

== Background and recording ==
Dylan wrote songs for Street-Legal, including "Where Are You Tonight? (Journey Through Dark Heat)", on his farm in Minnesota, the same place he had composed the songs on his 1974 album Blood on the Tracks. A version of the song was recorded at Rundown Studios in Santa Monica, California on December 26, 1977, during a session where Dylan was accompanied by Steven Soles on rhythm guitar and Rob Stoner on bass. Following three takes on April 26, 1978, the version ultimately released was recorded at Rundown Studios the following day, featuring a full band. It was produced by Don DeVito and engineered by Biff Dawes.

The song was released on June 15, 1978, as the final track on Dylan's 18th studio album Street-Legal. John Nogowski, writing about Street-Legal, says that Dylan seems to usually take care in the selection of the closing song for his albums. Clinton Heylin says the song is similar to two other tracks on the album, "Addressing recent traumas in the same convoluted code as 'Changing of the Guards' and 'No Time To Think', it shares their metaphorical approach". The album Street-Legal was remastered and remixed for a 1999 compact disc release, with a further 5.1 remix done for a Super Audio CD release in 2004. Both re-releases featured the song.

== Composition and lyrical interpretation ==
"Where Are You Tonight? (Journey Through Dark Heat)" is a rock track, with a "cinematic" opening.

In a March 1978 interview, a few weeks before recording the final version of "Where Are You Tonight? (Journey Through Dark Heat)" that was released on the album, Dylan told interviewer Barbara Kerr: "Each man struggles within himself. That is where the fight is ... If you can deal with the enemy within then no enemy without can stand a chance". Patrick Webster notes Dylan's statement alongside the song referring to a fight with a twin – an "enemy within". Heylin quoted from Dylan's interview with Kerr to support his view that the song is about "man at war with that most deadly enemy – the one within." Heylin noted that Dylan expressed similar comments to the ones he made to Kerr in an interview with Robert Shelton from around the same time, when Dylan told Shelton that "it's all in those last two verse of that last song."

Other lyrical allusions identified by Heylin were to "The Juice of the Forbidden Fruit", a traditional anti-drinking song that Alan Lomax had made a 1937 field recording of, and to Robert Johnson's "Travelling Riverside Blues" (1937). (Note: "Travelling Riverside Blues" was recorded in 1937. It was released in 1961.) Dylan's lyrics include "I bit into the root of forbidden fruit / With the juice running down my leg" and Johnson's song has: "You can squeeze my lemon 'til the juice run down my leg".

Michael Gray noted that the line "Horseplay and disease is killing me by degrees," echoes Johnson's description of the blues in "Preaching Blues (Up Jumped the Devil)" (1938) (Note: "Preaching Blues (Up Jumped the Devil)" was recorded by Johnson in 1936 and is a reworking of a Son House song. It was released in 1938.) as "a low-down achin' heart disease," and Dylan's "he should have stayed where his money was green" may reference Johnson's line "we can make our money green" in "Little Queen of Spades" (1937). (Note: "Little Queen of Spades" was recorded by Johnson in 1937. It was released the same year.)

Gray considered that the album Street-Legal was "surely a charting of Dylan's move to embracing Christ". The song's Biblical language ("sacrifice, demon, forbidden fruit, paradise") employed by Dylan was discussed by Biblical literature scholar Michael Gilmour, who argued that the track prefigured the religious focus of Dylan's next albums. Gilmour observed that the opening line of the song refers to a "long-distance train" and how Dylan's next album was entitled Slow Train Coming. R. Clifton Spargo and Anne Ream do not regard Street-Legal as an album with a Christian focus, though believe similarly to Gilmour that it was a "harbinger of things to come." Heylin, and authors Phillippe Margotin and Jean-Michel Guesdon, speculated that the references in the lyrics "I left town at dawn, with Marcel and St. John / Strong men belittled by doubt" are to St. John the Divine and Christian existentialist Gabriel Marcel.

Nogowski called the track "a sharply drawn, dramatic summation of all [Dylan] was going through at the time ... He was a troubled man, and he sounds like one here". The poet Stephen Scobie also felt that the song has an autobiographical element, and may refer to Dylan's divorce settlement in the line, "Your partners in crime hit me up for nickels and dimes". Law scholar Michael L. Perlin took the phrase "the law looks the other way" from the song to be "an example of what Dylan sees as the legal process' disinterest in truth".

== Critical reception ==
"Where Are You Tonight? (Journey Through Dark Heat)" was met with widespread acclaim from music critics. Jon Marlowe of The Miami News, in his track-by track review of Street-Legal, said of "Where Are You Tonight? (Journey Through Dark Heat)" that "but as [Dylan] wraps it all up, you just sit and listen in awe". The Montreal Gazette's Juan Rodriguez called the album "brilliant and ... personal", and, quoting lines that "Where Are You Tonight? (Journey Through Dark Heat)" says that the track "sets up a haunting, chilling atmosphere". Eric Shepherd in The Journal News and Ed Siegel in The Boston Globe both rated the song as one of Dylan's best, while Terry Lawson in The Journal-Herald said it "shows us he is still capable of genius. His longing for his missing object of desire is passionate and intense".

Mike Daly in The Age considered that "Where Are You Tonight? (Journey Through Dark Heat)" was one of six tracks on Street-Legal with the potential to be released as a single. The Guardian's Robin Deneslow felt that the backing singers' "hey hey hey" reduced the impact of the "honest and agonisingly tortured" song, but referred to this as a "minor concern". The organ playing was highlighted for praise in the Reading Evening Post's review.

For Jonathan Cott, the song brought to mind "the last work van Gogh painted before his suicide – a work unstable and charged with tempestuous excitement." Alan Light, quoting the line "Horseplay and disease is killing me by degrees", felt that the song is the sound of a man who has "hit the wall" and describes the track as a "real treasure" of Dylan's oeuvre. Mick Gold called the track "the album's masterpiece".

Jim Beviglia ranks "Where Are You Tonight? (Journey Through Dark Heat)" 51st in his 2013 assessment of the 100 best Dylan songs, saying that "nobody else was putting such fascinatingly unwieldy narrative into the typical verse-verse-chorus structure of rock songs at that point." The track was ranked 97th on Rolling Stone's 2016 ranking of the 100 greatest Dylan songs, with the staff describing it as foreshadowing Dylan's conversion to Christianity. Gray calls "Where Are You Tonight? (Journey Through Dark Heat)" one of "three major outstanding works" on Street-Legal, along with "Changing of the Guards" and "No Time to Think".

Edward Docx included the song on his 2021 list of "80 Bob Dylan songs everyone should know" in The Guardian.

Stereogum ran an article to coincide with Dylan's 80th birthday on May 24, 2021, in which 80 musicians were asked to name their favorite Dylan songs. The Hold Steady's Craig Finn selected "Where Are You Tonight? (Journey Through Dark Heat)", noting how the "closing track on Street-Legal begins with funky percussion before sliding into an easy groove. And it is this part that I love especially — the comfort and confidence of Dylan already deep in an astonishing career fronting a band with this knowing soulfulness. I’ve been listening to this song for many years, and I still don’t know what it’s exactly about, but it seems to mix the modern and personal with the ancient and biblical".

== Live performances ==
Dylan has performed "Where Are You Tonight? (Journey Through Dark Heat)" live 33 times. The first performance was on July 15, 1978, at Blackbushe Aerodrome; and the most recent was on December 9 of that year, when he played it at the Carolina Coliseum in Columbia, South Carolina.

== Credits and personnel ==
Credits adapted from the Bob Dylan All the Songs: The Story Behind Every Track book.

Musicians

- Bob Dylan – vocals, rhythm guitar
- Steve Douglas – soprano saxophone
- Alan Pasqua – organ
- Billy Cross – electric guitar
- Steven Soles – rhythm guitar, backing vocals
- Jerry Scheff – bass guitar
- Ian Wallace – drums
- Bobbye Hall – congas
- Carolyn Dennis – backing vocals
- JoAnn Harris – backing vocals
- Helena Springs – backing vocals

Technical personnel

- Don DeVito – producer
- Biff Dawes – sound engineering
