= Rita May =

Rita May may refer to:

- "Rita May" (song), a 1975 song by Bob Dylan
- Rita May (actress) (born 1942), British actress

== See also ==
- Rita Mae Brown (born 1944), American writer
