= Rita May (song) =

Single by Bob Dylan

from the album Masterpieces
- A-side: "Stuck Inside of Mobile with the Memphis Blues Again (live)"
- Released: November 30, 1976
- Recorded: July 30, 1975
- Studio: Columbia Recording Studio E, New York City
- Genre: Blues
- Length: 3:14
- Label: Columbia
- Songwriters: Bob Dylan; Jacques Levy (lyrics)
- Producer: Don DeVito

Bob Dylan singles chronology
"Mozambique" (1976)	"Rita May" (1976)	"Baby, Stop Crying" (1978)

"Rita May" (sometimes spelled as "Rita Mae") is a song by Bob Dylan, originally recorded during the sessions for the album Desire, but released only as the B-side of a single and on the compilation album Masterpieces. The song is based on the 1957 rockabilly song "Bertha Lou". Some listeners believe that the lyrics of the song refer to writer Rita Mae Brown, who had complained of the lack of opportunities for casual lesbian sex.

== Live version ==
Dylan rehearsed the song in New York City before the first leg of the Rolling Thunder Revue in 1975, a performance that was officially released on the Bob Dylan – The Rolling Thunder Revue: The 1975 Live Recordings box set released in 2019. The only time Dylan played the song live, however, came on the second leg of the Rolling Thunder Revue in New Orleans, Louisiana on May 3, 1976.

== Notable cover ==
"Rita May" was covered by Jerry Lee Lewis on his 1979 self-titled album.

== Other songs with the same title ==
Eric Clapton wrote a song titled "Rita Mae" which appears on his 1981 album Another Ticket and was also released as a single, reaching No. 18 on the Mainstream Rock chart.

== Personnel ==
Original Dylan version

- Bob Dylan – guitar, vocal, harmonica
- Emmylou Harris – vocal
- Rob Stoner – bass
- Howard Wyeth – drums
- Scarlet Rivera – violin
- Sheena Seidenberg – tambourine, congas
- Don DeVito – Producer
