= New Pony =

1978 song by Bob Dylan

Single by Bob Dylan

from the album Street-Legal
- A-side: "Baby, Stop Crying" (US/UK); "Changing of the Guards" (Europe)
- Released: June 15, 1978
- Recorded: May 1 and 3, 1978
- Studio: Rundown (Santa Monica, California)
- Genre: Blues
- Label: Columbia
- Songwriter: Bob Dylan
- Producer: Don DeVito

"New Pony" is a blues song by American singer-songwriter Bob Dylan, which was released on his 18th studio album Street-Legal (1978). It was also released as the B-side to "Baby, Stop Crying" in the US and UK, and "Changing of the Guards" in Europe. The song was written by Dylan, and produced by Don DeVito. The song, which superficially concerns a pony called Lucifer who has broken a leg and needs to be put down, but has been interpreted as concerning Dylan's relationship with his backing singer Helena Springs. The song's composition is thought to have been influenced by earlier blues songs such as Son House's "Black Pony Blues" and Charley Patton's track "Pony Blues."

The track has received a mixed critical reception. Dylan has never performed "New Pony" live in concert.

== Background and recording ==
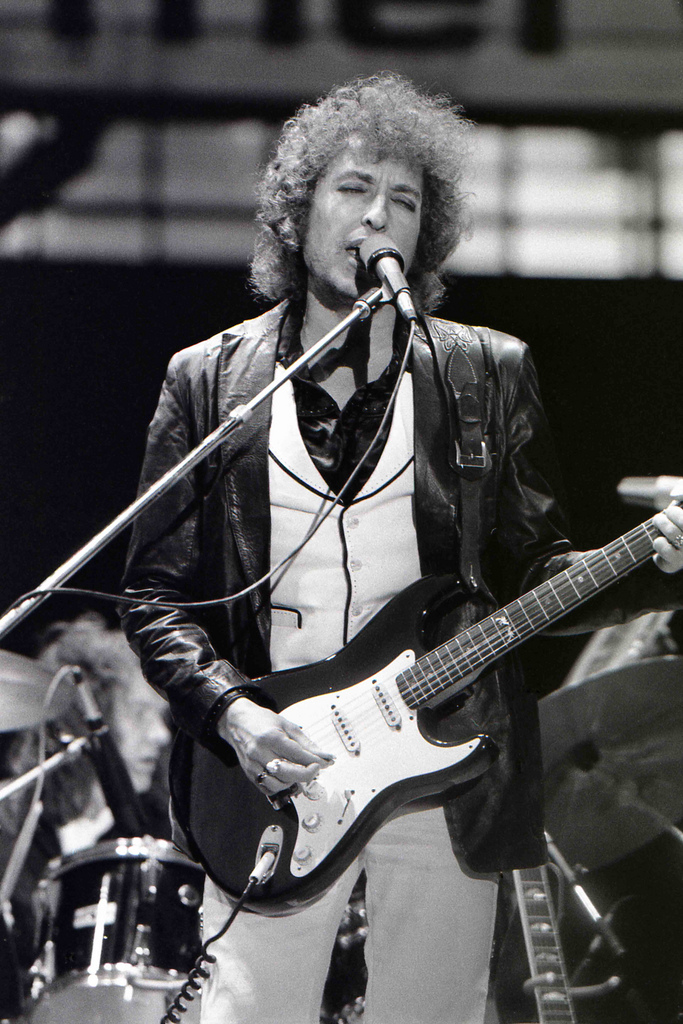
Bob Dylan, performing on June 23, 1978

Dylan wrote songs for his album Street-Legal, including "New Pony", on his farm in Minnesota, the same place he had composed the songs on his 1974 album Blood on the Tracks. "New Pony" is a lustful blues song, using double-entendres and religious imagery. Versions of "New Pony" were recorded at Rundown Studios in Santa Monica, California on April 26 and 28. The version that appears on Street-Legal was recorded on May 1, 1978, and bass and saxophones overdubs recorded on May 3. The track was produced by Don DeVito and engineered by Biff Dawes. The song was released on June 15, 1978, on Dylan's 18th studio album Street-Legal, and as the b-side of the single "Baby, Stop Crying. The album was remastered and remixed for a 1999 compact disc release, with a further 5.1 remix done for a Super Audio CD release in 2004. Both re-releases featured the song.

== Composition and lyrical interpretation ==
"New Pony" ostensibly concerns a pony named Lucifer who needs to be put down after breaking a leg. As is common for a blues song, the second line of each verse is the same (with minor differences) as the first line. The first verse is

I had a pony, her name was Lucifer (x2)
She broke her leg and needed shooting
I swear it hurt me more than it could have hurted her"

The song is thought to be inspired by Dylan's relationship with his backing singer Helena Springs. Dylan told Jonathan Cott in 1978 that "the Miss X in that song is Miss X, not ex-". He also agreed with Cott's suggestion that in songs like "New Pony" and "Buckets of Rain", that he had mixed in and changed different musical genres. The song probably draws on Son House's "Black Pony Blues", also recorded by Arthur "Big Boy" Crudup, and on Charley Patton's track Pony Blues. "Black Pony Blues" includes the lyrics "he can foxtrot / He can lope and pace, lope and pace", whilst Dylan's song has "I got a new pony, she knows how to foxtrot, lope and pace". House performed "Black Pony Blues" at the 1964 Newport Folk Festival, and Dylan may have seen the performance.

The backing singers sing "How much longer?" a number of times throughout the song. Christopher Ricks wrote that this "may be mostly a question about how much longer you will be satisfied with your new pony-woman and not have to shoot her to put her out of her misery before you can get some other new pony". David Yaffee notes that the backing singers include both Dylans's girlfriend at the time, Springs, and his future wife, Carolyn Dennis. He suggests that Dylan's performance is "goaded on" by the phrase repeated by the backing vocalists. Academic Aidan Day praised the "stridency of the blues melody .. matched by the roughness of its words. Both are germane to the conceptual sophistication of the song." Day noted that poet and critic Stephen Scobie wrote that "The image of the woman as a horse needing to be tamed and broke, while undoubtedly problematic from any contemporary feminist view, is a traditional image, from a long line of blues songs". Scobie suggested that the pony in the song appears in three different situations: "as victim, as aesthetic display and as the object of sexual desire". The first of these is expressed in the opening verse about breaking a leg, the second in the verse about being able to foxtrot and lope, and thirdly when described in the lyrics as "bad and nasty", after the song's narrator has proclaimed that they want to "climb up one time on you". Howard Wilde, another scholar, finds the element of misogyny unsurprising, given that Dylan and other members of "the first generation of rock auteurs were predominantly male".

Chris Shields of the St. Cloud Times wrote in 2015 of the two Street Legal tracks "Changing of the Guards" [and] "New Pony" that "the gospel elements found throughout both are clear signposts of what would be coming in the Born Again trilogy of albums coming next". Dylan's next studio album, Slow Train Coming, in 1979, was the first of his three consecutive Christian albums. Before the release of that trilogy's third component, Shot of Love in 1981, musicologist Wilfrid Mellers considered "New Pony" too sexually charged to be a gospel song.

Dylan has never performed the song live in concert. The only known performance since his studio recording was at a soundcheck in Paris on July 4, 1978. In that rehearsal, Dylan included a verse that has "It was early in the mornin'; I seen your shadow on the door / Now I don't have to ask nobody, I know what you came here for". Heylin wrote that this echoes "Me and the Devil Blues" by Robert Johnson. According to Heylin, the verse was edited out of the album version, and he speculates that this was due to time constraints.

== Critical reception ==
"New Pony" has received a mixed critical reception. Eric Shepherd in The Journal News wrote that "New Pony" "fuses a mysterious power of man, woman and horse through a dark, sexual power, perfectly expressed within a simple blues form." Authors Philippe Margotin and Jean-Michel Guesdon admired the "heavy rhythm section and exceptional guitars", and highlighted the solos by Billy Cross on guitar and Steve Douglas on tenor saxophone. David Murray praised the "swampland blues beat" and the solo by Cross in his Reading Evening Post review. Shields said that the track exemplified that "Dylan's surreal lyrics and use of imagery were intact."

The track and album were favorably reviewed by Jon Marlowe of The Miami News, who in his track-by track review of Street-Legal, wrote that "with Bob barking the vocal ... the backing singers frantically chant 'How much longer?'" The Guardian's Robin Deneslow felt that for "New Pony" and "Baby Stop Crying", the gospel-like voices were "used effectively to highlight the anguish". Keith Phipps and Steven Hayden described "New Pony" as "perhaps Dylan's dirtiest sex song". Nigel Williamson admired the track's "deliciously lustful carnality", and Mike Daly in The Age felt that the "thinly disguised eroticism" was part of an enjoyable "gutsy blues-rock". Greil Marcus panned the album in Rolling Stone, and opined that "the only hint of decent singing comes in the first four verses of 'New Pony'". Ed Siegel in The Boston Globe dismissed "New Pony" as "laughable", and The Journal-Herald's Terry Lawson called it a "nonsense blues." The track is one of two cited as examples of Dylan's weaker songs by Spencer Kornhaber in a 2016 piece for The Atlantic.

== Credits and personnel ==
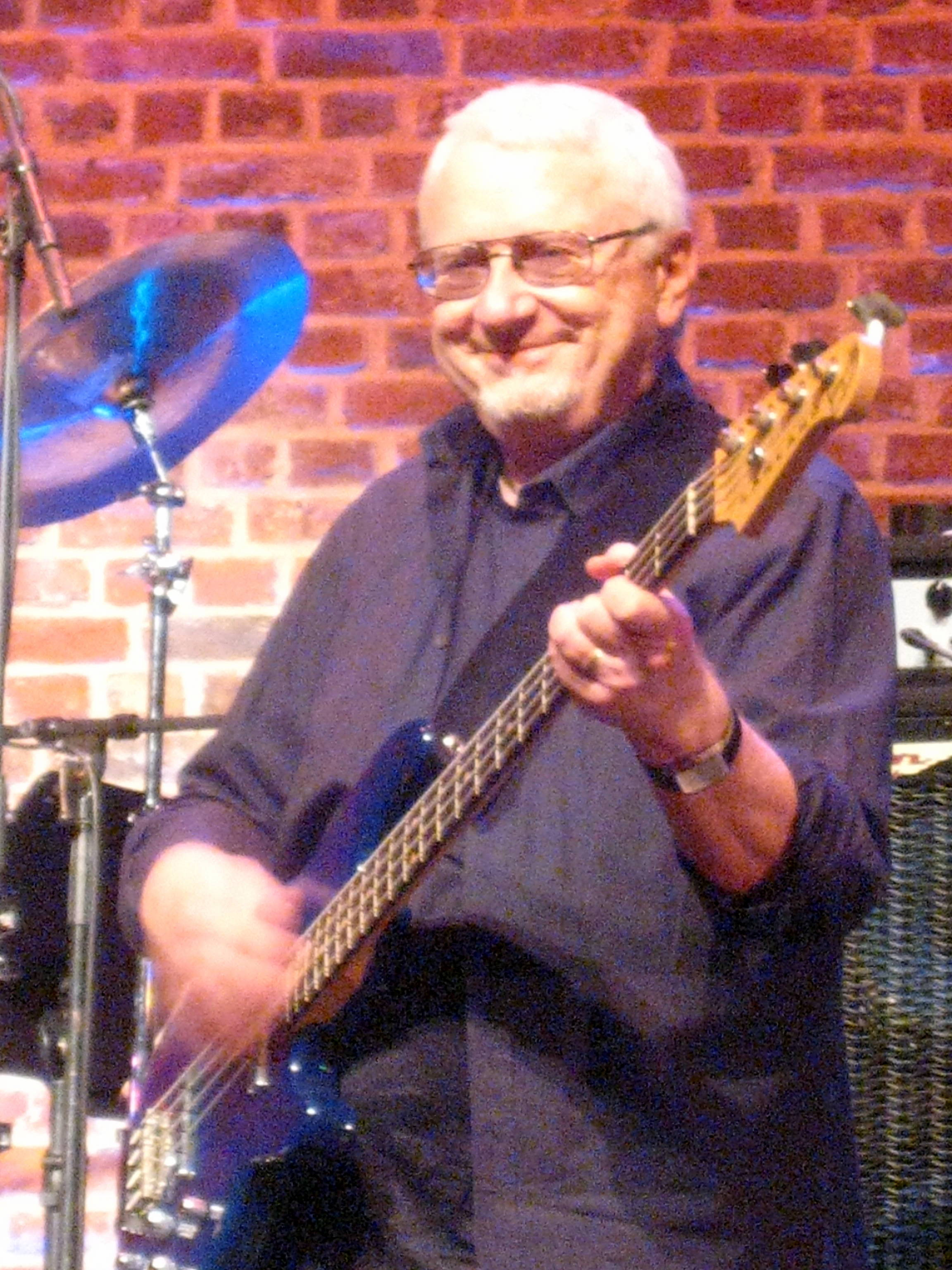
Jerry Scheff (pictured in 2008) played bass on the song

Credits adapted from the Bob Dylan All the Songs: The Story Behind Every Track book.

Musicians

- Bob Dylan – vocals, electric guitar
- Billy Cross – electric guitar
- Steve Douglas – tenor saxophone
- Jerry Scheff – bass guitar
- Ian Wallace – drums
- Bobbye Hall – tambourine
- Carolyn Dennis – backing vocals
- JoAnn Harris – backing vocals
- Helena Springs – backing vocals

Technical personnel

- Don DeVito – producer (Note: DeVito is credited on the Street-Legal liner notes as "Captain in Charge". Arthur Rosato is credited as "Second in Command".)
- Biff Dawes – sound engineering
- Stan Kalina – mastering engineer

== Covers ==
The Dead Weather included a cover of "New Pony" on their 2009 album Horehound. A review in The Independent said that Dean Fertita of the band's contribution turned the "nonsensical" version by Dylan into "a staccato blues-metal monster". Maria McKee and Larkin Poe have both included the song in their concerts.
