= Changing of the Guards =

Single by Bob Dylan

from the album Street-Legal
- B-side: "Señor (Tales of Yankee Power)" (US/UK); "New Pony" (Europe); "We Better Talk This Over" (Australia)
- Released: August 28, 1978 (Europe); September 25, 1978 (Australia); October 24, 1978 (US); December 29, 1978 (UK)
- Recorded: April 1978
- Genre: Rock; gospel
- Length: 3:39 (single); 6:41 (album); 7:04 (1999 remix)
- Label: Columbia
- Songwriter: Bob Dylan
- Producer: Don DeVito

Bob Dylan singles chronology
"Baby, Stop Crying" (1978)	"Changing of the Guards" (1978)	"Forever Young (Live)" (1979)

"Changing of the Guards" is a song written by Bob Dylan, sporadically released in 1978 as a single across the world (with varying B-sides) and as the first track on his album Street-Legal. As a single it failed to reach the Billboard Top 100. However, the song has been included on compilation albums: Bob Dylan's Greatest Hits Volume 3, released in 1994, and the Deluxe Edition of Dylan, released in 2007.

A slightly longer version of "Changing of the Guards", including an extended ending, was included on remixed/remastered editions of Street-Legal released in 1999 and 2003.

== Critical reception and legacy ==
The song has prompted much criticism, both positive and negative. According to Oliver Trager, author of Keys to the Rain: The Definitive Bob Dylan Encyclopedia, "Changing of the Guards" has been criticized as a "song in which Dylan unsuccessfully and cynically parodies his anthemic self".

Cash Box said that the "kick turns, rolling beat and fine background vocals supporting Dylan's vocals make this one of the strongest tracks" on Street Legal. Record World said it has only "a touch of the customary Dylan sound" and that "the beat is decidedly rock" and it has "big background vocals."

Dylan expert Michael Gray commented that "Changing of the Guards" is a thorough description of Dylan's personal journey, from the beginning of his musical career, about sixteen years prior (the opening line is "Sixteen years"), through his marriage to and divorce from Sara Dylan, up to his conversion to Christianity, which was announced soon after the song's release, although Gray also accused some passages of being "opaque".

Critic Paul Williams praised both the music ("The rhythm and melody are original and powerful; and Dylan’s use of the back-up singers to echo his words at strategic moments throughout each verse is a marvelous device, effective and haunting") as well as the lyrics ("the storytelling structure of the song, mixing political and romantic intrigue, rich imagery, and fascinating setting, singer slipping neatly between first and third person narrative, seems more than adequate to deliver on the promise").

Dylan acknowledged the lyrical ambiguity in a 1978 interview, commenting: "It means something different every time I sing it. 'Changing of the Guards' is a thousand years old'".

U.S. Girls' Meghan Remy cited it as her favourite Dylan song precisely because of the "mistakes": "It’s like the backing singers have never heard the song before. They aren’t on time, the second voice is always late but that’s the charm and spirit of the recording. The lyrics are like a fantasy – you’d think they’re impossible to sing but he somehow cuts the syllables up so they fit in. It’s an insane skill to have, and meanwhile the hooks just keep on coming".

A 2021 Guardian article included it on a list of "80 Bob Dylan songs everyone should know".

== In popular culture ==
Hip hop group Public Enemy referenced the song's title in their 2007 Dylan tribute song "Long and Whining Road": "From basement tapes, beyond them dollars and cents / Changing of the guards spent, now where the hell the majors went?"

== Live performance history ==
Dylan performed "Changing of the Guards" 68 times in concert. All performances were in 1978.

== Covers ==
"Changing of the Guards" has been covered by:

- Frank Black: All My Ghosts (1998)
- Juice Leskinen: "Vahdinvaihto" single (1999)
- Chris Whitley & Jeff Lang: Dislocation Blues (2006)
- Patti Smith: Twelve (2007)
- The Gaslight Anthem: Chimes of Freedom: The Songs of Bob Dylan (2011)
- David Huckfelt: "I Was Born, But..." (2026)
