= Stuck Inside of Mobile with the Memphis Blues Again =

1966 song by Bob Dylan

Song by Bob Dylan

from the album Blonde on Blonde
- Released: June 20, 1966
- Recorded: February 17, 1966
- Studio: Columbia Studio A, Nashville
- Length: 7:06
- Label: Columbia
- Songwriter: Bob Dylan
- Producer: Bob Johnston

Audio
- "Stuck Inside of Mobile with the Memphis Blues Again" on YouTube

"Stuck Inside of Mobile with the Memphis Blues Again"

Single by Bob Dylan

from the album Hard Rain
- B-side: "Rita May"
- Released: November 26, 1976 (US); January 28, 1977 (Europe)
- Recorded: May 16, 1976
- Venue: Tarrant County Convention Center Arena, Fort Worth, Texas
- Genre: Folk, rock
- Length: 3:35 (single edit); 6:06 (album version)
- Label: Columbia
- Songwriter: Bob Dylan
- Producers: Don DeVito; Bob Dylan

Bob Dylan singles chronology
"Mozambique" (1976)	"Stuck Inside of Mobile with the Memphis Blues Again" (1976)	"Baby, Stop Crying" (1978)

"Stuck Inside of Mobile with the Memphis Blues Again" (also listed as "Memphis Blues Again") is a song by American singer-songwriter Bob Dylan from his seventh studio album, Blonde on Blonde (1966). The song was written by Dylan and produced by Bob Johnston. It has nine verses, each featuring a distinct set of characters and circumstances. All 20 takes of "Stuck Inside of Mobile with the Memphis Blues Again" were recorded in the early hours of February 17, 1966, at Columbia Records's A Studio in Nashville, Tennessee, with the last take selected for the album. This version also appears on Dylan's second compilation album, Bob Dylan's Greatest Hits Vol. II (1971).

An earlier take of the song was released on The Bootleg Series Vol. 7: No Direction Home: The Soundtrack in 2005, and other takes were issued on The Bootleg Series Vol. 12: The Cutting Edge 1965–1966 in 2015. "Stuck Inside of Mobile with the Memphis Blues Again" has received a positive reception from critics, who have variously praised Dylan's lyrics, his vocal performance, and its musicianship.

Dylan played the song live in concert 748 times from 1976 to 2010. A live version recorded in May 1976 was included on the live album from that tour, Hard Rain (1976), and was also released as a single with "Rita May" as the B-side. The Hard Rain version received a generally negative critical reception.

== Background and recording ==
The album Another Side of Bob Dylan (1964) saw Bob Dylan start to move away from the contemporary folk music sound that had characterized his early albums. Bringing It All Back Home (1965) featured both electric and acoustic tracks, and Highway 61 Revisited later that year was purely electric. In 1965, Dylan hired the Hawks as his backing group, but recording sessions in New York for a new album were not productive with them, and he accepted a suggestion from his producer Bob Johnston that the sessions should transfer to Nashville, Tennessee. Dylan went to Nashville in February 1966, with Al Kooper and Robbie Robertson from the New York sessions also making the trip.

"Stuck Inside of Mobile with the Memphis Blues Again" was written by Dylan, who sang and played harmonica on the song, with Kooper on organ, and members of the A-Team of studio musicians that had been engaged for the album sessions: Charlie McCoy, Wayne Moss and Joe South (guitars), Hargus Robbins (piano), Henry Strzelecki (electric bass) and Kenneth Buttrey (drums). All 20 takes of the song were recorded in the early hours of February 17, 1966, at Columbia Studio A. Dylan reworked the song in the studio, revising lyrics and changing the song's structure as he recorded different takes. According to Clinton Heylin, most of the revisions were to the song's arrangement, rather than to the words. Eventually, after recording for three hours, a master take, the twentieth and final take, lasting seven minutes and six seconds, was chosen. It was released as the second track on side two of Dylan's seventh studio album, the double album Blonde on Blonde, on June 20, 1966. Take five was released on The Bootleg Series Vol. 7: No Direction Home: The Soundtrack (2005).

In 2015, take 13 was released on the two-disc edition of The Bootleg Series Vol. 12: The Cutting Edge 1965–1966. This, and four additional takes were on the six-disc Deluxe edition, and the entire recording session was released on the 18-disc Collector's Edition. The song has sometimes been listed as "Memphis Blues Again" or "Stuck Inside Of Memphis With The" on album releases; the correct title first appeared when it was included on Bob Dylan's Greatest Hits Vol. II (1971).

== Analysis and reception ==
Michael Gray identified several possible influences on "Stuck Inside of Mobile with the Memphis Blues Again", including "The Memphis Blues" by W. C. Handy, who wrote the music, published in 1912, and George A. Norton, who wrote the lyrics the following year. He further notes the influence of Ma Rainey's "Memphis Bound Blues" (1925); "South Memphis Blues" by Frank Stokes (1929); and "North Memphis Blues" by Memphis Minnie (1930). Gray saw similarities with the Bukka White song "Aberdeen Mississippi Blues" (1940), which has the line "Sittin' down in Aberdeen with New Orleans on my mind".

The song has nine verses, each, according to critic Andy Gill, providing "an absurd little vignette illustrating contemporary alienation". Musicologist Wilfrid Mellers described the song as strophic; Literature scholar Timothy Hampton felt that Dylan's "technique of varying the chorus as a way of isolating the singer from the listener" as he employed on some of the Blonde on Blonde tracks is in evidence on "Stuck Inside of Mobile with the Memphis Blues Again", where the chorus is sung differently by Dylan each time.

Journalist Oliver Trager suggested that, like other Dylan songs of the time, the themes were "suspicion of authority figures, solicitous females, and a confused, persecuted, and possibly intoxicated narrator". Mellers wrote that the song, which features a list of characters including Shakespeare, Mona, Ruth, a ragman, a senator, a preacher, a rainman, railroad men, and a deceased grandfather, gave "evidence of the interdependence in Dylan's songs of everyday reality and myth". Each verse includes a distinct set of characters and circumstances. Mike Marqusee felt that "thwarted escapism blends with a sense of impending doom" in the song. He added that:

urban and rural, tradition and innovation are held in a churning stasis. The mysteriously impassable distance between Mobile, the Gulf Coast oil town, and Memphis, the great honey pot on the Mississippi, is the distance between depression and elation, isolation and community, anonymity and recognition, fatalism and freedom. The journey from one to the other is constantly obstructed.

The sociologist John Wells argued that the song "cannot possibly be wholly experienced as a truly remarkable work of art" from reading the lyrics alone, but only when listening to Dylan's performance. He posited that after listening to the track numerous times, listeners would realise, "Mobile no longer just means being stuck in an Alabama city, but ... represents the grotesque, turbulent world we all inhabit." Communication studies scholar Keith Nainby wrote that Dylan "enacted an alienated, tumultuous narrative persona that was troubled, not comforted, by his place and time".

In a positive review of Blonde on Blonde for Asbury Park Press, Dave Margoshes considered the song, which he called a "surrealistic frenetic blues", to be one of the four "outstanding" tracks on the album. Paul Williams named the track as his favorite from the album when he wrote in Crawdaddy! in 1966 that it was "a chain of anecdotes bound together by an evocative chorus". He offered, "Dylan relates specific episodes and emotions in his offhand impressionistic manner, somehow making the universal specific and then making it universal again in that oh-so-accurate refrain." Williams also praised the musicianship, adding that he had never heard the organ "played so effectively" as by Kooper on the number. In the Record Mirror review, Norman Jopling wrote that the song was "jolly .. with a teen-beaty backing" and was "quite amusing".

Neil Spencer gave the song a rating of 5/5 stars in an Uncut magazine Dylan supplement in 2015, rating it as one of the three "grand statements" on Blonde on Blonde, alongside "Sad Eyed Lady of the Lowlands" and "Visions of Johanna". Author John Nogowski rated the song as "A+". He described it as "a brilliantly funny portrait in black velvet of a world gone mad", and one of Dylan's "most perfectly realized songs".

== Live performances ==
According to his website, Dylan played "Stuck Inside of Mobile with the Memphis Blues Again" 748 times in concert between 1976 and 2010. The first live performance was at the University of West Florida, Pensacola, on April 28, 1976, during the Rolling Thunder Revue tour. The performance at Tarrant County Convention Center Arena, Fort Worth, Texas, on May 16, 1976, was included on the live album from the tour, Hard Rain, released on September 10, 1976. The album was produced by Don DeVito and Dylan. The Hard Rain version has a duration of six minutes and six seconds. An edited version of this album track, lasting three minutes and 35 seconds, was also released as a single in the United States on November 30, 1976, with "Rita May" as the B-side; the single did not chart. Critics received the Hard Rain version of the song, which omitted three verses from the original, negatively. Nogowski rated the version as a B+, but preferred the musicianship on the original.

== Personnel ==
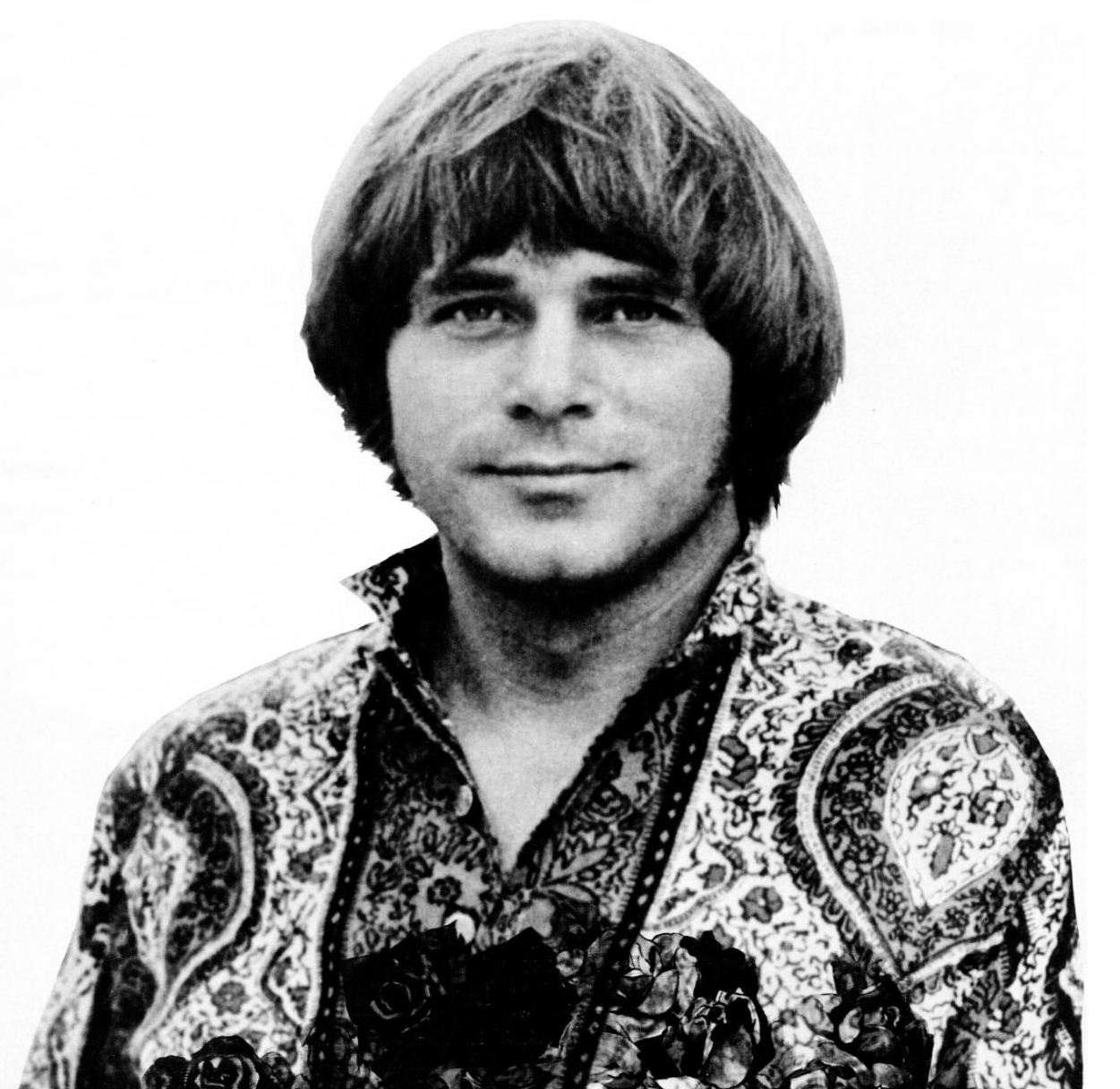
According to Philippe Margotin and Jean-Michel Guesdon, Joe South "distinguished himself by his brilliant guitar playing and licks in the Nashville style" on the recording.

The personnel for the original album session were as follows.

Musicians

- Bob Dylan – vocals, acoustic guitar
- Charlie McCoy – acoustic guitar
- Wayne Moss – electric guitar
- Joe South – electric guitar
- Al Kooper – organ
- Hargus Robbins – piano
- Henry Strzelecki – electric bass
- Kenneth Buttrey – drums

Technical

- Bob Johnston – production

== Bibliography ==
- Dettmar, Kevin; Latham, Sean (2021). "A chronology of Bob Dylan's life". In Latham, Sean (ed.). The World of Bob Dylan. Cambridge: Cambridge University Press. pp. 13–19.
- Edwards, Leigh H. (2021). "Country Music: Dylan, Cash, and the Projection of Authenticity". In Latham, Sean (ed.). The World of Bob Dylan. Cambridge: Cambridge University Press. pp. 100–111.
- Gill, Andy (2011). Bob Dylan: the Stories Behind the Songs 1962–1969. London: Carlton. ISBN 978-1-84732-759-8.
- Gray, Michael (2004). Song and Dance Man III: The Art of Bob Dylan. London: Continuum International Publishing Group. ISBN 978-0-8264-6382-1.
- Hampton, Timothy (2020). Bob Dylan: How the Songs Work (Kindle ed.). Princeton: Princeton University Press. ISBN 978-1-942130-36-9.
- Heylin, Clinton (2010). Revolution in the Air - the Songs of Bob Dylan Vol.1 1957-73. Constable. ISBN 978-1-84901-296-6.
- Heylin, Clinton (2016). Judas!: From Forest Hills to the Free Trade Hall: A Historical View of Dylan's Big Boo (Kindle ed.). Route Publishing. ISBN 978-1-901927-68-9.
- Margotin, Philippe; Guesdon, Jean-Michel (2022). Bob Dylan All the Songs: The Story Behind Every Track (Expanded ed.). New York: Black Dog & Leventhal. ISBN 978-0-7624-7573-5.
- Marqusee, Mike (2005). Wicked Messenger: Bob Dylan and the 1960s. New York: Seven Stories Press. ISBN 978-1-58322-686-5.
- Mellers, Wilfrid (1985). A Darker Shade of Pale: A Backdrop to Bob Dylan. Oxford University Press. ISBN 978-0-571-13345-1.
- Nainby, Keith (2011). "Free, Stuck, Tangled: Bob Dylan, the 'Self' and the Performer's Critical Perspective". Contemporary Theatre Review. 21 (3). Taylor & Francis: 286–301. doi:10.1080/10486801.2011.585979. S2CID 194100687.
- Nogowski, John (2022). Bob Dylan: A Descriptive, Critical Discography and Filmography, 1961-2022 (3rd ed.). Jefferson: McFarland & Company. ISBN 978-1-4766-4362-5.
- Sanders, Daryl (2020). That Thin, Wild Mercury Sound: Dylan, Nashville, and the Making of Blonde on Blonde (epub ed.). Chicago: Chicago Review Press. ISBN 978-1-61373-550-3.
- Trager, Oliver (2004). Keys to the Rain: the Definitive Bob Dylan Encyclopedia. New York: Billboard Books. ISBN 978-0-8230-7974-2.
- Wells, John (1978). "Bent Out of Shape from Society's Pliers: A Sociological Study of the Grotesque in the Songs of Bob Dylan". Popular Music and Society. VI (1): 39–43. doi:10.1080/03007767808591108.
- Williams, Paul (1969) [1st pub. Crawdaddy!: July 1966]. "Understanding Dylan". Outlaw Blues; a Book of Rock Music. New York: E. P. Dutton. pp. 59–69.
- Williams, Paul (2004) [1990]. Bob Dylan, Performing Artist: The Early Years, 1960–1973. Omnibus Press. ISBN 978-1-84449-095-0.
