= No Time to Think (song) =

Song by Bob Dylan

from the album Street-Legal
- Recorded: April 27, 1978
- Studio: Rundown (Santa Monica)
- Length: 8:19
- Label: Columbia
- Songwriter: Bob Dylan
- Producer: Don DeVito

"No Time to Think" is a song by American singer-songwriter Bob Dylan, released on his eighteenth studio album Street-Legal (1978). Like the rest of the album, the song was recorded at Rundown Studios in Santa Monica, California and produced by Don DeVito. The longest track on the album, it has divided critics, with some declaring it a "major epic" in Dylan's catalogue and others finding it falls short of its ambitions.

== Background and recording ==
Dylan is known to have played a work-in-progress version of "No Time to Think" at Rundown Studios on December 26, 1977. According to biographer Clinton Heylin, the lyrics still needed to be restructured at this point (with some verses having four lines and others consisting of five), while its music was "quite different" from its final arrangement.

The take which appears on the album was recorded at Rundown Studios on April 27, 1978.

== Composition and meaning ==
Heylin describes "No Time to Think" as a "hugely ambitious undertaking", and considers its "closest kin" in Dylan's catalog to be the film Renaldo and Clara (1977). The lyrics include themes of "corruption", "pride", "vanity", and "obsession", while Dylan himself stated of the song: "We're all dreaming, and… songs [like 'No Time to Think'] come close to getting inside that dream." Heylin also notes the use of unconventional rhymes and line breaks throughout the lyrics. Brian Hinton considers the track to be a "catalogue song" and likens it to "All I Really Want to Do" (1964). Jonathan Cott of Rolling Stone interprets the song as being about "the stripping bare of personality".

Michael Gray opines that the song's "hypnotic yet ridiculous waltz-rhythm" underpins its lyrical theme of "the noisy, mechanical going-nowhere of 'real life'". Gray also highlights references to Tarot and themes of betrayal within the lyrics, while also believing that the song foreshadows Dylan's conversion to Christianity which would occur later in the year. Howard Sounes notes that any autobiographical elements of the song are "disguised with dense imagery" including references to astrology, while Cott also notes themes of the Tarot and magic. In his interview with Dylan, Cott opines that "No Time to Think" "suggest[s] the idea of spirits manifesting their destiny as the dramatis personae of our dreams".
