= The Rolling Thunder Revue: The 1976 Live Recordings =

Box set by Bob Dylan
- Released: November 6, 2026
- Recorded: April 18–May 25, 1976
- Labels: Columbia; Legacy

Bob Dylan chronology
The Bootleg Series Vol. 18: Through the Open Window 1956–1963 (2025)	The Rolling Thunder Revue: The 1976 Live Recordings (2026)

The Rolling Thunder Revue: The 1976 Live Recordings is a box set by American singer-songwriter Bob Dylan. It was released on November 6, 2026, through Columbia Records and Legacy Recordings. Encompassing 39 discs and 381 tracks (371 of which are previously unreleased), the set includes most of the 1976 leg of the Rolling Thunder Revue tour, which spanned April and May of that year. A performance in Fort Worth, Texas on May 16, 1976 was also released individually as a triple LP.

== Track listing ==
All tracks are written by Bob Dylan, except where noted.

Disc one (April 18, 1976 – Civic Center, Lakeland, FL)
No.	Title	Writer(s)	Length
1.	"Visions of Johanna"
2.	"If You See Her, Say Hello"
3.	"Vincent van Gogh"	Robert Freimark
4.	"Weary Blues from Waitin'"	Hank Williams
5.	"I'll Be Your Baby Tonight"
6.	"Maggie's Farm"
7.	"One Too Many Mornings" (incomplete)

Disc two (April 20th, 1976 – Bayfront Civic Center Auditorium, St. Petersburg, FL)
No.	Title	Length
1.	"Mr. Tambourine Man"
2.	"It's Alright, Ma (I'm Only Bleeding)"
3.	"Vincent van Gogh"
4.	"I'll Be Your Baby Tonight"
5.	"Maggie's Farm"
6.	"One Too Many Mornings"
7.	"Seven Days"

Disc three (April 20th, 1976 – Bayfront Civic Center Auditorium, St. Petersburg, FL)
No.	Title	Writer(s)	Length
1.	"Railroad Boy"	traditional
2.	"Wild Mountain Thyme"	traditional
3.	"Blowin' in the Wind"
4.	"Shelter from the Storm"
5.	"I Threw It All Away"
6.	"Tonight I'll Be Staying Here with You"
7.	"Just Like a Woman"
8.	"It Takes a Lot to Laugh, It Takes a Train to Cry"
9.	"Mozambique"	Dylan; Jacques Levy
10.	"Lay, Lady, Lay"
11.	"Idiot Wind" (incomplete)
12.	"Gotta Travel On"	traditional

== Charts ==
Chart performance for The Rolling Thunder Revue: The 1976 Live Recordings
Chart (2026)	Peak position
Austrian Albums (Ö3 Austria)	17
Belgian Albums (Ultratop Flanders)	15
Belgian Albums (Ultratop Wallonia)	70
German Albums (Offizielle Top 100)	29
German Rock & Metal Albums (Offizielle Top 100)	12
Irish Albums (IRMA)	71
Norwegian Albums (IFPI Norge)	48
Scottish Albums (Official Charts)	16
Swiss Albums (Schweizer Hitparade)	14
UK Albums (Official Charts)	84
US Top Album Sales (Billboard)	20
