= Bob Dylan and the Band 1974 Tour =

1974 concert tour by Bob Dylan

- Tour by Bob Dylan and the Band
- Promotional poster for the tour
- Start date: January 3, 1974
- End date: February 14, 1974
- Legs: 1
- No. of shows: 40
- Box office: $5 million ($32.6 in 2025 dollars)

Bob Dylan and the Band concert chronology
- World Tour (1966); Bob Dylan and the Band 1974 Tour (1974); Rolling Thunder Revue (Dylan and others, 1975–76)

The Bob Dylan and the Band 1974 Tour – sometimes referred to as Tour '74 – was a two-month concert tour staged in arenas during early 1974 that featured Bob Dylan, in his first tour in eight years, performing with his old partners the Band. The tour generated intense fan and media interest and tickets for the shows, available only through mail order, were in great demand. Shows on the concert featured segments with Dylan and the Band together, the Band by themselves, and Dylan by himself. Accounts of the shows emphasized the sometimes drastic rearrangements that Dylan's well-known songs were presented with. A live double album, Before the Flood, was recorded during the tour and released later in the year. In 2024, The 1974 Live Recordings was released, a 27-CD set comprising all known recordings of the tour.

== Announcement and itinerary ==
The 40-concert, 30-date, 21-city tour began on January 3, 1974, and ended on February 14, 1974. The tour was one of the largest such undertakings of its era, and took place entirely in indoor sports arenas.

The show reunited Dylan with the Band on stage after the recording of Dylan's Band-backed Planet Waves album, and was the brainchild of David Geffen, who had lured Dylan to his Asylum Records label. Dylan, who by this point in his career had developed a strong interest in his financial position, had been dissatisfied with the terms of his Columbia Records deal. Discussions about a tour took place among Dylan, the Band's guitarist and chief songwriter Robbie Robertson, and Geffen during the summer of 1973. The intent was that Dylan would receive the bulk of the profits from the tour. Promoter Bill Graham then booked a series of dates without telling the venues who the artist would be.

As the Hawks, the then-little-known group had backed Dylan on his last prior full-scale tour, the exhaustive Bob Dylan World Tour 1966, between the releases of Highway 61 Revisited and Blonde on Blonde. Dylan's few public performances in the intervening years had been one-offs like his unannounced guest turn with George Harrison at The Concert for Bangladesh. During this time there had been built up around Dylan, as The New York Times stated, "the legend of a mysterious recluse".

This was a high-profile comeback for both acts; in addition to Dylan's hiatus, the Band had only recently emerged from an eighteen-month interregnum itself, rooted in Robertson's writer's block and keyboardist/second drummer/vocalist Richard Manuel's longstanding alcohol dependence.

News of a tour first came out with a report in The Washington Post in early November 1973 based on a conversation a reporter Tom Zito had with Robertson; it was big news because, as he wrote for the paper, "Bob Dylan, the reclusive songwriter who sparked a generation in the early 1960s ... and, by 1965, had become the single most generative force in rock music, is planning to go on the road for the first time in eight years. Dylan will be accompanied in concert by the Band, the American quintet widely regarded as one of the most important and innovative performing rock ensembles." Or as The New York Times wrote, "Mr. Dylan is widely regarded as the most influential and significant star in the last 10 years of American popular music, and this is his first tour in eight years."

Rehearsals for the tour took place at the Village Recorder in Los Angeles, with final soundchecks taking place at The Forum.

Throughout the tour, Dylan and the Band chartered The Starship, a private jet famously used by Elton John, Led Zeppelin and the Rolling Stones. Long limousines and large hotel suites were also features of the tour. The traveling road crew for the tour numbered around fifteen people, with local labor augmenting them in each venue.

== Ticket sales ==
As Dylan's first full-fledged tour since 1966, the announcement received an enormous amount of coverage from the music and general press. The average ticket price was $8 ($48 adjusted for inflation). Top-dollar tickets were $9.50 (roughly $58 in 2022), considered quite a lot for a rock concert in 1974.

Tickets were sold by mail order, as announced in newspaper advertisements in the various cities, with payment required by certified check or money order for up to four tickets per request. The tickets went "on sale" on December 2, 1973, meaning that was the first day that requests could be postmarked.

There was considerable confusion in some post offices and banks as fans unsure of the process tried to figure it out. The line outside the post office facility Rincon Annex in San Francisco stretched for five blocks when midnight struck. By three days later, there were so many mail requests for shows in New York, Philadelphia, Chicago and Los Angeles that Graham requested the postal service return them to the senders forthwith.

There was, in the words of one Dylan biographer, "an extravagant level of hype for this tour", with for instance Geffen claiming that it was "the biggest thing of its kind in the history of show business". As part of the attention, Dylan appeared on the cover of Newsweek magazine.

As Geffen said on the eve of the tour's first show, "We're trying to make this whole thing as uncrazy as possible. But the most significant thing of all about this tour has been the overwhelming response to it." Geffen claimed that up to twenty tickets could have been sold for each available seat. Graham estimated that some $92 million worth of ticket orders had been placed ($556 million in 2022). Graham said of the ticket sales process, "It was, uh, rather monumental." Although some hyperbole was involved in some of Geffen's and Graham's statements, there was in fact an intense level of fan and media interest in the tour.

There were problems in a few cities with tickets being held back by local promoters and then sold for much higher prices. There were also reports of counterfeit tickets in circulation as well. In some cases alternative newspapers ran classified listings of people offering sexual favors in exchange for tickets.

== The show ==
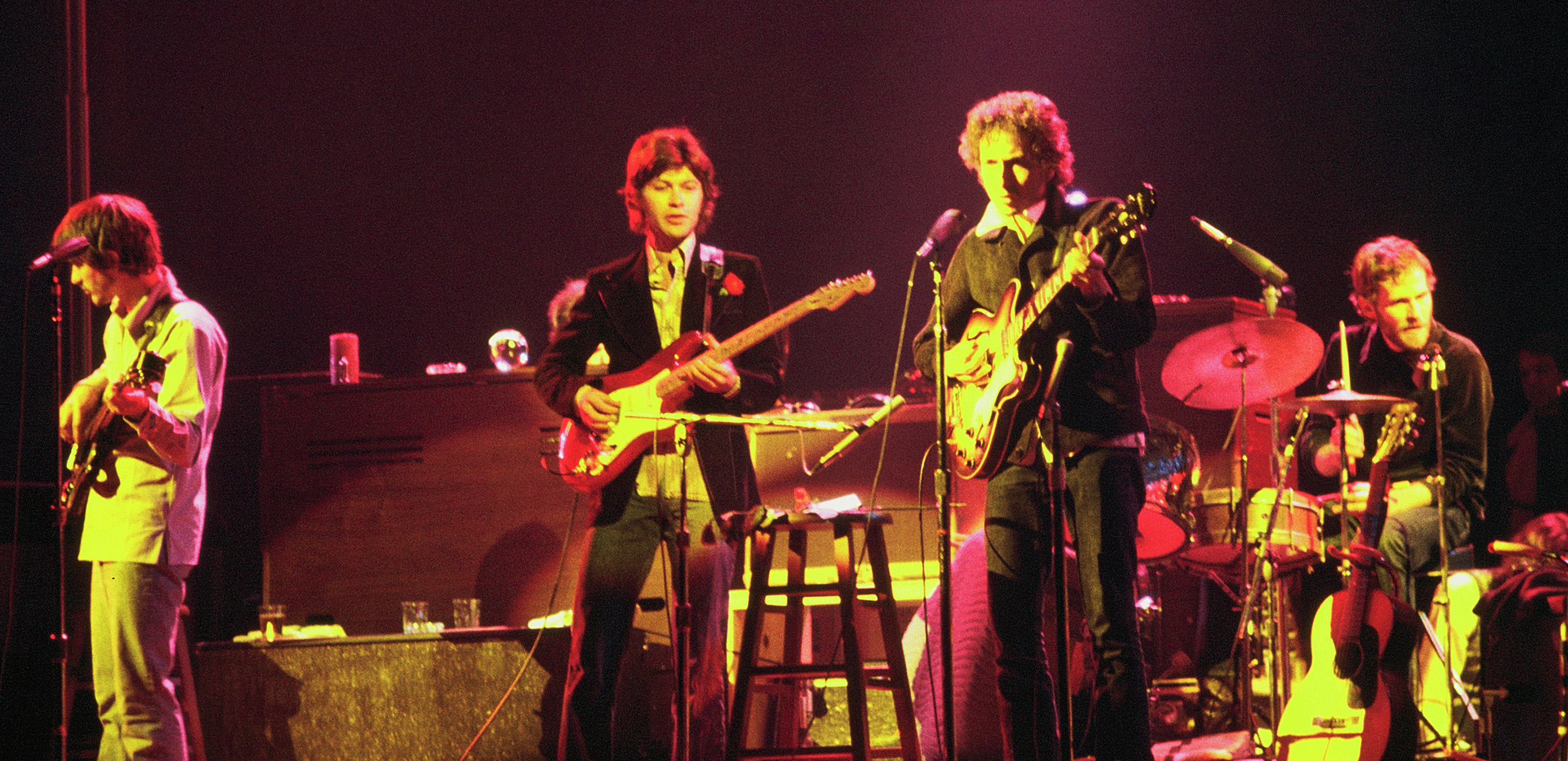
Bob Dylan (center right) with the Band (Danko, Robertson, Helm) at one of the opening Chicago shows

The opening show took place on January 3, 1974 at Chicago Stadium. It had a capacity audience of 18,500. The first song performed was a reworking of "Hero Blues", a previously unreleased song that Dylan had recorded back in the early 1960s. Over the course of two hours, Dylan and the Band performed alternating sets broken down into three categories: Dylan performing his own songs backed by the Band, Dylan's solo acoustic set, and the Band's performances of their own songs. Although Dylan played harmonica during a rendition of Bobby Bland's "Share Your Love with Me" sung by Manuel, the Band elected not to include Dylan in their subsequent group performances in a meeting after the show.

Beginning with the next concert, the tour took on a standard formula: an opening six-song Dylan/Band set, a five-song Band set, three more Dylan/Band performances, a five-song Dylan acoustic set, a three- to four-song Band set, and a joint finale.

Promotional activities in each city were greatly restricted, with no television cameras allowed in the hall, no backstage passes for press or celebrities, and no local radio station appearances. Audience age range for the shows ranged from teenagers to the grey-haired, but most were in their twenties or thirties. Dylan's stage patter during the shows was generally minimal, sticking to brief mentions of the city they were playing in or other mentions of the intermission.

While virtually all the songs in the shows were familiar and many were familiar from progressive rock radio airplay, few of them sounded similar to their original versions. Driven by Levon Helm's syncopated, contrapuntal drumming, Dylan's songs (exemplified by a Jimi Hendrix-influenced take on "All Along the Watchtower") were re-arranged and sung with a ferocity not found on the originals, while Garth Hudson's experiments with the Lowery String Symphonizer (an early synthesizer embedded in the Lowery H25-3 organ that was adapted from the Freeman string symphonizer) further enriched the Band's timbral palette.

The tour represented the beginning of Dylan's effort to come to terms with the material that had made him famous by heavily rearranging that material, a project that would continue with the 1975–76 Rolling Thunder Revue and the 1978 shows that went into his Bob Dylan at Budokan album. As Ben Fong-Torres wrote at the time, Dylan was "putting new italics into old songs — 'Ya say yer lookin' for someone' ... 'It still ain't me, babe'".

The Band's playing was more aggressive than it had been when they had recorded with Dylan and more akin to that of their famed 1966 live shows with Dylan, something that Robertson would later acknowledge was a tendency of theirs. Helm later noted that this was the very thing they had been booed for during those shows back then. In any case, the Band had a reputation for being at its best in concert, and received plaudits for their playing on these shows.

"Most Likely You Go Your Way and I'll Go Mine", a lesser-known track from Blonde on Blonde, was a showpiece number for the new arrangements and was highlighted as show opener or closer (as well as being the single released from the subsequent live album). Even though the set list was mostly static, the Band kept their interest going by making changes to how they played each song as they went along.

At the beginning of the tour, a few songs from Planet Waves were performed in concert; however, as the tour wore on, these songs gradually disappeared from the setlist. By the end, only "Forever Young" would remain. Songs like "Hero Blues" and "Nobody 'Cept You" were also performed at some of the earlier shows, but such idiosyncratic choices would eventually disappear as well. Dylan's older, celebrated compositions were already heavily favored, but as the tour wore on, they would completely dominate the shows.

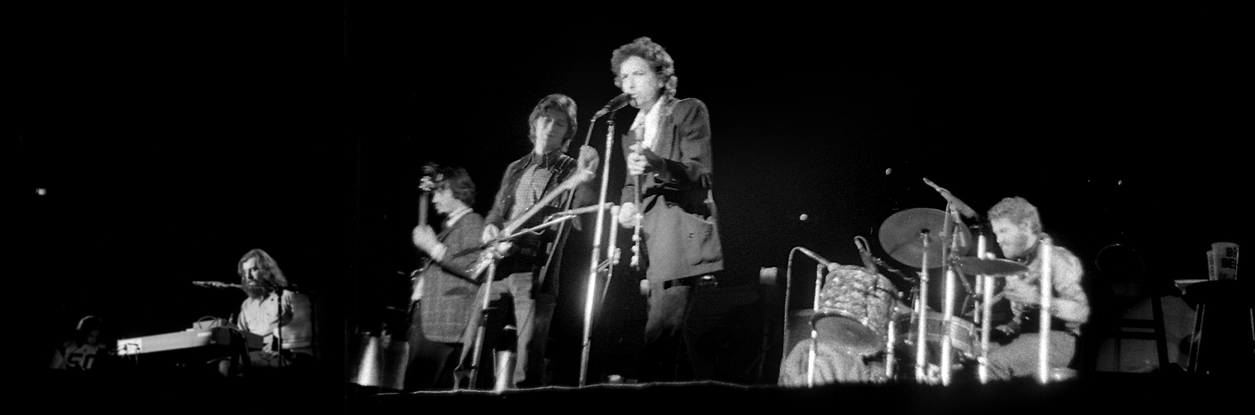
Bob Dylan, center, with the Band (Garth Hudson not visible) at the Ann Arbor show

Dylan and the Band were very aware of the nostalgic atmosphere surrounding the tour, even as they recast Dylan's back catalog in dramatic, new arrangements. Helm later recalled, "I sometimes had a funny sensation: that we were acting out the roles of Bob Dylan and the Band, and the audience was paying to see what they'd missed many years before."

However, there were moments where contemporary events did connect with the proceedings: when the tour was going on, the Watergate scandal was dominating the headlines. One of the most popular songs during the shows was "It's Alright, Ma (I'm Only Bleeding)"; performed during Dylan's solo acoustic sets, it never failed to elicit cheers when Dylan got to the words, "Even the President of the United States sometimes must have to stand naked." (This reaction can be heard very explicitly on the recording of the song that appears on Before the Flood.) In some cases fans held lighters aloft during the concert, an early instance of this practice among rock audiences, and a photograph of one of these instances became the cover for the Before the Flood live album.

In Atlanta, Dylan and the Band visited notable fan and governor of the state Jimmy Carter at the Georgia Governor's Mansion, with an enjoyable stay capped by Rosalynn Carter preparing breakfast for them. The visit was reported on February 28, 1974's Rolling Stone.

Toward the end of the tour, Dylan and the Band made a stop at Oakland Arena. Dylan would write in his tour diary that, though he felt the Oakland shows went fairly well, he had done them on little sleep. Meanwhile, Dylan's performances became less and less restrained, and Dylan would later acknowledge this in an interview taken in 1980: "When Elvis did 'That's All Right, Mama' in 1955, it was sensitivity and power. In 1969, it was just full-out power. There was nothing other than just force behind that. I've fallen into that trap, too. Take the 1974 tour. It's a very fine line you have to walk to stay in touch with something once you've created it ... Either it holds up for you or it doesn't."

Dylan's wife, Sara, was present at those final shows. During the final show of the tour, which took place on Valentine's Day, Dylan broke from the standard setlist to play Sara's favorite song, "Mr. Tambourine Man". Accompanied by Garth Hudson on accordion, it was only the song's second appearance on the entire tour, and would not be included on Before the Flood.

The final shows at the Los Angeles Forum drew a number of fellow musicians and celebrities, including Carole King, Ringo Starr, Joan Baez, Jack Nicholson, and Warren Beatty. Others who tried to attend but could not get in included Roger McGuinn and Jerry Garcia. By then, Danko, Manuel, and Helm were all having problems with their singing voices. The final song played on the tour was an added-to-the-setlist "Blowin' in the Wind".

== Critical and commercial reception ==
The tour generally got a positive reception from music critics. Robert Christgau referred to the tour arrangements as both crazy and strong and wrote that "But while the Band sounds undisciplined, threatening to destroy their headlong momentum by throwing out one foot or elbow too many, they never abandon their enormous technical ability. ... [Dylan's] voice settles in at a rich bellow, running over more than one of his old songs like a truck. Such a sacrilege. Uncle Bob purveying to the sports arena masses. We may never even be sure that this is a masterpiece."

A minority voice was that of Nat Hentoff, who would write, "Dylan's sound and beat are of the past... the gestalt is anachronistic."

The Rolling Stone Record Guide subsequently wrote that in the shows of Tour '74, "Dylan reinterprets all of his old material drastically, singing the lyrics as though they mean nothing at all or something very different from what we've always understood them to signify." The guide said that this change was "discomforting" but "interesting" and sometimes even "fascinating". In his 1979 volume Stranded: Rock and Roll for a Desert Island, famed rock critic Greil Marcus included a rendition of "Most Likely You Go Your Way and I'll Go Mine" from the tour in his "Treasure Island" list of essential recordings in the history of rock music.

In terms of box office performance, by one estimate, more than seven percent of the U.S. population had submitted orders for tickets (over 20 million tickets application), and while some shows sold faster than others, eventually all were sold out with a total of 658,000 tickets being mailed. The total gross receipts for the tour were around $5 million.

Both Dylan and the Band made a lot of money from the tour, although some of it was spent on a luxurious traveling life. And some of Dylan and the Band's tour revenue was lost when the artists – against the advice of Levon Helm – invested it in tax shelter schemes that went bad a few years later.

The tour helped to promote Planet Waves, which became the first Dylan album to reach number one on the Billboard 200 album chart. Nevertheless, Dylan thought the record should have sold even more given the amount of publicity the tour received, and the experience overall with Geffen was not to Dylan's liking. Thus Dylan soon re-signed with Columbia Records on more favorable terms.

== Live recording and aftermath ==
While the shows were received with great enthusiasm on the part of the audiences, Dylan himself later disparaged the tour, feeling that it was overblown. "I think I was just playing a role on that tour, I was playing Bob Dylan and the Band were playing the Band. It was all sort of mindless. The only thing people talked about was energy this, energy that. The highest compliments were things like, 'Wow, lotta energy, man.' It had become absurd." By one account, Dylan liked the money but not the experience.

Helm echoed those sentiments, writing in his autobiography: "The tour was damn good for our pocketbooks, but it just wasn't a very passionate trip for any of us."

The live album Before the Flood was released in June 1974, and contained a representative sample of the tour, drawn from shows in New York City and Los Angeles.

Tour ticket sales proved to Dylan that his commercial prospects were still strong on the road. Furthermore, his critical status beginning to grow again after years of minimal activity interspersed with indifferent releases; it would bound far higher with the following year's release of one of his most acclaimed albums, Blood on the Tracks.

== Tour musicians ==
- Bob Dylan – acoustic guitar, rhythm guitar, harmonica, piano, vocals
- Rick Danko – bass, vocals
- Levon Helm – drums, vocals
- Garth Hudson – organ, acoustic piano, synthesizer, clavinet
- Richard Manuel – acoustic and electric pianos, organ, drums, vocals
- Robbie Robertson – lead guitar, backing vocals

== Tour dates ==
Date	City	Country	Venue
January 3, 1974	Chicago	United States	Chicago Stadium
January 4, 1974	Chicago	United States	Chicago Stadium
January 4, 1974 - The September 2024 box Bob Dylan & The Band "1974 Live Recordings" indicates that there was no 1/4/74 2nd show.	Chicago	United States	Chicago Stadium
January 6, 1974	Philadelphia	United States	The Spectrum
January 6, 1974	Philadelphia	United States	The Spectrum
January 7, 1974	Philadelphia	United States	The Spectrum
January 9, 1974	Toronto	Canada	Maple Leaf Gardens
January 10, 1974	Toronto	Canada	Maple Leaf Gardens
January 11, 1974	Montreal	Canada	Montreal Forum
January 12, 1974	Montreal	Canada	Montreal Forum
January 12, 1974 - The September 2024 box Bob Dylan & The Band "1974 Live Recordings" indicates that there was no 1/12/74 2nd show.	Montreal	Canada	Montreal Forum
January 14, 1974	Boston	United States	Boston Garden
January 14, 1974	Boston	United States	Boston Garden
January 15, 1974	Landover	United States	Capital Centre
January 16, 1974	Landover	United States	Capital Centre
January 17, 1974	Charlotte	United States	Charlotte Coliseum
January 17, 1974 - The September 2024 box Bob Dylan & The Band "1974 Live Recordings" indicates that there was no 1/17/74 2nd show.	Charlotte	United States	Charlotte Coliseum
January 19, 1974 - The September 2024 box Bob Dylan & The Band "1974 Live Recordings" indicates that there were two 1/19/74 shows.	Pembroke Pines	United States	Hollywood Sportatorium
January 21, 1974	Atlanta	United States	The Omni
January 22, 1974	Atlanta	United States	The Omni
January 23, 1974	Memphis	United States	Mid-South Coliseum
January 23, 1974 - The September 2024 box Bob Dylan & The Band "1974 Live Recordings" indicates that there was no 1/23/74 2nd show.	Memphis	United States	Mid-South Coliseum
January 25, 1974	Fort Worth	United States	Tarrant County Convention Center
January 26, 1974	Houston	United States	Hofheinz Pavilion
January 26, 1974	Houston	United States	Hofheinz Pavilion
January 28, 1974	Uniondale	United States	Nassau Coliseum
January 29, 1974	Uniondale	United States	Nassau Coliseum
January 30, 1974	New York City	United States	Madison Square Garden
January 31, 1974	New York City	United States	Madison Square Garden
January 31, 1974	New York City	United States	Madison Square Garden
February 2, 1974	Ann Arbor	United States	Crisler Arena
February 3, 1974	Bloomington	United States	Assembly Hall
February 4, 1974	St. Louis	United States	St. Louis Arena
February 4, 1974	St. Louis	United States	St. Louis Arena
February 6, 1974	Denver	United States	Denver Coliseum
February 6, 1974	Denver	United States	Denver Coliseum
February 9, 1974 - The September 2024 box Bob Dylan & The Band "1974 Live Recordings" indicates that there were two 2/9/74 shows.	Seattle	United States	Seattle Center Coliseum
February 11, 1974	Oakland	United States	Oakland–Alameda County Coliseum Arena
February 11, 1974	Oakland	United States	Oakland–Alameda County Coliseum Arena
February 13, 1974	Inglewood	United States	The Forum
February 14, 1974	Inglewood	United States	The Forum
February 14, 1974	Inglewood	United States	The Forum

== Bibliography ==
- Marcus, Greil, ed. (1979). Stranded: Rock and Roll for a Desert Island. New York: Alfred A. Knopf. ISBN 0-394-50828-9.
- Marsh, Dave; Swenson, John, eds. (1979). The Rolling Stone Record Guide (1st ed.). New York: Random House/Rolling Stone Press. ISBN 0-394-41096-3.
- Maslin, Janet (1980). "Bob Dylan". In Miller, Jim (ed.). The Rolling Stone Illustrated History of Rock & Roll (Revised and updated ed.). New York: Random House/Rolling Stone Press. pp. 219–227. ISBN 0-394-51322-3.
- Sounes, Howard (2002) [2001]. Down the Highway: The Life of Bob Dylan. London: Black Swan. ISBN 0-552-99929-6.
- Helm, Levon; Davis, Stephen (2013) [1993]. This Wheel's on Fire: Levon Helm and the Story of the Band (Updated ed.). Chicago: Chicago Review Press. ISBN 978-1-55652-405-9.
