= Hard Rain (Bob Dylan album) =

Live album by Bob Dylan
- Released: September 13, 1976
- Recorded: May 16 and 23, 1976
- Genre: Rock
- Length: 51:06
- Label: Columbia
- Producers: Don DeVito; Bob Dylan

Bob Dylan chronology
Desire (1976)	Hard Rain (1976)	Masterpieces (1978)

Singles from Hard Rain
- 1. "Stuck Inside of Mobile with the Memphis Blues Again" Released: November 26, 1976

Professional ratings
Review scores
Source	Rating
AllMusic	2/5 stars
Christgau's Record Guide	B−
The Encyclopedia of Popular Music	2/5 stars
Rolling Stone	3/5 stars

Hard Rain is a live album by American singer-songwriter Bob Dylan, released on September 13, 1976, by Columbia Records. The album was recorded during two concerts in May 1976 during the second leg of the Rolling Thunder Revue. The second of these concerts was recorded by NBC and released as a television special to coincide with the album's release. Hard Rain received mixed reviews.

== Recordings and TV special ==
The album was partly recorded on May 23, 1976, during a concert at Hughes Stadium in Fort Collins, Colorado; the penultimate show of the tour, the concert was also filmed and broadcast by NBC as a one-hour television special in September. (Hard Rain's release coincided with this broadcast). Despite heavy promotion that placed it on the cover of TV Guide, NBC's television broadcast of the May 23rd concert drew disappointing ratings.

Four tracks from the album ("I Threw It All Away", "Stuck inside of Mobile with the Memphis Blues Again", "Oh, Sister", and "Lay, Lady, Lay") were recorded on May 16, 1976, in Fort Worth, Texas.

Hard Rain was the only official release of the 1976 Rolling Thunder tour until The Rolling Thunder Revue: The 1976 Live Recordings in 2026. A representation of the earlier 1975 portion of the Rolling Thunder Revue was released in 2002 on The Bootleg Series Vol. 5: Bob Dylan Live 1975, The Rolling Thunder Revue. A more comprehensive 14-disc collection titled Bob Dylan – The Rolling Thunder Revue: The 1975 Live Recordings was released in 2019 to coincide with the Netflix documentary-film Rolling Thunder Revue: A Bob Dylan Story by Martin Scorsese.

== Reception ==
Hard Rain received mixed reviews. The album peaked at No. 17 in the U.S. and No. 3 in the UK. Hard Rain eventually earned gold certification.

"Although the band has been playing together longer, the charm has gone out of their exchanges," writes music critic Tim Riley. "Hard Rain...seemed to come at a time when the Rolling Thunder Revue, so joyful and electrifying in its first performances, had just plain run out of steam," wrote Janet Maslin, then a music critic for Rolling Stone. In his mixed review for Hard Rain, Robert Christgau criticized the Rolling Thunder Revue as "folkies whose idea of rock and roll is rock and roll clichés."

Three of the recordings on Hard Rain ("Lay, Lady, Lay", "Idiot Wind", and "Maggie's Farm") were included on the Masterpieces compilation (1978), and "Shelter from the Storm" was included on the Live 1961–2000 compilation (2000).

== Track listing ==
All tracks are written by Bob Dylan, except where noted.

Side one
No.	Title	Writer(s)	Recorded	Length
1.	"Maggie's Farm"		May 23, 1976	5:23
2.	"One Too Many Mornings"		May 23, 1976	3:47
3.	"Stuck Inside of Mobile with the Memphis Blues Again"		May 16, 1976	6:01
4.	"Oh, Sister"	Dylan, Jacques Levy	May 16, 1976	5:08
5.	"Lay Lady Lay"		May 16, 1976	4:47
Total length:				25:06

Side two
No.	Title	Recorded	Length
1.	"Shelter from the Storm"	May 23, 1976	5:29
2.	"You're a Big Girl Now"	May 23, 1976	7:01
3.	"I Threw It All Away"	May 16, 1976	3:18
4.	"Idiot Wind"	May 23, 1976	10:21
Total length:			26:09

== Personnel ==
- Bob Dylan – vocals, guitar, production

=== Additional musicians ===
- T-Bone Burnett – guitar, piano
- David Mansfield – guitar, pedal steel guitar on "Idiot Wind"
- Bob Neuwirth – guitar, background vocals
- Scarlet Rivera – strings
- Mick Ronson – guitar on "Maggie's Farm"
- Steven Soles – guitar, background vocals
- Rob Stoner – bass guitar, background vocals
- Joan Baez – guitar, vocals
- Howard Wyeth – drums, piano
- Gary Burke – drums

=== Technical ===
- Don DeVito – production
- Don Meehan – recording and mixing engineering
- Ken Regan – cover photo
- Paula Scher – cover design
- Lou Waxman – chief of tape research

== Charts ==
Chart performance for Hard Rain
Chart (1976)	Peak position
Dutch Albums (Album Top 100)	10
German Albums (Offizielle Top 100)	38
New Zealand Albums (RMNZ)	24
Norwegian Albums (VG-lista)	15
Swedish Albums (Sverigetopplistan)	41
UK Albums (Official Charts)	3
US Billboard 200	17

== Certifications ==
Certifications for Hard Rain
Region	Certification	Certified units/sales
Canada (Music Canada)	Gold	50,000^{^}
United Kingdom (BPI)	Gold	100,000^{^}
United States (RIAA)	Gold	500,000^{^}
^{^} Shipments figures based on certification alone.
