= Bertha Lou =

"Bertha Lou" is a rockabilly song, first recorded in 1957 by Johnny Faire. It was written by Johnny Burnette and John Marascalco. It was also recorded by Dorsey Burnette and Clint Miller; Miller's version reached #79 on the Billboard Hot 100 in 1958. Reworkings of the song such as "Twinkie Lee", "Snacky Poo", and Bob Dylan's "Rita May" followed.
