= Señor (Tales of Yankee Power) =

1978 song by Bob Dylan

Song by Bob Dylan

from the album Street-Legal
- Released: June 15, 1978
- Recorded: April 28, 1978
- Studio: Rundown Studios (Santa Monica, California)
- Genre: Rock
- Length: 5:42
- Label: Columbia
- Songwriter: Bob Dylan
- Producer: Don DeVito

"Señor (Tales of Yankee Power)" is a minor-key ballad written and performed by American singer-songwriter Bob Dylan and released as the sixth track (or the second song on Side 2 of the vinyl) of his 18th studio album Street-Legal (1978). The song was produced by Don DeVito and later anthologized on the Biograph box set in 1985. Street-Legal was remixed and remastered for a 1999 compact disc release, with a further 5.1 remix done for a Super Audio CD release in 2003. Both re-releases featured the song.

It is the song from Street-Legal that Dylan has played the most in live performance, and the one that has been covered the most by other artists.

== Background and recording ==
Dylan has told several somewhat contradictory stories about the origins of "Señor". When introducing the song in live performance in 1978, he told the story of how "he was on a train going from Mexico to San Diego and how a strange old man got on the train, and Dylan felt the urge to talk to him. Apparently, the story told in the concerts started off fairly simply and gradually expanded adding the notion that when Dylan finally did want to talk to the man, he had gone". Rolling Stone quoted Dylan as describing the man on the train as "150 years old… Both his eyes were burning, and there was smoke coming out of his nostrils".

Another time, Dylan introduced the song by saying it had been inspired by actor Harry Dean Stanton with whom he had starred in Sam Peckinpah's 1973 film Pat Garrett and Billy the Kid. Finally, in an interview accompanying the Biograph booklet, Dylan said it was "about the aftermath of when two people who were leaning on each other because neither one of them had the guts to stand up alone, all of a sudden they break apart". He added, "I think I felt that way when I wrote it".

In their book Bob Dylan All the Songs: The Story Behind Every Track, authors Philippe Margotin and Jean-Michel Guesdon compare it to Dylan's earlier south-of-the-border adventure songs "Just Like Tom Thumb's Blues" from 1965 and "Romance in Durango" from 1976. They interpret the song as being narrated by a man who "hopes to find the woman who has left him" while he "questions the one who appears as his guide (or is it his conscience?). Which road to follow? Where is his loved one hiding? This long journey, full of terrifying scenes, ends with a final struggle between good and evil (like the New Testament's Battle of Armageddon)". They also note that "the atmosphere of the song is Spanish or Mexican, without lapsing into caricature".

== Critical reception ==
Spectrum Culture included the song on a list of "Bob Dylan's 20 Best Songs of the 1970s". In an article accompanying the list, critic Justin Cober-Lake calls it "the highlight" of Street-Legal and praises it for the way it blends "mythic language" with "concrete detail". He specifically sees the song as juxtaposing the "Old West" and the Bible, noting that this imagery is well-served by the music: "The thoughtful orchestration and arrangement develop the song by leaving enough space for the sand to get in (in 1978, Dylan needed to resist over-complicating the track). The horns create the setting but then get out of the way. The song builds just a little, peaking with Dylan’s frustration at his unanswered questions. The horns pick up again to lead us out of the wilderness without letting us forget the desolation, the band ending an apocalyptic vision with a strange (but fitting) decrescendo".

A 2021 Guardian article included it on a list of "80 Bob Dylan songs everyone should know". Rolling Stone listed the song at #100 on its list of 100 greatest Bob Dylan songs, describing it as a "baffling-yet-haunting country-rock epic".

== Other versions ==
A studio rehearsal version, recorded at Rundown Studios in Santa Monica, California on October 28, 1980, was released as the opening track on the compilation The Bootleg Series Vol. 16: Springtime in New York 1980–1985. In his liner notes, Damine Love claims this version is "more stunningly ominous" than the original Street-Legal version.

== Live performances ==
According to his official site, Dylan performed the song 265 times in concert between 1978 and 2011. It is the only song from Street-Legal that he continued to perform with any regularity after his 1978 World Tour. A live performance from Lucca, Italy on July 6, 1998, was included on the Japanese EP Not Dark Yet: Dylan Alive Vol. 2, released on April 21, 1999. The live debut occurred at the Universal Amphitheatre in Los Angeles on June 1, 1978, and the last performance (to date) took place at the Sydney Entertainment Centre in Sydney, Australia on April 27, 2011.

== Notable covers ==
"Señor" has been covered by more than two dozen artists. Among the most notable versions are those by Tim O'Brien on his album Red on Blonde, the Jerry Garcia Band for their self-titled 1991 album and by Gillian Welch and David Rawlings for their 2020 album All the Good Times (Are Past & Gone). The Jerry Garcia Band's cover of the song is prominently featured in Larry Charles' 2003 film Masked and Anonymous, which Dylan co-wrote and starred in. The song was covered by Willie Nelson and Calexico for the 2007 film I'm Not There. Rolling Stone included that version on its list of best Dylan covers, ranking it at #37.

The song is also featured in Conor McPherson's musical play Girl from the North Country, which is scored entirely by Bob Dylan songs and had its premiere at the Old Vic in London in 2017. The song is included on the Original London Cast Recording album, also released in 2017, and the Original Broadway Cast Recording album released in 2021.
