= Baby, Stop Crying =

- German picture sleeve

Single by Bob Dylan

from the album Street-Legal
- B-side: "New Pony" (UK/US); "We Better Talk This Over" (Europe)
- Released: July 14, 1978 (UK); July 21, 1978 (Japan); July 31, 1978 (US)
- Recorded: April 1978
- Genre: Rock
- Length: 5:17
- Label: Columbia
- Songwriter: Bob Dylan
- Producer: Don DeVito

Bob Dylan singles chronology
"Stuck Inside of Mobile with the Memphis Blues Again (Live)" (1976)	"Baby, Stop Crying" (1978)	"Changing of the Guards" (1978)

"Baby, Stop Crying" is a song written by Bob Dylan, released in the summer of 1978 as a single and on Street Legal. The song charted at #13 in the UK and was a top-ten song in much of Europe, although it failed to chart in the United States.

== Lyrical interpretation and reception ==
The song's narrator is a desperate man attempting to play the role of consoler to a despairing woman, asking her for a pistol in the opening verse, and claiming he "can't tell right from wrong". Commenting on the content of this song, Dylan once said, "The man in that song has his hand out and is not afraid of getting it bit".

Dylan scholar Tony Attwood sees the song as having lyrical roots in Robert Johnson's "Stop Breaking Down".

Like many of the tracks from Street Legal, "Baby, Stop Crying" features a saxophone and a trio of female backup singers. According to Billboard the female voices provide an "exciting counterpoint" to Dylan's "raspy" vocal performance. Cash Box said that it "has a tight, repetitive hook, backing singers, strong sax solo and organ work." Record World said that "Old fans will lean toward [Dylan's] customary throaty vocals while new audiences might latch on to the high female background singing that gives it just a touch of r&b."

== Live performances ==
Dylan performed the song live in concert 39 times. All performances were in 1978.

== Covers ==
- Terrance Simien: Jam the Jazzfest (1998)
