= Billy Cross =

American guitarist and producer (born 1946)

- Born: July 15, 1946 (age 80); Manhattan, New York
- Genres: Rock, Blues
- Occupations: Record producer, musician, songwriter
- Instruments: Vocals, guitar
- Years active: 1960–present
- Website: billycross.comlink is dead

Billy Cross (born July 15, 1946) is an American guitarist, singer and producer from Manhattan, New York who has lived in Denmark since 1980. He has been part of the Danish bands: Delta Cross Band, Cross-Schack-Ostermann, and Everybody's Talking.

== Career ==
Billy Cross graduated from Columbia College-- the undergraduate liberal arts college of Columbia University in 1968 as an English literature major. He is the nephew of Columbia professor and noted literary critic Lionel Trilling.

Cross began as a professional musician in the United States in 1960 as a studio musician and assistant producer. He played briefly with the 1950s nostalgia act Sha Na Na and played guitar in the Broadway show of Hair. He became the musical director of the National touring company of Hair in 1972. Cross also played in Jim Rado's after-Hair show: Rainbow in NYC. He played guitar on Jobriath's two albums and was a member of his live band. He first visited Denmark in 1974,--giving concerts in Copenhagen--returning there often despite working with Bob Dylan and Meat Loaf at the time. Billy Cross was a member of Dylan's band from late 1977 to the spring of 1979 and took part in recording Dylan's live LP Bob Dylan at Budokan in 1978 and the studio LP Street-Legal. He was also a member of the New York based trio Topaz that released one LP in the USA in 1977. He also played guitar on Robert Gordon/Link Wray's first two albums Robert Gordon & Link Wray and Fresh Fish Special. He also played on Link's album Bullshot.

Billy Cross recorded the album No Overdubs with the Danish blues/rock band Delta Blues Band in 1979. He became a regular member - with the band changing its name to the Delta Cross Band to welcome him. With Delta Cross Band, Billy Cross released four more albums: Rave On (1979), Up Front (1981), "Astro Kid" (1982) and Tough Times (1990). The greatest hits CD Dirty Trax was released some time later.

In 1980 Cross produced Danish rock singer C.V. Jørgensen's Tidens tern while also playing guitar and co-writing the music on the recording. The other members of Delta Cross Band also played on the album. Cross remained committed to Delta Cross Band - which had slowed their activities down considerably after 1983 with fewer concerts.

"Take Me Back", from Up Front, was covered by Bonnie Tyler for her comeback album Faster Than the Speed of Night in 1983. He released Billy Cross his first solo album in 1986.

As a producer and a studio musician Billy Cross produced works by: Anne Dorte Michelsen, C.V. Jørgensen, Björn Afzelius, Allan Olsen, Henning Stærk, Søs Fenger, Henrik Strube, Jørn Hoel, Pretty Maids, Johnny Madsen, Lars Lilholt and the Danish band Dalton made up of Lilholt, Madsen and Olsen.

Everybody's Talking released four CD's: Everybody's Talking, Talk of the Town, Louisiana and Now We're Talking between 2003 and 2010. They released We Need to Talk in 2017.

He released his second solo album Life Is Good in 2004 followed by another album So Far So Good in 2009. He came back with his album The Dream Hasn't Changed in 2012. He released his fifth solo LP, Goodbye to the 60s in 2015. His sixth album The Prettiest Train was released in 2021. Together with Rasmus and Jonas Dissing and Las Nissen Copenhagen Skyline, an album of Billy's songs sung by Rasmus together with a previously unreleased Bob Dylan song is expected to be released May 27th 2022. Billy Cross has written two books: the American cook book "Mit amerikanske køkken" (2001) and a book of memoirs "Så langt så godt – et liv med rock" (2010), both in Danish.

== Bibliography ==
- Mit amerikanske køkken, cook book (2001)
- Så langt så godt – et liv med rock, memoirs (2010)

== Discography ==
=== Albums ===
| Year | Song | Peak | Certification |
| Year | Song | DK | Certification |
|---|---|---|---|
| 1986 | Billy Cross | – | |
| 2004 | Life Is Good | – | |
| 2009 | So Far So Good | – | |
| 2009 | The Dream Hasn't Changed | 15 | |
| 2015 | Goodbye to the Sixties | – | |
