= Rolling Thunder Revue =

1975–76 concert tour by Bob Dylan

- Tour by Bob Dylan
- Harvard Square Theater concert poster, November 20, 1975
- Location: North America
- Start date: October 30, 1975
- End date: May 25, 1976
- Legs: 2
- No. of shows: 57; First leg: 30; Second leg: 27

Bob Dylan concert chronology
- Bob Dylan and the Band Tour (1974); Rolling Thunder Revue (1975–76); World Tour (1978)

The Rolling Thunder Revue was a 1975–76 concert tour by American singer-songwriter Bob Dylan with numerous musicians and collaborators. The purpose of the tour was to allow Dylan, who was a major recording artist and concert performer, to play in smaller auditoriums in less populated cities where he could be more intimate with his audiences.

Some of the performers on the tour were Joan Baez, Roger McGuinn, Joni Mitchell, Ronee Blakely and Ramblin' Jack Elliott. Bob Neuwirth assembled backing musicians from the recording sessions for Dylan's Desire album, including violinist Scarlet Rivera, bassist Rob Stoner, and drummer Howie Wyeth, plus Mick Ronson on guitar. The tour included 57 concerts in two legs: the first in the American northeast and Canada in the fall of 1975, and the second in the American South and southwest in the spring of 1976.

Many of the songs performed in the first leg were drawn from Desire, which was released in January 1976, between the two legs of the tour. The tour was thoroughly documented through film, sound recording, and in print. A documentary about the tour, directed by Martin Scorsese, titled Rolling Thunder Revue: A Bob Dylan Story by Martin Scorsese, was released by Netflix and in select theaters in June 2019.

== Origins ==
The idea behind the tour, Dylan said, was to "play for the people", the people who never get good seats at his larger concerts due to higher ticket cost and inconvenient locations. Dylan chose to play in smaller auditoriums because, he said, "the atmosphere in small halls is more conducive to what we do". His New York musician friend David Blue felt that Dylan clearly wanted to get back to being closer to his audience after becoming a major music star, saying, "Bob's just an ordinary [...] guy, a great songwriter who got swept up in this whole fame thing and was smart enough to know how to control it, who rode with it and was shrewd, damn shrewd. And now he's just paying everyone back with this tour. It's like a family scene."

Dylan named the tour after hearing the continuous sounds of thunder one day. He conceived the tour in the summer of 1975 while he was living in Greenwich Village, and began co-writing with his friend, Jacques Levy, with whom he wrote various songs, including "Hurricane".

In October 1975, shortly before completing Desire, Dylan held rehearsals for his second tour in two years (following an eight-year hiatus) at New York City's midtown Studio Instrument Rentals space. Bassist Rob Stoner, drummer/pianist Howie Wyeth and violinist Scarlet Rivera were retained from the Desire sessions for the rehearsals. Joining them were T-Bone Burnett (electric guitar, piano), Steven Soles (acoustic guitar, electric guitar, backing vocals) and David Mansfield (dobro, mandolin, violin, pedal steel guitar). Although the trio had been dismissed during the Desire sessions in an attempt to focus the overall production, Dylan yielded to his original instincts and decided to rehire them for the tour. Luther Rix (drums, percussion) was also added at an indeterminate point.

I've known these guys for a long time and I love them dearly, but everybody is slightly unstable. But it's delightful working with Bobby again. He's relatively impossible to follow and that's a challenge, but I need that.

— Joan Baez
Joan Baez kissing Bob Dylan

When rehearsals began, many of the musicians were apparently uninformed about plans for an upcoming tour. At the same time, Dylan was casually inviting others to join in with the band. According to Stoner, the group rehearsed "for like a day or two – it [was] not really so much a rehearsal as like a jam, tryin' to sort it out. Meanwhile, all these people who eventually became the Rolling Thunder Revue started dropping in. Joan Baez was showing up. Roger McGuinn was there. They were all there. We had no idea what the purpose for these jams was, except we were being invited to jam."

According to Lou Kemp, a friend of Dylan's who eventually organized the tour, the Rolling Thunder Revue "would go out at night and run into people, and we'd just invite them to come with us. We started out with a relatively small group of musicians and support people, and we ended up with a caravan." Uninterested in performing in a country/folk milieu, Patti Smith amicably declined Dylan's invitation. Bruce Springsteen also turned down an invitation "because he had plenty of touring commitments of his own and was on a roll" after the breakthrough success of Born to Run, released that August. Dylan did add one surprising element to the Rolling Thunder Revue: Mick Ronson, the lead guitarist and arranger in David Bowie's former backing band, The Spiders from Mars.

Another musician invited on the tour was introduced to Dylan on October 22, when Dylan went to see David Blue perform at The Other End. It was there that he met Ronee Blakley, the actress/singer who had recently starred in Robert Altman's celebrated film Nashville. At the end of Blue's show, Blakley joined Dylan on-stage for a few songs, joined by poet Allen Ginsberg; afterwards, Dylan extended her an invitation to join the Rolling Thunder Revue. She initially declined due to prior commitments but eventually changed her mind and appeared at rehearsals two days later. She later recalled, "Oh I loved him, right away, just loved him. He was exactly what I thought he would be like. Funny and mysterious and shy and dear and vulnerable."

However, the same day Blakley showed up for rehearsal, Dylan returned to the recording studio to re-record "Hurricane" (due to legal concerns involving the song's original lyrics). Employing Blakley as a substitute for Emmylou Harris (who had prior engagements to attend to), Dylan quickly recut "Hurricane", the last recorded work done for Desire before its release in January 1976.

On October 23, 1975, owner Mike Porco's 61st birthday, Dylan and a group of friends took over Gerde's Folk City as the main show was ending. Dylan and Joan Baez sang "One Too Many Mornings", followed onstage by Ramblin' Jack Elliott, Eric Andersen, Patti Smith, Arlen Roth, Bette Midler, Buzzy Linhart, Phil Ochs and others. Dylan and his group brought in lights and cameras and filmed the session, which began well after midnight; a brief scene of Phil Ochs trying to tune Eric Andersen's guitar from open to regular tuning made it into Renaldo and Clara. A week later, on October 30, the Rolling Thunder Revue played its first concert.

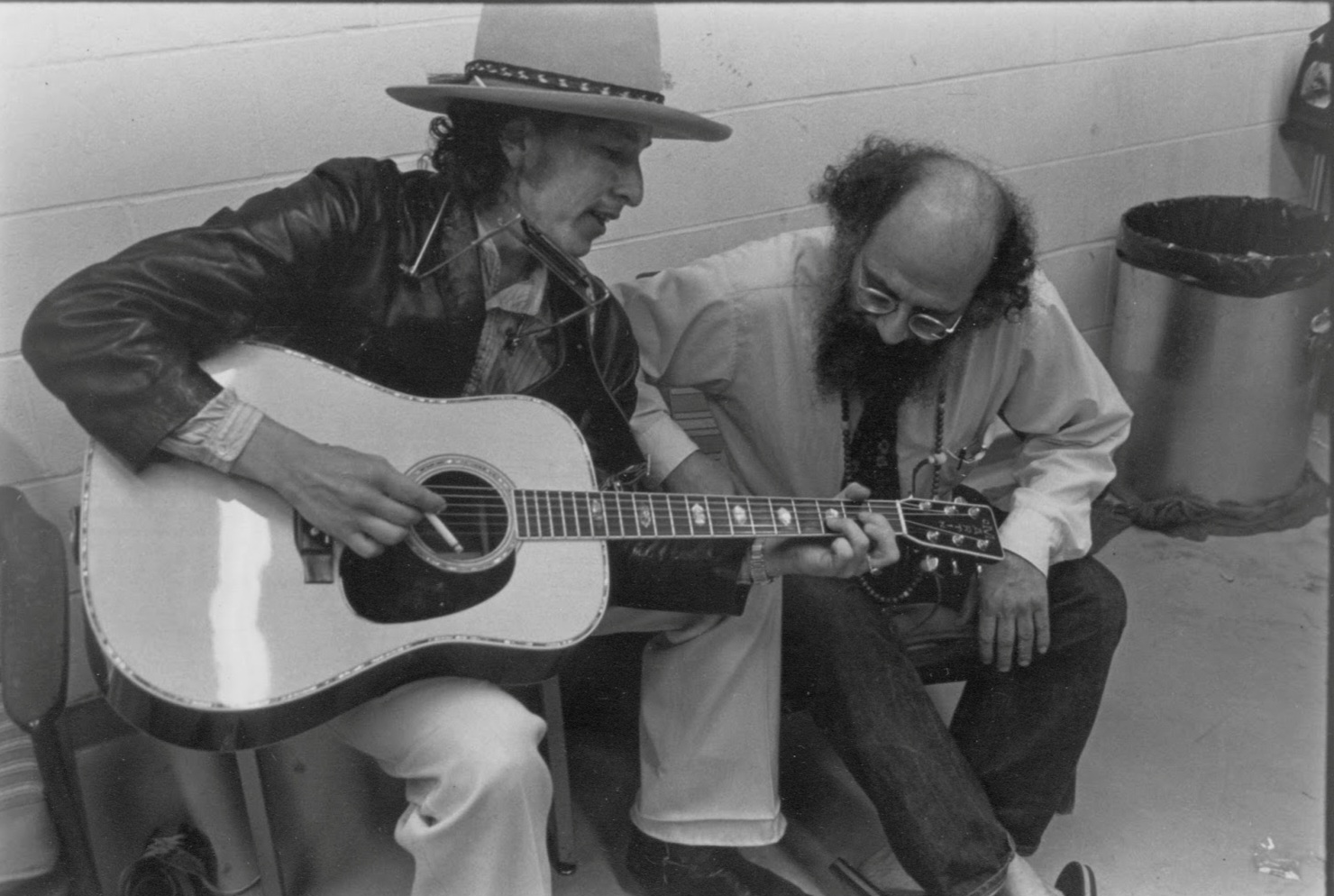
Dylan with Allen Ginsberg on the Rolling Thunder Revue

Sometime in October, Dylan also contacted an old friend and filmmaker, Howard Alk. Dylan's ambitions apparently included a film of the tour, and Alk accepted Dylan's offer to shoot the film. When the tour rehearsals were still in progress, Alk reportedly began filming scenes in Greenwich Village for possible inclusion in the film.

Dylan contacted actor/playwright Sam Shepard, then considered to be a relatively obscure cult figure, to work as the film's screenwriter. He was closely associated with several figures in Dylan's circle, including Jacques Levy, who directed many of Shepard's 1960s Off-Off-Broadway plays; Patti Smith, who was Shepard's former lover and dramatic collaborator; and Allen Ginsberg, who had worked with Shepard on Robert Frank's Me and My Brother in 1969. Dylan asked Shepard if he had seen Marcel Carné's Les Enfants du Paradis or François Truffaut's Shoot the Piano Player, and told him that those were the kinds of films he wanted to produce on the tour.

While Ginsberg accompanied the tour for most of its 1975 run, his planned recitations, as well as some performances by other Revue members, were cut before the opening date to keep the concerts at a manageable length.

== 1975 fall tour ==
He [Dylan] was electric during those tours, and had boundless energy and incredible strength of performance. When he sang "Along the Watchtower," it was just riveting. The words were like staccato bullets, and every song had a peak energy.
It was such a powerful and magical experience . . . We received outrageous reviews worldwide and the tour was an enormous sensation. . . It was confirmed for me that I was with a living genius, on the level of Shakespeare of our time. Just profound, prolific and profound.

— tour violinist Scarlet Rivera
Scarlet Rivera, Roger McGuinn, and Bob Dylan

On October 30, Dylan held the first Rolling Thunder Revue show at the War Memorial Auditorium in Plymouth, Massachusetts. Intended to contrast with the bombast of his 1974 tour with The Band, the first leg of the tour was small, spanning only thirty shows. The majority of the first Revue was booked at intimate venues, including smaller arenas, theaters and gymnasia; aside from two shows in Upstate New York, a four-show Canadian leg and the concluding concerts in the New York metropolitan area, the tour's itinerary was entirely confined to New England. However, the secrecy surrounding the Revue's intended destinations, the new material Dylan was premiering, and the inclusion of Joan Baez on the same bill as Dylan for the first time in a decade ensured prominent media coverage.

On November 2, 1975, the tour stopped at the University of Lowell. Dylan's inspiration for playing Lowell was Jack Kerouac, a pivotal influence on his oeuvre who was born and raised in the city. Dylan, Beat Generation colleague Ginsberg and various band members visited Kerouac's gravesite.

According to Larry Sloman, who documented the tour in On the Road with Bob Dylan (1978), "Onstage it was like a carnival. Bobby Neuwirth and the back-up band [dubbed 'Guam'] warmed up the audience. Next, Dylan ambled on to do about five songs. After intermission, the curtain rose to an incredible sight, Bob and Joan, together again after all these years."

Dylan and Baez often opened the second half of the show duetting in the dark on "Blowin' in the Wind". Then Baez would take center stage with a dynamic six-song set, followed by a solo set from Dylan. He was joined by the band for a few numbers, until the finale song, Woody Guthrie's "This Land Is Your Land," featuring everyone on stage. The spirit was considered extremely warm, leading Joni Mitchell, who only intended to play one concert, to stay on for the remaining three nights of the tour.

The dramatic finale of the tour took place on December 8 in Madison Square Garden, where, to an audience of 14,000, Dylan performed a benefit concert for his latest cause, the imprisoned boxer Rubin Carter. The concert was titled "The Night of The Hurricane," in reference to Dylan's song, "Hurricane", which was released in November 1975. Among those appearing on stage were Muhammad Ali and Coretta Scott King, the widow of the slain civil rights activist Martin Luther King Jr.

Performers included Roberta Flack, Robbie Robertson, Ronee Blakely, Joan Baez, Joni Mitchell and violinist Scarlet Rivera. In the audience were a number of key political figures, boxers, and movie stars. And at the time of the concert, Carter was an inmate at Trenton State Prison, where he reacted after learning of the benefit on his behalf and the song dedicated to him: "Wow, man. I mean, he took this case, this nine years of whatever, and put it together, wop, like that, and covered every level, every facet of it. I said, 'Man, this cat's a genius. He's giving the people the truth.' And it was inspiring to me. I told myself, 'Rubin, you got to keep pushing, 'cause you must be doing something right, you got all these good people coming to try and help you.'"

Dylan made the surprising theatrical choice of wearing whiteface make-up at many of the shows. In some shows, he walked on stage wearing a plastic mask, only to toss it aside after the first song to play harmonica on "It Ain't Me, Babe". According to Rivera, one heckler asked Dylan "Why are you wearing a mask?" to which Dylan replied, "The meaning is in the words."

=== Critical responses and film ===
A number of critics highly praised the tour. "The Rolling Thunder Revue shows remain some of the finest music Dylan ever made with a live band", wrote Clinton Heylin. "Gone was the traditionalism of The Band. Instead he found a whole set of textures rarely found in rock. The idea of blending the pedal-steel syncopation of Mansfield, Ronson's glam-rock lead breaks, and Rivera's electric violin made for something as musically layered as Dylan's lyrics ... [Dylan] also displayed a vocal precision rare even for him, snapping and stretching words to cajole nuances of meaning from each and every line." According to Riley, "These are rugged and inspired reworkings of many Dylan standards—[Dylan] even talks casually to the audience (now a thing of the past). He lights into a biting electric version of 'It Ain't Me, Babe,' and then a thoroughly convincing rock take of 'The Lonesome Death of Hattie Carroll' ... and an 'Isis' that makes the Desire take sound like a greeting card."

There is a critical consensus that the tour failed in one regard, the making of the film Renaldo and Clara. Shepard soon discovered that his nominal function as screenwriter was somewhat superfluous, for most of the film's dramatic sequences would be entirely improvised with little guidance or direction from Dylan. Shepard elected to record his impressionistic divagations in a journal eventually published as The Rolling Thunder Logbook (1977).

== 1976 spring tour ==
A second Hurricane Carter benefit was held at the Astrodome in Houston, Texas on January 25, bridging the two legs of the tour. For this performance, Ringo Starr, Stephen Stills and Joe Vitale augmented the core band. Before the concert, Dylan chose to meet with the man that discovered him, Roy Silver, and Silver's partner, manager Richard Flanzer, for some advice. Flanzer and Silver quickly provided several stars (including Stevie Wonder and Dr. John) to help make this concert the most commercially successful event of the tour, with Dylan giving a strident performance. Dylan asked Flanzer to accompany him on the chartered flight to oversee these guest stars.

Rehearsals for the spring leg were held in Clearwater, Florida during April, and the first show was on April 18 at the Civic Center in Lakeland, Florida. With an itinerary dominated by arenas and stadiums due to the ballooning budget of Renaldo and Clara, the tour continued throughout April and May in the American South and Southwest. (Performances by Dylan and Baez during the Clearwater rehearsals were taped and aired on The Midnight Special.) Although most of the fall complement (including Baez, McGuinn, Ronson and the Neuwirth-led Guam) returned, Elliott, Blakley, Rix, Ginsberg and Shepard moved on to other endeavors. Kinky Friedman and Donna Weiss joined the ensemble as featured performers, essentially replacing the former two, while percussionist Gary Burke replaced Rix. New guests included Dennis Hopper, who recited Rudyard Kipling's "If" at The Warehouse in New Orleans. Joni Mitchell returned to preview two songs ("Black Crow" and "Song for Sharon") from Hejira in Fort Worth.

The penultimate show of the tour took place on May 23 at Hughes Stadium in Fort Collins, Colorado. Comments about it typified the feeling about the spring tour: "Although the band has been playing together longer, the charm has gone out of their exchanges", wrote Tim Riley. "The Rolling Thunder Revue, so joyful and electrifying in its first performances, had just plain run out of steam", wrote music critic Janet Maslin for Rolling Stone.

The final Rolling Thunder show took place in Utah on May 25, at Salt Palace in Salt Lake City. It was the first time Dylan had ever performed in Utah. News journalist David Beck, who came to the show, wrote that "in ensemble, they are, if anything, even better than alone. Put together by Dylan with rigid professionalism, the show is quick, well-paced, varied, funny and exciting. . . it was as good as you would expect it to be, with artists of this caliber; better, because of the time these people have spent together, because of their obvious admiration for one another, because of the unifying and uplifting presence of the Rolling Thunder band. Long may it roll.

The show in Utah would be Dylan's last performance for twenty-one months (save for a short set backed by The Band at The Last Waltz in November 1976), and it would be another two years before Dylan recorded another album of new material.

== Legacy ==
I've been seeing Bob perform since 1966. I've never seen him as good as he was during the Rolling Thunder tour, night in, night out. He was just amazing, phenomenal energy, and incredible passion. They tried to go out and do something unique and they succeeded. It was just amazing music every night--the most incredible conviction and spirit.

— Larry Sloman, Rolling Stone writer

The May 23 Colorado show was filmed for the September 1976 NBC television special Hard Rain; the Hard Rain live album containing selections from that and another late May date was released simultaneously. The television special garnered poor reviews and disappointing ratings, despite a TV Guide cover of and interview with Dylan. Sales of the album were relatively modest in the United States, where it peaked at No. 17.

Dylan and Shepard's completed film Renaldo and Clara would not be released until 1978 to a largely negative critical reception. For many years, it was the only official release documenting the live shows from the fall 1975 leg. However, a majority of the film consisted of the haphazard, fictional drama filmed during the tour. Later in 1978, an edited version of the film appeared that omitted many of the dramatic scenes in favor of focusing more on the performances.

Most performances from the fall 1975 tour were professionally recorded (in addition to wide bootlegging). The Bootleg Series Vol. 5: Bob Dylan Live 1975, The Rolling Thunder Revue, incorporating performances from a number of the fall shows, saw issue in 2002. As the first official release to capture the Revue at its peak, it was warmly received by fans and critics. In August 2010, a source close to Dylan told Rolling Stone that a documentary about the Rolling Thunder tour had been in development for years and could be released relatively soon.

In June 2019, Netflix released a pseudo-documentary about the tour, directed by Martin Scorsese, titled Rolling Thunder Revue: A Bob Dylan Story by Martin Scorsese. According to Netflix, the film "captures the troubled spirit of America in 1975 and the joyous music that Dylan performed during the fall of that year. Part documentary, part concert film, part fever dream, 'Rolling Thunder' is a one of a kind experience, from master filmmaker Martin Scorsese."

== Tour dates ==
=== Autumn leg ===
Date	City	Country	Venue
North America
October 30, 1975	Plymouth, MA	United States	Memorial Hall
October 31, 1975	Plymouth, MA	United States	Memorial Hall
November 1, 1975	North Dartmouth, MA	United States	Southeastern Massachusetts University
November 2, 1975	Lowell, MA	United States	University of Lowell
November 4, 1975	Providence, RI	United States	Providence Civic Center
November 6, 1975	Springfield, MA	United States	Springfield Civic Center
November 8, 1975	Burlington, VT	United States	Patrick Gym
November 9, 1975	Durham, NH	United States	Lundholm Gym
November 11, 1975	Waterbury, CT	United States	Palace Theater
November 13, 1975	New Haven, CT	United States	Veterans Memorial Coliseum
November 15, 1975	Niagara Falls, NY	United States	Niagara Falls Convention Center
November 17, 1975	Rochester, NY	United States	Community War Memorial
November 19, 1975	Worcester, MA	United States	Worcester Memorial Auditorium
November 20, 1975	Cambridge, MA	United States	Harvard Square Theater
November 21, 1975	Boston, MA	United States	Boston Music Hall
November 22, 1975	Waltham, MA	United States	Brandeis University
November 24, 1975	Hartford, CT	United States	Hartford Civic Center
November 26, 1975	Augusta, Maine	United States	Augusta Civic Center
November 27, 1975	Bangor, Maine	United States	Bangor Auditorium
November 29, 1975	Quebec City	Canada	Colisée de Québec
December 1, 1975	Toronto	Canada	Maple Leaf Gardens
December 2, 1975	Toronto	Canada	Maple Leaf Gardens
December 4, 1975	Montreal	Canada	Montreal Forum
December 7, 1975	Clinton	United States	Edna Mahan Correctional Facility for Women
December 8, 1975	New York City	United States	Madison Square Garden

=== Carter benefit show ===
Date	City	Country	Venue
January 25, 1976	Houston	United States	Astrodome

=== Spring leg ===
Date	City	Country	Venue
United States
April 18, 1976	Lakeland	United States	Lakeland Civic Center
April 20, 1976	St. Petersburg	United States	Bayfront Arena
April 21, 1976	Tampa	United States	Curtis Hixon Hall
April 22, 1976	Belleair	United States	Starlight Ballroom
April 23, 1976	Orlando	United States	Orlando Sports Stadium
April 25, 1976	Gainesville	United States	Florida Field
April 27, 1976	Tallahassee	United States	Tully Gymnasium
April 28, 1976	Pensacola	United States	UWF Field House
April 29, 1976	Mobile	United States	Mobile Expo Hall
May 1, 1976	Hattiesburg	United States	Reed Green Coliseum
May 3, 1976	New Orleans	United States	The Warehouse
May 4, 1976	Baton Rouge	United States	LSU Assembly Center
May 8, 1976	Houston	United States	Hofheinz Pavilion
May 10, 1976	Corpus Christi	United States	Corpus Christi Memorial Coliseum
May 11, 1976	San Antonio	United States	San Antonio Municipal Auditorium
May 12, 1976	Austin	United States	Austin Municipal Auditorium
May 15, 1976	Gatesville	United States	Gatesville State School for Boys
May 16, 1976	Fort Worth	United States	Tarrant County Convention Center
May 18, 1976	Oklahoma City	United States	Jim Norick Arena
May 19, 1976	Wichita	United States	Henry Levitt Arena
May 23, 1976	Fort Collins	United States	Hughes Stadium
May 25, 1976	Salt Lake City	United States	Salt Palace

=== Box office score data ===
List of box office score data with date, city, venue, attendance, gross, references
Date (1976)	City	Venue	Attendance	Gross	Ref(s)
April 25	Gainesville, United States	Florida Field	20,016	$175,140	
May 18	Oklahoma City, United States	Jim Norick Arena	10,909	$94,600	

== See also ==
- Hard Rain (1976)
- The Bootleg Series Vol. 5: Bob Dylan Live 1975, The Rolling Thunder Revue (2002)
- Bob Dylan – The Rolling Thunder Revue: The 1975 Live Recordings (2019)
- Rolling Thunder Revue: A Bob Dylan Story by Martin Scorsese, 2019 American pseudo-documentary film

== Sources ==
- Heylin, Clinton (April 1, 2011). Behind the Shades: The 20th Anniversary Edition. Faber & Faber. ISBN 978-0-571-27241-9.
- Heylin, Clinton (April 29, 2003). Bob Dylan: Behind the Shades Revisited. HarperCollins. ISBN 978-0-06-052569-9.
- Riley, Tim (December 29, 2010). Hard Rain: A Dylan Commentary. ISBN 9780307773043.
- Sloman, Larry (2002). On the Road with Bob Dylan. Three Rivers Press. ISBN 978-1-4000-4596-9.
