= Welcome (disambiguation) =

A welcome is a kind of greeting.

Welcome may also refer to

== Geography ==
- Welcome metro station, Delhi Metro station
- Welcome Islands, a small rocky archipelago to the north of the main island of South Georgia
- Welcome, Ontario, Canada

=== United States ===
- Welcome, Pope County, Arkansas
- Welcome, Florida
- Welcome, Georgia
- Welcome, Maryland
- Welcome, Minnesota
- Welcome, Nevada
- Welcome, Louisiana
- Welcome, St. John the Baptist Parish, Louisiana
- Welcome, North Carolina
- Welcome, South Carolina
- Welcome, Texas
- Welcome, Virginia
- Welcome, Washington
- Welcome, Wisconsin, a historical name for Bear Creek, Outagamie County, Wisconsin
- Welcome Creek, in Welcome Creek Wilderness, Montana

== People ==
- Welcome (name), including a list of people with the name

== Film and TV ==
- Welcome (1986 film), a Soviet paint-on-glass-animated short film adapted from Thidwick the Big-Hearted Moose
- Welcome (film series), Indian Hindi-language comedy film series
  - Welcome (2007 film), first film in the series by Anees Bazmee
- Welcome (2009 film), 2009 French film by Philippe Lioret
- Welcome (TV series), 2020 South Korean television series
- Welcome – Baazi Mehmaan Nawazi Ki, an Indian TV show

== Music ==
=== Albums ===
- Welcome (Santana album), a 1973 album
- Welcome (Ronee Blakley album), a 1975 album
- Welcome (SBB album), a 1979 album
- Welcome (Dharma Bums album), a 1992 album
- Welcome (Taproot album), the second studio album by Taproot
- Welcome (Doyle Bramhall II album)
- Welcome (Patrick Nuo album), a 2003 album
- Welcome (EP), a 2011 EP by Idles
- Welcome, a 2021 EP by Daði Freyr
- Welcome, an album by Brian Eno and Harmonia that went unreleased until 1997
- Welcame (album), a 2014 album by Rise of the Northstar

=== Songs ===
- "Welcome" (Erick Sermon song), a 1995 song
- "Welcome" (Fort Minor song), a 2015 song
- "Welcome" (Martin Garrix song), a 2016 song
- "Welcome" (IDK song), a 2026 song
- "Welcome", a song by American nu metal band Slipknot
- "Welcome", a song by The Who
- "Welcome", song by Marta Sánchez 2015, No.1 in Mexico
- "The Welcome", song by Fred Frith on Cheap at Half the Price

== Other ==
- Welcome Nugget, the name given to a 69 kg gold nugget discovered at Bakery Hill in Ballarat, Victoria
- Welcome sign, a road sign at the border of a region that introduces or welcomes visitors
- Welcome Stadium, a multi-purpose stadium in Dayton, Ohio
- USS Welcome (SP-1175), a United States Navy patrol boat commissioned in 1917 and stricken in 1919
- USCGC Point Welcome (WPB-82329), a Point-class cutter of the United States Coast Guard
- Club Atlético Welcome, a basketball club in Montevideo, member of the Uruguayan Basketball Federation.

== See also ==
- Wellcome, a supermarket chain
- Welcome Back (disambiguation)
- Welcome Home (disambiguation)
- Unwelcome (disambiguation)
- Wellcom, a cell-phone operator of Thailand
- Wellcome Trust, a United Kingdom charitable foundation focused on health research
- Welkom, a city in South Africa
- velcom, a cell-phone operator of Belarus
