= USee4Yourself =

2021 album by IDK

- Cover for standard and Complete editions; deluxe edition features a blue background

Studio album by IDK
- Released: July 9, 2021
- Studio: Dean's List House of Hits (Cypress, Texas)
- Genre: Hip-hop
- Length: 43:51
- Label: Clue No Clue; Warner
- Producer: Acyde; Almatic; ATL Jacob; Blue Rondo; Bobby Raps; CashMoneyAP; DJ Dahi; IDK; Illingsworth; Kurtis McKenzie; LDG Beats; the Neptunes; Rascal; Stonegroov; Teddy Roxpin; T-Minus

IDK chronology
IDK & Friends 2 (2020)	USee4Yourself (2021)	Simple. (2022)

Singles from USee4Yourself
- 1. "Shoot My Shot" Released: April 16, 2021; 2. "Peloton" Released: June 11, 2021; 3. "PradadaBang" Released: July 2, 2021; 4. "Red" Released: July 9, 2021

USee4Yourself (stylized in all caps) is the second studio album by American rapper IDK. It was released on July 9, 2021, through Clue No Clue and Warner Records. It features guest appearances from Young Thug, Offset, Westside Gunn, the late MF Doom, Jay Electronica, Lucky Daye, Sir, T-Pain, the Neptunes, Swae Lee, Rico Nasty, Slick Rick, and Sevyn Streeter; Trippie Redd, Jvck James, Shy Glizzy, Lil Yachty, JID, Kenny Mason, and Royce da 5'9" additionally feature on its deluxe edition. IDK primarily handled production himself, alongside high-profile producers including ATL Jacob, DJ Dahi, CashMoneyAP, and T-Minus. It serves as a sequel to his debut album Is He Real? (2019), and follows IDK & Friends 2 (2020), his soundtrack for the documentary Basketball County: In the Water.

== Background ==
IDK stated, "I needed to make this album to become a better person", and expressed during the process, "took away a sense of fear... of people finding out who I am".

== Critical reception ==
Professional ratings
Aggregate scores
Source	Rating
Metacritic	79/100
Review scores
Source	Rating
AllMusic	4/5 stars
Clash	8/10
Gigwise	7/10 stars
HipHopDX	
The Line of Best Fit	
NME	4/5 stars

USee4Yourself received "generally favorable" reviews from critics. At Metacritic, which assigns a normalized rating out of 100 to reviews from professional publications, the album received an average score of 79, based on 5 reviews.

== Track listing ==
USee4Yourself – Standard edition
No.	Title	Writer(s)	Producer(s)	Length
1.	"3018091821"	Jason Mills; Derek Gamlam; Benjamin Cooper	IDK; Blue Rondo^{[a]}	1:11
2.	"Santa Monica Blvd"	Mills; Gamlam; Jacob Canady; Robert Richardson	ATL Jacob; Bobby Raps; IDK^{[c]}; Blue Rondo^{[a]}	2:41
3.	"Dogs Don't Lie"	Mills; Brian Aronow; Jesse Brotter; Derek Gamlam; Jonathan Gilad; Kurtis McKenzie; Dacoury Natche; Caroline Ramani	McKenzie; DJ Dahi; IDK^{[c]}; Blue Rondo^{[a]}	1:57
4.	"Truth"	Mills	IDK; Blue Rondo^{[c]}	0:33
5.	"PradadaBang" (with Young Thug)	Mills; Jeffery Williams; Gamlam; JaVale McGee; Alvin Isaacs	IDK; Blue Rondo; McGee^{[c]}; Almatic^{[c]}	2:25
6.	"Shoot My Shot" (with Offset)	Mills; Kiari Cephus; Tyler Williams; Luke Mauti	T-Minus; Luca Mauti^{[c]}; IDK^{[a]}	2:52
7.	"Red" (with Westside Gunn, MF Doom, and Jay Electronica)	Mills; Alvin Worthy; Daniel Dumile; Elpadaro Allah; Donovan Fort; Gamlam; Obi Nwadije; Philippe Briche; Byron Thomas; Michel Ripoche; Bryan Williams; Timothy Thedford	IDK; Illingsworth; Blue Rondo^{[c]}; Nwadije^{[c]}	4:15
8.	"Jelly"	Mills; Cooper	IDK; Blue Rondo	0:43
9.	"Puerto Rico" (with Lucky Daye)	Mills; Eden Ahbez; David Brown; Cooper; LaShawn Daniels; Fred Jerkins III; Rodney Jerkins; Kelly Price; Tobias Breuer; Tyron Douglas	IDK; Rascal; Blue Rondo^{[c]}; Buddah Blessed^{[c]}	3:17
10.	"Temporary Love" (with Sir)	Mills; Sir Darryl Farris; Cooper	IDK; Blue Rondo^{[c]}	1:07
11.	"10 Feet" (with T-Pain)	Mills; Faheem Najm; DeNesha Bowser; Thomas; Cory Washington; Acyde Odunlami; Nwadije; Nnamdi Boardman; Renetta Lowe; Gamlam	IDK; Acyde; Nwadije^{[c]}; Efosa Beloved^{[c]}; Travagant^{[c]}; Blue Rondo^{[a]}	2:58
12.	"Keto" (with the Neptunes, Swae Lee, and Rico Nasty)	Mills; Khalif Brown; Maria-Cecilia Kelly; Keith Martin; Pharrell Williams; Chad Hugo	The Neptunes	2:21
13.	"1995"	Mills; Martin; John Muller; Gamlam; Douglas	IDK; Stonegroov; Blue Rondo^{[a]}; Buddah Blessed^{[a]}	4:08
14.	"Peloton"	Mills; Khalil Abdul-Rahman; Thomas Bell; Kenny Gamble; Nwadije; Alex Petit Sr.; Kiowa Roukema	IDK; CashMoneyAP; YoungKio^{[c]}; DJ Khalil^{[c]}; Nwadije^{[c]}	3:33
15.	"Hey Auntie" (with Slick Rick)	Mills; Richard Walters; Lawrence Greenidge; Gerald Lee; Theo Rosenthal; Gamlam; Eden Eliah Nagar	IDK; LDG Beats; Teddy Roxpin; Blue Rondo^{[c]}; Nagar^{[a]}	3:22
16.	"Cry in Church" (with Sevyn Streeter)	Mills; Amber Streeter; Breuer; Gamlam; Earl Simmons	IDK; Rascal; Blue Rondo^{[a]}	4:47
17.	"Closure"	Mills	IDK	1:34
Total length:				43:51

USee4Yourself – Deluxe edition
No.	Title	Writer(s)	Producer(s)	Length
18.	"Dinner Date" (featuring Trippie Redd)	Mills; Denzel Baptiste; David Biral; Michael White IV	Take a Daytrip; Westen Weiss; IDK^{[c]}; Blue Rondo^{[a]}	2:46
19.	"Temporary Love" (featuring Sir; extended version)	Mills; Farris	D Smoke; D.K. the Punisher; IDK^{[c]}; Blue Rondo^{[a]}	4:16
20.	"Puerto Rico" (featuring Jvck James; version 2)	Mills; James Anderson	IDK; Rascal; Blue Rondo^{[c]}; Buddah Blessed^{[c]}	3:18
21.	"2 Cents" (featuring Shy Glizzy; extended version)	Mills; Marquis King	IDK; Rascal	2:24
22.	"Just Like Martin"	Mills	IDK; ChaseTheMoney	2:33
23.	"King Alfred Plan" (featuring Lil Yachty)	Mills; Gamlam; Gil Scott-Heron; Taji Jones; Miles McCollum	IDK; Tane Runo; Blue Rondo^{[a]}	2:37
24.	"Cereal" (featuring JID and Kenny Mason)	Mills; Jackson Card; Gamlam; Edwin Green Jr.; Gabriel Guerra; Destin Route; John Welch III	Christo; DJ Scheme; Jay Card; IDK^{[c]}; Blue Rondo^{[a]}	3:19
25.	"Rain" (SWV cover)	Brian Alexander Morgan	IDK; Nagar	3:46
26.	"Dogs Don't Lie" (featuring Royce da 5′9″; extended version)	Mills; Aronow; Brotter; Gamlam; Gilad; McKenzie; Ryan Montgomery; Natche; Ramani	DJ Dahi; McKenzie; IDK^{[c]}; Blue Rondo^{[a]}	2:57
Total length:				70:50

Notes

- ^{^[c]} signifies a co-producer.
- ^{^[a]} signifies an additional producer.
- The Complete Edition features instrumentals of all standard edition tracks.
- "3018091821" contains a sample of "Body Song", written by Benjamin Cooper and performed by Panares.
- "Dogs Don't Lie" contains a sample of "Cracking", written by Brian Aronow, Jesse Brotter, Jonathan Gilad, and Caroline Ramani, and performed by Crumb.
- "Red" contains a sample of "Hier Aujourd'hui Demain" written and performed by Michel Ripoche and Phillipe Briche; and interpolations of "Still Fly", written by Byron Thomas and Bryan Williams, and performed by Big Tymers.
- "Puerto Rico" contains a sample of "Nature Boy", written by Eden Ahbez, as performed by the Singers Unlimited, and an interpolation of "Can't Get Enough", written by LaShawn Daniels, Fred Jerkins III, Rodney Jerkins, and Kelly Price, and performed by Tamia.
- "10 Feet" contains a sample of "Monkey on the D$ck", written by Renetta Lowe and Byron Thomas, and performed by Magnolia Shorty.
- "Peloton" contains a sample of "Payback Is a Dog", written by Thomas Bell and Kenneth Gamble, and performed by the Stylistics.
- "Hey Auntie" contains a sample of "Love Theme" from the Black Shampoo soundtrack, written and performed by Gerald Lee.
- "Cry in Church" contains a sample of "The Prayer IV", written and performed by DMX.

== Personnel ==
Musicians

- IDK – vocals (all tracks), programming (tracks 18, 25, 26)
- Aishah White – additional vocals (tracks 1, 17)
- Andrew Schulz – additional vocals (track 1)
- Javonté – additional vocals (track 1)
- Eden Eliah Nagar – drum programming (track 2)
- Mike Tyson – additional vocals (track 3)
- Acyde – additional vocals (track 8)
- DJ Honey – additional vocals (track 8)
- Jet Luna – additional vocals (track 8)
- Blue Rondo – additional vocals (track 10), programming (19, 25, 26)
- Jason Brown – additional vocals (track 10)
- Mother Marygold – additional vocals (track 11)
- City Rominiecki – additional vocals (tracks 12, 13)
- DMX – additional vocals (track 16)

Technical

- Calin Enache – mixing (tracks 1–4, 6, 10, 11, 14–17), mastering (17), engineering (2, 3, 9, 11, 14, 15)
- Josh Gudwin – mixing (track 2)
- Mike Dean – mixing (tracks 4, 5, 7, 9, 11–13), mastering (all tracks)
- Eden Eliah Nagar – mixing (tracks 8), engineering (all tracks), mixing assistance (1–7, 9–17)
- Vic Wainstein – engineering (tracks 2, 5, 9, 11, 13, 15)
- Chaz Sexton – engineering (tracks 9–11, 15)
- Kouroush "MyBoyRoach" Poursalehi – engineering (track 9)
- Mike Larson – engineering (track 12)
- Kahlil Vellani – engineering (tracks 14)
- Kai Lasker – engineering (track 14)
- Bernard "Bezo" Chavez II – engineering for Sevyn Streeter (track 16)
