= IDK (rapper) =

American rapper (born 1992)

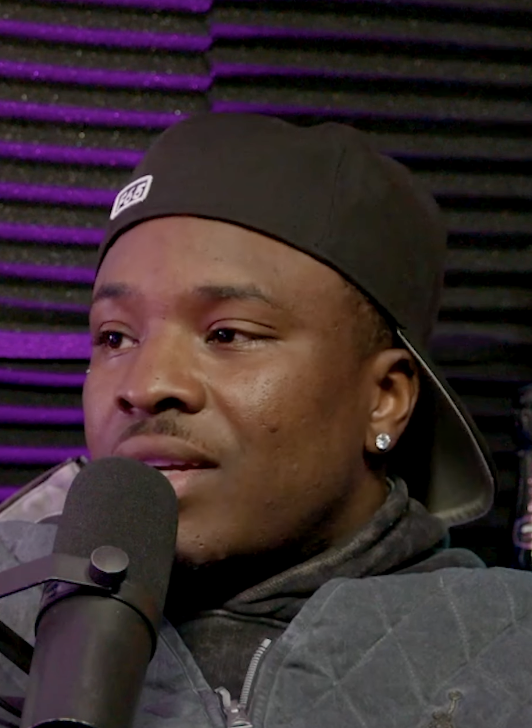
- IDK in May 2023

Background information
- Also known as: .idk.; Ignorantly Delivering Knowledge; Jay IDK
- Born: Jason Aaron Mills; May 24, 1992 (age 34); London, England
- Origin: Prince George's County, Maryland, U.S.
- Genres: Hip-hop; trap; jazz
- Occupations: Rapper; singer; songwriter; record producer
- Years active: 2012–present
- Labels: Shady; Interscope; HXLY TRiBE; Warner; Clue No Clue

Jason Aaron Mills (born May 24, 1992), known professionally as IDK (stylized as .idk.), also known as Jay IDK (a backronym for Ignorantly Delivering Knowledge), is a British-American rapper, singer, songwriter and record producer.

== Early life ==
Jason Aaron Mills was born in May of 1992 in London to parents of Sierra Leonean and Ghanaian descent. He was raised in Prince George's County, Maryland, where he later started to make music initially under the moniker "Jay IDK". He describes his upbringing as middle class, despite attending a high school in a lower income school district in Maryland. He later changed his artist name to IDK after being sentenced to prison in 2010.

== Career ==
=== Music ===
In August 2015, Mills released his second mixtape, titled SubTrap. The name stands for Suburban Trap or "trap music with substance". The album features the singles "The Plug," "God Said Trap (King Trappy III)", and "Cookie Addiction" featuring BJ the Chicago Kid. It features production from Skhye Hutch, was mixed by Lo Mein, Tim Webberson, Matt Weiss, and Delbert Bowers. Project management for SubTrap was overseen by Blade Thornton, David Kuti, Clayton Barmore, Quinelle Holder, and Ryan Booth. Mills' style of rapping has been compared to the early work of Kendrick Lamar, especially Lamar's 2011 album Section.80.

On October 13, 2017, Mills released his fourth mixtape IWasVeryBad, which was released for free in collaboration with Adult Swim. Mills later released the first six songs of the album as a series on Noisey. This series gave the album visuals, and a new story. The first six songs were part of the first season, with the second season going unreleased, which assumingly would've included the last six songs.

On November 9, 2018, Mills released his first EP IDK & Friends :).

On September 4, 2019, Mills released his debut studio album, Is He Real, including features from Pusha T, DMX, JID, Tyler, the Creator, Burna Boy, and GLC.

On June 26, 2020, Mills released his second EP IDK & Friends 2, which was used as the soundtrack for Kevin Durant's Basketball County documentary.

On July 9, 2021, Mills released his second studio album, USee4Yourself, including features from Young Thug, Offset, Westside Gunn, MF Doom, Jay Electronica, Lucky Daye, SiR, T-Pain, The Neptunes, Swae Lee, Rico Nasty, Slick Rick, Sevyn Streeter, and more.

On May 6, 2022, Mills released his third studio album, Simple., which included features from Denzel Curry and Mike Dimes, and was executively produced by Kaytranada. Mills met Kaytranada at a party, and subsequently began collaborating with him regularly, including again in 2025.

On May 5, 2023, Mills released his fourth studio album, F65, including features from Fat Trel, NLE Choppa, Jucee Froot, Saucy Santana, Tay Iwar, Musiq Soulchild, Rich The Kid, Snoop Dogg and Benny the Butcher.

On January 23, 2026, he released his fifth mixtape, E.T.D.S. under Rhymesayers Entertainment, which received critical acclaim. Mills live performed a medley of the tracks "P.O" and "C.O.P", along with Black Thought and Kaytranada, at The Tonight Show Starring Jimmy Fallon on March 5. A music video for "C.O.P", directed by Eric André, was released on April 7, 2026.

The same year, he released the collaborative single "Beyond the Brilliant Haze", with Peter Gabriel and Everything is Recorded, under XL Recordings on June 24, 2026.

On November 13, 2026, IDK released the song "Welcome", which features a hook from Eminem and production from the late J Dilla. On the same date, it was announced that Mills signed to Shady Records and Interscope Records.

=== Philanthropy ===
In 2020, IDK established a music business course, "No Label Academy" hosted annually at Harvard University. The course is designed to support students of color in developing a career in the music industry. The program was designed in partnership with No Label, a non-profit focused on uplifting narratives from underrepresented communities. The course is designed to teach young entrepreneurs in the music industry learn about finance, marketing, negotiations, and business strategy.

=== Live performances ===
On June 24, 2016, Mills was announced as one of the performers at the 2016 Trillectro Music Festival. On September 9, 2016, Mills released his third mixtape Empty Bank and premiered it on Forbes. Mills opened for Isaiah Rashad on his "The Lil Sunny" tour which started in January 2017. On April 29, 2022, Mills opened for Zedd at Washington University in St. Louis as part of WILD. On May 1, 2022, Mills performed at Swarthmore College as part of Worthstock.

== Discography ==
=== Studio albums ===
List of studio albums, with selected details
Title	Album details	Peak chart positions
Title	Album details	US
Is He Real	Released: September 4, 2019; Label: Warner, Clue No Clue; Format: Digital download, streaming, vinyl, CD	—
USee4Yourself	Released: July 9, 2021; Label: Warner, Clue No Clue; Format: Digital download, streaming, vinyl, CD	164
Simple.	Released: May 6, 2022; Label: Warner, Clue No Clue; Format: Digital download, streaming, vinyl, CD	—
F65	Released: May 5, 2023; Label: Warner, Clue No Clue; Format: Digital download, streaming	—
Bravado + Intimo	Released: November 1, 2024; Label: Self-released; Format: Digital download, streaming, vinyl, CD	—

=== EPs ===
List of mixtapes, with selected details
Title	Album details
IDK & Friends :)	Released: November 9, 2018; Label: HXLY TRiBE; Format: Digital download, streaming
IDK & Friends 2 (Basketball County soundtrack)	Released: June 26, 2020; Label: Warner, Clue No Clue; Format: Digital download, streaming

=== Mixtapes ===
List of mixtapes, with selected details
Title	Album details
Sex, Drugs & Homework (as Jay IDK)	Released: May 25, 2014; Label: HXLY TRiBE; Format: Digital download, streaming
SubTrap (as Jay IDK)	Released: August 25, 2015; Label: HXLY TRiBE; Format: Digital download, streaming
Empty Bank (as Jay IDK)	Released: September 9, 2016; Label: HXLY TRiBE; Format: Digital download, streaming
IWasVeryBad	Released: October 13, 2017; Label: Adult Swim; Format: CD, digital download, streaming
E.T.D.S.	Released: January 23, 2026; Label: Broke, Rhymesayers; Format: Digital download, streaming, vinyl, CD

=== Singles ===
Lists of singles, with selected details
Title	Single details
"Blame My Friends (The Gang)"	Released: February 7, 2017; Label: Clue No Clue; Format: Digital download, streaming
"OMW"	Released: April 27, 2017; Label: HXLY TRiBE; Format: Digital download, streaming
"No Wave" (featuring Denzel Curry)	Released: February 16, 2018; Label: HXLY TRiBE; Format: Digital download, streaming
"Lil Arrogant" (featuring Joey Badass and Russ)	Released: March 30, 2018; Label: HXLY TRiBE; Format: Digital download, streaming
"Star"	Released: May 25, 2018; Label: HXLY TRiBE; Format: Digital download, streaming
"Trippie Redd's Freestyle"	Released: June 28, 2018; Label: HXLY TRiBE; Format: Digital download, streaming
"Electric" (featuring Q Da Fool)	Released: September 27, 2018; Label: Clue No Clue; Format: Digital download, streaming
"Trigger Happy"	Released: March 6, 2019; Label: Clue No Clue; Format: Digital download, streaming
"In My White Tee"	Released: April 10, 2020; Label: Warner, Clue No Clue; Format: Digital download, streaming
"Coal"	Released: November 26, 2021; Label: Warner, Clue No Clue; Format: Digital download, streaming; Released as an Apple Music exclusive for Carols Covered 2021. Mills later rereleased the song on other platforms on December 1, 2022.
"W13"	Released: August 26, 2022; Label: Warner, Clue No Clue; Format: Digital download, streaming
"Monsieur Dior"	Released: October 28, 2022; Label: Warner, Clue No Clue; Format: Digital download, streaming
"Denim" (featuring Joey Badass)	Released: March 28, 2024; Label: Warner, Clue No Clue; Format: Digital download, streaming
"Tiffany" (featuring Gunna)	Released: June 21, 2024; Label: Warner, Clue No Clue; Format: Digital download, streaming
"Clover" (featuring Joey Valence & Brae)	Released: May 21, 2025; Label: Self-released; Format: Digital download, streaming
"Start to Finish – S.T.F" (featuring DMX)	Released: October 15, 2025; Label: Self-released; Format: Digital download, streaming
"Scary Merri"	Released: November 14, 2025; Label: Self-released; Format: Digital download, streaming
"Life 4 a Life" (featuring Pusha T)	Released: January 9, 2026; Label: Self-released; Format: Digital download, streaming
"Beyond the Brilliant Haze" (with Everything is Recorded and Peter Gabriel)	Released: June 24, 2026; Label: XL; Format: Digital download, streaming
"Welcome" (featuring Eminem)	Released: November 13, 2026; Label: Shady, Interscope, Clue No Clue; Format: Digital download, streaming

=== Guest appearances ===
List of guest appearances, with other performing artists, showing year released and album name
Title	Year	Artist(s)	Album
"Kristi YamaGucci"	2018	ASAP Ferg, Denzel Curry, NickNack	—N/a
"Uh Huh"	2018	Denzel Curry	—N/a
"I Don't Sell Dope"	2018	Lil Gnar	GNAR Lif3
"No Time"	2018	Party Thieves	—N/a
"Beautiful Smile"	2018	Saba	—N/a
"And You"	2018	Token, Bas	Between Somewhere
"Beautiful Oblivion"	2018	The Neighbourhood	Hard to Imagine the Neighbourhood Ever Changing
"Minimizya"	2019	City Morgue	City Morgue Vol 2: As Good as Dead
"Al Pacino"	2020	Izi	Riot
"Burnin Bridges / Long Day"	2021	Quadeca	From Me to You
"FREE SMOKE"	2021	Jerm	Ultraviolet
"Uber Music"	2021	Diz Live, Bino Rideaux	Uber Music
"Trials"	2022	Nghtmre	Drmvrse
"Psychedelic Views"	2022	Sad Night Dynamite	Volume II
