= F65 (album) =

Studio album by IDK
- Released: May 5, 2023
- Genres: Hip-hop; jazz
- Length: 52:52
- Labels: Clue No Clue; Warner
- Producers: IDK; Acyde; Agajon; Angelo Arce; Beat Butcha; Blwyrmnd; CashMoneyAP; Daoud; Efosa Beloved; Kevin Ekofo; Kel P; Jim Lang; LastHaze; LNK; Rodaidh McDonald; Mia Wallis; Obi Nwadije; Rascal; SB Paolo; Stonegroov; Wallis Lane

IDK chronology
Simple (2022)	F65 (2023)	Bravado + Intimo (2024)

Singles from F65
- 1. "Radioactive" Released: February 17, 2023; 2. "850 (We on Top)" Released: March 24, 2023; 3. "Mr. Police" Released: April 20, 2023; 4. "Salty" Released: May 1, 2023

F65 ratings
Review scores
Source	Rating
ByteFM	7.0
Legends Will Never Die	3/5
HipHopDX	3.7/5
The Observer	3/5 stars

F65 is the fourth studio album by American rapper IDK. It was released on May 5, 2023, through his Clue No Clue label and Warner Records. Primarily a hip-hop record with influences of jazz music, it features collaborations with Fat Trel, NLE Choppa, Jucee Froot, Saucy Santana, Tay Iwar, Musiq Soulchild, Rich the Kid, Snoop Dogg, and Benny the Butcher. Production was primarily handled by IDK himself, alongside collaborators including Blwyrmnd, Rascal, Efosa Beloved, and CashMoneyAP.

== Composition ==
IDK described F65's musical concept as "com[ing] from my love for juxtaposition", stating "the feeling of driving my Mercedes AMG at high speeds to calming jazz music" created a contrast that became the album's "melodic influence": "Every melody was meant to feel like you're speeding to jazz music". He envisioned the album as "a more mature version" of his second mixtape, Subtrap (2015).

== Promotion ==
In promotion of the album, IDK revealed special "Free Coast" colorways for the Nike Air Max 95 and Air Max 97, as well as a custom 59Fifty baseball cap design in collaboration with Lids HD. The design incorporates elements of the flags of Ghana and Sierra Leone, which hold special significance, being his parents' home countries as well as being vital countries in the Atlantic slave trade. This sentiment is also prevalent in the album's composition, as IDK wrote in a press release; "Often times African-Americans are questioned and even ridiculed for not understanding their history [...] 'Free Coast' is a world created to bring awareness to Cape Coast, Ghana (where slaves were taken from West Africa to America) and Freetown, Sierra Leone (where slaves were freed) through combining both flags and their historic components to make one movement". He additionally appeared in a custom Lanvin racing suit (pictured on the cover art) for his performance at Coachella 2023.

The 65 Tour was also announced, starting in Paris, France, on June 23, 2023, and ending in Toronto, Canada, on October 29.

=== Singles ===
"Radioactive" was released on February 17, 2023, as the album's lead single. "850 (We on Top)", which features Rich the Kid, was given a surprise release on March 24. "Mr. Police" was released on April 20, with its music video receiving a premiere on MSNBC's The Beat with Ari Melber. "Salty" featuring NLE Choppa was released five days before the album on May 1, and is the only single not to have an accompanying music video.

== Track listing ==
F65 track listing
No.	Title	Writer(s)	Producer(s)	Length
1.	"Cape Coast"	Jason Mills; Derek Gamlam; Eden Eliah Nagar	IDK	1:19
2.	"Pit Stop"	Mills; Gamlam; Simon Schranz; Paul Beauregard; Ricky Dunigan	IDK; Blwyrmnd	1:58
3.	"Thug Tear" (with Fat Trel)	Mills; Gamlam; Nagar; Cory Washington; Daoud Anthony; Kingsley Nwadije; Nnamdi Boardman; Rodaidh McDonald	IDK; Efosa Beloved; Obi Nwadije; Daoud; McDonald; Travagant^{[a]}	2:58
4.	"Champs-Élysées"	Mills; Gamlam; Jim Lang	IDK; Lang	1:30
5.	"Salty" (featuring NLE Choppa)	Mills; Nagar; Schranz; Bryson Potts	IDK; Blwyrmnd	1:45
6.	"D.S.T.P"	Mills; Gamlam; Lang	IDK; Lang	0:51
7.	"Mr. Police"	Mills; Nagar; Lang	IDK; Lang	2:52
8.	"Pinot Noir" (with Jucee Froot and Saucy Santana)	Mills; Alex Petit; Rashad Spain; Terrica Alexander; Atia Boggs; Michael Williams; Khia Chambers; Edward Merriwether; William Robinson; Rose Etta James	IDK; CashMoneyAP; Calvin Valentine^{[a]}	2:55
9.	"Paperchaser"	Mills; Byron Thomas; Terius Gray	Rascal; Agajon	2:14
10.	"Elmina" (with Tay Iwar)	Mills; Gamlam; Austin Iwart; Kevin Ekofo; Tobias Breuer; Udoma Amba	Rascal; Ekofo; Kel P; IDK^{[c]}	2:40
11.	"Georgetown"	Mills; Nagar; Angelo Arce; John Muller; Laraya Robinson; Nima Jahanbin; Paimon Jahanbin	Wallis Lane; Stonegroov; Mia Wallis; Arce; IDK^{[c]}	1:23
12.	"Radioactive"	Mills; Nagar; Schranz; Erik Ruppel; Leon Kroll; Stacy White	Blwyrmnd; LNK; LastHaze; DJ Sliink^{[a]}; IDK^{[c]}	3:04
13.	"Know Interlude" (with Musiq Soulchild)	Mills; Nagar; Breuer; Eliot Dubock	Rascal; Beat Butcha; Blue Rondo^{[a]}; IDK^{[c]}	0:39
14.	"Télé Couleur"	Mills; Boardman; Nagar; Yoko Kanno; Carla Vallet	Efosa Beloved; IDK^{[c]}	2:23
15.	"Rabbit Stew"	Mills; Anthony; McDonald; Breuer; Muller; Moki Kawaguchi; Clifford Price; Acyde Odunlami	IDK; McDonald; Daoud; Acyde; Goldie^{[c]}; Submotive^{[c]}; Theatre of Cruelty^{[c]}	3:35
16.	"850 (We on Top)" (featuring Rich the Kid)	Mills; Gamlam; Nagar; Schranz; SB Paolo; Dimitri Roger	Blwyrmnd; SB Paolo; IDK^{[c]}	3:39
17.	"Middle Passage" (featuring Snoop Dogg)	Mills; Calvin Broadus; Nagar	IDK	0:21
18.	"Still Your Man"	Mills; Gamlam; Nagar; Michael Flowers	IDK; Blue Rondo^{[a]}	1:25
19.	"St. Nicholas & 118th"	Mills; Nagar	IDK	0:44
20.	"Up the Score" (featuring Benny the Butcher)	Mills; Breuer; Jeremie Pennick; Anthony Camillo; Mary Jane Sawyer	Rascal	2:44
21.	"Superwoman" (Stevie Wonder cover; with Musiq Soulchild)	Stevie Wonder	IDK; Blue Rondo^{[c]}	7:17
22.	"Freetown"	Mills; Gamlam; Nagar	IDK	4:26
Total length:				52:52

=== Notes ===
- ^{^[a]} indicates an additional producer
- ^{^[c]} indicates a co-producer

==== Sample credits ====
- "Pit Stop" contains an interpolation of "Back Against da Wall", written by Paul Beauregard, and performed by Three 6 Mafia.
- "Pinot Noir" contains samples from:
  - "My Neck, My Back (Lick It)", written by Khia Chambers and Edward Merriwether, and performed by Khia;
  - "A Quiet Storm", written by Smokey Robinson and Rose Etta James, as performed by Robinson;
  - "I Can't Help It", written by Stevie Wonder and Susaye Greene, and performed by Michael Jackson (uncredited).
- "Paperchaser" contains an interpolation of "Ha", written by Terius Gray and Byron Thomas, and performed by Juvenile.
- "Télé Couleur" contains a sample of "Fantaisie Sign", written by Yoko Kanno and Carla Vallet, as performed by Vallet.
- "Still Your Man" contains a sample of "I Wish", written by Carl Thomas and Michael Flowers, and performed by Thomas.
- "Up the Score" contains a sample of "Stay with Me", written by Anthony Camillo and Mary Jane Sawyer, as performed by the Cecil Holmes Soulful Sounds and Tony Camillo.

== Personnel ==
Credits adapted from Tidal.

=== Vocalists ===
- IDK – lead vocals
- Fat Trel – vocals (track 3)
- NLE Choppa – featured artist, vocals (track 5)
- Jucee Froot – vocals (track 8)
- Saucy Santana – vocals (track 8)
- Tay Iwar – vocals (track 10)
- Musiq Soulchild– vocals (tracks 13, 21), additional vocals (track 1)
- Rich the Kid – featured artist, vocals (track 16)
- Snoop Dogg – featured artist (track 17)
- Benny the Butcher – featured artist, vocals (track 20)
- David Croft – additional vocals (tracks 1, 19, 21, 22)
- Tish Hyman – additional vocals (tracks 3, 21)
- Lil Boosie – additional vocals (track 6)
- Ink – additional vocals (track 8)
- DeAngelo Sneed – additional vocals (track 11)

=== Musicians ===
- Dominique Sanders – bass (tracks 1, 22)
- Moyes Lucas – drums (tracks 1, 21)
- Blue Rondo – keyboards (tracks 1, 3–6, 8, 10, 15, 16, 21, 22), additional piano (track 2)
- Ethan Wollman – keyboards (tracks 1, 7, 21)
- Andrew Torgelson – saxophone (tracks 1, 4, 5, 16, 22), flute (tracks 4, 5, 16, 22)
- IDK – piano (track 2), bass (track 14)
- Caleb Buchanan – bass (tracks 3, 8, 15, 17, 18)
- Dario Bizio – bass (tracks 4, 6, 7)
- Dan Seeff – bass (tracks 5, 16)
- Fabian Chavez – flute (tracks 6, 7)
- Jayme Silverstein – bass (tracks 10, 21)
- Moki Kawaguchi – keyboards (track 15)
- Jake Reed – percussion (track 16), drums (track 22)
- Efosa Beloved – programming (track 18)
- Paul Cornish – keyboards (track 22)

=== Technical ===
- IDK – arranger
- Nicolas de Porcel – masterer
- Calin Enache – mixer (all tracks), recording engineer (track 1, 7)
- Eden Eliah Nagar – recording engineer, assistant mixer
- Wil Anspach – recording engineer (tracks 1–4, 6–16, 20–22)
- John Muller – recording engineer (track 5)
- Edwin Gonzalez – recording engineer (track 15)
- Demitrius Lewis II – assistant masterer (track 12)
- Nic Wheeler – assistant mixer
