= Ronee Blakley =

American actress and singer-songwriter (born 1945)

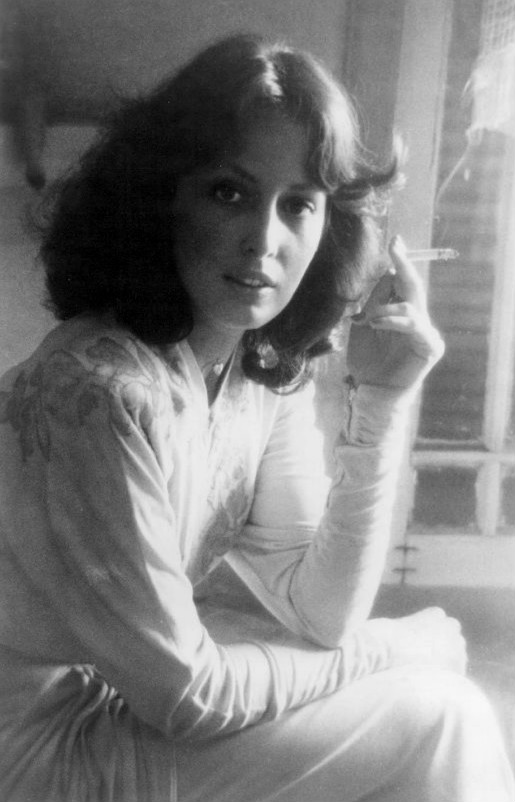
- Blakley in 1976
- Born: Ronnie Sue Blakley; August 24, 1945 (age 81); Nampa, Idaho, U.S.
- Occupations: Actress; singer; songwriter; composer; producer; director
- Years active: 1970–present
- Website: roneeblakley.com

Ronee Sue Blakley (born August 24, 1945) is an American actress, singer-songwriter, composer, producer and director.

She is perhaps best known for her role as the fictional country superstar Barbara Jean in Robert Altman's Nashville (1975), for which she won a National Board of Review Award for Best Supporting Actress and was nominated for an Academy Award. She also appeared in Walter Hill's The Driver (1978) and Wes Craven's A Nightmare on Elm Street (1984).

== Life and career ==
Blakley was born in Nampa, Idaho, one of four children born to Ronald Blakley, a civil engineer, and his wife Carol (née Brown), who became a gay rights activist in support of Blakley's brother, Stephen. In addition to Stephen, Blakley has a brother John and a sister Marthetta.

=== 1970s ===
Blakley released her self-titled debut album on Elektra Records in 1972. The album featured Blakley's original songs, self-accompanied on piano. Blakley also made the musical arrangements. The song "Bluebird" featured a duet with Linda Ronstadt. Blakley's songs were published by her own company, Sawtooth Music.

Her second album, Welcome—produced by Jerry Wexler and recorded at Muscle Shoals Sound Studio in Alabama—was released on Warner Bros. in 1975.

That same year, Blakley appeared in what may be her most widely known performance in Nashville. Her character, Barbara Jean, looked similar to country star Loretta Lynn, though Blakley stated that the character was based on Lynn Anderson. Blakley performed her own songs in character, including "Tapedeck In His Tractor," "Dues" and "My Idaho Home." In her review for The New Yorker, film critic Pauline Kael wrote:

This is Ronee Blakley's first movie, and she puts most movie hysteria to shame. She achieves her gifts so simply, I wasn't surprised when somebody sitting beside me started to cry. Perhaps, for the first time on the screen, one gets the sense of an artist being destroyed by her gifts.

Blakley's performance in Nashville was nominated for an Academy Award for Best Supporting Actress, Golden Globe Award for Best Supporting Actress – Motion Picture and for Best Acting Debut in a Motion Picture (Female), BAFTA Award for Best Actress in a Supporting Role and the Grammy Award for Album of Best Original Score Written for a Motion Picture or Television Special, and won the National Board of Review award for Best Supporting Actress. She was featured on the covers of Newsweek, American Cinematographer and Interview magazines.

She toured in Bob Dylan's traveling Rolling Thunder Revue, singing a set of solo original songs accompanying herself on piano. She also sang with Dylan and other headlining musicians on the tour, released on The Bootleg Series Vol. 5: Bob Dylan Live 1975, The Rolling Thunder Revue. She recorded backup vocals on "Hurricane" on Dylan's album Desire. Blakley has also recorded with Leonard Cohen and Hoyt Axton.

Blakley starred in the 1977 film She Came to the Valley. She also appeared in several TV movies including Desperate Women, Ladies in Waiting, Oklahoma City Dolls and the Ford 75th Anniversary Special presentation of The Glass Menagerie. Her guest starring roles in television series include Vega$, The Love Boat, Highway to Heaven, Trapper John, Hotel, The Runaways, Beyond Westworld and Tales from the Darkside.

=== 1980s ===
Blakley starred in The Baltimore Bullet in 1980. She appeared on Broadway in 1982's Pump Boys and Dinettes and starred in Rain for the Indiana Repertory Theatre. Blakley played the role of Marge Thompson in the 1984 horror film A Nightmare on Elm Street.

She wrote, produced, directed and starred in her own feature music docudrama, I Played It for You, in 1985. The movie debuted at the Venice Film Festival and was screened at several other film festivals around the world. Sheila Benson of the Los Angeles Times called it "passionate and brave, an absorbing work." FX Feeney of LA Weekly called it "a valuable document." The film was released on DVD in 2008, bundled with the soundtrack on CD and a new spoken word poetry album titled Freespeak.

=== Personal life and recent activity ===
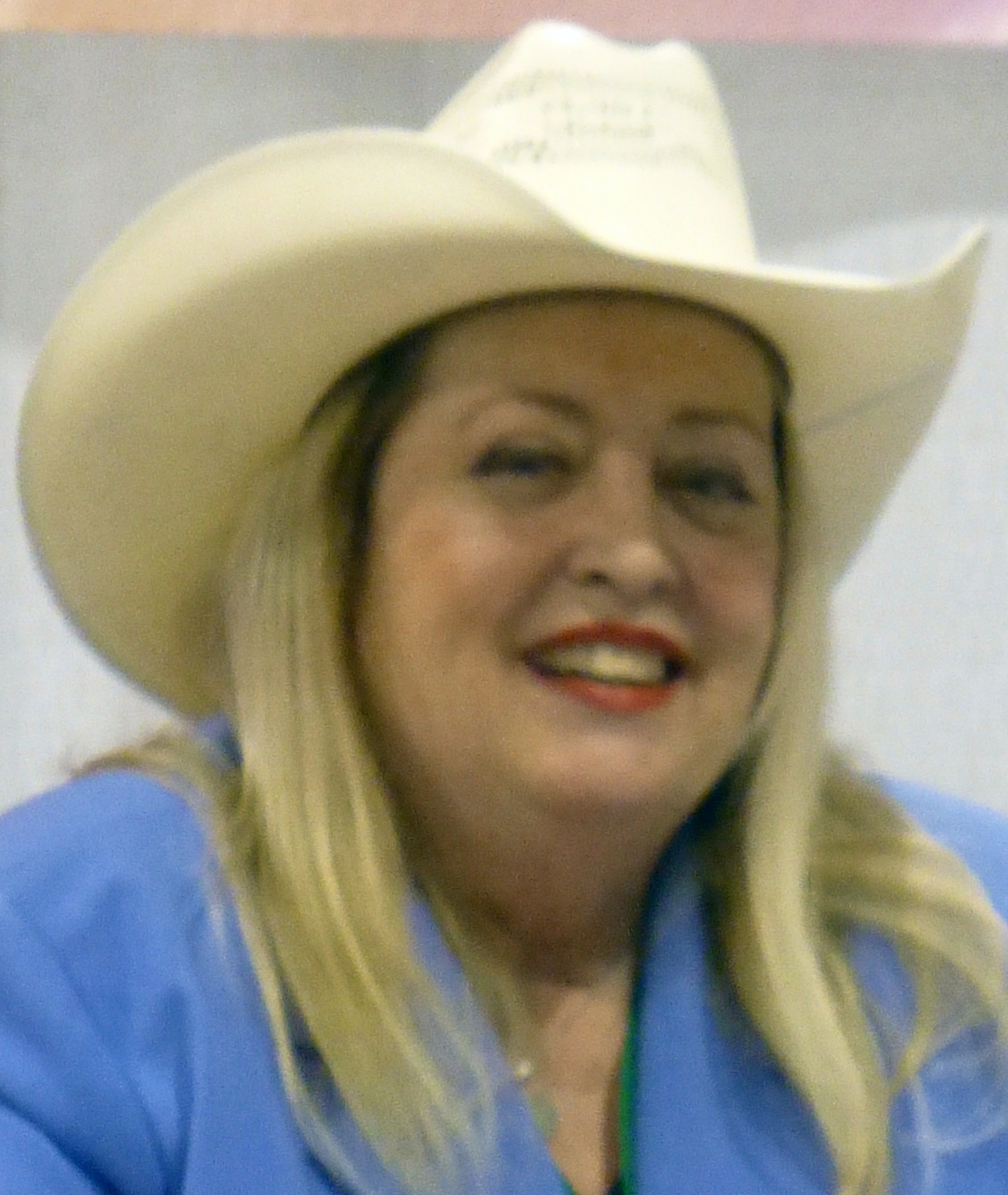
Blakley in 2015

Throughout her career, Blakley has performed on behalf of several political and social causes, with an emphasis on civil rights and equal rights for women.

Her 2009 album, River Nile, was inspired by a trip she made to Egypt. In October 2010, she appeared on stage at New York's Bitter End for the first time in 20 years. She wrote, produced and directed the 2012 film Of One Blood, her first foray into films in over 20 years. Her daughter appeared with her in the film. She was featured in the pseudodocumentary Rolling Thunder Revue: A Bob Dylan Story by Martin Scorsese (2019).

== Works ==
=== Discography ===
- Ronee Blakley (1972) – Elektra (re-released by Collector's Choice, 2006)
- Nashville Soundtrack – MCA
- Welcome (1975) – Warner Bros. (re-released by Collector's Choice, 2006)
- The Bootleg Series Vol. 5: Bob Dylan Live 1975, The Rolling Thunder Revue (2002) – Columbia
- I Played It for You (2007) – RBPI (CDBaby.com)
- Freespeak (2008 – RBPI (CDBaby.com)
- Lightning Over Water Soundtrack (2008) – RBPI (CDBaby.com)
- Ronee Blakley Live at the Mint (2008) – RBPI
- River Nile (2009) – RBPI
- Grief Holes (2009) – RBPI
- Live at the Bitter End (2011) – RBPI
- Djerassi Collection (2012) – RBPI
- Bob Dylan – The Rolling Thunder Revue: The 1975 Live Recordings (2019) – Columbia
- Atom Bomb Baby (2020) – RBPI

=== Film ===
| Year | Title | Role | Notes |
|---|---|---|---|
| 1970 | Wilbur and the Baby Factory | Folksinger | |
| 1975 | Nashville | Barbara Jean | |
| 1977 | Three Dangerous Ladies | Simone Maglore | Segment "The Mannikin" |
| 1977 | The Private Files of J. Edgar Hoover | Carrie DeWitt | |
| 1978 | Renaldo and Clara | Mrs. Dylan | |
| 1978 | The Driver | The Connection | |
| 1979 | She Came to the Valley | Willy Westall | |
| 1979 | Good Luck, Miss Wyckoff | Betsy | |
| 1980 | The Baltimore Bullet | Carolina Red | |
| 1980 | Lightning Over Water | Herself | Documentary |
| 1984 | A Nightmare on Elm Street | Marge Thompson | |
| 1985 | Cinématon | Herself | |
| 1987 | A Return to Salem's Lot | Sally | |
| 1987 | Student Confidential | Jenny Selden | |
| 1987 | Someone to Love | Attendee | |
| 1990 | Murder by Numbers | Faith | |
| 2019 | Rolling Thunder Revue: A Bob Dylan Story by Martin Scorsese | The Ingénue | |

=== Television ===
- Desperate Women (1978)
- Vega$ (1 episode, 1978) : Second Stanza (1978)
- Ladies in Waiting (1979)
- The Love Boat (1 episode, 1979) : Doc's Ex' Change/Gift, The/Making the Grade (1979)
- Beyond Westworld (1 episode, 1980) : Sound of Terror (1980)
- The Oklahoma City Dolls (1981)
- Highway to Heaven (1 episode, 1984) : Song of the Wild West (1984)
- Trapper John, M.D. (1 episode, 1985) : So Little, Gone (1985)
- Tales from the Darkside (1 episode, 1985) : The False Prophet (1985)
- ABC Afterschool Special Sherman (1 episode, 1987) : Divorced Kids' Blues (1987)
- Hotel (1 episode, 1988) : Double Take (1988) TV episode

=== Composer ===
- Welcome Home, Soldier Boys (1971)
- Nashville (1975)
- Lightning Over Water (1980)
- Docu Drama (1984)

=== Soundtracks ===
- Nashville (1975) (writer: "Bluebird", "Tapedeck in His Tractor", "Dues", "My Idaho Home") (music: "Down to the River") (lyrics: "Down to the River") (performer: "Tapedeck in His Tractor", "Dues", "My Idaho Home", "One, I Love You", "Down to the River")
- Renaldo and Clara (1978) (writer: "Need a New Sun Rising") (performer: "Need a New Sun Rising")

=== Director, writer & producer ===
- Docu Drama (1984)
- Of One Blood (2012)

== Awards and nominations ==
| Year | Award | Category | Nominated work | Result |
|---|---|---|---|---|
| 1976 | Academy Awards | Best Supporting Actress | Nashville | Nominated |
| 1976 | BAFTA Awards | Best Supporting Actress | Nashville | Nominated |
| 1976 | Golden Globe Awards | Best Supporting Actress | Nashville | Nominated |
| 1976 | Golden Globe Awards | Best Acting Debut in a Motion Picture - Female | Nashville | Nominated |
| 1976 | Grammy Awards | Best Album of Best Original Score Written for a Motion Picture or a Television Special | Nashville | Nominated |
| 1976 | National Board of Review | Best Supporting Actress | Nashville | Won |
