= Unwelcome =

Unwelcome may refer to:

- Unwelcome (album), 2013 album by Arsis
- Unwelcome (film), 2023 folk horror film

== See also ==
- Welcome (disambiguation)
