= IWasVeryBad =

Mixtape by IDK
- Released: October 13, 2017
- Recorded: 2017
- Studio: HXLY Sound Studios & OHM House, Woodland Hills, California
- Genre: Hip hop
- Length: 35:07
- Label: Adult Swim
- Producer: Kal Banx; Lo-Fi; Daniel Worthy; Tae Beast; BLWYRMND; Nate Fox; Blue Rondo; BigKiddMusic; Arielle Graham; J-Rich; Thelonious.Martin; Razjah; Alexander Spit; Edsclusive; Soul Surplus

IDK chronology
Empty Bank (2016)	IWasVeryBad (2017)

Singles from IWasVeryBad
- 1. "Baby Scale" Released: August 30, 2017; 2. "17 Wit a 38" Released: October 12, 2017

IWasVeryBad is the fourth mixtape and a short film by American rapper IDK. It was released in full on October 13, 2017, through Adult Swim. The album features Swizz Beatz, Yung Gleesh, MF Doom, Del the Funky Homosapien, Mother Marygold, and Chief Keef as guest performers, and was recorded throughout 2017. The music was released through Adult Swim as an episodic series, with three tracks released September 29 and October 6, the two Fridays before October 13.

In the 35-minute short film, IDK reenacts the events that led to his arrest and imprisonment at the age of 17.

== Critical reception ==
A review published by Vice referred to IWasVeryBad as IDK's "most introspective release since his first mixtape in 2014", arguing that "the most poignant parts" were about how he grieves his mother's death" in a manner that is "remorseful yet unrepentant".

== Track listing ==
IWasVeryBad track listing
No.	Title	Writer(s)	Producer(s)	Length
1.	"Mrs. Lynch, Your Son Is the Devil"	Jason Mills	Kal Banx	3:00
2.	"Maryland Ass Nigga" (featuring Swizz Beatz)	Mills; Kaseem Dean	Kal Banx	2:57
3.	"Pizza Shop Extended" (featuring Yung Gleesh, MF Doom and Del the Funky Homosapien)	Mills; Asa Asuncion; Daniel Dumile; Teren Jones	BLWYRMND; BigKiddMusic	4:04
4.	"Dog Love Kitty" (featuring Mother Marygold)	Mills	Kal Banx	2:00
5.	"Mama Said "Respect the Venus Symbol" I Didn't Listen"	Mills		0:27
6.	"Windows Up"	Mills	Tae Beast	2:13
7.	"Bird & the Bees"	Mills	Lo-Fi	3:40
8.	"17 Wit a 38" (featuring Chief Keef)	Mills; Keith Cozart	Daniel Worthy	2:41
9.	"No Shoes on the Rug, Leave Them at the Door"	Mills	Kal Banx	3:34
10.	"No Words"	Mills	Kal Banx	2:00
11.	"Black Sheep, White Dove"	Mills	Thelonious.Martin; Lo-Fi	4:59
12.	"Baby Scale" (featuring Yung Gleesh)	Mills; Asuncion	Razjah; Alexander Spit	3:32
Total length:				35:07
