= USS Betty M. II =

Patrol vessel of the United States Navy

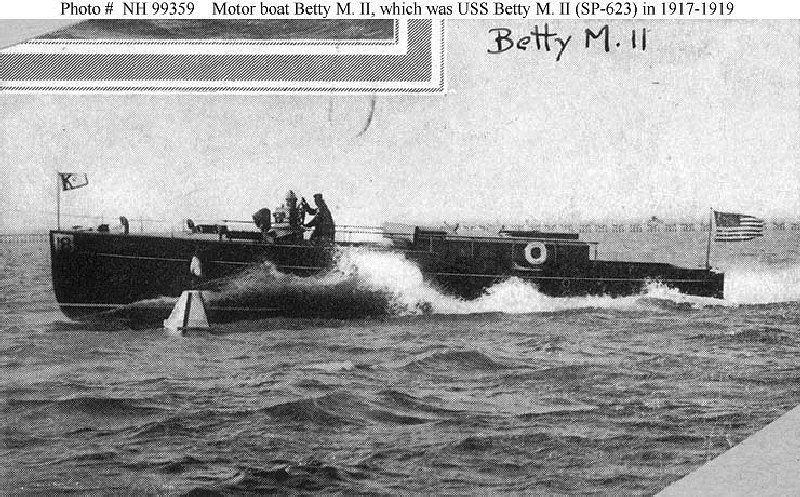
- Betty M. II as a private motorboat sometime in 1916 or the early months of 1917.

History

United States
- Name: USS Betty M. II
- Namesake: Previous name retained
- Builder: Church Boat Company, Sibley, Michigan
- Completed: 1916
- Acquired: 1917
- Commissioned: 4 September 1917
- Decommissioned: 25 November 1918
- Fate: Returned to owner 17 March 1919
- Notes: Operated as private motorboat Betty M. II 1916-1917 and from 1919

General characteristics
- Type: Patrol vessel
- Tonnage: 19 gross register tons
- Length: 60 ft (18 m)
- Beam: 10 ft (3.0 m)
- Draft: 2 ft 9 in (0.84 m) aft
- Speed: 25 knots
- Complement: 6
- Armament: 1 × 3-pounder gun; 2 × machine guns

USS Betty M. II (SP-623) was a United States Navy patrol vessel in commission from 1917 to 1918.

Betty M. II was built as a private motorboat of the same name by the Church Boat Company at Sibley, Michigan, in 1916. In 1917, the U.S. Navy acquired her under a free lease from her owner, Charles W. Kotcher of Detroit, Michigan, for use as a section patrol boat during World War I. She was commissioned at Detroit as USS Betty M. II (SP-623) on 4 September 1917.

Assigned to the 9th, 10th, and 11th Naval Districts – a single administrative entity created by the amalgamation of the 9th Naval District, 10th Naval District, and 11th Naval District – on the Great Lakes, Betty M. II operated principally at Detroit, transporting personnel and mail. After towing the patrol boat USS Welcome (SP-1175) to the American Boat Company dock at Detroit, Betty M. II was hauled out of the water for the winter on 26 November 1917 and inactivated prior to the seasonal icing over of the Great Lakes.

Relaunched after the spring thaw on 3 May 1918, Betty M. II was assigned to the Detroit and St. Clair River Patrol on the Detroit River and St. Clair River and, soon thereafter, resumed the transportation of personnel and mail. She continued these operations through the end of World War I.

On 25 November 1918, Betty M. II was hauled out of the water for the season and decommissioned. She was returned to Kotcher on 17 March 1919.
