= Welcome (name) =

Welcome is a given name and a surname. Notable people with the name include:

== Given name ==
- Welcome Arnold (1745–1798), American politician
- Welcome Chapman (1805–1893), early Mormon leader born in Readsboro, Vermont
- Welcome Duru (1933–2009), South African actor
- Welcome Gaston (1874–1944), professional baseball player
- Welcome Turner Jones (1865–1940), American physician
- Welcome Msomi (1943–2020), South African playwright, actor, and writer
- Welcome Ncita (born 1965), former professional boxer
- Welcome W. Wilson Jr. (born 1951), American businessman
- Welcome W. Wilson Sr. (1928–2024), American real estate executive
- Thomas Welcome Roys (c. 1815 – 1877), American whaleman

== Surname ==
- Georgie Welcome (born 1985), Honduran football striker currently in the Honduras national football team
- Henry Wellcome (1853–1936), American-British pharmaceutical entrepreneur
- Jennie Louise Touissant Welcome (1885–1956), American film director
- John Welcome (died 1580), English politician
- Ruth Welcome (1918–2005), German-born American zither player
- Shakur Welcome (born 1997), Caymanian footballer
- Shannon Welcome (born 1988), Honduran football player
- Thelma Kingsbury (later Thelma Welcome, born 1911), English-born American sportswoman
- Verda Welcome (1907–1990), American teacher, civil rights leader, and Maryland state senator

== See also ==
- Welcome (disambiguation)
