= Lightning Over Water =

- Film poster
- Directed by: Wim Wenders; Nicholas Ray
- Written by: Nicholas Ray; Wim Wenders
- Produced by: Pierre Cottrell; Chris Sievernich
- Starring: Nicholas Ray; Wim Wenders; Gerry Bamman; Ronee Blakley; Pierre Cottrell; Stefan Czapsky; Mitch Dubin; Tom Farrell
- Narrated by: Wim Wenders
- Cinematography: Edward Lachman; Mitch Dubin; Timothy Ray
- Edited by: Peter Przygodda; Wim Wenders
- Music by: Ronee Blakley
- Production companies: Road Movies Filmproduktion; Viking Film; Wim Wenders Productions; Wim Wenders Stiftung
- Distributed by: Basis-Film-Verleih GmbH (all media)
- Release date: 11 September 1980
- Running time: 90 minutes
- Countries: West Germany; Sweden
- Languages: English; German
- Budget: $700,000 (estimated)

Lightning Over Water, also known as Nick's Film, is a 1980 West German-Swedish documentary-drama film written, directed by and starring Wim Wenders and Nicholas Ray. It centers on the last days of Ray's own life, who was already known worldwide for his 1955 classic film Rebel Without a Cause. It was screened out of competition at the 1980 Cannes Film Festival.

== Summary ==
Lightning Over Water is a collaboration between Wenders and Ray to document Ray's last days due to terminal cancer in 1979. The film is partially an homage to Ray, who had a strong influence on Wenders' work, and partially an investigation on life and death. Ray's influence on Wenders includes Ray's "love on the run" subgenre as well as his film noir photography.

Excerpts from Ray's The Lusty Men (1952) and his unfinished final work We Can't Go Home Again are featured. The sequence with the former excerpt was shot at Vassar College, at which Ray presented the film and then gave a lecture, which itself is excerpted.

Ray appears in a minor role in Wenders' film The American Friend. Wenders' science fiction film Until the End of the World is named for the last spoken words in Ray's 1961 Biblical epic film King of Kings.

The crew is extensively seen onscreen. Jim Jarmusch, Ray's personal assistant at the time — and later a notable filmmaker in his own right — can be briefly glimpsed sitting at an editing console.

When Wenders goes to Vassar to attend a lecture, a brief one-man performance is seen onstage, Franz Kafka's "A Report to an Academy", about an ape who becomes a man.

== Cast ==
- Gerry Bamman as Self
- Ronee Blakley as Self
- Pierre Cottrell as Self
- Stefan Czapsky as Self
- Mitch Dubin as Self
- Tom Farrell as Self

== Production ==
After Ray's death, editor Peter Przygodda edited a 116-minute version without Wenders's involvement that played Out of Competition at the 1980 Cannes Film Festival. Wenders was dissatisfied with this version, and he re-edited the film with Przygodda to create a shorter director's cut.

The American filmmaker Jon Jost, who worked on the project at an early stage, wrote that Ray was suffering from severe mental decline during the production, accusing Wenders and Ray's widow Susan of making Ray work beyond his physical capacity.
