= Dharma Bums (band) =

American rock band

- Origin: Portland, Oregon, United States
- Genres: Garage rock (earlier), Alternative rock (later)
- Years active: 1987–1992
- Labels: PopLlama, Frontier, Tim/Kerr
- Past members: Jim Talstra; John Moen; Jeremy Wilson; Michael Sutton; Eric Lovre

Late 1980s flyer for band performances at the "Vogue" club in Seattle, WA. Dharma Bums is listed as playing on Wed 20, with their frequent opening act Nirvana listed on Sun 24. This flyer is now on display at the "Nirvana: Taking Punk to the Masses" exhibit in Seattle.

The Dharma Bums were a U.S. garage band, consisting of Jim Talstra, John Moen, Jeremy Wilson, and Eric Lovre. They named themselves after the Jack Kerouac book The Dharma Bums.

The band was formed in 1987 in Portland, Oregon, United States, by members of two local bands, The Watchmen and Perfect Circle (no connection with the later bands The Watchmen or A Perfect Circle). Their first album, Haywire, was produced by Scott McCaughey (lead singer of the Young Fresh Fellows) and recorded for the PopLlama label in 1989. McCaughey later played their debut to Frontier Records boss Lisa Fancher, who was impressed enough to re-release the album. One of the tracks, "Boots of Leather", proved to be an enduring college radio hit.

In 1990 the more polished album Bliss was released on Frontier Records. Featuring greatly improved songwriting, this release covered subjects including rape, adolescence, and suicide in a mature fashion built on ragged rock textures. Dharma Bums released their third and final album Welcome in 1992 and then disbanded. Wilson went on to form the alt-rock band Pilot.

Many in the local Portland scene had expected the Dharma Bums to be a breakthrough alternative rock act of the Northwest music scene. Some biographers, such as Melissa Rossi, author of Courtney Love: Queen of Noise, and Poppy Z Brite, author of Courtney Love: The Real Story, write that Courtney Love and Kurt Cobain first met each other at a Dharma Bums concert in Portland — when Nirvana served as the opening act. In an interview with Fuse TV posted on YouTube on March 11, 2012, Courtney Love herself says, "I met (Kurt) in 1988 at a Dharma Bums show."

== Discography ==
=== LPs ===
- Haywire (PopLLama Records, 1988)
- Bliss (Frontier Records, 1990)
- Welcome (Frontier Records, 1992)

=== Singles ===
- Haywire (7", PopLLama Records, 1988)
- Givin In (7", Frontier Records, 1991)
- Battle Of The Northwest Super Powers! (7", Frontier Records, 1992, Split 7" with Young Fresh Fellows)
