= Morgan Wootten =

American basketball coach (1931–2020)

Biographical details
- Born: April 21, 1931; Durham, North Carolina, U.S.
- Died: January 21, 2020 (aged 88); Hyattsville, Maryland, U.S.

Coaching career (HC unless noted)
- 1956–2002: DeMatha Catholic HS

Head coaching record
- Overall: 1274–192

Accomplishments and honors

Championships
- 5 high school national (1962, 1965, 1968, 1978, 1984); 22 Washington, D.C. (1961–1966, 1968, 1970–1973, 1978, 1979, 1981–1984, 1988, 1991, 1994, 1998, 2002); 33 WCAC (1961–1968, 1970–1976, 1978–1985, 1987, 1988, 1990–1992, 1994, 1996, 1998, 2001, 2002)
- Basketball Hall of Fame; Inducted in 2000

Morgan Bayard Wootten (April 21, 1931 – January 21, 2020) was an American high school basketball coach for 46 seasons at DeMatha Catholic High School in Hyattsville, Maryland. He led the Stags to five national championships and 33 Washington Catholic Athletic Conference (WCAC) titles. In 2000, he was the third high school coach to be inducted into the Naismith Memorial Basketball Hall of Fame and the first high school only coach to be inducted.

== Early life ==
Wootten was born in Durham, North Carolina on April 21, 1931, the son of a United States Navy officer Charles Thomas Wootten, Jr. and grandson of photographer Bayard Wootten. He grew up in Silver Spring, Maryland and attended Gonzaga College High School and Montgomery Blair High School, from which he graduated in 1950.

Wootten enrolled at Montgomery College and in 1951 began coaching baseball, football, and basketball at St. Joseph's Home and School for Boys, an orphanage in Washington, D.C. He transferred to the University of Maryland, College Park in 1953 and became the junior varsity basketball and football coach at St. John's College High School. He graduated from the University of Maryland in 1956 with degrees in physical education and history.

== Coaching career ==
In 1956, Wootten was hired as a history teacher and the coach of the football and basketball teams at DeMatha Catholic High School in Hyattsville, Maryland. Led by star player John Austin, the basketball team won its first conference title in 1961 and the national high school championship in 1962. In 1965, Wootten made national headlines when his DeMatha team beat Lew Alcindor's Power Memorial Academy and ended its 71-game winning streak.

Although his football teams had won three league titles, Wootten decided to focus on basketball after the 1968 season. He continued to teach world history to every DeMatha freshman until reducing his class load in 1980.

When he retired in 2002, Wootten's career coaching record stood at 1,274-192. In 46 seasons as the head coach of DeMatha basketball, he won five high school national championships, 22 Washington, D.C. titles, and 33 WCAC championships. Wootten has the second most wins as a head coach in the history of boys high school basketball, behind Robert Hughes.

Wootten never had a losing record, with his worst performance coming in the 1957–58 season, when DeMatha went 17–11, the only year his team did not have at least 20 wins. He had two perfect seasons, the first coming in 1977-78 (28-0) and the other in 1990-91 (30-0).

More than a dozen of Wootten's players went on to play in the NBA, including Adrian Dantley and Danny Ferry. Mike Brey, former head coach of the Notre Dame Fighting Irish men's basketball team, also played under Wootten.

UCLA basketball coach John Wooden (1910–2010) described his admiration for Wootten when he said, "I know of no finer coach at any level – high school, college or pro. I stand in awe of him." In 2000, Wootten became the third high school coach to be inducted into the Naismith Memorial Basketball Hall of Fame, and the first to be admitted solely as a high school coach. His overall record at the time was 1,210 wins and 183 losses. Wootten was one of the founders of the McDonald's All-American Game, whose annual player of the year award is named in his honor.

During his coaching career at DeMatha, located just two miles (3 km) away from his alma mater, he received job offers from North Carolina State, Georgetown, and American, as well as interest from Duke, Wake Forest, and Virginia. Wootten turned down the offers, according to Sports Illustrated, because the Maryland job, which was not forthcoming, was the only college job he wanted.

Upon retiring, DeMatha hired former player and 1991 graduate Mike Jones who led the Stags from 2002 to 2021 after spending four seasons an assistant under Wootten.

== Personal life and family ==
Wootten resided in University Park, Maryland with his wife, Kathy, whom he married in 1964. He had five children, Cathy, Carol, Tricia, Brendan, and Joe.

In 1996, Wootten nearly died because of a malfunctioning liver and was quickly rushed to the hospital for a liver transplant. Several years later, aged 75, one of his kidneys failed, and he received a transplant; the donor was his son, Joe.

Joe became a basketball coach at Bishop O'Connell High School in Arlington, Virginia. Wootten and his son both led one of the largest camps in the United States, Coach Wootten's Basketball Camp, held in Frostburg, Maryland at Frostburg State University and at Bishop O'Connell High School.

Wootten died January 21, 2020, at his home in Maryland, at the age of 88. He was surrounded by his wife Kathy and family.

== Media ==
Wootten co-authored two biographies with Bill Gilbert: From Orphans to Champions (1979), and A Coach for All Seasons (1997).

In 1992, Wootten wrote a manual for coaching, Coaching Basketball Successfully, with co-author Dave Gilbert. As second edition of the book was published in 2003, and a third edition in 2012, co-authored with Joe Wootten.

In 2017, the documentary film Morgan Wootten: The Godfather of Basketball was released. The film explores Wootten's coaching journey from a baseball coach at a small orphanage to the first high school basketball coach in the Naismith Memorial Basketball Hall of Fame, as well as his personal and family life. It was produced and directed by Bill Hayes, and features top coaches, players, and sports journalists, including Coach K, Roy Williams, Mike Brey, James Brown, John Feinstein and more.

Wootten appeared in the 2020 documentary Basketball County along DeMatha alums Victor Oladipo and Adrian Dantley. Wootten is one of the individuals memorialized in the ending of the film.

== Head coaching record ==
Record table
| Season | Team | Overall | Conference | Standing | Postseason |
|---|---|---|---|---|---|
Dematha Stags (Washington Catholic Athletic Conference) (1956–2002)
| 1956-57 | DeMatha | 22-10 | | | |
| 1957-58 | DeMatha | 17-11 | | | |
| 1958-59 | DeMatha | 23–10 | | | |
| 1959-60 | DeMatha | 22-7 | | | |
| 1960-61 | DeMatha | 27-1 | | 1st | Ranked 1st in D.C. Area |
| 1961-62 | DeMatha | 29-3 | | 1st | High School National Champions |
| 1962-63 | DeMatha | 36-4 | | 1st | Ranked 1st in D.C. Area |
| 1963-64 | DeMatha | 27-2 | | 1st | Ranked 1st in D.C. Area |
| 1964-65 | DeMatha | 28-1 | | 1st | High School National Champions |
| 1965-66 | DeMatha | 28-1 | | 1st | Ranked 1st in D.C. Area |
| 1966-67 | DeMatha | 26-5 | | | |
| 1967-68 | DeMatha | 27-1 | | 1st | High School National Champions |
| 1968-69 | DeMatha | 27-3 | | | |
| 1969-70 | DeMatha | 28-3 | | 1st | Ranked 1st in D.C. Area |
| 1970-71 | DeMatha | 29-2 | | 1st | Ranked 1st in D.C. Area |
| 1971-72 | DeMatha | 30-1 | | 1st | Ranked 1st in D.C. Area |
| 1972-73 | DeMatha | 30-1 | | 1st | Ranked 1st in D.C. Area |
| 1973-74 | DeMatha | 27-5 | | 1st | |
| 1974-75 | DeMatha | 26-5 | | 1st | |
| 1975-76 | DeMatha | 28-5 | | 1st | |
| 1976-77 | DeMatha | 29-4 | | | |
| 1977-78 | DeMatha | 28-0 | | 1st | High School National Champions |
| 1978-79 | DeMatha | 28-3 | | 1st | Ranked 1st in D.C. Area |
| 1979-80 | DeMatha | 27-4 | | 1st | |
| 1980-81 | DeMatha | 28-2 | | 1st | Ranked 1st in D.C. Area |
| 1981-82 | DeMatha | 28-3 | | 1st | Ranked 1st in D.C. Area |
| 1982-83 | DeMatha | 27-4 | | 1st | Ranked 1st in D.C. Area |
| 1983-84 | DeMatha | 29-2 | | 1st | High School National Champions |
| 1984-85 | DeMatha | 31-3 | | 1st | |
| 1985-86 | DeMatha | 26-7 | | | |
| 1986-87 | DeMatha | 28-6 | | 1st | |
| 1987-88 | DeMatha | 30-3 | | 1st | Ranked 1st in D.C. Area |
| 1988-89 | DeMatha | 27-5 | | | |
| 1989-90 | DeMatha | 26-8 | | 1st | |
| 1990-91 | DeMatha | 30-0 | | 1st | Ranked 1st in D.C. Area |
| 1991-92 | DeMatha | 31-2 | | 1st | |
| 1992-93 | DeMatha | 20-10 | | | |
| 1993-94 | DeMatha | 28-4 | | 1st | Ranked 1st in D.C. Area |
| 1994-95 | DeMatha | 26-7 | | | |
| 1995-96 | DeMatha | 31-5 | | 1st | |
| 1996-97 | DeMatha | 27-7 | | | |
| 1997-98 | DeMatha | 34-1 | | 1st | Ranked 1st in D.C. Area |
| 1998-99 | DeMatha | 28-4 | | | |
| 1999-2000 | DeMatha | 28-5 | | | |
| 2000-01 | DeMatha | 29-6 | | 1st | |
| 2001-02 | DeMatha | 32-3 | | 1st | Ranked 1st in D.C. Area |
| Total: | | 1274-192 | | | |
National champion Postseason invitational champion Conference regular season champion Conference regular season and conference tournament champion Division regular season champion Division regular season and conference tournament champion Conference tournament champion
