= E.T.D.S. =

Mixtape by IDK
- Released: January 23, 2026
- Studios: Clue (Los Angeles, California)
- Length: 35:51
- Labels: Broke; Rhymesayers
- Producers: IDK; Calvin Valentine; Conductor Williams; Daoud; Goldie; Jimmy Q; Joey Valence; Kaytranada; Jonathan Linav; Madlib; Eden Nagar; No I.D.; Rat Boy; Max Théodore

IDK chronology
Bravado + Intimo (2024)	E.T.D.S. (2026)

Singles from E.T.D.S.
- 1. "Clover" Released: March 21, 2025; 2. "Start to Finish – S.T.F" Released: October 15, 2025; 3. "Scary Merri" Released: November 14, 2025; 4. "Life 4 a Life" Released: January 9, 2026

E.T.D.S. (an initialism for Even the Devil Smiles) is the debut commercial mixtape (fifth overall) by British-American rapper IDK. It was released on January 23, 2026, via Broke Records and Rhymesayers Entertainment. Following his 2024 album Bravado + Intimo, it features collaborations with Black Thought, Likkle Jordee, Joey Valence & Brae, Pusha T, RZA, and Ogi, as well as posthumous vocal appearances from DMX and MF Doom. IDK primarily handled production himself, alongside a variety of notable producers including No I.D., Conductor Williams, Madlib, Goldie, and Kaytranada, among others.

Professional ratings
Review scores
Source	Rating
Hip Hop High Society	8.5/10
The Needle Drop	8/10
No Ripcord	7.5/10
Ratings Game Music	83%
Shatter the Standards	3.5/5 stars

== Background and promotion ==
After releasing his fourth studio album Bravado + Intimo in November 2024, IDK would remain prolific in making new music, releasing the singles "Flow", "S.U" with Denzel Curry, and "Mario Coins" from December 2024 to February 2025 in anticipation of the album's deluxe edition. Following its release in February 2025, "Clover" would be released on March 21. IDK would later release the single "Winston Wolf" with No I.D. in May, which allegedly hinted toward an upcoming mixtape titled Even the Devil Smokes. "Prince George" with Cordae followed in June.

"Start to Finish – S.T.F", a collaboration with DMX, was originally teased by LeBron James during his tour in Shanghai, China, in early October 2025, before being released on October 15 as the "first teaser" of a new project. Notably, it is the first collaboration approved by the late DMX's estate. "Scary Merri" was released on November 14, 2025, along with the mixtape's announcement. According to a press release, it "pulls from the immediacy" of 1990s/2000s mixtape culture, and is heavily related to his 15-year prison sentence that he was supposed to serve when he was 17 years old, of which he only served 3. "Life 4 a Life" with Pusha T was released on January 9, 2026, as the mixtape's final single, being described as a "thesis of sorts" for the project's themes.

E.T.D.S. was officially released on January 23, 2026, along with a music video for "Devil". IDK would showcase a custom-designed Land Rover Defender in collaboration with Galpin Auto Sports a week later. "Cell Block Freestyle / CD On" received a music video on February 4. On March 6, the rapper appeared on The Tonight Show Starring Jimmy Fallon to perform the songs "P.O", with guest appearances from Black Thought and Kaytranada, and "C.O.P".

A music video for "C.O.P", directed by Eric André, was released on April 7, 2026.

== Track listing ==
Credits have been adapted from Apple Music and Qobuz.

E.T.D.S. track listing
No.	Title	Writer(s)	Producer(s)	Length
1.	"Jason Mills"	Jason Mills; DeAngelo Sneed; Thomas Lea	IDK	0:31
2.	"Halo"	Mills; Sneed; Ernest Wilson; Daoud Anthony	No I.D.; Daoud	2:18
3.	"Devil"	Mills; Sneed; Lea; Otis Jackson (Note: Although these producers are not credited on streaming services, their contributions were confirmed by IDK on Instagram.)	IDK; Madlib; Eden Nagar	2:13
4.	"P.O" (with Black Thought and Likkle Jordee)	Mills; Tariq Trotter; Neil Fraser; Louis Celestin	Kaytranada	2:58
5.	"Clover" (with Joey Valence & Brae)	Mills; Joseph Bertolino; Braedan Lugue; Teppo Makÿnen	Joey Valence; Jonathan Linav; IDK (Note: Co-producer)	3:09
6.	"Stigma"	Mills; Clifford Price	IDK; Goldie	1:34
7.	"C.O.P"	Mills; Jordan Cardy	Rat Boy	2:27
8.	"Start to Finish – S.T.F" (with DMX)	Mills; Celestin; Earl Simmons; Pat Gallo	Kaytranada	1:56
9.	"Scary Merri"	Mills; Denzel Williams; Max Théodore	IDK; Conductor Williams; Théodore; Nagar	2:29
10.	"Cell Block Freestyle / CD On"	Mills; Wilson	IDK; No I.D.	1:47
11.	"Flakka" (with MF Doom)	Mills; Williams; Daniel Dumile; Théodore	Conductor Williams; Théodore	2:29
12.	"Misogynistical"	Mills; Jackson	IDK; Madlib	2:53
13.	"Life 4 a Life" (with Pusha T)	Mills; Celestin; Terrence Thornton	Kaytranada	2:59
14.	"Everyone Knows :)" (with RZA)	Mills; Robert Diggs, Jr.; Nagar; Gabriel Edelmann; Charif Megarbane	Nagar; Calvin Valentine	2:39
15.	"Scrambled Eggs – TBC :(" (with Ogi)	Mills; Williams; Lea; Ogi Ifediora; Jimmy Quinn	Conductor Williams; Jimmy Q	3:11
Total length:				35:51

=== Notes ===
- No I.D. and Conductor Williams are credited as main artists for tracks they produced on streaming platforms.
- Tracks are stylized in all caps with the first instance of the letter "I" being kept in lowercase, except for "Life 4 a Life", which has both instances of "I" in lowercase.
- CD player packages of the album feature their own exclusive bonus tracks.

== Personnel ==
Adapted from Apple Music.

=== Vocalists ===
- IDK – vocals (all tracks)
- DeAngelo Sneed – vocals (1-2)
- Black Thought – vocals (4)
- Likkle Jordee – vocals (4)
- Joey Valence & Brae – vocals (5)
- DMX – vocals (8)
- MF Doom – vocals (11)
- Pusha T – vocals (13)
- RZA – vocals (14)
- Ogi – vocals (15)

=== Musicians ===
- Thomas Lea – violin (1, 3, 15)
- Eden Nagar – piano (3), synthesizer (9), guitar (15)
- Calvin Valentine – drums (5)
- Pierre Jameson – keyboards (5-6, 11-12)
- Mike Phillips – bass guitar (12)

=== Technical ===
- Eden Nagar – recording engineer, assistant mixing engineer
- Calin Enache – mixing engineer
- Mike Bozzi – mastering engineer

== Release history ==
Release history for E.T.D.S.
Region	Date	Label(s)	Format(s)	Edition	Ref.
Worldwide	January 23, 2026	Broke; Rhymesayers	Digital; streaming; cassette; CD; vinyl	Standard; Deluxe; Special	
