= Bravado + Intimo =

Studio album by IDK
- Released: November 1, 2024
- Recorded: 2023–2024
- Genre: Hip-hop
- Length: 32:28
- Label: IDK
- Producer: IDK; Blue Rondo; Blwyrmind; Evrgrn; Kenny Stuntin; Mario Luciano; Rascal; Tae Beast; Turbo

IDK chronology
F65 (2023)	Bravado + Intimo (2024)	E.T.D.S. (2026)

Singles from Bravado + Intimo
- 1. "Denim" Released: March 29, 2024; 2. "Tiffany" Released: June 21, 2024; 3. "Kickin!" Released: September 11, 2024; 4. "Supernova" Released: October 18, 2024; 5. "Flow" Released: December 20, 2024; 6. "S.U" Released: February 7, 2025; 7. "Mario Coins" Released: February 20, 2025

Deluxe album cover
- Bravado Intimo... cover

Bravado + Intimo ratings
Review scores
Source	Rating
The Observer	3/5 stars

Bravado + Intimo (shortened and stylized as B.i.) is the fifth studio album by British-American rapper and record producer IDK. It was self-released on November 1, 2024. The album features guest appearances from Gunna, Joey Badass, Conway the Machine, and TheArtist. Production was primarily handled by IDK himself, alongside Tae Beast, Mario Luciano, Blwyrmnd, and Turbo, among others. A deluxe edition, Bravado Intimo... or (Continued...), was released on February 25, 2025, adding 8 new tracks and guest appearances from Denzel Curry and Ab-Soul.

== Background and promotion ==
Following IDK's fourth studio album F65, Bravado + Intimo is considered to have trap and jazz influences.

In an interview with Hypebeast on November 5, IDK described why the songs are labeled with an B or an I after the title; these stand for bravado and intimo respectively. IDK describes the meanings of bravado and intimo, with bravado being the braggadocio, and intimo being internal thoughts and desires that IDK describes as his "true self."

== Release ==
IDK released the album's first single, "Denim" featuring Joey Badass on March 29, 2024. He released the album's second single, "Tiffany" featuring Gunna, on June 21, 2024. "Kickin", the album's third single, was released on September 11, 2024. On October 10, 2024, IDK announced the album's release date and tracklist. The album's fourth single, "Supernova" was released on October 18, 2024.

== Critical reception ==
Writing for The Observer, Damien Morris was critical of the album's lyrics, writing that "IDK’s rhymes rarely rise to the beats’ level."

== Track listing ==
Bravado + Intimo track listing
No.	Title	Writer(s)	Producer	Length
1.	"Hello"	Jason Mills	IDK; Blue Rondo; Eden Eliah Nagar^{[c]}	0:36
2.	"Celine in the Trap"	Mills; Donte Perkins; Nagar; Shawn Carter; Sean Combs; Thomas Brenneck; Bosco Mann; David Guy; Deleno Matthews; Leon Michels; Levar Coppin; Homer Steinweiss; Michael Deller	IDK; Tae Beast; Nagar^{[c]}	2:40
3.	"Tiffany" (featuring Gunna)	Mills; Sergio Kitchens; Chandler Great; Amman Nurani; Kenneth Redfield	Turbo; Evrgrn; Kenny Stuntin; IDK^{[a]}	2:22
4.	"Kickin!"	Mills; Simon Schranz	IDK; Blwyrmnd	2:22
5.	"Denim" (featuring Joey Badass)	Mills; Perkins; Jo-Vaughn Scott; Derek Gamlam; Mario Luciano; Tobias Breuer	Tae Beast; Mario Luciano; Rascal; Calvin Valentine^{[a]}; Blue Rondo^{[a]}	2:56
6.	"Miles Trumpet"	Mills; Perkins	IDK; Tae Beast; Nagar^{[c]}	3:19
7.	"Check!"	Mills; Perkins; Angel Bat David	Tae Beast	2:31
8.	"Papercuts"	Mills; Valentine	Valentine; Nagar^{[c]}	2:35
9.	"Switch" (featuring Conway the Machine)	Mills; Valentine; Demond Price	IDK; Valentine	3:30
10.	"Supernova" (featuring TheArtist)	Mills; Perkins; Erica McCauley; JaVonté Pollard	IDK; Tae Beast	4:05
11.	"See You Again"	Mills; Valentine	Valentine	3:35
12.	"Goodbi"	Mills; Valentine	Valentine; Nagar^{[c]}	1:53
Total length:				32:28

Bravado Intimo... (Continued...) additional track listing
No.	Title	Writer(s)	Producer	Length
1.	"..."	Mills	IDK	0:31
2.	"Mario Coins"	Mills; Perkins; Jason Wool; Lauren Santi; Luciano	Tae Beast; Luciano; Thurdi	2:05
3.	"S.U" (featuring Denzel Curry)	Mills; Curry; Gabriel Edelmann; Lukas McLaughlin; Oliver Easton; Serban Sirbu; Spencer Golanka	IDK; Kal Banx; Valentine; Banser^{[c]}; Joey Hamhock^{[c]}; Lucas Quinn^{[c]}; Easton^{[c]}	2:49
4.	"Still I" ("Denim" demo) (featuring Joey Badass)	Mills; Perkins; Scott; Breuer; Luciano	Tae Beast; Luciano; Rascal	2:55
5.	"Miles Trumpet 2"	Mills; Perkins	IDK; Tae Beast; Valentine; Nagar; Blue Rondo^{[c]}	2:32
6.	"Rich Man Dreams" (featuring Ab-Soul)	Mills; Herbert Anthony Stevens IV; Perkins; Gamlam; Wool; Santi; Luciano	Luciano; Tae Beast	4:05
7.	"Flow"	Mills; Perkins; Breuer	Rascal; Tae Beast; Jonathan Linav^{[c]}	1:51
20.	"Supernova" (acoustic)	Mills; Perkins; Pollard	IDK; Tae Beast	2:34
Total length:				51:54

=== Notes ===
- ^{^[c]} indicates a co-producer
- ^{^[a]} indicates an additional producer
- Track titles are stylized in all caps, although the letter "I" is kept in lowercase.
- "Celine in the Trap" contains samples of "Roc Boys (And the Winner Is)...", written by Sean Combs, Thomas Brenneck, Bosco Mann, David Guy, Deleno Matthews, Leon Michels, Levar Coppin, Michael Deller, and Shawn Carter, and performed by Jay-Z.
- "Supernova" contains interpolations of "Supernova", written by Donte Perkins and JaVonté Pollard, as performed by JaVonté.
