= Welcome (IDK song) =

2026 song by IDK featuring Eminem

Single by IDK featuring Eminem
- Released: November 13, 2026
- Genre: Hip-hop
- Length: 2:42
- Label: Clue No Clue; Shady; Interscope
- Songwriters: Jason Mills; Marshall Mathers; James Yancey; Simon Mavin
- Producers: J Dilla; Simon Mavin; IDK

IDK singles chronology
"Scandal" (2026)	"Welcome" (2026)

Eminem singles chronology
"Murdergram Deux" (2024)	"Welcome" (2026)

Music video
- "Welcome" on YouTube

"Welcome" is a song by American rapper IDK. It was released as the lead single from his upcoming album on November 13, 2026, through Clue No Clue, Shady Records, and Interscope Records; it also serves as IDK's first release under the latter two record labels. The song features fellow American rapper Eminem and incorporates a beat from J Dilla, who is credited posthumously. In addition, "Welcome" features additional production from Simon Mavin and IDK himself. While Eminem provides the hook on the song, IDK lyrically attacks his haters, asserts his dominance, and incorporates Future's "Stick Talk" (2016).

To promote the song, a mini-documentary titled No Plan B was released, which details IDK's upbringing and his visits to Detroit-based record store Melodies & Memories and Effigy Studios, Eminem's personal studio. The music video for "Welcome" showcases IDK riding in a 2004 Cadillac Escalade previously owned by J Dilla, with Nasaan, Proof's son, driving the car. Eminem also appears in the music video.

== Background ==
Eminem and J Dilla both came from the Detroit hip-hop scene in the 1990s. Although the former's close friend, Proof, worked closely with J Dilla under the duo, the Funky Cowboys, Eminem never rapped on a beat by the latter until the song "Welcome".

In January 2026, IDK released the concept mixtape Even the Devil Smiles, which featured posthumous appearances from MF Doom and DMX, as well as collaborations with Pusha T, Black Thought, and RZA. The same year, he released the single "Beyond the Brilliant Haze", which featured Peter Gabriel and Everything is Recorded.

Eminem remained active in 2026 by releasing "Madara" with Ez Mil, "Heal My Faith" with Kid Rock, and his debut album, Infinite, to digital streaming providers for its 30th anniversary. On November 11, it was reported that Eminem and IDK worked on music together, and that they were releasing a song two days later. IDK received the song's beat from J Dilla's estate.

== Music and lyrics ==
The beat for "Welcome" was produced by J Dilla with additional production from Simon Mavin and IDK. Only Eminem does the hook on the song, where he adjusts his pace to J Dilla's "signature drag." On the hook, Eminem raps: "Welcome to the party where everybody dies at the end". Lyrically, IDK attacks on his haters and asserts his dominance while interpolating Future's "Stick Talk" (2016).

== Release and music video ==
To promote "Welcome", a mini-documentary titled No Plan B was released, where IDK discusses his upbringing in Washington, D.C., Maryland, and Virginia. The documentary shows IDK visiting Michigan-based record store Melodies & Memories, as well as his conversation with Eminem in Effigy Studios. The former revealed that the first rap lyrics he memorized came from Eminem's lyrics. On November 13, 2026, "Welcome" was released by Clue No Clue, Shady, and Interscope Records as the lead single from his upcoming album.

The song's release was also accompanied with a music video directed by Vuhlandes. Shot in black and white in Detroit, the music video showcases IDK riding in a 2004 Cadillac Escalade previously owned by J Dilla, with Nasaan, Proof's son, driving the car. In addition, Eminem appears with IDK by rapping together in an apartment building hallway, and visual shots of street dancers, dice games, and parties appear in the music video. On the day of the song's release, IDK announced he got signed to Shady and Interscope for his future releases.

== Personnel ==
Credits were adapted from Tidal.

- Jason Mills – vocals, writing, production, drum machine, recording arranger
- Marshall Mathers – vocals, writing
- James Yancey – writing, production, drum machine
- Simon Mavin – writing, production
- Alex Turnay – mastering, mixing
- Eden Eliah Nagar – engineer

== Charts ==
Chart performance for "Welcome"
Chart (2026)	Peak position
New Zealand Hot Singles (RMNZ)	2
