= Basketball County: In the Water =

2020 American sports documentary

- Main promotional poster for Basketball County, taken in Cheverly, Maryland.
- Directed by: Jimmy Jenkins; John Beckham
- Written by: Amani Martin
- Produced by: Sarah Flynn; Amani Martin; Brean Cunningham; John Beckham; Kirk Fraser
- Edited by: David Marcus
- Music by: Jason Mills; Derrick Gamlam
- Production company: Thirty Five Ventures
- Distributed by: Showtime Networks
- Release date: May 15, 2020
- Running time: 52 minutes
- Country: United States of America
- Language: English

Basketball County: In the Water is a 2020 American sports documentary film produced by Kevin Durant's company Thirty Five Ventures. The film explores the culture surrounding youth basketball in Prince George's County, Maryland, an area that has produced a significant number of talented basketball players, including Durant. Durant and Prince George's County native Victor Oladipo served as executive producers, and local rapper Jason Mills narrated the film.

The film was distributed by Showtime Networks and debuted May 15, 2020 on the network's live and digital services.

== Synopsis ==
Prince George's County, Maryland (known locally and in the film as "PG County") has a long track record of producing successful basketball players, which they chalk up to something "in the water." The film traces basketball's prominence in the nation's capital back to Edwin Bancroft Henderson, dubbed "the father of black basketball," who thought that black youth would benefit from athletic skills. After racial unrest following the assassination of Martin Luther King, Jr., middle-class black families left Washington for suburban Prince George's County, which boasted hundreds of basketball courts at its parks. After the crack epidemic of the 1980s, youth basketball moved indoors to the county's recreation centers, which served as safe places for youth to play basketball and develop friendships.

The film also chronicles the career of Morgan Wootten, longtime coach of basketball powerhouse DeMatha Catholic High School, the effects of Len Bias' death on the Prince George's community, the role of Amateur Athletic Union teams in garnering player prestige, the influence of go-go music on players, and the role of AAU coach Curtis Malone in the lives of players before his arrest on federal drug charges in 2014. Durant's philanthropic ventures in the county are also chronicled. The film is dedicated to the memory of Bias, Wootten, and Durant's close friends Cliff Dixon, who died in an Atlanta shooting in 2019, and Jamar "Silent" Board, a DC playground basketball star who died suspiciously in December 2012.

Notable interviewees include Durant, Oladipo, Michael Beasley, Jerai and Jerami Grant, Morgan Wootten, Marissa Coleman, James Brown, Jeff Green, Walt Williams, Steve Francis, Brenda Frese, Adrian Dantley, Jarrett Jack, Kris Jenkins, Nate Britt, John Thompson, Michael Sweetney, Quinn Cook, Markelle Fultz, Lamman Rucker, DerMarr Johnson, and Nolan Smith.

== Release ==
Showtime released the film on its digital streaming service on May 15, 2020 ahead of its planned airing on its TV channel that same night.

== Reception ==
The film received positive reviews from critics, some of whom highlighted the role it played in providing basketball lore during the COVID-19 pandemic. Brady Langmann of Esquire gave the film a positive review, comparing it favorably to The Last Dance, a miniseries about Michael Jordan. Langmann called the film "a little too breezy for its own good," referring to the many subplots, but remarked that it was "more than worth the watch."
