= Trillectro Music Festival =

Annual outdoor festival in Washington, D.C.

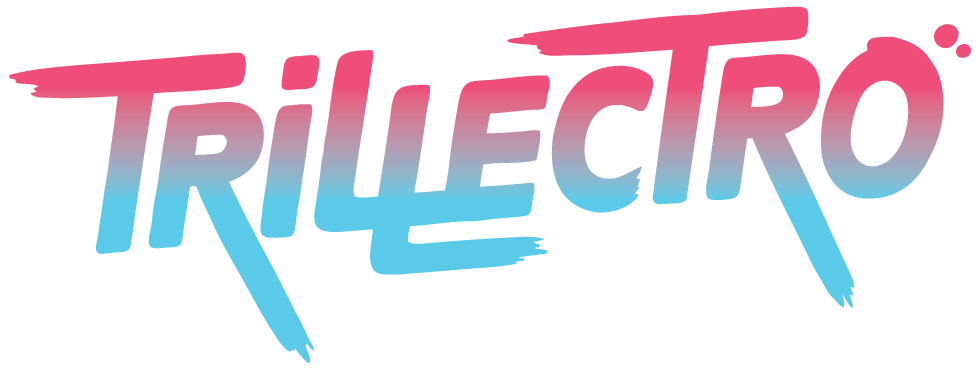
- Genre: Electronic dance music, Hip hop, Indie rock
- Dates: August 29, 2015
- Location: Washington, DC
- Years active: 2012-Present
- Founders: Quinn Coleman, Marcel Marshall, and Modele "Modi" Oyewole
- Website: Official Website

Trillectro Music Festival is a Washington, D.C.–based music festival founded in 2012. The annual single-day outdoor gathering features hip-hop, electronic, R&B and indie rock acts and is lauded for showcasing up-and-coming musicians on the eve of their big break.

== History ==
Organized by DC to BC, a music-marketing group started by three area natives, Trillectro is recognized as the area's first hip-hop and electronic music festival. The name Trillectro, a portmanteau of “trill” (meaning “authentic” in hip-hop circles) and “electro” (short for “electronic”), embodies the festival's credo of bridging the gap between music genres. Beyond music, the festival is also known as a showcase for local talent, including artists, vendors and small businesses.

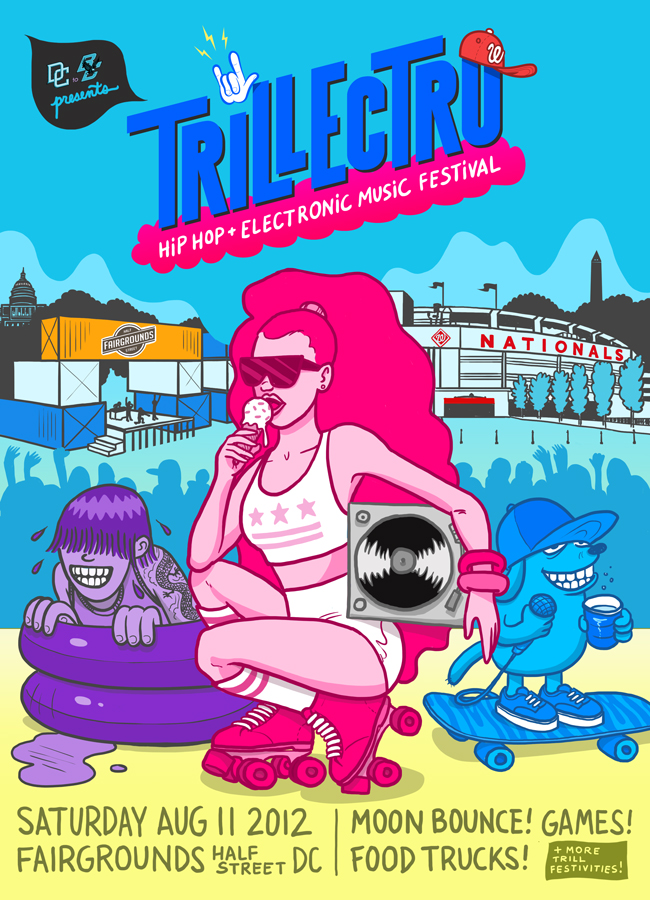
Trillectro 2012 Flyer Front

=== 2012 ===
The inaugural Trillectro was held on August 11, 2012, at The Half Street Fairgrounds near Nationals Park and featured two stages.

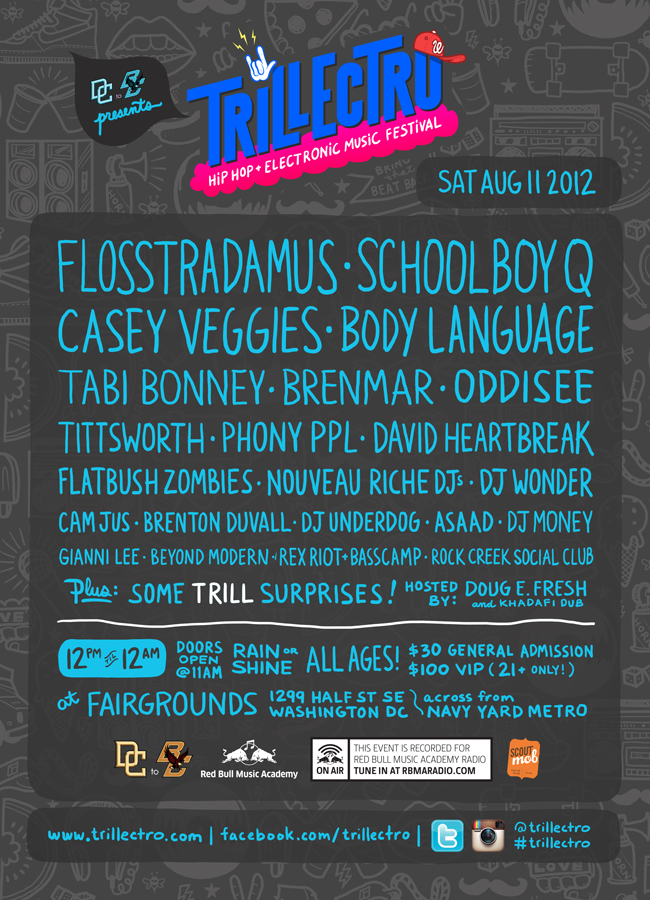
Trillectro 2012 Flyer Back

Acts:

- Schoolboy Q
- Casey Veggies
- Flosstradamus
- Tabi Bonney
- Tittsworth
- Oddisee
- Body Language
- DJ Wonder
- Cam Jus
- Brenton Duvall
- DJ Underdog
- ASAAD
- Gianni Lee
- DJ Money
- Beyond Modern
- Rex Riot + Basscamp
- Grande Marshall
- Locke Kaushal
- Nouveau Riche
- Phony Ppl
- Flatbush Zombies
- Brenmar
- DJ David Heartbreak
- Doug E. Fresh (Host)

=== 2013 ===
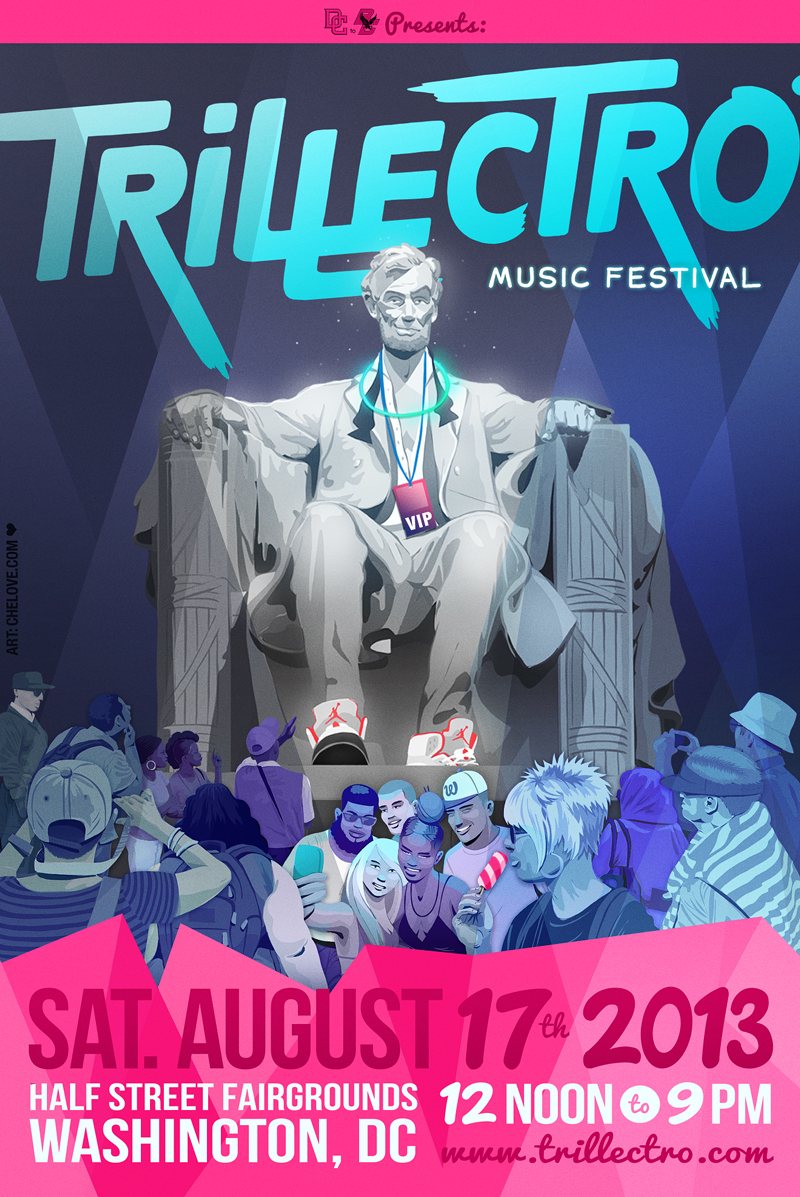
Trillectro 2013 Flyer Front

Trillectro 2013 was held on August 17 at The Half Street Fairgrounds near Nationals Park. The second year experienced a more than 100% growth rate, partially attributed to the organizers used of “crowdspeaking” platform Thunderclap. The social media campaign exceeded its supporter goal by 32% and reached over 5 million people.

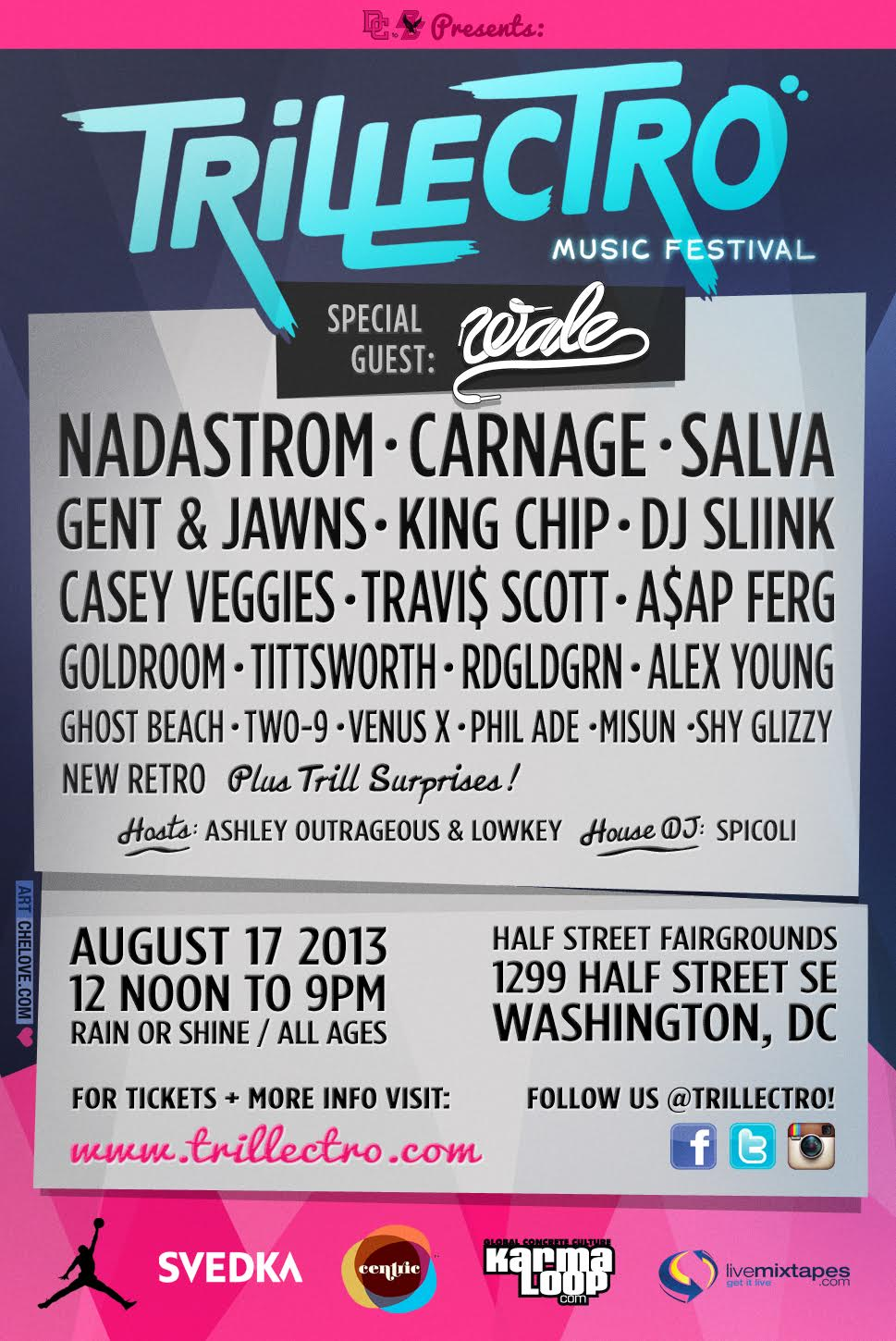
Trillectro 2013 Flyer Back

Acts:

- Wale (special guest)
- A$AP Rocky (surprise guest)
- A$AP Ferg
- Casey Veggies
- Travi$ Scott
- Fat Trel
- King Chip
- Shy Glizzy
- Tittsworth
- Nadastrom
- Phil Ade
- Ghost Beach
- DJ Sliink
- Gent & Jawns
- Goldroom
- Salva
- DJ Spicoli
- Misun
- Alex Young
- Venus X
- Two-9
- RDGLDGRN
- New Retro
- Carnage
- Lowkey and Ashley Outrageous (Host)

=== 2014 ===
To accommodate an expected rise in attendance, Trillectro 2014 moved to DC's historic RFK Stadium’s festival grounds and was held on August 23. In addition to the one-day event, the festival also hosted a handful of smaller parties throughout the week.

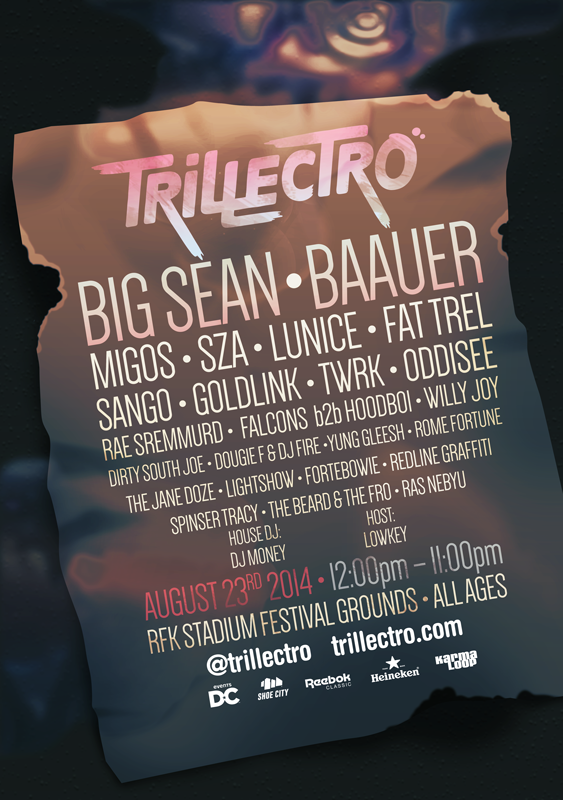
Trillectro 2014 Flyer

Acts:

- Big Sean
- Travi$ Scott (Surprise Guest)
- Migos
- Fat Trel
- Baauer
- Oddisee
- Rae Sremmurd
- Lunice
- Rome Fortune
- OG Maco
- SZA
- Lightshow
- Sango
- GoldLink
- Ras Nebyu
- The Beard & Th Fro
- Spinser Tracy
- Redline Graffiti
- Fortebowie
- The Jane Doze
- TWRK
- Falcons b2b Hoodboi
- Willy Joy
- DJ Money
- Dirty South Joe
- Dougie F & DJ Fire
- Lowkey & YesJulz (Host)

=== 2015 ===
On July 8, festival organizers announced that Trillectro 2015 will be held on Saturday, August 29 at Merriweather Post Pavilion in Columbia, Maryland.

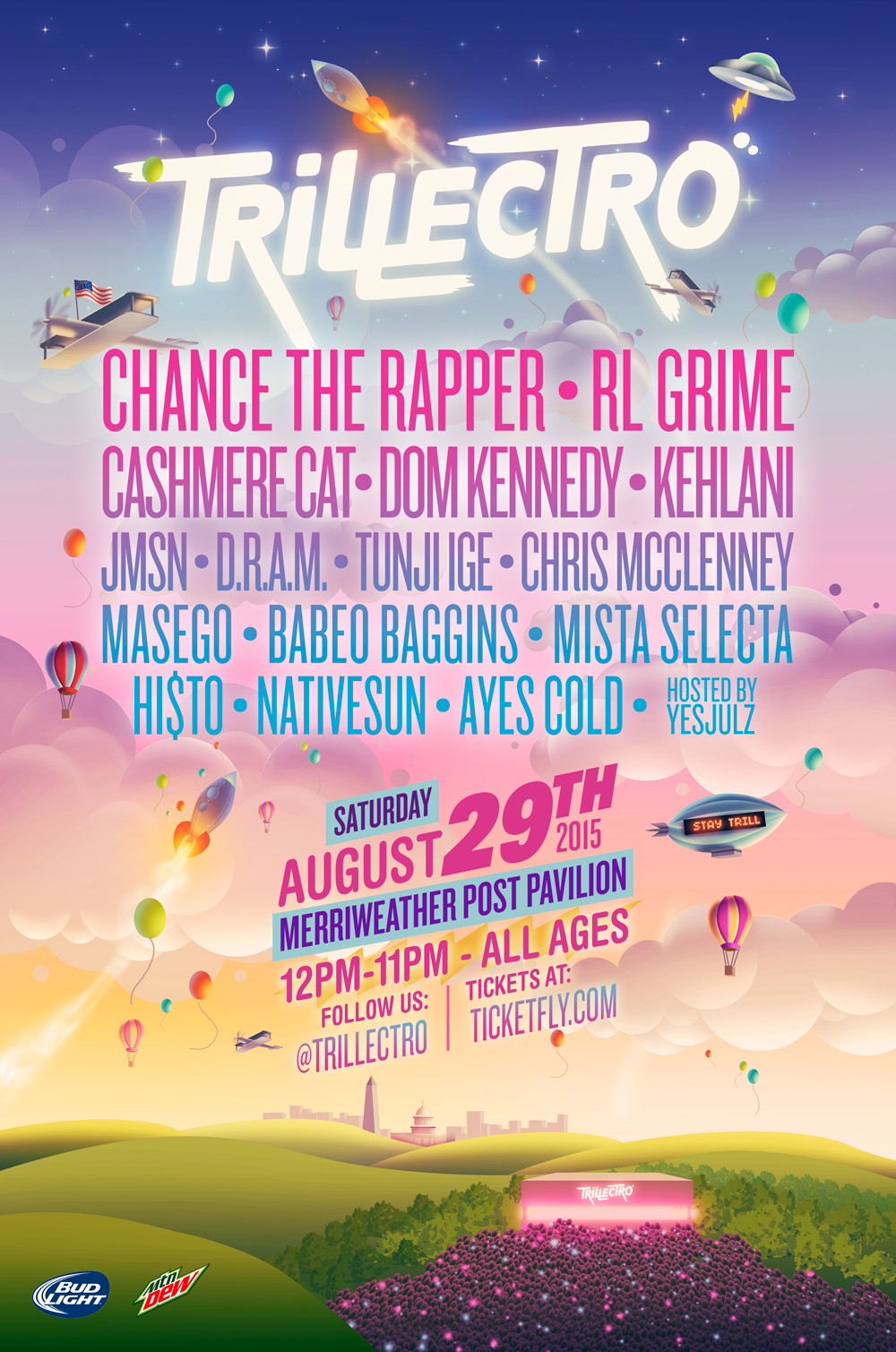
Trillectro 2015 Flyer

Acts:

- Chance the Rapper
- RL Grime
- Cashmere Cat
- Khelani
- JMSN
- DRAM
- Tunji Ige
- Chris McClenney
- Masego
- Babeo Baggins
- Mista Selecta
- Hi$to
- Nativeson
- Ayes Cold
- YesJulz (Host)
