= Is He Real (album) =

Is He Real?

Studio album by IDK
- Released: September 4, 2019
- Length: 35:46
- Label: Clue No Clue; Warner
- Producer: IDK; Blwyrmnd; Calvin Valentine; DJ Alizay; DTonez; Frank Dukes; Efosa Beloved; Kal Banx; Dante Marinelli; Eden Eliah Nagar; Obi Nwadije; Rascal; Razjah; Skyhutch; Thelonious Martin

IDK chronology
IDK & Friends (2018)	Is He Real? (2019)	IDK & Friends 2 (2020)

Singles from Is He Real?
- 1. "Digital" Released: May 24, 2019; 2. "24" Released: July 23, 2019

Is He Real? is the debut studio album by American rapper IDK. It was released on September 4, 2019, through Clue No Clue and Warner Records. It features guest appearances from DMX, Tyler, the Creator, Pusha T, JID, GLC, and Burna Boy; Frank Ocean was removed from the album due to last minute clearance issues.

== Critical reception ==
Aaron Williams of Uproxx praised its insightful handling of faith and criticism of organized religion, adding that "IDK’s raps are stitched through these rugged and sweet soundscapes alike with the stuttering grace of a power sewing machine." Sheldon Pearce of Pitchfork, gave the album a score of 6.3 out of 10, describing it as musically and lyrically uninteresting with "a whiff of self-importance". Ryan Middleton of Magnetic gave the album a positive review, praising its "raw and authentic" lyricism and its "dark" trap beats.

Professional ratings
Review scores
Source	Rating
Pitchfork	6.3/10

== Track listing ==
Is He Real? track listing
No.	Title	Writer(s)	Producer(s)	Length
1.	"Cloud Blu"	Jason Mills; Herbie Hancock; Bennie Maupin; Jean Carole Hancock	IDK; Rascal	1:15
2.	"42 Hundred Choices"	Mills	IDK; Skyhutch; DTonez	1:35
3.	"The "E" in Blue"	Mills; Earl Simmons; Kaseem Dean	IDK; Eden Eliah Nagar	0:53
4.	"Alone"	Mills; Arthur Reid; Euwart Beckford	IDK; Razjah; Nagar	2:54
5.	"24"	Mills	IDK; Blwyrmnd; Nagar	1:52
6.	"Lilly"	Mills; Adam Feeney; Kerney Thomas	IDK; Rascal; Frank Dukes; Nagar; Dante Marinelli	1:48
7.	"Porno"	Mills; Destin Route; Terrence Thornton; Ahmir Thompson; Fred Tackett; Malik Smart; Melvin Dinkins; Rehani Sayed; Scott Storch; Tarik Collins; Thomas Wlodarczyk	IDK; Rascal	3:21
8.	"I Do Me… You Do You"	Mills; Tyler Okonma; Richard Harrison	IDK; Nagar	1:33
9.	"December"	Mills; Damini Ogulu; Alton Taylor; Claydes Smith; Everton Bonner; George Brown; John Taylor; Lloyd Willis; Richard Westfield; Robert Bell; Ronald Bell; Robert Mickins; Sly Dunbar	IDK; Wallis Lane; DJ Alizay; Nagar; Obi Nwadije	3:30
10.	"European Skies"	Mills	IDK; Calvin Valentine; Nagar	3:40
11.	"No Cable"	Mills; Bobby Wilson; Charles Swann; Curtis Stewart; Darius Harrison; Dwayne Carter; Leonard Harris; Suzanne Swan	IDK; Kal Banx; Nwadije; Rascal; Efosa Beloved	3:04
12.	"Digital"	Mills	IDK; Kal Banx; Nagar	3:22
13.	"Michael What TF"	Mills; DeAndre Way; James Litherland; Jazmine Sullivan; Salaam Gibbs	Rascal	2:35
14.	"Julia…"	Mills	IDK; Thelonious Martin	4:24
Total length:				35:46
