= Welcome (Ronee Blakley album) =

Studio album by Ronee Blakley
- Released: 1975
- Recorded: July 1975, Muscle Shoals, Alabama
- Genres: Country rock, pop country
- Label: Warner Bros.
- Producer: Jerry Wexler

Ronee Blakley chronology
Ronee Blakley (1972)	Welcome (1975)	I Played It for You (2007)

Welcome is the second album by the American musician and actress Ronee Blakley, released in 1975. She supported it with a North American tour. Blakley also often performed "Need a New Sun Rising" as part of Bob Dylan's Rolling Thunder Revue. The album was reissued in 2006.

== Production ==
Recorded in July 1975 in Muscle Shoals, Alabama, the album was produced by Jerry Wexler, his first production after leaving a vice presidency at Atlantic Records. All of the lyrics, some of which had feminist themes, were written by Blakley. Buddy Emmons contributed on pedal steel. "Idaho Home" and "Tapedeck" were written for Blakley's film Nashville, released earlier in 1975.

== Critical reception ==
Professional ratings
Review scores
Source	Rating
AllMusic	2.5/5 stars
The New Rolling Stone Record Guide	1/5 stars

The Philadelphia Daily News praised the "slick country-rock". The Los Angeles Herald Examiner called the album "one of the most moving exercises in honest musical expression since Joni Mitchell's Blue." The News-Pilot noted Blakley's "diversified, capable and pleasant" voice. The Sacramento Bee admired her "original, deft and clever" lyrics.

Robert Hilburn, of the Los Angeles Times, opined that Blakley's singing and writing "are too uneven to warrant much attention in a pop-country field that already has such worthy representatives as Ronstadt and Emmylou Harris." United Press International noted Wexler's "clean, crisp and cohesive" production. The New Rolling Stone Record Guide considered the album to be a failed attempt "by Los Angeles into mainstream country music."

== Track listing ==
Side 1

1. "American Beauty"
2. "I Was Born to Love You (Naci para Amarte)"
3. "Please"
4. "Young Man"
5. "Idaho Home"
6. "She Lays It on the Line"

Side 2

1. "Nobody's Bride"
2. "If I Saw You in the Morning"
3. "Tapedeck"
4. "Need a New Sun Rising"
5. "Locked Behind My True Love's Door"
6. "Welcome"
