= Ogi (singer) =

American singer and songwriter

Ogi Ifediora, better known by her stage name Ogi, is an American musician of Nigerian descent. rhythm and blues singer. She is most noted for covering PJ Morton's song "Alright", and her 2021 single "I Got It" which was produced by American Grammy award-winning producer No I.D.

== Personal history ==
Ogi Ifediora was born in 1997 just outside of Chicago and raised in Madison, Wisconsin. From a young age, she loved music. Her grandmother often sang traditional Nigerian hymns to wake her up. She also regularly attended family prayer meetings, which incorporated hymns as well. This marked the beginning of Ogi's interest in dynamic and complex harmonies. In high school, she was a member of the jazz choir in addition to playing the viola. She then attended Northwestern University where she majored in political science and minored in legal studies. While there, she was a member of an a cappella group, THUNK a cappella.

During her senior year, she created an Instagram account where she posted covers of various songs, including PJ Morton’s song Alright. Once PJ Morton reposted her cover, she was then contacted by producer No I.D., who collaborated with her to create her first single, I Got It.

In 2022, Ogi released her first EP, Monologues. As a performer, she has supported and opened for artists such as The Marias, Mahalia, Snoh Aalegra, and Paramore. In June of 2022, she also performed at Pharell's Something in the Water festival. In 2022, Ogi made her debut BET Awards performance with "I Got It", her lead single from the Monologues EP.

In August 2026, she formed the duo Sunandmoon with producer Anoop D'Souza. The duo's debut EP, Tug of War, released in September 2026.

== Artistry ==
Her music has mostly been described as R&B, with influences from jazz and hip hop. She also says African music has had an impact on her rhythmic cadences.

== Discography ==
=== EPs ===
Title	Details
Monologues	Released: May 5, 2022; Label: ARTium Entertainment LLC, Atlantic Recording Corporation; Format: Digital download, streaming
