= Welcome Back =

Welcome Back may refer to:

== Albums ==
- Welcome Back (iKon album), 2015
- Welcome Back (Irène Schweizer and Han Bennink album), 2015
- Welcome Back (John Sebastian album), 1976
- Welcome Back (Mase album), 2004
- Welcome Back, a compilation album by 2NE1, 2024

== Songs ==
- "Welcome Back" (John Sebastian song), 1976, theme song for Welcome Back, Kotter
- "Welcome Back" (Mase song), 2004
- "Welcome Back", by Joey Badass from 2000, 2022
- "Welcome Back", by Paris Hilton from Infinite Icon, 2024

== Other uses ==
- Welcome Back (film), a 2015 Indian Hindi-language comedy film by Anees Bazmee, second in the Welcome film series
- "Welcome Back" program, Sony's compensation to users for the 2011 PlayStation Network outage
- Welcome Back Tour, a 2024–2025 concert tour by 2NE
- "Welcome Back" (Battle for Dream Island), a 2016 web series episode

== See also ==
- Welcome Back, Kotter, an American television sitcom
- Welcome Back, Brotter, a Boston University student TV series
