= Welcome (Dharma Bums album) =

Studio album by Dharma Bums
- Released: 1992
- Label: Frontier
- Producer: Ed Brooks, Dharma Bums

Dharma Bums chronology
Bliss (1990)	Welcome (1992)

Welcome is an album by the American band Dharma Bums, released in 1992. Issued via Frontier Records, it was the band's final album. A video was shot for "The Light in You", the album's first single. The band supported the album with European and North American tours. Welcome was a hit on college radio charts.

== Production ==
The album was produced by Ed Brooks and the band. Most of the songs are about romantic relationships; the band considered the sound to be similar to power pop. Dharma Bums were also influenced by the heavier music of the early 1990s Northwestern scene.

== Critical reception ==
Professional ratings
Review scores
Source	Rating
AllMusic	2.5/5 stars
MusicHound Rock: The Essential Album Guide	3/5 stars

The Oregonian wrote: "Rough-hewn but melodic, their sound works the guitar-bass-drums basics with freshness and fervor." The Arizona Daily Star deemed the songs "petulant, sweet, loose, jangly, folky." The Los Angeles Times determined that Welcome "combines sharp pop tunefulness with the transparent innocence and energy of youth." The Philadelphia Inquirer stated that Dharma Bums "make their sound from R.E.M.-style jingle-jangle crossed with a garage band's rugged edge."

The Houston Chronicle noted that the band "combines pop hooks and post-punk grunge with the energy of misspent youth." CD Review concluded that "Welcome finds the Bums just as up front and credible as ever, [reminiscent] of the Saints or the Hoodoo Gurus at those groups' very best." The Missoula Independent praised the "cosmic, emotive, accessible, modern rock vein." The Central New Jersey Home News opined that "melodies and solos are understated; there seems to be something dark simmering beneath."

AllMusic wrote that "most of Welcome consists of intriguing slices of moody jangle pop and country-tinged alt-rock that are all the more refreshing for the fact that none of them particularly sound like R.E.M." LA Weekly included Welcome among the best albums of 1992.

== Track listing ==
No.	Title	Length
1.	"The Light in You"
2.	"First Time/Last Time"
3.	"Good Advice"
4.	"Incestuous"
5.	"Porch Song"
6.	"A Push Me Pull Me"
7.	"Favor"
8.	"Wreck Around Town"
9.	"Bright Orange Spot"
10.	"Words"
11.	"Aces"
