= USS Welcome =

Patrol vessel of the United States Navy

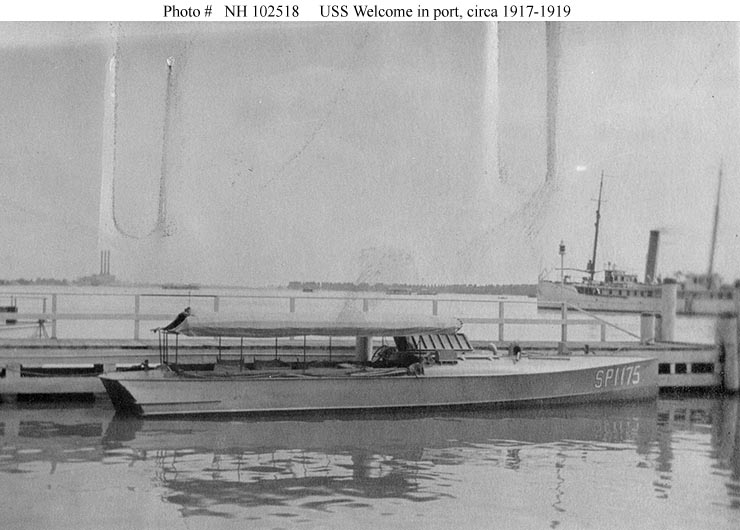
- USS Welcome (SP-1175) sometime between 1917 and 1919.

History

United States
- Name: USS Welcome
- Namesake: Previous name retained
- Completed: 1914
- Acquired: 7 August 1917
- Commissioned: 17 August 1917
- Stricken: 7 March 1919
- Fate: Returned to owner 7 March 1919
- Notes: Operated as private motorboat Welcome 1914–1917 and from 1919

General characteristics
- Type: Patrol vessel
- Tonnage: 4 gross register tons
- Length: 40 ft 0 in (12.19 m)
- Beam: 8 ft 0 in (2.44 m)
- Draft: 2 ft 6 in (0.76 m) mean
- Speed: 18.0 knots maximum
- Complement: 6
- Armament: none

USS Welcome (SP-1175) was a United States Navy patrol vessel in commission from 1917 to 1918 or 1919.

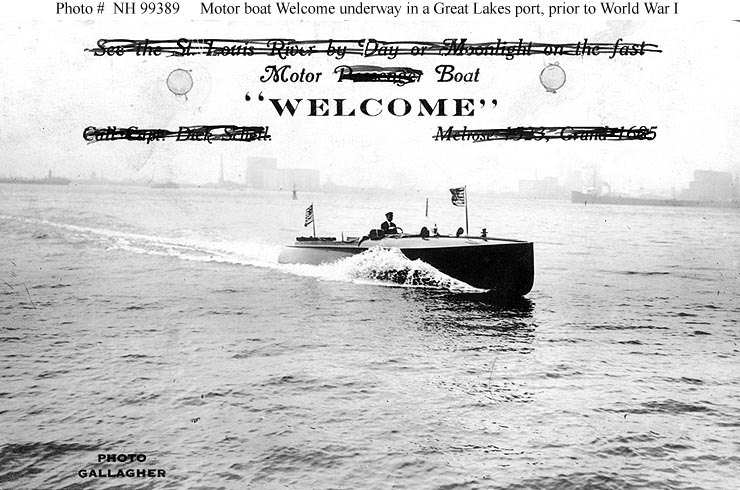
Welcome as a private motorboat sometime between 1914 and 1917, seen on a card advertising her for hire as a sightseeing boat on the Saint Louis River.

Welcome was built as a private open-cockpit motorboat of the same name at Saint Paul, Minnesota, in 1914. She was used as a commercial sightseeing boat on the Saint Louis River.

On 7 August 1917, the U.S. Navy acquired her under a free lease from her owner, R. H. Wilcox of Detroit, Michigan, for use as a section patrol boat during World War I. She was commissioned as USS Welcome (SP-1175) on 17 August 1917.

Welcome operated on patrol duties on the Great Lakes until the annual icing over of the lakes ended the 1917 shipping season, when the patrol boat USS Betty M. II (SP-623) towed her to the American Boat Company dock at Detroit, Michigan, in late November 1917 for seasonal lay-up. She returned to service after the spring thaw in 1918, and patrolled until the end of the 1918 shipping season in November 1918.

Welcome was returned to Wilcox on 7 March 1919 and stricken from the Navy Directory the same day.
