= Jucee Froot =

American rapper

- Born: Terrica Shanice Alexander; July 12, 1994 (age 32); Memphis, Tennessee
- Origin: Memphis, Tennessee
- Genres: Hip-hop
- Occupation: Rapper
- Years active: 2012–present
- Labels: Loyal 100 Entertainment; Art@War; Atlantic
- Website: officialjuceefroot.com

Terrica Shanice Alexander (born July 12, 1994), known professionally as Jucee Froot, is an American rapper from Memphis, Tennessee. She is best known for contributing songs to various film and TV soundtracks such as "Danger" from Birds of Prey (2020), "Eat Itself" from Insecure, and "Down in the Valley" from P-Valley. In 2020, Jucee Froot signed a joint recording contract with Atlantic Records and Art@War, and subsequently rose to prominence with the release of her debut mixtape, Black Sheep (2020).

== Discography ==
=== Studio albums ===
- Black Sheep (2020)

== Awards and nominations ==
| Award | Year | Category | Nominee(s) | Work | Result |
|---|---|---|---|---|---|
| Hollywood Music in Media Awards | 2021 | Best Main Title Theme – TV Show/Limited Series | Jucee Froot and Katori Hall | P-Valley | Nominated |
