= List of artists who have covered Bob Dylan songs =

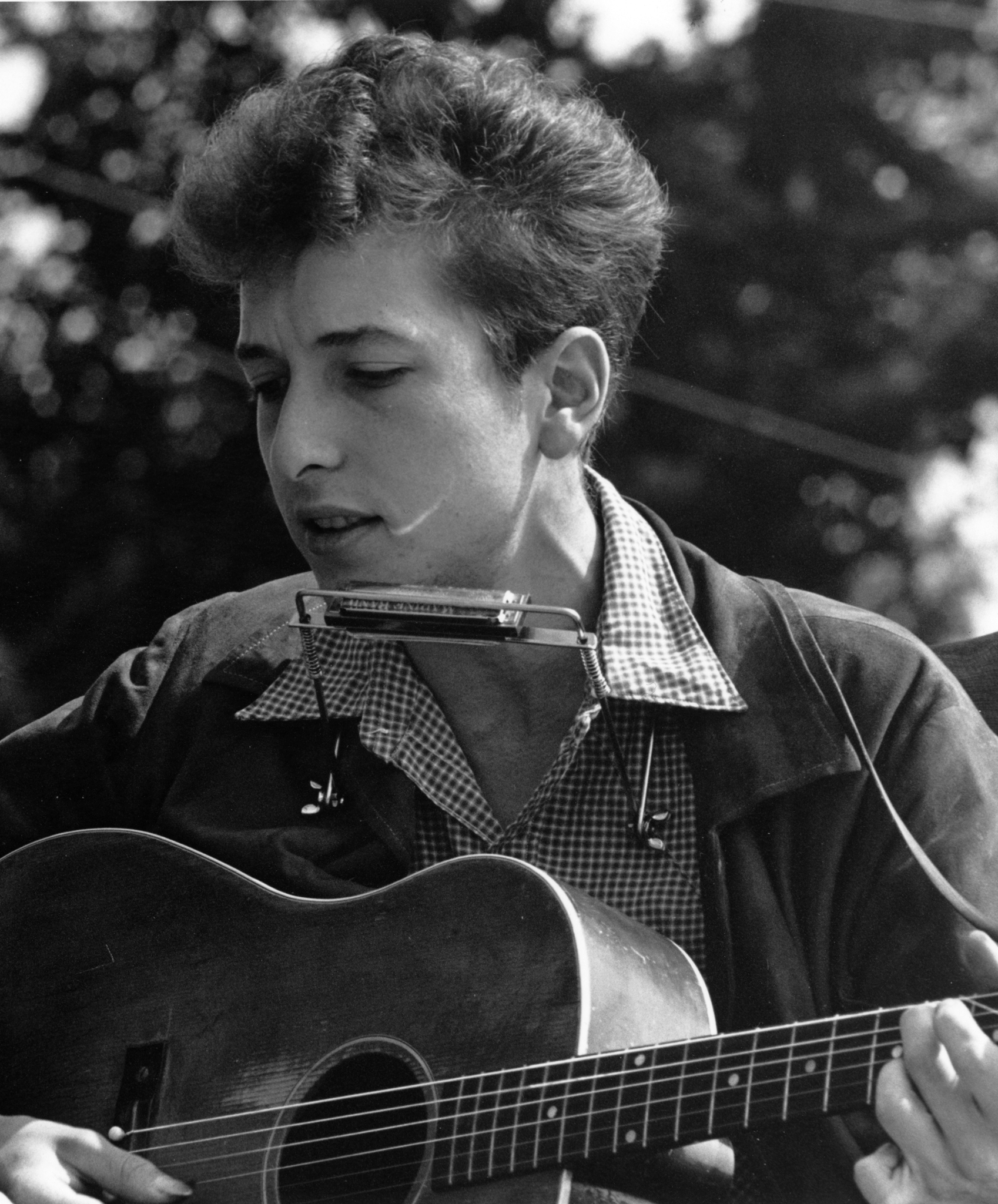

Bob Dylan (born Robert Allen Zimmerman on May 24, 1941) is an American singer–songwriter, author, poet, and painter who has been a major figure in popular music for more than six decades. Many major recording artists have covered Dylan's material, some even increasing a song's popularity as is the case with the Byrds' cover version of "Mr. Tambourine Man" and Jimi Hendrix's version of "All Along the Watchtower".

Over 600 musicians have released their own recordings of songs written by Dylan, creating more than 1,500 covers of nearly 300 unique songs.

== Sortable table of issued recordings ==
Artist	Song Title	Year of Release	Notes
13th Floor Elevators	It's All Over Now, Baby Blue	1967	
54-40	Walkin' Down the Line		
Lee Abramson	Masters of War	2013	
Adele	Make You Feel My Love	2008	
The Airborne Toxic Event	Boots of Spanish Leather	2012	
Eddie Albert	Blowin' in the Wind	1967	
Eddie Albert	Don't Think Twice, It's All Right	1967	
Albion Band	Lay Down Your Weary Tune	1995	
Albion Band	Seven Curses	1989	
Kris Allen	Make You Feel My Love	2009	
Gregg Allman	Going, Going, Gone	2017	
Alpha Band	You Angel You	1977	
Altan	Girl from the North Country	2003	
Wolfgang Ambros	Like a Rolling Stone	1978	Recorded as "Allan Wia A Stan"
Wolfgang Ambros	The Man in Me	1978	Recorded as "Da Mensch In Mir"
Wolfgang Ambros	Drifter's Escape	1978	Recorded as "Des Sandler's Flucht"
Wolfgang Ambros	It Ain't Me Babe	1978	Recorded as "Bin's Ned"
Wolfgang Ambros	Corrina, Corrina	1978	
Wolfgang Ambros	Love Minus Zero/No Limit	1978	Recorded as "Wahre Liebe"
Wolfgang Ambros	One of Us Must Know (Sooner or Later)	1978	Recorded as "Früher Oder Später"
Wolfgang Ambros	Temporary Like Achilles	1978	Recorded as "Achilles"
Wolfgang Ambros	She Belongs to Me	1978	Recorded as "Sie G'hört Zu Mir"
Wolfgang Ambros	Don't Think Twice, It's All Right	1978	Recorded as "Denk Ned Noch"
Anberlin	Like a Rolling Stone	2005	
Eric Andersen	A Hard Rain's a-Gonna Fall	2004	
Eric Andersen	John Brown	2005	
Anika	Masters of War	2010	
The Animals	I Shall Be Released	1968	
The Animals	It's All Over Now, Baby Blue	1977	
Antony and the Johnsons	Knockin' on Heaven's Door	2007	
Antony and the Johnsons	Pressing On	2010	
Eddy Arnold	Blowin' in the Wind	1964	
Articolo 31	Like a Rolling Stone	1998	Recorded as "Come Una Pietra Scalciata"
As Tall as Lions	Girl from the North Country	2005	
Richard Ashcroft	All Along The Watchtower	2025	Jo Whiley Sofa Sessions
The Association	One Too Many Mornings	1965	
Hugues Aufray	All I Really Want to Do	1965	Recorded as "Ce Que Je Veux Surtout"
Hugues Aufray	Ballad of Hollis Brown	1965	Recorded as "Ballade de Hollis Brown"
Hugues Aufray	Blowin' in the Wind	1995	Recorded as "Dans le Souffle du Vent"
Hugues Aufray	Don't Think Twice, It's All Right	1991	Recorded as "N'Y Pense Plus Tout Est Bien"
Hugues Aufray	Forever Young	1995	Recorded as "Jeune Pour Toujours"
Hugues Aufray	Girl from the North Country	1965	Recorded as ""La Fille du Nord"
Hugues Aufray	Heartland	2009	Recorded as "Au Coeur de Mon Pays"
Hugues Aufray	I Shall Be Released	1995	Recorded as "Nous Serons Libres"
Hugues Aufray	If You Gotta Go, Go Now	1995	Recorded as "Si Tu Dois Partir, Va-T-En"
Hugues Aufray	It Ain't Me Babe	1965	Recorded as "Ce N'Était Pas Moi"
Hugues Aufray	Knockin' on Heaven's Door	1995	Recorded as "Knock Knock Ouvre-Toi Porte du Ciel"
Hugues Aufray	Like a Rolling Stone	1995	Recorded as "Comme des Pierres Qui Roulent"
Hugues Aufray	The Lonesome Death of Hattie Carroll	1965	Recorded as "La Mort Solitaire de Hattie Carroll"
Hugues Aufray	Maggie's Farm	1995	Recorded as "Maggie la Ferme"
Hugues Aufray	Man Gave Names to All the Animals	1995	Recorded as "L'Homme Dota d'un Nom Chaque Animal"
Hugues Aufray	Motorpsycho Nightmare	1965	Recorded as "Cauchemar Psychomoteur"
Hugues Aufray	Mr. Tambourine Man	1965	Recorded as "L'Homme Orchestre"
Hugues Aufray	Outlaw Blues	1995	Recorded as "Le Blues du Hors-la-Loi"
Hugues Aufray	Oxford Town	1965	
Hugues Aufray	Rainy Day Women ♯12 & 35	2009	Recorded as "Tout L'mond' un Jour S'est Plante"
Hugues Aufray	The Times They Are A-Changin'	1965	Recorded as "Les Temps Changent"
Hugues Aufray	What Was It You Wanted	1995	Recorded as "tra Mais Q'uest-ce Que Tu Voulais?"
Hugues Aufray	When the Ship Comes In	1965	Recorded as "Le Jour Ou le Bateau Viendra"
Hugues Aufray	With God on Our Side	1965	Recorded as "Dieu Est a Nos Cotes"
Brian Auger and the Trinity with Julie Driscoll	This Wheel's on Fire	1968	Co-written with Rick Danko
The Avett Brothers	One Too Many Mornings	2012	With Johnny Cash
Zee Avi	Tomorrow Is a Long Time	2012	
Bad Religion	It's All Over Now, Baby Blue	2012	
Joan Baez	Blowin' in the Wind	1976	
Joan Baez	Boots of Spanish Leather	1968	
Joan Baez	Mama, You Been on My Mind	1965	Recorded as "Daddy, You Been on My Mind"
Joan Baez	Dear Landlord	1968	
Joan Baez	Don't Think Twice, It's All Right	1963	
Joan Baez	Drifter's Escape	1968	
Joan Baez	Farewell, Angelina	1965	
Joan Baez	Forever Young	1976	
Joan Baez	A Hard Rain's a-Gonna Fall	1965	
Joan Baez	I Dreamed I Saw St. Augustine	1968	
Joan Baez	I Pity the Poor Immigrant	1968	
Joan Baez	I Shall Be Released	1968	
Joan Baez	It Ain't Me Babe	1964	
Joan Baez	It's All Over Now, Baby Blue	1965	
Joan Baez	Lily, Rosemary and the Jack of Hearts	1976	
Joan Baez	Love Is Just a Four-Letter Word	1968	
Joan Baez	Love Minus Zero/No Limit	1968	
Joan Baez	North Country Blues	1968	
Joan Baez	One Too Many Mornings	1968	
Joan Baez	Restless Farewell	1968	
Joan Baez	Ring Them Bells	1995	
Joan Baez	Sad Eyed Lady of the Lowlands	1968	
Joan Baez	Seven Curses	1992	
Joan Baez	Simple Twist of Fate	1975	
Joan Baez	Tears of Rage	1968	Co-written with Richard Manuel
Joan Baez	Troubled and I Don't Know Why	1993	
Joan Baez	Walkin' Down the Line	1968	
Joan Baez	The Walls of Red Wing	1968	
Joan Baez	With God on Our Side	1963	
Joan Baez	You Ain't Goin' Nowhere	1968	
The Band	Blind Willie McTell	1993	
The Band	Don't Ya Tell Henry	1975	
The Band	I Must Love You Too Much	1996	Co-written with Helena Springs
The Band	I Shall Be Released	1968	
The Band	Long Distance Operator	1975	
The Band	One Too Many Mornings	2014	
The Band	Tears of Rage	1968	Co-written with Richard Manuel
The Band	This Wheel's on Fire	1968	Co-written with Rick Danko
The Band	When I Paint My Masterpiece	1971	
Band of Skulls	It Ain't Me Babe	2012	
BAP	Like a Rolling Stone	1982	Recorded as "Wie 'ne Stein"
Bobby Bare	Blowin' in the Wind	1965	
Bobby Bare	Don't Think Twice, It's All Right	1965	
Bobby Bare	It Ain't Me Babe	1966	
Jimmy Barnes	Seven Days	1987	
The Beach Boys	The Times They Are a-Changin'	1965	
The Beau Brummels	Mr. Tambourine Man	1966	
The Beau Brummels	One Too Many Mornings	1966	
Beck	Leopard-Skin Pill-Box Hat	2009	
Jeff Beck & Seal	Like a Rolling Stone	2012	
Jeff Beck Group	Tonight I'll Be Staying Here with You	1972	
Natasha Bedingfield	Ring Them Bells	2012	
Harry Belafonte	Forever Young	1981	
Harry Belafonte	Tomorrow Is a Long Time	1970	
The Belle Brigade	No Time to Think	2012	
Marco Benevento	Every Grain of Sand	2014	
Dierks Bentley	Señor (Tales of Yankee Power)	2012	
Eric Bibb	Buckets of Rain	2006	
Eric Bibb	Just Like a Woman	2003	
Acker Bilk	Lay Lady Lay		
Mira Billotte	As I Went Out One Morning	2007	
Andrew Bird	Oh, Sister	2007	Co-written with Jacques Levy
Mary Black	Lay Down Your Weary Tune	2005	
Mary Black	Make You Feel My Love	2005	
Mary Black	Ring Them Bells	1996	
The Black Crowes	Down in the Flood		
The Black Crowes	Forever Young		
The Black Crowes	Girl from the North Country	2008	
The Black Crowes	It Takes a Lot to Laugh, It Takes a Train to Cry		
The Black Crowes	Most Likely You Go Your Way and I'll Go Mine		
The Black Crowes	Rainy Day Women ♯12 & 35	1992	
The Black Crowes	Tonight I'll Be Staying Here with You	2013	
The Black Crowes	When the Night Comes Falling from the Sky	1998	
The Black Keys	The Wicked Messenger	2007	
Blackmore's Night	The Times They Are a-Changin'	2001	
Norman Blake	Restless Farewell	2001	With Peter Otroushko
Blitzen Trapper	Unbelievable	2014	
Luka Bloom	Make You Feel My Love	2000	
Blue Ash	Dusty Old Fairgrounds	1973	
James Blundell	I Shall Be Released	2001	
James Blunt	I Want You	2005	
Hanne Boel	Emotionally Yours	1994	
Hanne Boel	A Hard Rain's a-Gonna Fall	1994	
Michael Bolton	Like a Rolling Stone	1999	
Michael Bolton	Steel Bars	1991	Co-written with Michael Bolton
Michael Bolton & Helene Fischer	Make You Feel My Love	2011	
Gary U.S. Bonds	From a Buick 6	1981	
Graham Bonnet	I'll Be Your Baby Tonight	1976	
Graham Bonnet	It's All Over Now Baby Blue	1977	
Ray Bonneville	It Takes a Lot to Laugh, It Takes a Train to Cry	2011	
David Bowie	Tryin' to Get to Heaven	2021	
The Box Tops	I Shall Be Released	1969	
Billy Bragg	Lay Down Your Weary Tune	2012	
Billy Bragg	Talkin' World War III Blues	2011	
Bonnie Bramlett	Forever Young	1976	
Brewer & Shipley	All Along the Watchtower	1969	
Edie Brickell & New Bohemians	A Hard Rain's a-Gonna Fall	1989	
Jaime Brockett	One Too Many Mornings	1969	
Carl Broemel	Death Is Not the End	2014	
David Bromberg	It Takes a Lot to Laugh, It Takes a Train to Cry	2007	
David Bromberg	Wallflower	1974	
Garth Brooks	Make You Feel My Love	1998	
The Brothers and Sisters of L.A.	All Along the Watchtower	1969	
The Brothers and Sisters of L.A.	Chimes of Freedom	1969	
The Brothers and Sisters of L.A.	I Shall Be Released	1969	
The Brothers and Sisters of L.A.	I'll Be Your Baby Tonight	1969	
The Brothers and Sisters of L.A.	Just Like a Woman	1969	
The Brothers and Sisters of L.A.	Lay Lady Lay	1969	
The Brothers and Sisters of L.A.	The Mighty Quinn	1969	
The Brothers and Sisters of L.A.	Mr. Tambourine Man	1969	
The Brothers and Sisters of L.A.	My Back Pages	1969	
The Brothers and Sisters of L.A.	The Times They Are a-Changin'	1969	
The Brothers Four	Blowin' in the Wind		
The Brothers Four	Don't Think Twice, It's All Right		
The Brothers Four	Mr. Tambourine Man		
The Brothers Four	Tomorrow Is a Long Time		
Greg Brown	Pledging My Time	2001	
Jackson Browne	Love Minus Zero/No Limit	2012	
The Browns	Blowin' in the Wind	1964	
Ray Bryant	Blowin' in the Wind	1964	
Wendy Bucklew	Buckets of Rain	2002	
Jeff Buckley	Farewell, Angelina	1993	
Jeff Buckley	I Shall Be Released	1993	
Jeff Buckley	If You See Her, Say Hello	1993	
Jeff Buckley	Just Like a Woman	1993	
Jeff Buckley	Mama, You Been on My Mind	1994	
Buckwheat Zydeco	On a Night Like This	1987	
Built to Spill	Jokerman	2014	
Eric Burdon	Gotta Serve Somebody	2012	
Solomon Burke	Maggie's Farm	1965	
Solomon Burke	Quinn the Eskimo (The Mighty Quinn)	2000	
Solomon Burke	Stepchild	2002	
Solomon Burke	What Good Am I?	2005	
R.L. Burnside	Everything Is Broken	1999	
Boz Burrell	I Shall Be Released	1968	
Boz Burrell	Down in the Flood	1968	
Gary Burton	I Want You	1967	
Gary Burton	Just Like a Woman	1967	
Sam Bush	Girl from the North Country	2013	
Paul Butterfield	The Wanderin' Kind	1986	co-written with Helena Springs
The Byrds	All I Really Want to Do	1965	
The Byrds	Ballad of Easy Rider	1969	Co-written with Roger McGuinn. After viewing the end of the film of the same name, Dylan had his name removed from the song's credits.
The Byrds	Chimes of Freedom	1965	
The Byrds	It's All Over Now, Baby Blue	1969	
The Byrds	It's Alright, Ma (I'm Only Bleeding)	2000	
The Byrds	He Was a Friend of Mine	1990	
The Byrds	Just Like a Woman	1990	
The Byrds	Lay Down Your Weary Tune	1965	
The Byrds	Lay Lady Lay	1969	
The Byrds	Mr. Tambourine Man	1965	
The Byrds	My Back Pages	1967	
The Byrds	Nothing Was Delivered	1968	
The Byrds	Paths of Victory	1990	
The Byrds	Positively 4th Street	1970	
The Byrds	Spanish Harlem Incident	1965	
The Byrds	The Times They Are a-Changin'	1965	
The Byrds	This Wheel's on Fire	1969	
The Byrds	You Ain't Goin' Nowhere	1968	
Sebastian Cabot	Who Killed Davey Moore?	1967	
Sebastian Cabot	It Ain't Me Babe	1967	
Sebastian Cabot	Boots of Spanish Leather	1967	
Sebastian Cabot	Don't Think Twice, It's All Right	1967	
Sebastian Cabot	Tomorrow Is a Long Time	1967	
Sebastian Cabot	Blowin' in the Wind	1967	
Sebastian Cabot	Seven Curses	1967	
Sebastian Cabot	All I Really Want to Do	1967	
Sebastian Cabot	The Times They Are A-Changin'	1967	
Sebastian Cabot	Quit Your Low Down Ways	1967	
Sebastian Cabot	Like a Rolling Stone	1967	
Francis Cabrel	She Belongs to Me	2008	Recorded as "Elle M'Appartient (C'Est Une Artiste)"
Shirley Caesar	Gotta Serve Somebody	1980	
Cage the Elephant	The Lonesome Death of Hattie Carroll	2012	
Calexico & Charlotte Gainsbourg	Just Like a Woman	2007	
Calexico & Iron & Wine	Dark Eyes	2007	
Calexico & Jim James	Goin' to Acapulco	2007	
Calexico & Roger McGuinn	One More Cup of Coffee	2007	
Calexico & Willie Nelson	Señor (Tales of Yankee Power)	2007	
Hamilton Camp	Girl from the North Country	1964	
Hamilton Camp	Guess I'm Doin' Fine	1964	
Hamilton Camp	I Shall Be Released	1969	
Hamilton Camp	Long Time Gone	1964	
Hamilton Camp	Only a Hobo	1964	
Hamilton Camp	Paths of Victory	1964	
Hamilton Camp	Ring Them Bells	2005	
Hamilton Camp	Tomorrow Is a Long Time	1964	
Hamilton Camp	Walkin' Down the Line	1964	
Glen Campbell	All I Really Want to Do	1966	
Glen Campbell	Blowin' in the Wind	1966	
Glen Campbell	I Don't Believe You (She Acts Like We Never Have Met)	1966	
Glen Campbell	If Not for You	1973	
Glen Campbell	It Ain't Me Babe	1966	
Glen Campbell	Like a Rolling Stone	1966	
Glen Campbell	Mr. Tambourine Man	1966	
Glen Campbell	Subterranean Homesick Blues	1966	
Glen Campbell	Walkin' Down the Line	1964	
Tony Capstick	To Ramona	2011	
Don Carlos	Blowin' in the Wind	2004	
Carolina Chocolate Drops	Political World	2012	
Mary Chapin Carpenter	You Ain't Goin' Nowhere	1993	with Rosanne Cash and Shawn Colvin
Deana Carter	Lay Lady Lay	2007	
Martin Carthy	The Lonesome Death of Hattie Carroll	1999	
Martin Carthy	Oxford Town		
Neko Case	Buckets of Rain	2007	
Johnny Cash	Blowin' in the Wind	1992	on Late Night with David Letterman
Johnny Cash	Don't Think Twice, It's All Right	1965	
Johnny Cash	Forever Young	2005	
Johnny Cash	Girl from the North Country	1969	With Bob Dylan
Johnny Cash	It Ain't Me Babe	1965	With June Carter Cash
Johnny Cash	Mama, You Been on My Mind	1965	
Johnny Cash	One Too Many Mornings	1978	
Johnny Cash	Wanted Man	1969	
Rosanne Cash	Girl from the North Country	2009	
Rosanne Cash	You Ain't Goin' Nowhere	1993	With Shawn Colvin and Mary Chapin-Carpenter
Cat Power	4th Time Around	2023	
Cat Power	Ballad of a Thin Man	2023	
Cat Power	Desolation Row	2023	
Cat Power	I Believe in You	2008	
Cat Power	I Don't Believe You (She Acts Like We Never Have Met)	2023	
Cat Power	It's All Over Now, Baby Blue	2023	
Cat Power	Just Like a Woman	2023	
Cat Power	Just Like Tom Thumb's Blues	2023	
Cat Power	Leopard-Skin Pill-Box Hat	2023	
Cat Power	Like a Rolling Stone	2023	
Cat Power	Mr. Tambourine Man	2023	
Cat Power	One Too Many Mornings	2023	
Cat Power	Paths of Victory	2000	
Cat Power	She Belongs to Me	2023	
Cat Power	Stuck Inside of Mobile with the Memphis Blues Again	2007	
Cat Power	Tell Me, Momma	2023	
Cat Power	Visions of Johanna	2023	
Nick Cave & The Bad Seeds	Death Is Not the End	1996	
Nick Cave & The Bad Seeds	Wanted Man	1985	
Chad & Jeremy	Don't Think Twice, It's All Right	1965	
Chad & Jeremy	Mr. Tambourine Man	1965	
Timothée Chalamet	A Hard Rain's a-Gonna Fall	2024	
Timothée Chalamet	Highway 61 Revisited	2024	
Timothée Chalamet	I Was Young When I Left Home	2024	
Timothée Chalamet	It Takes a Lot to Laugh, It Takes a Train to Cry	2024	
Timothée Chalamet	It's All Over Now, Baby Blue	2024	
Timothée Chalamet	Like a Rolling Stone	2024	
Timothée Chalamet	Maggie's Farm	2024	
Timothée Chalamet	Masters of War	2024	
Timothée Chalamet	Mr. Tambourine Man	2024	
Timothée Chalamet	Song to Woody	2024	
Timothée Chalamet	Subterranean Homesick Blues	2024	
Timothée Chalamet	The Times They Are a-Changin'	2024	
Timothée Chalamet & Monica Barbaro	Blowin' in the Wind	2024	
Timothée Chalamet & Monica Barbaro	Don't Think Twice, It's All Right	2024	
Timothée Chalamet & Monica Barbaro	Girl from the North Country	2024	
Timothée Chalamet & Monica Barbaro	It Ain't Me Babe	2024	
Timothée Chalamet & Edward Norton	When the Ship Comes In	2024	
Michael Chapman	Ballad in Plain D	1977	
Tracy Chapman	The Times They Are a-Changin'	1993	
Cheap Trick	Please, Mrs. Henry	1977	
C.J. Chenier	Absolutely Sweet Marie	2003	
Cher	All I Really Want to Do	1965	
Cher	Blowin' in the Wind	1965	
Cher	Don't Think Twice, It's All Right	1965	
Cher	I Threw It All Away	1969	
Cher	I Want You	1966	
Cher	Lay Lady Lay	1969	Recorded as "Lay, Baby, Lay (Lay Lady Lay)"
Cher	Like a Rolling Stone	1966	
Cher	Masters of War	1968	
Cher	The Times They Are a-Changin'	1967	
Cher	Tonight I'll Be Staying Here with You	1969	
Vic Chesnutt	I Dreamed I Saw St. Augustine	1993	
Billy Childish	Ballad of Hollis Brown	2002	
The Chocolate Watchband	It's All Over Now, Baby Blue	1968	
Liam Clancy	Fare Thee Well (Farewell)	1993	
The Clancy Brothers	Girl from the North Country	1972	
The Clancy Brothers	Ramblin', Gamblin' Willie	1995	
The Clancy Brothers	When the Ship Comes In	1993	
Eric Clapton	Born in Time	1998	
Eric Clapton	Don't Think Twice, It's All Right	1993	
Eric Clapton	If I Don't Be There by Morning	1978	Co-written with Helena Springs
Eric Clapton	Knockin' on Heaven's Door	1975	
Eric Clapton	Not Dark Yet		
Eric Clapton	Sign Language	1976	
Eric Clapton	Walk Out in the Rain	1978	Co-written with Helena Springs
Gene Clark	I Pity the Poor Immigrant	1998	
Gene Clark	Mr. Tambourine Man	1984	
Gene Clark	Tears of Rage	1971	
Kelly Clarkson	Make You Feel My Love		
The Clash	The Man in Me	2004	
The Coal Porters	When the Ship Comes In	2001	
The Coal Porters	You Ain't Goin' Nowhere	2001	
Cobra Skulls	Subterranean Homesick Blues	2009	
Joe Cocker	Catfish	1976	Co-written with Jacques Levy
Joe Cocker	Dear Landlord	1969	
Joe Cocker	Dignity	1996	
Joe Cocker	Girl from the North Country	1970	
Joe Cocker	I Shall Be Released	1969	
Joe Cocker	Just Like a Woman	1969	
Joe Cocker	The Man in Me	1976	
Joe Cocker	Ring Them Bells	2007	
Joe Cocker	Seven Days	1981	
Joe Cocker	Watching the River Flow	1978	
David Allan Coe	Gotta Serve Somebody	1983	
Hannah Cohen	Covenant Woman	2014	
Coldplay	Simple Twist of Fate		
Natalie Cole	Gotta Serve Somebody	1999	
Deborah Coleman	Temporary Like Achilles	2003	
Judy Collins	Bob Dylan's Dream	1993	
Judy Collins	Mama, You Been on My Mind	1965	Recorded as "Daddy, You've Been on My Mind"
Judy Collins	Dark Eyes	1993	
Judy Collins	Farewell	1963	
Judy Collins	Gotta Serve Somebody	1993	
Judy Collins	I Believe in You	1993	
Judy Collins	I Pity the Poor Immigrant	1968	
Judy Collins	I'll Keep It with Mine	1965	
Judy Collins	It's All Over Now, Baby Blue	1993	
Judy Collins	Just Like a Woman	1993	
Judy Collins	Just Like Tom Thumb's Blues	1966	Recorded as "Tom Thumb's Blues"
Judy Collins	Like a Rolling Stone	1993	
Judy Collins	The Lonesome Death of Hattie Carroll	1964	
Judy Collins	Love Minus Zero/No Limit	1993	
Judy Collins	Masters of War	1963	
Judy Collins	Mr. Tambourine Man	1965	
Judy Collins	Simple Twist of Fate	1993	
Judy Collins	Sweetheart Like You	1993	
Judy Collins	Time Passes Slowly	1970	
Judy Collins	The Times They Are a-Changin'	2000	
Judy Collins	Tomorrow Is a Long Time	1965	
Judy Collins	With God on Our Side	1993	
Phil Collins	The Times They Are a-Changin'	1996	
Jessi Colter	Rainy Day Women ♯12 & 35	2006	
Shawn Colvin	You're Gonna Make Me Lonesome When You Go	1994	
Concrete Blonde	Simple Twist of Fate	1994	
Ray Conniff	Blowin' in the Wind	1987	
Ry Cooder	Need a Woman	1982	
Sam Cooke	Blowin' in the Wind	1964	
Rita Coolidge	I'll Be Your Baby Tonight	1972	
Rita Coolidge	Most Likely You Go Your Way and I'll Go Mine	1971	
Shemekia Copeland	I'll Be Your Baby Tonight	2012	
Hugh Cornwell	Stuck Inside of Mobile with the Memphis Blues Again	2005	
Elvis Costello	License to Kill	2012	
Elvis Costello	I Threw It All Away	1995	
Sean Costello	Obviously 5 Believers	2003	
Coulson, Dean, McGuinness, Flint	The Death of Emmett Till	1972	
Coulson, Dean, McGuinness, Flint	Don't You Tell Henry	1972	
Coulson, Dean, McGuinness, Flint	Eternal Circle	1972	
Coulson, Dean, McGuinness, Flint	Get Your Rocks Off	1972	
Coulson, Dean, McGuinness, Flint	I Wanna Be Your Lover	1972	
Coulson, Dean, McGuinness, Flint	Lo and Behold	1972	
Coulson, Dean, McGuinness, Flint	Lay Down Your Weary Tune	1972	
Coulson, Dean, McGuinness, Flint	Let Me Die In My Footsteps	1972	
Coulson, Dean, McGuinness, Flint	Odds and Ends	1972	
Coulson, Dean, McGuinness, Flint	Open the Door, Homer	1972	
Coulson, Dean, McGuinness, Flint	Sign on the Cross	1972	
Coulson, Dean, McGuinness, Flint	Tiny Montgomery	1972	
The Country Gentlemen	Girl from the North Country	1966	
The Country Gentlemen	It's All Over Now, Baby Blue	1968	
The Country Gentlemen	Walkin' Down the Line	1972	
Cowboy Junkies	If You Gotta Go, Go Now	1999	
Cracker	You Ain't Goin' Nowhere	2000	
Randy Crawford	Knockin' on Heaven's Door	1989	
Darren Criss	New Morning	2012	
Crocodiles	Outlaw Blues	2009	
Crooked Still	Oxford Town	2006	
Crosby, Stills & Nash	Girl from the North Country	2012	
Sheryl Crow	Mississippi	1998	
Sheryl Crow	Tombstone Blues	1999	
Crowded House	Mr. Tambourine Man	1988	With Roger McGuinn
The Crust Brothers	Goin' to Acapulco	1998	
King Curtis	Blowin' in the Wind	2006	
Miley Cyrus	You're Gonna Make Me Lonesome When You Go	2012	
Charlie Daniels	Country Pie	2014	
Charlie Daniels	Gotta Serve Somebody	2014	
Charlie Daniels	A Hard Rain's a-Gonna Fall	2014	
Charlie Daniels	I Shall Be Released	2014	
Charlie Daniels	I'll Be Your Baby Tonight	2014	
Charlie Daniels	Just Like a Woman	2014	
Charlie Daniels	Mr. Tambourine Man	2014	
Charlie Daniels	Quinn the Eskimo (Mighty Quinn)	2014	
Charlie Daniels	Tangled Up in Blue	2014	
Charlie Daniels	The Times They Are a-Changin'	2014	
Danú	Farewell, Angelina	2005	
Bobby Darin	Blowin' in the Wind	1963	
Bobby Darin	Don't Think Twice, It's All Right	1963	
N'Dea Davenport	One More Cup of Coffee (Valley Below)	1999	
Guy Davis	Sweetheart Like You	2007	
The Dead Weather	New Pony	2009	
Fabrizio De André	Desolation Row	1974	Recorded as "Via della Povertà"
Fabrizio De André	Romance in Durango	1978	Recorded as "Avventura a Durango"
Robert De Cormier Singers	Blowin' in the Wind	1966	
Deer Tick	Night After Night	2014	
Brett Dennen	You Ain't Goin' Nowhere	2012	
Sandy Denny	Ballad of Easy Rider	2000	Co-written with Roger McGuinn
Sandy Denny	Down in the Flood	1974	
Sandy Denny	Forever Young	1997	
Sandy Denny	Knockin' on Heaven's Door	1975	
Sandy Denny	Tomorrow Is a Long Time	1972	
Jackie DeShannon	Blowin' in the Wind	1963	
Jackie DeShannon	Don't Think Twice, It's All Right	1963	
Jackie DeShannon	Walkin' Down the Line	1963	
Devlin	All Along the Watchtower	2012	
DEVO	Gotta Serve Somebody	2000	
Sussan Deyhim	All I Really Want to Do	2012	
Neil Diamond	Make You Feel My Love	2008	
Hazel Dickens	Only a Hobo	1987	
Marlene Dietrich	Blowin' in the Wind	1965	Recorded as "Die Antwort weiß ganz allein der Wind"
Ani DiFranco	Hurricane	2000	Co-written with Jacques Levy
Ani DiFranco	Most of the Time	1997	
The Dillards	One Too Many Mornings	1991	
Dino, Desi & Billy	Chimes of Freedom	1965	
Dino, Desi & Billy	It Ain't Me Babe	1965	
Dino, Desi & Billy	Like a Rolling Stone	1965	
Dino, Desi & Billy	Mr. Tambourine Man	1965	
Dino, Desi & Billy	Spanish Harlem Incident	1966	
Dion	Farewell	1969	
Dion	It's All Over Now, Baby Blue	1969	
Dion	One Too Many Mornings	1992	
Dion	Spanish Harlem Incident	1978	
Dion	Tomorrow Is a Long Time	1968	
The Dixie Hummingbirds	City of Gold	2003	
John Doe	I Dreamed I Saw St. Augustine	2007	
John Doe	Pressing On	2007	
Dr. Feelgood	Highway 61 Revisited	1987	
Nick Drake	Don't Think Twice, It's All Right	1994	
Nick Drake	Tomorrow is a Long Time	2007	
Dream Syndicate	All Along the Watchtower	1989	
Dream Syndicate	Blind Willie McTell	1988	
Ronnie Drew and Eleanor Shanley	Boots of Spanish Leather	2000	
Ronnie Drew and Eleanor Shanley	Restless Farewell	2000	
The Dubliners with De Danann	Boots of Spanish Leather	1992	
Ducks Deluxe	Absolutely Sweet Marie	2010	
Ducks Deluxe	Simple Twist of Fate	2010	
Duran Duran	Lay Lady Lay	1995	
Steve Earle	One More Cup of Coffee (Valley Below)	2012	With Lucia Micarelli
Cliff Eberhardt	I Want You	2001	
Cliff Eberhardt	Just Like Tom Thumb's Blues	2011	
Echo & the Bunnymen	It's All Over Now, Baby Blue	1985	
Duane Eddy	All I Really Want to Do	1965	
Duane Eddy	Blowin' in the Wind	1965	
Duane Eddy	Don't Think Twice, It's All Right	1965	
Duane Eddy	It Ain't Me Babe	1965	
Duane Eddy	Love Minus Zero/No Limit	1965	
Duane Eddy	Mr. Tambourine Man	1965	
Duane Eddy	She Belongs to Me	1965	
Dave Edmunds	Outlaw Blues	1971	
Eels	Girl from the North Country	2006	
Duke Ellington	Blowin' in the Wind	1965	
Ramblin' Jack Elliott	Don't Think Twice, It's All Right	1968	
Ramblin' Jack Elliott	Girl from the North Country	1970	
Ramblin' Jack Elliott	He Was a Friend of Mine	1998	
Ramblin' Jack Elliott	I Threw It All Away	1981	
Ramblin' Jack Elliott	Just Like Tom Thumb's Blues	2007	
Ramblin' Jack Elliott	I'll Be Your Baby Tonight	1970	
Ramblin' Jack Elliott	Lay Lady Lay	1970	
Ramblin' Jack Elliott	Walls of Red Wing	1998	
Ramblin' Jack Elliott	With God on Our Side	1970	
Emerson, Lake & Palmer	Man in the Long Black Coat	1994	
Entombed	Ballad of Hollis Brown	2016	
Sertab Erener	One More Cup of Coffee	2000	
Paul Evans	Make You Feel My Love	2002	
Eve	Most Likely You Go Your Way And I'll Go Mine	1970	Recorded as "You Go Your Way"
The Everly Brothers	Abandoned Love	1984	
The Everly Brothers	Lay Lady Lay	1984	
Faces	The Wicked Messenger	1970	
Fairport Convention	Ballad of Easy Rider	1987	Co-written with Roger McGuinn
Fairport Convention	Country Pie	1982	
Fairport Convention	Dear Landlord	1987	
Fairport Convention	Down in the Flood	1974	
Fairport Convention	Forever Young	2000	
Fairport Convention	Highway 61 Revisited	2004	
Fairport Convention	I Don't Believe You (She Acts Like We Never Have Met)	2002	
Fairport Convention	I'll Keep It with Mine	1968	
Fairport Convention	If You Gotta Go, Go Now	1969	recorded in French as "Si Tu Dois Partir"
Fairport Convention	Jack O'Diamonds	1968	Adaptation of poems on Another Side of Bob Dylan album cover. (music by Ben Carruthers)
Fairport Convention	Lay Down Your Weary Tune	1995	
Fairport Convention	Million Dollar Bash	1969	
Fairport Convention	Tomorrow Is a Long Time	2001	
Fairport Convention	Percy's Song	1969	
Percy Faith	Blowin' in the Wind	1963	
Falco	It's All Over Now, Baby Blue	1985	
The Family Dogg	Love Minus Zero/No Limit	1969	
Chris Farlowe	It's All Over Now, Baby Blue	1992	
Chris Farlowe	Watching the River Flow	1995	
José Feliciano	Don't Think Twice, It's All Right	1965	
José Feliciano	I'll Be Your Baby Tonight	1968	
José Feliciano	Lay Lady Lay	1972	
José Feliciano	Masters of War	1966	
Julie Felix	Ballad of Hollis Brown	2002	
Julie Felix	Blowin' in the Wind	1982	
Julie Felix	Boots of Spanish Leather	2002	
Julie Felix	Chimes of Freedom	1967	
Julie Felix	Don't Think Twice, It's All Right	1964	
Julie Felix	Every Grain of Sand	2002	
Julie Felix	Forever Young	2008	
Julie Felix	Gates of Eden	1967	
Julie Felix	A Hard Rain's a-Gonna Fall	1999	
Julie Felix	I Shall Be Released	2002	
Julie Felix	It's Alright, Ma (I'm Only Bleeding)	2002	
Julie Felix	Just Like Tom Thumb's Blues	2002	
Julie Felix	The Lonesome Death of Hattie Carroll	2002	
Julie Felix	Long Black Coat	2008	
Julie Felix	Love Minus Zero/No Limit	1966	
Julie Felix	Man Gave Names to All the Animals	1980	
Julie Felix	Masters of War	1964	
Julie Felix	Mr. Tambourine Man	1982	
Julie Felix	My Back Pages	2008	
Julie Felix	Mystic Garden (Ain't Talkin')	2008	
Julie Felix	Not Dark Yet	2002	
Julie Felix	One More Cup of Coffee (Valley Below)	2002	
Julie Felix	One Too Many Mornings	1966	
Julie Felix	Romance in Durango	2002	
Julie Felix	Sad Eyed Lady of the Lowlands	2002	
Julie Felix	Subterranean Homesick Blues	2002	
Julie Felix	The Times They Are a-Changin'	1999	
Julie Felix	Visions of Johanna	2002	
Julie Felix	What Was It You Wanted	2008	
Julie Felix	When the Ship Comes In	1965	
Ferrante & Teicher	Lay Lady Lay	1991	
Bryan Ferry	All Along the Watchtower	2007	
Bryan Ferry	All I Really Want to Do	2007	
Bryan Ferry	Bob Dylan's Dream	2012	
Bryan Ferry	Don't Think Twice, It's All Right	2002	
Bryan Ferry	Gates of Eden	2007	
Bryan Ferry	A Hard Rain's a-Gonna Fall	1973	
Bryan Ferry	If Not for You	2007	
Bryan Ferry	It Ain't Me Babe	1974	
Bryan Ferry	It's All Over Now, Baby Blue	2002	
Bryan Ferry	Just Like Tom Thumb's Blues	2007	
Bryan Ferry	Knockin' on Heaven's Door	2007	
Bryan Ferry	Make You Feel My Love	2007	
Bryan Ferry	Positively 4th Street	2007	
Bryan Ferry	Simple Twist of Fate	2007	
Bryan Ferry	The Times They Are a-Changin'	2007	
Craig Finn	Sweetheart Like You	2014	
Neil Finn	She Belongs to Me	2012	
Fistful of Mercy	Buckets of Rain	2012	
Flamin' Groovies	Absolutely Sweet Marie	1979	
Flatt & Scruggs	Blowin' in the Wind	1967	
Flatt & Scruggs	Don't Think Twice, It's All Right	1967	
Flatt & Scruggs	Down in the Flood	1967	
Flatt & Scruggs	Girl from the North Country	1970	
Flatt & Scruggs	Honey, Just Allow Me One More Chance	1970	
Flatt & Scruggs	I'll Be Your Baby Tonight	1968	
Flatt & Scruggs	It Ain't Me Babe	1967	
Flatt & Scruggs	Like a Rolling Stone	1968	
Flatt & Scruggs	Maggie's Farm	1970	
Flatt & Scruggs	Mama, You Been on My Mind	1966	
Flatt & Scruggs	Mr. Tambourine Man	1967	
Flatt & Scruggs	Nashville Skyline Rag	1970	
Flatt & Scruggs	One More Night	1970	
Flatt & Scruggs	One Too Many Mornings	1970	
Flatt & Scruggs	Rainy Day Women ♯12 & 35	1968	
Flatt & Scruggs	The Times They Are a-Changin'	1968	
Flatt & Scruggs	Wanted Man	1970	
The Fleetwoods	It Ain't Me Babe	1965	
Flogging Molly	The Times They Are a-Changin'	2012	
Rosie Flores	Tonight I'll Be Staying Here with You	2007	
The Flying Burrito Brothers	I Shall Be Released	1988	
The Flying Burrito Brothers	If You Gotta Go, Go Now	1970	
The Flying Burrito Brothers	To Ramona	1971	
The Flying Burrito Brothers	You Ain't Going Nowhere	1985	
The Flying Pickets	Masters of War	1984	
Sue Foley	If You Gotta Go, Go Now	1995	
Sue Foley	Most Likely You Go Your Way and I'll Go Mine	2003	
Sue Foley	Positively 4th Street	2000	
Sue Foley	To Be Alone with You	1995	
Frazey Ford	One More Cup of Coffee	2010	
The Format	Simple Twist of Fate	2005	
The Four Seasons	All I Really Want to Do	1965	
The Four Seasons	Blowin' in the Wind	1965	
The Four Seasons	Don't Think Twice, It's All Right	1965	Recording as The Wonder Who?
The Four Seasons	Like a Rolling Stone	1965	
The Four Seasons	Mr. Tambourine Man	1965	
The Four Seasons	Queen Jane Approximately	1965	
Marcus Carl Franklin	When the Ship Comes In	2007	
Michael Franti	Subterranean Homesick Blues	2012	
Freelance Whales	New Morning	2012	
Aaron Freeman & Slash	Wiggle Wiggle	2014	
Bill Frisell	Just Like a Woman	1992	
Bill Frisell	Masters of War	2005	
The Frogs	Billy	2001	
Finbar Furey	Blowin' in the Wind	2014	
Tony Furtado	One Too Many Mornings	2004	
The Gadd Gang	Watching the River Flow	1986	
Charly García	Positively 4th Street	1995	
Jerry Garcia & David Grisman	The Ballad of Frankie Lee and Judas Priest	2004	
Jerry Garcia Band	Forever Young	2004	
Jerry Garcia Band	I Shall Be Released	1991	
Jerry Garcia Band	It Takes a Lot to Laugh, It Takes a Train to Cry	1973	
Jerry Garcia Band	Knockin' on Heaven's Door	1982	
Jerry Garcia Band	Positively 4th Street	1973	
Jerry Garcia Band	Señor (Tales of Yankee Power)	1991	
Jerry Garcia Band	Simple Twist of Fate	1991	
Jerry Garcia Band	Tangled Up in Blue	1991	
Jerry Garcia Band	Tears of Rage	1997	Co-written with Richard Manuel
Jerry Garcia Band	Tough Mama	1997	
Jerry Garcia Band	When I Paint My Masterpiece	2004	
Jerry Garcia Band	Wicked Messenger	2005	
The Gaslight Anthem	Changing of the Guards	2012	
Aviv Geffen	A Hard Rain's a-Gonna Fall	2000	Recorded as "Geshem Kaved Omed Lipol" (in Hebrew: גשם כבד עומד ליפול)
Stan Getz	Blowin' in the Wind	1964	
Giant Sand	Every Grain of Sand	1990	
Steve Gibbons	4th Time Around	1998	
Steve Gibbons	Absolutely Sweet Marie	1998	
Steve Gibbons	Dark Eyes	1998	
Steve Gibbons	Down Along the Cove	1998	
Steve Gibbons	Highway 61 Revisited	1998	
Steve Gibbons	I Am a Lonesome Hobo	1998	
Steve Gibbons	I Shall Be Released	2008	
Steve Gibbons	I Want You	1998	
Steve Gibbons	I'll Be Your Baby Tonight	2005	
Steve Gibbons	It Takes a Lot to Laugh, It Takes a Train to Cry	1998	
Steve Gibbons	Just Like a Woman	2008	
Steve Gibbons	Like a Rolling Stone	2008	
Steve Gibbons	Peggy Day	1998	
Steve Gibbons	Rainy Day Women Nos. 12 & 35	2008	
Steve Gibbons	Ring Them Bells	1998	
Steve Gibbons	She Belongs to Me	2008	
Steve Gibbons	Simple Twist of Fate	1998	
Steve Gibbons	Stuck Inside of Mobile With the Memphis Blues Again	1998	
Steve Gibbons	Sweetheart Like You	2008	
Steve Gibbons	Tonight I'll Be Staying Here with You	2008	
Steve Gibbons	When the Ship Comes In	1998	
Steve Gibbons	Winterlude	1998	
Steve Gibbons	Gotta Serve Somebody	2008	
Eliza Gilkyson	Jokerman	2011	
Eliza Gilkyson	Love Minus Zero/No Limit	2001	
Thea Gilmore	All Along the Watchtower	2011	
Thea Gilmore	As I Went Out One Morning	2011	
Thea Gilmore	The Ballad of Frankie Lee and Judas Priest	2011	
Thea Gilmore	Dear Landlord	2011	
Thea Gilmore	Down Along the Cove	2011	
Thea Gilmore	Drifter's Escape	2011	
Thea Gilmore	I Am a Lonesome Hobo	2011	
Thea Gilmore	I Dreamed I Saw St. Augustine	2011	
Thea Gilmore	I Pity the Poor Immigrant	2011	
Thea Gilmore	I'll Be Your Baby Tonight	2011	
Thea Gilmore	I'll Remember You	2012	
Thea Gilmore	John Wesley Harding	2011	
Thea Gilmore	The Wicked Messenger	2011	
Golden Earring	Ballad of a Thin Man	1995	
Golden Earring	This Wheel's on Fire	1995	Co-written with Rick Danko
John Gorka	Girl from the North Country	2001	
John Gorka	Just Like a Woman	2011	
John Gorka	Love Minus Zero/No Limit	1994	
Gov't Mule	I Shall Be Released	2005	
The Grass Roots	Ballad of a Thin Man	1966	recorded as "Mr. Jones (Ballad of a Thin Man)"
Grateful Dead	All Along the Watchtower	1996	
Grateful Dead	Ballad of a Thin Man	2002	
Grateful Dead	Desolation Row	2002	
Grateful Dead	It Takes a Lot to Laugh, It Takes a Train to Cry	2002	
Grateful Dead	It's All Over Now, Baby Blue	1997	
Grateful Dead	Just Like Tom Thumb's Blues	1997	
Grateful Dead	Maggie's Farm	2001	
Grateful Dead	Queen Jane Approximately	1997	
Grateful Dead	Quinn the Eskimo (Mighty Quinn)	2002	
Grateful Dead	She Belongs to Me	2001	
Grateful Dead	Stuck Inside of Mobile with the Memphis Blues Again	2001	
Grateful Dead	Visions of Johanna	1997	
Grateful Dead	When I Paint My Masterpiece	1996	
David Gray	Buckets of Rain	2007	
David Gray	One Too Many Mornings	2007	
David Gray	To Ramona	2007	
The Grease Band	New Morning	1975	
The Great Society	Outlaw Blues	1968	
Green Day	Like a Rolling Stone	2009	
Francesco de Gregori	If You See Her, Say Hello	1997	Recorded as "Non Dirle Che Non È Così"
Nanci Griffith	Boots of Spanish Leather	1993	
Boudewijn de Groot	The Times They Are a-Changin'	1966	Recorded as "Er Komen Andere Tijden"
Trey Gunn	Not Dark Yet	2015	
Guns N' Roses	Knockin' on Heaven's Door	1991	
Arlo Guthrie	Gates of Eden	1973	
Arlo Guthrie	Percy's Song	1970	
Arlo Guthrie	Walkin' Down the Line	1975	
Arlo Guthrie	When the Ship Comes In	1972	
Buddy Guy	Lay Lady Lay	2005	
Steve Hackett	Man in the Long Black Coat	2006	
Sammy Hagar	Rainy Day Women ♯12 & 35	2006	
Beres Hammond	Just Like a Woman	2004	
John Hammond	I'll Be Your Baby Tonight	2005	
Glen Hansard	Pressing On	2014	
Glen Hansard & Markéta Irglová	You Ain't Goin' Nowhere	2012	
Steve Harley	Love Minus Zero/No Limit	1996	
Emmylou Harris	Every Grain of Sand	1995	
Emmylou Harris	I'll Be Your Baby Tonight	1970	
Emmylou Harris	When I Paint My Masterpiece	1996	
George Harrison	Abandoned Love		
George Harrison	Absolutely Sweet Marie	1993	
George Harrison	I Don't Want to Do It	1985	
George Harrison	If Not for You	1970	
George Harrison	I'd Have You Anytime	1970	Co-written with George Harrison
George Harrison	Mama, You've Been on My Mind	2012	
Grant Hart	Masters of War	2010	
Hart-Rouge	With God on Our Side	2001	Recorded as "Dieu à Nos Cotés"
P. J. Harvey	Highway 61 Revisited	1993	
Richie Havens	All Along the Watchtower	1987	
Richie Havens	I Pity the Poor Immigrant	1968	
Richie Havens	If Not for You	1976	
Richie Havens	It's All Over Now, Baby Blue	1970	
Richie Havens	Just Like a Woman	1966	
Richie Havens	Maggie's Farm	1968	
Richie Havens	Oxford Town	1966	
Richie Havens	Sad Eyed Lady of the Lowlands	1974	
Richie Havens	Tombstone Blues	2007	
Edwin Hawkins Singers	Blowin' in the Wind	1969	
Sophie B. Hawkins	I Want You	1992	
Isaac Hayes	Lay Lady Lay	1999	
Robert Hazard	Blowin' in the Wind	1982	
The Jeff Healey Band	All Along the Watchtower	2008	
Heart	Ring Them Bells	1993	
Michael Hedges	All Along the Watchtower	1985	
Richard Hell and the Voidoids	Going Going Gone	1982	
Jimi Hendrix	All Along the Watchtower	1968	
Jimi Hendrix	Can You Please Crawl Out Your Window?	1998	
Jimi Hendrix	Drifter's Escape	1974	
Jimi Hendrix	Like a Rolling Stone	1970	
Jimi Hendrix	Tears of Rage	2010	
Nona Hendryx	Gotta Serve Somebody	2001	
The Heptones	I Shall Be Released	1977	
Carolyn Hester	Boots of Spanish Leather	2010	
Toots Hibbert	Maggie's Farm	2004	
Dan Hicks	Subterranean Homesick Blues	2009	
Chris Hillman	Farewell	1969	With The Hillmen, as "Fair Thee Well"
Chris Hillman	Tomorrow Is a Long Time	1982	
Chris Hillman	When the Ship Comes In	1969	with The Hillmen
Robyn Hitchcock	4th Time Around	2002	
Robyn Hitchcock	Ballad of a Thin Man	2002	
Robyn Hitchcock	Born in Time	2020	
Robyn Hitchcock	Desolation Row	2002	
Robyn Hitchcock	Dignity	2002	
Robyn Hitchcock	I Don't Believe You (She Acts Like We Never Have Met)	2002	
Robyn Hitchcock	It's All Over Now, Baby Blue	2002	
Robyn Hitchcock	Just Like Tom Thumb's Blues	2002	
Robyn Hitchcock	Leopard-Skin Pill-Box Hat	2002	
Robyn Hitchcock	Like a Rolling Stone	2002	
Robyn Hitchcock	Not Dark Yet	2002	
Robyn Hitchcock	One Too Many Mornings	2002	
Robyn Hitchcock	Tangled Up in Blue	2002	
Robyn Hitchcock	Tell Me Mama	2002	
Robyn Hitchcock	Tryin' to Get to Heaven Before They Close the Door	2004	
Robyn Hitchcock	Visions of Johanna	2002	
Robyn Hitchcock and the Egyptians	Chimes of Freedom	2008	
Susanna Hoffs & Rainy Day	I'll Keep It with Mine	1984	
The Hold Steady	Can You Please Crawl Out Your Window	2007	
Hole	It's All Over Now, Baby Blue	2000	
The Hollies	All I Really Want to Do	1969	
The Hollies	Blowin' in the Wind	1969	
The Hollies	I Shall Be Released	1969	
The Hollies	I Want You	1969	
The Hollies	I'll Be Your Baby Tonight	1969	
The Hollies	Just Like a Woman	1969	
The Hollies	My Back Pages	1969	
The Hollies	The Mighty Quinn	1969	
The Hollies	Quit Your Low Down Ways	1969	
The Hollies	This Wheel's on Fire	1969	Co-written with Rick Danko
The Hollies	The Times They Are a-Changin'	1969	
The Hollies	When the Ship Comes In	1969	
Holmes Brothers	Wallflower	1999	
Hot Tuna	Maggie's Farm	1992	
House of Fools	Blowin' in the Wind	2005	
Steve Howe	Buckets of Rain	1999	
Steve Howe	Don't Think Twice, It's All Right	1999	
Steve Howe	Going, Going, Gone	1999	
Steve Howe	I Don't Believe You	1999	
Steve Howe	It's All Over Now, Baby Blue	1999	
Steve Howe	Just Like a Woman	1999	
Steve Howe	Lay Lady Lay	1999	
Steve Howe	The Lonesome Death of Hattie Carroll	1999	
Steve Howe	Mama, You Been on My Mind	1999	
Steve Howe	One Too Many Mornings	1999	
Steve Howe	Sad Eyed Lady of the Lowlands	1999	
Steve Howe	Well, Well, Well	1999	Co-written with Danny O'Keefe
Mick Hucknall	One of Us Must Know (Sooner or Later)	2012	
Meg Hutchinson	Born in Time	2011	
Chrissie Hynde	Blind Willie McTell	2021	
Chrissie Hynde	Don't Fall Apart on Me	2021	
Chrissie Hynde	Every Grain of Sand	2021	
Chrissie Hynde	I Shall Be Released	1993	
Chrissie Hynde	In the Summertime	2021	
Chrissie Hynde	Love Minus Zero/No Limit	2021	
Chrissie Hynde	Tomorrow Is a Long Time	2021	
Chrissie Hynde	You're a Big Girl Now	2021	
Chrissie Hynde & James Walbourne	Sweetheart Like You	2021	
I Can Make a Mess	Positively 4th Street	2005	
Ian & Sylvia	Tomorrow Is a Long Time	1963	
Indigo Girls	All Along the Watchtower	1991	
Indigo Girls	Don't Think Twice, It's All Right	2010	
Indigo Girls	Tangled Up in Blue	1995	
Jeremy Irons	Make You Feel My Love	2006	
Gregory Isaacs	Mr. Tambourine Man	2004	
Isley Brothers	Lay Lady Lay	1971	
Ivan & Alyosha	You Changed My Life	2014	
Burl Ives	Don't Think Twice, It's All Right	1968	
Burl Ives	I'll Be Your Baby Tonight	1968	
Burl Ives	One Too Many Mornings	1968	
Burl Ives	The Times They Are a-Changin'	1968	
Jack's Mannequin	Mr. Tambourine Man	2012	
Jacob's Trouble	I Believe in You	1990	
Etta James	Gotta Serve Somebody	2000	
Etta James	Blowin' in the Wind	2002	
Jan & Dean	It Ain't Me Babe	1965	
Jason & the Scorchers	Absolutely Sweet Marie	1983	
Wyclef Jean	Knockin' on Heaven's Door	2002	
Jefferson Starship	Chimes of Freedom	2008	
Mason Jennings	The Lonesome Death of Hattie Carroll	2007	
Mason Jennings	The Times They Are a-Changin'	2007	
Waylon Jennings	Don't Think Twice, It's All Right	1964	
Jenoah	The Man in Me	2005	
Eilen Jewell	Walkin' Down the Line	2007	
Billy Joel	Highway 61 Revisited	2005	
Billy Joel	To Make You Feel My Love	1997	
Billy Joel	The Times They Are a-Changin'	1987	
Jack Johnson	I Shall Be Released	2012	
Jack Johnson	Mama, You Been on My Mind	2007	
Jack Johnson	Last Thoughts on Woody Guthrie	2007	
Wilko Johnson	Highway 61 Revisited	1978	
Davy Jones	It Ain't Me Babe	1965	
Norah Jones	I'll Be Your Baby Tonight	2002	
Norah Jones	Heart of Mine	2003	with The Peter Malick Group
Freek de Jonge & Stips	Death Is Not the End	1997	Recorded as "Leven Na de Dood"
Janis Joplin	Dear Landlord	1969	
Barb Jungr	Born in Time	2002	
Barb Jungr	Don't Think Twice, It's All Right	2002	
Barb Jungr	Every Grain of Sand	2002	
Barb Jungr	Forever Young	2002	
Barb Jungr	High Water (For Charley Patton)	2003	
Barb Jungr	I Shall Be Released	2005	
Barb Jungr	I Want You	2002	
Barb Jungr	I'll Be Your Baby Tonight	2002	
Barb Jungr	If Not for You	2002	
Barb Jungr	Is Your Love in Vain?	2002	
Barb Jungr	It's All Over Now, Baby Blue	2002	
Barb Jungr	Like a Rolling Stone	2003	
Barb Jungr	Not Dark Yet	2002	
Barb Jungr	Ring Them Bells	2002	
Barb Jungr	Sugar Baby	2002	
Barb Jungr	Tangled Up in Blue	2002	
Barb Jungr	Things Have Changed	2002	
Barb Jungr	Tomorrow Is a Long Time	2005	
Barb Jungr	What Good Am I?	2002	
Lucy Kaplansky	Every Grain of Sand	2011	
Lucy Kaplansky	It Ain't Me Babe	2001	
Karen O & Million Dollar Bashers	Highway 61 Revisited	2007	
Peter Keane	I Wanna Be Your Lover	2002	
Peter Keane	I Want You	1996	
Peter Keane	One Too Many Mornings	1991	
Ronan Keating	Make You Feel My Love	2009	
The Kennedys	Chimes of Freedom	2005	
Doug Kershaw	Subterranean Homesick Blues	2005	
Kesha	Don't Think Twice, It's All Right	2012	
Alicia Keys	Pressing On	2013	
Angélique Kidjo	Lay Lady Lay	2012	
Greg Kihn	Subterranean Homesick Blues	1994	
Ben E. King	Lay Lady Lay	1970	
Ben E. King	Tonight I'll Be Staying Here with You	1970	
Freddie King	Meet Me in the Morning	1975	
The Kingston Trio	Mama, You Been on My Mind	1969	Recorded as "Babe.y, You've Been on My Mind"
The Kingston Trio	Farewell	1964	
The Kingston Trio	One Too Many Mornings	1969	
The Kingston Trio	Tomorrow Is a Long Time	1969	
Kisschasy	She Belongs to Me	2005	
K'naan	With God on Our Side	2012	
Mark Knopfler	Restless Farewell	2012	
Diana Krall	Simple Twist of Fate	2012	
Diana Krall	Wallflower	2015	
Lenny Kravitz	Rainy Day Women ♯12 & 35	2012	
Kris Kristofferson	I'll Be Your Baby Tonight	1993	
Kris Kristofferson	Quinn the Eskimo (The Mighty Quinn)	2012	
Kronos Quartet	Don't Think Twice, It's All Right	2012	
Patti LaBelle	Most Likely You Go Your Way and I'll Go Mine	1977	
Ladysmith Black Mambazo	Knockin' on Heaven's Door	1997	with Dolly Parton
Jimmy LaFave	Buckets of Rain	1997	
Jimmy LaFave	Down in the Flood	1999	
Jimmy LaFave	Forever Young	1999	
Jimmy LaFave	I Threw It All Away	1999	
Jimmy LaFave	If Not for You	1999	
Jimmy LaFave	I'll Be Your Baby Tonight	1999	
Jimmy LaFave	It's All Over Now, Baby Blue	1999	
Jimmy LaFave	Just Like Tom Thumb's Blues	1999	
Jimmy LaFave	Oh, Sister	1999	
Jimmy LaFave	One Too Many Mornings	1999	
Jimmy LaFave	Positively 4th Street	1999	
Jimmy LaFave	Not Dark Yet	2007	
Jimmy LaFave	Red River Shore	2012	
Jimmy LaFave	Simple Twist of Fate	1999	
Jimmy LaFave	Tonight I'll Be Staying Here with You	1999	
Klaus Lage	Three Angels	1983	Recorded as "Drei Engel"
Greg Lake	I Must Love You Too Much	1981	Recorded as "Love You Too Much"
Dawn Landes & Bonnie Prince Billy	Dark Eyes	2014	
Mark Lanegan	Man in the Long Black Coat	2007	
Langhorne Slim & The Law	Got My Mind Made Up	2014	
Stoney LaRue	Forever Young	2005	
Bettye LaVette	Ain't Talkin'	2018	
Bettye LaVette	Do Right To Me Baby (Do Unto Others)	2018	
Bettye LaVette	Don't Fall Apart On Me Tonight	2018	
Bettye LaVette	Emotionally Yours	2018	
Bettye LaVette	Going, Going, Gone	2018	
Bettye LaVette	It Ain't Me Babe	2018	
Bettye LaVette	Mama, You Been On My Mind	2018	
Bettye LaVette	Most of the Time	2012	
Bettye LaVette	Political World	2018	
Bettye LaVette	Seeing the Real You At Last	2018	
Bettye LaVette	Things Have Changed	2018	
Bettye LaVette	The Times they Are a-Changin'	2018	
Bettye LaVette	What Was It You Wanted	2018	
Oren Lavie	4th Time Around	2012	
Avril Lavigne	Knockin' on Heaven's Door	2003	
The Leaves	Love Minus Zero/No Limit	1966	
Albert Lee	Lay Lady Lay	1991	
Albert Lee	Tears of Rage	1991	Co-written with Richard Manuel
Albert Lee	Tonight I'll Be Staying Here with You	1991	
Albert Lee	Too Much of Nothing	1991	
Leftover Salmon	Nashville Skyline Rag	2023	
Damien Leith	Blowin' in the Wind	2008	
Damien Leith	The Times They Are a-Changin'	2008	
Phil Lesh	All Along the Watchtower	2006	
The Lettermen	Mr. Tambourine Man	1966	
Jenny Lewis	Standing in the Doorway	2019	
Jerry Lee Lewis	Rita May	1979	
Ramsey Lewis	Quinn the Eskimo (The Mighty Quinn)	1968	
Gordon Lightfoot	Just Like Tom Thumb's Blues	1965	
Gordon Lightfoot	Ring Them Bells	1993	
Little Feat	It Takes a Lot to Laugh, It Takes a Train to Cry	2003	
J.C. Lodge	Don't Think Twice, It's All Right	2004	
Nils Lofgren & Paul Rodgers	Abandoned Love	2012	
Julie London	Quinn the Eskimo (The Mighty Quinn)	1969	
Trini Lopez	Blowin' in the Wind	1965	
Trini Lopez	Don't Think Twice, It's All Right	1965	
Los Lobos	Billy 1	2007	
Los Lobos	On a Night Like This	2003	
Lost Dogs	Lord, Protect My Child	1992	
Luciano	Knockin' on Heaven's Door	2005	
Lucius	When the Night Comes Falling from the Sky	2014	
Lulu	Quinn the Eskimo (The Mighty Quinn)	1969	
Lulu	Mr. Tambourine Man	1973	
David Lynch	The Ballad of Hollis Brown	2013	
Magna Carta	Tomorrow Is a Long Time	1976	
The Magokoro Brothers	My Back Pages	2003	
Taj Mahal	All Along the Watchtower	2003	
Taj Mahal	It Takes a Lot to Laugh, It Takes a Train to Cry	1994	
Taj Mahal	Bob Dylan's 115th Dream	2012	
Miriam Makeba	I Shall Be Released	1969	
Malaria!	Lay Lady Lay	1992	
Stephen Malkmus & The Million Dollar Bashers	Ballad of a Thin Man	2007	
Stephen Malkmus & The Million Dollar Bashers	Can't Leave Her Behind	2007	
Stephen Malkmus & The Million Dollar Bashers	Maggie's Farm	2007	
Johnny Mann Singers	Blowin' in the Wind	1964	
Johnny Mann Singers	Don't Think Twice, It's All Right	1964	
Manfred Mann	If You Gotta Go, Go Now	1966	
Manfred Mann	Just Like a Woman	1966	
Manfred Mann	Quinn the Eskimo (The Mighty Quinn)	1968	
Manfred Mann	With God on Our Side	1965	
Manfred Mann's Earth Band	Father of Night	1973	
Manfred Mann's Earth Band	Get Your Rocks Off	1973	
Manfred Mann's Earth Band	It's All Over Now, Baby Blue	1972	
Manfred Mann's Earth Band	The Mighty Quinn	1978	
Manfred Mann's Earth Band	Please, Mrs. Henry	1972	
Manfred Mann's Earth Band	Quit Your Low Down Ways	1975	
Manfred Mann's Earth Band	You Angel You	1979	
Manfred Mann's Earth Band	Shelter from the Storm	1996	
Mariachi El Bronx	Love Sick	2012	
Frank Marino & Mahogany Rush	All Along the Watchtower	1979	
Bob Marley & the Wailers	Like a Rolling Stone	1965	
Ziggy Marley	Blowin' in the Wind	2012	
Laura Marling	A Hard Rain's a-Gonna Fall	2017	
Maroon 5	I Shall Be Released	2012	
John Martyn	Don't Think Twice, It's All Right	1967	
John Martyn	Tight Connection to My Heart (Has Anybody Seen My Love)	1986	
Mary Lee's Corvette	Buckets of Rain	2002	
Mary Lee's Corvette	Idiot Wind	2002	
Mary Lee's Corvette	If You See Her, Say Hello	2002	
Mary Lee's Corvette	Lily, Rosemary and the Jack of Hearts	2002	
Mary Lee's Corvette	Meet Me in the Morning	2002	
Mary Lee's Corvette	Shelter from the Storm	2002	
Mary Lee's Corvette	Simple Twist of Fate	2002	
Mary Lee's Corvette	Tangled Up in Blue	2002	
Mary Lee's Corvette	You're a Big Girl Now	2002	
Mary Lee's Corvette	You're Gonna Make Me Lonesome When You Go	2002	
Dave Mason	All Along the Watchtower	1974	
Cerys Matthews	I Believe in You	2005	
Dave Matthews Band	All Along the Watchtower	2012	
Larry McCray	All Along the Watchtower	1999	
Bear McCreary	All Along the Watchtower	2007	
Brother Jack McDuff	Blowin' in the Wind	1966	
Roger McGuinn	Golden Loom	1977	
Roger McGuinn	Mr. Tambourine Man	1993	With Tom Petty and the Heartbreakers
Roger McGuinn	Knockin' on Heaven's Door	1993	
Roger McGuinn	Up to Me	1976	
Barry McGuire	It's All Over Now, Baby Blue	1965	
Barry McGuire	Masters of War	1968	
Barry McGuire	She Belongs to Me	1965	
McKendree Spring	John Wesley Harding	1969	
Ralph McTell	Gates of Eden	2007	
Ralph McTell	Love Minus Zero/No Limit	2007	
Ralph McTell	One Too Many Mornings	2007	
Ralph McTell	Song to Woody	2007	
Ralph McTell	To Ramona	2007	
Me First and the Gimme Gimmes	Blowin' in the Wind	2001	
Me First and the Gimme Gimmes	The Times They are a Changin'	2001	
Melanie	Don't Think Twice, It's All Right	1974	
Melanie	Hard Rain	1991	
Melanie	Lay Lady Lay	1971	
Melanie	Mr. Tambourine Man	1968	
Melanie	Sign on the Window	1971	
Dave Melillo	It Ain't Me Babe	2005	
John Mellencamp	Farewell, Angelina	1999	
John Mellencamp	Like a Rolling Stone	1993	
John Mellencamp	Leopard-Skin Pill-Box Hat	1993	
Katie Melua	Blowin' in the Wind		
The Merrymen	Blowin' in the Wind	1966	
Richard Meyer	North Country Blues	1994	
Bette Midler	Buckets of Rain	1976	with Bob Dylan
Bette Midler	I Shall Be Released	1973	
Buddy Miller	With God on Our Side	2004	
Frankie Miller	Just Like Tom Thumb's Blues	1972	
Jacob Miller	I Shall Be Released	1977	
Jody Miller	All I Really Want to Do	1965	
Blake Mills & Danielle Haim	Heart of Mine	2012	
Ministry	Lay Lady Lay	1996	
Mirah	Love Minus Zero/No Limit	2010	Recorded as "Love Minus Zero"
Chad Mitchell Trio	Blowin' in the Wind	1963	
Chad Mitchell Trio	Mr. Tambourine Man	1965	
Chad Mitchell Trio	With God on Our Side	1965	
Joni Mitchell	It's All Over Now, Baby Blue	1991	
Christy Moore	Song To Woody	1972	Recorded as "Tribute to Woody"
Christy Moore	The Lonesome Death of Hattie Carroll	2005	
Tom Morello	Blind Willie McTell	2012	
Van Morrison	All Along the Watchtower	1994	as part of a medley
Van Morrison	Just Like a Woman	2022	
Morrissey	Only a Pawn in Their Game	2019	
Dmytro Morykit	Lay Lady Lay	2017	
Mountain	Blowin' in the Wind	2007	Electric and acoustic versions
Mountain	Everything Is Broken	2007	
Mountain	Gotta Serve Somebody	2007	
Mountain	Heart of Mine	2007	
Mountain	Highway 61 Revisited	2007	
Mountain	Like a Rolling Stone	2007	
Mountain	Masters of War	2007	Featuring Ozzy Osbourne
Mountain	Mr. Tambourine Man	2007	
Mountain	Seven Days	2007	
Mountain	Subterranean Homesick Blues	2007	
Mountain	The Times They Are a-Changin'	2007	
Jason Mraz	A Hard Rain's a-Gonna Fall	2005	
Jason Mraz	Man Gave Names to All the Animals	2008	
Maria Muldaur	Ain't No Man Righteous, No Not One	1985	
Maria Muldaur	Buckets of Rain	2006	
Maria Muldaur	Golden Loom	2006	
Maria Muldaur	Heart of Mine	2006	
Maria Muldaur	I'll Be Your Baby Tonight	2006	
Maria Muldaur	Lay Lady Lay	2006	Recorded as "Lay Baby Lay (Lay Lady Lay)"
Maria Muldaur	Make You Feel My Love	2006	
Maria Muldaur	Moonlight	2006	
Maria Muldaur	On a Night Like This	2006	
Maria Muldaur	To Be Alone with You	2006	
Maria Muldaur	Wedding Song	2006	
Maria Muldaur	You Ain't Goin' Nowhere	2006	
Maria Muldaur	You're Gonna Make Me Lonesome When You Go	2006	
Gerry Mulligan	Mr. Tambourine Man	1965	
Peter Mulvey	Mama, You Been on My Mind	2002	
Mungo Jerry	Knockin' on Heaven's Door	2005	
My Chemical Romance	Desolation Row	2012	
My Morning Jacket	You're a Big Girl Now	2012	
Nazareth	Ballad of Hollis Brown	1973	
Youssou N'Dour	Chimes of Freedom	1994	
David Nelson Band	Absolutely Sweet Marie	1999	
David Nelson Band	Wicked Messenger	1997	
Ricky Nelson	I Shall Be Released	1970	
Ricky Nelson	If You Gotta Go, Go Now	1970	
Ricky Nelson	Just Like a Woman	1971	
Ricky Nelson	Love Minus Zero/No Limit	1971	
Ricky Nelson	Mama, You Been on My Mind	1993	
Ricky Nelson	She Belongs to Me	1970	
Ricky Nelson	Tonight I'll Be Staying Here with You	2011	
Ricky Nelson	Walkin' Down the Line	1967	
Tracy Nelson	I'll Be Your Baby Tonight	1975	
Tracy Nelson	It Takes a Lot to Laugh, It Takes a Train to Cry	1974	
Willie Nelson	What Was It You Wanted?	1993	
Willie Nelson	Heartland	1993	Co-written with Willie Nelson
Willie Nelson	Gotta Serve Somebody	2018	
Mike Ness	Don't Think Twice, It's All Right	1999	
Never Shout Never	It Ain't Me Babe		
Aaron Neville	Don't Fall Apart on Me Tonight	1993	
Aaron Neville	Gotta Serve Somebody	2003	
Aaron Neville	I Shall Be Released	2000	
Aaron Neville	Saving Grace	2003	
Cyril Neville	I Want You	2002	
Neville Brothers	Ballad of Hollis Brown	1989	
Neville Brothers	With God on Our Side	1989	
The New Christy Minstrels	Blowin' in the Wind	1967	
The New Christy Minstrels	Mr. Tambourine Man	1966	as "Mister Tamburino"
New Riders of the Purple Sage	Farewell, Angelina	1975	
New Riders of the Purple Sage	You Angel You	1974	
Olivia Newton-John	If Not for You	1971	
The Nice	She Belongs to Me	1969	
The Nice	Country Pie	2003	
Nickel Creek	Tomorrow Is a Long Time	2005	
Stevie Nicks	Just Like a Woman	1994	
Nico	I'll Keep It With Mine	1967	
Wolfgang Niedecken	All I Really Want to Do	2013	Recorded as "Alles, was ich zo jähn wöhr"
Wolfgang Niedecken	A Hard Rain's a-Gonna Fall	1995	Recorded as "Unfassbar vill Rähn"
Wolfgang Niedecken	One of Us must Know (Sooner or later)	1995	Recorded as "Fröher oder späader"
Wolfgang Niedecken	I Want You	1995	Recorded as "Ich will dich"
Wolfgang Niedecken	My back pages	1995	Recorded as "Vill passiert sickher"
Wolfgang Niedecken	Jokerman	1995	Recorded as "Dä Joker danz"
Wolfgang Niedecken	Absolutely Sweet Marie	1995	Recorded as "Wo bess du hück Naach, Marie?"
Wolfgang Niedecken	Seven Days	1995	Recorded as "Siebe Daach"
Wolfgang Niedecken	Leopard Skin Pillbox Hat	1995	Recorded as "Leopardfellhoot"
Wolfgang Niedecken	Highway 61 Revisited	1995	Recorded as "Nürburgring"
Wolfgang Niedecken	It's All Over Now, Baby Blue	1995	Recorded as "Jeder's manchmohl einsam, nit nur du"
Wolfgang Niedecken	Sara	1995	
Wolfgang Niedecken	Quinn the Eskimo (Mighty Quinn)	1995	Recorded as "Quinn, dä eskimo"
Wolfgang Niedecken	It Ain't Me, Babe	1995	Recorded as "Dat benn ich nit"
Wolfgang Niedecken	License to kill	1995	Recorded as "Nix andres em Kopp"
Wolfgang Niedecken	Just like a woman	1995	Recorded as "Als ob se'n Frau wöhr"
Wolfgang Niedecken	When I paint my masterpiece	1995	Recorded as "Meisterstöck"
Wolfgang Niedecken	Three Angels	1995	Recorded as"Drei Engel"
Willie Nile	The Times They Are a-Changin'	2017	
Willie Nile	Rainy Day Women ♯12 & 35	2017	
Willie Nile	Blowin' in the Wind	2017	
Willie Nile	A Hard Rain's a-Gonna Fall	2017	
Willie Nile	I Want You	2017	
Willie Nile	Subterranean Homesick Blues	2017	
Willie Nile	Love Minus Zero/No Limit	2017	
Willie Nile	Every Grain of Sand	2017	
Willie Nile	You Ain't Goin' Nowhere	2017	
Willie Nile	Abandoned Love	2017	
Harry Nilsson	Subterranean Homesick Blues	1974	
Nitty Gritty Dirt Band	Country Pie	2022	
Nitty Gritty Dirt Band	Don't Think Twice, It's All Right	2022	
Nitty Gritty Dirt Band	Forever Young	2022	
Nitty Gritty Dirt Band	Girl from the North Country	2022	
Nitty Gritty Dirt Band	I Shall Be Released	2022	
Nitty Gritty Dirt Band	It Takes a Lot to Laugh, It Takes a Train to Cry	2022	
Nitty Gritty Dirt Band	Quinn the Eskimo (The Mighty Quinn)	2022	
Nitty Gritty Dirt Band	She Belongs to Me	2022	
Nitty Gritty Dirt Band	The Times They Are A-Changin'	2022	
Nitty Gritty Dirt Band	Tonight I'll Be Staying Here with You	2022	
Nitty Gritty Dirt Band	You Ain't Goin' Nowhere	1991	
Larry Norman	When the Ship Comes In	2006	Recorded as "The Hour That the Ship Comes In"
Larry Norman	In the Garden	1998	
Larry Norman	Just Like a Woman	2018	
Larry Norman	Knockin' on Heaven's Door	2018	
Larry Norman	Like a Rolling Stone	1998	
Larry Norman	Positively 4th Street	2018	
Larry Norman	Queen Jane Approximately	2006	
Larry Norman	Father of Night	2006	Recorded as "Father of Day"
Larry Norman	The Sign on the Cross	2006	
Larry Norman	Visions of Johanna	2006	
Larry Norman	When He Returns	1998	
Tim O'Brien	Everything Is Broken	1996	
Tim O'Brien	Farewell, Angelina	1996	
Tim O'Brien	Father of Night	1996	
Tim O'Brien	Forever Young	1996	
Tim O'Brien	Lay Down Your Weary Tune	1996	
Tim O'Brien	Maggie's Farm	1996	
Tim O'Brien	Man Gave Names to All the Animals	1996	
Tim O'Brien	Masters of War	1996	
Tim O'Brien	Oxford Town	1996	
Tim O'Brien	Señor (Tales of Yankee Power)	1996	
Tim O'Brien	Subterranean Homesick Blues	1996	
Tim O'Brien	Tombstone Blues	1996	
Tim O'Brien	The Wicked Messenger	1996	
Sinéad O'Connor	I Believe in You	1993	
Sinéad O'Connor	Property of Jesus	2012	
Odetta	Baby, I'm in the Mood for You	1965	
Odetta	Blowin' in the Wind	1963	
Odetta	Don't Think Twice, It's All Right	1965	
Odetta	Long Ago, Far Away	1965	
Odetta	Long Time Gone	1965	
Odetta	Masters of War	1965	
Odetta	Mr. Tambourine Man	1965	
Odetta	Paths of Victory	1965	
Odetta	The Times They Are a-Changin'	1965	
Odetta	Tomorrow Is a Long Time	1965	
Odetta	Walkin' Down the Line	1965	
Odetta	With God on Our Side	1965	
The O'Jays	Emotionally Yours	1991	
Old Crow Medicine Show	4th Time Around	2017	
Old Crow Medicine Show	Absolutely Sweet Marie	2017	
Old Crow Medicine Show	I Want You	2017	
Old Crow Medicine Show	Just Like a Woman	2017	
Old Crow Medicine Show	Leopard-Skin Pill-Box Hat	2017	
Old Crow Medicine Show	Most Likely You Go Your Way and I'll Go Mine	2017	
Old Crow Medicine Show	Obviously 5 Believers	2017	
Old Crow Medicine Show	One of Us Must Know (Sooner or Later)	2017	
Old Crow Medicine Show	Pledging My Time	2017	
Old Crow Medicine Show	Rainy Day Women#12 & 35	2017	
Old Crow Medicine Show	Sad Eyed Lady of the Lowlands	2017	
Old Crow Medicine Show	Stuck Inside of Mobile with the Memphis Blues Again	2017	
Old Crow Medicine Show	Temporary Like Achilles	2017	
Old Crow Medicine Show	Visions of Johanna	2017	
Old Crow Medicine Show	Wagon Wheel	2004	Chorus by Dylan
Beth Orton	Buckets of Rain	2006	
Anders Osborne	Visions of Johanna	2003	
Joan Osborne	Buckets of Rain	2017	
Joan Osborne	Dark Eyes	2017	
Joan Osborne	High Water (For Charley Patton)	2017	
Joan Osborne	Highway 61 Revisited	2017	
Joan Osborne	Make You Feel My Love	2000	
Joan Osborne	Man in the Long Black Coat	1995	
Joan Osborne	Masters of War	2017	
Joan Osborne	Quinn the Eskimo (The Mighty Quinn)	2017	
Joan Osborne	Rainy Day Women#12 & 35	2017	
Joan Osborne	Ring Them Bells	2017	
Joan Osborne	Spanish Harlem Incident	2017	
Joan Osborne	Tangled Up in Blue	2017	
Joan Osborne	Tryin' to Get to Heaven	2017	
Joan Osborne	You Ain't Goin' Nowhere	2017	
Joan Osborne	You're Gonna Make Me Lonesome When You Go	2017	
Peter Ostroushko	Mozambique	2011	Co-written with Jacques Levy
Buck Owens	Love Minus Zero/No Limit	1971	
Pajama Club	She Belongs to Me	2012	
Robert Palmer	I'll Be Your Baby Tonight	1990	featuring UB40
Gene Parsons	You Ain't Goin' Nowhere	2001	
Ellis Paul	All Along the Watchtower	1994	
Pearl Jam	Masters of War	2004	
Pearl Jam	Forever Young	2006	
Pearls Before Swine	Oh, Sister	2004	
Bart Peeters	Tangled Up in Blue	2002	Recorded as "Prachtig In Het Blauw"
Bart Peeters	I Want You	2006	Recorded as "Ik Wil Je (Nooit Meer Kwijt)"
Carl Perkins	Champaign, Illinois	1969	Co-written with Carl Perkins
Elvis Perkins	Congratulations	2014	
Joe Perry	Man of Peace	2012	
The Persuasions	All Along the Watchtower	2010	
The Persuasions	Blowin' in the Wind	2010	
The Persuasions	Forever Young	2010	
The Persuasions	Just Like a Woman	2010	
The Persuasions	Knocking on Heaven's Door	2010	
The Persuasions	Lay Lady Lay	2010	
The Persuasions	Like a Rolling Stone	2010	
The Persuasions	Mr. Tambourine Man	2010	
The Persuasions	Positively 4th Street	2010	
The Persuasions	Quinn the Eskimo (The Mighty Quinn)	2010	
The Persuasions	Things Have Changed	2010	
The Persuasions	When I Paint My Masterpiece	2010	
The Persuasions	You Ain't Going Nowhere	2010	
Peter, Paul and Mary	Blowin' in the Wind	1963	
Peter, Paul and Mary	Bob Dylan's Dream	1967	
Peter, Paul and Mary	Don't Think Twice, It's All Right	1963	
Peter, Paul and Mary	I Shall Be Released	1968	
Peter, Paul and Mary	It Ain't Me Babe	1990	
Peter, Paul and Mary	Quit Your Low Down Ways	1963	
Peter, Paul and Mary	The Times They Are a-Changin'	1964	
Peter, Paul and Mary	Too Much of Nothing	1968	
Peter, Paul and Mary	When the Ship Comes In	1965	
Bernadette Peters	I'll Be Your Baby Tonight	1996	
Tom Petty	Everything Is Broken	1989	With Neil Young
Tom Petty	My Back Pages	1993	With George Harrison, Bob Dylan, Roger McGuinn, Eric Clapton and Neil Young
Tom Petty and the Heartbreakers	Jammin' Me	1987	Co-written with Tom Petty and Mike Campbell
Tom Petty and the Heartbreakers	License to Kill	1993	
Tom Petty and the Heartbreakers	Rainy Day Women ♯12 & 35	1993	
Madeleine Peyroux	You're Gonna Make Me Lonesome When You Go	2004	
Esther Phillips	Tonight I'll Be Staying Here with You	1969	
Phish	Quinn the Eskimo (The Mighty Quinn)	1999	
Phoenix	Sad Eyed Lady of the Lowlands	2010	
Planxty	I Pity the Poor Immigrant	1983	
Playing for Change	All Along the Watchtower	2018	
The Pogues	When the Ship Comes In	1996	
The Pozo Seco Singers	Tomorrow Is a Long Time	1966	
Elvis Presley	Blowin' in the Wind	1997	
Elvis Presley	Don't Think Twice, It's All Right	1973	
Elvis Presley	I Shall Be Released	1995	
Elvis Presley	Tomorrow Is a Long Time	1966	
Billy Preston	It's Alright, Ma (I'm Only Bleeding)	1973	
Billy Preston	She Belongs to Me	1969	
The Pretenders	Forever Young	1994	
Queens of the Stone Age	Outlaw Blues	2012	
Rage Against the Machine	Maggie's Farm	2000	
Bonnie Raitt	It's All Over Now, Baby Blue	2000	
Bonnie Raitt	Let's Keep It Between Us	1992	
Bonnie Raitt	Standing in the Doorway	2012	
The Ramones	My Back Pages	1993	
Red Hot Chili Peppers	Subterranean Homesick Blues	1987	
Redbird	Buckets of Rain	2005	
Noel Redding	She Belongs to Me	2003	
RedOne	Knockin' on Heaven's Door	2012	
Lou Reed	Foot of Pride	1993	
Terry Reid	Highway 61 Revisited	2004	
John Renbourn and Wizz Jones	Buckets of Rain	2016	
Tony Rice	Farewell	1984	
Tony Rice	Girl from the North Country	1993	
Cliff Richard	Blowin' in the Wind	1966	
Turley Richards	Love Minus Zero/No Limit	1970	
Turley Richards	It's All Over Now, Baby Blue	1971	
Turley Richards	One Too Many Mornings	1970	
Stan Ridgway	As I Went Out One Morning	1996	
Rise Against	Ballad of Hollis Brown	2012	
Johnny Rivers	Blowin' in the Wind	1965	
Johnny Rivers	Mr. Tambourine Man	1965	
Johnny Rivers	Positively 4th Street	1968	
Roark	Mr. Tambourine Man	2005	
Duke Robillard	Pledging My Time	2003	
Suzzy & Maggie Roche	Clothes Line Saga	2001	
Rock 'n' Roll Soldiers	Rainy Day Women Nos. 12 & 35	2005	
Ed Roland and the Sweet Tea Project	Shelter from the Storm	2012	
The Rolling Stones	Like a Rolling Stone	1995	
Mick Ronson	Like a Rolling Stone	1994	vocals by David Bowie
Linda Ronstadt	Baby, You've Been on My Mind	1969	
Linda Ronstadt	I'll Be Your Baby Tonight	1969	
Linda Ronstadt	Just Like Tom Thumb's Blues	1998	
The Roots	Masters of War	2007	
Michael Rose	The Lonesome Death of Hattie Carroll	2004	
Tony Rose	Boots of Spanish Leather	1982	
Diana Ross	Forever Young	1984	
Todd Rundgren	Most Likely You Go Your Way and I'll Go Mine	1976	
Leon Russell	A Hard Rain's a-Gonna Fall	1971	
Leon Russell	It's All Over Now, Baby Blue	1995	
Leon Russell	Love Minus Zero/No Limit	1995	
Leon Russell	Masters of War	1970	
Leon Russell	She Belongs to Me	1995	
Leon Russell	Watching the River Flow	1999	
Mitch Ryder	Like a Rolling Stone	1985	
Raphael Saadiq	Leopard-Skin Pill-Box Hat	2012	
Doug Sahm	Wallflower	1973	
David Sanborn	Knockin' on Heaven's Door	1989	
Ximena Sariñana	I Want You	2012	
Say Anything	The Man in Me	2006	
Boz Scaggs	Girl from the North Country	1965	
Danny Schmidt	Buckets of Rain	2011	
Freddie Scott	I Shall Be Released	1970	
Earl Scruggs	Blowin' in the Wind	1967	
Earl Scruggs	Don't Think Twice, It's All Right	1967	
Earl Scruggs	Down in the Flood	1967	
Earl Scruggs	I Shall Be Released	1973	
Earl Scruggs	It Ain't Me Babe	1967	
Earl Scruggs	Like a Rolling Stone	1968	
Earl Scruggs	Mr. Tambourine Man	1967	
Earl Scruggs	Rainy Day Women ♯12 & 35	1995	
Earl Scruggs	The Times They Are a-Changin'	1968	
Earl Scruggs	Tomorrow Is a Long Time	1976	
Earl Scruggs	You Ain't Goin' Nowhere	1971	
The Searchers	Blowin' in the Wind	1992	
The Searchers	Coming from the Heart	1979	
Seatrain	Watching the River Flow	1973	
Pete Seeger	Blowin' in the Wind	1965	
Pete Seeger	Farewell	1989	
Pete Seeger	Forever Young	2012	
Pete Seeger	A Hard Rain's a-Gonna Fall	1965	
Pete Seeger	Masters of War	1965	
Pete Seeger	Paths of Victory	1965	
Pete Seeger	Walkin' Down the Line	1975	With Arlo Guthrie
Pete Seeger	Who Killed Davey Moore?	1963	
The Seekers	Blowin' in the Wind	1964	
The Seekers	Don't Think Twice, It's All Right	1965	
The Seekers	The Times They Are a-Changin'	1965	
The Seldom Scene	Boots of Spanish Leather	1983	
The Seldom Scene	Tomorrow Is a Long Time	2007	
The Selecter	Rainy Day Women ♯12 & 35	1995	
Selig	Knockin' on Heaven's Door	1997	
Bettie Serveert	I'll Keep It with Mine	1996	
Louise Setara	Make You Feel My Love	2006	
William Shatner	Mr. Tambourine Man	1968	
Kenny Wayne Shepherd	Everything Is Broken	1997	
Bobby Sherman	One Too Many Mornings	1969	
Richard Shindell	She Belongs to Me	1994	
Show of Hands	Farewell, Angelina	1997	
Show of Hands	Is Your Love in Vain?	2000	
Ben Sidran	All I Really Want to Do	2009	
Ben Sidran	Ballad of a Thin Man	2009	
Ben Sidran	Blowin' in the Wind	2009	
Ben Sidran	Everything Is Broken	2009	
Ben Sidran	Gotta Serve Somebody	2009	
Ben Sidran	Highway 61 Revisited	2009	
Ben Sidran	Knockin' on Heaven's Door	2009	
Ben Sidran	Maggie's Farm	2009	
Ben Sidran	On the Road Again	2009	
Ben Sidran	Rainy Day Women ♯12 & 35	2009	
Ben Sidran	Subterranean Homesick Blues	2009	
Ben Sidran	Tangled Up in Blue	2009	
The Silkie	Black Crow Blues	1965	
The Silkie	Blowin' in the Wind	1965	
The Silkie	Bob Dylan's Dream	1965	
The Silkie	Boots of Spanish Leather	1965	
The Silkie	Girl from the North Country	1965	
The Silkie	It Ain't Me Babe	1965	
The Silkie	Long Time Gone	1965	
The Silkie	Love Minus Zero/No Limit	1965	
The Silkie	Mr. Tambourine Man	1965	
The Silkie	The Times They Are A-Changin'	1965	
The Silkie	Tomorrow Is a Long Time	1965	
The Silkie	When the Ship Comes In	1965	
Silversun Pickups	Not Dark Yet	2012	
Carly Simon	The Times They Are a-Changin'	1979	
Carly Simon	Just Like a Woman	2012	
Simon & Garfunkel	The Times They Are a-Changin'	1964	
Nina Simone	The Ballad of Hollis Brown	1966	
Nina Simone	I Shall Be Released	1968	
Nina Simone	Just Like a Woman	1971	
Nina Simone	Just Like Tom Thumb's Blues	1969	
Nina Simone	The Times They Are a-Changin'	1969	
Simply Red	Positively 4th Street	2003	
Martin Simpson	Boots of Spanish Leather	2001	
Martin Simpson	Don't Think Twice It's Alright	2026	
Martin Simpson	Masters of War	1983	
Nancy Sinatra	It Ain't Me Babe	1966	
Nancy Sinatra	Like a Rolling Stone	1998	
Siouxsie and the Banshees	This Wheel's on Fire	1987	Co-written with Rick Danko
Patrick Sky	Blowin' in the Wind	1985	
Patrick Sky	Don't Think Twice, It's All Right	1985	
Patti Smith	A Hard Rain's a-Gonna Fall	2016	
Patti Smith	Changing of the Guards	2007	
Patti Smith	Drifter's Escape	2012	
Patti Smith	The Wicked Messenger	1996	
Chris Smither	Desolation Row	2003	
Chris Smither	It Takes a Lot to Laugh, It Takes a Train to Cry	2009	
Chris Smither	Visions of Johanna	2006	
Smokie	Mr. Tambourine Man	2001	
Phoebe Snow	I Believe in You	1981	
Socratic	Tonight I'll Be Staying Here with You	2005	
Something Corporate	Just Like a Woman	2005	
Sonic Youth	I'm Not There	2007	
Rosalie Sorrels	Tomorrow Is a Long Time	2001	
Soweto Gospel Choir	Forever Young	2007	
Soweto Gospel Choir	I'll Remember You	2007	
The Specials	Maggie's Farm	1980	
Spirit	All Along the Watchtower	1977	
Spirit	Like a Rolling Stone	1975	
Spirit	Positively 4th Street	2007	
Spirit	The Times They Are a-Changin'	1975	
Spooky Tooth	Too Much of Nothing	1968	
Bruce Springsteen	Chimes of Freedom	1988	
Bruce Springsteen	I Want You	1975	
Staple Singers	A Hard Rain's a-Gonna Fall	1964	
Staple Singers	Masters of War	1964	
Mavis Staples	Gotta Serve Somebody	1999	
State Radio	John Brown	2012	
Steel Train	Don't Think Twice, It's Alright	2005	
Steel Train	I Shall Be Released	2005	
Ray Stevens	I'll Be Your Baby Tonight	1969	
Ray Stevens	She Belongs to Me	1970	
Sufjan Stevens	Ring Them Bells	2007	
Al Stewart	I Don't Believe You (She Acts Like We Never Have Met)	1972	
Rod Stewart	Girl from the North Country	1974	
Rod Stewart	The Groom's Still Waiting at the Altar	2009	
Rod Stewart	If Not for You	2006	
Rod Stewart	Just Like a Woman	1981	
Rod Stewart	Mama, You Been on My Mind	1972	
Rod Stewart	Only a Hobo	1970	
Rod Stewart	Tomorrow Is a Long Time	1971	
Stephen Stills	Ballad of Hollis Brown	1991	
Stephen Stills and Judy Collins	Girl from the North Country	2017	
Stephen Stills and Al Kooper	It Takes a Lot to Laugh, It Takes a Train to Cry	1968	
Sting	Girl from the North Country	2012	
Storyhill	Lay Down Your Weary Tune	2011	
Billy Strange	All I Really Want to Do	1965	
Billy Strange	Blowin' in the Wind	1963	
Billy Strange	Don't Think Twice, It's All Right	1966	
Billy Strange	It Ain't Me Babe	1965	
Billy Strange	Like a Rolling Stone	1965	
Billy Strange	Mr. Tambourine Man	1965	
Straylight Run	With God on Our Side	2005	
S.T.S.	Mr. Tambourine Man	2002	Recorded as "He, alter Liedersänger"
Sugarland	Tonight I'll Be Staying Here with You	2012	
Emma Swift	Going Going Gone	2020	
Emma Swift	I Contain Multitudes	2020	
Emma Swift	The Man in Me	2020	
Emma Swift	One of Us Must Know (Sooner or Later)	2020	
Emma Swift	Queen Jane Approximately	2020	
Emma Swift	Sad Eyed Lady of the Lowlands	2020	
Emma Swift	Simple Twist of Fate	2020	
Emma Swift	You're a Big Girl Now	2020	
Zita Swoon	You're a Big Girl Now	2004	
Zita Swoon	Series of Dreams	2007	
June Tabor	All Along the Watchtower	1998	
June Tabor	Don't Think Twice, It's All Right	1993	
June Tabor	This Wheel's on Fire	1990	Co-written with Rick Danko
Russ Taff	I Believe in You	2011	
Howard Tate	Girl from the North Country	1972	
James Taylor	The Times They Are a-Changin'	1979	
Roger Taylor	Masters of War	1984	
Tea Leaf Green	Waiting to Get Beat	2014	
Susan Tedeschi	Lord Protect My Child	2005	
Susan Tedeschi	Don't Think Twice, It's Alright	2002	
Television	Knockin' on Heaven's Door	1982	
Texas Tornados	To Ramona	1992	
Them	It's All Over Now, Baby Blue	1966	
Third Day	Saved	2000	
George Thorogood & the Destroyers	Wanted Man	1982	
George Thorogood & the Destroyers	Drifter's Escape	2006	
Thunderclap Newman	Open the Door, Homer	1969	
Johnny Thunders	Joey	2002	
Johnny Tillotson	Blowin' in the Wind	1963	
Tom Tom Club	She Belongs to Me	1988	
Frank Tovey	North Country Blues	1989	
Happy Traum	Buckets of Rain	1977	
Happy Traum	Tonight I'll Be Staying Here with You	2005	
Tremeloes	I Shall Be Released	1968	
Triggerfinger	Ballad of a Thin Man	2012	
Triggerfinger	Love Sick		
Walter Trout	Girl from the North Country	1991	
Walter Trout	Leopard-Skin Pill-Box Hat	2003	
T.S.O.L.	All Along the Watchtower	1988	
Gil Turner	Blowin' in the Wind		
Ike & Tina Turner	She Belongs to Me	1993	Recorded as "He Belongs to Me"
Turtle Island String Quartet	All Along the Watchtower	2010	
The Turtles	It Ain't Me Babe	1965	
The Turtles	Like a Rolling Stone	1965	
The Turtles	Love Minus Zero/No Limit	1965	
Jeff Tweedy	Simple Twist of Fate	2007	
U2	Love Rescue Me	1988	Co-written with Bono and U2
UB40	I'll Be Your Baby Tonight	1990	with Robert Palmer
Dave Van Ronk	Buckets of Rain	2004	
Dave Van Ronk	If I Had to Do It All Over Again, I'd Do It All Over You	1963	
Dave Van Ronk	Man on the Street	1966	Recorded as "The Old Man "
Dave Van Ronk	Song to Woody	1980	
Dave Van Ronk	Subterranean Homesick Blues	1994	
Townes Van Zandt	Rambling, Gambling Willie	1994	Recorded as Little Willie the Gambler
Townes Van Zandt	Man Gave Names to All the Animals	1994	
Eddie Vedder	Girl from the North Country	2011	
Eddie Vedder	Masters of War	2006	
Eddie Vedder	The Times They Are A-Changin'	1993	
Eddie Vedder & The Million Dollar Bashers	All Along the Watchtower	2007	
Nacho Vegas	Simple Twist of Fate	2011	Adaptation in Spanish as Un simple giro del destino
Martha Velez	It Takes a Lot to Laugh, It Takes a Train to Cry	2007	
Caetano Veloso	Jokerman	1992	
Caetano Veloso	It's Alright, Ma (I'm Only Bleeding)	2004	
The Ventures	Quinn the Eskimo (The Mighty Quinn)	1968	
Tom Verlaine & The Million Dollar Bashers	Cold Irons Bound	2007	
Village Stompers	Blowin' in the Wind	1963	
Village Stompers	Don't Think Twice, It's All Right	1964	
The Waifs	Don't Think Twice, It's All Right	2005	
Jerry Jeff Walker	Don't Think Twice, It's All Right	1982	
Jerry Jeff Walker	One Too Many Mornings	1977	
Joe Louis Walker	Stuck Inside of Mobile with the Memphis Blues Again	2003	
Jennifer Warnes	Just Like Tom Thumb's Blues	1969	
Jennifer Warnes	Sign on the Window	1979	
Dionne Warwick	Blowin' in the Wind	1966	
The Waterboys	Death Is Not the End	1988	
The Waterboys	Girl from the North Country	2002	
Roger Waters	Knockin' on Heaven's Door	2002	
Doc Watson	You Ain't Going Nowhere	2002	With Frosty Morn
Doc and Merle Watson	Don't Think Twice, It's All Right	1978	
Reggie Watts	Brownsville Girl	2014	
We Are Augustines	Mama, You Been on My Mind	2012	
We Five	Tomorrow Is a Long Time	1970	
Paul Weller	All Along the Watchtower	2004	
Paul Weller	I Shall Be Released	1996	
Kitty Wells	Forever Young	1974	
West Coast Pop Art Experimental Band	It's All Over Now, Baby Blue	1980	
West Coast Pop Art Experimental Band	She Belongs to Me	1966	
A Whisper in the Noise	The Times They Are A-Changin'	2006	
The White Stripes	Love Sick	2013	
The White Stripes	One More Cup of Coffee	1999	
The White Stripes	Outlaw Blues	2004	
The Whitlams	Tangled Up in Blue	1997	
Chris Whitley	4th Time Around	2000	
Wilco & Fleet Foxes	I Shall Be Released	2014	
Hank Williams Jr.	I'll Be Your Baby Tonight	1992	
Lucinda Williams	Positively 4th Street	1994	
Lucinda Williams	Tryin' to Get to Heaven	2012	
Marion Williams	I Pity the Poor Immigrant	1971	
Marion Williams	I Shall Be Released	1971	
Marion Williams	The Wicked Messenger	1971	
Robin and Linda Williams	Walkin' Down the Line	2011	
Robin Williamson	Absolutely Sweet Marie	2008	
Cassandra Wilson	Lay Lady Lay	2003	
Cassandra Wilson	Shelter from the Storm	2002	
Chris Wilson	It Takes a Lot to Laugh, It Takes a Train to Cry	1994	
Charlie Winston	This Wheel's on Fire	2012	
Winter Hours	All Along the Watchtower	1986	
Johnny Winter	From a Buick 6	1973	
Johnny Winter	Highway 61 Revisited	1969	
Johnny Winter	Like a Rolling Stone	1980	
Wizex	It's All Over Now, Baby Blue	1980	
Bobby Womack	All Along the Watchtower	1973	
Stevie Wonder	Blowin' in the Wind	1966	
Stevie Wonder	Mr. Tambourine Man	1966	
Evan Rachel Wood	I'd Have You Anytime	2012	
Ronnie Wood	Seven Days	1979	
The Wood Brothers	Buckets of Rain	2008	
World Party	All I Really Want to Do	1986	
XTC	All Along the Watchtower	1978	
Glenn Yarbrough	Tomorrow Is a Long Time	1967	
The Yardbirds	Most Likely You Go Your Way and I'll Go Mine	1991	
Trisha Yearwood	Make You Feel My Love	1998	
Yellowbirds	Series of Dreams	2014	
Yellowman	The Ballad of Frankie Lee and Judas Priest	2005	
Yes	Lay Lady Lay	2003	
Yes	One Too Many Mornings	2003	
Yes	Well Well Well	2003	Co-written with Danny O'Keefe
Yo La Tengo	4th Time Around	2007	
Yo La Tengo	I Threw It All Away	1993	
Yo La Tengo	I Wanna Be Your Lover	2007	
Neil Young	All Along the Watchtower	2000	
Neil Young	Blowin' in the Wind	1991	With Crazy Horse
Neil Young	Everything Is Broken	2023	With Tom Petty
Neil Young	Forever Young	2017	With and without the Grateful Dead
Neil Young	Just Like Tom Thumb's Blues	2019	
Young@Heart	Forever Young	2007	
The Youngbloods	I Shall Be Released	1972	
Sophie Zelmani	Most of the Time	2003	
Warren Zevon	Knockin' on Heaven's Door	2003	

== See also ==
- List of songs written by Bob Dylan
