= Bucklew =

Bucklew is a surname. Notable people with the surname include:

- Phil H. Bucklew (1914–1992), American football player and United States Navy officer
- Susan C. Bucklew (born 1942), American lawyer, judge, and teacher
- Wendy Bucklew, American rock singer-songwriter
