= John Wesley Harding (disambiguation) =

John Wesley Harding is a 1967 Bob Dylan album.

John Wesley Harding may also refer to:

- "John Wesley Harding" (song), the title track of the Dylan album
- John Wesley Harding (singer) (born 1965), English singer
- John Wesley Harding, a cover of the Dylan album by Thea Gilmore

== See also ==
- John Wesley Hardin (1853–1895), American gun-fighter
