= I Dreamed I Saw St. Augustine =

Song by Bob Dylan

from the album John Wesley Harding
- Released: December 27, 1967
- Recorded: October 17, 1967
- Studio: Columbia Studio A (Nashville, Tennessee)
- Genre: Folk rock
- Length: 3:53
- Label: Columbia
- Songwriter: Bob Dylan
- Producer: Bob Johnston

"I Dreamed I Saw St. Augustine" is a song by Bob Dylan that was originally released on his 1967 album John Wesley Harding. It was recorded at the first John Wesley Harding session on October 17, 1967. It has been covered by many artists, including Joan Baez on her all-Dylan album Any Day Now, as well as by Vic Chesnutt, Eric Clapton, John Doe, Thea Gilmore, Adam Selzer and Dirty Projectors. In addition, Jimi Hendrix at one point intended to cover this song, but felt it was too personal to Dylan and instead covered a different song from the album, "All Along the Watchtower".

"I Dreamed I Saw St. Augustine" is a pensive ballad. Like the rest of the John Wesley Harding album, the music of "I Dreamed I Saw St. Augustine" uses spare, unobtrusive musical accompaniment. The primary instruments are an acoustic guitar and drums. The lyrics describe a dream that is enigmatic and subject to interpretation. However, the lyrics do convey a deeply felt sense of guilt, as well as a vision of faith, righteousness, fear and betrayal. The sense of guilt is particularly prevalent in the final verse:

I dreamed I saw St. Augustine
Alive, with fiery breath
And I dreamed I was amongst the ones that put him out to death
Oh, I awoke in anger, so alone and terrified
I put my fingers against the glass
And bowed my head and cried

The opening couplet of the song paraphrases the song "Joe Hill" by Alfred Hayes and Earl Robinson, which begins with the lines "I dreamed I saw Joe Hill last night / Alive as you or me." "Joe Hill" was a folk song written as a tribute to the union organizer Joe Hill, who was viewed by supporters as a martyr after he was convicted of a motiveless murder based on weak evidence. The reference is ironic, since the song seems to deny the existence of modern martyrs to lead humanity towards salvation.

The St. Augustine in the title has often been linked to St. Augustine of Hippo, although St. Augustine of Hippo was not martyred, but died shortly before the Vandal sack of Hippo. He was, however, a philosopher who wrote about evil and guilt, he defined the concept of original sin and therefore mankind's ultimate guilt, and could have viewed himself as being martyred in the sense of being killed by his own sins. “Bis orat qui bene cantat”, "He who sings well, prays twice", which has been attributed often to St Augustine, would have been known to Bob Dylan. In the dream revealed in the song, St. Augustine wears a coat of solid gold, which may signify either the worldly excesses of mankind and the Catholic Church or St. Augustine's own spiritual wealth. He also carries a blanket, which may be a sign of asceticism or of his compassion. St. Augustine searches for "the very souls / Whom already have been sold," a reference to the commercialization of mankind's inner self, a motif that will recur on later songs on the album such as "Dear Landlord" and "The Ballad of Frankie Lee and Judas Priest". He tells "ye gifted kings and queens" that "No martyr is among ye now," but consoles them with the knowledge that nonetheless they are not alone. But the dream ends with the narrator realizing that he himself is among those that put St. Augustine to death, initiating his feelings of guilt as he now sees the error of his ways. One interpretation of the song is that St. Augustine is a stand-in for Dylan himself, who had been viewed as a prophet or messiah, was nearly "martyred" in a motorcycle accident a few months before the song was written, but in any case had come too late since mankind (including himself) had already sold its soul to many temptations. Another possible interpretation is that Dylan sees himself as being among those who "put Him out to death," a reference to responsibility for the death of Jesus, the ultimate expression of personal guilt.

One analysis of the song, primarily cited by American Dylan scholar Anthony Lewis (not to be confused with American author Anthony Lewis), links the lyrics to John Milton's Methought I Saw my Late Espoused Saint. Often chronicled as Milton's 23rd sonnet, the poem tells the story of a man whose late wife came to him in a dream, only to be pulled away by the arrival of morning. The similarities between "in a voice without restraint" (Dylan) and "in Heaven without restraint" (Milton), "Oh I awoke in anger, so alone and terrified; I put my fingers against the glass and bowed my head and cried" (Dylan) and "But Oh! as to embrace me she inclin'd, I wak'd, she fled, and day brought back my night" (Milton), and the title of the works themselves have given rise to this comparison.

In a 2005 poll of artists published by Mojo, "I Dreamed I Saw St. Augustine" was listed as the #76 greatest Bob Dylan song of all time.

Dylan played the song live, in a slow waltz arrangement, at the Isle of Wight Festival in 1969, a performance included on Isle of Wight Live, part of the 4-CD deluxe edition of The Bootleg Series Vol. 10: Another Self Portrait (1969–1971). He also played the song live on the Rolling Thunder Revue in the 1970s, as may be heard on the box set The Rolling Thunder Revue: The 1975 Live Recordings, and with the Heartbreakers in the 1980s, but has rarely performed the song live since.
