= A Nod to Bob: An Artists' Tribute to Bob Dylan on His 60th Birthday =

A Nod to Bob

Studio album by Various artists
- Released: May 8, 2001
- Recorded: Dec 2000 – January 6, 2001
- Genre: country, folk, singer-songwriter
- Label: Red House
- Producer: Bob Feldman, Eric Peltoniemi, Ben Wittman, etc.

Professional ratings
Review scores
Source	Rating
Acoustic Guitar	favorable
Allmusic	4/5 stars
Country Music International	favorable
Dirty Linen	favorable
fRoots	favorable
Fresh Air	unfavorable
The Gazette	favorable
PopMatters	favorable
Relix	favorable/brief
Rock & Rap Confidential	favorable
Sing Out!	favorable
Sound & Vision	music: recording:
Vintage Guitar	favorable

A Nod to Bob: An Artists' Tribute to Bob Dylan on His 60th Birthday is a 2001 tribute to Bob Dylan by artists on the Red House Records label. Red House is a folk-oriented label from Dylan's home state of Minnesota. The songs selected are almost entirely from the early phase of Dylan's career.

== Track listing ==
All songs written by Bob Dylan.

No.	Title	Artist	Length
1.	"Love Minus Zero/No Limit"	Eliza Gilkyson	3:53
2.	"Sweetheart Like You"	Guy Davis	5:16
3.	"Clothes Line Saga"	Suzzy & Maggie Roche	3:15
4.	"Girl of the North Country"	John Gorka	3:29
5.	"Delia"	Spider John Koerner & Dave Ray	2:43
6.	"I Want You"	Cliff Eberhardt	5:12
7.	"All Along the Watchtower"	Tom Landa & The Paperboys	4:23
8.	"Dieu À Nos Côtés (With God On Our Side)"	Hart-Rouge	4:09
9.	"Boots of Spanish Leather"	Martin Simpson	6:16
10.	"Restless Farewell"	Norman Blake & Peter Ostroushko	5:35
11.	"It Ain't Me, Babe"	Lucy Kaplansky	4:21
12.	"Pledging My Time"	Greg Brown	3:44
13.	"Tomorrow Is a Long Time"	Rosalie Sorrels	4:54
14.	"Intro to Don't Think Twice..."	Ramblin' Jack Elliot	1:48
15.	"Don't Think Twice, It's All Right"	Ramblin' Jack Elliot	4:04

"All Along the Watchtower" was remixed in 2002 and released on The Paperboys' greatest hits album Tenure.

== Charts ==
year	chart	peak
2001	Billboard Top Independent Albums	22

== See also ==
- List of songs written by Bob Dylan
- List of artists who have covered Bob Dylan songs
