= Drifter's Escape =

- West German picture sleeve

Single by Bob Dylan

from the album John Wesley Harding
- A-side: "I Threw It All Away"
- B-side: "John Wesley Harding" "All Along the Watchtower"
- Released: March 15, 1968 (with B-side "John Wesley Harding"); March 21, 1968 (with B-side "All Along the Watchtower")
- Recorded: October 17, 1967
- Studio: Columbia Studio A (Nashville, Tennessee)
- Genre: Folk rock
- Length: 2:52
- Label: Columbia
- Songwriter: Bob Dylan
- Producer: Bob Johnston

Bob Dylan singles chronology
"If You Gotta Go, Go Now" (1967)	"Drifter's Escape" (1968)	"All Along the Watchtower" (1968)

"Drifter's Escape" is a song written by Bob Dylan that he recorded for his 1967 album John Wesley Harding. Columbia Records released it as a single in the US and the UK in 1969 as the B-side to "I Threw It All Away". The song was recorded in four takes on October 17, 1967. CBS Records International also issued the song as a single in 1968 paired with "John Wesley Harding" in the Netherlands, Germany, and Scandinavia and All Along the Watchtower in Italy.

== Lyrical interpretation ==
Dylan wrote "Drifter's Escape" on a train in New York while traveling to the first session for the John Wesley Harding album. The lyrics provide a Kafka-esque narrative in which an outsider is oppressed by society, but not defeated. The protagonist is put on trial without knowing what the charges against him are. The judge is sympathetic, but powerless. The jury finds the protagonist guilty, but he is saved through divine intervention when the courthouse is struck by lightning. The protagonist is able to escape as his persecutors fall to their knees in prayer. Dylan leaves the orientation of the protagonist and the deus ex machina ambiguous. The protagonist could be a prophet freed by God, or he could be a false prophet freed by the devil.

Several commentators have pointed to parallels between the song's story and Dylan's own experiences around the time he wrote the song. The drifter does not understand the charges against him, just as Dylan did not understand the criticism he received for moving from folk music to rock music. The jury "cried for more", just as Dylan's fans who followed his path to rock music became more oppressive. And the lightning bolt that allows the drifter to escape could be a metaphor for the "motorcycle accident" Dylan suffered in 1966. Another theme that comes through in the song is Dylan's hatred for mob violence.

Biographer Clinton Heylin has noted that in writing "Drifter's Escape", Dylan found a new, economical style that allowed him to tell a five-act story in just three verses. He then went on to write more songs in a similar manner, which formed the bulk of the John Wesley Harding album.

== Live performances ==
Dylan did not perform "Drifter's Escape" live for almost 25 years after it was written and released. He first performed it live in Oregon on April 30, 1992, a day after the Rodney King verdict. He sang it again four days later in San Francisco, at which point the lines "The trial was bad enough/ But this was ten times worse" had particular resonance with those who considered that verdict unjust. Since then, Dylan has performed the song occasionally on the Never Ending Tour. In 1992, he used two different live arrangements: one similar to the arrangement on John Wesley Harding and one influenced by Jimi Hendrix's version. He also performed it as the show opener in several 1995 concerts. It returned to his live set again in 2001, this time in an energetic performance driven by Dylan's "paranoia-inflected vocals".

== Other recordings ==
"Drifter's Escape" has been recorded by several other artists, including Joan Baez, Billy Strings, Jimi Hendrix, and Patti Smith. Baez covered the song in 1968 on her album Any Day Now. Hendrix' version was recorded in 1970 and appeared on Loose Ends in 1974, Stone Free in 1981 and South Saturn Delta in 1997. Author David Stubbs noted that Hendrix didn't transform this song the way he did "All Along the Watchtower," but that Hendrix' guitar provides "a chorus of 'amens' and 'hallelujahs' throughout the song." George Thorogood recorded the song for his 2006 album The Hard Stuff.
