= Tammy Susan Hurt =

American music producer

Tammy Hurt
- Occupations: Creative industries executive, Emmy-nominated TV producer, Drummer, Georgia Music Partners co-founder
- Years active: 1987–present
- Website: www.tammyhurt.com

Tammy Hurt is an American music executive, drummer, producer, and music advocate. Hurt's music project, Sonic Rebel, was featured as the cover story for the June 2021 print and digital edition of Atlanta's Creative Loafing. She is also known for her work with the Recording Academy.

== Early life and music career ==
She attended Joseph Wheeler High School in Marietta, Georgia and played drums in every type of band – marching band, concert band, symphonic band, jazz band and many garage bands. Hurt pursued a B.A. in Business Administration at Presbyterian College. Hurt began playing drums professionally at age 14. Among her credits, she has recorded and performed live with the GRAMMY-winning group Indigo Girls, GRAMMY-winning producer Brendan O'Brien and GRAMMY-winning producer Nick DiDia. Her past musical projects include Paper Dolls, She Said, Minority Rules, and Superchick. Hurt has also recorded with Indigo Girls, Wendy Bucklew and Angela Motter.

In July 2020, Hurt launched Sonic Rebel Music, by debuting the release of “Run,” the first track from the five-song debut EP, “We Made This With Our Hands.” "Run" debuted exclusively on Twitch during a special Fortnite in-game activation. She worked with Dan Gleason and Ben Homola of Grouplove, recording engineer TJ Elias and multi-instrumentalist Kevin Spencer. Hurt and Elias launched Sonic Rebel when he was programming for electronic music duo Thievery Corporation.

== Business career ==
Hurt is the managing partner of Placement Music, a boutique entertainment firm specializing in custom music, scoring and licensing for all media platforms. Placement Music highlights include being commissioned by FOX Sports for a second consecutive Super Bowl broadcast to create original full orchestral score. Her additional credits include Paramount Pictures, CBS, MTV, HBO, BET, Sony, Lifetime, Hallmark, NFL, NASCAR, “True Blood,” “Dexter,” “Drop Dead Diva,” “Mean Girls 2”, and multiple custom placements in the indie film “HITS” which debuted at the Sundance Film Festival. Hurt is a recipient of Catalyst Magazine’s Top 25 Entrepreneurs and Ones to Watch Award.

In 2017, Tammy led the campaign that successfully passed the state of Georgia’s first standalone music tax incentive, the Georgia Music Investment Act, which Georgia Governor Brian Kemp commended for its impact on the music industry throughout the United States. She continues her advocacy efforts today as a member of the Georgia Film, Music & Digital Entertainment Commission.

In April 2021, Tammy was invited to give a TED Talk for TEDxAtlanta. Her speech was called "Music is the Great Unifier," in which she discussed her belief in the power of music to bring humanity together regardless of race, politics or religion.

In August 2023, Tammy was named one of Atlanta's Most Admired CEOs by the Atlanta Business Chronicle for "defining leadership" in Atlanta.

=== Recording Academy ===
Hurt served on the local Board of the Recording Academy’s Atlanta Chapter for 14 years. She served as Atlanta Chapter President, National Trustee and Vice Chair of the Board of Trustees. On June 3, 2021, The Recording Academy elected Hurt as the Chair of the National Board of Trustees. She was elected to serve as Chair of the Board for a second term, beginning June 1, 2023. She is the first openly LGBTQ+ Officer of the Academy.

In January 2024, Tammy co-hosted The Grammy Museum to celebrate the unveiling of its Ray Charles Terrace with a ribbon-cutting ceremony.

== Georgia Music Investment Act ==
A co-founder of the nonprofit organization, Georgia Music Partners (GMP), Hurt spearheaded the campaign to create and pass Georgia’s first standalone music tax incentive, the Georgia Music Investment Act. It was a seven-year effort for which she was commended by Georgia Governor Brian Kemp. S

== Selected discography ==
- Paper Dolls, Paper Dolls (1987) - drums, percussion
- Wendy Bucklew, Painting Sidewalks (1993) - drums
- Indigo Girls, "Forever Dusty" (2000) - drums, percussion
- Angela Motter, Outta Control (2005) - drums
- Steve Dancz, Declaration Anthem (2011) - producer
- Steve Dancz, Heart of Independence (2014) - producer
- Sonic Rebel, "Run" (2020) - drums, producer, artist
- Sonic Rebel, "Reign" (2020) - drums, producer, artist
- Sonic Rebel, "This Vibe" (2021) - drums, producer, artist
- Sonic Rebel, "This Groove" (2024) - drums, producer, artist
- DJ Willy Wow, "Hip Hope For Kids" (2024 - GRAMMY Nominated) - drums
- Sonic Rebel, "The Mixtape" (2024) - drums, producer, artist
