= Any Day Now (Joan Baez album) =

Studio album by Joan Baez
- Released: December 1968
- Recorded: September 1968
- Studio: Columbia (Nashville, Tennessee)
- Genre: Folk
- Length: 65:28
- Label: Vanguard VSD-79306/7
- Producer: Maynard Solomon

Joan Baez chronology
Baptism: A Journey Through Our Time (1968)	Any Day Now (1968)	David's Album (1969)

Any Day Now is the ninth studio album by Joan Baez, released as double LP in 1968 and made up of Bob Dylan songs. It peaked at number 30 on the Billboard Pop Albums chart.

== History ==
At the time of the album's original release, six of the songs had not been included on official Dylan releases. One song, "Love is Just a Four-Letter Word," has apparently never been recorded by Dylan himself. The album was produced during a marathon recording session in Nashville in September 1968, the fruits of which resulted in two albums: Any Day Now, and 1969's David's Album. Baez would return to Nashville to record a number of times during the next several years.

Laying Bob Dylan sheet music on the floor in front of her, Baez closed her eyes and picked at random, the results of which made up the track listing.

Joan Baez did illustrations for each of the songs, included in the gatefold of the album.

The record went gold in 1969.

The Vanguard reissue contains two bonus tracks: "Blowin' in the Wind" and "It Ain't Me Babe," both live performances from Baez' 1967 tour of Japan.

== Reception ==
Professional ratings
Review scores
Source	Rating
AllMusic	4.5/5 stars
Rolling Stone	(positive)

In his AllMusic review, music critic Thom Jurek wrote of the album, "Her empathy for the material, her keen understanding of Dylan's sound world, and her own glorious voice brought another dimension to these 16 songs and, if anything, extended their meanings. There is no greater interpreter of Dylan's music, and while evidence of that certainly was offered on earlier recordings (such as 1967's Joan), the verdict was solidified here... The bottom line is that Any Day Now, like Joan and David's Album, found Baez at an intensely inspirational and creative peak."

== Track listing ==
All songs written by Bob Dylan, except as noted.

=== Side 1 ===
1. "Love Minus Zero/No Limit"
2. "North Country Blues"
3. "You Ain't Goin' Nowhere"
4. "Drifter's Escape"
5. "I Pity the Poor Immigrant"

=== Side 2 ===
1. "Tears of Rage" (Bob Dylan, Richard Manuel)
2. "Sad Eyed Lady of the Lowlands"

=== Side 3 ===
1. "Love Is Just a Four-Letter Word"
2. "I Dreamed I Saw St. Augustine"
3. "Walls of Red Wing"
4. "Dear Landlord"
5. "One Too Many Mornings"

=== Side 4 ===
1. "I Shall Be Released"
2. "Boots of Spanish Leather"
3. "Walkin' Down the Line"
4. "Restless Farewell"

== Personnel ==
- Joan Baez – vocals, guitar
- Fred Carter Jr. – mandolin
- Pete Drake – pedal steel guitar
- Johnny Gimble – fiddle
- Roy Huskey Jr. – bass
- Tommy Jackson – fiddle
- Jerry Kennedy – guitar
- Jerry Reed – guitar
- Harold Bradley – guitar, Dobro
- Hargus "Pig" Robbins – piano
- Stephen Stills – guitar
- Harold Rugg – guitar, Dobro
- Grady Martin – guitar
- Buddy Spicher – fiddle
- Norbert Putnam – bass
- Kenny Buttrey – drums
- Charlie McCoy – harmonica

== Chart positions ==
Year	Chart	Position
1969	Billboard Pop Albums	30

== Certifications ==
Certifications for Any Day Now
Region	Certification	Certified units/sales
United States (RIAA)	Gold	500,000^{^}
^{^} Shipments figures based on certification alone.
