= Boots of Spanish Leather =

Song by Bob Dylan

from the album The Times They Are a-Changin'
- Released: January 13, 1964
- Recorded: August 7, 1963
- Genre: American folk music
- Length: 4:40
- Label: Columbia Records
- Songwriter: Bob Dylan
- Producer: Tom Wilson

"Boots of Spanish Leather" is a ballad written and performed by Bob Dylan, recorded in New York City on August 7, 1963, and released in 1964 on his album The Times They Are a-Changin'. It features Dylan solo on the acoustic guitar, playing the song using fingerpicking.

== Background and composition ==
Dylan scholar Michael Gray sees a strong parallel between this and the traditional folk song "Blackjack Davey", which Dylan arranged and recorded for his 1992 album Good as I Been to You, and in which footwear "of Spanish leather" also plays a significant role. However, comparisons are more often made between this song and the traditional ballad "Scarborough Fair" (from which Dylan's "Girl from the North Country" is also drawn), both regarding melody and lyrics, as it also consists of alternating male and female narrators.

Lyrically, "Boots of Spanish Leather" is unusual in that it uses the epistolary format. It has been described as a "restless, forlorn ballad for the ages and sages—a classic Dylan tale of two lovers, a crossroads, and the open sea". The song is written as a dialogue, with the first six stanzas alternating between the two lovers; however, the last three stanzas are given by the lover who has been left behind. Within these nine stanzas, one of the lovers—a woman—goes across the sea. She writes, asking whether her lover would like any gift and he refuses, stating that he only wants her back. Towards the end it becomes clear that she is not returning, and she finally writes saying she may never come back. Her lover comes to realize what has happened and finally gives her a material request: "Spanish boots of Spanish leather".

== Critical reception and legacy ==
"Boots of Spanish Leather" ranked 19th in a 2017 Paste list of "The 42 Best Bob Dylan Songs". In an article accompanying the list, critic Cameron Wade notes that in "just four-and-a-half minutes, Dylan creates two richly layered and dynamic characters, each reckoning with the messy emotions of young love coming to an end" and calls it "Dylan at his most open and vulnerable—a rare sight for the notoriously introverted and private songwriter, but it proves he’s master of his craft, writing a heartbreaking ballad that measures up to the best of them".

Stereogum ran an article to coincide with Dylan's 80th birthday on May 24, 2021 in which 80 musicians were asked to name their favorite Dylan songs. Both Caroline Rose and Johanna Warren selected "Boots of Spanish Leather". Rose called it "the first Dylan song I ever heard that stopped me in my tracks. It tells such a straightforward story, a conversation between two free-spirited young lovers, one of whom is traveling on the other side of the world. The love between them is at first full of hope. The gift of Spanish boots represents a gesture of care. But as the song goes on the conversation becomes less hopeful, and the boots seem to become more of a parting gift. It’s kind of a funny choice for a gift. Boots often symbolize leaving, or walking away. I always wonder if this was a conscious choice, or if he really just wanted some leather boots. Either way, I enjoy this little bit of comedy amidst an otherwise heartbreaking story". Warren noted "Moral of the story: Whether your 'boots' are literally material gifts or alternative forms of currency, i.e. rock-solid emotional support, make sure all your relationships are reciprocal and mutually honoring".

The song is included in the Norton Anthology of Poetry, 5th edition, in the section titled "Popular Ballads of the 20th Century".

== Live performances ==
Though occasionally performed live in Dylan's early career—for example at a New York City concert during the spring preceding the song's studio recording, as heard on Live 1962-1966: Rare Performances from the Copyright Collections—Dylan did not start performing "Boots of Spanish Leather" regularly until his Never Ending Tour began in 1988. According to his official website, Dylan has played the song 300 times in total between 1963 and 2019. A live version performed in Atlanta, Georgia on August 3, 1996 was included as a b-side to Dylan's European "Not Dark Yet" singles in February 1998. Another live version, performed in Glasgow, Scotland on January 21, 1998, was included on the Japanese EP Not Dark Yet: Dylan Alive Vol. 2, released on April 21, 1999.

== Covers ==
"Boots of Spanish Leather" has been covered by many musicians, including:

- Joan Baez: Any Day Now
- Sebastian Cabot: Sebastian Cabot, Actor-Bob Dylan, Poet (1967)
- Dervish: Spirit (2003)
- The Dubliners: 30 Years A-Greying (1992) (with De Dannan)
- Nanci Griffith: Other Voices, Other Rooms (1993), Winter Marquee (2002), Putumayo Presents American Folk (2005)
- Nic Jones: Unearthed (2001)
- Richie Havens: Electric Haven (1966)
- Various Artists (performed by Ida): A Tribute to Bob Dylan, Volume 3: The Times They Are A-Changin' (2000)
- Linda Mason: How Many Seas Must a White Dove Sail (1964)
- Dan McCafferty: Dan McCafferty (1975)
- Ronnie Drew and Eleanor Shanley on their live album A Couple More Years (2000)
- Michael Moore: Jewels and Binoculars (2000)
- Hannah Sanders & Ben Savage: Before the Sun (2015)
- Seldom Scene: Scene It All (2000)
- Martin Simpson: Bootleg USA
- Various Artists (performed by Martin Simpson): A Nod to Bob (2001)
- T. Duggins: T. Duggens:Undone (2006)
- Rebecca Barnard: "Everlasting" (2010)
- Patti Smith: "Bowery Ballroom" (12/30/2010)
- Ewan McLellan: Younger Than That Now (2011)
- The Airborne Toxic Event: Chimes of Freedom: Songs of Bob Dylan Honoring 50 Years of Amnesty International (1/24/2012)
- Wesley Schultz: from The Lumineers: "Look Sessions" (2013)
- Amos Lee with The Forest Rangers: Played in the opening scene on Episode 10 of the final season of the FX series Sons Of Anarchy.
- Mandolin Orange: Audiotree Live (2014)
- The Lumineers: "Cleopatra" Target Exclulsive Edition (2016)
- Guido Belcanto: Dutch translation titled "Laarzen Van Spaans Leder" on CD "Liefde & Devotie" (2017)
- Ebba Forsberg and Mikael Wiehe (as "Spanska stövlar", in a Swedish translation by Wiehe): Dylan på svenska (2006)
- Half Moon Run: As a single (2024)

== See also ==
- List of Bob Dylan songs based on earlier tunes
- Peau d'Espagne
