= John Wesley Harding (song) =

Song by Bob Dylan

from the album John Wesley Harding
- Released: December 27, 1967
- Recorded: November 6, 1967
- Studio: Columbia Studio A (Nashville, Tennessee)
- Genre: Folk rock; country rock
- Length: 2:59
- Label: Columbia
- Songwriter: Bob Dylan
- Producer: Bob Johnston

Audio sample
- file; help

"John Wesley Harding" is a song by American singer-songwriter Bob Dylan that appears as the opening track on his 1967 album of the same name.

== Writing and recording ==
Dylan told Jann Wenner in a 1969 Rolling Stone interview that the song "started out to be a long ballad. I was gonna write a ballad on ... like maybe one of those old cowboy ... you know, a real long ballad. But in the middle of the second verse, I got tired. I had a tune, and I didn't want to waste the tune; it was a nice little melody, so I just wrote a quick third verse, and I recorded that." Biographer Clinton Heylin states that Dylan has had a well-documented interest in outlaw cowboys, including Jesse James and Billy the Kid, and in the past Dylan has said that his favorite folk song was "John Hardy", whose real-life title character in 1893 murdered another man over a game of craps. John Wesley Hardin was another late-19th century outlaw. Dylan has stated that he chose John Wesley Hardin for his protagonist over other outlaws because his name "[fit] in the tempo" of the song. Dylan added the g to the end of Hardin's name by mistake.

The song was recorded in two takes on November 6, 1967, in Studio A of Columbia Music Row Studios in Nashville, Tennessee. Both of these were considered for the album, but the second take was ultimately chosen.

== Themes ==
Dylan has said that he did not have a clear notion of what the song was about. He told Cameron Crowe in 1985 that after recording the John Wesley Harding album, he "didn't know what to make of it. ... So I figured the best thing to do would be to put out the album as quickly as possible, call it John Wesley Harding because that was the one song that I had no idea what it was about, why it was even on the album. So I figured I'd call the album that, call attention to it, make it something special..." It was the only title that he considered for the album. He told a Newsweek interviewer in 1969 that the songs on his country Nashville Skyline album: "These are the type of songs that I always felt like writing. The songs reflect more of the inner me than the songs of the past. They're more to my base than, say, 'John Wesley Harding'. There I felt like everyone expected me to be a poet so that's what I tried to be."

== Cover versions ==
"John Wesley Harding" has been covered by McKendree Spring on their 1969 eponymous album, as well as Tom Russell and Wesley Willis.
