= Dear Landlord =

1967 song by Bob Dylan

Song by Bob Dylan

from the album John Wesley Harding
- Released: December 27, 1967
- Recorded: November 29, 1967
- Studio: Columbia Studio A (Nashville, Tennessee)
- Genre: Blues
- Length: 3:19
- Label: Columbia
- Songwriter: Bob Dylan
- Producer: Bob Johnston

"Dear Landlord" is a song by American singer-songwriter Bob Dylan. It was recorded on November 29, 1967, at Columbia Recording Studios, Nashville, produced by Bob Johnston. The song was released on Dylan's album John Wesley Harding on December 27, 1967. It is a piano blues that has been interpreted as an address to his then-manager Albert Grossman.

== Background and recording ==
The song is a piano blues and was Dylan's first piano song since "Ballad of a Thin Man" (1965). It was recorded on November 29, 1967, at Columbia Recording Studios, Nashville, produced by Bob Johnston, and was the last song recorded for John Wesley Harding. It was released as the seventh track on the album, on December 27, 1967.

== Composition and lyrical interpretation ==
The song's lyric "Please don't put a price on my soul" has been interpreted as a plea to his manager Albert Grossman, who was also his landlord at the time, or perhaps to his audience. In 1971, Dylan said that he did not have Grossman in mind when composing the song, but "only later when people pointed out that the song may have been written for Grossman I thought it could have been ... it's an abstract song." Music academic Mike Jones regards the song as a "warning to Grossman from Dylan that he should not be underestimated". Dylan biographer Anthony Scaduto had suggested that the track was Dylan's mind addressing his body.

== Critical reception ==
In Crawdaddy (May 1968), Jon Landau praised the song, although its target was unclear, for having "No reliance on exaggerated mannerisms but a simple and direct statement", and noted that the "melodic structure of the song is one of the most sophisticated Dylan has ever devised". Paul Williams described the song as Dylan's "most heartfelt performance" on the album, and wrote positively of the contributions of all three musicians, calling Dylan's piano-playing "fiery" and opining that bass player Charlie McCoy and drummer Kenneth Buttrey "pick up on the energy of the song and run with it", without being concerned that the music does not fit any particular musical idiom. Allan Jones of Uncut rated "Dear Landlord" with 4 out of 5 stars in 2015.

A 2009 list by American Songwriter rated the song as Dylan's 30th best, but it was ranked only 186th by Jim Beviglia.

== Live performances ==
As of April 2022, Dylan had performed "Dear Landlord" live six times. He first played the song live on October 25, 1992, and most recently included it for a short time in his live sets in 2003.

== Personnel ==
The personnel for the November 29, 1967, recordings at Columbia Recording Studios, Nashville, are listed below.

Musicians

- Bob Dylan – vocals, piano
- Charlie McCoy – bass
- Kenneth Buttrey – drums

Technical

- Bob Johnston – production
- Charlie Bragg – engineering

== Official releases ==
- John Wesley Harding (released 1967)
- Biograph (released 1985)
- The Original Mono Recordings (released 2010)

== Cover versions ==
The song was covered by Joan Baez on her album Any Day Now in 1968, and appeared on 1969 albums by Janis Joplin (I Got Dem Ol' Kozmic Blues Again Mama!), Fairport Convention (a bonus track on later releases of Unhalfbricking, with Dave Mattacks on drums rather than Martin Lamble who had played on the album) and Joe Cocker (Joe Cocker!).
