= The Ballad of Frankie Lee and Judas Priest =

- Cover of the Portuguese EP (1968)

Song by Bob Dylan

from the album John Wesley Harding
- Released: December 27, 1967
- Recorded: October 17, 1967
- Studio: Columbia Studio A (Nashville, Tennessee)
- Length: 5:35
- Label: Columbia
- Songwriter(s): Bob Dylan
- Producer(s): Bob Johnston

Official audio
- "The Ballad of Frankie Lee and Judas Priest" on YouTube

"The Ballad of Frankie Lee and Judas Priest" is a song by American singer-songwriter Bob Dylan. It was released as the fifth track on his eighth studio album John Wesley Harding (1967). The track was written by Dylan and produced by Bob Johnston. It was recorded in one take on October 17, 1967, at Columbia Studio A in Nashville. The song's lyrics refer to two friends, Frankie Lee and Judas Priest. Lee asks Priest for a loan of money and Priest offers it freely. Lee spends it in a brothel over 16 days, then dies of thirst in Priest's arms. It has been suggested by commentators that the song refers to Dylan's relationship with his manager Albert Grossman or to his contractual negotiations with his record company. The song received a mixed critical reception. Dylan performed the song live in concert 20 times, from 1987 to 2000.

== Background and recording ==
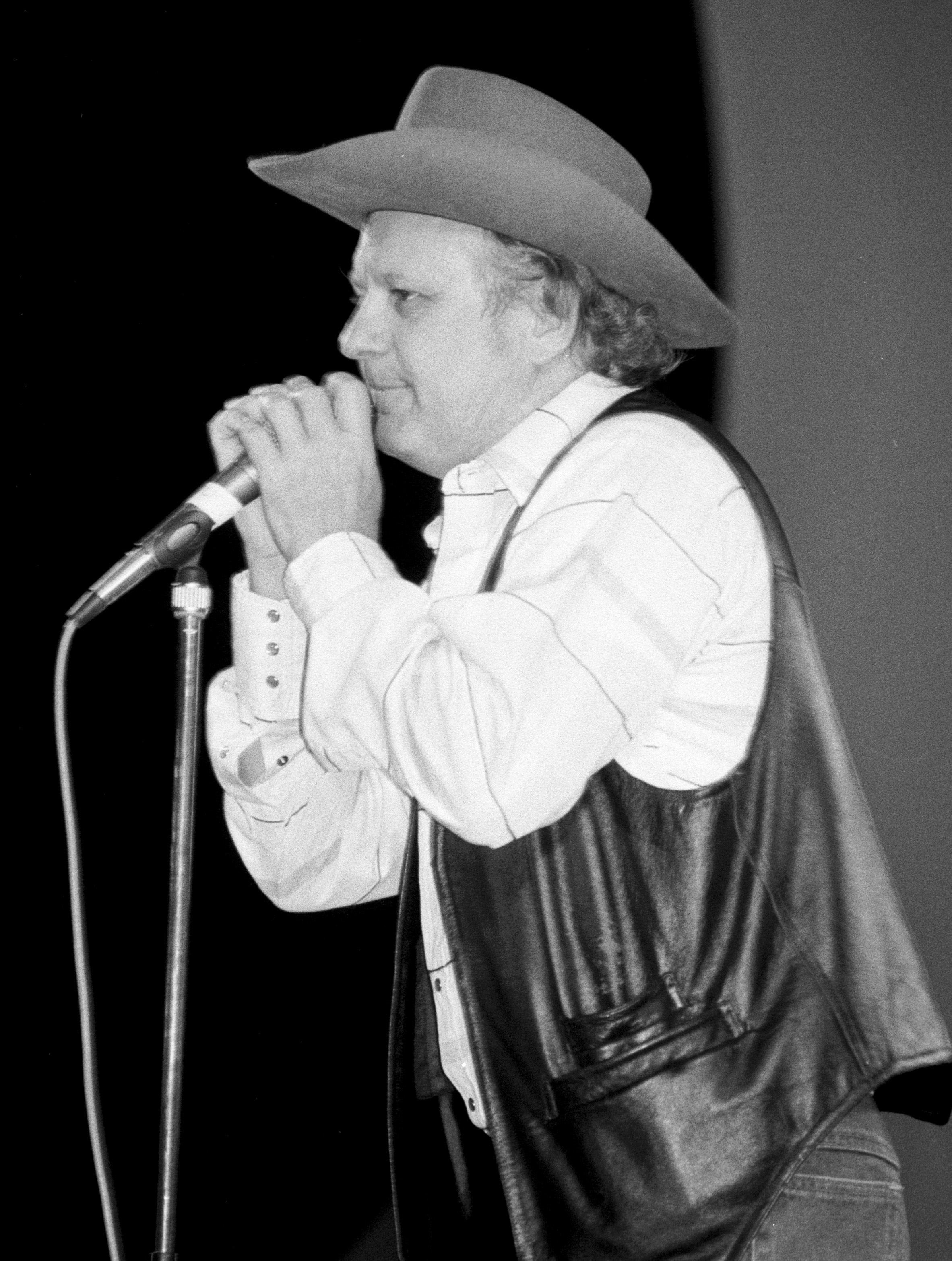
Charlie McCoy (pictured in 1990) played bass on the song

Dylan's seventh studio album, Blonde on Blonde, was released in June 1966. In July 1966, Dylan had a motorcycle accident, and spent the next year-and-a-half recovering and writing songs at his home in Woodstock. From around June to October 1967, he recorded 138 songs with members of the group the Hawks (later known as the Band).

According to Dylan biographer Clinton Heylin, all the songs for John Wesley Harding, Dylan's eighth studio album, were written and recorded during a six-week period at the end of 1967. With one child born in early 1966 and another in mid-1967, Dylan had settled into family life.

"The Ballad of Frankie Lee and Judas Priest" was recorded in one take during the first recording session for John Wesley Harding on October 17, 1967, in Columbia Studio A, Nashville. The producer was Bob Johnston. Dylan speaks, rather than sings, the lyrics, and plays guitar and harmonica. He is accompanied by Charlie McCoy on bass and Kenneth Buttrey on drums; both had been part of the larger cohort of musicians that played on Blonde on Blonde. Dylan told interviewer Jann Wenner that he had been seeking a sound similar to Gordon Lightfoot's album The Way I Feel, which McCoy and Buttrey had also played on. The song was released as the fifth track on John Wesley Harding on December 27, 1967. It was issued as the lead track of an EP single in Portugal in 1968, and included on the compilation box set The Original Mono Recordings in 2010.

== Lyrical interpretation ==
The song has 11 verses and is the longest track on John Wesley Harding. According to authors Philippe Margotin and Jean Michel Guesdon, the lyrics refer to two friends, Frankie Lee and Judas Priest. Lee asks Priest for a loan of money and Priest offers it freely. Lee spends it in a brothel over 16 days, then dies of thirst in Priest's arms. English-language scholar Homer Hogan viewed Priest as an insincere friend who tempts Lee with a false vision, leading to a conclusion where Lee is "destroyed rather than transformed". After Lee's death, a "neighbour boy" who appears to be involved in Lee's demise, mumbles that "nothing is revealed". Hogan argued that Dylan invokes several myths through the song, including "the basic story of the god-possessed hero sacrificed by the priest, and the re-birth of the hero in a child", as well as Christian themes including those of a sinner seeking salvation, of a betrayal by Judas, the Temptation of Christ, and a devil in the guise of an angel.

The song ends with a moral, telling the listener:

... one should never be
Where one does not belong.
So when you see your neighbor carryin' somethin'
Help him with his load
And don't go mistaking Paradise
For that home across the road.

AJ Weberman interpreted the song as a parable of Dylan's relationship with his manager Albert Grossman. Dylan biographer Robert Shelton described the song as "a comic tall tale in frontier-ballad style" and speculated that Lee may represent Dylan, and Priest may represent the music business. Critic Andy Gill regarded the early verses, where Lee considers Priest's offer of the money, as having parallels with Dylan's contractual discussions with Columbia shortly before the album's recording.

Poet Allen Ginsberg recalled that Dylan told him during conversations in 1968 that he was aiming to write shorter lines that each advanced the narrative of the song. Ginsberg felt that this was evident in some of Dylan's work from around that period, for example in "I Shall Be Released" and "The Ballad of Frankie Lee and Judas Priest" (which Ginsberg called a "strong laconic ballad"), where, according to Ginsberg "There was to be no wasted language, no wasted breath. All the imagery was to be functional rather than ornamental." Hogan argues that the song "requires inner liberation if we are to let ourselves respond fully" but that through Dylan's delivery in a "country and western style" and, most importantly, "the magic of myth", Dylan helps the listener achieve that state of liberation. Wilfrid Mellers commented that the song featured "an unremitting talkin' style, and the words spoken, for all their biblical references, could hardly be more confusedly bleak".

== Reception and influence ==
Peter Johnson of the Los Angeles Times criticized the track for being "riddled with clichés", adding "As if that were not bad enough, Dylan offers three hoary lessons from the song". Johnson felt that while Dylan had previously used clichés inventively, "in this album they have nothing to feed on but themselves." While noting that the track was amongst the favorite among some of Dylan's fans, journalist Mike Marqusee dismissed the song as "a contrived allegory that teases and baffles but ultimately bores." In the Chicago Tribune, Ross Baker felt that Dylan's songwriting had declined in quality, writing "He gave us fantastical memorable portraits before ... Now we have sketchily dull pictures like ... Frankie Lee, [and] Judas Priest ... whom it's impossible to care about in the least." Margotin and Guesdon wrote that "the performance is not up to par. The guitar part lacks rigor". Gill called it the "dullest" track on John Wesley Harding: he refers to the final verse as a "bland moral".

Jim Beviglia ranked the song 20th in his 2013 book Counting Down Bob Dylan: His 100 Finest Songs, referring to it as "one of the most perplexing songs Bob Dylan has ever released" and "the most instantly enjoyable" track on John Wesley Harding. It was awarded an "A" rating by John Nogowski, who felt that Dylan's vocal and harmonica performance underpinned the track. The song was the inspiration for the name of the English heavy metal band Judas Priest.

== Live performances ==
According to his official website, Dylan played "The Ballad of Frankie Lee and Judas Priest" live 20 times in concert between 1987 and 2000. Trager wrote about Dylan's initial performances of the number with Grateful Dead on their 1987 tour that "A poorer song choice probably couldn't have been made, for this intimate parable was lost in the large football stadium venues where the shows took place." Paul Williams was generally critical of the tour's quality, but felt that the performance of the song on July 19 in Eugene, Oregon was one of several "pleasing performances [at the show], though of course one wishes Dylan as vocalist and storyteller could have been even half as present on 'Frankie Lee' as he was on the original 1968 recording". Trager considered the performances on the Temples in Flames Tour with Tom Petty and the Heartbreakers to be significantly improved from those with Grateful Dead. According to Williams, "getting to hear Bob Dylan sing 'Frankie Lee and Judas Priest' and 'Shelter from the Storm' as though this might be his last chance ever and he doesn't want to waste it, is certainly a memorable experience". Dylan later performed the song several times in both 1988 and 2000 on his Never Ending Tour.

== Personnel ==
The personnel for the October 1967, recordings at Columbia Recording Studios, Nashville, are listed below.

Musicians

- Bob Dylan – vocals, guitar, harmonica
- Charlie McCoy – bass
- Kenneth Buttrey – drums

Technical

- Bob Johnston – production
- Charlie Bragg – engineering
