= McKendree Spring =

American progressive folk-rock band

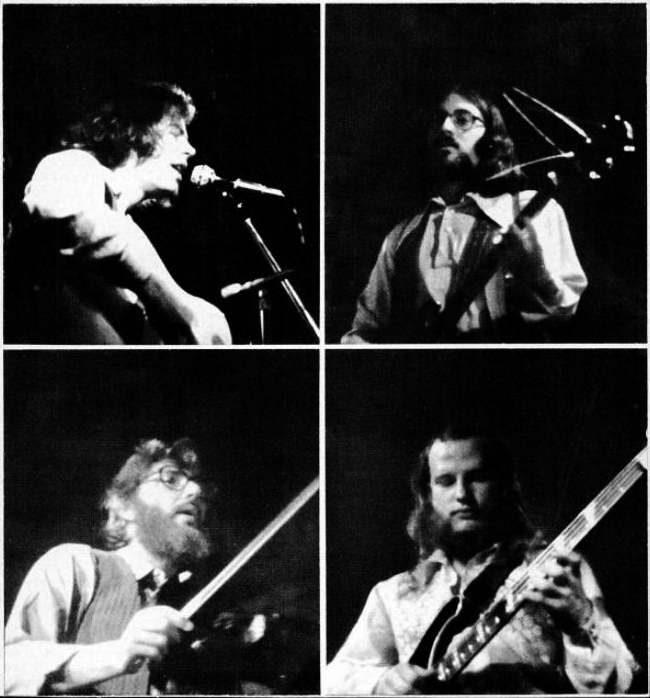
- McKendree Spring in 1970

Background information
- Origin: Glens Falls, New York, United States
- Genres: Folk rock; progressive folk; progressive rock; country rock
- Years active: 1969–1976, 2009-2021
- Labels: Decca; MCA; Pye
- Members: Fran McKendree; Dr. Michael Dreyfuss; Christopher Bishop; Martin Slutsky; Carson Michaels
- Website: mckendreespring.com

McKendree Spring is a progressive folk-rock band, formed in 1968 and particularly active in the early 1970s. The band, originally known as McKendree Spring Quartet, formed at Adirondack Community College in Queensbury, New York. The group's leader was Fran McKendree (vocals and guitar); their first bass player was Larry Tucker, followed by Fred Holman; Dr. Michael Dreyfuss (electric violin, viola, Moog, Arp, Mellotron); and Martin Slutsky (electric guitar). Christopher Bishop replaced Holman on bass as of the 1973 release Spring Suite. Some of their music ventured into avant-garde or experimental territory, such as "God Bless the Conspiracy" from their album 3, with its violin/viola/synthesizer solo by Dreyfuss.

Steve Anderson (bass and vocals) and Alan Stoker (drums and vocals) were added for the "Live at the Beachland" live performance recording and 2007 release. In addition, Dave Morrison (harmonica) also played on the live album.

In the summer of 2010, Christopher Bishop (bass and vocals) rejoined the group for the recording of 5 songs for "McKendree Spring: Recording No. 9". This recording also featured Alan Stoker (drums/percussion/vocals), Paul Hollowell (keys) and Fred Mollin (synth).

The band reunited for one final show at the legendary Douglas Corner club in Nashville, May 2013, which was video recorded and released in Dec. 2015 on DVD as McKendree Spring: Times Like These. Fran McKendree, Mike 'Doc' Dreyfuss, and Marty Slutsky, the three founding members of the band, are supported by bassist Chris Bishop, keyboardist Paul Hollowell [Dolly Parton], Nashville standouts Alan Stoker (drums and vocals) and Rock Williams on sax, along with harmony singing by Carol Anderson and Sharon Ferrara Slutsky.

According to the official site, Michael Dreyfuss died on September 25, 2017.

Fran McKendree (born Robert Francis McKendree on May 9, 1947, in Springfield, Massachusetts) died of cancer on June 10, 2021, at age 74.

== Albums ==
Year	Album	Chart Positions	Label
Year	Album	US Top 200	Label
1969	McKendree Spring	—	Decca
1970	Second Thoughts	192	Decca
1972	McKendree Spring 3	163	Decca
1972	Tracks	—	Decca
1973	Spring Suite	—	MCA
1975	Get Me to the Country	118	Pye
1976	Too Young To Feel This Old	193	Pye
2007	Live at the Beachland Ballroom	—	McKendree Spring Records
2010	Recording No. 9	—	McKendree Spring Records
2015	Times Like These	—	McKendree Spring Records

== Charted singles ==
Year	Single	Chart positions	Album
Year	Single	US/US Bub.	Album
1971	"Because It's Time"	105	Second Thoughts (1970)
1976	"Too Young to Feel This Old"	110	Too Young to Feel This Old (1976)
