= Wendy Bucklew =

American rock singer-songwriter

Wendy Bucklew is an American rock singer-songwriter who became well known as part of the Atlanta folk rock scene, which she joined in 1988. She toured nationally and released four full-length CDs. Painting Sidewalks, her third and most popular release, produced by DeDe Vogt, was in heavy rotation in several Americana stations in the U.S. and in Europe. Tammy Susan Hurt played drums and percussion on the album. When Clear Channel purchased virtually all of the Americana independent radio stations, her airplay was nearly eliminated overnight and replaced with top-ten commercial music.

A very private person, Bucklew was often conflicted about her pursuits in the music business. She continued to write songs as she had since she first began at the age of 6, but to date she has chosen to pursue her many other interests. Much of her repertoire is available on iTunes and CD Baby.

== Discography ==
- Rage in the Ring (1990)
- Painting Sidewalks (1994)
- Asleep in the Swing (1996)
- After You (2002)
