= The 50th Anniversary Collection 1964 =

50th Anniversary Collection 1964

Compilation album by Bob Dylan
- Released: December 2014
- Recorded: February 1 – November 27, 1964
- Genre: Folk
- Length: 440:02
- Label: Sony Music Entertainment
- Producer: John H. Hammond

Bob Dylan chronology
The Bootleg Series Vol. 11: The Basement Tapes Complete (2014)	50th Anniversary Collection 1964 (2014)	Shadows in the Night (2015)

The 50th Anniversary Collection 1964 is the third Bob Dylan collection released by Sony Music to prevent the recordings from legally entering the public domain in Europe. Released on vinyl only in December 2014, only 1,000 copies of the nine-LP set were produced.

== Track listing ==
LP 1—Side A (Live, 1 February 1964, CBC TV Studios, Toronto)
No.	Title	Length
1.	"The Times They Are a-Changin'"	2:36
2.	"Talking World War III Blues"	4:53
3.	"The Lonesome Death of Hattie Carroll"	5:27
4.	"A Hard Rain's a-Gonna Fall"	6:02
5.	"Restless Farewell"	5:03
Total length:		24:01

LP 1—Side B (May 1964, Eric Von Schmidt's House, Sarasota)
No.	Title	Length
1.	"The Lonesome Death of Hattie Carroll" (Live, 25 February 1964, The Steve Allen Show, Los Angeles)	6:04
2.	"Bob and Eric Blues #1"	6:35
3.	"Black Betty"	1:22
4.	"Come All You Fair and Tender Ladies"	4:48
5.	"Florida Woman"	2:58
6.	"Johnny Cuckoo"	3:47
Total length:		25:34

LP 2—Side A (May 1964, Eric Von Schmidt's House, Sarasota)
No.	Title	Length
1.	"Money Honey"	3:34
2.	"More and More"	4:00
3.	"Mr. Tambourine Man"	6:11
4.	"Susie Q"	5:36
5.	"Harmonica Duet"	2:27
6.	"Glory, Glory (Lay My Burden Down)"	3:08
Total length:		24:56

LP 2—Side B (May 1964, Eric Von Schmidt's House, Sarasota)
No.	Title	Length
1.	"Dr. Strangelove Blues"	5:45
2.	"Stoned on the Mountain"	1:35
3.	"Stoned on the Mountain"	3:28
4.	"Walkin' Down the Line"	3:00
5.	"Joshua Gone Barbados"	4:03
6.	"With God on Our Side" (Live, May 1964, BBC Studios, London)	2:00
7.	"Don't Think Twice, It's All Right" (Live, 14 May 1964, Didsbury Studios, Manchester)	3:15
Total length:		23:06

LP 3—Side A (Live, 17 May 1964, Royal Festival Hall, London)
No.	Title	Length
1.	"The Times They Are A-Changin'"	3:35
2.	"Girl from the North Country"	3:49
3.	"Who Killed Davey Moore?"	3:17
4.	"Talkin' John Birch Paranoid Blues"	3:28
5.	"Ballad of Hollis Brown"	5:55
6.	"It Ain't Me Babe"	4:29
Total length:		24:33

LP 3—Side B (Live, 17 May 1964, Royal Festival Hall, London)
No.	Title	Length
1.	"Walls of Red Wing"	4:00
2.	"Chimes of Freedom"	7:32
3.	"Mr. Tambourine Man"	6:37
4.	"Eternal Circle"	2:59
Total length:		21:08

LP 4—Side A (Live, 17 May 1964, Royal Festival Hall, London)
No.	Title	Length
1.	"A Hard Rain's a-Gonna Fall"	7:44
2.	"Talkin' World War III Blues"	5:41
3.	"Don't Think Twice, It's All Right"	5:08
4.	"Only a Pawn in Their Game"	5:47
Total length:		24:20

LP 4—Side B (Live, 17 May 1964, Royal Festival Hall, London)
No.	Title	Length
1.	"With God on Our Side"	6:20
2.	"The Lonesome Death of Hattie Carroll"	6:54
3.	"Restless Farewell"	7:13
4.	"When the Ship Comes In"	3:39
Total length:		24:06

LP 5—Side A (9 June 1964, Columbia Studios, New York City, Another Side Of Bob Dylan sessions)
No.	Title	Length
1.	"Denise"	3:01
2.	"It Ain't Me, Babe - Take I"	2:07
3.	"Spanish Harlem Incident - Take III"	3:09
4.	"Spanish Harlem Incident - Take III"	1:31
5.	"Ballad in Plain D - Take II"	2:02
6.	"I Don't Believe You (She Acts Like We Never Have Met) - Take I"	4:07
7.	"I Don't Believe You (She Acts Like We Never Have Met) - Take III"	3:56
Total length:		19:53

LP 5—Side B (9 June 1964, Columbia Studios, New York City, Another Side Of Bob Dylan sessions)
No.	Title	Length
1.	"Chimes of Freedom - Take I"	3:12
2.	"Chimes of Freedom - Take III"	3:07
3.	"Mr. Tambourine Man - Take II"	0:46
4.	"Black Crow Blues - Take I"	1:20
5.	"Black Crow Blues - Take II"	3:48
6.	"I Shall Be Free No. 10 - Take I"	0:50
7.	"I Shall Be Free No. 10 - Take II"	3:17
8.	"I Shall Be Free No. 10 - Take III"	5:09
9.	"I Shall Be Free No. 10 - Take IV"	4:43
Total length:		26:12

LP 6—Side A
No.	Title	Length
1.	"It Ain't Me, Babe" (Live, 24 July 1964, Newport Folk Festival)	3:47
2.	"All I Really Want to Do" (Live, 26 July 1964, Newport Folk Festival)	3:40
3.	"To Ramona" (Live, 26 July 1964, Newport Folk Festival)	4:25
4.	"Mama, You Been on My Mind" (Live, 8 August 1964, Forest Hills Tennis Stadium, New York City)	2:35
5.	"It Ain't Me, Babe" (Live, 8 August 1964, Forest Hills Tennis Stadium, New York City)	3:51
6.	"With God on Our Side" (Live, 8 August 1964, Forest Hills Tennis Stadium, New York City)	5:33
Total length:		23:51

LP 6—Side B (Live, 10 October 1964, Town Hall, Philadelphia)
No.	Title	Length
1.	"The Times They Are A-Changin'"	3:33
2.	"Girl from the North Country"	4:06
3.	"Who Killed Davey Moore"	3:40
4.	"Talkin' John Birch Paranoid Blues"	4:12
5.	"To Ramona"	5:11
6.	"Ballad of Hollis Brown"	5:48
Total length:		26:30

LP 7—Side A (Live, 10 October 1964, Town Hall, Philadelphia)
No.	Title	Length
1.	"Chimes of Freedom"	7:18
2.	"I Don't Believe You (She Acts Like We Never Have Met)"	4:18
3.	"It's Alright, Ma (I'm Only Bleeding)"	9:54
Total length:		21:30

LP 7—Side B (Live, 10 October 1964, Town Hall, Philadelphia)
No.	Title	Length
1.	"Mr. Tambourine Man"	7:00
2.	"Talking World War III Blues"	5:39
3.	"A Hard Rain's a-Gonna Fall"	7:44
4.	"Don't Think Twice, It's All Right"	4:20
Total length:		24:43

LP 8—Side A (Live, 10 October 1964, Town Hall, Philadelphia)
No.	Title	Length
1.	"Only a Pawn in Their Game"	4:53
2.	"With God on Our Side"	6:35
3.	"It Ain't Me Babe"	4:25
4.	"The Lonesome Death of Hattie Carroll"	6:19
5.	"All I Really Want to Do"	3:20
Total length:		26:22

LP 8—Side B (Live, 27 November 1964, Masonic Memorial Auditorium, San Francisco)
No.	Title	Length
1.	"Gates of Eden"	6:04
2.	"If You Gotta Go, Go Now"	2:54
3.	"It's Alright, Ma (I'm Only Bleeding)"	8:26
4.	"Talking World War III Blues"	5:29
5.	"Don't Think Twice, It's All Right"	4:03
6.	"Mama, You Been on My Mind"	2:17
Total length:		29:13

LP 9—Side A (Live, 25 November 1964, Civic Auditorium, San José)
No.	Title	Length
1.	"The Times They Are A-Changin'"	3:17
2.	"Talkin' John Birch Paranoid Blues"	3:36
3.	"To Ramona"	4:20
4.	"Gates of Eden"	7:34
5.	"If You Gotta Go, Go Now"	2:26
Total length:		21:13

LP 9—Side B (Live, 25 November 1964, Civic Auditorium, San José)
No.	Title	Length
1.	"It's Alright, Ma (I'm Only Bleeding)"	7:30
2.	"Mr. Tambourine Man"	6:02
3.	"A Hard Rain's a-Gonna Fall"	6:15
4.	"Talking World War III Blues"	4:43
5.	"Don't Think Twice, It's All Right"	4:21
Total length:		28:51
