= I Shall Be Free No. 10 =

1964 song by Bob Dylan

Song by Bob Dylan

from the album Another Side of Bob Dylan
- Released: August 8, 1964
- Recorded: June 9, 1964
- Studio: Columbia, New York
- Length: 4:46
- Label: Columbia
- Songwriter: Bob Dylan
- Producer: Tom Wilson

Audio
- "I Shall Be Free No. 10" on YouTube

"I Shall Be Free No. 10" is a song by American singer-songwriter Bob Dylan, which was released as the fifth track on his fourth studio album Another Side of Bob Dylan (1964). The song was written by Dylan and produced by Tom Wilson. The song is a humorous talking blues, indebted to earlier songs including Lead Belly's "We Shall Be Free". Dylan opens the song by proclaiming that he is normal and average, but then acknowledges his reputation by singing the self-aware doggerel "Yippee! I'm a poet, and I know it/ Hope I don't blow it".

Several takes were recorded on June 9, 1964, with a master take assembled from them and released on Another Side of Bob Dylan on August 8, 1964. Critics have received the song positively, praising its humor and noting that it contrasts with the serious track "Chimes of Freedom" that precedes it on the album. According to his official website, Dylan has never performed the song in concert.

== Background and recording ==
According to Bob Dylan's biographer Clinton Heylin's analysis of Dylan's drafts of lyrics from the period, "I Shall Be Free No. 10" was "composed in stages". The lyrics were likely started at the Mayfair Hotel in London in May 1964. They were finished during a week-long stay in the Greek village of Vernilya (possibly Vouliagmeni), later that month, after Dylan had travelled across Europe with friends and Nico. Several other songs, including "To Ramona", "It Ain't Me Babe" and "All I Really Want to Do" were completed in Vernilya. Some of the lyrics for the "To Ramona" were originally in "I Shall Be Free No. 10". Dylan recorded 14 songs between 7:00 pm and 10:00 pm on June 9, at Studio A, Columbia Recording Studios, New York, with Tom Wilson as producer. Of these, 11 tracks were selected for his fourth studio album, Another Side of Bob Dylan. (Note: The three that were not included on the album were "Mr. Tambourine Man" "Mama, You Been on My Mind", and "Denise Denise".)

Two of the five takes of "I Shall Be Free No. 10" were edited together for the album version, which lasts for four minutes and 46 seconds. It was released as the fifth track on side one of Another Side of Bob Dylan on August 8, 1964. An alternate version, with an extra verse, was issued on the Highway 61 Interactive interactive CD-ROM in 1995. In 2010, a version was released on The Original Mono Recordings, a box set of mono versions of Dylan's first eight studio albums. According to his official website, Dylan has never performed the song in concert. The song is a talking blues, a form popularized by Chris Bouchillon and used by Woody Guthrie.

== Composition and lyrical interpretation ==
"I Shall Be Free No. 10", like "I Shall Be Free" from Dylan's second studio album The Freewheelin' Bob Dylan (1963), derives from earlier songs such as Lead Belly's "We Shall Be Free", recorded with Guthrie and Sonny Terry in 1944. John H. Cowley traced stanzas from "We Shall Be Free" and similar songs back to the mid-nineteenth century. Early recorded variations include "You Shall" (1927) by Frank Stokes and Dan Sane (performing as the Beale Street Sheikhs), and "What a Time" (1928) by Jim Jackson. Critic Michael Gray noted similarities in the lyrics of Jackson's song to both the content of the Lead Belly track, and the lyrical and instrumental delivery by Dylan of his own "I Shall Be Free" songs. However, Jackson's version had not been released by 1964. Gray suggested that the title "I Shall Be Free No. 10" is an explicit acknowledgement by Dylan of "the many antecedents and variants and versions" of the older songs.

The song opens with Dylan declaiming his normality, in what scholar of English Charles O. Hartman described as "archetypal here-I-am-singing-in-front-of-you deixis". Critic Jim Curtis wrote that "you can practically see [Dylan] grinning" on the track.

I'm just average, common too
I'm just like him, the same as you
I'm everybody's brother and son
I ain't different from anyone
It ain't no use a-talking to me
Its just the same as talking to you

— Bob Dylan, from the opening verse of "I Shall Be Free No. 10"

Later in the song, Dylan, who had been receiving critical acclaim for his song-writing, sings "Yippee! I'm a poet, and I know it/ Hope I don't blow it". Literature scholar Timothy Hampton wrote that by referring to the critical recognition with "doggerel verse", Dylan "both acknowledges his genius and undercuts his claim to serious purpose at the same time." Hampton argued that "Nowhere is Dylan's status as artist, media figure, pop hero, and political spokesperson evoked with more self-awareness or complexity than in these lines."

Political Science professor Jeff Taylor and historian Chad Israelson, authors of The Political World of Bob Dylan: Freedom and Justice, Power and Sin (2015), observed that although Dylan had addressed political and civil rights themes in his early songs, he was never formally part of any organization, and that although he played at numerous benefit concerts, he rarely made political statements whilst performing. They wrote that his statement in the humorous "I Shall Be Free No. 10" that he was "'liberal to a degree' and that he wanted everyone 'to be free' is probably as close to a coherent description of his politics as anything."

Craig McGregor of The Sydney Morning Herald interpreted Another Side of Bob Dylan as a set of parodies of targets including the Beatles and Alfred Hitchcock movies. He considered "I Shall Be Free No. 10" to be a parody of the "throw-away lines and slightly folksy flavour of Woody Guthrie, Jack Elliott and half a dozen other talking blues experts." However, author Donald Brown noted that although Dylan's previous two albums had songs that referenced social and political issues, the only contemporary mentions on Another Side of Bob Dylan were in "I Shall Be Free No. 10": to world heavyweight boxing champion Cassius Clay, conservative Senator Barry Goldwater, and the space race between the United States and the Soviet Union.

== Critical comments ==
The reviewer for the Herald Express considered that the album established Dylan as the most important folk singer" since Woody Guthrie, and included "I Shall Be Free No. 10" amongst their favorite tracks on the album. In a generally negative review of Another Side of Bob Dylan, Grover Lewis of the Fort Worth Star-Telegram was positive about only two tracks; "I Shall Be Free No. 10" was described as "a zany surrealist-flavored improvisation", and highlighted, along with "Motorpsycho Nitemare", as tracks that "shows flashes of the same rocking drive and ambition that sparked [Dylan's] initial recordings".

In 1976, William Florence of The Times Herald wrote that on Another Side of Bob Dylan, "a wild sense of humor breaks into the open really for the first time", with those two tracks representing "classic examples of this more-relaxed and at-ease songwriter". It was ranked 16th on a list of the top 20 Dylan songs in Dave Marsh and Kevin Stein's The Book of Rock Lists (1982). Critic Andy Gill wrote that "Dylan presumably felt it might be prudent to lighten things up" after "Chimes of Freedom". Similarly, praising Dylan's "effortless delivery", author John Nogowski gave the song an "A-" rating. He remarked that the song was "welcome bit of Guthriesque comic relief" after the "verbal maelstrom" of Chimes of Freedom" which precedes it on the album.

== Credits and personnel ==
Credits adapted from the Bob Dylan All the Songs: The Story Behind Every Track book.

Musician

- Bob Dylan – vocals, rhythm guitar, harmonica

Technical personnel

- Tom Wilson – producer
- Roy Halee and Fred Catero – sound engineering
