= From Newport to the Ancient Empty Street in L.A. =

From Newport to the Ancient Empty Street in L.A

Live album (bootleg) by Bob Dylan
- Released: 1998
- Recorded: 1964–1965
- Genres: Folk; folk rock
- Length: 68:29
- Label: Dandelion

From Newport to the Ancient Empty Street in L.A is a bootleg recording of live performances by Bob Dylan. It contains recordings of Dylan performing at the Newport Folk Festival in July 1964 and July 1965. There are also recordings of Dylan performing at the Hollywood Bowl in September 1965. The album contains one performance omitted from the film The Other Side of the Mirror which records Dylan's Newport performances: a live version of "It Takes a Lot to Laugh, It Takes a Train to Cry" (under its original title, "Phantom Engineer") from his July 1965 Newport performance.

== Songs ==
The bootleg consists of 24 songs on two discs. The first disc contains 12 songs. Tracks 1–4 were recorded at the Newport Folk Festival on July 26, 1964. Tracks 5–8 were recorded July 25, 1965, at the same venue. Tracks 9–12 were recorded at the Hollywood Bowl on September 3, 1965. Additional songs from the same date and venue make up the first eleven tracks of the second disc. The first three songs are acoustic, while tracks 4–11 featured Dylan's electric set with The Hawks. The final song on disc two is an alternate studio version of "Tombstone Blues".

== Reception ==
Professional ratings
Review scores
Source	Rating
Allmusic	4.5/5 stars

Jason Ankeny of Allmusic called the bootleg "a near-definitive edition of this essential material, docked points solely for the curious omission of 'It Ain't Me Babe' from the 1964 Newport performance." Ankeny also wrote: "While lacking the primal force of his subsequent electric tour with the Hawks, the performance is nevertheless excellent, capturing the complexity and potency of songs like 'Tombstone Blues', 'Maggie's Farm' and 'Like a Rolling Stone' in full."

== Track listing ==
Disc one

1. "All I Really Want to Do" – 3:34
2. "To Ramona" – 4:33
3. "Mr. Tambourine Man" – 7:33
4. "Chimes Of Freedom" – 8:14
5. "Maggie's Farm" – 4:45
6. "Like a Rolling Stone" – 6:28
7. "Phantom Engineer" – 4:03
8. "It's All Over Now, Baby Blue" – 5:19
9. "She Belongs to Me" – 4:03
10. "To Ramona" – 5:59
11. "Gates of Eden" – 6:43
12. "It's All Over Now, Baby Blue" – 5:08

Disc two

13. "Desolation Row" – 10:10
14. "Love Minus Zero/No Limit" – 4:04
15. "Mr. Tambourine Man" – 5:40
16. "Tombstone Blues" – 5:03
17. "I Don't Believe You (She Acts Like We Never Have Met)" – 4:48
18. "From a Buick 6" – 3:18
19. "Just Like Tom Thumb's Blues" – 5:18
20. "Maggie's Farm" – 4:36
21. "It Ain't Me, Babe" – 4:41
22. "Ballad of a Thin Man" – 6:04
23. "Like a Rolling Stone" – 8:22
24. "Tombstone Blues" – 6:25
