= Byrd Jazz =

Live album by Donald Byrd
- Released: 1956
- Recorded: August 23, 1955
- Venue: New World Stage Theatre, Detroit, Michigan
- Genre: Jazz
- Length: 55:27
- Label: Transition; TRLP 5
- Producer: Tom Wilson

Donald Byrd chronology
Byrd Jazz (1956)	Byrd's Word (1955)

Byrd Jazz is an album by trumpeter Donald Byrd recorded in Detroit in 1955 and originally released on Tom Wilson's Transition label. The album contains Byrd's first recordings as a leader (although the sessions that comprised Byrd's Eye View were released first), and was later re-released as First Flight on the Delmark label.

== Reception ==
Professional ratings
Review scores
Source	Rating
Allmusic	3/5 stars
The Penguin Guide to Jazz	2/4 stars

In his review for Allmusic, Scott Yanow stated "all of the music is straightahead and swinging. A fine beginning for the very interesting career of Donald Byrd". The Penguin Guide to Jazz criticized the recording quality, and rated Lateef's soloing as more authoritative than that of Byrd.

== Track listing ==
All compositions by Donald Byrd except as indicated

1. "Blues" (Clifford Brown)* - 6:15
2. "Torsion Level" - 6:26
3. "Woody 'n' You" (Dizzy Gillespie) - 7:32
4. "Dancing in the Dark" (Howard Dietz, Arthur Schwartz) - 7:37
5. "Parisian Thoroughfare" (Bud Powell) - 14:26
6. "Yusef" (Barry Harris) - 5:36
7. "Shaw 'Nuff" (Ray Brown, Gil Fuller, Dizzy Gillespie) - 6:50

* the name of this track on the original LP was Blues but it is Clifford Brown's theme The Blues Walk which was first recorded and released on the 1954 album "Clifford Brown & Max Roach".

== Personnel ==
- Donald Byrd - trumpet
- Bernard McKinney - euphonium
- Yusef Lateef - tenor saxophone
- Barry Harris - piano
- Alvin Jackson - bass
- Frank Gant - drums
