= Shadows in the Night =

2015 album by Bob Dylan

Studio album by Bob Dylan
- Released: February 3, 2015
- Recorded: 2014
- Studio: Capitol (Hollywood)
- Genres: Traditional pop; vocal jazz
- Length: 35:17
- Label: Columbia
- Producer: Jack Frost

Bob Dylan chronology
The 50th Anniversary Collection 1964 (2014)	Shadows in the Night (2015)	The Bootleg Series Vol. 12: The Cutting Edge 1965–1966 (2015)

Bob Dylan studio album chronology
Tempest (2012)	Shadows in the Night (2015)	Fallen Angels (2016)

Singles from Shadows in the Night
- 1. "Full Moon and Empty Arms" Released: January 9, 2015; 2. "Stay with Me" Released: January 19, 2015

Shadows in the Night is the thirty-sixth studio album by Bob Dylan, released by Columbia Records on February 3, 2015. The album consists of covers of traditional pop standards made famous by Frank Sinatra, chosen by Dylan. Like most of his 21st century output, Dylan produced the album himself under the pseudonym Jack Frost.

Speaking of his intention behind the album, Dylan stated:

I don't see myself as covering these songs in any way. They've been covered enough. Buried, as a matter a fact. What me and my band are basically doing is uncovering them. Lifting them out of the grave and bringing them into the light of day.

The album garnered acclaim from critics, who praised its song selections as well as Dylan and his band's performance and arrangements. The album debuted at No. 1 on the UK Albums Chart, making Dylan the oldest male solo artist to chart at No. 1 in the UK. The album also debuted at No. 1 on the Norwegian and Swedish Album Charts. At the 2016 Grammys, it was nominated for Best Traditional Pop Vocal Album.

== Background and recording ==
Shadows in the Night consists of ten ballads that were recorded by Frank Sinatra in the late 1950s and early 1960s. The songs were selected from that period of Sinatra's career when he was recording thematic albums that explored emotions of separation and heartache—albums such as Where Are You? (1957), which includes four of the songs on Shadows, No One Cares (1959), and All Alone (1962). Most of the songs are Tin Pan Alley standards, delivered in a slow to mid-tempo pace, that "often luxuriate in melancholy" and communicate a sense of loneliness. The arrangements center on Dylan's vocals supported throughout by Donny Herron's gliding pedal-steel guitar and Tony Garnier's bass.

Shadows in the Night was recorded in 2014 at Capitol Studios in studio B, where Frank Sinatra often recorded his albums. According to the album's recording engineer, Al Schmitt, the songs on Shadows were recorded live with Dylan singing and his five-man touring band performing the songs in the same room at the same time without headphones. Dylan did not want to see any microphones other than the one he was using for his vocals, so Schmitt had to set up the rest of the microphones away from the instruments. The acoustic bass microphone was eight feet from the bass, and set down and away so it could not be seen; the same approach was taken for the acoustic guitar. For the electric guitar and pedal steel, Schmitt placed the microphones close to the amplifiers, which were set off to the side.

According to Schmitt, recording sessions typically were held from 3:00 pm to 6:00 pm, and then after a two-hour break, an evening session was held from 8:00 pm to around 10:30 pm. They worked Monday through Friday with weekends off. Dylan prepared each session by listening to the Sinatra recordings, according to Schmitt, who noted:

He would listen to the songs over and over and get Sinatra's intention on what he was doing with the song. Then he would only do two or three takes on each tune, but he would make it his own. It had nothing to do with Sinatra. He'd just learn what the song was about and whatever. It was an interesting way to work.

A total of 23 songs were recorded, from which ten were chosen for the album.

== Artwork ==
The cover art for Shadows in the Night presents images and a design that evoke the early 1960s. The front cover incorporates a photo of Dylan in a thoughtful pose in formal attire, presented in shadow behind a vertical-bar design that emulates the cover of jazz trumpeter Freddie Hubbard's 1962 Blue Note album Hub-Tones. The back cover photo shows Dylan and a masked woman, both in formal wear, sitting at a small nightclub table looking at a seven-inch Sun Records single. Their appearance may allude to the 1966 Black and White Ball, a masked ball attended by Frank Sinatra and his wife Mia Farrow, both of whom wore masks at the event. As with many of Dylan's albums in the 21st century, the packaging features minimal credits and no printed lyrics.

== Release and promotion ==
Bob Dylan in the film noir-inspired music video for "The Night We Called It a Day"

Shadows in the Night was released by Columbia Records on February 3, 2015. Dylan had teased the album's release by making his version of "Full Moon and Empty Arms" available to stream on his official website beginning on May 13, 2014 and by performing "Stay with Me (Theme from The Cardinal)" in concert beginning on October 26, 2014. The album was officially announced on December 9, 2014, and two singles, "Full Moon and Empty Arms" and "Stay with Me", were released the following month.

Just prior to the album's release, a Dylan publicist announced that 50,000 free copies of the CD would be given away to randomly selected readers of AARP The Magazine, a bi-monthly periodical that focuses on issues related to aging. Dylan's representatives also reached out to Robert Love, editor in chief of the magazine, requesting an interview. In the interview, Dylan said he wanted to make this album ever since hearing Willie Nelson's standards album Stardust in the 1970s. Dylan also spoke about his admiration for Frank Sinatra:

When you start doing these songs, Frank's got to be on your mind. Because he is the mountain. That's the mountain you have to climb, even if you only get part of the way there. And it's hard to find a song he did not do ... People talk about Frank all the time. He had this ability to get inside of the song in a sort of a conversational way. Frank sang to you—not at you. I never wanted to be a singer that sings at somebody. I’ve always wanted to sing to somebody. ... Certainly nobody worshipped Sinatra in the '60s like they did in the '40s. But he never went away—all those other things that we thought were here to stay, they did go away. But he never did.

Dylan's intention, however, was not to record a mere collection of cover songs or a Sinatra tribute. In a statement he explained, "I don't see myself as covering these songs in any way. They've been covered enough. Buried, as a matter a fact. What me and my band are basically doing is uncovering them. Lifting them out of the grave and bringing them into the light of day".

Nash Edgerton, who had directed three music videos for Dylan previously, directed an official music video for "The Night We Called It a Day". The video, which starred Dylan and actor Robert Davi, was shot in high-contrast black and white and featured a crime plot meant to evoke classic Hollywood film noirs of the 1940s and 1950s.

Dylan also promoted the album by performing "The Night We Called It a Day" on the Late Show with David Letterman on May 19, 2015. USA Today described the performance as "haunting and beautiful, sung in a world-weary voice of a man who’s finally given up the chase. His vocal abilities proved incorrect those terrible, 50-year-old jokes about Dylan not being able to carry a tune — Bob can sing when he wants to". Some critics noted that the song selection seemed "fitting" given that it was Letterman's penultimate show as a late-night talk-show host.

== Reception ==
Professional ratings
Aggregate scores
Source	Rating
AnyDecentMusic?	7.9/10
Metacritic	82/100
Review scores
Source	Rating
AllMusic	4/5 stars
The A.V. Club	B+
The Daily Telegraph	5/5 stars
Entertainment Weekly	B
The Guardian	5/5 stars
The Independent	4/5 stars
Mojo	5/5 stars
Pitchfork	6.2/10
Rolling Stone	4/5 stars
Spin	7/10

If Tempest was hellfire apocalypse romance, prophesied steampunk armageddon, then Shadows in the Night is the revelation of the true nature of the American songbook...Dylan is rearranging, channeling, reinterpreting American musics, a magus, like he has been for decades.

Ben Roylance in review of Shadows in the Night

Shadows in the Night was met with widespread critical acclaim. At Metacritic, which assigns a normalized rating out of 100 to reviews from critics, the album received an average score of 82, based on 31 reviews. AllMusic critic Stephen Thomas Erlewine wrote: "The fact that the feel is so richly idiosyncratic is a testament to just how well he knows these tunes, and these slow, winding arrangements are why Shadows in the Night feels unexpectedly resonant: it's a testament to how deeply Dylan sees himself in these old songs".

Kenneth Partridge, in Billboard magazine, gave the album four out of five stars, noting that Dylan was "singing like a guy who has seen it all and found truth in timeless poetry that belongs to everyone". Partridge also observed, "Dylan has always loved American mythology and all things archaic, and his best songs on recent albums have been rooted in pre-rock pop. When he gets wistful on "The Night We Called It a Day" or grabs hold of moonbeams on the South Pacific favorite "Some Enchanted Evening", he's natural and sincere". Alexis Petridis of The Guardian praised the album, stating that "it may be the most straightforwardly enjoyable album Dylan's made since Time Out of Mind". Jesse Cataldo of Slant Magazine thought that the album "deepens the innate sorrow of these old tunes by establishing them on a long, irregular continuum, possessing the same inherent mutability as the folk songs of Dylan's early days".

Writing for The A.V. Club, Corbin Reiff summed up the unexpected album by writing, "You can chalk it up as another instance of one of the most capricious artists in pop music history doing what he felt like. Take it or leave it". Paste magazine critic Douglas Heselgrave stated that "Every performance on Shadows in the Night expresses a level of vocal maturity and intuition that he's never quite reached before". David Fricke of Rolling Stone magazine described the album as "quietly provocative and compelling", observing that "Dylan transforms everything on Shadows in the Night into a barely-there noir of bowed bass and throaty shivers of electric guitar". Jon Pareles of The New York Times gave the album a positive review, writing: "Mr. Dylan presents yet another changed voice: not the wrathful scrape of his recent albums, but a subdued, sustained tone." Pareles further stated: "Even when it falters, Shadows in the Night maintains its singular mood: lovesick, haunted, suspended between an inconsolable present and all the regrets of the past".

In his review for The Daily Telegraph, Neil McCormick described the work as "quite gorgeous" and "spooky, bittersweet, mesmerisingly moving" with "the best singing from Dylan in 25 years". McCormick also praised Dylan's "delicate, tender and precise" singing that somehow "focuses the songs, compelling listeners to address their interior world in a way glissando prettiness might disguise".

Some critics were less impressed. Writing for Pitchfork, Stephen Deusner argued that the covers lack Sinatra's "sophisticated humor, feisty insight, or infectious rhythm", instead sounding "emotionally muted" and monotonously played, "sacrificing any sense of rhythm for stately ambience". More critical was Robert Christgau, who played the album several times before finding it "painful". He later complained that the singer's voice sounds "permanently shot" and that "the Sinatra-style pop canon Dylan has devoted himself to lately does generally require some show of mellifluousness and pitch control".

NJArts critic Jay Lustig admitted that while he didn't understand why Dylan recorded Shadows in the Night, he did "like his tender, sensitively phrased version of Cy Coleman and Joseph McCarthy’s “Why Try to Change Me Now", which he cited as his favorite track on the album.

Two songs from the album made Rolling Stone's 2020 list of Dylan's 25 best songs of the 21st century: "Stay with Me" placed 25th and "Autumn Leaves" placed 22nd. Writing about the latter song, critic Angie Martoccio noted that it "fits in with his originals better than nearly anything else from this period", an opinion underscored by the fact that "Autumn Leaves" is Dylan's most frequently played cover song of all time (with 237 total live performances). Spectrum Culture also included "Autumn Leaves" on a 2020 list of "Bob Dylan's 20 Best Songs of the '10s and Beyond". It was the only song from Dylan's three albums of traditional pop standards, out of 52 from which to choose, that made the list.

In a 2021 essay, Larry Starr compared Dylan's performance on the album's final track, "That Lucky Old Sun", not to Sinatra's version (which was recorded in 1949 when Sinatra was "a full-throated singer in his early prime") but rather to Sinatra's 1979 recording of the "Theme from New York, New York", which became his last top 40 hit in 1980. Starr claims that the 73-year-old Dylan's vocal performance on "That Lucky Old Sun" is "analogous" to the way that the 64-year-old Sinatra "becomes audibly more energized and 'younger'" as the "Theme from New York, New York" progresses: "Dylan smooths out his voice, relishing and prolonging all the long, open vowels every time he sings 'roll around heaven all day', as if he is transfigured by the vision. It is a striking performance, and wonderful conclusion for an album that is characterized throughout by a deep respect for the chosen repertoire".

A 2015 USA Today article ranking "every Bob Dylan song" placed "That Lucky Old Sun" 56th (out of 359), calling it "[t]he highlight of Dylan’s surprisingly great album of classics from the American songbook". Critic Ray Padgett also considers "That Lucky Old Sun" to be the highlight of Shadows in the Night (as well as the best of all 52 of the songs that appear on Dylan's American Songbook albums).

=== Commercial performance ===
The album debuted at No. 1 on the UK Albums Chart, selling 22,031 in its first week. At the age of 73, Bob Dylan was the oldest male solo artist to chart at No. 1 in the UK, until the record was beaten by Paul Simon in 2016 for Stranger to Stranger. Dylan also holds the record for the longest span between No. 1 albums with 51 years, having first topped the chart with The Freewheelin' Bob Dylan in 1963.

In the US, the album debuted at No. 7 on the Billboard 200, and No. 1 on the Top Rock Albums chart, selling 50,000 copies in its first week. As of April 2016, the album has sold 151,000 copies in the U.S.

== Track listing ==
Shadows in the Night track listing
No.	Title	Writer(s)	Length
1.	"I'm a Fool to Want You"	Frank Sinatra, Jack Wolf, Joel Herron	4:51
2.	"The Night We Called It a Day"	Matt Dennis, Tom Adair	3:24
3.	"Stay with Me"	Jerome Moross, Carolyn Leigh	2:56
4.	"Autumn Leaves"	Joseph Kosma, Jacques Prévert (Original French lyrics), Johnny Mercer (English lyrics)	3:02
5.	"Why Try to Change Me Now"	Cy Coleman, Joseph McCarthy	3:38
6.	"Some Enchanted Evening"	Oscar Hammerstein II, Richard Rodgers	3:28
7.	"Full Moon and Empty Arms"	Buddy Kaye, Ted Mossman, Sergei Rachmaninoff	3:26
8.	"Where Are You?"	Harold Adamson, Jimmy McHugh	3:37
9.	"What'll I Do"	Irving Berlin	3:21
10.	"That Lucky Old Sun"	Haven Gillespie, Beasley Smith	3:39
Total length:			35:17

== Personnel ==
- Bob Dylan – vocals, production

Additional musicians

- Daniel Fornero – trumpet
- Tony Garnier – upright bass
- Larry G. Hall – trumpet
- Dylan Hart – French horn
- Donnie Herron – pedal steel guitar
- Alan Kaplan – trombone
- Stu Kimball – guitar
- Andrew Martin – trombone
- Joseph Meyer – French horn
- George Receli – percussion
- Charlie Sexton – guitar
- Francisco Torres – trombone

Technical personnel

- Geoff Gans – album design
- Steve Genewick – assistant engineering
- D. I. Harper – horns arrangement
- Al Schmitt – recording, mixing
- Doug Sax – mastering
- John Shearer – photography

== Chart performance ==
=== Weekly charts ===
Chart (2015)	Peak position
Australian Albums (ARIA)	8
Austrian Albums (Ö3 Austria)	3
Belgian Albums (Ultratop Flanders)	3
Danish Albums (Hitlisten)	4
Dutch Albums (Album Top 100)	2
Finnish Albums (Suomen virallinen lista)	8
German Albums (Offizielle Top 100)	6
Irish Albums (IRMA)	1
Italian Albums (FIMI)	6
New Zealand Albums (RMNZ)	7
Norwegian Albums (VG-lista)	1
Polish Albums (ZPAV)	6
Portuguese Albums (AFP)	6
Spanish Albums (Promusicae)	3
Swedish Albums (Sverigetopplistan)	1
Swiss Albums (Schweizer Hitparade)	2
UK Albums (Official Charts)	1
US Billboard 200	7
US Americana/Folk Albums (Billboard)	1
US Top Rock Albums (Billboard)	1

=== Year-end charts ===
Chart (2015)	Position
Belgian Albums (Ultratop Flanders)	60
Dutch Albums (Album Top 100)	59
Swedish Albums (Sverigetopplistan)	72
US Folk Albums (Billboard)	6
US Top Rock Albums (Billboard)	29
