= Transition Records =

Jazz record company and label based in Cambridge, Massachusetts

- Founded: 1955
- Founder: Tom Wilson
- Defunct: 1957
- Genre: Jazz, folk
- Country of origin: U.S.
- Location: Cambridge, Massachusetts

Transition Records was a jazz record company and label based in Cambridge, Massachusetts established by Tom Wilson in 1955. A short lived label, Transition announced several albums which were left unreleased, including recordings by Jo Mapes, Yusef Lateef, Pepper Adams and Curtis Fuller, Charles Mingus, Jay Migliori, and Sheila Jordan.

The master for Here Comes Louis Smith (1958) by trumpeter Louis Smith was sold to Blue Note Records, while an unissued Sun Ra recording made by Transition was later released in 1968 by Delmark Records as Sound of Joy. A 1955 session featuring Pepper Adams and John Coltrane was recorded by Transition, but only one song was released on their compilation Jazz in Transition (1956). The recordings were later issued by Blue Note on High Step (1975).

== Discography ==
Catalog number	Artist	Title
TRLP 1	Herb Pomeroy	Jazz in a Stable
TRLP 2	Johnny Windhurst	Jazz at Columbus Ave.
TRLP 4	Donald Byrd	Byrd's Eye View
TRLP 5	Donald Byrd	Byrd Jazz
TRLP 10	Sun Ra	Jazz by Sun Ra
TRLP 15	Russell Woollen	Quartet for Flute and Strings
TRLP 17	Donald Byrd	Byrd Blows on Beacon Hill
TRLP 19	Cecil Taylor	Jazz Advance
TRLP 20	Doug Watkins	Watkins at Large
TRLP 21	Lucky Thompson	Lucky Strikes!
TRLP 23	Dartmouth Indian Chiefs	Chiefly Jazz
TRLP 27	Fran Thorne	Piano Reflections
TRLP 30	Various Artists	Jazz in Transition
TRLP F-1	Sam Gary	Sam Gary Sings
TRLP M-1	Lovey Powell and Brooks Morton	Lovelady
