= The Bootleg Series Vol. 6: Bob Dylan Live 1964, Concert at Philharmonic Hall =

Live album by Bob Dylan
- Released: March 30, 2004
- Recorded: October 31, 1964
- Venue: Philharmonic Hall, Manhattan
- Genre: Folk; folk rock
- Length: 104:12
- Label: Columbia
- Producer: Steve Berkowitz; Jeff Rosen

Bob Dylan chronology
The Bootleg Series Vol. 5: Bob Dylan Live 1975, The Rolling Thunder Revue (2002)	The Bootleg Series Vol. 6: Bob Dylan Live 1964, Concert at Philharmonic Hall (2004)	The Bootleg Series Vol. 7: No Direction Home: The Soundtrack (2005)

Bob Dylan Bootleg Series chronology
Vol. 5: Bob Dylan Live 1975, The Rolling Thunder Revue (2002)	Vol. 6: Bob Dylan Live 1964, Concert at Philharmonic Hall (2004)	Vol. 7: No Direction Home: The Soundtrack (2005)

Professional ratings
Review scores
Source	Rating
Allmusic	4/5 stars
The Encyclopedia of Popular Music	4/5 stars
Music Box	5/5 stars
Pitchfork Media	9.1/10
Tiny Mix Tapes	5/5 stars
NME	10/10

The Bootleg Series Vol. 6: Bob Dylan Live 1964, Concert at Philharmonic Hall is a live album by Bob Dylan, released in 2004 on Legacy Records. It is the fourth installment of the ongoing Bob Dylan Bootleg Series. The album is the complete recording from the October 31, 1964 "Halloween" show at Philharmonic Hall in Manhattan by Bob Dylan.

== Concert ==
The set list was dominated by Dylan's protest songs, including "The Times They Are a-Changin'," "A Hard Rain's a-Gonna Fall", and "The Lonesome Death of Hattie Carroll". Joan Baez, a major supporter of Dylan's in his early career, duets with Dylan on three songs, as well as singing another alone ("Silver Dagger", to which Dylan contributes harmonica). However, Dylan performed these songs alongside early versions of three songs from the soon-to-be-recorded Bringing It All Back Home. New compositions like "It's Alright Ma (I'm Only Bleeding)" and "Mr. Tambourine Man" showed Dylan moving in a new direction, becoming more immersed in evocative, stream-of-consciousness lyrics and moving away from social, topical songwriting. Even as he was moving in this new direction, Dylan was still portrayed as a symbol of the civil rights and anti-war movements, and the Halloween concert of 1964 caught Dylan in transition.

The album debuted on the Billboard 200 chart on April 17, 2004, at number 28 and spent four weeks on the chart. It also reached number 33 in the U.K.

== Preparation ==
When Dylan and Sony began planning for The Bootleg Series Vol. 6, they were not sure what to release. Steve Berkowitz, an A&R head at Sony Music who worked on all the Bootleg Series discs with Dylan's office, stressed that Dylan's office, not Sony, was behind the brainstorming and decision-making for the Bootleg Series. Concerts held at Carnegie Hall and New York's Town Hall, both in 1963, were considered for The Bootleg Series Vol. 6, according to Berkowitz, but they were ultimately rejected.

The Halloween concert of 1964 had been previously bootlegged on vinyl and CD, but those releases were incomplete and taken from poor dubs of the soundboard tapes. The Bootleg Series Vol. 6 presented the entire concert for the first time from the original master tapes.

The set was well received by most critics, with NME's Rob Fitzpatrick giving it the magazine's highest rating (a 10 out of 10) and calling it "utterly brilliant".

In 2016, the set was reissued by the Audio Fidelity label as "Live 1964", on two 5.1 multi-channel SACDs.

== Track listing ==
All tracks are written by Bob Dylan, except where noted.

Disc one
No.	Title	Length
1.	"The Times They Are a-Changin'"	3:29
2.	"Spanish Harlem Incident"	3:07
3.	"Talkin' John Birch Paranoid Blues"	4:06
4.	"To Ramona"	6:01
5.	"Who Killed Davey Moore?"	4:46
6.	"Gates of Eden"	8:32
7.	"If You Gotta Go, Go Now (Or Else You Got to Stay All Night)"	4:06
8.	"It's Alright, Ma (I'm Only Bleeding)"	11:26
9.	"I Don't Believe You (She Acts Like We Never Have Met)"	4:01
10.	"Mr. Tambourine Man"	6:33
11.	"A Hard Rain's a-Gonna Fall"	7:44
Total length:		63:51

Disc two
No.	Title	Length
1.	"Talkin' World War III Blues"	5:52
2.	"Don't Think Twice, It's All Right"	4:34
3.	"The Lonesome Death of Hattie Carroll"	6:57
4.	"Mama, You Been on My Mind"	3:35
5.	"Silver Dagger" (traditional)	3:47
6.	"With God on Our Side"	6:17
7.	"It Ain't Me, Babe"	5:11
8.	"All I Really Want to Do"	4:01
Total length:		40:20

== Personnel ==
- Bob Dylan — vocal, guitar, harmonica
- Joan Baez — vocal on "Mama, You Been on My Mind," "Silver Dagger," "With God on Our Side," and "It Ain't Me, Babe"

Production personnel

- Tom Wilson — original recordings supervisor
- Steven Berkowitz, Jeff Rosen — producers
- Michael H. Brauer, Nat Chan — mixing engineers
- Greg Calbi — mastering engineer

== Charts ==
Chart performance for The Bootleg Series Vol. 6: Bob Dylan Live 1964, Concert at Philharmonic Hall
Chart (2004)	Peak position
Austrian Albums (Ö3 Austria)	52
Belgian Albums (Ultratop Flanders)	77
Dutch Albums (Album Top 100)	52
French Albums (SNEP)	99
German Albums (Offizielle Top 100)	61
Italian Albums (FIMI)	35
Norwegian Albums (VG-lista)	12
Swedish Albums (Sverigetopplistan)	18
UK Albums (OCC)	33
US Billboard 200	28
