= Byrd Blows on Beacon Hill =

Studio album by Donald Byrd
- Released: 1957
- Recorded: May 7, 1956; Beacon Hill, Boston, Massachusetts
- Genre: Jazz
- Length: 31:28
- Label: Transition; TRLP 17
- Producer: Tom Wilson

Donald Byrd chronology
Byrd's Eye View (1955)	Byrd Blows on Beacon Hill (1957)	2 Trumpets (1956)

Byrd Blows on Beacon Hill is an album by trumpeter Donald Byrd recorded at Steve Fassett's Home on Beacon Hill in Boston in 1956 and originally released on Tom Wilson's Transition label in 1957. The album was later released as part of the compilation The Transition Sessions.

== Reception ==
Professional ratings
Review scores
Source	Rating
Allmusic	3/5 stars

In his review for Allmusic, Thom Jurek stated " Byrd establishes himself here as an individual voice on the trumpet and as a leader as well... While this date may not be of interest to Byrd's soul-jazz fans, it will no doubt enlighten those who are partial to Byrd's early Blue Note material".

== Track listing ==
1. "Little Rock Getaway" (Joe Sullivan) - 7:04
2. "Polka Dots and Moonbeams" (Johnny Burke, Jimmy Van Heusen) - 7:20
3. "People Will Say We're in Love" (Oscar Hammerstein II, Richard Rodgers) - 3:39
4. "If I Love Again" (Jack Murray, Ben Oakland) - 4:41
5. "What's New?" (Burke, Bob Haggart) - 5:02
6. "Stella by Starlight" (Ned Washington, Victor Young) - 3:42

== Personnel ==
- Donald Byrd - trumpet
- Ray Santisi - piano
- Doug Watkins - bass
- Jimmy Zitano - drums
