= Here Comes Louis Smith =

Studio album by Louis Smith
- Released: March/April 1958
- Recorded: February 4 & 9, 1958
- Studio: Audio Sonic Sound, Brill Building, NYC
- Genre: Jazz
- Length: 42:17
- Label: Blue Note; BLP 1584
- Producer: Tom Wilson

Louis Smith chronology
Here Comes Louis Smith (1958)	Smithville (1958)

Here Comes Louis Smith is the debut album by American trumpeter Louis Smith recorded on February 4 & 9, 1958 for Transition, but the company went out of business before release; the album masters were acquired by Blue Note's Alfred Lion and released shortly after on Blue Note that same year.

== Reception ==
Professional ratings
Review scores
Source	Rating
AllMusic	4.5/5 stars

The AllMusic review by Scott Yanow says. "Louis Smith had a brilliant debut on this Blue Note album, his first of two before becoming a full-time teacher."

== Track listing ==
All tracks are written by Louis Smith, except as noted.

Side 1
No.	Title	Writer(s)	Date recorded	Length
1.	"Tribute to Brownie"	Duke Pearson	February 4, 1958	6:38
2.	"Brill's Blues"		February 4, 1958	8:22
3.	"Ande"		February 9, 1958	6:42

Side 2
No.	Title	Writer(s)	Date recorded	Length
1.	"Stardust"	Hoagy Carmichael	February 9, 1958	5:20
2.	"South Side"		February 4, 1958	8:38
3.	"Val's Blues"		February 9, 1958	6:37

== Personnel ==
- Louis Smith – trumpet
- Cannonball Adderley (credited as "Buckshot La Funke") – alto saxophone (except "Stardust")
- Duke Jordan (February 4, 1958), Tommy Flanagan (February 9, 1958) – piano
- Doug Watkins – bass
- Art Taylor – drums
