= Blue Lights, Vols. 1 & 2 =

Blue Lights
- Volume 1

Studio album by Kenny Burrell
- Released: 1958
- Recorded: May 14, 1958
- Studios: Manhattan Towers; New York City
- Genre: Jazz
- Labels: Blue Note; BLP 1596 (Vol. 1); BLP 1597 (Vol. 2)
- Producer: Alfred Lion

Kenny Burrell chronology
Kenny Burrell and John Coltrane (1958)	Blue Lights (1958)	On View at the Five Spot Cafe (1959)

Blue Lights
- Volume 2

Blue Lights, Volumes 1&2
- 1997 CD reissue

Blue Lights, Vols. 1 & 2 are a pair of separate but related albums by American jazz guitarist Kenny Burrell recorded on May 14, 1958 and released by Blue Note later that year.

== Background ==
=== Artwork ===
The cover features artwork by Andy Warhol.

=== Release history ===
The albums were subsequently reissued in 1997 with a re-ordered track sequence as separate CDs and a two disc set combining Volume 1 and Volume 2.

== Reception ==
Professional ratings
Review scores
Source	Rating
DownBeat	4/5 stars
AllMusic	4.5/5 stars

The AllMusic review by Scott Yanow states, "Guitarist Kenny Burrell leads a very coherent jam session in the studio with a particularly strong cast."

Referring to Blue Lights, Vol. 2, George Kanzler of The Ann Arbor News deemed it one of Burrell's jam session albums, this one chiefly notable for Art Blakey's "incendiary drumming" and "the sterling trumpet work of the now forgotten Louis Smith."

== Track listing ==
=== Blue Lights, Volume 1 ===
All tracks are written by Kenny Burrell, except as noted.

Side 1
No.	Title	Writer(s)	Length
1.	"Yes Baby"		11:15
2.	"Scotch Blues"	Duke Jordan	8:00
Total length:			19:15

Side 2
No.	Title	Writer(s)	Length
1.	"Autumn in New York"	Vernon Duke	5:44
2.	"Caravan"	Duke Ellington; Irving Mills; Juan Tizol	9:55
Total length:			15:39 34:54

=== Blue Lights, Volume 2 ===
All tracks are written by Kenny Burrell, except as noted.

Side 1
No.	Title	Writer(s)	Length
1.	"Rock Salt"		11:19
2.	"The Man I Love"	George Gershwin; Ira Gershwin	6:47
Total length:			18:06

Side 2
No.	Title	Writer(s)	Length
1.	"Chuckin'"	Sam Jones	12:10
2.	"Phinupi"		9:47
Total length:			21:57 40:03

=== Blue Lights, Volumes 1&2 – 1997 CD reissue ===
Disc one
No.	Title	Writer(s)	Length
1.	"Phinupi"		9:47
2.	"Yes Baby"		11:15
3.	"Scotch Blues"	Duke Jordan	8:00
4.	"The Man I Love"	George Gershwin; Ira Gershwin	6:47
5.	"I Never Knew" (bonus track)	Ted Fio Rito; Gus Kahn	12:37
Total length:			48:26

Disc two
No.	Title	Writer(s)	Length
1.	"Caravan"	Duke Ellington; Irving Mills; Juan Tizol	9:55
2.	"Chuckin'"	Sam Jones	12:10
3.	"Rock Salt"		11:19
4.	"Autumn in New York"	Vernon Duke	5:44
Total length:			39:08

== Personnel ==
=== Musicians ===
- Kenny Burrell – guitar
- Louis Smith – trumpet
- Tina Brooks (except tracks 1-1, 1-4, 2-4), Junior Cook (except tracks 1-4, 2-4) – tenor saxophone
- Duke Jordan (disc one), Bobby Timmons (disc two) – piano
- Sam Jones – bass
- Art Blakey – drums

=== Technical personnel ===
==== Original ====
- Alfred Lion – producer
- Rudy Van Gelder – recording engineer
- Reid Miles – cover design
- Andy Warhol – cover illustration
- Robert Levin – liner notes

==== Reissue ====
- Michael Cuscuna – reissue producer
- Ron McMaster – digital transfers
- Patrick Roques – redesign

== Charts ==
Chart performance for Blue Lights, Vol. 1
Chart (2026)	Peak position
UK Jazz & Blues Albums (Official Charts)	23
