= Another Side of Bob Dylan =

Studio album by Bob Dylan
- Released: August 8, 1964
- Recorded: June 9, 1964
- Studios: Columbia 7th Ave, New York City
- Genre: Folk
- Length: 50:37
- Label: Columbia
- Producer: Tom Wilson

Bob Dylan chronology
The Times They Are a-Changin' (1964)	Another Side of Bob Dylan (1964)	Bringing It All Back Home (1965)

Another Side of Bob Dylan is the fourth studio album by the American singer and songwriter Bob Dylan, released on August 8, 1964, by Columbia Records.

The album deviates from the more socially conscious style which Dylan had developed with his previous LP, The Times They Are A-Changin' (1964). The change prompted criticism from some influential figures in the folk community – Sing Out! editor Irwin Silber complained that Dylan had "somehow lost touch with people" and was caught up in "the paraphernalia of fame".

Despite the album's thematic shift, Dylan performed the entirety of Another Side of Bob Dylan solo, as he had previous records. In addition to his usual acoustic guitar and harmonica, Dylan provides piano on one track, "Black Crow Blues". Another Side of Bob Dylan reached No. 43 in the United States (although it eventually went gold), and peaked at No. 8 on the UK charts in 1965.

A high-definition 5.1 surround sound edition of the album was released on SACD by Columbia in 2003.

== Writing ==
Throughout 1963, Dylan worked on a novel and a play. A number of publishers were interested in signing Dylan to a contract, and at one point, City Lights (a small but prestigious company specializing in poetry) was strongly considered. However, as Dylan worked on his book at a casual pace, his manager, Albert Grossman, decided to make a deal with a major publisher.

Macmillan's senior editor, Bob Markel, said, "We gave [Dylan] an advance for an untitled book of writings ... The publisher was taking a risk on a young, untested potential phenomenon." When Markel met with Dylan for the first time, "there was no book at the time ... The material at that point was hazy, sketchy. The poetry editor called it 'inaccessible.' The symbolism was not easily understood, but on the other hand it was earthy, filled with obscure but marvelous imagery ... I felt it had a lot of value and was very different from Dylan's output till then. [But] it was not a book."

It would be years before Dylan finished his book, but the free form poetry experiments that came from it eventually influenced his songwriting. The most notable example came in a six-line coda to a poem responding to President John F. Kennedy's assassination (which took place on November 22, 1963):

the colors of Friday were dull / as cathedral bells were gently burnin / strikin for the gentle / strikin for the kind / strikin for the crippled ones / an strikin for the blind

This refrain would soon appear in a very important composition, "Chimes of Freedom", and, as biographer Clinton Heylin writes, "with this sad refrain, Dylan would pass from topical troubadour to poet of the road."

In February 1964, Dylan embarked on a 20-day trip across the United States. Riding in a station wagon with a few friends (Paul Clayton, Victor Maymudes, and Pete Karman), Dylan began the trip in New York, taking numerous detours through many states before ending the trip in California. (At one point, Dylan reportedly paid a visit to poet Carl Sandburg.) "We talked to people in bars, miners," Dylan would later say. "Talking to people – that's where it's at, man."

According to Heylin, "the primary motivation for this trip was to find enough inspiration to step beyond the folk-song form, if not in the bars, or from the miners, then by peering deep into himself." Dylan spent much time in the back of the station wagon, working on songs and possibly poetry on a typewriter. It was during this trip that Dylan composed "Chimes of Freedom", finishing it in time to premiere at a Denver concert on the 15th. "Mr. Tambourine Man" was also composed during this trip.

It was also during this trip that the Beatles arrived in America. Their first visit to the United States remains a touchstone in American culture. Maymudes recalled how Dylan "nearly jumped out the car" when "I Wanna Hold Your Hand" came on the radio and his comments: "Did you hear that?..that was fuckin' great! Oh man.." and how Dylan seemed lost in thought replaying the record over in his head. Dylan, however, had already been following the Beatles since 1963. There have been different accounts regarding Dylan's attitude towards the Beatles at this time, but it is known that Suze Rotolo and Al Aronowitz immediately took to them and championed their music to Dylan. Aronowitz later claimed that Dylan dismissed them as "bubblegum", but in an interview in 1971, Dylan recalls being impressed by their music. "We were driving through Colorado, we had the radio on, and eight of the Top 10 songs were Beatles songs ... 'I Wanna Hold Your Hand,' all those early ones. They were doing things nobody was doing. Their chords were outrageous, just outrageous, and their harmonies made it all valid ... I knew they were pointing the direction of where music had to go." In January 1964, while the Beatles were in France, George Harrison bought the French release of The Freewheelin' Bob Dylan (1963), titled En Roue Libre, which they played repeatedly, impressed by the lyrics and "just the attitude!"

As the Beatles began to influence Dylan and vice versa, Dylan's personal life was undergoing a number of significant changes. When Dylan returned to New York in March, he rented an electric guitar. He continued his romance with folksinger Joan Baez, though their stage appearances together began to dwindle. Dylan's girlfriend Suze Rotolo apparently had had enough of the affair. Soon after Dylan returned to New York, the two had an argument. At the time, Suze was staying with her sister Carla, and when Carla intervened, Dylan began screaming at Carla. Carla ordered Dylan to leave, but he refused to go. Carla Rotolo pushed Dylan, and he pushed her back. The two of them were soon practically fighting. Friends were called and Dylan had to be forcibly removed, effectively ending his relationship with Suze Rotolo. In a 1966 interview, Dylan admitted that after their relationship ended, "I got very, very strung out for a while. I mean, really, very strung out."

One account of Dylan's first experience with psychedelics places it in April 1964; producer Paul Rothchild told Bob Spitz that he was present when Dylan took his first hit of LSD. By February 1964, Dylan was already telling his friends that "Rimbaud's where it's at. That's the kind of stuff means something. That's the kind of writing I'm gonna do." A nineteenth-century French poet, Rimbaud once wrote to his mentor Georges Izambard in May 1871 that "the poet makes himself a seer by a long, prodigious and rational disordering of the senses ... He reaches [for] the unknown and even if, crazed, he ends up by losing the understanding of his visions, at least he has seen them."

Dylan later left for Europe, completing a few performances in England before traveling to Paris where he was introduced to a German model, Christa Päffgen, who went by the name of Nico. After treating Dylan to a meal at her flat, Nico accompanied Dylan across Europe, a trip that passed through Germany before ending in Vouliagmeni, a small village outside of Athens, Greece. Dylan stayed at Vouliagmeni for more than a week, finishing many of the songs that would appear on his fourth and upcoming album. Nine songs of these would be recorded upon his return to New York: "All I Really Want to Do", "Spanish Harlem Incident", "To Ramona", "I Shall Be Free No. 10", "Ballad in Plain D", "It Ain't Me, Babe", "Mama, You Been on My Mind", "Denise Denise", and "Black Crow Blues". Dylan also completed another song called "I'll Keep It With Mine", which, according to Nico, was "about me and my little baby". Dylan gave the song to Nico, who would eventually record it for her own album, Chelsea Girl, released in 1967.

== Recording ==
With Dylan's commercial profile on the rise, Columbia was now urging Dylan to release a steady stream of recordings. Upon Dylan's return to New York, studio time was quickly scheduled, with Tom Wilson back as producer.

The first (and only) recording session was held June 9 at Columbia's Studio A, located at 799 Seventh Avenue in New York City. According to Heylin, "while polishing off a couple of bottles of Beaujolais", Dylan recorded 14 original compositions, in a single three-hour session between 7pm and 10pm that night, 11 of which were chosen for the final album. The three that were ultimately rejected were "Denise Denise", "Mr. Tambourine Man", and "Mama, You Been on My Mind".

Nat Hentoff's article on Dylan for The New Yorker, published in late October 1964, includes remarkable descriptions of the June 9 session. Hentoff describes in considerable detail the atmosphere in the CBS recording studio and Dylan's own asides and banter with his friends in the studio, with the session's producers, and Hentoff himself.

Ramblin' Jack Elliott was present during part of this session, and Dylan asked him to perform on "Mr. Tambourine Man". "He invited me to sing on it with him," recalls Elliott, "but I didn't know the words 'cept for the chorus, so I just harmonized with him on the chorus." Only one complete take was recorded, with Dylan stumbling on some of the lyrics. Though the recording was ultimately rejected, Dylan would return to the song for his next album.

By the time Dylan recorded what was ultimately the master take of "My Back Pages", it was 1:30 in the morning. Master takes were selected, and after some minor editing, a final album was soon sequenced.

== Songs and themes ==
As Dylan told Nat Hentoff in The New Yorker, "there aren't any finger-pointin' songs" on Another Side of Bob Dylan, which was a significant step in a new direction. Music critic Tim Riley writes, "As a set, the songs constitute a decisive act of noncommitment to issue-bound protest, to tradition-bound folk music and the possessive bonds of its audience [...] The love songs open up into indeterminate statements about the emotional orbits lovers take, and the topical themes pass over artificial moral boundaries and leap into wide-ranging social observation."

"The compassion that laces all the complaints in 'All I Really Want to Do' and 'It Ain't Me, Babe' is round with idealism and humor," writes Riley. "That [both songs] work off a pure Jimmie Rodgers yodel only makes their ties to wide-open American optimism that much more enticing (even though they are both essentially reluctant good-byes)."

"Black Crow Blues" is a traditional twelve-bar blues arrangement with original lyrics.

"'Spanish Harlem Incident' is a new romance that pretends to be short and sweet," writes Riley, "but it's an example of how Dylan begins using uncommon word couplings to evoke the mysteries of intimacy [...] her 'rattling drums' play off his 'restless palms'; her 'pearly eyes' and 'flashing diamond teeth' off his 'pale face.'"

"Chimes of Freedom" can be traced to "Lay Down Your Weary Tune", an outtake from The Times They Are A-Changin' (1964). "Its sense of the power of nature [...] closely mirrors 'Lay Down Your Weary Tune,'" writes Clinton Heylin. "Unashamedly apocalyptic [...] the composition of 'Chimes of Freedom' represented a leap in form that permitted even more intensely poetic songs to burst forth."

Along with the later track "Motorpsycho Nitemare", the lyrics on "I Shall Be Free No. 10" have been referred to as "surrealistic talking blues".

Described by Heylin as "the most realized song on Another Side", "To Ramona" is one of the most celebrated songs on the album. A soft, tender waltz, Riley writes that the song "extends the romance from ideals of emotional honesty out into issues of conditioned conformity ('From fixtures and forces and friends / That you gotta be just like them') [...] in 'Spanish Harlem Incident,' [Dylan's] using flattery as a front for the singer's own weak self-image; in 'To Ramona,' he's trying to save his lover from herself if only because he knows he may soon need the same comfort he's giving her."

"Motorpsycho Nitemare", based in part on Alfred Hitchcock's film Psycho (1960), satirizes both the rise of the American '60s counter-culture as well as the mainstream's paranoid reactions to it.

Riley describes "My Back Pages" as "a thorough X-ray of Dylan's former social proselytizing [...] Dylan renounces his former over-serious messianic perch, and disowns false insights. [...] 'I was so much older then / I'm younger than that now.'"

Described by Riley as "the unalloyed sting of a romantic perfidy", "I Don't Believe You (She Acts Like We Never Have Met)" would be dramatically rearranged for a full-electric rock band during Dylan's famous 1966 tour with The Hawks.

According to Heylin, "Ballad in Plain D" takes its melody and refrain ("my friends say unto me...") from the Scottish folk song, "I Once Loved a Lass (The False Bride)". "The song graphically details the night of his breakup with Suze," writes Heylin. "Dylan's portrayal of Carla as the 'parasite sister' remains a cruel and inaccurate portrait of a woman who had started out as one of [Dylan's] biggest fans, and changed only as she came to see the degrees of emotional blackmail he subjected her younger sister to." Asked in 1985 if there were any songs he regretted writing, Dylan singled out "Ballad in Plain D", saying "I look back at that particular one and say ... maybe I could have left that alone."

"It Ain't Me, Babe" also reworks the same "Scarborough Fair" arrangement that was written into Dylan's earlier compositions, "Girl from the North Country" and "Boots of Spanish Leather". Johnny Cash would record his own hit version of this song soon after Another Side of Bob Dylan was released, while The Turtles' version would chart even higher.

Four songs from Another Side of Bob Dylan were eventually recorded by The Byrds: "Chimes of Freedom", "My Back Pages", "Spanish Harlem Incident", and "All I Really Want to Do". In addition, they were introduced to their breakthrough hit single "Mr. Tambourine Man" through a copy of Dylan's unreleased recording from the June 9, 1964 album session. All received their share of critical acclaim.

== Reception ==
As Another Side of Bob Dylan was prepared for release, Dylan premiered his new songs at the Newport Folk Festival in July 1964. The festival also marked Dylan's first meeting with Johnny Cash; Dylan was already an admirer of Cash's music, and vice versa. The two spent a night jamming together in Joan Baez's room at the Viking Motor Inn. According to Cash, "we were so happy to [finally] meet each other that we were jumping on the beds like kids." The next day, Cash performed Dylan's "Don't Think Twice, It's All Right" as part of his set, telling the audience that "we've been doing it on our shows all over the country, trying to tell the folks about Bob, that we think he's the best songwriter of the age since Pete Seeger ... Sure do."

Though the audience at Newport seemed to enjoy Dylan's new material, the folk press did not. Irwin Silber of Sing Out! and David Horowitz criticized Dylan's direction and accused Dylan of succumbing to the pressures/temptations of fame. In an open letter to Dylan published in the November issue of Sing Out!, Silber wrote "your new songs seem to be all inner-directed now, inner-probing, self-conscious" and, based on what he saw at Newport, "that some of the paraphernalia of fame [was] getting in your way." Horowitz called the songs an "unqualified failure of taste and self-critical awareness."

The album was a step back commercially, failing to make the Top 40, indicating that record consumers may have had a problem as well.

Dylan soon defended his work, writing to columnist Ralph J. Gleason that "the songs are insanely honest, not meanin t twist any heads an written only for the reason that i myself me alone wanted and needed t write them [sic]." Phil Ochs also came to Dylan's defense in an open letter for Broadside, opining that his writing was "as brilliant as ever and [...] clearly improving all the time". He praised "Ballad in Plain D" and "It Ain't Me Babe" as "masterpieces of personal statement that have as great a significance as any of his protest material".

== Legacy ==
Professional ratings
Review scores
Source	Rating
AllMusic	5/5 stars
Encyclopedia of Popular Music	4/5 stars
Entertainment Weekly	B+
MusicHound Rock	4/5
The Rolling Stone Album Guide	4.5/5 stars
Tom Hull	A−

Years later, mixed reactions over Another Side of Bob Dylan remained but not for the same reasons. Critics later viewed it as a 'transitional' album. Clinton Heylin claimed that "Dylan was simply too close to the experiences he was drawing upon to translate them into art. He was also still experimenting with the imagery found on 'Chimes of Freedom' and 'Mr. Tambourine Man.' 'My Back Pages,' the least successful example of the new style, was replete with bizarre compound images ('corpse evangelists,' 'confusion boats,' etc.)." Salon.com critic Bill Wyman dismissed it as "a lesser, 'relationship' album", but conceded that "Chimes of Freedom" was a "lovely hymn to the 'countless confused, accused, misused, strung-out ones an' worse'."

However, Tim Riley called it "a bridge between folkie rhetoric (albeit superior) and his troika of electric rants ... a rock album without electric guitars, a folk archetype that punches through the hardy, plainspoken mold. Built on repeated riffs and coaxed by the controlled anxiety of Dylan's voice, the songs work off one another with intellectually charged élan. It's a transition album with a mind of its own." It was voted number 133 in Colin Larkin's All Time Top 1000 Albums 3rd Edition (2000).

== Outtakes ==
A complete take of "Mama, You Been on My Mind" was recorded for the album, but for reasons unknown, it was rejected. Described by Tim Riley as "the echo of a left-behind affair that rebounds off a couple of self-aware curves ('I am not askin' you to say words like 'yes' or 'no,' / ... I'm just breathin' to myself, pretendin' not that I don't know)," the song was soon covered by Joan Baez, as well as Judy Collins, who had a considerable amount of commercial success with it. Dylan's version would not see release until The Bootleg Series Volumes 1–3 (Rare & Unreleased) 1961–1991 in 1991. However, Dylan would periodically perform the song in concert, occasionally with Baez as his duet partner. Rod Stewart would later cover the song for his critically acclaimed album, Never a Dull Moment (1972), and a version by Jeff Buckley appears as an out-take on the 2004 reissue of Grace (1994). Johnny Cash covered the song on his album Orange Blossom Special (1965). It was covered by Linda Ronstadt on her 1969 album Hand Sown ... Home Grown with altered lyrics as "Baby, You've Been on My Mind".

Though "Mr. Tambourine Man" would be re-recorded for Dylan's next album, Sony released the complete take recorded for Another Side of Bob Dylan on The Bootleg Series Vol. 7: No Direction Home: The Soundtrack in 2005. Unlike the familiar version recorded for Bringing It All Back Home (1965), this early version has a harmonica intro as well as Ramblin' Jack Elliott singing harmony vocals on the chorus. It was an acetate copy of this version of the song that found its way to the newly formed Byrds in late 1964, leading to their breakthrough electrified recording of the song.

Dylan also recorded two additional songs that did not make the album. The first is "Denise Denise", a song which uses the same music as "Black Crow Blues" but with different lyrics. The second is "California", which again uses "Black Crow Blues"' music as the basic structure of the song. A small section of the "California" lyrics were reused in "Outlaw Blues", a song that appeared on Dylan's next album, Bringing It All Back Home. Both outtakes are circulating.

== Track listing ==
All tracks are written by Bob Dylan.

Side one
No.	Title	Length
1.	"All I Really Want to Do"	4:04
2.	"Black Crow Blues"	3:14
3.	"Spanish Harlem Incident"	2:24
4.	"Chimes of Freedom"	7:10
5.	"I Shall Be Free No. 10"	4:47
6.	"To Ramona"	3:52
Total length:		25:31

Side two
No.	Title	Length
1.	"Motorpsycho Nitemare"	4:33
2.	"My Back Pages"	4:22
3.	"I Don't Believe You (She Acts Like We Never Have Met)"	4:22
4.	"Ballad in Plain D"	8:16
5.	"It Ain't Me Babe"	3:33
Total length:		25:06

== Personnel ==
- Bob Dylan – vocals, acoustic guitar, piano, harmonica
- Tom Wilson – production

== Charts ==
Chart (1964)	Peak position
UK Albums (Official Charts)	8
US Billboard 200	43

== Certifications ==
Region	Certification	Certified units/sales
United Kingdom (BPI) Sales from 2004	Silver	60,000^{^}
United States (RIAA)	Gold	500,000^{^}
^{^} Shipments figures based on certification alone.

== Bibliography ==
- Heylin, Clinton (April 1, 2011). Behind the Shades: The 20th Anniversary Edition. London: Faber & Faber. ISBN 9780571272419.
- Heylin, Clinton (2009). Revolution in the Air: The Songs of Bob Dylan 1957–1973. Chicago Review Press. ISBN 978-1-55652-843-9.
- Riley, Tim (1992). Hard Rain: A Dylan Commentary. New York: Knopf. ISBN 0-306-80907-9.
