= Jazz Advance =

Studio album by Cecil Taylor
- Released: 1957
- Recorded: September 14, 1956, Boston
- Genre: Jazz
- Label: Transition
- Producer: Tom Wilson

Cecil Taylor chronology
Jazz Advance (1957)	At Newport (1958)

Jazz Advance is the debut album by pianist Cecil Taylor, recorded for the Transition label in September 1956. The album features performances by Taylor with Buell Neidlinger, Denis Charles and Steve Lacy.

== Music ==
The album contains three Taylor originals, three standards, and one standard-to-be, Thelonious Monk's "Bemsha Swing," first recorded only four years before Taylor's version. This track is played "cryptically and succinctly, the lines breaking up into jagged fragments and jutting chords." "Charge 'Em Blues" is in 4/4 time. The chords and light treble playing towards the beginning of "Azure" are similar to the sound of Abdullah Ibrahim, but then "the cross-rhythmic improvised piano patterns clattering chords typical of later Taylor emerge."

== Reception ==
Professional ratings
Review scores
Source	Rating
AllMusic	4.5/5 stars
The Penguin Guide to Jazz Recordings	4/4 stars
The Rolling Stone Album Guide	3.5/5 stars

The Penguin Guide to Jazz selected the album as part of its suggested "Core Collection," stating "Taylor's first record remains one of the most extraordinary debuts in jazz, and for 1956 it's an incredible effort." The AllMusic review by Michael G. Nastos states "Though many did not understand his approach at the time, the passing years temper scathing criticism, and you can easily appreciate what he is accomplishing... With Jazz Advance, the revolution commenced, Taylor was setting the pace, and the improvised music world has never been the same. For challenged listeners, this CD has to be high on your must-have list." The album was identified by Chris Kelsey in his AllMusic essay "Free Jazz: A Subjective History" as one of the 20 Essential Free Jazz Albums.

== Track listing ==
All compositions by Cecil Taylor except as indicated

1. "Bemsha Swing" (Denzil Best, Thelonious Monk) – 7:29
2. "Charge 'Em Blues" – 11:07
3. "Azure" (Duke Ellington, Irving Mills) – 7:29
4. "Song" – 5:21
5. "You'd Be So Nice to Come Home To" (Cole Porter) – 9:18
6. "Rick Kick Shaw" – 6:06
7. "Sweet and Lovely" (Gus Arnheim, Jules LeMare, Harry Tobias) – 6:36

Recorded in Boston on September 14, 1956

== Personnel ==
- Cecil Taylor – piano
- Buell Neidlinger – bass
- Denis Charles – drums
- Steve Lacy – soprano saxophone (tracks 2 & 4)
