= Byrd's Word =

Studio album by Donald Byrd
- Released: 1956
- Recorded: September 29, 1955
- Studio: Van Gelder Studio, Hackensack, NJ
- Genre: Jazz
- Length: 36:52
- Label: Savoy; MG 12032
- Producer: Ozzie Cadena

Donald Byrd chronology
Byrd Jazz (1955)	Byrd's Word (1956)	Byrd's Eye View (1955)

Byrd's Word is an album by trumpeter Donald Byrd recorded in 1955 and released on the Savoy label.

== Reception ==
Professional ratings
Review scores
Source	Rating
Allmusic	3/5 stars
The Penguin Guide to Jazz	2.5/4 stars

In his review for Allmusic, Stephen Cook stated "While not on par with Byrd's much more polished efforts for Blue Note, Byrd's Word is fine for fans in the mood for some loose '50s hard bop". The Penguin Guide to Jazz regarded the recording as a routine session for Savoy: "Foster plays with intermittent enthusiasm and the rhythm section show some sparkle, but one feels that some of them were watching the clock."

== Track listing ==
1. "Winterset" (Frank Foster) - 7:14
2. "Gotcha Goin' n' Comin'" (Donald Byrd) - 9:53
3. "Long Green" (Donald Byrd) - 4:32
4. "Star Eyes" (Gene de Paul, Don Raye) - 7:49
5. "Someone to Watch Over Me" (George Gershwin, Ira Gershwin) - 7:38

== Personnel ==
- Donald Byrd - trumpet
- Frank Foster - tenor saxophone
- Hank Jones - piano
- Paul Chambers - bass
- Kenny Clarke - drums
