= Black Crow Blues =

Song by Bob Dylan

from the album Another Side of Bob Dylan
- Released: August 8, 1964
- Recorded: June 9, 1964
- Genre: Folk; blues
- Length: 3:14
- Label: Columbia Records
- Songwriter: Bob Dylan
- Producer: Tom Wilson

"Black Crow Blues" is a song written by Bob Dylan, released on his 1964 album Another Side of Bob Dylan.

Usually considered a minor work in Dylan's oeuvre, "Black Crow Blues" is the first song he released in which he plays the piano. In fact, that – with the harmonica – is the only accompaniment for his voice, as he is alone in the recording, like in most of his first four albums. This song is in the key of G major. Author Oliver Trager calls this song "A funky little piano blues that Dylan plays in his wonderfully untutored style". Black Crow Blues, argues Trager, is reminiscent of "the lilting calypsos of Harry Belafonte and piano boogie-woogies of Meade "Lux" Lewis".

Michael Gray maintains thus:

"Black Crow Blues" is itself terrific for the way that it tears into the blues structure with something so fresh, so invigoratingly off the wall, that it makes you laugh just to hear it. At the same time, and without sacrificing any of the hipness paraded by "wasted and worn out" of "My wrist was empty / But my nerves were kickin' / Tickin' like a clock", he nevertheless brings to it, particularly in the last verse, a special rural feel:

Black crows in the meadow
Across the broad highway.
It's funny, honey,
I don't feel much like a
Scarecrow today

so that in the end it is a strange sort of country blues.

Dylan has never performed "Black Crow Blues" live.
