= It's Alright, Ma (I'm Only Bleeding) =

Song by Bob Dylan

from the album Bringing It All Back Home
- Released: March 22, 1965
- Recorded: January 15, 1965
- Studio: Columbia Recording, New York City
- Genre: Folk
- Length: 7:29
- Label: Columbia
- Songwriter: Bob Dylan
- Producer: Tom Wilson

Audio sample
- file; help

"It's Alright, Ma (I'm Only Bleeding)" is a song written and performed by American singer-songwriter Bob Dylan and first released on his 1965 album Bringing It All Back Home. It was written in the summer of 1964, first performed live on October 10, 1964, and recorded on January 15, 1965. It is described by Dylan biographer Howard Sounes as a "grim masterpiece".

Among the well-known lines sung in the song are "He not busy being born is busy dying," "Money doesn't talk, it swears," "Although the masters make the rules, for the wisemen and the fools" and "But even the president of the United States sometimes must have to stand naked." The lyrics express Dylan's anger at the perceived hypocrisy, commercialism, consumerism, and war mentality in contemporary American culture. Dylan's preoccupations in the lyrics, nevertheless, extend beyond the socio-political, expressing existential concerns, touching on urgent matters of personal experience.

Dylan said that "It's Alright, Ma (I'm Only Bleeding)" is one of his songs that means the most to him, and he has played the song often in live concerts. Since its original release on Bringing It All Back Home, live versions of the song have been issued on The Bootleg Series Vol. 6: Bob Dylan Live 1964, Concert at Philharmonic Hall, Before the Flood, The Rolling Thunder Revue: The 1975 Live Recordings, and Bob Dylan at Budokan. Dylan can also be seen performing the song in the film Dont Look Back and the video of the HBO special Hard to Handle. The song has been covered by a number of other artists, including Roger McGuinn, the Byrds, Billy Preston, Hugo Race, Terence Trent D'Arby, Mick Farren, Caetano Veloso, Marilyn Scott, and The Duhks.

== Bob Dylan's version ==
Dylan wrote "It's Alright, Ma (I'm Only Bleeding)" in the summer of 1964. Although he was prepared to take his time developing the song, as he did with "Mr. Tambourine Man", he finished it in time for inclusion on the Bringing It All Back Home album, which was recorded in January 1965. Dylan first performed "It's Alright, Ma (I'm Only Bleeding)" live on October 10, 1964, at Philadelphia Town Hall. The version included on Bringing It All Back Home was recorded on January 15, 1965, the same day that the other three songs on side 2 of the album ("Mr. Tambourine Man", "Gates of Eden" and "It's All Over Now, Baby Blue") were recorded, with Tom Wilson producing.

It was long thought that the four songs that make up side 2 of Bringing It All Back Home were recorded in one long take. This is not true, but "Gates of Eden" was recorded in a single take and "It's Alright, Ma (I'm Only Bleeding)" was recorded in one take after a single false start. (the false start can be heard on both the 6-disc and 18-disc versions of The Bootleg Series Vol. 12: The Cutting Edge 1965–1966, released in 2015).

Dylan biographer Howard Sounes described "It's Alright, Ma (I'm Only Bleeding)" as a "grim masterpiece." The only accompaniment is Dylan's guitar, playing folk-blues riffs and up and down chord progressions. Author Sean Wilentz has noted that the song's chord structure is similar to that used by the Everly Brothers in their hit recording of "Wake Up Little Susie". The lyrics of "It's Alright, Ma (I'm Only Bleeding)" express Dylan's anger at what he sees as the hypocrisy, commercialism, consumerism, and war mentality inherent in contemporary American culture, but unlike those in his earlier protest songs, do not express optimism in the possibility of political solutions. In his book Bob Dylan, Performing Artist, author Paul Williams has suggested that the song addresses "the possibility that the most important (and least articulated) political issue of our times is that we are all being fed a false picture of reality, and it's coming at us from every direction." Williams goes on to say that the song successfully paints a portrait of an "alienated individual identifying the characteristics of the world around him and thus declaring his freedom from its 'rules'." As such, a major target in the song is the old, established concepts which give a false picture of reality and hinder new worldviews from being accepted.

Critic Andy Gill considered that the song "shares the same sense of societal entropy" as the previous track on the album, "Gates of Eden", but that the critique in "It's Alright, Ma (I'm Only Bleeding)" is more direct and less allusive. Author Michael Gray has commented that although the vitriol Dylan unleashes towards his targets is similar to his earlier political protest songs, "It's Alright, Ma (I'm Only Bleeding)" is a transitional song in that it does not express optimism in the possibility of political solutions. Instead, argued author John Hinchey, Dylan sings in a new prophetic voice that would become his trademark. However, with the political pessimism comes a more poetic vision than in his earlier protest songs, along with a more complex figurative language. Howard Sounes notes that the song features some of Dylan's most memorable images. The opening lines begin the song's torrent of apocalyptic images:

Darkness at the break of noon
Shadows even the silver spoon
The handmade blade, the child's balloon
Eclipses both the sun and moon
To understand you know too soon
There is no sense in trying

Gill links the opening line of the song to the title of Arthur Koestler's bleak novel Darkness at Noon, set in the Great Stalinist purge of 1938 in Soviet Russia. For Gill, Dylan is suggesting that the human spirit can be cast into darkness by the dead hand of communism as well as by American capitalism.

According to Seth Rogovoy, this opening echoes the Book of Ecclesiastes (1:17), which reads, "I observed all deeds beneath the sun, and behold all is futile." There are echoes of Ecclesiastes throughout the song. Another example is:

Although the masters make the rules
For the wise man and the fools

The author of Ecclesiastes laments (2:15–16) "The fate of the fool will befall me also; to what advantage, then, have I become wise? But I come to the conclusion that this, too, was futility, because the wise man and the fool are both forgotten. The wise man dies, just like the fool."

One of the most famous lines from the song reminds listeners that even the most powerful people will ultimately be judged:

But even the president of the United States
Sometimes must have to stand naked

These lines seemed particularly prescient when Dylan performed the song on his 1974 tour with the Band, a few months before Richard Nixon resigned as President of the United States as a result of the Watergate crisis. After the song has confronted sex, religion and politics, it ends with the lines:

And if my thought-dreams could be seen
They'd probably put my head in a guillotine
But it's alright, Ma, it's life and life only

Dylan's preoccupations in the lyrics extend beyond socio-political commentary, and touch on urgent matters of personal experience—the challenge to live and grow in the face of uncertainty.

He not busy being born is busy dying

Jimmy Carter would later refer to the line in his presidential nomination speech at the 1976 Democratic National Convention, though it addresses matters of the self which supersede politics, in the process displaying certain themes associated with existentialism. Throughout the song, the words pour out quickly, with Dylan barely taking a breath between lines, so that the intricate rhyming structure is often missed: AAAAAB CCCCCB DDDDDB in the verses and AAB in the chorus.

Dylan has cited "It's Alright, Ma (I'm Only Bleeding)" as one of his songs that means the most to him. In 1980 he said, "I don't think I could sit down now and write 'It's Alright, Ma' again. I wouldn't even know where to begin, but I can still sing it." In 1997, Dylan told The New York Times, "I've written some songs that I look at, and they just give me a sense of awe. Stuff like, 'It's Alright, Ma,' just the alliteration in that blows me away."

"It's Alright, Ma" has featured in Dylan's live concerts throughout his long career. Dylan's website reports that, as of March 2015, Dylan performed the song 772 times in concert. Concert performances of the song have been released on The Bootleg Series Vol. 6: Bob Dylan Live 1964, Concert at Philharmonic Hall (recorded on October 31, 1964), Live 1962-1966: Rare Performances From The Copyright Collections (recorded on April 30, 1965), Before the Flood (recorded on February 14, 1974), The Rolling Thunder Revue: The 1975 Live Recordings (recorded on November 4, 1975), and Bob Dylan at Budokan (recorded on February 28, 1978). In addition to playing the song live regularly in the 1960s and 1970s, Dylan has included it in his Never Ending Tour from the late 1980s up to the present. Footage of Dylan playing "It's Alright, Ma (I'm Only Bleeding)" in May 1965 is included in the film Dont Look Back, and a live performance of Dylan playing the song with Tom Petty and the Heartbreakers on February 25, 1986, is included in the video of the HBO special Hard to Handle. Dylan also sang this song at his October 16, 1992, 30th Anniversary Concert Celebration at Madison Square Garden, which was released on The 30th Anniversary Concert Celebration album. The studio recording was re-released on the 2008 compilation album Playlist: The Very Best of Bob Dylan '60s.

== Influence ==
Clinton Heylin, in his biography Bob Dylan: Behind the Shades Revisited, wrote that the recording "opened up a whole new genre of finger-pointing song, not just for Dylan but for the entire panoply of pop." Heylin adds that "It's Alright, Ma" probably contained more "memorable aphorisms" than any of Dylan's songs. One of these lines is "he not busy being born is busy dying," from the song's second verse, which was used by Jimmy Carter in his 1976 presidential nomination acceptance speech at the Democratic National Convention. During his presidential campaign in 2000, Al Gore told talk show host Oprah Winfrey that this was his favorite quotation. Writer and journalist Christopher Hitchens quoted from the song's lyrics in his last article for Vanity Fair, written shortly before his death from esophageal cancer. Hitchens posted at the top of his essay the verse of "It's Alright Ma" that ends with the words "That he who is not busy being born is busy dying".

Another line, "Money doesn't talk, it swears," which appears in The Oxford Dictionary of Quotations. In addition, the Columbia Dictionary of Quotations lists this as well as three other lines from the song: "Although the masters make the rules, for the wisemen and the fools," "But even the president of the United States sometimes must have to stand naked" and "Everything from toy guns that spark to flesh-colored Christs that glow in the dark, it's easy to see without looking too far that not much is really sacred." Other well-known lines include "Propaganda, all is phony" and "Advertising signs they con you into thinking you're the one."

In a 2005 artist's poll reported in Mojo magazine, "It's Alright, Ma (I'm Only Bleeding)" was listed as the No. 8 all-time greatest Bob Dylan song, and a similar poll of readers ranked the song at No. 21. In 2002, Uncut magazine listed it as the No. 5 all-time Dylan song. The song was featured in the final episode of The Sopranos. It has also been referenced by other songwriters. For instance, the indie-rocker Stephen Malkmus quotes "It's Alright Ma (I'm Only Bleeding)" at the end of his song "Jo-Jo's Jacket" from his debut solo album.

Hip hop group Public Enemy reference it in their 2007 Dylan tribute song "Long and Whining Road".

=== Cover versions ===
A widely known cover of "It's Alright, Ma (I'm Only Bleeding)" is that performed by Roger McGuinn for the soundtrack of the 1969 film, Easy Rider. One of the film's scriptwriters, the star, Peter Fonda, had originally intended to use Dylan's version of the song in the film but after failing to secure the appropriate licensing he asked McGuinn to record a cover of it instead. McGuinn's version of the song included on the Easy Rider soundtrack album, features McGuinn on guitar and vocals, accompanied by his bandmate from The Byrds, Gene Parsons, on harmonica.

The Byrds also recorded a version of the song during the 1970 recording sessions for their album (Untitled) but it was not included in the final track listing. The Byrds occasionally performed the song in concert during 1970 and a live recording of it, from a March 1, 1970, appearance at the Felt Forum, was included on the 2000 remaster of the (Untitled) album, which was re-titled as (Untitled)/(Unissued). This version also appears as a bonus track on the 2002 remastered version of the compilation album, The Byrds Play Dylan, and on the 2006 4-disc box set There Is a Season.

In 1971, Nannie Porres included "It's Alright, Ma (I'm Only Bleeding)" on her album I Thought About You and in 1973 Billy Preston included the song on Everybody Likes Some Kind Of Music. Artists who have covered the song since then include Hugo Race, Terence Trent D'Arby, Mick Farren, Caetano Veloso, Marilyn Scott, The Duhks, and Ground Components.

In 2014, Lee Abramson covered "It's Alright, Ma (I'm Only Bleeding)" on his band's album Blood.
