= Spanish Harlem Incident =

Song by Bob Dylan

from the album Another Side of Bob Dylan
- Released: August 8, 1964
- Recorded: June 9, 1964
- Length: 2:23
- Label: Columbia
- Songwriter: Bob Dylan
- Producer: Tom Wilson

"Spanish Harlem Incident" is a song written and performed by Bob Dylan which was released on his album, Another Side of Bob Dylan, on August 8, 1964. The song has been described as "a gorgeous vignette" by critics and been praised for its multilayered, poetic dimensions.

When Dylan himself has been questioned about the song's subject matter he has confessed that he has no idea. However, author Paul Williams describes the song as a portrait of a gypsy girl that Dylan has seen only fleetingly but who has completely captivated him. Williams goes on to say that within the context of the song, Dylan is falling in love with not only the gypsy girl but also with the whole idea of gypsies and of himself in love with one. The song takes its name from the Spanish Harlem neighborhood of New York City.

== Reception ==
Music critic Tim Riley writes that "'Spanish Harlem Incident' is a new romance that pretends to be short and sweet, but it's an example of how Dylan begins using uncommon word couplings to evoke the mysteries of intimacy...her 'rattling drums' plays off his 'restless palms'; her 'pearly eyes' and 'flashing diamond teeth' off his 'pale face.'"

Dylan has only performed the song once, on October 31, 1964, during a concert at New York's Philharmonic Hall (now the David Geffen Hall). This performance was officially released in 2004, on The Bootleg Series Vol. 6: Bob Dylan Live 1964, Concert at Philharmonic Hall.

== Covers ==
The song was covered by the Byrds on their 1965 debut album, Mr. Tambourine Man, and had first been performed by the band during their pre-fame residency at Ciro's nightclub in West Hollywood, California. The song was one of four Dylan covers to appear on their debut album. After its appearance on the Mr. Tambourine Man album, The Byrds performed the song infrequently at live concerts.

"Spanish Harlem Incident" was also covered by Dion on his 1978 Return of the Wanderer album. Chris Whitley covered the song (as well as Dylan's "4th Time Around") on Perfect Day in 2000. In 2006, a live cover of the song by Silkworm was featured on their final EP "Chokes!", featuring posthumous vocals from drummer Michael Dahlquist.
