= Motorpsycho Nitemare =

Song by Bob Dylan

from the album Another Side of Bob Dylan
- Released: August 8, 1964
- Recorded: June 9, 1964
- Studio: Columbia 7th Ave, New York City
- Genre: Talking blues
- Length: 4:33
- Label: Columbia
- Songwriter(s): Bob Dylan
- Producer(s): Tom Wilson

"Motorpsycho Nitemare", also known as "Motorpsycho Nightmare", is a song written by American singer-songwriter Bob Dylan that was released in 1964 on his fourth studio album Another Side of Bob Dylan.

It is a comical narrative song that is based in part on Alfred Hitchcock's 1960 film Psycho and also refers to Federico Fellini's 1960 film La Dolce Vita.

== Lyrical interpretation ==
The title and lyrics in Dylan's song reference Hitchcock's thriller Psycho, released in 1960. The song is a parody which also draws on traveling salesmen jokes, where the main character shows up at a farmhouse looking for a place to spend the night, only to be lured by the temptations of the farmer's daughter. Dylan weds the basic plots of the film and joke to create a humorous tale with a political point.

In the opening of "Motorpsycho Nitemare", the narrator pounds on a farmhouse door after a long day's travel, only to be greeted by a gun-bearing farmer. At first, the farmer accuses the narrator of being a traveling salesman, but he denies it, claiming instead to be a doctor, a "clean-cut kid (who's) been to college, too". Convincing the farmer, he is welcomed to stay overnight on the condition that he not touch the farmer's daughter, Rita, and "in the morning, milk the cow." In the middle of the night, however, Rita sneaks in "looking just like Tony Perkins", the actor who played Norman Bates in Psycho. She invites the narrator to take a shower, but he declines, saying he's "been through this movie before." The passage refers to the film's famous "shower scene", in which Marion Crane is stabbed to death while taking a shower in her motel room. Wanting to flee but feeling obliged to stay and milk the cow as promised, the narrator shouts out one of the most offensive things he can think of: that he likes "Fidel Castro and his beard". Enraged, the farmer chases him off with gunshots, accusing him of being an "unpatriotic rotten doctor Commie rat".

When Dylan wrote the song, at the height of the Cold War when Soviet communism was regarded as the number one threat to the USA, Castro, who set up a communist government in Cuba in the early 1960s was viewed as one of the country's principal enemies. The narrator escapes, Rita gets a job at a motel, and the farmer lies in wait for the narrator in hopes of turning him in to the FBI. At the song's conclusion, the narrator considers that "without freedom of speech, I might be in the swamp." The lines reference the film's final scene, which shows Marion's car (with her body inside) being towed from the swampland where Bates sank it. The implication of the song is that even the most outrageous political statements are protected by the First Amendment, and as Dylan's character realizes, exercising that right in this case possibly saved his life.

Historian Sean Wilentz has suggested that "Motorpsycho Nitemare" can be heard as a first draft of Dylan's song "Bob Dylan's 115th Dream", which Dylan recorded seven months later in January 1965. Wilentz argues "115th Dream" shares "an identical melody" with "Motorpsycho Nitemare" and both songs revolve around a hapless traveling salesman who is constantly "getting in and out of jams".
