= Fifth Album =

Studio album by Judy Collins
- Released: September 1965
- Genre: Folk
- Length: 42:39
- Label: Elektra
- Producers: Mark Abramson, Jac Holzman

Judy Collins chronology
The Judy Collins Concert (1964)	Fifth Album (1965)	In My Life (1966)

Professional ratings
Review scores
Source	Rating
AllMusic	3.5/5 stars
The Encyclopedia of Popular Music	3/5 stars
The Rolling Stone Album Guide	4/5 stars

Fifth Album is the fourth studio album (her 5th overall release) by American singer and songwriter Judy Collins, released by Elektra Records in 1965. It peaked at No. 69 on the Billboard Pop Albums chart.

The album featured a collection of traditional ballads and singer-songwriter material from Bob Dylan, Richard Fariña, Phil Ochs and Malvina Reynolds. A number of the songs were topical in nature, particularly Ochs' "In the Heat of the Summer" (which chronicled the Harlem riot of 1964), and Reynolds' "It Isn't Nice".

== Track listing ==
Side one

1. "Pack Up Your Sorrows" (Richard Fariña, Pauline Marden) – 3:10
2. "The Coming of the Roads" (Billy Edd Wheeler) – 3:31
3. "So Early, Early in the Spring" (Traditional) – 3:04
4. "Tomorrow is a Long Time" (Bob Dylan) – 4:04
5. "Daddy You've Been on My Mind" (Dylan) – 2:52
6. "Thirsty Boots" (Eric Andersen) – 4:57

Side two

1. "Mr. Tambourine Man" (Dylan) – 5:20
2. "Lord Gregory" (Traditional) – 3:28
3. "In the Heat of the Summer" (Phil Ochs) – 3:21
4. "Early Morning Rain" (Gordon Lightfoot) – 3:10
5. "Carry It On" (Gil Turner) – 2:44
6. "It Isn't Nice" (Malvina Reynolds, Barbara Dane) – 2:58
- "It Isn't Nice" recorded in concert at the Town Hall, New York, March 21, 1964.

== Personnel ==
- Judy Collins – guitar, vocals

Additional musicians

- Richard Fariña – dulcimer (tracks 1, 11)
- Eric Weissberg – second guitar (tracks 1, 3, 6, 10, 12), vocal (track 12)
- Bill Takas – double bass (tracks 1, 6)
- Bill Lee – double bass (tracks 4–5, 7, 10)
- Danny Kalb – second guitar (track 5)
- John Sebastian – harmonica (track 6)
- Robert Sylvester – cello (track 8)
- Jerry Dodgion – flute (track 12)
- Chuck Israels – double bass (track 12)

Technical

- Jac Holzman – production supervisor
- Mark Abramson – recording director
- Jim Frawley – cover photo
- William S. Harvey – cover design
- Richard Fariña – liner notes

== Charts ==
Chart performance for Fifth Album
Chart (1965)	Peak position
US Top LP's (Billboard)	69
US Top 100 Albums (Cash Box)	46
US Top 100 LP's (Record World)	34
