= Harumi (album) =

Studio album by Harumi
- Released: March 1968
- Genres: Psychedelic pop, soul, experimental
- Length: 79:29
- Label: Verve Forecast
- Producer: Tom Wilson

Harumi is the sole album by Japanese musician Harumi (full name Harumi Ando). The album was produced by Tom Wilson. Prior to this, Wilson had produced recordings by artists such as Bob Dylan, Simon & Garfunkel, Frank Zappa and The Mothers Of Invention, and The Velvet Underground.

== Recording and content ==
The album was recorded sometime between 1967 and 1968 in New York. Very little is known about the recording of the album aside from what is on the sleeve of the record. Key personnel such as backing musicians are absent from the album credits.

The first disc of the album is primarily songs of conventional length and style, with the longest of these lasting 4:15. The second disc is composed of two side-long tracks lasting 24:01 ("Twice Told Tales of the Pomegranate Forest") and 18:11 ("Samurai Memories"). "Twice Told Tales of the Pomegranate Forest" is a sparsely-instrumented English spoken word piece featuring Harumi and New York DJ William "Rosko" Mercer. "Samurai Memories" is much more musically frantic, featuring Japanese spoken word vocals credited to Harumi and his family.

== Release and reception ==
Professional ratings
Review scores
Source	Rating
Allmusic	4.5/5 stars

While the exact release date of the album is unknown, the March 23, 1968, issue of Billboard magazine features the record in its "New Album Releases" section. This places the album's release date between March 16, 1968, and March 23, 1968, in the United States.

Advertising efforts for the album seemed to be on par with Harumi's Verve Forecast labelmates, with a full page advertisement and a promo photo existing, as well as a promotional single of the tracks "Talk About It" and "First Impressions" that was distributed to radio stations. Furthermore, Harumi appeared on the hour-long promotional radio show "The Music Factory". On this show hosted by the album's producer, Tom Wilson, Harumi was interviewed in between select tracks from his album and other Verve Forecast artists.

Seemingly, Harumi went on a five-week tour to both promote the album as well as perform. This proposed tour would start on April 16, 1968, in Boston, Massachusetts, and end in Honolulu, Hawaii, with 13 other major American cities visited in between. It is unknown how much of this tour actually came to fruition.

Some of the album's songs eventually found themselves associated with other artists. The Chicago psychedelic soul band Rotary Connection included a performance of the song "Caravan" (stylized as "I Took A Ride (Caravan)") on their 1968 album Aladdin. Some of the songs have also found themselves utilized in sample culture as well. Part of the song "Hunters of Heaven" was quoted by Snakefinger, playing violin with The Residents on their 1972 debut EP Santa Dog. The same song was later sampled in 2002 by Jazzanova for their song "Another New Day".

Original copies of Harumi have proven to be collector's items, with a sealed copy selling at auction for a price of US$678 on August 22, 2015. This desire has led to two recent reissues, one in 2007 and one in 2018.

There is a death notice in the United States Social Security Death Index for a man named Harumi Ando, who was born on January 11, 1944, and died on January 7, 2007. If this was the same Harumi Ando, he would have been 23–24 during the recording of the album. Additionally, a 2006 article in Downtown Express, which describes tensions between the landlord and tenants of an apartment building in Manhattan, mentions a "[Harumi] Ando, a photographer who has lived in the top floor loft since 1975." It is not known whether either of these sources are referring to the musician Harumi, but given the rarity of the name (the name Harumi has feminine connotations in Japan), it is quite likely that they are the same individual.

In a 2025 article, it was confirmed that Harumi Ando (which was confirmed to be the musician's name) and his family emigrated from Tokyo to Queens while he was a teenager. From 1963 to 1965, Ando attended the School of Visual Arts in New York City, and grew acquainted with Richie Havens, Cat Stevens, and Peter Falk, before becoming a recording artist. Ando later pivoted to photo retouching and dye-transfer photographic printing after attending the Germain School of Photography in Manhattan. He lived at a rent-controlled loft close in proximity to the World Trade Center for over 30 years until his death in 2007.

== Track listing ==
All tracks are written by Harumi.

Side A
No.	Title	Length
1.	"Talk About It"	4:15
2.	"First Impressions"	3:14
3.	"Don't Know What I'm Gonna Do (Love Song)"	3:10
4.	"Hello"	4:01
5.	"Sugar In Your Tea"	3:26
6.	"Caravan"	3:07

Side B
No.	Title	Length
7.	"Hunters of Heaven"	2:59
8.	"Hurry Up Now"	3:52
9.	"What a Day For Me"	2:47
10.	"We Love"	2:22
11.	"Fire By the River"	3:34

Side C
No.	Title	Length
12.	"Twice Told Tales of the Pomegranate Forest"	24:01

Side D
No.	Title	Length
13.	"Samurai Memories"	18:11

== Personnel ==
- Harumi – Vocals, primary performer, composer, arranger, spoken word on Side C and Side D
- William "Rosko" Mercer – Spoken word on Side C
- Harumi's Parents and Sister – Spoken word on Side D
- Tom Wilson – Producer
- Larry Fallon – Arranger
- Harvey Vinson – Arranger
- H. H. Cohen – Spoken word direction (Side D)
- Gary Kellgren – Engineer, remix engineer
- Mark D. Joseph – Personal Direction
- Sherri Berri – Artwork and Photography
- Hinode Design – Jacket Design

== Release history ==
Country	Date	Label	Format	Catalog number
US	March 1968	Verve Forecast	LP (2-Disc)	FT-3030-2X (Mono Promo)
US	March 1968	Verve Forecast	LP (2-Disc)	FTS-3030-2X (Stereo)
Canada	1968	Verve Forecast	LP (2-Disc)	FTS-3030-2x (Stereo)
Germany	1968	Verve Forecast	LP (1-Disc)	FVS 9511 (Stereo)
Worldwide	May 1, 2007	Fallout Records	CD	FOCD 2042
Worldwide	January 12, 2018	Early Dawn/Early Records	CD	ED 1804
Worldwide	October 13, 2026	INFINITE FOG PRODUCTIONS	CD	EBL-026CD
