= To Ramona =

Song by Bob Dylan

from the album Another Side of Bob Dylan
- Released: August 8, 1964
- Recorded: June 9, 1964
- Studio: Studio A, Columbia Recording, New York
- Genre: Folk
- Length: 3:51
- Label: Columbia
- Songwriter: Bob Dylan
- Producer: Tom Wilson

"To Ramona" is a song by American singer-songwriter Bob Dylan, first released on his fourth studio album, Another Side of Bob Dylan (1964). The song was written by Dylan, and produced by Tom Wilson. The lyrics were started at the May Fair Hotel in London in May 1964, and finished during a week-long stay in the Greek village of Vernilya (possibly Vouliagmeni) later that month. Dylan recorded all the tracks for the album, including the song, in a single three-hour session on June 9, 1964, at Studio A, Columbia Recording Studios, New York. Its narrator advises Ramona, who is preparing to return to "the South", not to follow the advice of others. Critics have suggested several different people as inspirations for the song, including Joan Baez, Suze Rotolo, and Sara Lownds.

The song has received a positive critical response, and several assessments have ranked it as one of Dylan's 100 best. "To Ramona" was the B-side to "If You Gotta Go, Go Now" on a single issued in the Netherlands, Belgium, and Luxembourg in 1967, and has since been included on some of Dylan's compilation albums. Several live versions have been officially released, including the first live performance, at the 1964 Newport Folk Festival, and the Isle of Wight Festival 1969 version by Dylan and the Band.

== Background and recording ==
The lyrics of "To Ramona" were started by Bob Dylan at the May Fair Hotel in London in May 1964, and finished during a week-long stay in the Greek village of Vernilya later that month; at least seven other songs, including "It Ain't Me Babe" and "All I Really Want to Do", were completed during the same visit. Some of the song's lyrics were originally in Dylan's draft for the humorous "I Shall Be Free No. 10", another song completed in Vernilya.

On June 9, 1964, at Studio A, Columbia Recording Studios, New York, Dylan recorded 14 songs between 7:00 pm and 10:00 pm, 11 of which were chosen for his fourth studio album Another Side of Bob Dylan. (Note: The three that were omitted from the album were "Mr. Tambourine Man", "Mama, You Been on My Mind", and "Denise Denise".) Tom Wilson was the producer for all of the tracks. "To Ramona", the third of the songs in the session, was recorded in a single take. It was released as the sixth track and the last on side one, of Another Side of Bob Dylan on August 8, 1964. Musically, the song is similar to Rex Griffin's 1937 song "The Last Letter". The album version of "To Ramona" is Dylan's first song in a folk waltz style.

== Lyrical interpretation ==
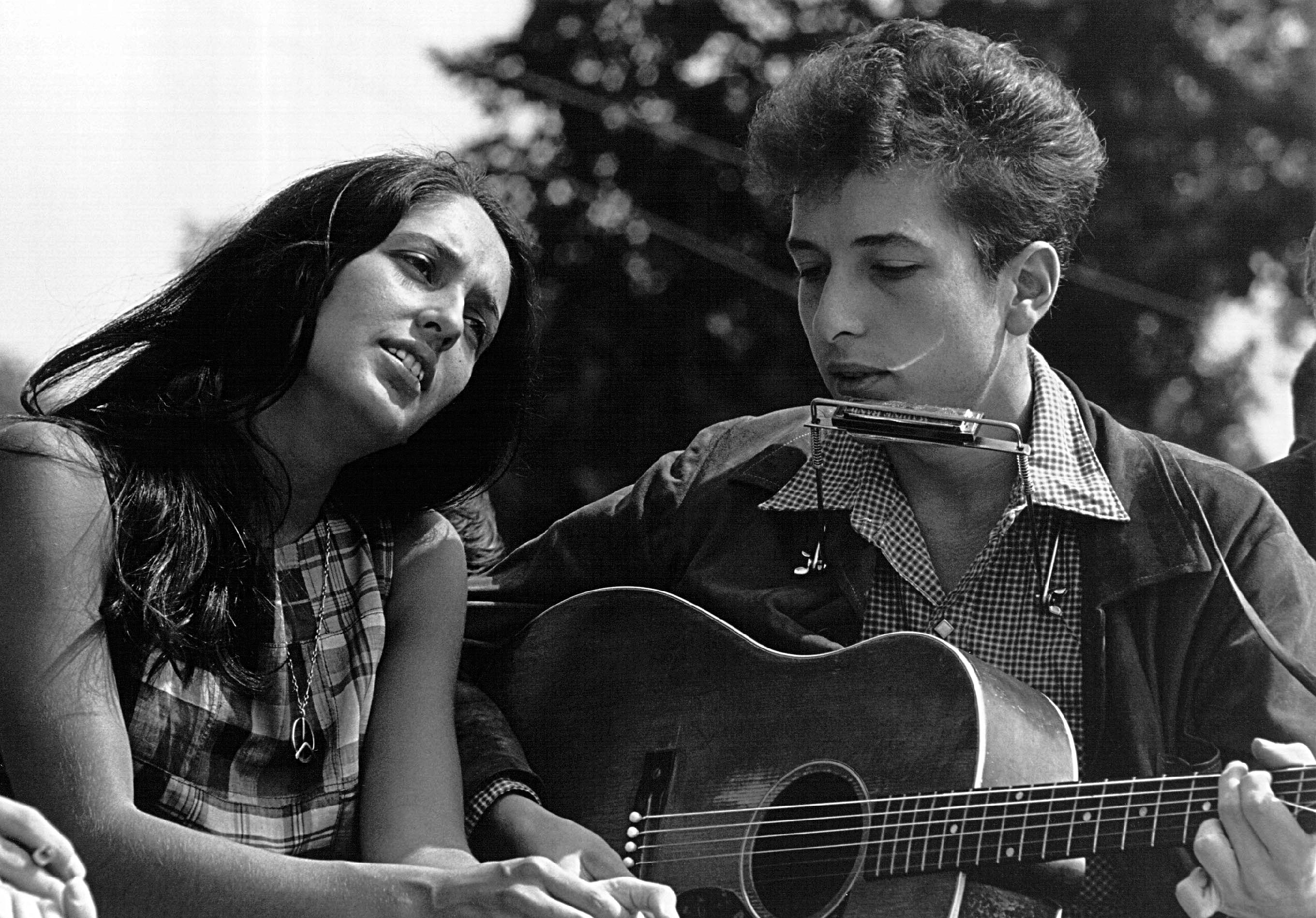
Joan Baez and Bob Dylan in 1963

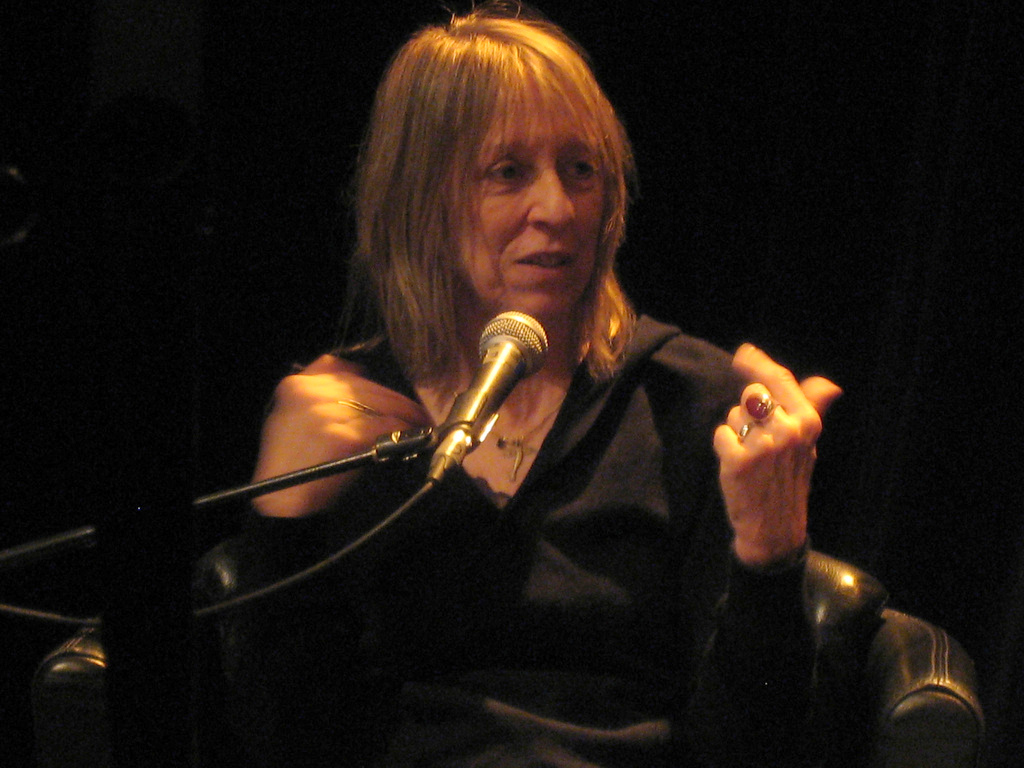
Suze Rotolo in 2009. Rotolo was pictured with Dylan on the front cover of his 1963 album The Freewheelin' Bob Dylan. The couple split up in 1964.

The song's narrator advises Ramona, who is preparing to return to "the South", not to follow the advice of others. It ends with the narrator admitting the ineffectiveness of his advice, and acknowledging that his and Ramona's position may later be reversed: "someday maybe/ Who knows, baby/ I'll come and be cryin' to you".

In the liner notes to his compilation album Biograph (1985), Dylan remarked of the song: "Well, that's pretty literal. That was just somebody I knew." In her autobiography And a Voice to Sing With (1987), singer Joan Baez wrote that Dylan sometimes called her "Ramona". Authors Philippe Margotin and Jean-Michel Guesdon, whilst acknowledging that there are substantial differences between Baez and the Ramona described in the song, argue that Dylan may indeed refer to her, citing lines that can be interpreted as relevant to her activism, for example:

But it grieves my heart, love
To see you tryin' to be a part of
A world that just don't exist
It's all just a dream, babe
A vacuum, a scheme, babe
That sucks you into feelin' like this

Commentators including Andy Gill, Oliver Trager, and Nigel Williamson have interpreted the song as inspired by Dylan's breakup with Suze Rotolo. Clinton Heylin speculates that Sara Lownds may have been the subject or target for the song. Scholar Timothy Hampton wrote that "To Ramona" "reverses the formulas of such songs as 'Don't Think Twice', with Dylan's persona now no longer the wanderer but a counselor". According to Dylan biographer Robert Shelton, the song is "A gentle lecture mixed with sexual longing that urges the woman to fight for her own identity." Trager, similarly, feels that the song contains both "advice to a wounded woman whose fate disturbs" the narrator, and "sexual longing". John Nogowski sees it as "a standard love song", and Spencer Leigh calls it a "beautiful love song". Jim Beviglia writes that the track could be "a dig at Baez" and her activism, and suggested that the narrator may not be fully sincere in their advice to Ramona, as they express a desire to kiss her "cracked country lips".

== Reception ==
Heylin describes the track as "a particularly fine portrait of a woman whose friends betray her with her words or advice". Tom Pinnock of Uncut praised the lyrics and Dylan's vocal performance, but added that Dylan's playing is somewhat clumsy in places, and "the higher strings of his acoustic are audibly out of tune". He awarded three stars out of a maximum five for the song. Nogowski gave the song a "B" rating. Trager praises the "vivid imagery" used by Dylan.

Williamson includes the song amongst Dylan's 51 best, and describes it as "one of the most tender songs Dylan has ever written". Beviglia rates the song at number 67 in his 2013 ranking of Dylan's 100 best songs. Rolling Stone placed the track 70th in their 2015 ranking of the 100 greatest Dylan songs. A 2021 article in The Guardian included it on a list of "80 Bob Dylan songs everyone should know".

Singer-songwriter Ralph McTell remarks of "To Ramona" and Dylan's "Love Minus Zero/No Limit" that they "are tangential. One thought doesn't unwrap the next. It's like each line is the first line of a new song. The lines are so great and yet he throws them away in a declamatory way." Another singer-songwriter, Loudon Wainwright III, named "To Ramona" as his favorite Dylan song.

== Live performances and later releases ==
According to his official website, Dylan has performed the song 381 times in concert since July 26, 1964; as of September 2022, the most recent performance was on June 14, 2017. The first concert performance was at the 1964 Newport Folk Festival. A 1965 live performance recorded at Sheffield City Hall was included on Live 1961–2000: Thirty-Nine Years of Great Concert Performances (2001), and a concert performance from Philharmonic Hall in 1964 was on The Bootleg Series Vol. 6: Bob Dylan Live 1964, Concert at Philharmonic Hall (2004). The Isle of Wight Festival 1969 version by Dylan and the Band was released as part of The Bootleg Series Vol. 10: Another Self Portrait (1969–1971) (2013). The 1964 Newport Folk Festival performance appeared on Live 1962–1966 – Rare Performances From The Copyright Collections in 2018. In 2021, a rehearsal version from 1980 was issued on The Bootleg Series Vol. 16: Springtime in New York 1980–1985.

Dylan is known for making significant changes from the album versions when performing songs live. In a positive review for The New York Observer of a 2017 Dylan concert, Tim Sommer remarked that "To Ramona" was one of several of his older songs "re-envisioned almost to the point of non-recognition".

After its initial release on Another Side of Bob Dylan, the track was released as the B-side to "If You Gotta Go, Go Now" in the Netherlands, Belgium, and Luxembourg in 1967. It was also included on the compilation album Biograph in 1985. A mono version was included on The Original Mono Recordings (2010).

== Credits and personnel ==
Credits adapted from the Bob Dylan All the Songs: The Story Behind Every Track book.

Musician

- Bob Dylan – vocals, rhythm guitar, harmonica

Technical personnel

- Tom Wilson – producer
- Roy Halee and Fred Catero – sound engineering
