= Smithville (album) =

Studio album by Louis Smith
- Released: 1958
- Recorded: March 30, 1958
- Studios: Van Gelder Studio; Hackensack, NJ
- Genre: Jazz
- Length: 39:09 (LP); 57:35 (CD)
- Labels: Blue Note; BLP 1594

Louis Smith chronology
Here Comes Louis Smith (1958)	Smithville (1958)	Just Friends (1978)

Smithville is the second album by American jazz trumpeter Louis Smith, recorded on March 30, 1958, and released on Blue Note—his final album for the label.

== Reception ==
Professional ratings
Review scores
Source	Rating
AllMusic	4/5 stars

The AllMusic review by Stephen Thomas Erlewine states, "Stylistically, there are no surprises here -- this is mainstream bop and hard bop, comprised of original and contemporary bop numbers, as well as standards... It's a first-rate hard bop set that deserves wider distribution than it has received."

== Track listing ==
All tracks are written by Louis Smith, except as noted.

Side 1
No.	Title	Length
1.	"Smithville"	11:04
2.	"Wetu"	9:00

Side 2
No.	Title	Writer(s)	Length
1.	"Embraceable You"	George Gershwin; Ira Gershwin	7:06
2.	"There Will Never Be Another You"	Harry Warren; Mack Gordon	5:33
3.	"Later"		6:26

CD reissue bonus tracks
No.	Title	Writer(s)	Length
6.	"Au Privave"	Charlie Parker	6:31
7.	"Bakin'" (aka "Tunesmith")		6:23
8.	"There Will Never Be Another You" (mono take)	Warren; Gordon	5:32

== Personnel ==
=== Musicians ===
- Louis Smith – trumpet
- Charlie Rouse – tenor saxophone
- Sonny Clark – piano
- Paul Chambers – bass
- Art Taylor – drums

=== Technical personnel ===
- Alfred Lion – producer
- Rudy Van Gelder – recording engineer
- Reid Miles – cover design
- Frank Wolff – photography
- Robert Levin – liner notes
