= Gates of Eden (song) =

Single by Bob Dylan

from the album Bringing It All Back Home
- A-side: "Like a Rolling Stone"
- Released: July 20, 1965
- Recorded: January 15, 1965
- Studio: Columbia Recording, New York City
- Genre: Folk
- Length: 5:40
- Label: Columbia
- Songwriter: Bob Dylan
- Producer: Tom Wilson

"Gates of Eden" is a song by Bob Dylan that appears on his fifth studio album Bringing It All Back Home, released on March 22, 1965 by Columbia Records. It was also released as a single as the B-side of "Like a Rolling Stone". Dylan plays the song solo, accompanying himself on acoustic guitar and harmonica. It is considered one of Dylan's most surreal songs. In a 2005 Mojo magazine poll of its writers and various well-known musicians, "Gates of Eden" was ranked 76th among Dylan's 100 greatest songs.

== Writing and recording ==
According to Dylan biographer Clinton Heylin, "Gates of Eden" was written in late June or July 1964. Based on the clean draft of the song, Heylin believes that Dylan did not need to struggle as much writing this song as he did with "Mr. Tambourine Man" and "Chimes of Freedom", which were written a short time earlier. In the draft, eight of the song's nine verses are complete and only two lines were revised for the final version. The final verse in the draft is incomplete, consisting of just two lines:

At dawn my lover comes t' me
an' tells me of her dreams

The song was recorded in a single take on January 15, 1965, the same day as the other songs of side 2 of Bringing It All Back Home—"Mr. Tambourine Man", "It's Alright, Ma (I'm Only Bleeding)" and "It's All Over Now, Baby Blue"—were recorded. Tom Wilson was the producer.

== Lyrics and imagery ==
The song's dream imagery is reminiscent of William Blake's images in "The Gates of Paradise" and "The Keys of the Gates". The abstract poetry inspires a nightmarish vision. Each verse provides a separate description of a decaying society. Although the song's title seems to provide hope of paradise, there is no paradise in the place this song describes. Rather, the imagery evokes corruption and decay. Dylan's ominous delivery of the last line of each verse followed by a sour harmonica note emphasizes that this Eden cannot be reached. Oliver Trager interprets "Gates of Eden" as Dylan's declaration that "blind belief in a forgiving afterlife is the ultimate lie because it creates complacency in this one." Music critic Robert Shelton has a similar interpretation, that "belief in life after death without worry or care is the ultimate myth because it takes us past the ugliness in life." Carolyn Bliss has noted about the song that "Eden is inside. Any other paradise is a sham, and pursuit of it potentially deadly to the spirit."

The lyrics describe others besides the narrator who are searching for truth in this false paradise. But the experiences that the characters endure are rendered meaningless at the end of each verse by the inevitable specter of the Gates of Eden. In the first verse, a cowboy angel riding on the clouds searches for the sun using a black wax candle. In the second verse, the cry of babies longing for the silence of Eden is shrouded by the industrialized city and its metallic objects. In the third verse, a savage soldier sticks his head in the sand like an ostrich and waits with a deaf hunter for the mythical ship to Eden. In the fourth verse, Aladdin with his magic lamp and monks riding on the Golden Calf promise paradise, and listeners only laugh at the promise once they actually get to Eden. The fifth verse describes Marxists philosophizing and waiting for kings to succeed each other, while their intended audience ignores them, knowing that there are no kings in Eden.

In verse six, a motorcycle-riding Black Madonna torments her opposite, a midget businessman, as vultures look on. Although both of them are concerned with sin, there are no sins in death or in Eden. The seventh verse tells us that Blakean "kingdoms of Experience" eventually rot, poor people battle each other over their meager possessions and the nobility just babbles on, but none of it matters in Eden. In the eighth verse, people attempt to change their fates, but it is all futile once they get to Eden. In the final verse, the narrator's lover tells him of her dreams, but the narrator realizes that his dream of death is the only truthful one, perhaps taking an example from the lover who tells rather than tries to interpret her dream:

At dawn my lover comes to me
And tells me of her dreams
With no attempts to shovel the glimpse
Into the ditch of what each one means
At times I think there are no words
But these to tell what’s true
And there are no truths outside the Gates of Eden

Cash Box described "Gates of Eden" as a "low-key blues-drenched message-song."

== Concert performances ==
A live version of "Gates of Eden", recorded at its debut performance at Philharmonic Hall on October 31, 1964, was released on The Bootleg Series Vol. 6: Bob Dylan Live 1964, Concert at Philharmonic Hall. In his introduction to the song at this performance, Dylan described the song as a "sacrilegious lullaby in D minor" and as a "love song".

A recording of Dylan's May 7, 1965 performance of "Gates of Eden" in Manchester, England is included on Live 1962-1966: Rare Performances From The Copyright Collections (2018), while a performance of the song from his May 9, 1965 concert in London was featured in the 1967 film Dont Look Back. During his Never Ending Tour, Dylan introduced an interpretation with a heavy metal edge for a brief period early in the tour and then returned the song to the setlist in 1995 with Django Reinhardt-like performances.

== Cover versions ==
Julie Felix covered the song in 1967 on Flowers, and Arlo Guthrie covered the song in 1973 on Last of the Brooklyn Cowboys. Others who have covered the song include Ralph McTell, Woody Lissauer, The Myddle Class and Bryan Ferry. Dylan sang it with Neil Young on the 1992 album San Francisco Bay Blues.
