= Full Moon and Empty Arms =

Popular song by Buddy Kaye and Ted Mossman

"Full Moon and Empty Arms" is a 1945 popular song by Buddy Kaye and Ted Mossman, based on Sergei Rachmaninoff's Piano Concerto No. 2.

The best-known recording of the song was made by Frank Sinatra in 1945 and reached No. 17 in the Billboard charts. A version by Ray Noble & His Orchestra (vocal by Snooky Lanson) also charted, reaching the No. 18 position briefly.

Other recordings include:

- Bob Eberly with Carmen Cavallero, piano (1946)
- Nelson Eddy (1960)
- Sarah Vaughan (1963)
- Bob Dylan (2015)
