= I Don't Believe You (She Acts Like We Never Have Met) =

Song by Bob Dylan

from the album Another Side of Bob Dylan
- Released: August 8, 1964
- Recorded: June 9, 1964
- Genre: Folk
- Label: Columbia
- Songwriter: Bob Dylan
- Producer: Tom Wilson

"I Don't Believe You (She Acts Like We Never Have Met)" is a song written and performed by Bob Dylan and released on his fourth studio album Another Side of Bob Dylan in 1964.

== Recording ==
The album recording was done in a single take, and Dylan chuckles to himself as he realizes that he has sung the verse beginning "Though her skirt it swayed as a guitar played" before the verse beginning, "Though the night ran swirling and whirling," contrary to the printed lyrics.

== Critical reception ==
Dylan biographer Robert Shelton describes it as being about "the intoxication of a night of love followed by the throbbing headache of his partner's emotional abandonment and detachment."

== Live performances ==
Dylan has played the song 363 times live between 1964 and 2013. One of the most notable early performances was at his Halloween, 1964 concert (released on The Bootleg Series Vol. 6: Bob Dylan Live 1964, Concert at Philharmonic Hall) where he introduced it by saying, "This is about all the people that say they've never seen you..." Other live performances of the song that have been released on Dylan's albums include: Biograph (a performance recorded in Belfast on May 6, 1966), Live 1962-1966: Rare Performances From The Copyright Collections (recorded in Cardiff, Wales on May 11, 1966), The Bootleg Series Vol. 4: Bob Dylan Live 1966, The "Royal Albert Hall" Concert (recorded in Manchester, England on May 17, 1966; also released on Live 1961-2000: Thirty-Nine Years of Great Concert Performances), The 1966 Live Recordings (boxed set; multiple recording dates, with the May 26, 1966 performance released separately on the album The Real Royal Albert Hall 1966 Concert), The Rolling Thunder Revue: The 1975 Live Recordings (recorded in Boston on November 21, 1975), The Last Waltz (recorded in San Francisco on November 25, 1976), and The Bootleg Series Vol. 13: Trouble No More 1979–1981 (Deluxe Edition) (recorded in London on June 27, 1981).
