= Byrd's Eye View =

Studio album by Donald Byrd
- Released: 1956
- Recorded: December 2, 1955; Harvard Square, Cambridge, Massachusetts
- Genre: Jazz
- Length: 55:27
- Label: Transition
- Producer: Tom Wilson

Donald Byrd chronology
Byrd's Word (1955)	Byrd's Eye View (1956)	Byrd Blows on Beacon Hill (1956)

Byrd's Eye View is an album by trumpeter Donald Byrd recorded in 1955 and originally released on Tom Wilson's Transition label. The album was later re-released as part of the compilation CD set The Transition Sessions on the Blue Note label.

== Reception ==
Professional ratings
Review scores
Source	Rating
Allmusic	4/5 stars

In his review for Allmusic, Jason Ankeny stated "For all intents and purposes, a Jazz Messengers session issued under Donald Byrd's name, Byrd's Eye View, captures the young trumpeter in full command of his estimable powers... despite the length and scope of the tracks, Byrd remains in complete control, performing with an authority and technical prowess that belie his age. An excellent hard bop date".

== Track listing ==
1. "Doug's Blues" (Doug Watkins) - 12:06
2. "El Sino" (Harneefan Mageed) - 10:02
3. "Everything Happens to Me" (Tom Adair, Matt Dennis) - 5:44
4. "Hank's Tune" (Hank Mobley) - 7:41
5. "Hank's Other Tune" (Mobley) - 7:28
6. "Crazy Rhythm" (Irving Caesar, Joseph Meyer, Roger Wolfe Kahn) - 7:35 Bonus track not released on original LP

== Personnel ==
- Donald Byrd - trumpet
- Joe Gordon - trumpet (tracks 1, 2, 4 & 6)
- Hank Mobley - tenor saxophone (tracks 1 & 3–5)
- Horace Silver - piano
- Doug Watkins - bass
- Art Blakey - drums
