= Who Killed Davey Moore? =

Song by Bob Dylan

from the album The Bootleg Series Volumes 1–3 (Rare & Unreleased) 1961–1991
- Written: 1963
- Released: March 26, 1991
- Genre: Folk
- Label: Columbia
- Songwriter: Bob Dylan

"Who Killed Davey Moore?" is a topical song written in 1963 by American folk singer/songwriter Bob Dylan. Though the song was not commercially released on Dylan's several studio albums in the 1960s, it was popular in his repertoire for live shows during that era. Dylan's performance of the song at Carnegie Hall on October 26, 1963, would later be released on The Bootleg Series Volumes 1–3 (Rare & Unreleased) 1961–1991 in 1991, and an October 1964 performance is on The Bootleg Series Vol. 6: Bob Dylan Live 1964, Concert at Philharmonic Hall, released in 2004.

== Background ==
Davey Moore was an American boxer whose career spanned 1953 to 1963. Known as "The Little Giant", Moore stood at only 5 feet 2 inches (157 cm). On March 18, 1959, Moore won the World Featherweight Title from Hogan Bassey. Moore held the title for four years and three days, defending it five times before losing it to Cuban Sugar Ramos on March 21, 1963. During the fight with Ramos in Dodger Stadium, Moore was knocked down into the ropes during the 10th round. Moore lost by technical knockout at the end of the 10th round and Ramos took the title. Moore walked back to his dressing room and conducted post-fight interviews, stating his desire to fight Ramos again and regain the title. After reporters left he complained of headaches and fell unconscious. He was taken to White Memorial Hospital where he was diagnosed with inoperable brain damage. Moore never regained consciousness and died as a result of the affliction on March 25, 1963.

== Criticism of boxing ==
Following Moore's death, the morality of boxing was debated by politicians and religious leaders alike. The song "Davey Moore" by folk singer Phil Ochs, who described himself as a "singing journalist," offered a harsh criticism of the sport and those affiliated with it. However, Dylan's song delivered a more indirect message and a message that transcended the arena of boxing to include the enveloping society. In his typically ironic fashion, when Dylan introduced "Who Killed Davey Moore" during his October 31, 1964 show, he addressed the crowd:

This a song about a boxer...
It's got nothing to do with boxing, it's just a song about a boxer really.
And, uh, it's not even having to do with a boxer, really.
It's got nothing to do with nothing.
But I fit all these words together...
that's all...
It's taken directly from the newspapers,
Nothing's been changed...
Except for the words.

== Song structure and implications ==
Dylan's song borrows the structure of the children's rhyme Cock Robin. As Dylan takes the perspective of the referee, the crowd, the manager, the gambling man, the boxing writer, and Sugar Ramos he ends each line in the first person with the refrain

"It wasn't me that made him fall.
No, you can't blame me at all."

Before the chorus, from most likely an objective voice

Who killed Davey Moore,
Why and what's the reason for?

In each verse, the defensive party gives its reasons why it is free from culpability. The sum total of their arguments implies that the blame belongs to them all—the constituent parts of the boxing industry. In the final verse, Sugar Ramos—"the man whose fists, laid him low in a cloud of mist"—is referenced as coming to the United States "from Cuba's door, where boxing ain't allowed no more." In the first released recording of the song from a performance at Carnegie Hall in 1963, a portion of the audience can be heard cheering the invocation of Cuba's then-recent policy to ban boxing, among other professional sports. In Dylan's lyrics, Ramos concludes his defense by stating Moore's death "was God's will". These words were taken from Moore's wife Geraldine's statement upon learning of her husband's death.

Pete Seeger sang the song in 1963 at the We Shall Overcome concert at Carnegie Hall (and recorded it on his 1963 album Broadside Ballads, Vol. 2), in a minor key, inserting the words in the refrain: "How come he died and what's the reason for?".
