= Louis Smith (musician) =

American jazz musician

Edward Louis Smith (May 20, 1931 – August 20, 2016) was an American jazz trumpeter from Memphis, Tennessee.

After graduating from Tennessee State University he attended graduate school at the University of Michigan. While studying at the University of Michigan, he played with visiting musicians such as Dizzy Gillespie, Miles Davis, Thad Jones and Billy Mitchell, before going on to play with Sonny Stitt, Count Basie and Al McKibbon, Cannonball Adderley, Percy Heath, Philly Joe Jones, Lou Donaldson, Donald Byrd, Kenny Dorham and Zoot Sims. Smith decided to forgo being a full-time musician to take a music teaching job at Atlanta's Booker T. Washington High School. During this time he continued playing jazz in clubs, eventually going on to record two albums for Blue Note Records.

Smith's first session as a leader, Here Comes Louis Smith (1957), originally recorded for the Boston-based Transition Records, featured Cannonball Adderley (then under contract to Mercury) playing under the pseudonym "Buckshot La Funke", Tommy Flanagan, Duke Jordan, Art Taylor and Doug Watkins. He also replaced Donald Byrd for Horace Silver's Live at the Newport 1958 set. His playing on the set was one of his best efforts and was described by one critic as "monstrous". He was a prolific composer and successful band director leaving Booker T. Washington to become director of the Jazz Ensemble at the University of Michigan and a teacher in Ann Arbor's public school system. He later recorded for the SteepleChase label.

Smith suffered a stroke in 2006, and was seen occasionally enjoying live jazz in the Detroit/Ann Arbor area, but did not return to performing.

His cousin Booker Little was also a trumpeter.

Smith died on August 20, 2016, at age 85.

== Discography ==
=== As leader ===
- 1958: Here Comes Louis Smith (Blue Note)
- 1958: Smithville (Blue Note)
- 1978: Just Friends (SteepleChase, 1978)
- 1979: Prancin' (SteepleChase)
- 1990: Ballads for Lulu (SteepleChase)
- 1994: Silvering (SteepleChase)
- 1994: Strike up the Band (SteepleChase)
- 1995: The Very Thought of You (SteepleChase)
- 1996: I Waited for You (SteepleChase)
- 1997: There Goes My Heart (SteepleChase)
- 2000: Once in a While (SteepleChase)
- 2000: Soon (SteepleChase)
- 2001: The Bopsmith (SteepleChase)
- 2004: Louisville (SteepleChase)

=== As sideman ===
With Kenny Burrell

- Swingin' (Blue Note, 1956 [rel. 1980])
- Blue Lights Volume 1 (Blue Note, 1958)
- Blue Lights Volume 2 (Blue Note, 1958)

With Horace Silver

- Live at Newport '58 (Blue Note, 1958 [2003])

With Booker Little and Young Men From Memphis

- Down Home Reunion (United Artists, 1959 Fresh Sounds 1642)
