= Timothy Hampton (historian) =

American historian

Timothy Hampton is an American historian of French studies and history, currently the Aldo Scaglione and Marie M. Burns Distinguished Professor of French and Comparative Literature at the University of California, Berkeley. He is the author of Bob Dylan's Poetics: How the Songs Work.
