= Mama, You Been on My Mind =

Song written by Bob Dylan in 1964

Song by Bob Dylan

from the album The Bootleg Series Volumes 1–3 (Rare & Unreleased) 1961–1991
- Released: March 26, 1991
- Recorded: June 9, 1964
- Studio: Columbia Studios, New York City
- Genre: Folk
- Length: 2:56
- Label: Columbia Records
- Songwriter: Bob Dylan
- Producer: Tom Wilson

"Mama, You Been on My Mind" is a song by American singer-songwriter Bob Dylan. Written in 1964 during a trip to Europe, the song dealt with his recent breakup with his girlfriend, Suze Rotolo. Dylan first recorded the song in June of that year during a session for his album Another Side of Bob Dylan. However, the song was not included on the album, and Dylan's version remained unreleased until 1991. In total, in the 1990s and 2000s four versions were put out on Dylan's Bootleg Series of releases, including two live performances with Joan Baez from 1964 and 1975.

Many artists have covered the song, including Baez, Jeff Buckley, Judy Collins, Ricky Nelson, Johnny Cash, George Harrison, Bettye LaVette, Dion and the Belmonts, Linda Ronstadt, and Rod Stewart on his 1972 album Never a Dull Moment. Dylan himself has performed the song more than 200 times.

== Writing and initial recording ==
Dylan completed a concert tour of England in mid-May and afterwards vacationed in France, Germany and Greece. During his visit to Greece he wrote several songs for his upcoming album, Another Side of Bob Dylan, including "Mama, You Been on My Mind".

After returning to the US, Dylan went into Columbia's Studio A on June 9, 1964, and in a single night recorded 14 new songs, including one take of "Mama, You Been on My Mind". However, when the album was released two months later, the song was not included. Circulated as a bootleg for many years, the outtake of "Mama, You Been on My Mind" was officially released in 1991 on The Bootleg Series Volumes 1–3 (Rare & Unreleased) 1961–1991.

== Lyrics and meaning ==
Two drafts of "Mama, You Been on My Mind" were written by Dylan on notepaper from the May Fair Hotel where he had stayed in London during his concert tour. According to biographer Clinton Heylin, the song was one of three he wrote while visiting Europe that addressed the breakup with his girlfriend Suze Rotolo in mid-March 1964.

As critic Oliver Trager describes it, the song is a "straightforward love song of separation and yearning" with a "gorgeous melody and cascading, almost incantatory lyrics". Each of the song's stanzas, except the last, ends with the title refrain, or variations of it. For example:

I don't mean trouble, please don't put me down or get upset
I am not pleadin’ or sayin’, "I can’t forget"
I do not walk the floor bowed down an' bent, but yet
Mama, you been on my mind

— Bob Dylan, "Mama, You Been on My Mind" (second stanza) Dylan 2004, p. 135

Howard Sounes, another Dylan biographer, considers the song "one of the finest love songs he ever wrote". Sounes says that while Dylan held responsibility for making a "mess" of his relationship with Rotolo, in the song "he could express himself with delicacy and maturity".

== Subsequent recordings and performances ==
Within a couple of weeks following the Columbia session, Dylan recorded "Mama, You Been on My Mind" as a demo for his publishers, Witmark Music. The demo version, which also became available as a bootleg, was finally released on The Bootleg Series Vol. 9 – The Witmark Demos: 1962–1964 in 2010.

Dylan also rehearsed a more country version of the song along with "Song to Woody" during sessions for Self Portrait on May 1, 1970, as heard on the 2021 compilation 1970.

Dylan's first public performance of the song was in a guest appearance with Joan Baez at her concert at Forest Hills tennis stadium in Queens, New York on August 8, 1964. He performed the song in another duet with Baez a couple of months later, on October 31, in his solo debut at New York City's Philharmonic Hall, this time with her as his guest. A recording of the concert was released in 2004 on The Bootleg Series Vol. 6: Bob Dylan Live 1964, Concert at Philharmonic Hall.

"Mama, You Been on My Mind" was reprised as a duet by Dylan and Baez during the Rolling Thunder Revue tour in 1975 and 1976. A live recording from the 1975 Rolling Thunder Revue tour was released in 2002 on The Bootleg Series Vol. 5: Bob Dylan Live 1975, The Rolling Thunder Revue. In 2019, that recording and four other live performances of the song from the 1975 tour were released on the box set The Rolling Thunder Revue: The 1975 Live Recordings.

Beginning in the early 1990s, Dylan added the song to his Never Ending Tour set list, performing it often as part of his nightly acoustic segment. Since 1964, Dylan has played the composition over 200 times.

== Covers ==
"Mama, You Been on My Mind" has been recorded by numerous artists since the mid-1960s, including Jeff Buckley, Johnny Cash, Dion & the Belmonts, The Dylan Project, Flatt & Scruggs, George Harrison, Steve Howe, The Kingston Trio, Mylon LeFevre, Peter Mulvey, Ricky Nelson, Rod Stewart and We Are Augustines. The song appeared on the soundtrack to the movie I'm Not There, performed by Jack Johnson. The song was further covered by Laura Veirs, and featured on the Dylan tribute album Subterranean Homesick Blues.

An alternate title, "Mama, You've Been on My Mind", has been used almost as often as the original. In addition, some female vocalists have used "Daddy" in place of "Mama", including Joan Baez, who introduced the substitution jokingly in her guest appearance at Dylan's 1964 Philharmonic Hall concert. In 1965, Baez recorded "Daddy, You Been on My Mind" for the album Farewell, Angelina, the song's first commercial release (Discogs and Second Hand Songs say the Johnny Cash version was released several months earlier, on his Orange Blossom Special LP), while that same year Judy Collins recorded "Daddy, You've Been on My Mind" for her Fifth Album. Adding yet another twist, The Kingston Trio covered the song in their live performances in Las Vegas in 1966 (released in 1969) Once Upon a Time and Linda Ronstadt covered the song for her 1969 solo debut Hand Sown...Home Grown both under the title "Baby, You've Been on My Mind".

On 9 January 1969, the Beatles, led by George Harrison, jammed the song during a recording session for their album Let It Be, as can be seen in the 2021 documentary series The Beatles: Get Back.
