= Tom Wilson (music producer) =

American record producer (1931–1978)

- Wilson (right) with Bob Dylan, recording "Like a Rolling Stone", 1965

Background information
- Born: Thomas Blanchard Wilson Jr. March 25, 1931; Waco, Texas, U.S.
- Died: September 6, 1978 (aged 47) Los Angeles, California, U.S.
- Education: Harvard University
- Genres: Rock; folk rock; jazz; experimental
- Occupation: Record producer
- Years active: 1956–1978
- Labels: Transition; Savoy; United Artists; Columbia; MGM-Verve; Audio Fidelity; Dauntless International; ABC; Dot

Thomas Blanchard Wilson Jr. (March 25, 1931 – September 6, 1978) was an American record producer. He is best known for his work in the 1960s with artists such as Bob Dylan, Frank Zappa and the Mothers of Invention, Simon & Garfunkel, the Velvet Underground, Cecil Taylor, Sun Ra, Eddie Harris, Nico, Eric Burdon and the Animals, the Blues Project, and the Clancy Brothers and Tommy Makem.

== Early life and education ==
Wilson was born in Waco, Texas on March 25, 1931, to parents Thomas and Fannie Wilson (née Brown). He attended A.J. Moore High School in Waco and was a member of New Hope Baptist Church. Wilson attended Fisk University before transferring to Harvard University, where he became involved in the Harvard New Jazz Society, radio station WHRB, and was president of the Young Republicans. He graduated cum laude from Harvard in 1954.

== Career ==
After university, Wilson borrowed $500 (equivalent to $6,009 in 2025) to set up Transition Records, having a goal in mind of setting up a record label and recording the most advanced jazz musicians of the day. The label released about a dozen albums, including Sun Ra's Jazz By Sun Ra (retitled Sun Song when reissued in 1968), which was Ra's first LP (a second LP of Transition material remained unreleased until 1968), and the album Jazz Advance by Cecil Taylor, which was Taylor's debut release. Transition also released the first sessions led by Doug Watkins, Donald Byrd, and Herb Pomeroy. The label went bankrupt in 1957 and the catalog was sold off to the Blue Note and Delmark Records. Wilson's work with Transition Records helped him obtain a job with United Artists Records in 1957. He worked as a producer for jazz labels, including Savoy Records, for whom he again recorded Sun Ra in 1961.

=== Columbia Records ===
As a staff producer at Columbia Records, Wilson was one of the "midwives" of folk-rock, producing three of Bob Dylan's key 1960s albums: The Times They Are a-Changin', Another Side of Bob Dylan, and Bringing It All Back Home, along with the 1965 single "Like a Rolling Stone". Wilson also produced the final four tracks Dylan recorded for The Freewheelin' Bob Dylan, after he replaced John Hammond as Dylan's producer in 1963.

Wilson produced Simon & Garfunkel's 1964 debut LP Wednesday Morning, 3 A.M. which included "The Sound of Silence". Seizing on local radio interest in the song in Florida and inspired by the huge success of the Byrds' folk-rock version of Dylan's "Mr Tambourine Man", Wilson took the duo's original acoustic track and, without Simon's or Garfunkel's knowledge, overdubbed electric instruments, turning the track into a No. 1 pop hit, helping to launch the folk-rock genre. Simon and Garfunkel, who had already split, reunited after the hit and went on to greater success.

After working with Wilson, both Dylan and Simon & Garfunkel worked with another Columbia staff producer, Bob Johnston, who produced several albums for both acts.

=== Verve/MGM Records ===
In 1966, Wilson signed the Mothers of Invention to Verve Records and produced on the group's debut album Freak Out!

Also in 1966, after the Animals split from producer Mickie Most, Wilson became their producer, which continued until the original band broke up in 1967. Wilson also produced the Velvet Underground, featuring Lou Reed and John Cale. Although Andy Warhol is credited as the producer of the group's debut album, The Velvet Underground & Nico (1967), Cale credits Wilson as the true producer, as Warhol was mostly absent from the sessions. Wilson was credited only for the production of the song's opening track, "Sunday Morning", which had been released as a single in 1966 prior to the album's release. Wilson also produced the Velvet Underground's second album, White Light/White Heat (1968) and was officially credited as that album's producer (the band having parted ways with Warhol prior to its recording). Wilson resigned from MGM Records (then owner of Verve) prior to the release of White Light/White Heat and did not work with the Velvet Underground thereafter.

Another of Wilson's Verve production credits was the Blues Project's first studio album Projections (1966), featuring Al Kooper (with whom Wilson had previously worked on Dylan's "Like a Rolling Stone") as vocalist and keyboard player. Wilson co-produced the Soft Machine's eponymous first album with Chas Chandler in 1968.

== Achievements ==
Wilson was an important producer of the 1960s, alongside his contemporaries (including Phil Spector, George Martin, Jimmy Miller, Brian Wilson, Quincy Jones, Tom Dowd, and Teo Macero). He has been said to have had the skill of "putting the right people together for the right projects". Grammy-winning producer Ian Brennan wrote in Tape Op Magazine, "That an African American man played a massive and pivotal role in three seminal musical forms seemingly dominated by Caucasian artists – folk rock, prog rock, and proto-punk – is one of the most tragically untold stories in popular music’s history."

Wilson made an important contribution to Dylan's rock-and-roll sound, producing his first rock recordings on Bringing It All Back Home. In the 1969 Rolling Stone Interview, Jann Wenner asked, "There's been some articles on Wilson and he says that he's the one that gave you the rock and roll sound. Is that true?" Dylan: "Did he say that? Well if he said it... [laughs] more power to him. [laughs] He did to a certain extent. That is true. He did. He had a sound in mind".

Frank Zappa spoke highly of Wilson, who produced the Mothers of Invention's first two albums Freak Out! and Absolutely Free:

Tom Wilson was a great guy. He had vision, you know? And he really stood by us ... I remember the first thing that we recorded was "Any Way the Wind Blows," and that was okay. Then we did "Who Are the Brain Police?" and I saw him through the glass and he was on the phone immediately to New York going, "I don't know!" Trying to break it to 'em easy, I guess ... Wilson was sticking his neck out. He laid his job on the line by producing the album.

== Death ==
Wilson died of a heart attack in Los Angeles in 1978, aged 47. He was buried at the Doris Miller Memorial Park in McLennan County, Texas.

== In popular media ==
Wilson appears as a minor character (portrayed by Eric Berryman) in the 2024 Bob Dylan biographical film A Complete Unknown.

== Selected discography ==
- 1956: Sun Ra: Sun Song
- 1956: Cecil Taylor: Jazz Advance
- 1956: Donald Byrd: Byrd’s Eye View
- 1958: Louis Smith: Here Comes Louis Smith
- 1959: Curtis Fuller: Sliding Easy
- 1959: Cecil Taylor: Love for Sale
- 1959: Art Farmer: Brass Shout
- 1961: Sun Ra: The Futuristic Sounds of Sun Ra
- 1963: Bob Dylan: The Freewheelin' Bob Dylan (four tracks; uncredited)
- 1964: Bob Dylan: The Times They Are a-Changin'
- 1964: Bob Dylan: Another Side of Bob Dylan
- 1964: The Clancy Brothers and Tommy Makem: The First Hurrah!
- 1964: Simon and Garfunkel: Wednesday Morning, 3 A.M.
- 1965: The Clancy Brothers and Tommy Makem: Recorded Live in Ireland
- 1965: Simon and Garfunkel: "The Sound of Silence" single (also on the 1965 album)
- 1965: Bob Dylan: Bringing It All Back Home
- 1965: Bob Dylan: "Like a Rolling Stone" single (also on the 1965 album Highway 61 Revisited, otherwise produced by Bob Johnston)
- 1966: The Mothers of Invention: Freak Out!
- 1966: The Animals: Animalisms (UK) / Animalization (US)
- 1966: Eric Burdon & the Animals: Eric Is Here
- 1966: The Blues Project: Projections
- 1967: The Mothers of Invention: Absolutely Free
- 1967: Eric Burdon & the New Animals: Winds of Change
- 1967: The Velvet Underground: The Velvet Underground & Nico (as post-production editor, remixer, and producer of the track "Sunday Morning")
- 1967: Nico: Chelsea Girl
- 1968: The Velvet Underground: White Light/White Heat
- 1968: The Mothers of Invention: We're Only In It For The Money (credited as executive producer)
- 1968: Eric Burdon & the Animals: The Twain Shall Meet
- 1968: Soft Machine: The Soft Machine (co-producer)
- 1968: Harumi: Harumi
- 1968: The Fraternity of Man: The Fraternity of Man
- 1969: The Fraternity of Man: Get It On!
- 1970: Country Joe & The Fish: CJ Fish
