= The Bootleg Series Vol. 15: Travelin' Thru, 1967–1969 =

2018 compilation album by Bob Dylan

Compilation album by Bob Dylan (featuring Johnny Cash)
- Released: November 1, 2019
- Recorded: October–November 1967; February, May 1969; May 1970
- Genre: Folk rock; country rock
- Length: 133:44
- Label: Legacy

Bob Dylan chronology
Bob Dylan – The Rolling Thunder Revue: The 1975 Live Recordings (2019)	The Bootleg Series Vol. 15: Travelin' Thru, 1967–1969 (2019)	Rough and Rowdy Ways (2020)

Bob Dylan Bootleg Series chronology
Vol. 14: More Blood, More Tracks (2018)	Vol. 15: Travelin' Thru, 1967–1969 (2019)	Vol. 16: Springtime in New York 1980–1985 (2021)

The Bootleg Series Vol. 15: Travelin' Thru, 1967–1969 is a compilation album by American singer-songwriter Bob Dylan. The 13th installment in the ongoing Bob Dylan Bootleg Series, it was released by Legacy Records on November 1, 2019. The compilation focuses on recordings Dylan made between October 1967 and May 1970 for his albums John Wesley Harding and Nashville Skyline, and appearances on The Johnny Cash Show and special Earl Scruggs: His Family and Friends.

== Track listing ==
All tracks are written by Bob Dylan, except where noted.

Disc one – John Wesley Harding and Nashville Skyline sessions
No.	Title	Version	Length
1.	"Drifter's Escape"	Take 1 (Alternate Version)	2:32
2.	"I Dreamed I Saw St. Augustine"	Take 2 (Alternate Version)	3:50
3.	"All Along the Watchtower"	Take 3 (Alternate Version)	2:31
4.	"John Wesley Harding"	Take 1 (Alternate Version)	2:47
5.	"As I Went Out One Morning"	Take 1 (Alternate Version)	4:22
6.	"I Pity the Poor Immigrant"	Take 4 (Alternate Version)	2:32
7.	"I Am a Lonesome Hobo"	Take 4 (Alternate Version)	2:56
8.	"I Threw It All Away" (Previously released on The Bootleg Series Vol. 10: Another Self Portrait)	Take 1 (Alternate Version)	2:23
9.	"To Be Alone with You"	Take 1 (Alternate Version)	2:26
10.	"Lay Lady Lay" (Previously released as a digital download with iTunes pre-orders of Together Through Life)	Take 2 (Alternate Version)	3:24
11.	"One More Night"	Take 2 (Alternate Version)	2:38
12.	"Western Road"	Take 1 (Outtake)	4:07
13.	"Peggy Day"	Take 1 (Alternate Version)	2:07
14.	"Tell Me That It Isn't True"	Take 2 (Alternate Version)	2:07
15.	"Country Pie"	Take 2 (Alternate Version)	2:07
Total length:			42:56

Disc two – The Dylan-Cash Sessions
No.	Title	Writer(s)	Version	Length
1.	"I Still Miss Someone"	Johnny Cash; Roy Cash, Jr.	Take 5	3:35
2.	"Don't Think Twice, It's All Right/Understand Your Man"	Bob Dylan/Johnny Cash	Rehearsal	2:21
3.	"One Too Many Mornings"		Take 3	4:06
4.	"Mountain Dew"	Bascom Lamar Lunsford; Scott Wiseman	Take 1	2:34
5.	"Mountain Dew"	Bascom Lamar Lunsford; Scott Wiseman	Take 2	1:50
6.	"I Still Miss Someone"	Johnny Cash; Roy Cash, Jr.	Take 2	2:24
7.	"Careless Love"	Traditional	Take 1	6:48
8.	"Matchbox"	Carl Perkins	Take 1	3:05
9.	"That's All Right, Mama"	Arthur Crudup	Take 1	2:41
10.	"Mystery Train/This Train Is Bound for Glory"	Junior Parker/Traditional	Take 1	2:12
11.	"Big River"	Johnny Cash	Take 1	2:03
12.	"Girl from the North Country"		Rehearsal	3:04
13.	"Girl from the North Country"		Take 1	2:29
14.	"I Walk the Line"	Johnny Cash	Take 2	2:40
15.	"Guess Things Happen That Way"	Jack Clement	Rehearsal	1:14
16.	"Guess Things Happen That Way"	Jack Clement	Take 3	1:45
17.	"Five Feet High and Rising"	Johnny Cash	Take 1	1:36
18.	"You Are My Sunshine"	Jimmie Davis; Charles Mitchell	Take 1	3:16
19.	"Ring of Fire"	June Carter; Merle Kilgore	Take 1	3:00
Total length:				52:52

Disc three – The Dylan-Cash Sessions, Live on The Johnny Cash Show, Self Portrait sessions, and the Home of Thomas B. Allen, Carmel, New York with Earl Scruggs
No.	Title	Writer(s)	Version	Length
1.	"Studio Chatter"			0:20
2.	"Wanted Man"		Take 1	3:11
3.	"Amen"	Jester Hairston	Rehearsal	1:39
4.	"Just a Closer Walk with Thee"	Traditional	Take 1	2:36
5.	"Jimmie Rodgers Medley No. 1" (Based on "Blue Yodel No. 1 (T for Texas)", "The Brakeman's Blues (Yodeling the Blues Away)", and "Blue Yodel No. 5 (It's Raining Here)")	Jimmie Rodgers	Take 1	2:55
6.	"Jimmie Rodgers Medley No. 2" (Based on "Waiting for a Train", "The Brakeman's Blues (Yodeling the Blues Away)" and "Blue Yodel No. 1 (T for Texas)")	Jimmie Rodgers	Take 2	3:35
7.	"I Threw It All Away" (included on 2007 DVD The Best of the Johnny Cash TV Show: 1969–1971)		Live on The Johnny Cash Show	2:21
8.	"Living the Blues"		Live on The Johnny Cash Show	2:31
9.	"Girl from the North Country" (included on 2007 DVD The Best of the Johnny Cash TV Show: 1969–1971)		Live on The Johnny Cash Show	3:19
10.	"Ring of Fire"	June Carter; Merle Kilgore	Outtake	2:27
11.	"Folsom Prison Blues"	Johnny Cash	Outtake	3:46
12.	"Earl Scruggs Interview"			0:41
13.	"East Virginia Blues" (included in 1971 documentary Earl Scruggs: His Family and Friends)	Traditional		2:34
14.	"To Be Alone with You"			2:37
15.	"Honey, Just Allow Me One More Chance"			1:52
16.	"Nashville Skyline Rag" (Previously released on the album Earl Scruggs Performing with His Family and Friends)			1:51
Total length:				38:24

A one-disc sampler was also released on the same day consisting of a select number of performances from the three-disc set.

Sampler
No.	Title	Version	Length
1.	"I Pity the Poor Immigrant"	Take 4	2:32
2.	"I Am a Lonesome Hobo"	Take 4	2:56
3.	"To Be Alone with You"	Take 1	2:26
4.	"Lay Lady Lay"	Take 2	3:24
5.	"Tell Me That It Isn't True"	Take 2	2:07
6.	"Country Pie"	Take 2	2:07
7.	"I Still Miss Someone"	Take 5	3:35
8.	"Matchbox"	Take 1	3:05
9.	"Big River"	Take 1	2:03
10.	"Girl from the North Country"	Rehearsal	3:04
11.	"Guess Things Happen That Way"	Take 3	1:45
12.	"Wanted Man"	Take 1	3:11
13.	"Ring of Fire"	Outtake	2:27
14.	"East Virginia Blues"		2:34
15.	"All Along the Watchtower"	Take 3	2:31

== Charts ==
Chart (2019)	Peak position
Australian Albums (ARIA)	21
Austrian Albums (Ö3 Austria)	8
Belgian Albums (Ultratop Flanders)	11
Belgian Albums (Ultratop Wallonia)	52
Canadian Albums (Billboard)	85
Croatian International Albums (HDU)	1
Danish Albums (Hitlisten)	32
Dutch Albums (Album Top 100)	11
Finnish Albums (Suomen virallinen lista)	49
French Albums (SNEP)	62
German Albums (Offizielle Top 100)	11
Irish Albums (IRMA)	12
Italian Albums (FIMI)	27
Portuguese Albums (AFP)	41
Scottish Albums (OCC)	3
Spanish Albums (PROMUSICAE)	6
Swedish Albums (Sverigetopplistan)	7
Swiss Albums (Schweizer Hitparade)	7
UK Albums (OCC)	6
US Billboard 200	27
