= We Are Him =

2007 album

Studio album by Angels of Light
- Released: September 11, 2007
- Studio: Trout Recording (Brooklyn, New York); Seizure's Palace (Brooklyn, New York)
- Genre: Folk rock, gothic country, alternative country, psychedelic folk, post-punk, neofolk
- Length: 55:20
- Label: Young God
- Producer: Michael Gira

Angels of Light chronology
Akron/Family & Angels of Light (2005)	We Are Him (2007)

Professional ratings
Aggregate scores
Source	Rating
Metacritic	77/100
Review scores
Source	Rating
Allmusic	4/5 stars
The A.V. Club	B
Pitchfork	8.0/10
PopMatters	7/10
Spin	7/10
Stylus	B

We Are Him is the fifth and final studio album by American experimental rock band Angels of Light. It was released on September 11, 2007, via Young God Records. The album features extensive contributions from various musicians, including the members of Akron/Family, Hungarian violinist Eszter Bálint, classical music composer Paul Cantelon, cellist Julia Kent, Bill Rieflin, and singer-songwriter Larkin Grimm.

== Critical reception ==
Upon its release, We Are Him received generally positive reviews from music critics. At Metacritic, which assigns a normalized rating out of 100 to reviews from critics, the album received an average score of 77, which indicates "generally favorable reviews", based on 13 reviews. Richie Unterberger of Allmusic wrote: "Angels of Light come up with a thoroughly respectable and diversely arranged vehicles for his vision on We Are Him, traipsing through an array of interesting moods without diluting the leader's offbeat visions," He also described the album as "much more tuneful and subdued an affair than many would expect from the former band behind Swans," while distancing it from "an average alternative rock record." Grayson Currin of Pitchfork stated: "Gira, at 53, continues to evolve, to challenge himself." Jason Heller of The A.V. Club concluded: "As much as he's painted as a dour American Nick Cave, Gira's range of tone and emotion is given open pasture here, and We Are Him is one of his strongest, most horrifically hypnotic works yet."

Rob O'Connor of Spin wrote: "Michael Gira still explores the drones and grinding rhythms that he recorded with legendary art-punk band Swans, but on this album with collective Angels of Light, the singer/songwriter focuses on whiplash juxtapositions of sound and style," while also adding that "he cuts and pastes his skewed vision of a Nick Cave-flavored Americana where mandolin and hammer dulcimer rumble with a devilish mariachi band down a dark backstreet." Mike Schiller of PopMatters stated: "Despite all of the shock and the awe, once We Are Him does settle into repeated listening, it never quite reaches the consistent, memorable heights of ...Other People." Andrew Gaerig of Stylus described the record as "an album once again stuffed with villainous, masochistic glee."

== Track listing ==
No.	Title	Length
1.	"Black River Song"	3:11
2.	"Promise of Water"	5:27
3.	"The Man We Left Behind"	5:46
4.	"My Brother's Man"	4:12
5.	"Not Here/Not Now"	5:39
6.	"Joseph's Song"	4:03
7.	"We Are Him"	4:09
8.	"Sometimes I Dream I'm Hurting You"	6:25
9.	"Sunflower's Here to Stay"	3:00
10.	"Good Bye Mary Lou"	3:04
11.	"The Visitor"	4:32
12.	"Star Chaser"	5:50
Total length:		55:20

== Personnel ==
The album personnel, as adapted from Allmusic:

Angels of Light

- Michael Gira – production, composing

Akron/Family

- Dana Janssen – drums, percussion, vocals
- Seth Olinsky – acoustic guitar, electric guitar, piano, vocals
- Miles Seaton – bass, electric guitar, piano, vocals
- Ryan Vanderhoof – vocals

Other contributors

- Eszter Bálint – violin, vocals
- Birgit Cassis Staudt – accordion
- Paul Cantelon – violin
- Patrick Fondiller – mandolin
- David Garland – flute, vocals
- Larkin Grimm – vocals
- Christoph Hahn – electric guitar, foot percussion
- Julia Kent – cello
- Steve Moses – trombone
- Phil Puleo – hammer dulcimer
- Bill Rieflin – bass, drums, electric guitar, organ, percussion, piano, synthesizer, vocals
- Siobhan Duffy Gira – vocals

Other personnel

- Bryce Goggin – engineering, mixing
- Doug Henderson – mastering
- Ben Kirkendoll – design, layout design
- Adam Sachs – assistant, engineering, performance
- Deryk Thomas – artwork
