= I Pity the Poor Immigrant =

1967 song by Bob Dylan

Song by Bob Dylan

from the album John Wesley Harding
- Released: December 27, 1967
- Recorded: November 6, 1967
- Studio: Columbia Studio A (Nashville, Tennessee)
- Venue: Nashville
- Length: 4:16
- Label: Columbia Records
- Songwriter: Bob Dylan
- Producer: Bob Johnston

"I Pity the Poor Immigrant" is a song by American singer-songwriter Bob Dylan. It was recorded on November 6, 1967, at Columbia Studio A in Nashville, Tennessee, produced by Bob Johnston. The song was released on Dylan's eighth studio album John Wesley Harding on December 27, 1967.

The song's lyrics reference the Biblical Book of Leviticus. The track has been interpreted as empathetic to the plight of immigrants, despite what appear to be some unsympathetic lyrics. The song, and in particular Dylan's delivery of the vocals, received a mixed critical reception.

== Background and recording ==
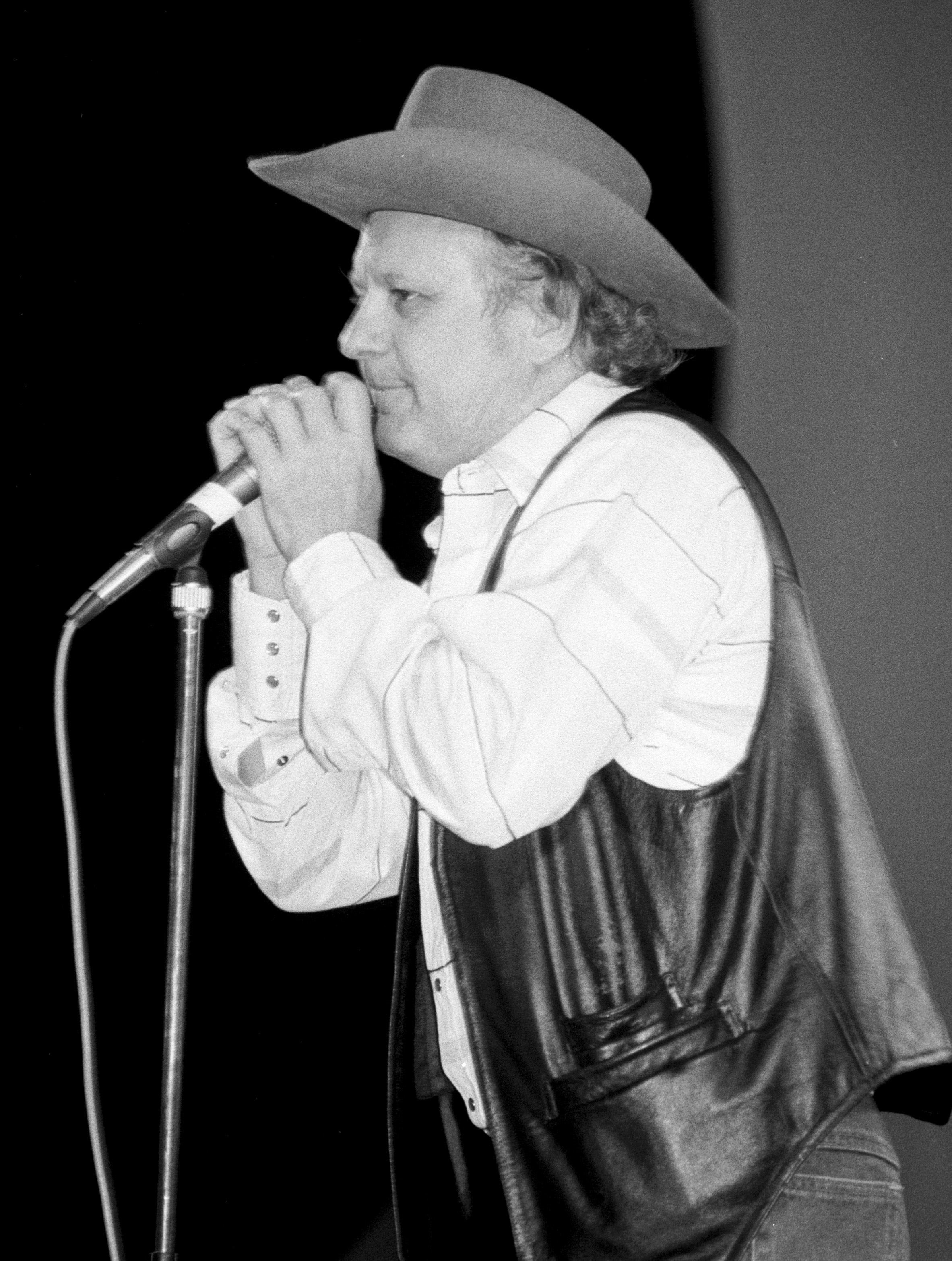
Charlie McCoy (pictured in 1990) played bass on the track.

Following a motorcycle accident in July 1966, Dylan spent the next 18 months recuperating at his home in Woodstock and writing songs. According to Dylan biographer Clinton Heylin, all the songs for John Wesley Harding, Dylan's eighth studio album, were written and recorded during a six-week period at the end of 1967. With one child born in early 1966 and another in mid-1967, Dylan had settled into family life.

He recorded ten takes of "I Pity the Poor Immigrant" on November 6, 1967, at Columbia Studio A in Nashville, Tennessee, the same studio where he had completed Blonde on Blonde the previous year. Accompanying Dylan, who played acoustic guitar and harmonica, were two Nashville veterans from the Blonde on Blonde sessions: Charlie McCoy on bass guitar and Kenneth Buttrey on drums. The producer was Bob Johnston, who produced Dylan's two previous albums, Highway 61 Revisited in 1965 and Blonde on Blonde in 1966, and the sound engineer was Charlie Bragg. The last of the ten takes was released as the third track on side two of John Wesley Harding on December 27, 1967.

== Composition and lyrical interpretation ==
Dylan visited London from December 1962 to January 1963, where he heard folk singers including Martin Carthy and learned tunes, including "Come All Ye Tramps And Hawkers" and "Paddy West" which he adapted in composing "I Pity the Poor Immigrant". The Sunday Herald's Ron McKay referred to Dylan's song as "a straight pinch, with Dylan variations, of course, from 'Come All Ye Tramps and Hawkers', a traditional song performed by Jimmy MacBeath, a Scottish traveller from Portsoy, who probably pinched it from someone else." John Boland of the Irish Independent noted that the same tune was also used in "The Homes of Donegal", which pre-dated Dylan's song.

Asked by interviewer John Cohen in 1968 whether there was a "germ that started" the song, Dylan replied "Yes, the first line." Cohen followed up by asking what the trigger might have been, to which Dylan responded "To tell the truth, I have no idea how it comes into my mind." Critic Andy Gill calls the song "confusing", finding it unclear whether it is a literal immigrant, or a person who lives like an immigrant, with Dylan's "gentle and piteous delivery bely[ing] his tough attitude." Across three verses, Dylan outlines what Gill describes as the subject's "propensity to strive for evil ... lying, cheating, greed, self-loathing, uncharitableness and ruthlessness", possibly satirically. The song ends with "I pity the poor immigrant / When his gladness comes to pass".

The lyrics feature phrases such as "strength spent in vain" "heaven [as] iron" and "eats but is not satisfied" which closely match the Book of Leviticus, Chapter 26, verses 20, 19, and 26. Critic Oliver Trager believes that "essence of [the Biblical] references is that God punishes those who do not obey the Ten Commandments by turning them into immigrants and casting them into a threatening environment", and that the lyrics "finds Dylan playing with the conflicting instincts driving his song's title character". Journalist Paul Williams wrote that Dylan's delivery and music show him as an "empathetic (human) observer" rather than the voice of the Old Testament version of God, but Harvey Kubernik concluded in Goldmine that "the 'speaker' of the song likely is Christ"

Classics scholar Richard F. Thomas interprets "I Pity the Poor Immigrant" as a "plaintive song of empathy, for the poor immigrant who just doesn't fit, and whose preoccupations – that man 'who falls in love with wealth itself and turns his back on me' —keep him from joining the world of the singer." Time called it a melancholy portrait of a misanthropic, malcontented wanderer", citing the lyric "who passionately hates his life and likewise fears his death." In The Guardian, Neil Spencer felt that it has an "enigmatic mix of empathy and judgment" Gordon Mills wrote in Rolling Stone that Dylan

"suggests the immense sympathy he has for those who have dared to cut the rope and be free from the life of being one, 'who lies with every breath, who passionately hates himself, and likewise fears his death.' ... The immigrant, having seen through the enormous paradox of wealth and poverty on this earth, seeks another way. The song ends with open tenderness for those who have made the journey."

Scholar of English David Punter wrote that it is unclear who the audience that the narrator of the song addresses are, but that the lyrics seem to be "less about a concern for the immigrant himself than about the plight into which his situation places all of us". He suggested that the opening verse, which says that the "poor immigrant ... uses all his power to do evil "is indicative of "depthless irony". According to Punter:

"we are not, surely, supposed to mistake the immigrant for a terrorist, but instead to sense the interior struggle of resentment, and hence a questioning of what this 'evil' might actually be: an evil emanating from the immigrant, or more probably the impossibility of escaping from prejudice, of always being 'pre-judged' and feeling the distorted need to live up to these negative expectations."

Punter considers that the verse which contains "fills his mouth with laughing / And who builds his town with blood" relates to the trope of the immigrant rather than a more literal interpretation, and that it serves to uncover "a whole series of associations which remind us of a complex history of violence, of defamiliarization".

== Critical reception ==
Record Mirror reviewer Norman Jopling described the track as "draggy with tremendous atmosphere and an unusually different vocal sound", saying "you could almost fall asleep to this one." Pete Johnson of the Los Angeles Times called the track "as maudlin and gummy as it sounds" and added that "Dylan's voice may be parodying Dylan's voice deliberately." David Yaffe described the vocal as "morose, almost a parody of self-righteous liberal guilt." Greil Marcus wrote that Dylan sounded ill, "his voice curled up in his throat, will and desire collapsed under leaden vowels." Trager wrote that Dylan's singing was "in top form."

The song was awarded a maximum rating of 5 stars by Allan Jones in Uncut's Bob Dylan supplement in 2015. It was in 20th place on Thomas's 2017 list of the best Bob Dylan songs in Maxim. Matthew Greenwald of AllMusic thought that "the song works on several levels and portrays an illustration of people who can't help but use others."

== Live performances ==
According to his official website, Dylan has played the song in concert 17 times. The live debut was on August 31, 1969, at the Isle of Wight Festival, following which he did not perform it live again until the Rolling Thunder Revue in 1976. One of the 1976 performances, with Joan Baez, was included in the Hard Rain television special. Williams regarded "I Pity the Poor Immigrant" as the highlight of the TV special, highlighting Howie Wyeth's piano playing, Dylan's "masterful vocal performance", and Baez's "good-humoured warrior harmonies." Dylan's most recent concert performance of the song was on May 25, 1976, in Salt Lake City. Heylin felt that the song was "redeemed by the glorious honky-tonk arrangement" on the Rolling Thunder tour.

An out-take from the original sessions was included on The Bootleg Series Vol. 15: Travelin' Thru, 1967–1969 (2019). Jamie Atkins of Record Collector magazine wrote that this version "gallops along – compared to the original it's practically a head-shaking beat group rave-up." The Bootleg Series Vol. 10: Another Self Portrait (1969–1971) (2013), includes "I Pity the Poor Immigrant" from the Isle of Wight concert, August 31, 1969.

== Credits ==
Personnel for the November 6, 1967, recordings at Columbia's Nashville studios:

Musicians

- Bob Dylan – vocals, rhythm guitar, harmonica
- Charlie McCoy – bass
- Kenneth Buttrey – drums

Technical

- Bob Johnston – production
- Charlie Bragg – engineering

== Official releases ==
- John Wesley Harding (1967)
- The Original Mono Recordings (2010)
- The Bootleg Series Vol. 10: Another Self Portrait (1969–1971) (2013)
- The Bootleg Series Vol. 15: Travelin' Thru, 1967–1969 (2019)

A duet with Joan Baez from the 1976 Hard Rain TV Special was released on Baez's CD and DVD How Sweet The Sound in 2009.

== Cover versions ==
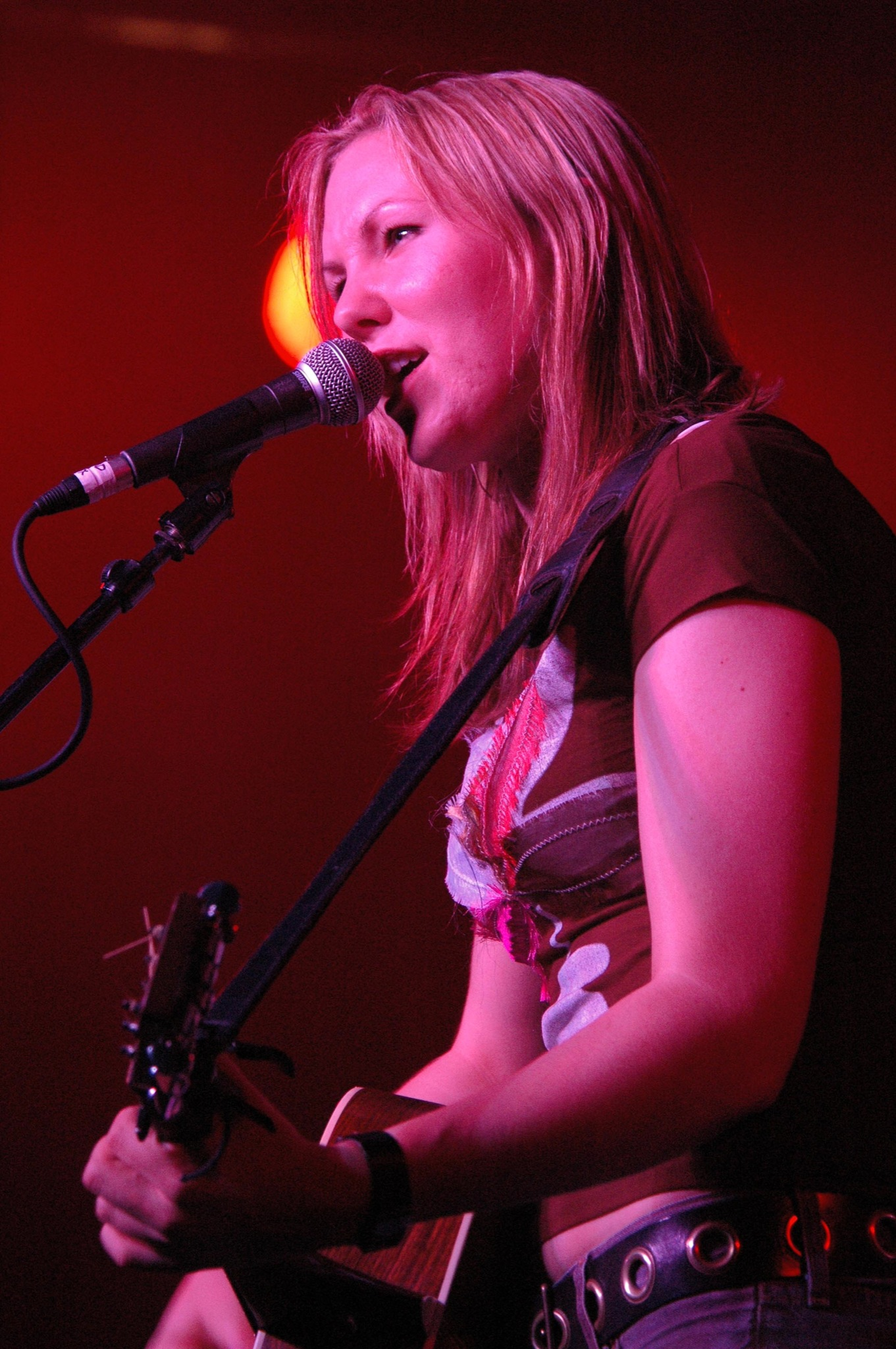
Thea Gilmore (pictured in 2004) covered the whole John Wesley Harding album in 2011.

Covers of the song include versions by Judy Collins on Who Knows Where The Time Goes (1967), Joan Baez on Any Day Now (1968), and Richie Havens on Richard P. Havens, 1983 (1969). Marion Williams released the song on a single in 1969. Sidney Nelson of Nottingham Evening Post praised Collins's' version, describing it as better than Dylan's. Baez's version was described as "mediocre" by Robb Baker of the Chicago Tribune, and as "shrill and strained" by Ralph J. Gleason in The San Francisco Examiner.

Planxty's cover on their album Words & Music was described by Steven X. Rea of the Philadelphia Inquirer as "lethargic". Marty Ehrlich's 2001 version on his album Song was called "a slow bluesy meander that grows gently funkier" by John Fordham in The Guardian. The band Angels of Light covered the song on their album Akron / Family & Angels of Light, with Akron/Family playing backing instruments. Thea Gilmore covered the whole John Wesley Harding album in 2011. Patrick Humphries, writing for BBC Music, described her version of "I Pity the Poor Immigrant" as "a poignant testament to the untold millions who passed through Ellis Island".
