= Sparrow Trout Heart Sprout =

Studio album by Best of Seth
- Released: 2007
- Recorded: 2004–2005
- Genre: Psychedelic folk, experimental rock
- Length: 162:51
- Label: Achord Recordings
- Producer: Seth Olinsky, Doug Henderson

Professional ratings
Review scores
| Source | Rating |
|---|---|
| Pitchfork | (6.1/10) |
| Stylus Magazine | (C) |
| Tiny Mix Tapes | 3.5/5 stars |

Sparrow Trout Heart Sprout is an album by Akron/Family member Seth Olinsky, released in 2007 under the name Best of Seth. Material from this album originally formed the basis of a CD-R, which was distributed by Akron/Family in the months prior to the release of their self-titled first album on Young God Records. The songs were later remastered by Doug Henderson at the Brooklyn-based studio Micro Moose, and sold in an elaborately packaged edition of 500 copies.

== Track listing ==
Disc 1
Trout

1. "Dirt Road Cloud of Light" – 4:25
2. "Rainbow Trout" – 4:37
3. "No Dada for You Baba" – 4:14
4. "Song for Chris and Ed" - 2:42
5. "Always Gone" – 3:58
6. "It's So Hard" – 3:20
7. "Sparks" – 3:32
8. "Meek Warrior" – 2:01
9. "Ground" - 6:02
10. "Beard Rock" - 1:35
11. "Responsible for the Weather" - 4:29
12. "The Only Home" - 1:36
13. "Noah" - 3:28
14. "Dream Girl" - 2:06
15. "Top of the Mountain" - 5:52
16. "The Littlest Horse" - 1:37

Disc 2
Sun

1. "As It Was in the Beginning, Is Now" - 3:14
2. "Sun Comes Up" - 5:27
3. "Space/Love --> Space is Love" - 5:52
4. "Lord Open My Heart" - 3:04
5. "Sunspots" - 3:50
6. "No Space in This Realm" - 5:00
7. "Come to Terms (With What's Going On)" - 5:21
8. "Blessing Force" - 2:15
9. "Where the Grass Tells Me" - 4:25
10. "If On the Path" - 5:23
11. "What Point Was Come" - 3:30
12. "Space/Love" - 2:31
13. "I Once Was As It Was" - 2:17

Disc 3
Sparrow

1. "World of Difference" - 2:37
2. "Death Sparrow Blues" - 6:31
3. "I've Had Enough" - 3:28
4. "Sofie" - 5:27
5. "Finland, Masked in Lupins" - 5:59
6. "Saddest Turtle" - 0:42
7. "Don't Seem Right" - 3:29
8. "Ali, Ali" - 2:25
9. "Rinpoche Said" - 3:27
10. "Ghost of Katie" - 6:15
11. "And Everything" - 3:12
12. "Sun Goes Down" - 2:17
13. "On the Battlefield/Authentic Man" - 9:39
