= Larry Mullins (musician) =

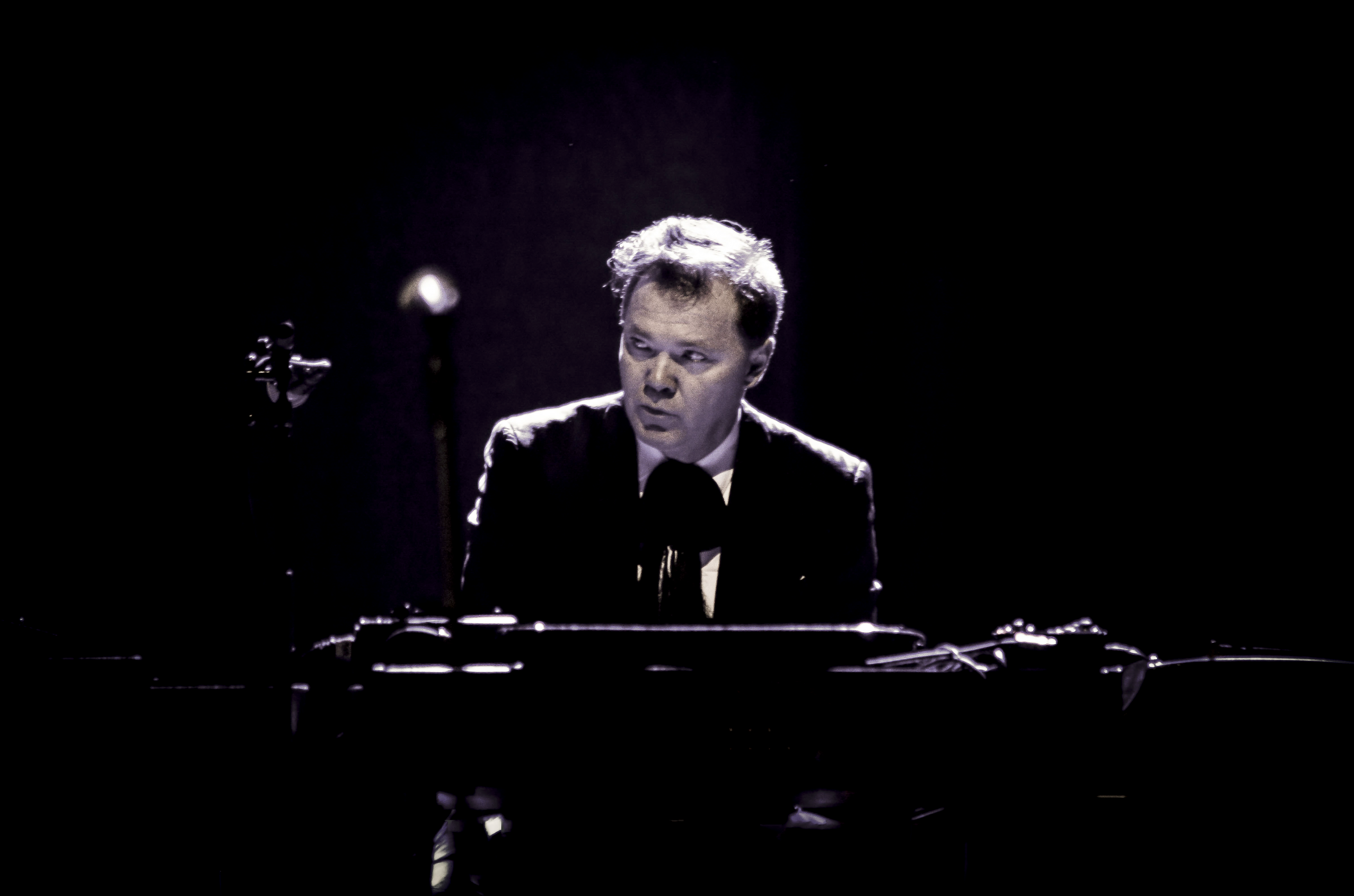
- Larry Mullins playing keyboards with Nick Cave and the Bad Seeds in 2017.

Background information
- Born: Lawrence Edward Mullins; 13 December 1966 (age 59); Knoxville, Tennessee, USA
- Genre: Alternative rock
- Occupations: Musician; record producer; composer; arranger
- Instruments: Drums; percussion; keyboards; vocals
- Years active: 1984–present
- Website: tobydammit.com

Lawrence Edward Mullins, also known as Toby Dammit, (born 13 December 1966 in Knoxville, Tennessee) is an American musician, record producer, and composer. A multi-instrumentalist (primarily drums, percussion, and keyboards), Mullins is best known as a member of the bands Nick Cave and the Bad Seeds and Swans, as well as a former member of The Stooges and other incarnations of Iggy Pop's bands. He has also worked extensively in music for films and television, and had a performance role in the German cable series Babylon Berlin.

== Music career ==
Mullins played drums in Iggy Pop's band from 1990 to 1999, recording three albums and additional works created specifically for films. In 2011, he joined Iggy and The Stooges in England, and remained their live drummer until their final performance in 2013.

Mullins joined Swans in 1995 and continued working with Swans frontman Michael Gira in Angels of Light into 2003. He rejoined Swans in 2019 for the recording of their album Leaving Meaning, and remains a member as of 2026.

Mullins's percussion work appeared throughout the score for Johnny Depp's 1997 film The Brave, where he is credited as "Lawrence Mullins." His original composition for the theme of director Tom Tykwer's German cable series Babylon Berlin, in which he had a screen role as big band drummer Willy Schuricke, was published as sheet music in 2020. In 2021, Mullins performed on drums for Anna Calvi's score for the 2022 Peaky Blinders cable series.

In 2015, Mullins began performing live with Nick Cave and the Bad Seeds as keyboardist, and continued performing with them during their world tour for the album Skeleton Tree. The tour for the album was documented in the film Distant Sky: Live in Copenhagen. In October, 2018, he switched from playing keyboards to playing drums for the band. Mullins drummed for the Ghosteen European tour in 2022 and Wild God tour in 2024-26, and joined Nick Cave and Warren Ellis for their Carnage tour of Australia in 2022.

== Works (selected) ==
Solo

- Top Dollar (2001)
- Camissonia (2024)

Film scores

- Apple Jack (2006)

Collaborations

- Karny Sutra - with Luther Hawkins (2003)
- Morphosa Harmonia - with Thomas Wydler (2004)

As producer

- Bee and Flower - Last Sight Of Land (2007)
- Draculina - Sinematheque 26 (2026)
- James Eleganz - The Only One (2019)
- James Eleganz - Hotel Augusta (2022)
- Mell (French singer) - Western Spaghetti (2010)
- The Lightnin 3 - Morning, Noon & Night (2012)
- Mike Watt - "1969" (Parts One + Two) (2019)
- Mike Watt - "1970" (Parts One + Two) (2020)
- Mike Watt - Fun House (Parts One + Two) (2022)
- Mike Watt - TV Eye (Parts One + Two) (2023)
- Mike Watt - We Will Fall (Parts One + Two) (2025)

As a featured musician

- Angels of Light - New Mother (1999)
- Angels of Light - How I Loved You (2001)
- Angels of Light - We Were Alive! (2002)
- Angels of Light - Everything Is Good Here/Please Come Home (2003)
- Arno - Jus de box (2007)
- Meret Becker - Deins & Done (2014)
- Miguel Bosé - Amo (Miguel Bosé album) (2014)
- Bertrand Burgalat - Portrait Robot (2005)
- Anna Calvi - Tommy (EP) (2022)
- Anna Calvi - Peaky Blinders Season 5 & 6 (original score) (2024)
- Cano Caoli (Japanese singer) - Voyage: London･Paris･Stockholm (1998)
- Nick Cave & Warren Ellis - Australian Carnage (Live At The Sydney Opera House) (2023)
- Nick Cave And The Bad Seeds - Live God (2025)
- Stephan Eicher - Taxi Europa (2003)
- Stephan Eicher - Tour Taxi Europa (2004)
- Stephan Eicher - Eldorado (2007)
- Stephan Eicher - Eldorado Trio Live (2009)
- Stephan Eicher - L’Envolée (2012)
- Mark Eitzel - Music for Courage and Confidence (2002)
- Ely Guerra - Lotofire (2002)
- Mick Harvey - Delirium Tremens (2016)
- Mick Harvey - Intoxicated Women (2017)
- Alina Kalancea - Letters Never Sent (2023)
- Jesse Malin - The Fine Art of Self Destruction (2002)
- Marie Modiano - I'm Not A Rose (2006)
- Marie Modiano - Pauvre chanson (2018)
- Moka Efti Orchestra - Erstausgabe (2020)
- Masatoshi Nagase - Vending Machine (1996)
- Paul Personne - Patchwork Electrique (2000)
- Peter Von Poehl - Going To Where The Tea Trees Are (2006)
- Peter Von Poehl - Memories From Saint-Forget (2021)
- Peter Von Poehl & Marie Modiano - Songs From The Other Side (2021)
- Peter Von Poehl & Marie Modiano - Capri (2024)
- Peter Von Poehl & Marie Modiano - Live At 7L (2026)
- Iggy Pop - American Caesar (1993)
- Iggy Pop - Naughty Little Doggie (1996)
- Iggy Pop - Avenue B (1999)
- Iggy and The Stooges - Ready to Die (2013)
- The Ringling Sisters - 60 Watt Reality (1990)
- Raphael - Pacific 231 (2010)
- Raphael - Live Vu Par Jacques Audiard (2011)
- Raphael - Anticyclone (2017)
- Shakespears Sister - Ride Again (2019)
- Starlight Mints - The Dream That Stuff Was Made Of (2000)
- Swans - Die Tür ist zu (1996)
- Swans - Soundtracks For The Blind (1996)
- Swans - Swans Are Dead (1997)
- Swans - Leaving Meaning (2019)
- Swans - The Beggar (2023)
- Swans - Live Rope (2024)
- Swans - Birthing (2025)
- Swans - Newly Sentient Being (2026)
- Rufus Wainwright - Release The Stars (2007)
- Chuck E. Weiss - Extremely Cool (2007)
- Zaz - Zaz (2010)

Soundtrack contributions

- Freddy's Dead: The Final Nightmare (1991)
- Iggy Pop: Kiss My Blood: Live at The Olympia, Paris (1991)
- The Crow: City of Angels (1996)
- Les Zinzins de l'espace (1997)
- The Brave (1997)
- Dead Dogs Lie (2001)
- The Residents: Icky Flix (2001)
- Monsieur N. (2002)
- Coffee and Cigarettes (2003)
- School Of Rock (2003)
- Eierdiebe (2003)
- The Residents: Demons Dance Alone (2003)
- The Residents: The Residents Play Wormwood (2005)
- Die Unerzogenen (2007)
- Capitalism: A Love Story (2009)
- Im Alter von Ellen (2010)
- End of Watch (2012)
- Premium Rush (2012)
- Dead Man Down (2013)
- The Parisian Bitch, Princess of Hearts (2015)
- The Invaders (2016)
- Babylon Berlin (2018)
- Nick Cave and the Bad Seeds: Distant Sky: Live in Copenhagen (2018)
- Piercing (film) (2018)
- Lotte am Bauhaus (2019)
- Swans: Where Does a Body End? (2020)
- Peaky Blinders: (Season 6, 2022)
- Sverige och kriget (2025)
- The New Force (2025)

Publications

- 1001 Nights: Willy Schuricke's Legendary Drum Solo as Performed in "Babylon Berlin" (sheet music, 2020)
