= Gimme =

Gimme may refer to:

== Music ==
- "Gimme" (Alice Cooper song), 2000
- "Gimme" (Banks song), 2019
- "Gimme" (Boom Crash Opera song),1994
- "Gimme" (One song), by the Cypriot boy band One, 2002
- "Gimme" (Sam Smith, Koffee, and Jessie Reyez song), 2023

== Other uses ==
- Gimme (golf), a shot agreed to be counted automatically without being actually played
- Gimme (film), a 1923 American silent film directed by Rupert Hughes
- Gimme! Coffee, a chain of espresso bars in the state of New York, United States

== See also ==
- Gimme Gimme (disambiguation)
- Gimme Gimme Gimme (disambiguation)
