= Akron/Family II: The Cosmic Birth and Journey of Shinju TNT =

Akron/Family S/T II: The Cosmic Birth and Journey of Shinju TNT

Studio album by Akron/Family
- Released: February 8, 2011
- Recorded: June 2010
- Genres: Folk, psychedelic rock, experimental rock
- Length: 47:53
- Label: Dead Oceans
- Producer: Akron/Family

Akron/Family chronology
Set 'Em Wild, Set 'Em Free (2009)	Akron/Family S/T II: The Cosmic Birth and Journey of Shinju TNT (2011)	Sub Verses (2013)

Professional ratings
Aggregate scores
Source	Rating
Metacritic	79/100
Review scores
Source	Rating
AllMusic	4/5 stars
Crackle Feedback	(8/10)
Filter Magazine	(78%)
Spin	8/10 stars
Pitchfork	(7.9/10)
Drowned In Sound	(8/10)
InYourSpeakers	(72/100)

Akron/Family II: The Cosmic Birth and Journey of Shinju TNT (sometimes spelled as Akron/Family S/T II: The Cosmic Birth and Journey of Shinju TNT) is the fifth studio album by experimental rock band Akron/Family, released on February 8, 2011, on Dead Oceans Records. This is the group's second album following the departure of founding member Ryan Vanderhoof as well as their second for Dead Oceans.

== Track listing ==
All tracks are written by Akron/Family.

No.	Title	Length
1.	"Silly Bears"	5:45
2.	"Island"	4:52
3.	"A AAA O A WAY"	2:07
4.	"So It Goes"	2:36
5.	"Another Sky"	5:12
6.	"Light Emerges"	5:41
7.	"Cast a Net"	3:58
8.	"Tatsuya Neon Purple Walkby"	0:43
9.	"Fuji I (Global Dub)"	2:23
10.	"Say What You Want To"	3:26
11.	"Fuji II (Single Pane)"	4:21
12.	"Canopy"	3:29
13.	"Creator"	3:18
14.	"Healing Vapor Prismatic" (Vinyl-only Bonus Track)	16:26

== Personnel ==
- Miles Seaton
- Seth Olinsky
- Dana Janssen

== Other Credits ==
- Ali Beletic – vocals
- Paul Gold – mastering
- Chris Koltay – engineer, mixing
- Tatsuya Nakatani – gong, percussion
- Martin Rietze – photography
- Ed Sortman – trumpet
- Ryan Vanderhoof – slide guitar
