= We Were Alive! =

2002 album

Live album by Angels of Light
- Released: 2002
- Length: 72:51
- Label: Young God
- Producer: Michael Gira

Angels of Light chronology
How I Loved You (2001)	We Were Alive! (2002)	Everything Is Good Here/Please Come Home (2003)

We Were Alive! is a live album by folk rock band Angels of Light. It was released in 2002, and contains two songs previously recorded by Swans. It was limited to 750 copies on release.

The earnings from the record sales were used for the production of Angels of Light's next studio release, Everything Is Good Here/Please Come Home. The same funding strategy was subsequently used by Angels of Light frontman Michael Gira's other band Swans, starting in 2012 when the band released their live album, We Rose from Your Bed with the Sun in Our Head to fund their then-upcoming album The Seer.

== Critical reception ==
Professional ratings
Review scores
Source	Rating
AllMusic	3/5 stars

Ned Raggett of AllMusic wrote: "The sound quality sometimes results in a distanced overall mix (it combined desk recordings with a live room mic), which often can bury Mullins' quieter drum work to the point of sensing it rather than hearing it. It's unfortunate but not crippling, and in ways actually gives We Were Alive! a weird texture that's worth a listen." Peter Marks of Release Magazine stated: "Delicate interludes in the midst of absolute chaotic cruelty which would make Glenn Branca blush."

== Track listing ==
No.	Title	Length
1.	"Evangeline"	8:06
2.	"What Will Come"	6:55
3.	"Nations"	6:18
4.	"My Suicide"	5:43
5.	"All Souls' Rising"	9:36
6.	"NY Girls"	9:28
7.	"What You Were"	8:20
8.	"On the Mountain"	7:20
9.	"God Damn the Sun" (from Swans album The Burning World)	5:04
10.	"Failure" (from Swans album White Light from the Mouth of Infinity)	6:01
Total length:		72:51

== Personnel ==
Angels of Light

- Michael Gira – vocals, guitar, production

Contributors

- Dana Schechter – bass, piano, vocals
- Larry Mullins – Farfisa, Marimba Lumina, drums
- Thor Harris – vibraphone, hammer dulcimer, autoharp, piano, percussion
