= Set 'Em Wild, Set 'Em Free =

Studio album by Akron/Family
- Released: May 5, 2009
- Genre: Experimental rock, indie folk
- Label: Dead Oceans

Akron/Family chronology
Love Is Simple (2007)	Set 'Em Wild, Set 'Em Free (2009)	Akron/Family II: The Cosmic Birth and Journey of Shinju TNT (2011)

Professional ratings
Aggregate scores
Source	Rating
Metacritic	78/100
Review scores
Source	Rating
AllMusic	4/5 stars
Blender	3.5/5 stars
Pitchfork	(6.4/10)
PopMatters	(9/10)
Rock Sound	8/10 stars
Tiny Mix Tapes	2.5/5 stars

Set 'Em Wild, Set 'Em Free is the fourth album by Akron/Family. It was released on May 5, 2009, by Dead Oceans Records (and in Europe by Crammed Discs). On February 15, 2009, Set 'Em Wild, Set 'Em Free leaked on the internet.

== Track listing ==
1. "Everyone Is Guilty" - 5:58
2. "River" - 4:46
3. "Creatures" - 4:13
4. "The Alps & Their Orange Evergreen" - 3:51
5. "Set 'Em Free, Pt.1" - 2:37
6. "Gravelly Mountains of the Moon" - 7:41
7. "Many Ghosts" - 4:05
8. "MBF" - 3:14
9. "They Will Appear" - 6:28
10. "Sun Will Shine (Warmth of the Sunship version)" - 5:13
11. "Last Year" - 1:40

== Charts ==
Chart (2009)	Peak position
U.S. Billboard Top Heatseekers	22
U.S. Billboard Independent Albums	50
