= Everything Is Good Here/Please Come Home =

2003 album

Studio album by Angels of Light
- Released: March 4, 2003
- Recorded: October 2002
- Studio: B.C. Studios (Brooklyn, New York)
- Length: 53:11
- Label: Young God
- Producer: Michael Gira

Angels of Light chronology
We Were Alive! (2002)	Everything Is Good Here/Please Come Home (2003)	Sing "Other People" (2005)

Everything Is Good Here/Please Come Home is the third studio album by Angels of Light. It was released on March 4, 2003, via band leader Michael Gira's own record label, Young God Records.

Produced by Gira himself and engineered by Martin Bisi, the album features extensive contributions from various musicians, including freak folk musician Devendra Banhart, Hungarian violinist Eszter Balint, drummer Thor Harris and composer Joe McGinty. Proceeds from the band's 2002 live album, We Were Alive!, were used to fund the production and recording of the album.

== Critical reception ==
Professional ratings
Review scores
Source	Rating
AllMusic	4/5 stars
Pitchfork	8.6/10
Stylus	B

Upon its release, Everything Is Good Here/Please Come Home generally received positive reviews from the music critics. Ned Raggett of AllMusic wrote: Michael Gira maintains the winning streak but explores a newer, more controlled delicacy on Everything is Good Here. He also further added that the album "finds his extremes of harrowing, wrenching music and performance, and a calmer, almost mystical approach, more integrated than ever before." Dominique Leone of Pitchfork praised the album, awarding it as "best new music." He stated: "The music that resonates with as much emotional weight and vital abandon is rare, and though I'm less inclined to look for answers in the mix than revel in its chaos, Everything Is Good Here/Please Come Home is a commendable, heady experience." Andrew Unterberger of Stylus Magazine also commented: "One of the greatest strengths of Everything is Good Here/Please Come Home is its ability to sound majestic without sounding epic – without all the cheesiness and pomposity that epic implies."

== Track listing ==
No.	Title	Length
1.	"Palisades"	4:27
2.	"All Souls' Rising"	6:16
3.	"Kosinski"	3:52
4.	"Nations"	6:47
5.	"The Family God"	4:39
6.	"Because She Was"	0:40
7.	"Rose of Los Angeles"	3:36
8.	"What You Were"	5:10
9.	"Sunset Park"	5:49
10.	"Wedding"	5:45
11.	"What Will Come"	6:10
Total length:		53:11

== Personnel ==
Angels of Light

- Michael Gira – vocals, composition, design, acoustic guitar, electric guitar, harmonica, piano, production

Additional musicians

- Eszter Balint – violin
- Devendra Banhart – vocals
- David Coulter – violin, banjo, children's choir arrangement
- Siobhan Duffy – vocals
- David Garland – accordion, flute
- Christopher Hahn – lap steel guitar, electric guitar
- Thor Harris – percussion, vibraphone, piano
- Dana Schechter - bass, piano, vocals, toy organ
- Joe McGinty – Fender Rhodes, piano, harmonium
- Larry Moses – trumpet
- Steve Moses – trombone
- Larry Mullins – drums, percussion, vibraphone, Farfisa organ, synthesizer, vocals
- Kevin O'Connor – banjo
- Pat Fondiller – bass, mandolin

Other personnel

- Martin Bisi – engineering
- Doug Henderson – mastering
- Ben Kirkendoll – layout design
- Jason LaFarge – engineering, recording
