= Akron / Family & Angels of Light =

Akron/Family & Angels of Light

Studio album by Akron/Family and Angels of Light
- Released: November 8, 2005
- Genres: Art rock; folk rock; psychedelic folk
- Length: 54:51
- Label: Young God
- Producers: Michael Gira, Akron/Family

Akron/Family chronology
| Akron/Family (2005) | Akron/Family & Angels of Light (2005) | Meek Warrior (2006) |

Angels of Light chronology
| The Angels of Light Sing 'Other People' (2005) | Akron/Family & Angels of Light (2005) | We Are Him (2007) |

Professional ratings
Aggregate scores
| Source | Rating |
|---|---|
| Metacritic | 81/100 |
Review scores
| Source | Rating |
| AllMusic | 3.5/5 stars |
| Alternative Press | 4/5 stars |
| Cokemachineglow | 83% |
| Mojo | 4/5 stars |
| Pitchfork | 8.0/10 |
| PopMatters | 7/10 |
| Q | 3.5/5 stars |
| Stylus | A |
| Tiny Mix Tapes | 4/5 marks |
| Under the Radar | 9/10 |

Akron/Family & Angels of Light is a split album between New York band Akron/Family and Michael Gira's band Angels of Light. It was released on November 8, 2005, via Gira's own record label, Young God Records.

The album features seven original songs by Akron/Family and three original songs by Angels of Light, plus a version of "Mother/Father" (originally performed by Gira's former group Swans, from the album, The Great Annihilator) and a cover of Bob Dylan's "I Pity the Poor Immigrant". Akron/Family play backing instruments on all of the Angels of Light tracks.

== Critical reception ==
Upon its release, Akron/Family & Angels of Light received positive reviews from music critics. At Metacritic, which assigns a normalized rating out of 100 to reviews from critics, the album received an average score of 81, which indicates "universal acclaim", based on 15 reviews. Tammy La Gorce of AllMusic stated: "Pair Akron/Family with Angels of Light and what you get, apologies to the label-sensitive, is Grade A art rock." About the collaboration, Sam Ubl of Pitchfork wrote: "Gira's fatherly measuredness is a nice foil to Akron's hyperkinetic mini-opera-- at this point, he may be overparenting, but damnit they'll thank him someday." Josh Honn of Stylus Magazine described the albums as "a blend of just about any sonic form one can recall ever hearing," while also further adding that "Gira’s relationship with Akron/Family have created what truly is, in the end, a complete album of epic scale, musical significance and a highly prescient lesson in listening, participating and challenging."

J. Spicer of Tiny Mix Tapes wrote: "This split album breaks new ground for Akron/Family while continuing to affirm Michael Gira as a reputable singer/songwriter," while also concluding that "Gira's influence on Akron/Family is heard throughout each track." PopMatters reviewer Justin Cober-Lake also commented on the album: "This album takes the energy from the live show and mixes it with the creativity of their stunning self-titled debut from earlier this year." Janne Oinonen of Gigwise also commented: "There's plenty to savour here, though, not least the chance to hear Akron Family rein in their genre-hopping tendencies to offer a suitably sparse backing to this stark set of songs that could well originate from the same desolate district as the dustblown gems on Mark Lanegan's Field Songs."

== Track listing ==
Tracks 1–7 are written by Seth Olinsky, Miles Seaton, Dana Gene Janssen and Ryan Vanderhoof. Tracks 9–12 are written by Michael Gira.

| No. | Title | Writer(s) | Artist | Length |
|---|---|---|---|---|
| 1. | "Awake" | | Akron/Family | 2:30 |
| 2. | "Moment" | | Akron/Family | 5:20 |
| 3. | "We All Will" | | Akron/Family | 4:29 |
| 4. | "Future Myth" | | Akron/Family | 8:12 |
| 5. | "Dylan Pt. 2" | | Akron/Family | 4:36 |
| 6. | "Oceanside" | | Akron/Family | 3:36 |
| 7. | "Raising the Sparks" | | Akron/Family | 4:16 |
| 8. | "I Pity the Poor Immigrant" | Bob Dylan | Angels of Light | 3:56 |
| 9. | "The Provider" | | Angels of Light | 6:55 |
| 10. | "One For Hope" | | Angels of Light | 3:01 |
| 11. | "Mother/Father" | | Angels of Light | 2:45 |
| 12. | "Come for My Woman" | | Angels of Light | 5:15 |
| Total length: | | | | 54:51 |

== Personnel ==
The album personnel, as adapted from Allmusic:

Akron/Family

- Seth Olinsky – performance
- Miles Seaton – performance
- Dana Gene Janssen – performance
- Ryan Vanderhoof – performance

Angels of Light

- Michael Gira – art direction, design, production, performance (8–12)

Other personnel

- Bryce Goggin – engineering, mixing, performance
- Drew Goren – photography
- Doug Henderson – mastering
- Ben Kirkendoll – design, layout design
