= Gimme Gimme =

Gimme Gimme may refer to:

- "Gimme Gimme" (Inna song), 2017
- "Gimme Gimme" (Whigfield song), 1996
- "Yurayura/Gimme Gimme", 2010 single by Beni
- "Gimme Gimme", a song from Shihad's 1996 album Killjoy
- "Gimme Gimme", song from the musical Thoroughly Modern Millie
- "Gimme Gimme", a 2009 song by Beenie Man
- "Gimme Gimme", a song by Katy Perry featuring 21 Savage from the 2024 album 143

== See also ==
- Gimme (disambiguation)
- Gimme Gimme Gimme (disambiguation)
- Me First and the Gimme Gimmes
- Gimme More, 2007 single by Britney Spears
