= Meek Warrior =

Studio album by Akron/Family
- Released: October 3, 2006
- Genre: Psychedelic folk
- Length: 35:27
- Label: Young God
- Producer: Akron/Family; Michael Gira

Akron/Family chronology
Akron/Family & Angels of Light (2005)	Meek Warrior (2006)	Love Is Simple (2007)

Professional ratings
Aggregate scores
Source	Rating
Metacritic	73/100
Review scores
Source	Rating
AllMusic	4/5 stars
Outsideleft	
Pitchfork	(7.2/10)
Tiny Mix Tapes	3/5 stars

Meek Warrior is the second album by Akron/Family, released in 2006. The cover art uses a picture of the Crab Nebula. The title is possibly a reference to the concept of warriorship in the Shambhala tradition: the first step on the warrior's path is to become meek.

== Track listing ==
1. "Blessing Force" – 9:29
2. "Gone Beyond" – 3:22
3. "Meek Warrior" – 2:17
4. "No Space in This Realm" – 5:12
5. "Lightning Bolt of Compassion" – 4:10
6. "The Rider (Dolphin Song)" – 7:20
7. "Love and Space" – 3:37
