= Top Dollar =

Studio album by Toby Dammit
- Released: June 12, 2001
- Recorded: August 1999 – January 2000
- Length: 45:40
- Label: Omplatten
- Producer: Bertrand Burgalat, Johan Kugelberg, Larry Mullins

Toby Dammit chronology
Top Dollar (2001)	Karny Sutra (2004)

Professional ratings
Review scores
Source	Rating
AllMusic	4.5/5 stars
Pitchfork Media	(8.0/10)

Top Dollar is the debut solo album of multi-instrumentalist Larry Mullins, recorded under his nickname Toby Dammit, released on June 12, 2001, through Omplatten.

== Track listing ==
All tracks are written by Toby Dammit.

No.	Title	Length
1.	"Number One Famous"	5:33
2.	"Modus Operandi"	7:34
3.	"Roadblocks Here and Here"	7:15
4.	"Jolly Coppers on Parade"	4:29
5.	"Malmö Nocturne (Månsson's Theme)"	4:58
6.	"Escape From Fire Island (An Erotic Fantasy)"	15:51

== Personnel ==
Adapted from the Top Dollar liner notes.

- Larry Mullins (as Toby Dammit) – drums, percussion, vocals, arrangements, production, engineering

=== Musicians ===
- Bertrand Burgalat – R.M.I. Electric Harpsichord, production
- Kate Fenker (as Wanda Dammit) – vocals (1, 3)

=== Production and additional personnel ===
- Doug Henderson – engineering, mixing
- Johan Kugelberg – production
- Frank Longo – art direction
- Matt Merman – mastering
- Dave Sardy – mixing

== Release history ==
Region	Date	Label	Format	Catalog
United States	2000	Omplatten	CD, LP	FJORD 008
