= Sub Verses =

Studio album by Akron/Family
- Released: April 30, 2013
- Recorded: Jun 2010
- Genres: Folk, psychedelic rock, experimental rock
- Length: 50:22
- Label: Dead Oceans
- Producer: Randall Dunn

Akron/Family chronology
Akron/Family II: The Cosmic Birth and Journey of Shinju TNT (2011)	Sub Verses (2013)

Sub Verses is the sixth and final studio album by experimental rock band Akron/Family. It was released on April 30, 2013, on Dead Oceans Records.

== Recording and release ==
The album was recorded in Seattle and El Paso and was produced by Randall Dunn.

== Reception ==
Professional ratings
Aggregate scores
Source	Rating
Metacritic	72/100
Review scores
Source	Rating
AllMusic	4.5/5 stars
Beats Per Minute	68%
Consequence of Sound	3/5 stars
musicOMH	3/5 stars
Pitchfork	7.0/10
PopMatters	6/10
This Is Fake DIY	7/10

Sub Verses has received generally positive reviews so far.

Thom Jurek of AllMusic praised the album, writing "Sub Verses offers such a disciplined sense of exploration, multivalent nuance, and commitment in its production and performance; it stands out in an already very distinguished catalog." This Is Fake DIY's Anna Byrne wrote that while "Some of the extremes on the album feel awkward - the heavy metal too heavy, the loops of death overlooped, the calm too suddenly silent," Sub Verses is "a deep, yawning collection of exciting musical experiments to dunk yourself into."

Jordan Mainzer gave Sub Verses a mixed review, writing "Sub Verses may be genre hopping, but it’s not a particularly challenging listen as compared to its predecessors, albums that were both challenging and fun."

== Track listing ==
No.	Title	Length
1.	"No-Room"	6:43
2.	"Way Up"	5:12
3.	"Until the Morning"	5:00
4.	"Sand Talk"	4:32
5.	"Sometimes I"	4:55
6.	"Holy Boredom"	4:09
7.	"Sand Time"	3:10
8.	"Whole World Is Watching"	5:21
9.	"When I Was Young"	6:05
10.	"Samurai"	5:15

== Personnel ==
The following people contributed to Sub Verses:

Akron/Family

- Dana Janssen
- Seth Olinsky
- Miles Seaton

Additional personnel

- Randall Dunn - Engineer, mixing, producer
- Michael Gira - Quotation author
- Charles Godfrey - Assistant engineer
- Eyvind Kang - String arrangements
- Jason Kardong - Pedal steel
- Jessika Kenney - Vocals
- TJ Nelson - Band photo
- Stephen O'Malley - Design
- Leanne Pedante - Vocals
- Robert Pinsky - Composer, lyricist
- Skerik - Horn
- Jason Ward - Mastering
