= Gimme Gimme Gimme =

Gimme Gimme Gimme may refer to:

- Gimme Gimme Gimme (TV series), a 1999–2001 British sitcom
- "Gimme, Gimme, Gimme" (Narada Michael Walden song), 1985
- "Gimme! Gimme! Gimme! (A Man After Midnight)", a 1979 song by ABBA
- "Gimme, Gimme, Gimme", a 1980 song by Blackfoot from Tomcattin'
- Gimme Gimme Gimme, a 2000 album, or its title song, by E-Rotic
- "Gimmie Gimmie Gimmie", a 1981 song by Black Flag from Damaged
- Gimmie Gimmie Gimmie: Reinterpreting Black Flag, a 2010 album

== See also ==
- Gimme (disambiguation)
- Gimme Gimme (disambiguation)
