= Love Is Simple =

Studio album by Akron/Family
- Released: September 18, 2007
- Genres: Psychedelic rock, freak folk, experimental rock, New Weird America
- Length: 56:51
- Label: Young God Records
- Producers: Andrew Weiss, Akron/Family

Akron/Family chronology
Meek Warrior (2005)	Love Is Simple (2007)	Set 'Em Wild, Set 'Em Free (2009)

Professional ratings
Aggregate scores
Source	Rating
Metacritic	74/100 link
Review scores
Source	Rating
Pitchfork	(7.8/10) link
PopMatters	(8/10) link
Prefix Magazine	(8/10) link
Tiny Mix Tapes	link

Love Is Simple is the third studio album by experimental rock band Akron/Family. It was released on September 18, 2007, on Young God Records.

The band referred to the album as "the completion of [their] first cycle... both a love letter to the past and a launching pad into the future. And in a way not before captured, this record has the unmistakable field holler of friendship and brotherhood".

== Recording ==
Of the album's creation process and recording for the first time with producer Andrew Weiss, the band said,

"And so from songs inside our heads, and words on papers in accordian [sic] folders, and playing in Seth's parent's garage and getting yelled at by neighbors, we took these songs to Canada and then settled down with them in the woods of New Jersey to record with Andrew Weiss… We met Andrew at a bowling alley in Asbury Park, those same Springsteen stomping grounds. All long hair and glasses and sandals and cigaretted he invited us to his house to record... Andrew challenged us in ways unforeseen. He fed us copious amounts of stovetop espresso 3 hours past bedtime, he told us how Neil Young had always eaten a huge bowl of pasta right before a show, he reminded us that the records we loved and grew up on all lived in "no place", that Hall and Oates didn't get it right until their 10th try, and finally, he made us try again, and again, and again."

== Reception ==
The album received favorable reviews upon release. Tiny Mix Tapes found it to be "the band's strongest release to date," citing their developing songwriting skills, careful arrangements, and explosive energy and exuberance. Eric Harvey of Pitchfork said "the record is bursting at its seams with lovingly and vividly realized ideas culled from a broad selection of prior works... Simple's greatest success might be that it holds together as a single work despite the general senselessness of its basic narrative." Matthew Fiander from PopMatters noted the transformation of the band's live sound into a studio recording, saying "While the band knows there is energy in their live act, they are also smart enough to know that it would not work as a direct translation. Instead, they've smartly taken elements of their live show -- a heightened guitar presence, a more "electric" sound, energetic percussion—and meshed it with their ability to craft the beautifully quiet. The results are not only boot-in-the-ass surprising, but also the best thing the band has done to date."

== Track listing ==
1. "Love, Love, Love (Everyone)" - 1.46
2. "Ed Is a Portal" - 7:31
3. "Don't Be Afraid, You're Already Dead" - 4:35*
4. "I've Got Some Friends" - 3:09
5. "Lake Song/New Ceremonial Music for Moms" - 7:24
6. "There's So Many Colors" - 8:11
7. "Crickets" - 3:59
8. "Phenomena" - 3:46
9. "Pony's O.G." - 5:19
10. "Of All the Things" - 7:41
11. "Love, Love, Love 2 (Reprise)" - 3:07

== DVD track listing ==
The band also released a limited edition CD/DVD of the band's "The Great American Mess Tour 2006". The live footage was shot at various locations while on tour.

1. "Awake"
2. "Moment"
3. "Suchness"
4. "Running, Returning"
5. "Blessing Force"
6. "Afford"
7. "Raising the Sparks"
8. "I'll Be On The Water"
9. "Future Myth"
10. "Love And Space"

== Personnel ==
=== Akron/Family ===
- Dana Janssen
- Seth Olinsky
- Miles Seaton
- Ryan Vanderhoof

=== Additional personnel ===
- Andrew Weiss - producer, engineer, mixing
- Bryce Goggin - mixing
- Ethan Donaldson - mixing
- Fred Kavorkian - mastering
- Mike Penque - fiddle
- John Gnorski - lap steel
- Mike Kammers - saxophone
- Joe Beatty - trombone
- Matt Motel - synthesizer
- The Lexie Mountain Boys - vocals
- The Tivoli Singers - vocals
