= How I Loved You =

2001 album

Studio album by Angels of Light
- Released: March 27, 2001
- Genre: Folk rock
- Length: 69:57
- Label: Young God
- Producer: Michael Gira

Angels of Light chronology
New Mother (1999)	How I Loved You (2001)	We Were Alive! (2002)

How I Loved You is the second studio album by American folk rock band Angels of Light. Produced by band leader Michael Gira, it was released on March 27, 2001, via Gira's own record label, Young God Records. The album features contributions from Bee and Flower bassist and vocalist Dana Schechter, drummer Thor Harris, singer-songwriter Bliss Blood and ex-Nick Cave and the Bad Seeds guitarist Kid Congo Powers.

The cover art of the album depicts Gira's mother, Alice Schulte Gira, while the back cover features a picture of his father, Robert Pierre Gira.

== Background ==
On the album's composition, band leader Michael Gira wrote on the website for Young God Records:

"I wrote the songs over the last couple of years. As it turns out, they're all love songs, in one form or another. The songs started out with just my voice and acoustic guitar, and then developed naturally over time by playing them with my friends, whose collaboration and contributions are positively inspirational, to me anyway. Our combined sensibilities feel very natural at this point, which I guess comes from having played most of the songs live a lot. The songs were recorded live in the studio, then subjected to my usual lapses of over-orchestration. In this case though, I think I reigned myself in, and the final sound/picture seems to fit organically with the basic songs and lyrics."

== Critical reception ==
Professional ratings
Review scores
Source	Rating
AllMusic	4.5/5 stars
NME	7/10
Pitchfork	4.8/10

The album generally received positive reviews from music critics. Thom Jurek of AllMusic wrote: "Angels of Light's How I Loved You moves far from that terrain and into a zone of languid reverie, bittersweet longing, and crystalline excess," while also stating that the record "reveals, once more, that for Michael Gira and his Angels of Light, there are no contradictions, no gods, and no monsters in the caverns of love's secret domain." John Robinson of NME stated: "Like a dark meeting place for a tryst between Nick Cave and Sonic Youth, they take a funereal subject matter (e.g. "My Suicide"), and expand it over beautifully arranged and very huge spaces of time". Wilson Neate of PopMatters wrote: "Leonard Cohen once recorded a rather dark album called Songs of Love and Hate. The Angels of Light’s How I Loved You makes that record sound like a children’s birthday party," while another PopMatters reviewer, Jason Thompson, commented: "How I Loved You is a successful and unique collection of love songs." The latter writer also described the album as "harrowing, but passionate."

Nevertheless, Richard M. Juzwiak of Pitchfork gave the album a negative review, stating: "The fact that Gira attempts the monumental, snug fit is admirable. Sure, he sounds like he means what he's saying, but his esoteric words seem born more out of self-satisfaction than pleasing listeners. Ultimately, conviction does not compensate for inaccessibility; Gira's calluses, you see, sound much more like warts."

== Track listing ==
All tracks are written by Michael Gira.

No.	Title	Length
1.	"Evangeline"	8:45
2.	"Untitled Love Song"	4:49
3.	"My True Body"	6:03
4.	"Jennifer's Sorry"	3:38
5.	"Song for Nico"	4:08
6.	"New City in the Future*"	11:54
7.	"My Suicide"	5:35
8.	"New York Girls"	8:11
9.	"Public Embarrassment Blues"	4:47
10.	"Two Women"	11:48
Total length:		69:57

- On the physical CD, track 6 is labeled "New City in the Future", on all digital releases it is labeled "New York City in the Future".

== Personnel ==
Angels of Light

- Michael Gira – vocals, acoustic and electric guitar, production

Additional personnel

- Kristof Hahn – lap steel guitar, electric guitar
- Dana Schechter – bass guitar, piano, melodica, backing vocals
- Larry Mullins – drums, vibraphone, timpani, Farfisa vip 600 organ, sleigh bells, tambourine, castanets, glockenspiel
- Birgit-Cassis Staudt – accordion, melodica, Cassio, piano, backing vocals
- Thor Harris – hammered dulcimer, piano, backing vocals
- Bliss Blood – backing vocals (2), double vocal (2), ukulele
- Siobhan Duffy – backing vocals (5), double vocal (5)
- Kid Congo Powers – additional electric guitar (3, 8)
- Doug Henderson – editing, engineering, mixing, overdubbing
- Chad Swanberg – engineering
