= Patric Chocolate =

American chocolate manufacturer

- Industry: Chocolate
- Founded: April 30, 2006 in Columbia, Missouri, United States
- Founders: Alan Patrick McClure, PhD
- Headquarters: Columbia, Missouri, United States
- Number of locations: 1 production plant
- Area served: United States
- Products: Chocolate, Confections
- Owners: Alan Patrick McClure, PhD
- Number of employees: 2
- Website: www.patric-chocolate.com

Patric Chocolate is a bean-to-bar, craft-chocolate manufacturer and chocolate consulting firm founded in 2006 by Alan Patrick McClure (born November, 1978). McClure remains owner and head of chocolate research and development at Patric Chocolate, as well as consultant to the food and beverage industry through Patric Food & Beverage Development.

== History ==
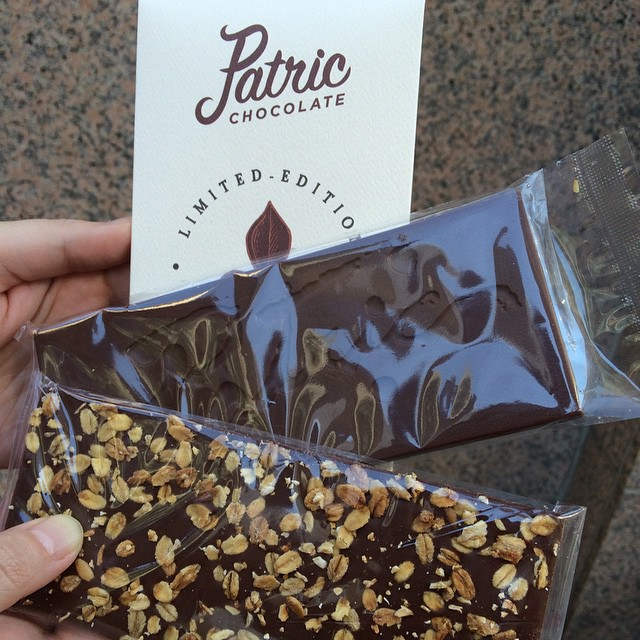
Patric bars; one has nuts, one is plain

After founding Patric Chocolate, McClure sold his first chocolate, the 70% Sambirano Valley single-origin bar, in July 2007. The company grew over the next eight years, managing to remain in operation during the Great Recession, and expanded the availability of its products through increased production, distribution, and online sales. After years of growth and accolades, founder Alan McClure made the decision to return to graduate school, while continuing to operate Patric Chocolate, to improve the scientific foundation of the company's research & development approach. Thus, in 2014 McClure began his study in the sciences, including chocolate science, flavor chemistry and sensory analysis, and in September 2020 successfully defended his chocolate-focused doctoral research, earning him a PhD in Food Science from the University of Missouri, where he conducted research in the Milton Bailey Flavor Chemistry Laboratory and in conjunction with the Sensory Evaluation Center of Penn State. McClure's research made use of analytical flavor chemistry, sensory analysis, experimental design, and current methods of statistical learning and data visualization, to better understand the unique bitterness of chocolate, how it changes with cacao roasting, and its relationship to chocolate consumer perceptions and preferences. Upon graduation, McClure announced the expansion of the craft-food consulting component of Patric Chocolate in to include other fermentation-based foods, ingredient and product development. This new division, Patric Food & Beverage Development, is focused on food and beverage product development, product and process optimization, and science-based technical solutions.

== Chocolate bars and other products ==
Patric Chocolate bars are handcrafted from cocoa beans sourced directly from farms or cooperatives. Over the years, the company's line has included more than thirty different bean-to-bar chocolate bars, a variety of house-made confections, chocolate beverages, chocolate bakery items, and many other chocolate products. Patric Chocolate has always crafted its premium chocolate from bean-to-bar while incorporating many practices over time that emphasize sustainability, such as sourcing mostly certified organic ingredients, purchasing cacao for higher than conventional prices, and placing an emphasis on recycling and renewable energy use.

== Awards and features ==
As of 2021, Patric Chocolate has won a total of twenty-six Good Food Awards, more than any other entrant in any category, an achievement first celebrated publicly at the 10th annual Good Food Awards ceremony in 2020. This decade-long winning streak led to McClure's swift announcement of the retirement of Patric Chocolate from the awards in order to allow for more collaborative and less competitive relationships with other chocolate and food companies. Patric Chocolate's Good Food Award wins (below) remain a record:

- 2020 Winners: 67% Madagascar, 67% Piura Peru, Browned Butter Bar.
- 2019 Winners: 75% Madagascar, Triple Ginger.
- 2018 Winners: 67% Madagascar, 70% Signature Blend, The Salty Cow, Browned Butter Bar.
- 2017 Winners: Piura Dark Milk, Sweet & Sassy.
- 2016 Winners: Browned Butter Bar, Triple Ginger, Red Coconut Curry.
- 2015 Winners: 67% Madagascar, Black Licorice Bar, PBJ OMG, Red Coconut Curry.
- 2014 Winners: 70% Signature Blend, Mocha OMG, Mint CRUNCH.
- 2013 Winners: In-NIB-itable, 67% Madagascar, 75% Madagascar.
- 2012 Winner: 70% Signature Blend.
- 2011 Winner: In-NIB-itable.

In 2017, Zagat proclaimed that Alan McClure of Patric Chocolate "makes some of the best chocolate bars in the world" which "are in high demand."

In December 2015, The New York Times conducted a taste test of chocolate bars made from scratch. Patric Chocolate's 67% Madagascar bar was placed in the #2 spot of only 8 bars chosen as "most impressive."

In September 2013, Patric Chocolate won two of only seven awards given for bean-to-bar chocolate products at the Northwest Chocolate Festival, including a gold for the In-NIB-itable Bar in the inclusion category, and a Silver for the 67% Madagascar in the plain chocolate category.

In October 2013, Patric Chocolate won six prizes in the Americas arm of the International Chocolate Awards: two golds and four silvers for the 67% Madagascar, 67% Piura, and Mocha OMG.

In October 2013, Patric Chocolate won two prizes in the World Finals of the International Chocolate Awards for the 67% Madagascar and 67% Piura dark chocolate bars.

Patric Chocolate was also featured Food & Wine's article Taste's to Try: Best New American Chocolate

== See also ==
- List of bean-to-bar chocolate manufacturers
