= Good Food Awards =

American awards given annually for responsibly-produced foods

- Sponsored by: Good Food Retailers Collaborative
- Location: San Francisco, California
- Country: United States of America
- Presented by: Good Food Foundation
- First award: 2011
- Categories: beer, charcuterie, cheese, chocolate, cider, coffee, confections, elixirs, fish, grains, honey, oils, pantry, pickles, preserves, snacks, spirits

The Good Food Awards or GFAs is an annual award competition for outstanding American craft food producers and the farmers who provide their ingredients. Created by the Good Food Foundation (formerly Seedling Projects), the Good Food Awards take place in San Francisco and are designed to celebrate foods that are "tasty, authentic, and responsibly produced." An annual Awards Ceremony and Marketplace is held to honor the Good Food Award recipients who push their industries towards craftsmanship and sustainability while enhancing our agricultural landscape and building strong communities. The Good Food Awards have been particularly notable in the coffee industry. As of the 2021 Good Food Awards, Patric Chocolate has won twenty-six awards, more than any other entrant.

== Criteria ==
The criteria for the Good Food Awards vary by industry, however basic rules say that entries must be made without genetically modified ingredients, using good animal husbandry, "without the use of artificial ingredients, hormones, synthetic pesticides, herbicides, fertilizer," and crafted in the USA. There are currently seventeen categories in which awards are given: beer, charcuterie, cheese, chocolate, cider, coffee, confections, elixirs, fish, grains, honey, oils, pantry, pickles, preserves, snacks, and spirits. Additionally, many of the categories have subcategories.

== Rules ==
Up to three entries are allowed per producer in all categories except for coffee. Up to two entries are allowed per coffee producer, each from a different country of origin. Producers must wait one year to re-enter a Good Food Award winning product "to pave the way for new products and entry-level producers."

There is a non-refundable entry fee for each submission, to cover storage, sorting and transport to the tasting venue. Shipping and product costs for entries must be covered by the entrant.

Products must be made in a licensed kitchen, or as required by state and local regulations, and be ready for sale. If produced by a copacker (or for Fish, a cannery or processor), the product must be made from the entrant’s recipe, with strict sourcing guidelines set by the entrant and with regular quality control measures set in place. Ingredients that are part of an entry that falls into one of the other Good Food Awards categories must also meet the sustainability standards of those categories.

Entrants who score well in the Blind Tasting are then asked to provide more information on sourcing and their sustainability and social responsibility practices to verify they meet the Good Food Awards standards details listed in the entry form. Entrants are disqualified if they do not meet the standards or any statements made are found to be false.
