= Where Does a Body End? =

2019 film

- Film poster
- Directed by: Marco Porsia
- Release date: May 3, 2019 (Portugal)
- Running time: 161 minutes
- Country: Canada
- Language: English

Where Does a Body End? is a 2019 Canadian documentary film directed by Marco Porsia about the American experimental rock band Swans. The film had its premiere on May 3, 2019, at the IndieLisboa Film Festival in Portugal. The film was released worldwide on September 11, 2020.
