= Angels of Light =

American band

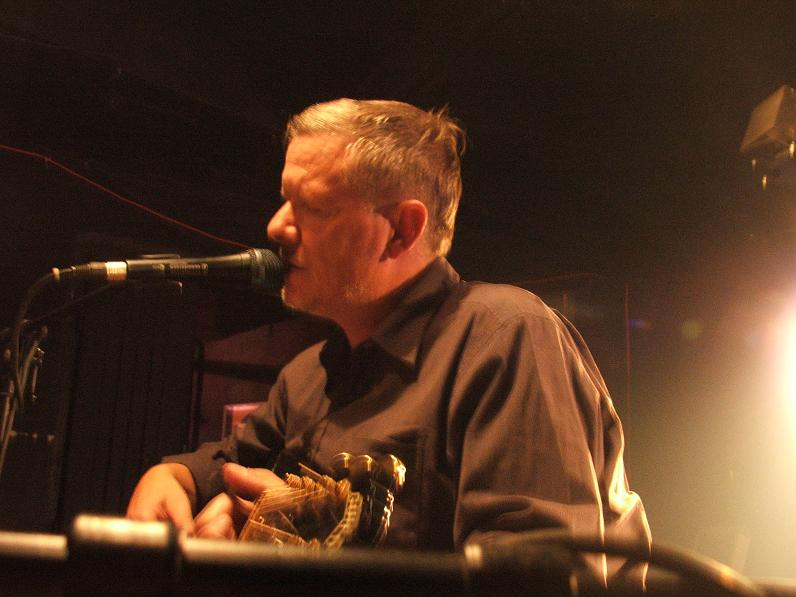
- Angels of Light (Michael Gira with Akron/Family) during a concert in Warsaw, Poland, October 8, 2005

Background information
- Origin: New York City, New York, United States
- Genres: Americana; alternative country; folk; neofolk
- Years active: 1998–2009
- Labels: Young God
- Spinoff of: Swans
- Members: Michael Gira

Angels of Light was an American neofolk band that was formed circa 1998 by singer-songwriter and musician Michael Gira after he disbanded Swans, the group he had founded in 1982. The band has marked a distinctly different style for Gira since he left Swans, most noticeably being musically more melodic and less brutal than his previous efforts and with emphasis on acoustic instruments and folk and country influences.

Before the band was formed, Gira intended to call his post-Swans acoustic/song-based project the Pleasure Seekers. This name was discarded because there had been a group with the same name in the 1960s. The first two live performances of what would become the Angels of Light (the Tonic/Bowery Ballroom benefit shows) were billed as "Michael Gira with guests".

The revolving lineup up Angels of Light included a wide range of musicians from New York City and elsewhere, including Dana Schechter of Bee and Flower, Kid Congo Powers of the Cramps, Larry Mullins (a.k.a. Toby Dammit), Cassis Birgit Staudt of b-blush, Bliss Blood of the Moonlighters, Thor Harris of Shearwater, Swans guitarist Kristof Hahn, Phil Puleo of Cop Shoot Cop, and freak-folk musician Devendra Banhart. On The Angels of Light Sing 'Other People' and We Are Him, Gira was backed by Brooklyn band Akron/Family. Hahn, Harris and Puleo went on to join Gira in the new Swans lineup assembled in 2010. Shortly thereafter Swans released their first post-reunion LP My Father Will Guide Me up a Rope to the Sky.

All Angels of Light albums were released on Michael Gira's label Young God Records.

== Discography ==
Studio albums

- New Mother (1999)
- How I Loved You (2001)
- Everything Is Good Here/Please Come Home (2003)
- The Angels of Light Sing 'Other People' (2005)
- Akron/Family & Angels of Light (2005) – split album with Akron/Family.
- We Are Him (2007)

Live albums

- We Were Alive! (2002)

Singles

- "Praise Your Name" (1999)
