= Akron/Family =

American experimental folk band

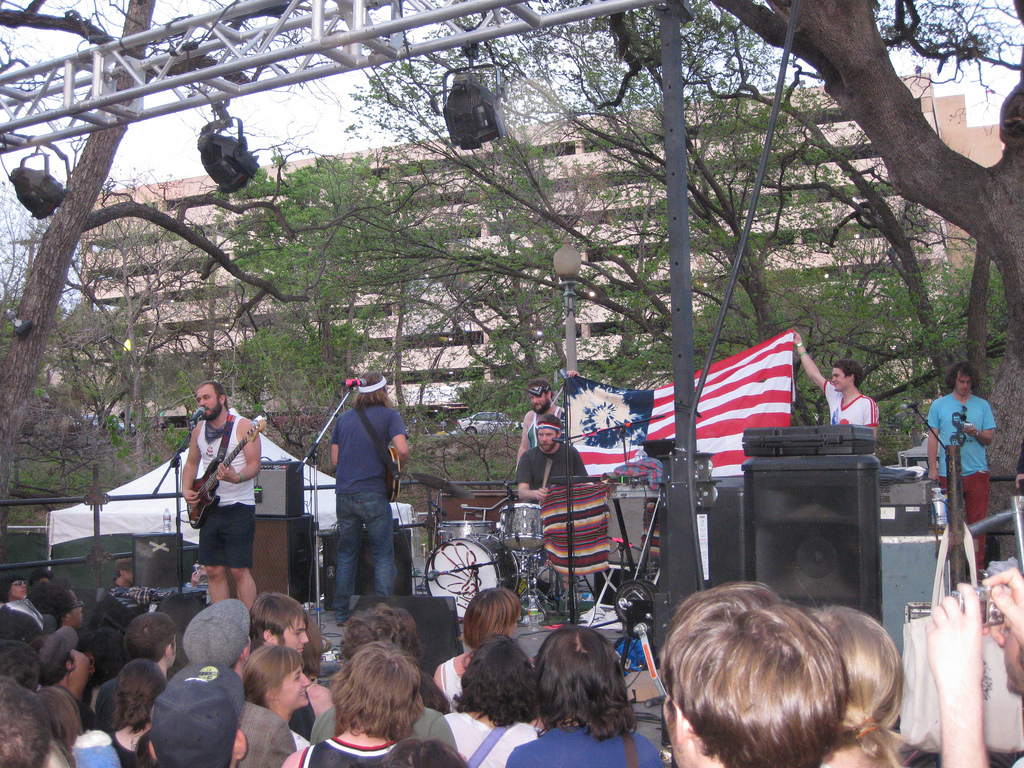
- Akron/Family at the 2009 SXSW festival

Background information
- Origin: Williamsburg, Brooklyn, New York
- Genres: Indie folk, freak folk, psychedelic rock, experimental rock
- Years active: 2002–2013
- Labels: Young God, Dead Oceans, Joyful Noise
- Past members: Dana Janssen; Seth Olinsky; Ryan Vanderhoof; Miles Seaton; Phil Cook; Greg Davis; Chris Koltay; Mark Lawson

Akron/Family were an American folk-influenced experimental rock band active from 2002 to 2013. Former members have lived in Portland, Oregon; Los Angeles, California; and Joshua Tree, California.

== Music and history ==
Though each member of the band—Dana Janssen, Seth Olinsky, and Miles Seaton—could be assigned to loosely defined roles, each played several instruments and sang. Improvisation and three-part harmonies were prominent features, both live and on recording: their eponymous debut release included field recordings of a creaking chair, thunderclaps and the white noise from an untuned analog television, with psychedelic and electronic elements, guitars, and a glockenspiel.

=== Early years (2003–2006) ===
Between 2003 and 2007, the band was the hub of a social scene in Williamsburg, Brooklyn, that revolved around the "Gimme! Coffee" coffee shop. Many of the events of this period served as material for songs.

In 2003, the band began sending demos to Young God Records label head Michael Gira, who announced the following year their signing to the label. Akron/Family, culled from several albums' worth of material recorded in the band's Brooklyn apartment, was released in March 2005. The Wire wrote "Akron/Family's hushed left field pastoralism invite comparison with the loose US scene of folk-derived weirdness...Immaculately interwoven electronics and the care with which each beautifully recorded track unfolds recall Chicago post-rock..." (Davies 2005).

Released that same month was Angels of Light's Sing "Other People", on which Akron/Family served as the main backing band. Several extensive tours of the United States and Europe with Gira — playing as Angels of Light — followed immediately afterward, lasting much of the rest of the year. In the stretches supporting Gira, the band played dual roles as both the supporting and headlining act; in the stretches without Gira, their touring mates included Great Lake Swimmers and Sir Richard Bishop of Sun City Girls.

The next Akron/Family material released was Akron/Family & Angels of Light, a split album with Angels of Light in October 2005. Shortly after releasing Meek Warrior in October 2006, the band debuted seven demo songs on WNYC radio, suggesting another album was in the works. The band has contributed vocals to Canadian post-rock band Do Make Say Think's albums You, You're a History in Rust and Other Truths.

=== Love Is Simple (2007) ===
In September 2007, it was announced that original member Ryan Vanderhoof departed the group "amicably sometime between the completion of (2007 release) Love Is Simple and the start of the band's U.S. tour" according to Akron/Family's publicist. The reasoning behind his departure was that "he went to live in a Buddhist Dharma center (Tsogyelgar/Flaming Jewel) in the Midwest." The Akron/Family tour in September 2007 included supporting acts Megafaun and Greg Davis who joined the Akron/Family onstage to create a seven-piece band. Megafaun and Greg Davis also played in Akron/Family band for their October 2007 west coast tour. The Dodos played the opening sets on this tour. In Spring 2008, the band toured with Megafaun as their supporting act. In addition to opening, all three members of Megafaun joined Akron/Family onstage to create a six-piece band.

=== Set 'Em Wild, Set Em Free (2008–2011) ===
On October 5, 2008, the News section of Akron/Family's official website was updated to announce that the band had begun recording a new album. The album, titled Set 'Em Wild, Set Em Free was released on May 5, 2009, by Dead Oceans Records. On February 15, 2009 Set 'Em Wild, Set Em Free leaked onto the Internet. Throughout the late summer and into Fall 2009, Akron/Family headlined a tour with Slaraffenland as the opening band and Jeffrey Lewis and the Junkyard serving as lead support. Slaraffenland also contributed in much of Akron/Family's set, playing percussion and horns.

=== S/T II:The Cosmic Birth and Journey of Shinju TNT (2011–2012) ===
Akron/Family sent out an email confirming the title of their following album, writing "This album is titled S/T II: The Cosmic Birth and Journey of Shinju TNT. We have no idea what that means. After the jump, you’ll find a photo of the note found in the brown box delivery with the song list, video, and an mp3 of the song fragments retrieved from the TDK CDR, relics of a new tomorrow and a brighter Akron/Family filled future. These are the beginnings, hell or high water you’ll find S/T II: The Cosmic Birth and Journey of Shinju TNT in stores in the U.S. on February 8, and March 14 in the U.K."

A suspected version of the album was leaked to the Internet on December 24, 2010, but there was a dispute on numerous message boards and filesharing communities whether or not it was the actual album or a remixed version leaked by the band due to the radically different nature of the material. A different, second version of the album was leaked on December 28, 2010, confirming suspicions that the band was leaking alternate mixes of the album. The actual album leaked on January 13. It is suspected there are six different mixes circulating as well as the official release. A compilation of the leaked, remixed and deconstructed, versions of the album was released as the <bmbz> 2LP on Record Store Day 2011. The member listing for this release is Phil Cook, Greg Davis, Dana Janssen, Chris Koltay, Mark Lawson, Seth Olinsky, and Miles Seaton.

The band appears on Swans' 2012 album The Seer on the track "A Piece of the Sky". During this time, the band was involved in a public spat for "lifting" a skull logo for its merchandise from California powerviolence band Man Is the Bastard.

=== Sub Verses and breakup (2013–present) ===
Akron/Family's sixth studio album Sub Verses was released April 30, 2013, on Dead Oceans. The band began their tour for the album on January 29, 2013, and concluded on December 8. After their 2013 tour, Akron/Family decided to quit to focus on personal side projects, leaving the door open for a possible reunion in the future. Meanwhile, front man Olinsky started his own band Cy Dune and co-created Lightning Records, Janssen started the band Dana Buoy and Seaton pursued a solo career under his own name.

Miles Seaton died at age 41 in a single-car accident in February 2021, preventing the possibility of a future reunion.

== Discography ==
=== Studio albums ===
- Akron/Family (2005)
- Akron/Family & Angels of Light (2005)
- Meek Warrior (2006)
- Love Is Simple (2007)
- Set 'Em Wild, Set 'Em Free (2009)
- Akron/Family II: The Cosmic Birth and Journey of Shinju TNT (2011)
- Sub Verses (2013)

=== Other albums ===
- Eskimo (2003, self-released) CDR, 16 tracks
- Franny & The Portal to the Fractal Universe of Positive Vibrations (2003; self-released) CDR, 13 tracks.
- Intimate (2003, self-released) CDR, 6 tracks
- Akron (2005, self-released) CD, 7 tracks
- Akron/Family 2006 Tour CD (2006; self-released) – 25 track collection of recordings from 2002 to 2005 sold on tour, limited to 1000 copies.
- Sparrow Trout Heart Sprout (2007; Achord Recordings) – 3-CD set from Seth Olinsky under the name Best of Seth, limited to 500 copies.
- Akron/Family, Greg Davis, and Megafaun OM EP (2007; self-released) – 8 track collection of live recordings and alternate versions sold on tour, limited to 1000 copies.
- Totem – Improv Series 1 (2010; self-released) – 14 track collection of improvisation recordings

== Bibliography ==
- Davies, Sam. "Akron/Family." The Wire. April 2005.
