= Gimme! Coffee =

Chain of espresso bars in the state of New York, USA

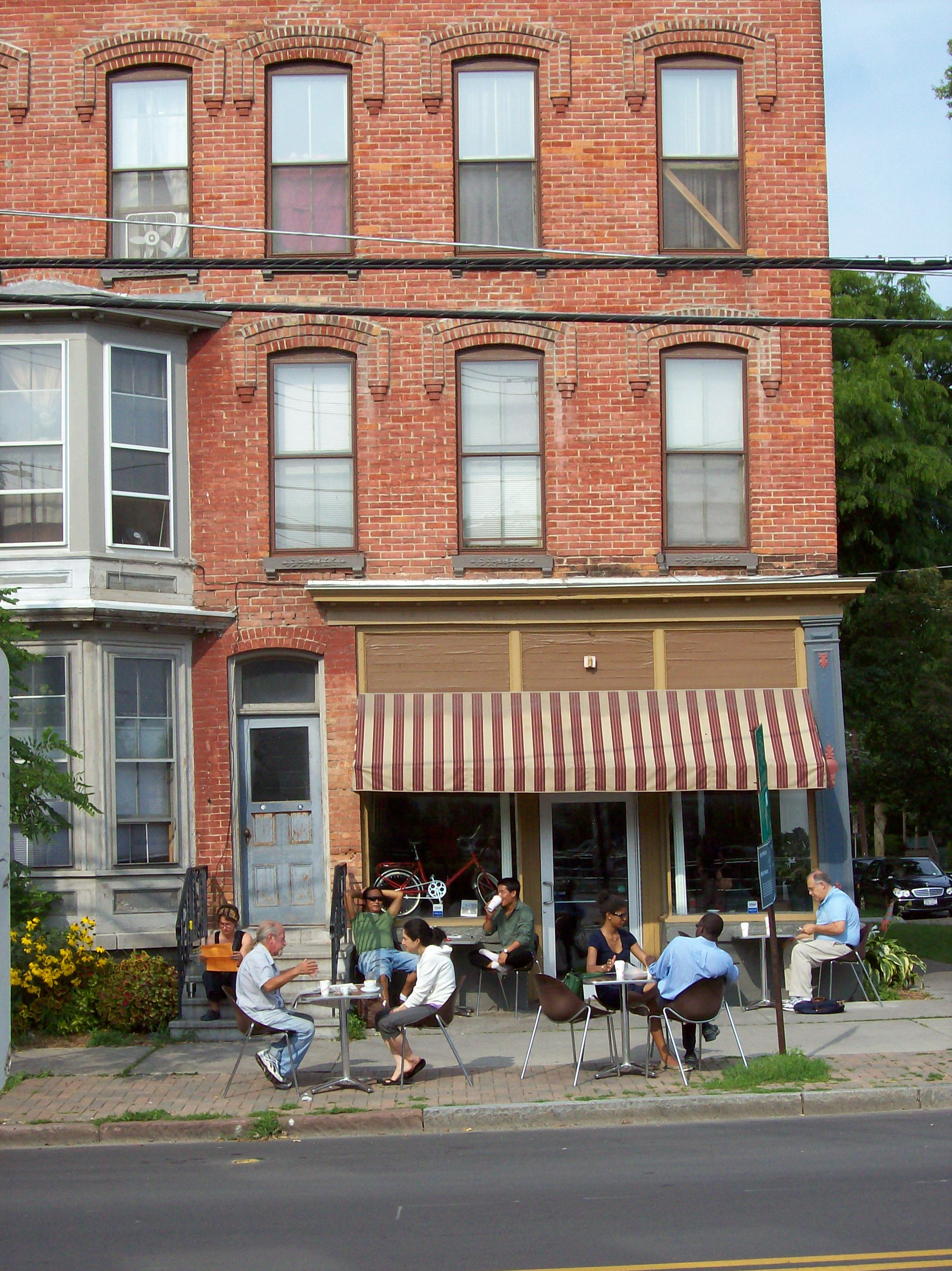
- The Gimme! Coffee bar on North Cayuga Street in Ithaca, New York, opened in 2000.
- Type: Private
- Founded: 2000
- Founder: Kevin Cuddeback
- Headquarters: Ithaca, New York
- Website: gimmecoffee.com

Gimme! Coffee is a coffee roaster and third-wave coffee shop, based in New York, US, with espresso bars in Ithaca and Trumansburg.

== History ==
Gimme! Coffee began as an espresso bar in 2000. It was located in Ithaca's Fall Creek neighborhood. A small-batch roastery opened the following year.

In response to the COVID-19 pandemic, Gimme! in 2020 closed the Manhattan and Brooklyn-based locations, and began an Ithaca-area delivery service. Gimme! Coffee also has a wholesale service that caters to coffee and espresso establishments. In January 2020, Colleen Anunu replaced founder Kevin Cuddeback as CEO after he had served 20 years in the role; Anunu then made the company into a worker-owned cooperative, which it remains in July 25, 2022. Gimme says that it forms relationships with farmers who grow coffee; farmers may receive a price premium which can help them improve their operations.

== Awards ==
In 2006, the New York Times named Gimme! Coffee among the best espresso bars in New York City. Gimme! Coffee received a Good Food Award, in the coffee category, for 2011 and 2012. Roast magazine chose Gimme! Coffee as winner of their 2013 Roaster of the Year contest (macro category). Dark Forest Chocolate collaborated with Gimme! Coffee to make an espresso based chocolate bar that won a Good Food Award in 2019.

== Unionization ==
In May 2017, the upstate New York Gimme employees formed a union through the Tompkins County Workers' Center. In February 2018, the group ratified its first union contract. In March 2021, the baristas voted to decertify their union, citing interpersonal challenges and unresolved issues with Workers United.

== College Partners ==
In August 2014, Gimme! opened an espresso bar in Gates Hall on Cornell University main campus. Subsequently, in 2017, an agreement was reached with Ithaca College to begin serving Gimme Coffee on campus.

== See also ==
- List of coffeehouse chains
