= The Angels of Light Sing 'Other People' =

2005 album

Studio album by Angels of Light
- Released: March 21, 2005
- Recorded: Fall 2004
- Studios: Seizure's Palace (Brooklyn, New York)
- Genre: Indie folk
- Length: 45:00
- Label: Young God
- Producer: Michael Gira

Angels of Light chronology
Everything Is Good Here/Please Come Home (2003)	The Angels of Light Sing 'Other People' (2005)	Akron / Family & Angels of Light (2005)

Professional ratings
Aggregate scores
Source	Rating
Metacritic	80/100
Review scores
Source	Rating
AllMusic	3.5/5 stars
Alternative Press	4/5 stars
Cokemachineglow	77%
Drowned in Sound	10/10
Mojo	4/5 stars
Pitchfork	7.7/10
PopMatters	8/10
Stylus	B+
Tiny Mix Tapes	3.5/5 stars
Uncut	7/10

The Angels of Light Sing 'Other People' is the fourth studio album by Angels of Light. Produced by band leader Michael Gira, it was released on March 21, 2005, via Gira's own record label, Young God Records. It is the band's first album to feature extensive contributions from American folk music outfit Akron/Family, who played on every song of the album.

== Critical reception ==
Upon its release, The Angels of Light Sing 'Other People' received positive reviews from music critics. At Metacritic, which assigns a normalized rating out of 100 to reviews from critics, the album received an average score of 80, which indicates "generally favorable reviews", based on 12 reviews. On the album, Greg Prato of Allmusic wrote: "Obviously, not what most Swans fans would expect from Gira, but in terms of a strong singer-songwriter album, Angels of Light Sing Other People is definitely a worthy listen. Mike Diver of Drowned in Sound gave the album a perfect 10 score and stated: "It is utterly engaging, totally absorbing and, well, absolutely essential." He also described the album as "a record rich in honesty, in true human emotions and wishes and woes." Sam Ubl of Pitchfork wrote: "Gira's songs have many one-of-a-kind nuances that tether the album even when it ventures," He also commented that "the album goes easy on the sexual anger, capitulating to a refreshingly mundane flavor of storytelling." Mike Powell of Stylus Magazine stated: "Sing ‘Other People’ leaves behind much of the violence of Gira's approach but retains the same soul-plunging ambitions, both allying him effortlessly with the druggy expressivity that characterizes practitioners of newer psychedelic music and belatedly identifying him as an influence and antecedent."

Some critics also noted the absence of drums from most of the recording, which was reported to be limited to "only 10 seconds".

== Track listing ==
No.	Title	Length
1.	"Lena's Song"	2:51
2.	"The Kid Is Already Breaking"	3:11
3.	"My Friend Thor"	2:05
4.	"On the Mountain"	5:15
5.	"Destroyer"	5:01
6.	"Dawn"	2:24
7.	"My Sister Said"	4:11
8.	"Michael's White Hands"	4:14
9.	"To Live Through Someone"	5:34
10.	"Simon Is Stronger Than Us"	1:34
11.	"Purple Creek"	4:34
12.	"Jackie's Spine"	4:07
Total length:		45:00

== Personnel ==
Angels of Light

- Michael Gira – vocals, production, arrangement, design, acoustic guitar, harmonica and various other instruments

Additional musicians

- Dana Janssen (Akron/Family) – drums, glockenspiel, bass guitar, electric guitar, percussion, piano, saxophone, synthesizer, vocals
- Seth Olinsky (Akron/Family) – banjo, Casio, acoustic guitar, electric guitar, organ, piano, synthesizer, vocals
- Miles Seaton (Akron/Family) – Casio, acoustic guitar, bass guitar, electric guitar, sounds, synthesizer, vocals
- Ryan Vanderhoof (Akron/Family) – Casio, acoustic guitar, electric guitar, slide guitar, synthesizer, vocals
- Paul Cantelon – violin
- Siobhan Duffy – vocals
- Patrick Fondiller – mandolin
- Jerome O'Brien – double bass
- Julia Kent – cello

Other personnel

- Bryce Goggin – mixing
- Doug Henderson – mastering
- Ben Kirkendoll – layout design, technical supervision, technician
- Jason LaFarge – audio engineering
