= Akron/Family (album) =

Studio album by Akron/Family
- Released: March 22, 2005
- Recorded: 2003–2004, Brooklyn
- Genre: Freak folk; psychedelic folk; lo-fi
- Length: 60:50
- Label: Young God Records
- Producer: Michael Gira and Akron/Family

Akron/Family chronology
Akron/Family (2005)	Angels of Light and Akron/Family (2005)

Professional ratings
Aggregate scores
Source	Rating
Metacritic	80/100
Review scores
Source	Rating
AllMusic	4/5 stars
Alternative Press	4/5 stars
Cokemachineglow	78%
Mojo	3.5/5 stars
Pitchfork	8.0/10
PopMatters	7/10
Stylus	A−
Tiny Mix Tapes	3.5/5 marks
Uncut	7/10

Akron/Family is the debut album by Akron/Family, released in 2005. The album was released on Young God Records on March 22 and was produced by the band with Michael Gira, head of the aforementioned record label.

The album is unusual for avoiding the band's more freeform elements. Seth from the group stated in an interview "I think when we made our first record, we had all these different sides to us as a band but we weren't going to release a double record. I think Michael encouraged us to focus on some of things we'd recorded at home, stuff which tended to be more quiet"

The track listing for the double vinyl version is slightly different from the CD version, with each format having 2 unique tracks.

== Track listing ==
CD version

1. "Before and Again" – 4:36
2. "Suchness" – 3:26
3. "Part of Corey" – 2:27
4. "Italy" – 8:08
5. "I'll Be on the Water" – 3:25
6. "Running, Returning" – 4:33
7. "Afford" – 3:57
8. "Interlude: Ak Ak Was the Boat They Sailed in On" – 2:31
9. "Sorrow Boy" – 3:43
10. "Shoes" – 3:42
11. "Lumen" – 5:30 – (CD exclusive)
12. "How Do I Know" – 2:30
13. "Franny/You're Human" – 5:58
14. "[Untitled]" – 6:24 – (CD exclusive)

Vinyl version

side a

1. "Before and Again" – 4:33
2. "Suchness" – 3:26
3. "Part of Corey" – 2:23
4. "Dylan Pt.1" – 4:20 – (vinyl exclusive)

side b

1. "Italy" – 8:08
2. "I'll Be on the Water" – 3:25
3. "Running, Returning" – 4:33

side c

1. "Afford" – 3:57
2. "Interlude: Ak Ak Was the Boat They Sailed in On" – 2:31
3. "Sorrow Boy" – 3:43
4. "Shoes" – 3:42

side d

1. "Positive Vibration Force" – 4:57 – (vinyl exclusive)
2. "How Do I Know" – 2:26
3. "Franny/You're Human" – 5:58
