= John Wesley Harding =

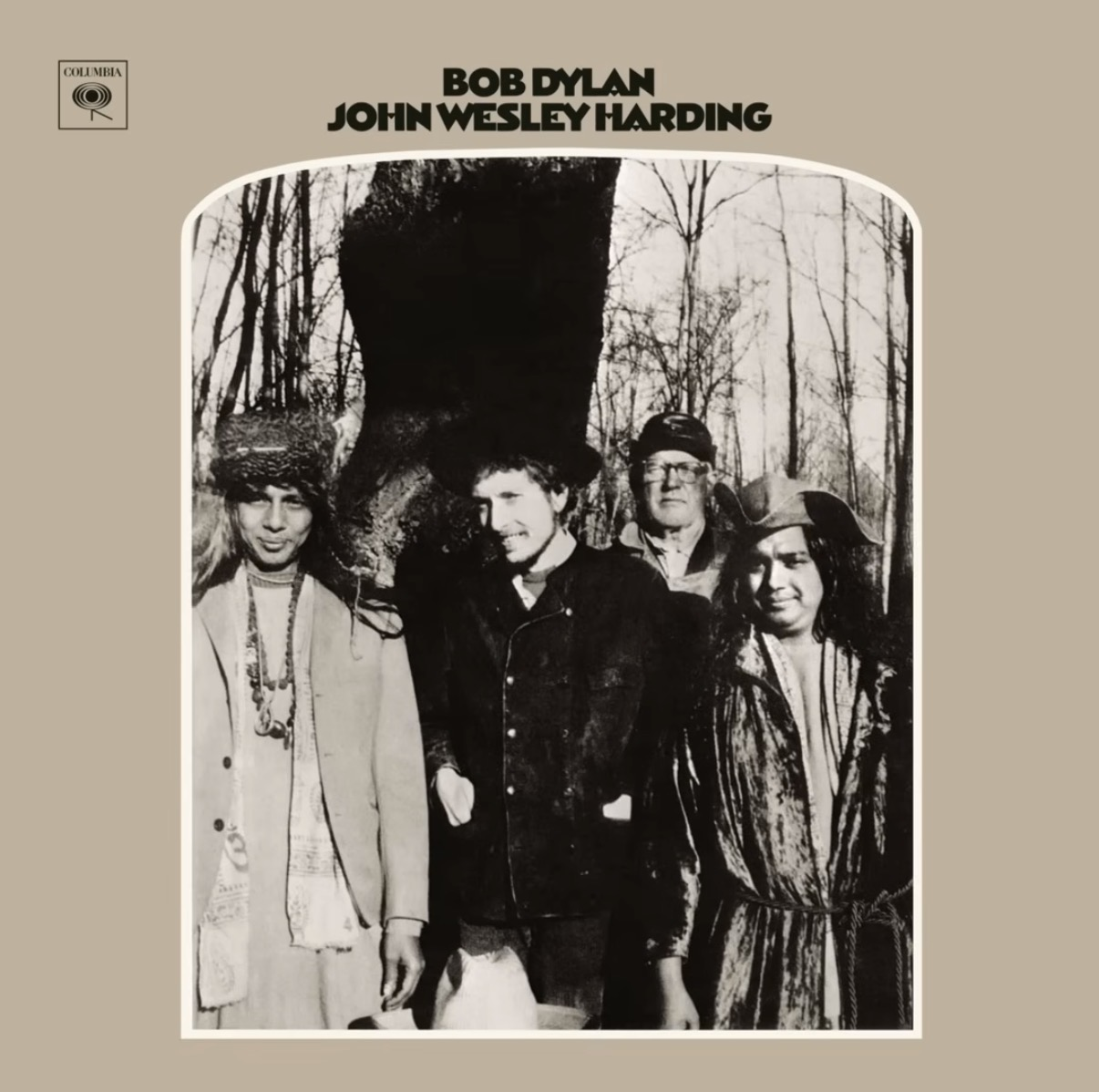

Studio album by Bob Dylan
- Released: December 27, 1967
- Recorded: October–November 1967
- Studios: Columbia Studio A (Nashville, Tennessee)
- Genres: Folk rock; country rock; roots rock
- Length: 38:24
- Label: Columbia
- Producer: Bob Johnston

Bob Dylan chronology
Bob Dylan's Greatest Hits (1967)	John Wesley Harding (1967)	Nashville Skyline (1969)

Bob Dylan studio album chronology
Blonde on Blonde (1966)	John Wesley Harding (1967)	Nashville Skyline (1969)

Singles from John Wesley Harding
- 1. "Drifter's Escape" Released: March 15, 1968 (Europe); 2. "All Along the Watchtower/I'll Be Your Baby Tonight" Released: November 22, 1968 (Germany/Netherlands)

John Wesley Harding is the eighth studio album by the American singer-songwriter Bob Dylan, released on December 27, 1967, by Columbia Records. Produced by Bob Johnston, the album marked Dylan's return to semi-acoustic instrumentation and folk-influenced songwriting after three albums of lyrically abstract, blues-indebted rock music. John Wesley Harding was recorded around the same time as the home recording sessions with the Band known as The Basement Tapes.

John Wesley Harding was well received by critics and sold well, reaching No. 2 on the U.S. charts and topping the UK charts. Less than three months after its release, John Wesley Harding was certified gold by the RIAA. "All Along the Watchtower" became one of his most popular songs after Jimi Hendrix's rendition was released in the autumn of 1968.

The album was included in Robert Christgau's "Basic Record Library" of 1950s and 1960s recordings, published in Christgau's Record Guide: Rock Albums of the Seventies (1981). In 2003, it was ranked number 301 on Rolling Stone magazine's list of the 500 greatest albums of all time, moving to 303 in the 2012 version of that list, then to 337 in the 2020 version. It was voted number 203 in the third edition of Colin Larkin's book All Time Top 1000 Albums (2000).

The album is named after Texas outlaw John Wesley Hardin, whose name was misspelled.

== Recording sessions ==
Dylan went to work on John Wesley Harding in the fall of 1967. By then, 18 months had passed since the completion of Blonde on Blonde. Dylan spent a substantial amount of time recording the informal basement sessions with the Band in West Saugerties, New York. During that time, he stockpiled a large number of recordings, including many new compositions. He eventually submitted nearly all of them for copyright, but declined to include any of them in his next studio release (Dylan would not release any of those recordings to the commercial market until 1975's The Basement Tapes, by which time some of them had been bootlegged, usually sourced from an easy-to-find set of publisher's demos). Instead, Dylan used a different set of songs for John Wesley Harding.

It is not known when these songs were actually written, but none of them have turned up in the dozens of basement recordings that have since surfaced. Robbie Robertson, the guitarist and principal songwriter of the Band, recalled that "it was just on a kind of whim that Bob went down to Nashville. And there, with just a couple of guys, he put those songs down on tape." Those sessions took place in the autumn of 1967, requiring less than twelve hours over three stints in the studio.

Dylan was once again recording with a band, but the instrumentation was very sparse. During most of the recording, the rhythm section of drummer Kenneth A. Buttrey and bassist Charlie McCoy were the only ones supporting Dylan, who handled all harmonica, guitar, piano, and vocal parts. "I didn't intentionally come out with some kind of mellow sound," Dylan said in 1971. "I would have liked… more steel guitar, more piano. More music… I didn't sit down and plan that sound."

The first session, held on October 17 at Columbia's Studio A, lasted only three hours, with Dylan recording master takes of "I Dreamed I Saw St. Augustine", "Drifter's Escape", and "The Ballad of Frankie Lee and Judas Priest". Dylan returned to the studio on November 6, recording master takes for "All Along the Watchtower", "John Wesley Harding", "As I Went Out One Morning", "I Pity the Poor Immigrant", and "I Am a Lonesome Hobo". Dylan returned for one last session on November 29, completing all of the remaining work.

Sometime between the second and third session, Dylan approached Robertson and keyboardist/saxophonist Garth Hudson to furnish overdubs on the basic tracks, but as Robertson recalled: "We did talk about doing some overdubbing on it, but I really liked it when I heard it and I couldn't really think right about overdubbing on it. So it ended up coming out the way he brought it back."

Dylan had arrived in Nashville with a set of songs similar to the feverish yet pithy compositions that came out of The Basement Tapes. They would be given an austere sound that he and his producer Bob Johnston thought sympathetic to their content. Johnston recalls that "he was staying in the Ramada Inn down there, and he played me his songs and he suggested we just use bass and guitar and drums on the record. I said fine, but also suggested we add a steel guitar, which is how Pete Drake came to be on that record." The final session did break from the status quo by employing Pete Drake on the final two recordings. Cut between 9pm and 12 midnight, "I'll Be Your Baby Tonight" and "Down Along the Cove" would be the only two songs featuring Drake's light pedal steel guitar.

John Wesley Harding was Dylan's last LP to be issued simultaneously in both monophonic (CL 2804) and stereophonic (CS 9604) formats. By the middle of the following year, most of Dylan's LPs would be released solely in stereophonic.

On November 1, 2019, Dylan released several new outtakes from this album and Nashville Skyline on The Bootleg Series, Vol. 15: Travelin' Thru 1967–1969.

== Packaging ==
The album is named after Texas outlaw John Wesley Hardin, whose name Dylan misspelled. Singer Wesley Stace, who used the stage name John Wesley Harding, said in a New York Times editorial that "no one knows why" Dylan misspelled Hardin's name in the title, and that to his knowledge, "no one’s ever bothered to ask". The cover photograph of John Wesley Harding shows a squinting Dylan flanked by brothers Luxman and Purna Das, two Bengali Bauls, Indian musicians brought to Woodstock by Dylan's manager, Albert Grossman. Behind Dylan is Charlie Joy, a local stonemason and carpenter.

Upon the album's release, rumors circulated that the faces of the Beatles were hidden on the front cover in the knots of the tree. When contacted by Rolling Stone magazine in 1968, album cover photographer John Berg "acknowledged their presence but was reluctant to talk about it." However, in a 1995 interview, Berg clarified that although the images seem to resemble the Beatles, this was not done intentionally, nor was he aware of the resemblance until it was pointed out to him after the album's release: "Later on, I got a call from Rolling Stone magazine in San Francisco. Someone had discovered little pictures of the Beatles and the hand of Jesus in the tree trunk. Well, I had a proof of the cover on my wall, so I went and turned it upside down and sure enough . . . Hahaha! I mean, if you wanted to see it, you could see it. I was as amazed as anybody."

The album sleeve is also notable for its liner notes, written by Dylan himself. The liner notes tells the story of three kings and three characters (Terry Shute, Frank, and Frank's wife, Vera) incorporating details from the album's songs.

== Release dates ==
Contradictory release dates have been claimed for John Wesley Harding. The liner notes to the Dylan mono box states December 17, 1967 as the original date of release. Reproduced in the liner notes to the eleventh volume of the Dylan Bootleg Series is an article by Al Aronowitz for The New York Times, date stamped December 23, 1967, in which he states that John Wesley Harding would be released "within the next two weeks". Original CD editions from the 1980s and 1990s have the copyright year of 1968. The January 20 issue of Billboard reported on the "blockbuster response" to the LP, saying: "In stores less than a week, the record is reported to have sold more than 250,000 copies." In his encyclopedia of all things Dylan, Michael Gray indicates a January 1968 release date for the LP.

In the February 3, 1968 issue of Melody Maker, the album was reviewed and announced for release in Britain on February 23. It first charted there on March 2, at number 25, before achieving a run of 13 weeks at number 1.

The album was re-released as one of the 15 Dylan titles remastered for Hybrid SACD on September 16, 2003, and was reissued again as part of The Original Mono Recordings on October 10, 2010.

== Legacy ==
Professional ratings
Review scores
Source	Rating
AllMusic	5/5 stars
The Encyclopedia of Popular Music	4/5 stars
The Great Rock Discography	6/10
MusicHound Rock	3.5/5
The Rolling Stone Album Guide	5/5 stars
Tom Hull	A

"I asked Columbia to release it with no publicity and no hype, because this was the season of hype," Dylan said. Clive Davis urged Dylan to pull a single, but even then Dylan refused, preferring to maintain the album's low-key profile.

In a year when psychedelia dominated popular culture, the agrarian-themed John Wesley Harding was seen as reactionary. Critic Jon Landau wrote in Crawdaddy! magazine, "For an album of this kind to be released amidst Sgt. Pepper, Their Satanic Majesties Request, After Bathing at Baxter's, somebody must have had a lot of confidence in what he was doing… Dylan seems to feel no need to respond to the predominate [sic] trends in pop music at all. And he is the only major pop artist about whom this can be said."

The critical stature of John Wesley Harding has continued to grow. As late as 2000, Clinton Heylin wrote, "John Wesley Harding remains one of Dylan's most enduring albums. Never had Dylan constructed an album-as-an-album so self-consciously. Not tempted to incorporate even later basement visions like 'Going to Acapulco' and 'Clothesline Saga,' Dylan managed in less than six weeks to construct his most perfectly executed official collection."

The album was remastered and re-released in 2003 using a new technology, SACD.

While legend has it that Dylan recorded John Wesley Harding after finishing The Basement Tapes sessions with members of the Band, several biographers and discographers have argued that the final reel of basement recordings actually postdates the first John Wesley Harding session.

Regardless of when this session actually occurred, the Band did accompany Dylan for at least one performance in the months following John Wesley Harding. After hearing of Woody Guthrie's passing (two weeks before John Wesley Harding's first session), Dylan contacted Harold Leventhal, Guthrie's longtime friend and manager, and extended an early acceptance to any invitation for any memorial show that might be planned. The memorial came on January 20, 1968, with a pair of shows at New York's Carnegie Hall. Sharing the bill with his folk contemporaries like Tom Paxton, Judy Collins, and Guthrie's son, Arlo, Dylan gave his first public performances in twenty months, backed by the Band (billed then as the Crackers). They played only three songs ("Grand Coulee Dam", "Dear Mrs. Roosevelt", and "I Ain't Got No Home"), and it would be another eighteen months before Dylan would again perform in concert.

As 1967 came to a close, Dylan's lifestyle became more stable. His wife, Sara, had given birth to their daughter, Anna, earlier that summer. He had reconciled with his estranged parents. A long contract negotiation ended in a lucrative new deal, allowing Dylan to stay with Columbia Records. While the media would never lose interest, Dylan maintained a low enough profile that kept him out of the spotlight.

After his appearance at Woody Guthrie's memorial concert, 1968 would see little, if any, musical activity from Bob Dylan. His songs continued to be a major presence, appearing on landmark albums by Jimi Hendrix, the Byrds, and the Band, but Dylan himself would not release or perform any additional music. There was very little songwriting activity, as well. "One day I was half-stepping, and the lights went out," Dylan would recall ten years later. "And since that point, I more or less had amnesia… It took me a long time to get to do consciously what I used to be able to do unconsciously." Around this time, there were significant changes in Dylan's private life: his father died from a heart attack, prompting Dylan to return to Hibbing to attend the funeral. Shortly afterwards, on July 30, 1968, Sara gave birth to their third child, Samuel Isaac Abram.

== Track listing ==
All tracks are written by Bob Dylan. The track durations cited here are those of the remastered version released September 16, 2003, and re-released June 1, 2004. Previous versions differ.

Side one
No.	Title	Recorded	Length
1.	"John Wesley Harding"	November 6, 1967	2:58
2.	"As I Went Out One Morning"	November 6, 1967	2:49
3.	"I Dreamed I Saw St. Augustine"	October 17, 1967	3:53
4.	"All Along the Watchtower"	November 6, 1967	2:31
5.	"The Ballad of Frankie Lee and Judas Priest"	October 17, 1967	5:35
6.	"Drifter's Escape"	October 17, 1967	2:52
Total length:			20:38

Side two
No.	Title	Recorded	Length
1.	"Dear Landlord"	November 29, 1967	3:16
2.	"I Am a Lonesome Hobo"	November 6, 1967	3:19
3.	"I Pity the Poor Immigrant"	November 6, 1967	4:12
4.	"The Wicked Messenger"	November 29, 1967	2:02
5.	"Down Along the Cove"	November 29, 1967	2:23
6.	"I'll Be Your Baby Tonight"	November 29, 1967	2:34
Total length:			17:46 38:24

== Personnel ==
- Bob Dylan – acoustic guitar, harmonica, piano, vocals

Additional musicians

- Kenneth A. Buttrey – drums
- Pete Drake – pedal steel guitar on "Down Along the Cove" and "I'll Be Your Baby Tonight"
- Charlie McCoy – bass guitar

Production and design

- John Berg – cover photo
- Charlie Bragg – engineering
- Bob Johnston – production

== Charts ==
=== Weekly charts ===
Year	Chart	Peak position
1968	Billboard Top LP's	2
1968	Cashbox Album Chart	2
1968	Record World Album Chart	1
1968	Spanish Albums Chart	7
1968	UK Albums Chart	1

== Certifications and sales ==
Region	Certification	Certified units/sales
United Kingdom (BPI) 1989 release	Gold	100,000^{^}
United States (RIAA)	Platinum	1,000,000^{^}
^{^} Shipments figures based on certification alone.

== Bibliography ==
- Dundas, Glen. Tangled Up in Tapes : a Recording History of Bob Dylan (Thunder Bay, Ontario: SMA Services, 1999 (4th ed.)) ISBN 0-9698569-2-X
- Gilliland, John (1969). "Hail, Hail, Rock 'n' Roll: Getting back to rock's funky, essential essence" (audio). Pop Chronicles. University of North Texas Libraries.
- Heylin, Clinton. Bob Dylan : The Recording Sessions, 1960-1994 (London: St. Martin's, 1995) ISBN 0-312-13439-8
