= As I Went Out One Morning =

Song by Bob Dylan

from the album John Wesley Harding
- Released: December 27, 1967
- Recorded: November 6, 1967
- Studio: Columbia Studio A (Nashville, Tennessee)
- Genre: Folk rock; country rock
- Length: 2:49
- Label: Columbia
- Songwriter: Bob Dylan
- Producer: Bob Johnston

"As I Went Out One Morning" is a song written and performed by American singer-songwriter Bob Dylan, released as the second song on his 1967 album John Wesley Harding.

== Lyrical interpretation and reception ==
"As I Went Out One Morning" is a narrative song about a man who offers a hand to a woman in chains, but realizes that she wants more than he is offering, and that "she meant to do [him] harm." A character identified as Tom Paine then appears, "command[s] her to yield," and apologizes to the narrator for the woman's actions.

"Tom Paine" as a figure may represent common sense or civil liberties, which the historical Tom Paine championed. However, it is also likely that this song references the prestigious Tom Paine Award that Dylan received in 1963 from the National Emergency Civil Liberties Committee. Dylan delivered an acceptance speech and was booed and rushed from the stage when he claimed to have empathy for some of Lee Harvey Oswald's feelings. This was followed by a letter from the ECLC and then a poem/letter from Dylan explaining his speech.

In their book Bob Dylan All the Songs: The Story Behind Every Track, authors Philippe Margotin and Jean-Michel Guesdon praise Dylan's vocal performance for "expressing a new maturity" not found in his earlier recordings and note that it is also "one of the first times he sings with vibrato".

The song bears a resemblance to, and is perhaps influenced by, the W. H. Auden poem As I Walked Out One Evening, including sharing the same iambic meter and quatrain form. The first line also bears resemblance to the folk song "Lolly Tudum", which begins "as I went out one morning to breathe the pleasant air", popularized in the New York folk scene by the Seeger Family.
