= I Am a Lonesome Hobo =

1967 song by Bob Dylan

Song by Bob Dylan

from the album John Wesley Harding
- Released: December 27, 1967
- Recorded: November 6, 1967
- Studio: Columbia Studio A (Nashville, Tennessee)
- Genre: Folk rock; country rock
- Length: 3:21
- Label: Columbia
- Songwriter(s): Bob Dylan
- Producer(s): Bob Johnston

"I Am a Lonesome Hobo" is a song written and recorded by Bob Dylan, released in 1967 on his eighth studio album, John Wesley Harding. The song was produced by Bob Johnston.

== Background and composition ==
In their book Bob Dylan All the Songs: The Story Behind Every Track, authors Philippe Margotin and Jean-Michel Guesdon observe that the hobo, "a vagabond or tramp, traveling by train throughout America and offering his services to farms to earn enough money to survive", was a "key figure in early 20th century American society", including in the works of Dylan's influences Woody Guthrie and Jack Kerouac. They point out how Dylan's song is narrated by such a character and that Dylan draws a parallel between this narrator and Cain (who killed his brother Abel) in the Book of Genesis. They also note that, musically, it is the "most blues-rock song on the album" even if Dylan is only playing an acoustic guitar. The version that appeared on the album is the fifth and final take.

== Critical reception ==
The original Rolling Stone review of John Wesley Harding from 1968 claimed that the song recalled Arthur Rimbaud's "miniature masterpiece My Bohemian Existence" and noted how Dylan "brilliantly...reverses the role of the Hobo and tells us what road one may end up on if one does not 'stay free from petty jealousies, live by no man's code', hold your judgment for yourself and keep cool".

Dylan scholar Tony Attwood sees the song as "fitting neatly alongside 'Drifter's Escape', representing the other side of the coin of the outcast in American society". Whereas the narrator of "Drifter's Escape" is an honest man who "steals only in desperation", the narrator of "I Am a Lonesome Hobo" is a man whose "past success and well-being financially...has corrupted him".

Jochen Markhorst calls it a song of "simple beauty" but also "a neglected child" since Dylan never played the song again after recording it for John Wesley Harding. Markhorst also notes that, "To compensate: almost every cover is very attractive".

In a 2021 essay, Greil Marcus mentions the song as an exemplary blues from Dylan, citing it as his first example of Dylan's version of "the chair" (after a metaphor John Lennon had used in a Rolling Stone interview: "[The blues] is not a concept. It is a chair, not a design for a chair...it's chairs for sitting on, not chairs for looking at or being appreciated. You sit on that music."). Marcus also notes the song has origins in "Poor Boy, Long Way from Home and a hundred other blues and folk songs".

== Notable covers ==
There have been at least a half dozen notable covers of "I am a Lonesome Hobo".

- Brian Auger Trinity and Julie Driscoll released a cover as a single in 1968
- Thea Gilmore for her tribute project John Wesley Harding in 2011
- Duke Robillard on his album Ear Worms in 2019
- The Triffids on their debut album Treeless Plain in 1983
- Jazz musician Jef Lee Johnson on his 2009 album The Zimmerman Shadow
- Mikael Wiehe who translated it into Swedish (as "Jag är en fattig stackare") for the 2006 Dylan by Totta & Wiehe tribute album
