= The Bootleg Series Vol. 10: Another Self Portrait (1969–1971) =

Compilation album by Bob Dylan
- Released: August 27, 2013
- Recorded: February 13, 1969 – November 4, 1971 (Note: "Minstrel Boy" recorded in 1967)
- Studio: Columbia, New York City
- Genre: Folk; rock; country
- Length: 113:27
- Label: Columbia
- Producer: Bob Johnston

Bob Dylan chronology
The 50th Anniversary Collection (2012)	The Bootleg Series Vol. 10: Another Self Portrait (1969–1971) (2013)	The Complete Album Collection Vol. One (2013)

Bob Dylan Bootleg Series chronology
Vol. 9: The Witmark Demos: 1962–1964 (2010)	Vol. 10: Another Self Portrait (1969–1971) (2013)	Vol. 11: The Basement Tapes Complete (2014)

Singles from The Bootleg Series Vol. 10: Another Self Portrait (1969–1971)
- 1. "Wigwam" / "Thirsty Boots" Released: April 20, 2013; 2. "Pretty Saro" Released: August 13, 2013

The Bootleg Series Vol. 10: Another Self Portrait (1969–1971) is a compilation album by American singer-songwriter Bob Dylan, released on August 27, 2013 on Legacy Records. The eighth installment of the ongoing Bob Dylan Bootleg Series, it consists of unreleased recordings, demo recordings, alternative takes mostly from Dylan's 1970 albums Self Portrait and New Morning, and two live tracks from the 1969 Isle of Wight Festival.

The cover is new artwork by Dylan. The liner notes have been written by Greil Marcus, who wrote the original Self Portrait review for Rolling Stone that infamously asked, "What is this shit?". Also included is an extensive essay from journalist Michael Simmons. The set also contains rare photographs of that era from John Cohen and Al Clayton.

== Background ==
The Bootleg Series Vol. 10 – Another Self Portrait (1969–1971) "reveals fresh aspects of Dylan's vocal genius as he reimagines traditional and contemporary folk music as well as songs of his own. Across these unvarnished performances, Dylan is the country singer from Nashville Skyline ("Country Pie" and "I Threw It All Away"), an interpreter of traditional folk ("Little Sadie," "Pretty Saro") who's right at home singing the songs of his contemporaries (Tom Paxton's "Annie's Gonna Sing Her Song" and Eric Andersen's "Thirsty Boots") before returning to writing and singing his own new music ("Went to See the Gypsy," "Sign on the Window")".

== Promotion ==
The first songs released from The Bootleg Series Vol. 10 – Another Self Portrait (1969–1971) were an unreleased demo of "Wigwam" backed with a previously unreleased recording of "Thirsty Boots" on 7" vinyl for Record Store Day 2013. On August 8, 2013, a video for the song "Pretty Saro," a traditional English ballad, was released. The video featured photos taken from the Farm Security Administration archive at the Library of Congress. A week later, the song was released as a download single.

== Editions ==
The Bootleg Series Vol. 10: Another Self Portrait (1969–1971) is available in a standard two-disc configuration as well as in a four-disc deluxe boxed set which includes, for the first time, the complete historic performance by Bob Dylan and the Band from the Isle of Wight Festival on Sunday, August 31, 1969 (though incorrectly dated August 30, 1969 in the album notes accompanying the set). Housed in a slipcase, the deluxe edition includes a newly remastered version of the 1970 Self Portrait album, in its entirety with original sequencing, in addition to two hardcover books featuring revisionist liner notes penned by Greil Marcus (author of the notorious "What is this shit?" 1970 Self Portrait review in Rolling Stone). A vinyl version of The Bootleg Series Vol. 10: Another Self Portrait (1969–1971) includes the album's 35 tracks on three LPs plus a 12" × 12" booklet.

== Critical reception ==
Professional ratings
Aggregate scores
Source	Rating
Metacritic	81/100
Review scores
Source	Rating
AllMusic	4/5 stars
American Songwriter	4/5 stars
Consequence of Sound	3.5/5 stars
Guitar World	Positive
Pitchfork Media	8.7/10
Rolling Stone	4.5/5 stars
Tom Hull	B

In his review for AllMusic, Thom Jurek gave the album four out of five stars, calling it "an indispensable addition to the catalog". While he believes that Dylan made the right choices on the original New Morning album, these outtakes and alternate takes are still interesting.

In his review for American Songwriter, Jim Beviglia gave the album four out of five stars. Beviglia wrote:

What this collection attempts to do is rectify the errors, in production and song selection, made when the albums were first released. In the case of Self Portrait, overdubs added after the fact in '70 have been eliminated, removing the filter between the listener and Dylan's raw, affecting performances of "Copper Kettle" and "Days Of '49."

In his review on the Consequence of Sound website, Mike Madden gave the album three and a half out of five stars, writing that Another Self Portrait is "highlighted by songs we've heard before but presented here in different versions, such as the cozy lament 'I Threw It All Away'". Despite some "bottom-of-the-barrel" material, Madden noted the "pleasing discoveries" presented on the album:

'I contemplated every move, or at least I tried,' Dylan sings on 'Went to See the Gypsy'. Elsewhere, Another Self Portrait indicates that while he had trouble with his writing mechanics around this time, it wasn't for lack of trying. 'Sign on the Window' is home to orchestral arrangements that could have been on George Harrison's All Things Must Pass, while Abbey Road dynamics power the second alternate version of 'Time Passes Slowly'. These, as well as the rockabilly of 'Working on a Guru' and the Nashville classicism of 'Tattle O'Day', are moderate successes, but they reveal that Dylan did in fact have the motivation to flesh out new directions for himself during these years. Let's be grateful that this set exists, if only because it begins to clears up a mythical period of the now 72-year-old Dylan’s frequently inscrutable oeuvre.

In his review in Guitar World, Jeff Slate wrote that the "thing about being a fan of Bob Dylan is that the discovery of his greatness is never-ending". Slate went on to observe, "Dylan sounds great, the songs and performances are peerless, and though stylistically Another Self Portrait is a bit all over the place (owing mostly to the fact that the sessions the material is culled from spans three years) it also is remarkably coherent." Slate concluded that "the thing that struck me in reflecting on this entry in the series and the nine volumes that came before it—not to mention Dylan's official studio output—was the consistency of Dylan's output. It's all great. Seriously."

In his review for Rolling Stone magazine, David Fricke gave the album four and a half out of five stars, calling it "one of the most important, coherent and fulfilling Bob Dylan albums ever released". Fricke found the performances to be "immediate and invigorating", with Dylan delivering "virile singing". Fricke continued:

Despite the vintage, or maybe because it's all been hidden for so long, everything here feels like new music, busy being born and put to tape with crisp impatience. 'Let's just take this one,' Dylan says before a take of the traditional ballad "Little Sadie," one of 17 raw, magnetic tracks from a single three-day sprint with guitarist David Bromberg and pianist Al Kooper in March 1970. Dylan was, in fact, on the verge of a crossroads: the widely scorned double LP Self Portrait, issued three months later. He sounds eager to get there. That album is still tough going: a frank, confrontational likeness of the artist at 29 and loose ends, crooning folk tunes, pure corn and odd, plaintive originals, mostly through thick Nashville syrup. There may be no better description of Dylan at the close of his first, whirlwind decade, exhausted and uncertain of his way into the next, than Self Portrait's opening mantra, sung in his place by a group of country-gospel angels: "All the tired horses in the sun/How'm I supposed to get any ridin' done?"

Fricke believed that Self Portrait and New Morning were part of a "long, connected act of self-examination and re-ignition". This latest addition to the Bootleg series highlights "Dylan's breadth of drive at a time when many thought he had no direction forward".

== Track listing ==
All tracks are written by Bob Dylan, except where noted; traditional songs arranged by Bob Dylan.

Disc one
No.	Title	Writer(s)	Recorded	Length
1.	"Went to See the Gypsy" (demo)		March 3, 1970	3:01
2.	"Little Sadie" (without overdubs, Self Portrait)	Traditional	March 3, 1970	2:02
3.	"Pretty Saro" (unreleased, Self Portrait)	Traditional	March 3, 1970	2:16
4.	"Alberta #3" (alternate version, Self Portrait)	Traditional	March 5, 1970	2:37
5.	"Spanish is the Loving Tongue" (unreleased, Self Portrait)	Charles Badger Clark	June 2, 1970	3:51
6.	"Annie's Going to Sing Her Song" (unreleased, Self Portrait)	Tom Paxton	March 4, 1970	2:22
7.	"Time Passes Slowly #1" (alternate version, New Morning)		May 1, 1970	2:18
8.	"Only a Hobo" (unreleased, Bob Dylan's Greatest Hits Vol. II)		September 1, 1971	3:25
9.	"Minstrel Boy" (unreleased, The Basement Tapes)		1967	1:39
10.	"I Threw It All Away" (alternate version, Nashville Skyline)		February 16, 1969	2:25
11.	"Railroad Bill" (unreleased, Self Portrait)	Traditional	March 4, 1970	2:44
12.	"Thirsty Boots" (unreleased, Self Portrait)	Eric Andersen	March 4, 1970	4:06
13.	"This Evening So Soon" (unreleased, Self Portrait)	Traditional	March 4, 1970	4:49
14.	"These Hands" (unreleased, Self Portrait)	Eddie Noack	March 3, 1970	3:43
15.	"In Search of Little Sadie" (without overdubs, Self Portrait)	Traditional	March 3, 1970	2:26
16.	"House Carpenter" (unreleased, Self Portrait)	Traditional	March 4, 1970	5:59
17.	"All the Tired Horses" (without overdubs, Self Portrait)		March 5, 1970	1:15
Total length:				51:15

Disc two
No.	Title	Writer(s)	Recorded	Length
1.	"If Not for You" (alternate version, New Morning)		June 2, 1970	2:29
2.	"Wallflower" (alternate version, 1971)		November 4, 1971	2:18
3.	"Wigwam" (without overdubs, Self Portrait)		March 4, 1970	3:10
4.	"Days of '49" (without overdubs, Self Portrait)	Traditional	March 4, 1970	5:13
5.	"Working on a Guru" (unreleased, New Morning)		May 1, 1970	3:43
6.	"Country Pie" (alternate version, Nashville Skyline)		February 14, 1969	1:27
7.	"I'll Be Your Baby Tonight" (live with The Band, Isle of Wight, 1969)		August 31, 1969	3:31
8.	"Highway 61 Revisited" (live with The Band, Isle of Wight, 1969)		August 31, 1969	3:39
9.	"Copper Kettle" (without overdubs, Self Portrait)	Albert Frank Beddoe	March 3, 1970	3:35
10.	"Bring Me a Little Water" (unreleased, New Morning)	Traditional	June 4, 1970	3:58
11.	"Sign on the Window" (with orchestral overdubs, New Morning)		June 5, 1970	3:51
12.	"Tattle O'Day" (unreleased, Self Portrait)	Traditional	March 4, 1970	3:49
13.	"If Dogs Run Free" (alternate version, New Morning)		June 5, 1970	4:10
14.	"New Morning" (with horn section overdubs, New Morning)		June 4, 1970	4:04
15.	"Went to See the Gypsy" (alternate version, New Morning)		June 5, 1970	3:33
16.	"Belle Isle" (without overdubs, Self Portrait)	Traditional	March 3, 1970	2:35
17.	"Time Passes Slowly #2" (alternate version, New Morning)		June 2, 1970	3:02
18.	"When I Paint My Masterpiece" (demo)		March 19, 1971	3:53
Total length:				62:12

=== Deluxe Edition ===
Disc three (Live at the Isle of Wight Festival, 8/31/1969)
No.	Title	Writer(s)	Length
1.	"Intro"		0:40
2.	"She Belongs to Me"		3:01
3.	"I Threw It All Away"		3:07
4.	"Maggie's Farm"		4:00
5.	"Wild Mountain Thyme"	Traditional	2:51
6.	"It Ain't Me Babe"		3:09
7.	"To Ramona"		2:25
8.	"Mr. Tambourine Man"		3:08
9.	"I Dreamed I Saw St. Augustine"		3:32
10.	"Lay Lady Lay"		3:54
11.	"Highway 61 Revisited"		3:47
12.	"One Too Many Mornings"		2:38
13.	"I Pity the Poor Immigrant"		3:47
14.	"Like a Rolling Stone"		5:25
15.	"I'll Be Your Baby Tonight"		3:30
16.	"Quinn the Eskimo (The Mighty Quinn)"		2:49
17.	"Minstrel Boy"		3:48
18.	"Rainy Day Women #12 & 35"		3:17
Total length:			60:41

Disc four (Self Portrait Remastered)
No.	Title	Writer(s)	Length
1.	"All the Tired Horses"		3:12
2.	"Alberta #1"	Traditional	2:57
3.	"I Forgot More Than You'll Ever Know"	Cecil Allen Null	2:23
4.	"Days of '49"	Alan Lomax, John Lomax, Frank Warner	5:27
5.	"Early Mornin' Rain"	Gordon Lightfoot	3:34
6.	"In Search of Little Sadie"	Traditional	2:28
7.	"Let It Be Me"	Gilbert Bécaud, Mann Curtis, Pierre Delanoë	3:00
8.	"Little Sadie"	Traditional	2:00
9.	"Woogie Boogie"		2:06
10.	"Belle Isle"	Traditional	2:30
11.	"Living the Blues"		2:42
12.	"Like a Rolling Stone" (Live at the Isle of Wight Festival, 8/31/69)		5:18
13.	"Copper Kettle"	Albert Frank Beddoe	3:34
14.	"Gotta Travel On"	Paul Clayton, Larry Ehrlich, David Lazar, Tom Six	3:08
15.	"Blue Moon"	Richard Rodgers, Lorenz Hart	2:29
16.	"The Boxer"	Paul Simon	2:48
17.	"The Mighty Quinn (Quinn the Eskimo)" (Live at the Isle of Wight Festival, 8/31/69)		2:48
18.	"Take Me as I Am (Or Let Me Go)"	Boudleaux Bryant	3:03
19.	"Take a Message to Mary"	Felice Bryant, Boudleaux Bryant	2:46
20.	"It Hurts Me Too"	Traditional	3:15
21.	"Minstrel Boy" (Live at the Isle of Wight Festival, 8/31/69)		3:33
22.	"She Belongs to Me" (Live at the Isle of Wight Festival, 8/31/69)		2:44
23.	"Wigwam"		3:09
24.	"Alberta #2"	Traditional	3:12
Total length:			73:15

== Charts ==
=== Weekly charts ===
Chart (2013)	Peak position
Australian Albums (ARIA)	20
Austrian Albums (Ö3 Austria)	5
Belgian Albums (Ultratop Flanders)	3
Belgian Albums (Ultratop Wallonia)	29
Danish Albums (Hitlisten)	2
Dutch Albums (Album Top 100)	2
Finnish Albums (Suomen virallinen lista)	22
French Albums (SNEP)	41
German Albums (Offizielle Top 100)	2
Irish Albums (IRMA)	5
Italian Albums (FIMI)	24
New Zealand Albums (RMNZ)	16
Norwegian Albums (VG-lista)	3
Scottish Albums (Official Charts)	4
Spanish Albums (Promusicae)	10
Swedish Albums (Sverigetopplistan)	1
Swiss Albums (Schweizer Hitparade)	6
UK Albums (Official Charts)	5
US Billboard 200	21
US Billboard 200 Deluxe Edition	60
US Top Rock Albums (Billboard)	5
US Top Rock Albums (Billboard) Deluxe Edition	17

=== Year-end charts ===
Chart (2013)	Position
Belgian Albums (Ultratop Flanders)	163

== Personnel ==
Music

- Bob Dylan – guitar, harmonica, piano (tr. 5), electric piano, vocals
- Norman Blake – guitar (tr. 10)
- David Bromberg – dobro (tr. 4), guitar (tr. 1 - 3, 6, 11)
- Kenny Buttrey – drums (tr. 10)
- Ron Cornelius – guitar
- Charlie Daniels – bass (tr.7), guitar (tr. 10)
- Rick Danko – bass, vocals (tr. 9)
- Peter Drake – steel guitar
- Hilda Harris – background vocals
- George Harrison – guitar, vocals (tr.7)
- Levon Helm – drums, vocals (tr. 9)
- Kelton Herston – guitar (tr. 10)
- Garth Hudson – keyboards (tr. 9)
- Ben Keith – steel guitar
- Al Kooper – organ, piano (tr. 4, 6, 11)
- Russ Kunkel – drums (tr.7)
- Richard Manuel – piano, vocals (tr. 9)
- Charlie McCoy – bass (tr. 10)
- Robbie Robertson – guitar (tr. 9)
- Albertine Robinson – background vocals
- Alvin Rogers – drums (tr. 4)
- Maeretha Stewart – background vocals
- Happy Traum – banjo, background vocals (tr. 8)
- Bob Wilson – piano
- Stu Woods – bass (tr. 4)

Production

- Bob Johnston – producer
- Al Kooper – horn arrangements, mixing, producer, string arrangements
- Bob Dylan – arranger, cover art
- Steve Addabbo – mixing
- Steve Berkowitz – mixing
- Greg Calbi – mastering
- Charles Calello – horn arrangements, string arrangements
- Matt Cavaluzzo – tape transfer
- Josh Cheuse – photography
- Al Clayton – photography
- John Cohen – photography
- Arie De Reus – photo courtesy, research
- Geoff Gans – art direction, design
- Callie Gladman – production collaborator
- Patrice Habans – photography
- April Hayes – production collaborator
- Magne Karlstad – research
- Glenn Korman – research
- Elliot Landy – photography
- Diane Lapsonv – production collaborator
- Bryan Lasley – design
- Greg Linn – product manager
- Greil Marcus – liner notes
- Paris Match – photography
- David Redfern – photography
- Dave Roberts – mixing
- Jeff Rosen – compiled
- Oddbjorn Saltnes – research
- Will Schwartz – production collaborator
- Michael Simmons – liner notes
- Debbie Sweeney – production collaborator
