= Isle of Wight Festival 1969 =

Music festival

- Official festival poster
- Genre: Rock, folk, country, blues, jazz
- Dates: 29–31 August 1969
- Locations: Woodside Bay, Wootton Creek, Isle of Wight, England
- Coordinates: 50.735°N 1.230°W
- Founders: Rikki Farr, Ronnie Foulk, Ray Foulk

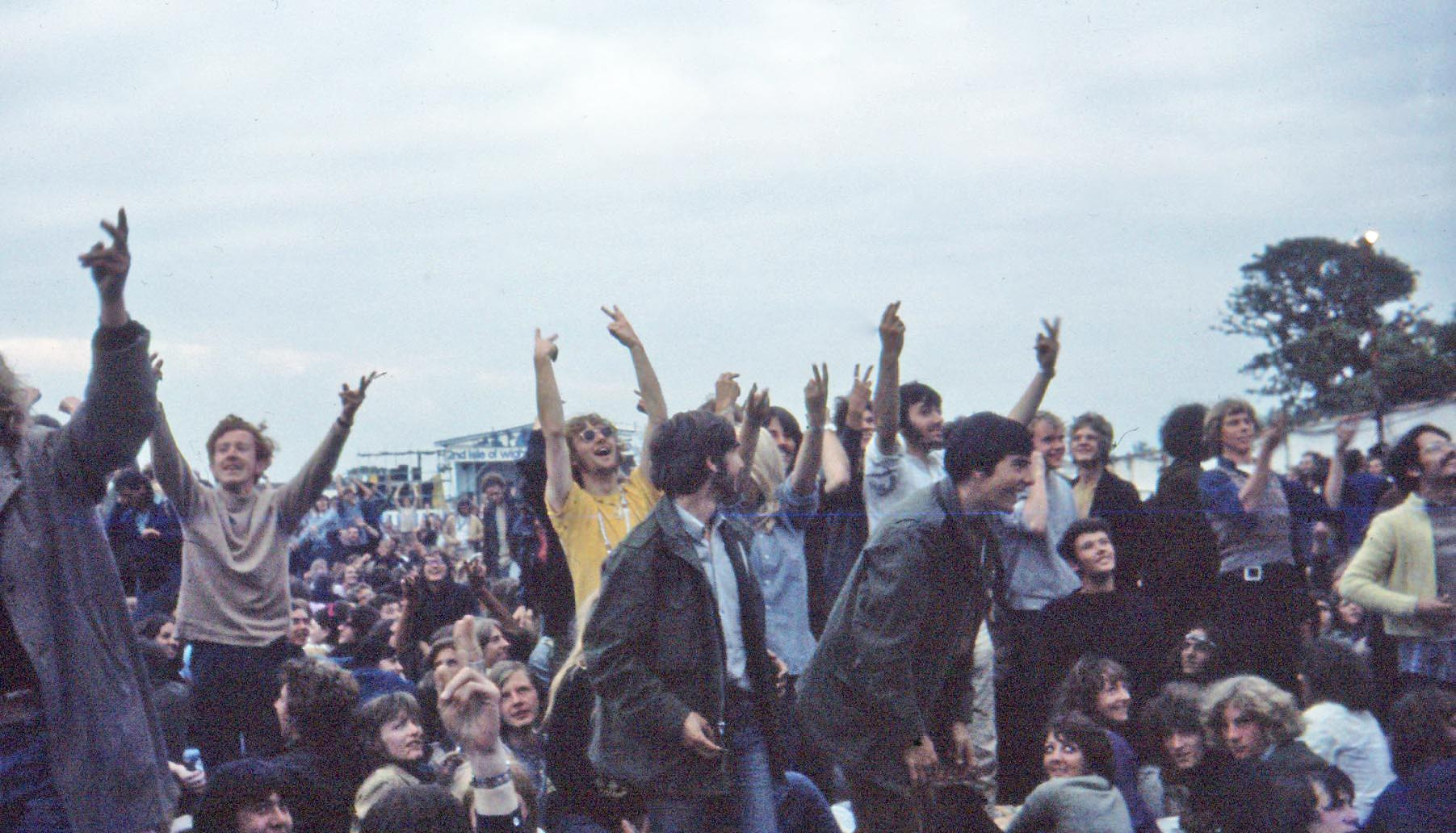
Isle of Wight Festival 1969

The 1969 Isle of Wight Festival was held on 29–31 August 1969 at Wootton Creek, on the Isle of Wight, England. The festival attracted an audience of approximately 150,000 to see acts including Bob Dylan, the Band, the Who, Free, Joe Cocker, and the Bonzo Dog Band. It was the second of three music festivals held on the island from 1968 to 1970. Organised by Rikki Farr, Ronnie and Ray Foulk's Fiery Creations, it became a legendary event, largely owing to the participation of Dylan, who had spent the previous three years in semi-retirement. The event was well managed, in comparison to the recent Woodstock Festival, and trouble-free.

In August 2026, the 1969 and 1970 festivals were the subject of BBC Radio 4's The Reunion, featuring in conversation Justin Hayward of The Moody Blues, Jacqui McShee of Pentangle, and Ian Anderson of Jethro Tull. Also in the programme were Melody Maker writer Richard Williams, island resident Terrii Telfer, and two of the Foulk brothers who organised the event.

== Bob Dylan ==
The 1969 festival was considerably larger and more popular than the previous year's. Dylan had been little heard of since his allegedly near-fatal motorcycle accident in July 1966. Shunning the Woodstock Festival, held near his home in upstate New York, Dylan was initially reluctant to perform his comeback show on the little-known Isle of Wight. After weeks of negotiations, the Foulk brothers showed him a short film of the island's cultural and literary heritage; this appealed to Dylan's artistic sensibilities, as he was enthusiastic about combining a family holiday with a live performance in Tennyson country. The family was scheduled to travel to Britain on the Queen Elizabeth 2 and nearly missed the gig because Dylan's son Jesse had been hit by a ship cabin door and needed to be hospitalised. Dylan travelled to the site by plane at the last minute.

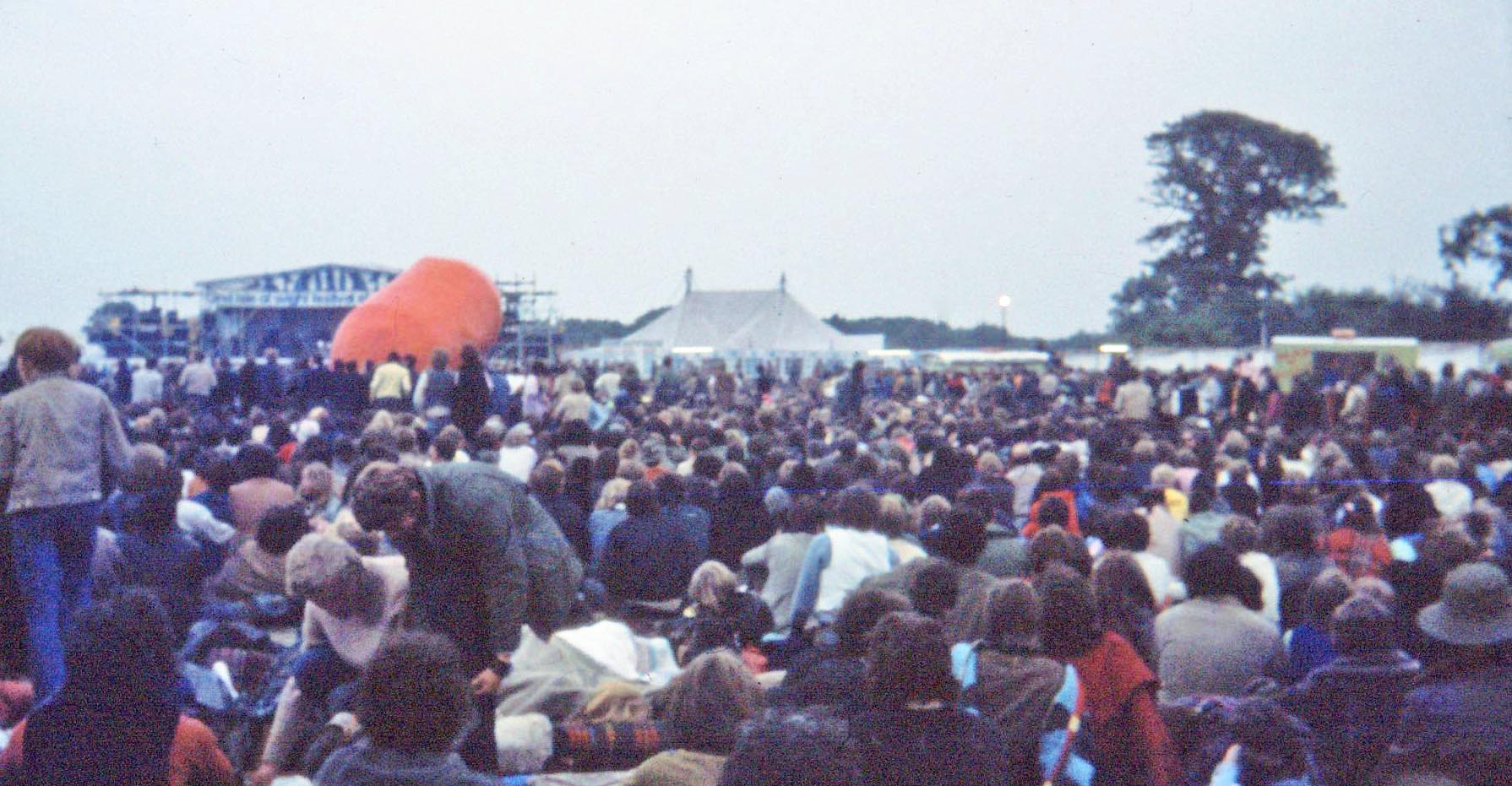
The crowd in front the main stage

Before the festival, Dylan and his fellow Woodstock residents, the Band, rehearsed at Forelands Farm in Bembridge, and were joined there by George Harrison, the only "outsider" to have visited him in his enclave in the Catskill Mountains. On Saturday, 30 August, the day before Dylan was to take the stage, Harrison's fellow Beatles John Lennon and Ringo Starr arrived on the island, along with Keith Richards of the Rolling Stones, and Eric Clapton. Also seated in the sealed-off VIP area in front of the stage would be Beatle wives Pattie Harrison, Yoko Ono and Maureen Starkey, together with celebrities such as Jane Fonda, Françoise Hardy, Georges Moustaki, Syd Barrett, Donald Cammell, Elton John, the Moody Blues and others.

Thanks to rumours that one or all of the Beatles would be joining him on stage, Dylan's comeback show had become, in the words of music journalist John Harris, "inflated into the gig of the decade". On 31 August, Dylan arrived on stage in a cream suit recalling Hank Williams. Backed by the Band, he performed recent pieces from his Nashville Skyline and John Wesley Harding albums, as well as countryfied versions of earlier songs such as "Maggie's Farm", "Highway 61 Revisited" and "Like a Rolling Stone".

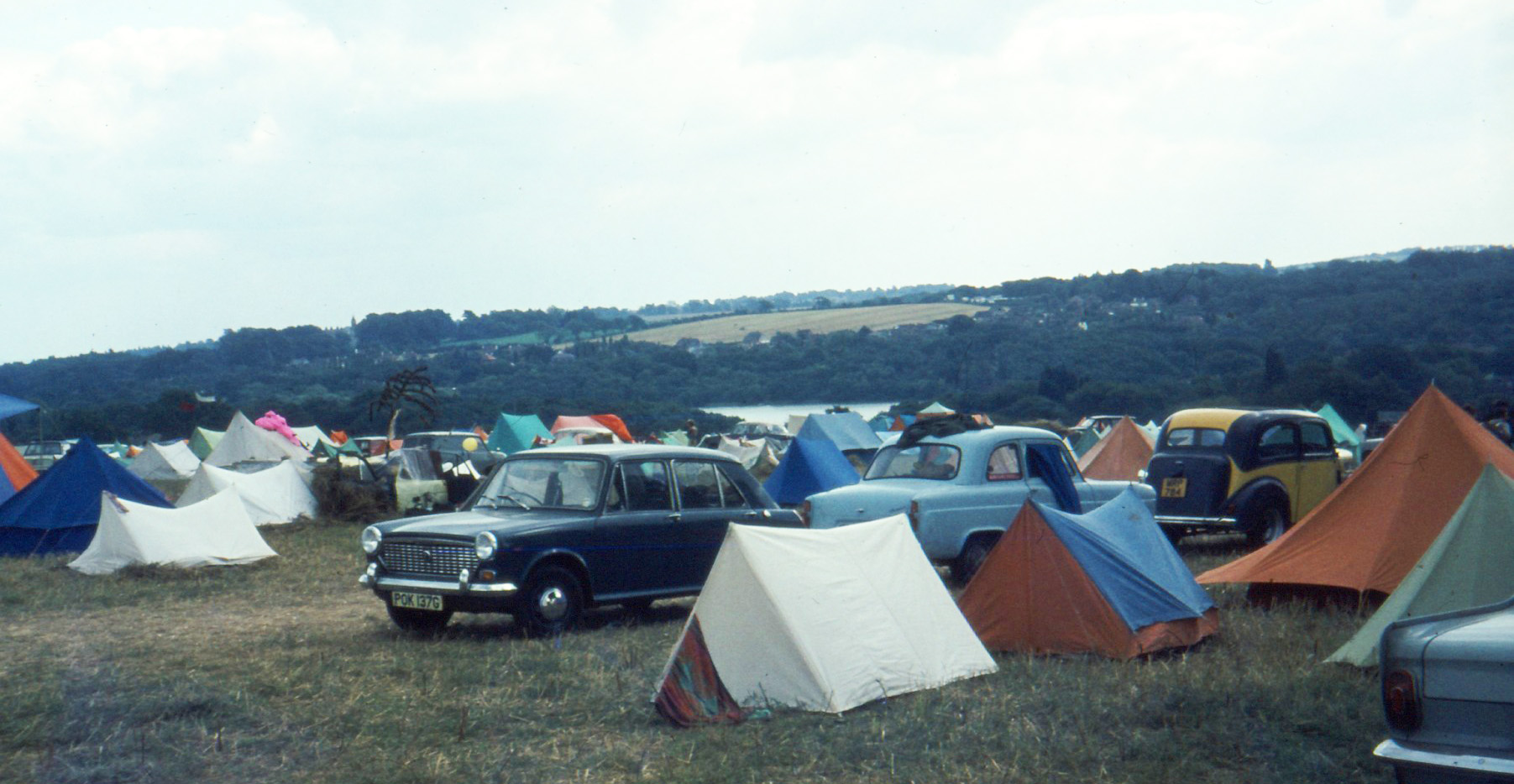
Tents at the festival

Dylan's setlist was as follows:

1. "She Belongs to Me"
2. "I Threw It All Away"
3. "Maggie's Farm"
4. "Wild Mountain Thyme"
5. "It Ain't Me, Babe"
6. "To Ramona"
7. "Mr. Tambourine Man"
8. "I Dreamed I Saw St. Augustine"
9. "Lay, Lady, Lay"
10. "Highway 61 Revisited"
11. "One Too Many Mornings"
12. "I Pity the Poor Immigrant"
13. "Like a Rolling Stone"
14. "I'll Be Your Baby Tonight"
15. "The Mighty Quinn (Quinn the Eskimo)"
16. "Minstrel Boy"
17. "Rainy Day Women #12 & 35"

Four performances from this concert were included on Dylan's album Self Portrait (1970): "Like a Rolling Stone", "The Mighty Quinn (Quinn the Eskimo)", "Minstrel Boy" and "She Belongs to Me". His set with the Band was also released in several countries on various bootleg records.

A champion of both the Band and Dylan, Harrison wrote a country song inspired by the event and dedicated to Dylan, "Behind That Locked Door", released on his 1970 triple album All Things Must Pass.

In 2013, the complete recording of Dylan's performance was released on the Deluxe Edition of The Bootleg Series Vol. 10: Another Self Portrait (1969–1971).

== The Who ==
The Who presented their standard set at that time, which included the rock opera Tommy, as they had recently released that album and were touring in support of it. The group had just returned from a tour of the United States, where they had performed at Woodstock about two weeks earlier. They opened with "Heaven and Hell", followed by "I Can't Explain", "Fortune Teller", "Young Man Blues", and then performed the opera nearly in full, finishing up with "Summertime Blues", "Shakin' All Over"/"Spoonful" and two tracks as the encore: "My Generation" and the finale of "Naked Eye".

== Line-up ==
(alphabetical order)

- The Band
- Battered Ornaments
- Blodwyn Pig
- Blonde on Blonde
- Bonzo Dog Doo-Dah Band
- Edgar Broughton Band
- Joe Cocker
- Aynsley Dunbar Retaliation
- Bob Dylan
- Eclection
- Fat Mattress
- Family
- Gary Farr
- Julie Felix
- Free
- Gypsy
- Richie Havens
- Heaven
- Marsha Hunt & White Trash
- Indo Jazz Fusions
- King Crimson (billed, but did not appear)
- The Liverpool Scene
- Marsupilami
- Mighty Baby
- The Moody Blues
- The Nice
- Tom Paxton
- Pentangle
- The Pretty Things
- Third Ear Band
- The Who

== See also ==
- Isle of Wight Festival
- Isle of Wight Festival 1970
