= Wigwam (Bob Dylan song) =

1970 song by Bob Dylan

- European picture sleeve

Single by Bob Dylan

from the album Self Portrait
- B-side: "Copper Kettle"
- Released: 1970
- Recorded: March 1970
- Genre: Country rock
- Length: 3:06 (album version); 3:28 (single version)
- Label: Columbia
- Songwriter: Bob Dylan
- Producer: Bob Johnston

Bob Dylan singles chronology
"Tonight I'll Be Staying Here with You" (1969)	"Wigwam" (1970)	"If Not for You" (1970)

Audio sample
- file; help

"Wigwam" is a song by Bob Dylan that was released on his 1970 album Self Portrait. It was a hit single that reached the Top 10 in several countries worldwide. The song's basic track, including "la-la" vocals, was recorded in early March 1970 in New York City. Later that month, producer Bob Johnston had brass instrument overdubs added to the track; these were recorded in Nashville, Tennessee at a session without Dylan present.

Critical appraisal of "Wigwam" has been mostly positive, and reviewers have called it a highlight of Self Portrait. Several artists have covered the composition, including Drafi Deutscher, whose version of it was a Top 20 hit in Germany.

== Recording ==
"Wigwam" was recorded during the sessions for Bob Dylan's Self Portrait album, and produced by Bob Johnston. The basic track was put on tape on March 4, 1970, at Columbia Studio A in New York City, and was labelled "New Song 1" on the recording sheet. The musicians on the basic track were Dylan, vocals and guitar; David Bromberg, guitar; Al Kooper, piano. On April 20, 2013, this early version of "Wigwam" was released as a single for Record Store Day, and on August 27 of the same year, it appeared on The Bootleg Series Vol. 10 – Another Self Portrait (1969–1971).

On March 17, 1970, at Columbia Recording Studios in Nashville, Tennessee, instrumental overdubs were recorded for "Wigwam" and several other songs. Dylan was not present for the overdubs, and they were overseen by Johnston.

In the song, Dylan sings "la-la" vocals, accompanied by horns, in an arrangement that has been called "mariachi-like", and "Tex-Mex". The feeling of the song has also been described as "campfire music" and as having a "hazy glow".

== Release ==
"Wigwam" was released on Self Portrait on June 8, 1970, and as a single in June or July. The single's B-side is "Copper Kettle". The single was a Top 10 hit in Belgium, Denmark (in 1972), France, Malaysia, the Netherlands, Singapore, and Switzerland, and was a Top 40 hit in Canada and Germany. In the US, the song reached No. 41 on the Billboard Hot 100, and No. 13 on the Billboard Top 40 Easy Listening chart.

Years later, in the early 2000s, "Wigwam" appeared on the "Limited Tour Edition" of The Essential Bob Dylan. The song was also included on the soundtrack to the film The Royal Tenenbaums (2001), as well as on the compilations One Hit Wonders and Hard to Find Classics (2003), Radio 2 - De Topcollectie '70 Vol. 2 (2010), Top 40 Hitarchief - 1970 (2011), and Remember the 70s Vol. 5.

== Reception ==
Reactions to the song have been generally positive. A review in Billboard magazine describes the track as "winning". Biographer Rober Shelton includes "Wigwam" among the "quality" songs on Self Portrait, describing it as "hard to forget"; Michael Gray similarly rates it as one of the "best tracks" on the album. Greil Marcus is likewise positive about the track, calling it "a great job of arranging". PopMatters reviewer Tom Useted calls the song "more than worthy", while NME writer Paul Stokes qualifies it as "melodious" and as demonstrating Dylan's "versatility and impact". In a review of The Royal Tenenbaums soundtrack, critic Heather Phares writes that the "hazy glow" of the song "add[s] to the album's strangely timeless but emotionally direct atmosphere." Critic Sean Egan writes that "Dylan la-las against a big brass arrangement in a not disagreeable way—but is 'not disagreeable' supposed to be what a Dylan track amounts to?"

On a more negative note, writer Seth Rogovoy describes "Wigwam" as a "bizarre, wordless vocal tune," although Rogovoy claims that this is merely a description of the song and not a negative judgment at all Critic Anthony Varesi considers the instrumentation on "Wigwam" to be an example of "horns misplaced", and "evidence of flaws" in Bob Johnston's production choices on Self Portrait. Pitchfork writer Rob Mitchum characterizes the song as "moaning along with the brass section" and "rather unpleasant".

== Covers ==
Artists who have covered "Wigwam" include the New Christy Minstrels, Sounds Orchestral, and the French orchestra leaders Raymond Lefèvre and Caravelli. Drafi Deutscher released a version with German lyrics, entitled "Weil ich dich liebe" ("Because I Love You"), that was a Top 20 hit in Germany in 1970.

== Charts ==
Chart (1970)	Peak position
Belgium Single Charts	9
Canadian RPM Singles Chart	17
Dutch Single Top 100	3
German Singles Charts	33
Malaysia Top 10	8
Swiss Music Charts	9
US Billboard Hot 100	41
US Billboard Top 40 Easy Listening	13
