= Tonight I'll Be Staying Here with You =

- West German picture sleeve

Single by Bob Dylan

from the album Nashville Skyline
- B-side: "Country Pie"
- Released: October 1969
- Recorded: February 17, 1969
- Studio: Columbia Studio A (Nashville, Tennessee)
- Genre: Country rock
- Length: 3:23
- Label: Columbia
- Songwriter: Bob Dylan
- Producer: Bob Johnston

Bob Dylan singles chronology
| "Lay Lady Lay" (1969) | "Tonight I'll Be Staying Here with You" (1969) | "Wigwam" (1970) |

"Tonight I'll Be Staying Here with You" is a song written by Bob Dylan from his 1969 album Nashville Skyline. It was the closing song of the album. The song was the third single released from the album, after "I Threw It All Away" and "Lay Lady Lay", reaching #50 on the US Billboard Hot 100 chart, and reaching the top 20 in other countries. It was anthologized on the compilation albums Bob Dylan's Greatest Hits Vol. II and Playlist: The Very Best of Bob Dylan '60s.

== Background and composition ==
Dylan arrived at the Nashville Skyline recording sessions having written just four songs, including "I Threw It All Away" and "Lay Lady Lay". Having recorded these and three other new songs on February 13 and 14, 1969, he needed a few more songs to fill out the album. "Tonight I'll Be Staying Here with You" was written over two days at the Ramada Inn where Dylan was staying, and recorded over 11 takes on February 17. The song is reminiscent of the last two songs from Dylan's previous album John Wesley Harding, "Down Along the Cove" and "I'll Be Your Baby Tonight", particularly the latter.

The lyrics of "Tonight I'll Be Staying Here with You" mark a change from many of Dylan's earlier love songs, which expressed a restlessness in search of perfect love. In contrast, "Tonight I'll Be Staying Here with You" expresses Dylan's devotion to his lover and willingness to stay with her. Even though the line from the title, which is repeated at the end of each verse, only explicitly expresses a willingness to stay "tonight", the implication of the song is that the singer is willing to stay permanently and become a family man. Train imagery runs throughout the song, but unlike earlier songs that used similar imagery, in this song even though the singer "can hear that whistle blowin'" he wants to "throw [his] ticket out the window" and let "a poor boy on the street" have his seat so that he can stay with his lover. The accompaniment includes piano, pedal steel guitar and bass guitar.

== Reception ==
Upon the single release, Cash Box said that unlike previous Dylan singles, "this ballad is honed to a fine edge and further sharpened through excellent production touches." Billboard said that "this strong original rhythm item...offers much of the same potential [as 'Lay Lady Lay']." Record World called it "another classic from the master." Beck Hansen told Mojo that "Tonight I'll Be Staying Here With You" is his favorite Bob Dylan song: "I didn't get too deep into his music until I got into the Nashville records. Those are the ones that really got to me, because I was so into country music when I was younger and hearing those records for the first time... I always liked his kind of throwaway love songs. For somebody who's a giant like him, who writes those great cinematic songs like 'Visions of Johanna' that draw you into a strange world, to just toss out a good little tune...that's an aspect of Dylan I always really appreciated."

== Live performances ==
Dylan did not play "Tonight I'll Be Staying Here with You" live in concert until the Rolling Thunder Revue tours in 1975 and 1976, and it was not played live again until February 1990 on the Neverending Tour. The first live performance was at Waltham, Massachusetts on November 22, 1975. The Rolling Thunder Revue version became an anthemic rocker, rather than the sweet country song from the original album. A live version of the song from the first Rolling Thunder Revue tour was released in 2002 on The Bootleg Series Vol. 5: Bob Dylan Live 1975, The Rolling Thunder Revue; it was also included on the 2019 box set The Rolling Thunder Revue: The 1975 Live Recordings, along with a rehearsal of the song. According to his official website, Dylan played the song 144 times in total between 1975 and 2006.
