= Bob Dylan's Greatest Hits Vol. II =

Greatest hits album by Bob Dylan
- Released: November 17, 1971
- Recorded: 1962–1971
- Genres: Folk rock; country
- Length: 77:31
- Label: Columbia
- Producers: John H. Hammond; Tom Wilson; Bob Johnston; Leon Russell

Bob Dylan chronology
New Morning (1970)	Bob Dylan's Greatest Hits Vol. II (1971)	Pat Garrett & Billy the Kid (1973)

Professional ratings
Review scores
Source	Rating
AllMusic	5/5 stars
Christgau's Record Guide	A
The Encyclopedia of Popular Music	4/5 stars
MusicHound Rock	3/5
The Rolling Stone Album Guide	5/5 stars
Tom Hull	A−

Bob Dylan's Greatest Hits Vol. II, also known as More Bob Dylan Greatest Hits in certain territories, is the second greatest hits album by American singer-songwriter Bob Dylan. It was released on November 17, 1971, through Columbia Records. A double album, the set contains previously released material spanning The Freewheelin' Bob Dylan (1963) to the "Watching the River Flow" single (released in June 1971), as well as previously unreleased recordings of songs written by Dylan which had been hits for other artists.

Compiled by Dylan himself, Bob Dylan's Greatest Hits Vol. II contains then-recent singles such as "Lay Lady Lay" and "If Not for You" as well as popular album tracks. The cover art features Dylan photographed performing at The Concert for Bangladesh in August 1971. The album was moderately successful, reaching the top 20 in both the US and UK. It has been well-received by critics, particularly for its inclusion of previously unreleased material.

== Background ==
1970 saw the releases of two new studio albums by Dylan – Self Portrait and New Morning. The former, a mix of covers, live tracks and a few new originals, received scathing reviews, and was seen as far below the standard set by Dylan's previous efforts, while the latter was more favorably received and tentatively considered by critics to be a return to form. However, the following year would see Dylan release few new recordings. Recording sessions produced by Leon Russell were held in March of 1971, but the only recordings to result were "Watching the River Flow" and "When I Paint My Masterpiece", with the former receiving a single release in June and both of which being included on the forthcoming greatest hits album.

== New material ==
In addition to the recent single, Bob Dylan's Greatest Hits Vol. II contains five previously unreleased tracks. "Tomorrow Is a Long Time", which has been covered by more than forty other artists, appears as a live performance recorded at Town Hall in New York on April 12, 1963. "When I Paint My Masterpiece" was first released by The Band on their album Cahoots (1971). Biographer Clinton Heylin has noted both this song and "Watching the River Flow" as expressing Dylan's frustration with "a dearth of inspiration". In "When I Paint My Masterpiece", the narrator journeys "through space and time", searching for a "muse" to provide him with inspiration while also hinting at the likelihood that he will never create the titular "masterpiece". In a 2020 interview, Dylan would state that the song "has something to do with the classical world, something that's out of reach. Someplace you'd like to be beyond your experience."

We just went in one afternoon and did it, it was just the two of us and the engineer, and it was very simple. We cut about five songs and chose three on the spot and mixed them… in the space of an afternoon… sometimes I wasn't even sure if it was a final take until we would just finish it and Bob would say 'okay, let's go and mix it'.

— Happy Traum

The final three tracks on the album ("I Shall Be Released", "You Ain't Goin' Nowhere", and "Down in the Flood") were recorded on September 24, 1971, with Happy Traum. These three songs originated in 1967 during the "Basement Tapes" period where Dylan recorded with The Band. Dylan wanted to include these songs as they had been successes for other artists, as well as the fact that he did not agree with some of Columbia's selections of songs to be included on the record. Like "When I Paint My Masterpiece", "I Shall Be Released" was first released by The Band, appearing on their 1968 album Music from Big Pink. William Ruhlmann of AllMusic offers multiple interpretations of its lyrics, such as an allegory for Dylan's personal and professional life following his 1966 motorcycle accident, and, more directly, as "one of the great prison songs of all time". Ruhlmann also notes the song's "religious connotations" as well as the reversal of "the usual passage of the sun in the sky" in the lines, "I see my light come shining/from the west unto the east".

"You Ain't Goin' Nowhere" was first released by The Byrds on their 1968 album Sweetheart of the Rodeo. Dylan's version contains a lyrical reference to Byrds guitarist and vocalist Roger McGuinn: "Pack up your money/pull up your tent, McGuinn". Rolling Stone Australia describes the 1971 recording as a "good-time banjo shuffle" in comparison with the "straight country" of the Byrds version and the "mysterious, doomy, yet somehow still festive" version Dylan recorded with The Band in 1967. Album closer "Down in the Flood" had been released by Sandy Denny on her 1971 album The North Star Grassman and the Ravens. Also known under the name "Crash on the Levee", Heylin considers "Down in the Flood" to be part of a group of songs stemming from the Basement Tapes which "approach the human condition from an offbeat angle".

== Track listing ==
All tracks are written by Bob Dylan.

Side one
No.	Title	Source	Length
1.	"Watching the River Flow"	single, 1971	3:32
2.	"Don't Think Twice, It's All Right"	The Freewheelin' Bob Dylan, 1963	3:36
3.	"Lay Lady Lay"	Nashville Skyline, 1969	3:14
4.	"Stuck Inside of Mobile with the Memphis Blues Again"	Blonde on Blonde, 1966	7:06
Total length:			17:28

Side two
No.	Title	Source	Length
1.	"I'll Be Your Baby Tonight"	John Wesley Harding, 1967	2:37
2.	"All I Really Want to Do"	Another Side of Bob Dylan, 1964	4:02
3.	"My Back Pages"	Another Side of Bob Dylan	4:21
4.	"Maggie's Farm"	Bringing It All Back Home, 1965	3:49
5.	"Tonight I'll Be Staying Here with You"	Nashville Skyline	3:21
Total length:			18:10

Side three
No.	Title	Source	Length
1.	"She Belongs to Me"	Bringing It All Back Home	2:46
2.	"All Along the Watchtower"	John Wesley Harding	2:30
3.	"The Mighty Quinn (Quinn the Eskimo)"	Self Portrait, 1970	2:43
4.	"Just Like Tom Thumb's Blues"	Highway 61 Revisited, 1965	5:25
5.	"A Hard Rain's A-Gonna Fall"	The Freewheelin' Bob Dylan	6:47
Total length:			20:11

Side four
No.	Title	Source	Length
1.	"If Not for You"	New Morning, 1970	2:38
2.	"It's All Over Now, Baby Blue"	Bringing It All Back Home	4:13
3.	"Tomorrow Is a Long Time"	Previously unreleased (live at Town Hall, New York City, April 12, 1963)	3:01
4.	"When I Paint My Masterpiece"	Previously unreleased (recorded March 16–18, 1971)	3:22
5.	"I Shall Be Released"	Previously unreleased (recorded September 24, 1971)	3:01
6.	"You Ain't Goin' Nowhere"	Previously unreleased (recorded September 24, 1971)	2:41
7.	"Down in the Flood"	Previously unreleased (recorded September 24, 1971)	2:46
Total length:			21:42

Note: The UK release is titled 'More Bob Dylan Greatest Hits' and has a slightly different track listing. "She Belongs To Me" is replaced by "Positively 4th Street" and "It's All Over Now, Baby Blue" is replaced by "New Morning".

== Charts ==
=== Weekly charts ===
Chart (1971–72)	Peak position
Canada Top Albums/CDs (RPM)	6
Spanish Albums Chart	21
UK Albums (Official Charts)	12
US Billboard 200	14

=== Year-end charts ===
Chart (1972)	Position
US Billboard 200	51
