= Blonde on Blonde (rock group) =

Rock group from South Wales

- Origin: Newport, Wales
- Genres: Psychedelic rock
- Years active: 1967–1972
- Past members: Ralph Denyer; Les Hicks; Richard Hopkins; Gareth Johnson; David Thomas; Graham Davis

Blonde on Blonde was a guitar-led psychedelic rock group from South Wales.

The band was formed in Newport in 1967 by vocalist/guitarist Ralph Denyer, drummer Les Hicks, bassist/organist Richard Hopkins and guitarist/sitar player Gareth Johnson. The band was named after Bob Dylan's 1966 album of the same name.

In 1968, the quartet left Wales for London, and was joined by guitarist Simon Lawrance, playing clubs such as Middle Earth and appearing on the BBC TV series How Late It Is. Signing to Pye Records, they released their first album, Contrasts, produced by Barry Murray, in 1969. The album included the Robin Williamson covers "No Sleep Blues" and "I Need My Friend", and a cover of The Beatles' "Eleanor Rigby". That summer, they appeared at the Isle of Wight Festival.

1970's Rebirth was released on Ember Records after a personnel change that saw Ralph Denyer joining Aquila and replaced by school friend David Thomas. Thomas' introduction gave the band a tougher, rock-oriented sound. Their second album included Moody Blues–styled ballads ("Castles in the Sky"), progressive rock songs ("You'll Never Know Me/Release") and fuzz-guitar-based rockers ("November").

In 1971, Richard Hopkins left and was replaced by Graham Davis. Blonde on Blonde's final album, Reflections on a Life, was released by Ember Records in 1971, but the band achieved only modest commercial success. They disbanded in early 1972.

Ralph Denyer went on to co-write The Guitar Handbook with Isaac Guillory. He died in 2011.

Richard Hopkins died in late October 2022. Les Hicks died the same month, on 29 October 2022.

== Discography ==
=== Singles ===
- 1968 - "All Day All Night" / "Country Life"
- 1969 - "I Need My Friend" / "Conversationally Making the Grade"
- 1969 - "Castles in the Sky" / "Circles"

=== Albums ===
- June 1969 - Contrasts
- 1970 - Rebirth
- 1971 - Reflections on a Life
