= Lay Lady Lay =

1969 song by Bob Dylan

- Italian picture sleeve

Single by Bob Dylan

from the album Nashville Skyline
- B-side: "Peggy Day"
- Released: July 19, 1969
- Recorded: February 14, 1969
- Studio: Columbia Studio A (Nashville, Tennessee)
- Genre: Country rock
- Length: 3:20
- Label: Columbia
- Songwriter: Bob Dylan
- Producer: Bob Johnston

Bob Dylan singles chronology
"I Threw It All Away" (1969)	"Lay Lady Lay" (1969)	"Tonight I'll Be Staying Here with You" (1969)

Audio sample
- file; help

"Lay Lady Lay", sometimes rendered "Lay, Lady, Lay", is a song written by Bob Dylan and originally released in 1969 on his Nashville Skyline album. Like many of the tracks on the album, Dylan sings the song in a low croon, rather than in the high nasal singing style associated with his earlier (and eventually later) recordings. The song has become a standard and has been covered by numerous bands and artists over the years. The song, Dylan's final top 10 hit, peaked at No. 7 on the Billboard Hot 100.

== Bob Dylan version ==
"Lay Lady Lay" was originally written for the soundtrack of the film Midnight Cowboy but wasn't submitted in time to be included in the finished film. Joel Whitburn said instead that the song was "written for his wife Sarah Lowndes". In a 1971 interview for which transcripts were auctioned in 2020, Dylan said the song was written for Barbra Streisand, with Streisand later adding that Dylan wanted to sing a duet with her.

Dylan's recording was released as a single in July 1969 and quickly became his fourth and last top 10 U.S. hit, peaking at number seven on the Billboard Hot 100 for the consecutive weeks of September 6 and 13. The single did even better in the United Kingdom where it reached number five on the UK Singles Chart. Like many of the tracks on Nashville Skyline, the song is sung by Dylan in a warm, relatively low sounding voice, rather than the more abrasive nasal singing style with which he had become famous. Dylan attributed his "new" voice to having quit smoking before recording the album, but some unreleased bootleg recordings from the early 1960s reveal that, in fact, Dylan had used a similar singing style before.

Don Everly of the Everly Brothers recounted in a 1986 Rolling Stone interview that Dylan performed parts of the song for them after a late 1960s appearance by the duo in New York, as they were "looking for songs, and he was writing 'Lay Lady Lay' at the time." Despite a popular story that the Everly Brothers rejected the song due to misunderstanding the lyrics as sexual in nature, Everly continued "He sang parts of it, and we weren't quite sure whether he was offering it to us or not. It was one of those awestruck moments." In a 1994 interview Don Everly further explained the encounter, stating that "It really wasn't a business meeting ... It wasn't that kind of atmosphere." The Everly Brothers later covered the song on their EB 84 album, 15 years after Dylan's release.

Dylan first played the song to group of singer-songwriters including Joni Mitchell, Graham Nash, and Kris Kristofferson at Cash's house outside of Nashville when they were passing a guitar and singing a song. Drummer Kenny Buttrey has said that he had a difficult time coming up with a drum part for the song. Dylan had suggested bongos, while producer Bob Johnston said cowbells. In order to "show them how bad their ideas were", Buttrey used both instruments together. Kris Kristofferson, who was working as a janitor in the studio at the time, was enlisted to hold the bongos in one hand and the cowbell in the other. Buttrey moved the sole overhead drum mic over to these new instruments. When he switches back to the drums for the choruses the drumset sounds distant due to not being directly miked. The take heard on the album is the first take and is one of Buttrey's own favorite performances.

The song was also a favourite of popular singer Madonna, "I used to listen to that one record, 'Lay Lady Lay', in my brother's bedroom in the basement of our house," she recalled. "I'd lie on the bed and play that song and cry all the time. I was going through adolescence; I had hormones raging through my body. Don't ask me why I was crying – it's not a sad song. But that's the only record of his that I really listened to."

=== Music and lyrics ===
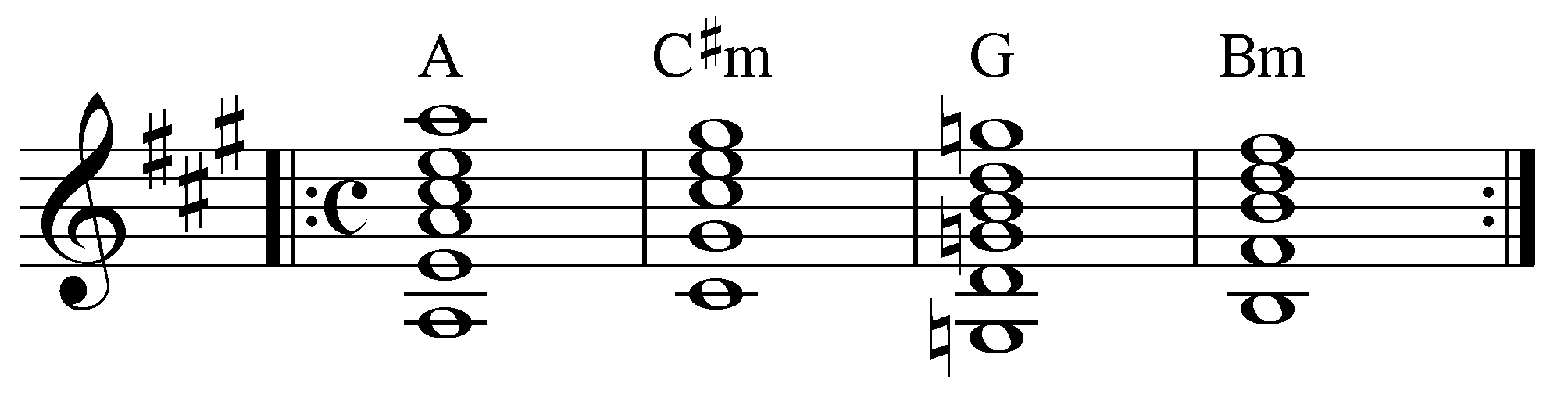
Bob Dylan's "Lay, Lady, Lay" chord progression features a descending chromatic line in the upper voice: $\hat 8$–♯$\hat 7$–♮$\hat 7$–$\hat 6$.

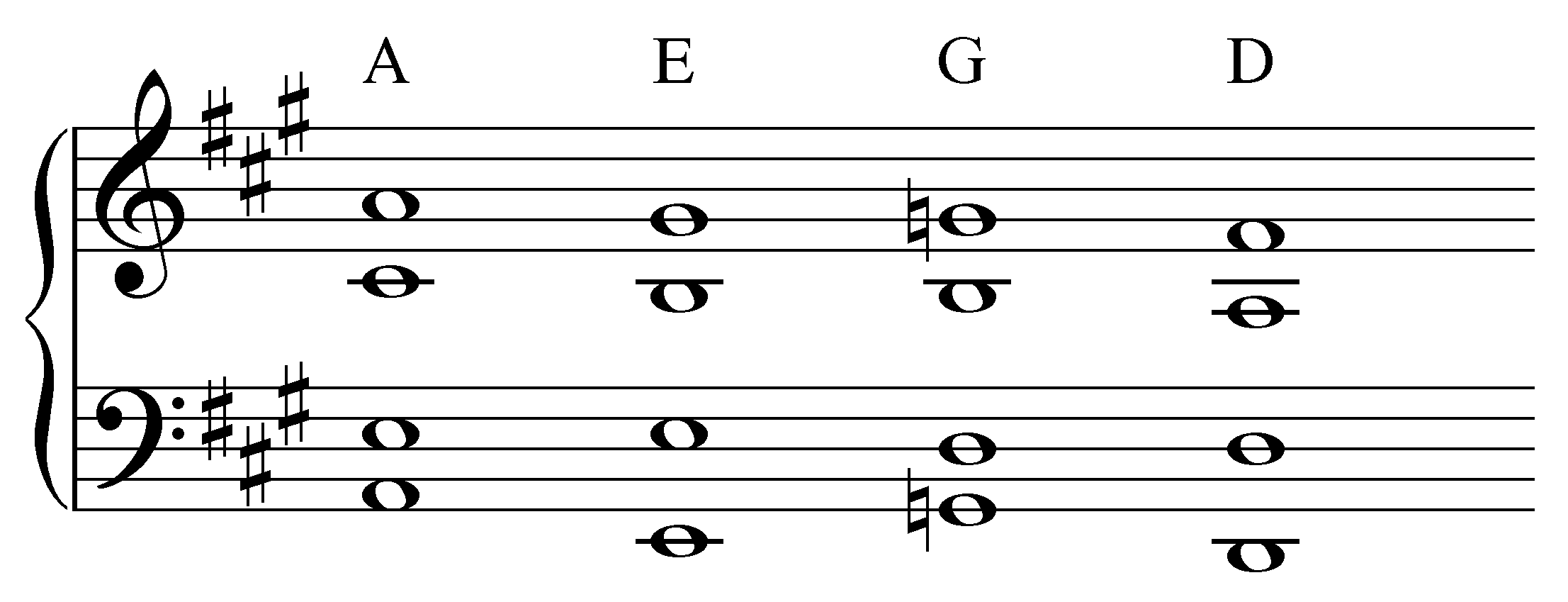
Chromatic descending 5-6 sequence (I-V-♭VII-IV) from which "Lay, Lady, Lay" sequence is derived, through use of the parallel minor on the third chord (I-iii-♭VII-ii)

Written in the key of A major, or A Mixolydian, the song's chord progression features a descending chromatic line and Dylan's voice occupies a range from F#_{2} to D_{4}. The bass is most often based on the chromatic descent or otherwise emphasizing the modal center of A. The chief hook in "Lay Lady Lay", a song with far more hooks than is typical for Dylan, is a recurring four-note pedal steel guitar riff. The final verse is separated from the rest of the song by the bridge and an ascending organ riff also recurs in this verse. The song's distinctive drum part is performed by Kenny Buttrey, who regarded his contribution to the song as one of his best performances on a record. Lyrically the song speaks of romantic and sexual anticipation as the singer beseeches his lover to spend the night with him.

=== Live performances and other releases ===
Dylan played the song live for the first time at the Isle of Wight on August 31, 1969; a recording is included on Isle of Wight Live, part of the 4-CD deluxe edition of The Bootleg Series Vol. 10: Another Self Portrait (1969–1971). Performances of the song from 1974 and 1976 are included on the Before the Flood and Hard Rain live albums. The song has been performed frequently by Dylan since the late 1980s during his Never Ending Tour.

"Lay Lady Lay" appears on Dylan's Greatest Hits, Volume II album, as well as on the Masterpieces, Biograph, The Best of Bob Dylan, Vol. 1, and The Essential Bob Dylan compilation albums.

=== Reception ===
Billboard described "Lay Lady Lay" as an "Infectious and appealing folk number with a country flavor." Record World said it was a "lovely and winning number." Cash Box called it a "strong sales prospect to break onto best seller charts."

=== Personnel ===
- Bob Dylan - guitar, harmonica, keyboards, vocals
- Pete Drake - pedal steel guitar
- Charlie Daniels - guitar
- Charlie McCoy - bass
- Kenny Buttrey - drums, cowbell, bongos
- Bob Wilson - organ, piano
- Charlie Bragg - engineer
- Neil Wilburn - engineer

=== Charts ===
==== Weekly charts ====
Chart (1969)	Peak position
Australia (Go-Set)	18
Canada RPM Top Singles	8
Canada RPM Adult Contemporary	8
Ireland (IRMA)	13
New Zealand (Listener)	7
UK (OCC)	5
US Billboard Hot 100	7
US Billboard Adult Contemporary	19
US Cash Box Top 100	8

==== Year-end charts ====
Chart (1969)	Rank
Canada RPM Top Singles	61
US Billboard Hot 100	52
US Cash Box	64

=== Certifications ===
Region	Certification	Certified units/sales
New Zealand (RMNZ)	Gold	15,000^{‡}
United Kingdom (BPI)	Silver	200,000^{‡}
United States (RIAA)	Platinum	1,000,000^{‡}
^{‡} Sales+streaming figures based on certification alone.

== Other recordings ==
The song has become a standard and has been covered by numerous bands and artists over the years, beside the singles recorded by the Byrds, Duran Duran and Ministry described below, the over 10 minute long version by the Isley Brothers for their 1971 album Givin' It Back stands out. The 1970 single version by Ferrante & Teicher reached number 71 in Canada. Equally prominent are the interpretations by Melanie (1971 on Garden in the City) and by the Everly Brothers in 1984.

The soul band The Magnificent Men released a single of Dylan’s composition in 1970, as did blues guitarist Roy Gaines and in 1973 singer Brook Benton interpreted the song as a soul ballad with female background Gospel vocals. Early Country adaptations were recorded in the same year as its original release by Pete Drake, the steel guitarist of the Dylan's recording. In 1976 Hoyt Axton sang the song for his album Fearless. Many instrumental interpretations were released early on like one of the rare single releases by Keith Jarrett with a solo piano recording of the song. Jazz saxophonist John Handy recorded a version arranged by Benny Golson for a single release with "Spinning Wheel" on its B-side. Other instrumental interpretations came from Free Creek (Music from Free Creek and single in 1973), Made in Sweden (single B-side, 1969), Tony Mottola's Guitar Factory (1970) with Dick Hyman on keyboards, who released his own version on single also as early as 1969. Even more Easy listening recordings came from Hugo Montenegro (1970) and other more obscure releases like the Harry Roche Constellation (Spiral, 1973) or a British single by a "Mr Joe English". A straight cover was delivered by Ramblin' Jack Elliott (Bull Durham Sacks and Railroad Tracks, 1970), whereas reggae versions like the one by Nicky Thomas (Tell It Like It Is, 1972) and twenty years later by Bob Andy (Fire Burning, 1995) are special.

Also in the 1990s the New Wave duo Malaria! recorded their version of the song (1993 on Cheerio), as did the synth-pop band Minimal Compact Returning Wheel (Classics, Remixes & Archives), 2004). More recent interpretations by Country singers are by Deana Carter (The Chain, 2007) and Lorrie Morgan (Letting Go...Slow, 2016). A duet by Magnet with Gemma Hayes was lavishly arranged with horns and strings for the 2003 Magnet album On Your Side, and released also as single the following year. Indie rock band U.S. Maple published the song also in 2003 on their album Purple on Time, and The Flaming Lips recorded a version in 2021 for the Uncut compilation Dylan ...Revisited (14 of His Greatest Songs Reinterpreted for Uncut), and again more mainstream Pete Yorn in 2020 (Sings the Classics). Blues musician Buddy Guy recorded the song for his album Bring 'Em In (2005), jazz singer Cassandra Wilson in 2003 for Glamoured Her African colleague Angélique Kidjo delivered a version of "Lay Lady Lay" in 2012 for the Dylan tribute compilation Chimes of Freedom (The Songs of Bob Dylan) which benefitted Amnesty International.

Dylan's composition "Lay Lady Lay" is not to be confused by songs with very similar names (intentionally or not), like "Lady Lady Lady Lay" or often simply "Lady Lay" written by Michel Jourdan, Pierre Groscolas and Tony Hiller in 1973, or the Don Cook and Rafe Van Hoy original "Lady Lay Down" published in 1978 and recorded first by John Conlee, then a. o. by Paul Anka und Tom Jones, both in 1981.

=== The Byrds version ===
"Lay Lady Lay"
- 1969 Dutch picture sleeve

Single by the Byrds
- B-side: "Old Blue"
- Released: May 2, 1969
- Recorded: March 27 & April 18, 1969
- Studio: Columbia, Hollywood, California; Columbia, Nashville, Tennessee
- Genre: Rock
- Length: 3:18
- Label: Columbia
- Songwriter: Bob Dylan
- Producer: Bob Johnston

The Byrds singles chronology
"Bad Night at the Whiskey" (1969)	"Lay Lady Lay" (1969)	"Wasn't Born to Follow" (1969)

The Byrds' recording of "Lay Lady Lay" was released as a single on May 2, 1969, and reached number 132 on the Billboard chart but failed to break into the UK Singles Chart. The song was recorded as a non-album single shortly after the release of the Byrds' seventh studio album, Dr. Byrds & Mr. Hyde. The Byrds decided to cover the song after Bob Dylan played the band his newly recorded Nashville Skyline album at band leader Roger McGuinn's house. The Byrds recorded "Lay Lady Lay" on March 27, 1969, but producer Bob Johnston overdubbed a female choir onto the recording on April 18, 1969, without the Byrds' consent. The single was then released and it was only after it had been issued that the band became aware of the addition of the female choir. The group were incensed, feeling that the choral overdub was incongruous and an embarrassment. The Byrds were so upset at Johnston's tampering with the song behind their backs, that they never again worked with him.

Despite the band's displeasure with the finished single, many critics felt that the presence of the female choir added a dramatic touch which heightened the song's emotional appeal. Journalist Derek Johnson, writing in the NME, commented "The harmonic support behind the solo vocal is really outstanding, largely because the Byrds have been augmented by a girl chorus. This, plus the familiar acoustic guitars, the attractive melody and the obstructive beat, makes it one of the group's best discs in ages." When "Lay Lady Lay" was released on The Byrds box set in 1990, it was presented without its choral overdub at McGuinn's insistence. This alternate version, without the female choir, was included as a bonus track on the remastered Dr. Byrds & Mr. Hyde CD in 1997. It was also included on the 2002 reissue of The Byrds Play Dylan and the 2006 box set, There Is a Season.

=== Duran Duran version ===
Duran Duran recorded a pop rock version of the song, appearing as track five on their 1995 covers album, Thank You. Nick Rhodes has stated on the band's official website (answering an Ask Katy question in 2008 about the second single taken from Thank You) "I seem to remember my concern at that time was, in fact, our record label's—Capitol in America and EMI for the rest of the world—deciding to split their decision on their choice for the first single, "White Lines" in the US and "Perfect Day" for the rest of the world. Hence, there was no worldwide focus and both territories forced to use the other track as their second single, so it didn't really work out to be an ideal situation for anyone. I'm not sure what I would've chosen for a second single, possibly "Lay Lady Lay", but then I am still very happy with the way "Perfect Day" turned out."

=== Ministry version ===
"Lay Lady Lay"

Single by Ministry

from the album Filth Pig
- B-side: "Paisley"
- Released: February 1996
- Recorded: 1995
- Studio: Trax, Chicago
- Genre: Industrial metal, alternative metal
- Length: 5:44 (album version); 5:11 (edit)
- Label: Warner Bros.
- Songwriter: Bob Dylan
- Producers: Hypo Luxa, Hermes Pan

Ministry singles chronology
"The Fall" (1995)	"Lay Lady Lay" (1996)	"Reload" (1996)

Music video
- “Lay Lady Lay” on YouTube

American industrial metal band Ministry covered "Lay Lady Lay" during the eighth Bridge School Benefit charity concert in October 1994, with Pearl Jam lead singer Eddie Vedder performing backing vocals. a studio version of the song was recorded and released as a single from Ministry's sixth studio album, Filth Pig, in February 1996 and reached number 128 on the UK Singles Chart. The song also appears on the band's 2008 covers album, Cover Up. Initially, frontman Al Jourgensen wanted to cover Jimmy Webb song "Wichita Lineman", but had to choose another song after watching Urge Overkill performing it live. During the recording, Bill Rieflin was asked to perform drums, but he rejected and quit the band shortly after, with Rey Washam replacing him and thus making his debut with Ministry.

The single release included two versions of "Lay Lady Lay"; one being the standard album version and the other being a shorter edited version. In the Rolling Stone magazine's review of Filth Pig, critic Jon Wiederhorn wrote that the cover "amalgamates a deep distorted bass line, clicking electronic percussion, jangling acoustic guitars, ominous curls of feedback and [Al] Jourgensen's trademark howls." According to Jourgensen, Bob Dylan personally called him to say his version was "badass."

CD single track listing

No.	Title	Length
1.	"Lay Lady Lay" (edit)	5:11
2.	"Lay Lady Lay" (album version)	5:44
3.	"Paisley"	4:50
4.	"Scarecrow" (live)	8:18
