= Ray Foulk =

Founder of the Isle of Wight Festivals of Music

Raymond Ian Barnes Foulk MA, Dip Arch, RIBA, is an English architect, author, environmentalist, art collector, exhibition curator and rock music festival promoter/organiser. Foulk founded the Isle of Wight Festivals of Music in 1968 with his brothers Ronald Anthony (Ron) and John Philip (known as Bill) Foulk. Born in Chesterfield, Derbyshire Foulk was brought up in the Isle of Wight from the age of 10 with his younger sister and three brothers by their recently widowed mother. Foulk is best known as the promoter who negotiated for and signed Bob Dylan for the 2nd Isle of Wight Festival 1969 - the artist's first full concert, pre-announced, advertised or paid performance since May 1966 and his only such performance in nearly eight years. Foulk is also well known for provoking an Act of Parliament (the Isle of Wight Act 1971).

== Early education and career ==
Whilst living in the Isle of Wight, Ray Foulk attended as a boarder at Liverpool Blue Coat School. At 16, Ray with his brother Ronald Foulk, 17, were simultaneously ‘asked to leave’ due to low academic achievement. During an apprenticeship which followed, Foulk attended the Southern College of Art – School of Printing, Portsmouth and Southampton, qualifying with City and Guilds of London Institute (1961-6) Compositor’s Work in Printing, Final. The five-year printing (compositor) apprenticeship was at the Isle of Wight County Press. In 1967 he established a small scale printing and design business, Solent Graphics Ltd in Totland Bay, Isle of Wight.

== Festival and music promoting ==
With brothers Ron and Bill, with support of sister Dorothy Rosemary (Jo) Ray Foulk staged an all night ‘festival’, the First Isle of Wight Festival of Music 1968, billed ‘The Great South Coast Pop Festivity’, on 31 August, starring United States West Coast band Jefferson Airplane. For the 2nd Isle of Wight Festival of Music, a year later, Foulk and his brothers identified Bob Dylan as one of only three world-class acts capable of bringing a substantial audience across the water to the Isle of Wight. The artist's appearance was his first full concert or pre-announced performance more than three years' absence from concerts and touring. The festival attracted an audience of between 150,000 and 200,000. In 1970, Ray Foulk and his brothers staged the third Isle of Wight Festival 1970 which was the largest such event in British history and is believed to remain so to the present day, with an estimated attendance of 600,000. The raft of world-class artists appearing included Jimi Hendrix in his last UK or major performance, Joan Baez, Miles Davis, Leonard Cohen, Joni Mitchell, Emerson, Lake & Palmer, the Who, the Doors, Kris Kristofferson, Chicago, Jethro Tull, Ten Years After, the Moody Blues, Free, John Sebastian, Donovan, Melanie, Sly and the Family Stone, Procol Harum and Richie Havens. The festival created a furore among hostile Isle of Wight politicians and resulted in a parliamentary bill to curtail further large-scale overnight gatherings on the Isle of Wight. In 1971, the act passed into law, curtailing all such future festivals. Following the three Isle of Wight Festivals, Foulk went on to promote (with brother Ronald) the first ever rock music event ‘Rock at the Oval - Goodbye Summer’ at The Oval (Surrey County Cricket Club, Kennington, London SE11) starring the Who and Rod Stewart, 18 September 1971, and the first ever music event at Wembley Stadium, The London Rock and Roll Show, starring Chuck Berry, Little Richard, Bill Haley, Bo Diddley and Jerry Lee Lewis, on 5 August 1972. In September 1972, Foulk and his brother Ronald staged two further concerts at the Oval, starring Emerson, Lake and Palmer and Frank Zappa.

== Legislation ==
The Isle of Wight's MP Mark Woodnutt (Conservative) succeeded in passing a Private Member’s Bill – The Isle of Wight Act, 1971 – to control large scale gatherings in the Isle of Wight. Though not an outright ban, gatherings of more than 5,000 attending during the hours of 12.00 midnight and 6.00am were severely restricted. The Act effectively prevented further large scale festivals on the Island until the revival of the Isle of Wight Festival in 2002. Mark Woodnutt MP, Jerry Wiggin MP and seven other conservative members attempted to extend the Isle of Wight legislation to cover the whole of the United Kingdom with the ‘Night Assemblies Bill’. This was eventually shelved after the government appointed Denis Stevenson to chair a committee to examine the issue. Partly due to evidence taken from Isle of Wight officials, notably Isle of Wight Rural District Council Medical Officer of Health, Dr Douglas Quantrill, and Chief Constable of Hampshire, (Sir) Douglas Osmond, Stevenson concluded that further legislation was unnecessary.

== Later education ==
In 1985 Foulk completed an Open University BA degree with first class honours, and in the same year accepted a place at Christ's College, Cambridge to read Architecture. In his Cambridge application CV, Foulk proudly boasted of his background as a festival promoter. At the last minute, the offer of a college room was withdrawn and he was made to lodge outside. He discovered why only in 2010 when, at a 25-year reunion of his architecture class, his former studio master told him that, after he had interviewed Foulk and awarded him a place, the senior tutor at Christ's complained that he had accepted 'this person who organised a drugs festival on the Isle of Wight'. Foulk obtained his Cambridge BA (hons) degree in 1988 (elevated to MA in 1989), and completed the Diploma in Architecture at Oxford Polytechnic (now Oxford Brookes University) and the RIBA Part III, qualifying as an architect in 1991.

== Media ==
Ray Foulk is a regular contributor to radio and television programmes about the Isle of Wight Festivals, including: Return to Rock Island, BBC South, 2003. Festival Britannia, BBC Four, 2010. Tom Stroud's 1970 Isle of Wight Festival, Isle of Wight Radio, August 2010. John Hannam Meets Ray Foulk, Isle of Wight Radio, 30 August 2015. People's History of Pop Music Festivals, BBC Radio Solent, 7 February 2016. On the Beat with Spencer Leigh, Radio Merseyside, 26 June 2016. Whistable Sessions Radio Show, February 2025

== Film credits ==
Producer: The London Rock and Roll Show, Notting Hill, 1973. Cast: Message to Love – The Isle of Wight Festival, British Broadcasting Corporation (BBC), Castle Music Pictures, Initial Film and Television, 1997. Interviewee: From Wight to Wight, Morgane Production, France, 2010.

== Leisure development ==
Between 1972 and 1975, Ray Foulk was Consultant to the Milton Keynes Development Corporation (MKDC) on the leisure provision for the new city, designing and formulating Central Milton Keynes City Club. Foulk worked alongside architect Derek Walker for three years and brought the visionary R Buckminster Fuller to address the architects of MKDC.

== Decorative arts exhibitions ==
Ray Foulk’s interest in design history and collecting culminated in the establishment of a decorative arts gallery, 'The Foulk Lewis Collection,' in Fulham Road, London SW10. In 1979, with partner (Celia) Jenny Lewis, Foulk organised and curated a landmark exhibition of some of the finest French Furniture and objects of the Art Deco period, the Ruhlmann Centenary Exhibition (9 July – 7 September 1979). This was first one-man exhibition of the work of the great French Ébéniste and designer Émile-Jacques Ruhlmann since his 1934 retrospective exhibition in Paris, a year after his death. Foulk followed this with a further exhibition of exquisite French furniture, The Extraordinary Work of Süe et Mare (30 November 1979 – 24 February 1970), The Foulk Lewis Collection, London Following a period of full-time education and architectural practice Foulk returned to curating decorative arts exhibitions, focussing on British works, beginning with Betty Joel – Celtic Spirit from the Orient, The Kingston Exchange, Kingston upon Thames and The Millinery Works, Islington (1996). Two further exhibitions at the Kingston Exchange were curated by Foulk: Keith Murray (ceramic artist), the Architect Potter (1996); Geoffrey Baxter (Whitefriars Glass) – Art Deco and Beyond (1996).

== Environmental campaigning and environmental architecture ==
In the approach of the millennium, Foulk founded and became the executive organiser of the environmental educational charity 'The Millennium (Energy and Environment) Debate' (1997-2006). Notable live events included: Global Warming Debate, St James Church, Piccadilly, London (2 June 1998); A Consultation, ‘Bridging the Gap’, St George's House, Windsor Castle (21-22 September 1998); The Oxford Energy and Environment Festival (12-18 November 1998); Oxford Union Debate on genetically modified organisms (14 June 1999). In 1999, Foulk founded ‘The GMO Campaign’, organising events in protest to the release of genetically modified organisms in the environment. In 1999, Foulk founded with daughter, Caroline Foulk, the in-schools environmental education programme 'Blue Planet Day’ (1999-2006) with the first event held at Donnington Middle School, Oxford (25 November 1999). With a team of up to 20 environmental volunteers and environmentalists the programme presented some 100 all-day events in most of Oxfordshire middle and secondary schools, working with more than 20,000 children, aged 12–14. In 2003, Foulk was shortlisted (as one of five nominees) for the Schumacher Award (2003) presented annually at the Bristol Schumacher Lectures, in recognition of his 'Blue Planet Day' initiative. Foulk won the 2011 Oxford City Council David Steel Sustainable Buildings Award for his ‘Blue Planet Corner’ development, Oxford.

== Publications ==
- Foulk, Raymond, Émile-Jacques Ruhlmann Centenary 1879 – 1979 (1979) the Foulk Lewis Collection, London. ISBN 0 9529915 0 0
- Foulk, Raymond The Extraordinary Work of Sϋe et Mare: La Compagnie des Arts Francais (1979) the Foulk Lewis Collection, London. ISBN 0-9529915-1-9
- Foulk, Raymond with Lewis, Jenny, Betty Joel - Celtic Spirit from the Orient (1996), the Foulk Lewis Collection, Oxford. OCLC 59478818
- Foulk, Ray with Foulk, Caroline, When the World Came to the Isle of Wight, Vol 1: Stealing Dylan from Woodstock (2015) Medina Publishing, Surbiton, Surrey. ISBN 978-1-909339-50-7
- Foulk, Ray with Foulk, Caroline, When the World Came to the Isle of Wight, Vol 2: The Last Great Event (2016), Medina Publishing, Surbiton, Surrey. ISBN 978-1-909339-58-3
- Foulk, Ray with Foulk, Caroline, Picasso's Revenge (2019) Medina Publishing, Cowes, Isle of Wight. 978-1-911487-34-0
- Foulk, Ray with Foulk, Caroline, When the World Came to the Isle of Wight, Vol 2: The Last Great Event (2025), revised edition in paperback. Medina Publishing, Cowes, Isle of Wight. 978-1-916866-20-1

== Further reading – Festivals ==
- Dring, Simon (1 September 1969) 150,000 go wild as Dylan rocks isle, The Daily Telegraph, p. 1.
- Logue, Christopher Logue (13 Sept 1969) A feir feld ful of folk – Second thoughts on the Isle of Wight Festival (reprinted in Thomson, Elizabeth and Gutman, David (1991) The Dylan Companion, First paperback edition by PAPERMAC, Macmillan, London, pp. 129–34. ISBN 0-333-49826-7).
- The Times, London, Saturday Review, p. 1.
- Paris Match – cover story (13 September 1969) Le Hippy Cyclone.
- Haden-Guest, Anthony (5 October 1970) Was this the End of Rocktopia? The Daily Telegraph Magazine Number 3, pp. 18–26.
- Green, Richard (18 September 1971) New Musical Express – NME’s Weekly Good Time Guide, A Hard Rock Road to the Oval, p. 1.
- Flanagan, Bill, (December 1987) Time Loves a Hero, Q Magazine, London, p. 52.
- Hinton, Brian (1990) Nights in Wight Satin – an illustrated history of the Isle of Wight Pop Festivals, Isle of Wight County Council. ISBN 0-906328-46-2.
- Thomson, Elizabeth and Gutman, David (1991) The Dylan Companion – Polly Toynbee: Pop festival blast-off pp. 127–8 (reprinted from Observer, London, 31 August 1969), First paperback edition by PAPERMAC, Macmillan, London. ISBN 0-333-49826-7.
- Glancey, Jonathan (30 July 1994), Teenage Trippers with a ticket to Ryde, The Independent, London, p. 37.
- Heylin, Clinton (2000), Bob Dylan: Behind the Shades – Take Two, Viking, London, pp. 306–9. ISBN 0-670-885061.
- Blake, Mark (Ed.) (2005) Dylan – Visions, Portraits & Back Pages: Eyewitness Isle of Wight – Breaking cover for the first time since his bike crash, Dylan wowed The Beatles, Eric Clapton and the inmates of Parkhurst Prison, Dorling Kindersley, London, p. 116-7. ISBN 0-7566-1718-9.
- Weston, Chris (2009) The Last Great Event, Freshwater, Isle of Wight. ISBN 0-9545233-3-4.
- Shelton, Robert (2011) Revised and updated edition by Elizabeth Thomson and Patrick Humphries No Direction Home The Life & Music of Bob Dylan, Omnibus Press, p. 277. ISBN 978-184938-458-2.
- Eagan, Sean (2011) The Mammoth Book of Bob Dylan – Johnny Black, Eyewitness: Dylan at the Isle of Wight, Robinson, London, pp. 163–8. ISBN 978-1-84901-466-3.
- Perrigon, Judith (23 August 2014) De passage à . . . l’île de Wight, Royaume-Uni – Lettre à un fan des sixties, Le magazine du Monde, pp31–37.
- Wright, Richard (27 May 2016) At last, the great event detailed, Weekender, Isle of Wight County Press. P14.
- Campbell, James, (24 June 2016) Hey Joan – Remembering the second Isle of Wight Festival, The Times Literary Supplement, London, p. 17.

== Further reading – decorative arts ==
- Davis, Frank (16 August 1979) Simple Designs in Rare Woods – Émile-Jacques Ruhlmann (1979-1933), Country Life, London, Vol. CLXVI No.4284, p. 475.
- Father of Art Deco, (October 1979) Architectural Review, Vol.CLXVI No.992.
- Hillier, Bevis (4 June 1978) Antiques Department of Fair Trading, Telegraph Sunday Magazine No.89, p. 36-7.
- Arwas, Victor (1982) Art Deco (second edition), Academy Editions, London, pp. 52–3 ISBN 0-85670-586-1

== Further reading – environmentalism and architecture ==
- Cason, Hugh (1975) Spirit of the Age, Ch. 8: Dreams and Awakenings, British Broadcasting Corporation, London, p. 225. ISBN 0-563-12897-6
- Blue Planet provokes green thinking (14 February 2003), The Oxford Times, Oxford, p. 6.
