= Alberta (blues) =

Traditional blues songs

"Alberta" is a blues song of uncertain origin.

== History ==
Mary Wheeler, in her Steamboatin' Days: Folk Songs of the River Packet Era (Baton Rouge, La.: Louisiana State University Press, 1944), records a song she collected from Gabriel "Uncle Gabe" Hester, with the lyrics:

Alberta, let yo' hair hang low,
Alberta, let yo' hair hang low,
I'll give you mo' gold than yo' apron will hold,
Ef you'll jes' let yo' hair hang low.

Alberta, what's on yo' mind?
Alberta, what's on yo' mind?
You keep me worried, you keep me bothered, all the time.
Alberta, what's on yo' mind?

Alberta, don't you treat me unkind,
Alberta, don't you treat me unkind,
'Cause I'm worried, 'cause I'm bothered, all the time.
Alberta, don't you treat me unkind.

Wheeler also reports Hester's reminiscences of the steamboat work songs he had sung as a roustabout in his younger days. However, Wheeler's account does not explicitly give any evidence for Roger McGuinn's statement that, "This is a song sung by the stevedores who worked on the Ohio River."

The song became popular in the American folk music revival.

- Bob Gibson recorded it for his Carnegie Concert (1957), and it was included on Sing Out!, vol. 8, no. 3 (1959).
- Jerry Silverman, Folk Blues, vol. 1 (c. 1959)
- Burl Ives, with the title "Lenora, Let Your Hair Hang Down, The Versatile Burl Ives! (1961)
- Chad Mitchell Trio, At the Bitter End (1962)
- Odetta, under the title "Roberta," Odetta Sings Folk Songs (1963)
- Valentine Pringle, I Hear America Singing (1963)
- Pernell Roberts, Come All Ye Fair and Tender Ladies (1963)
- Blues Project, Live at The Cafe Au Go Go (1966, recorded live 1965)
- Doc Watson, Southbound (1966)
- Actor Kiel Martin played a soulful version of this song in the Season 6 episode entitled "Hell Wind" of the American Western TV series The Virginian, accompanying himself on acoustic guitar, in 1968. Aside from this television episode, the performance remains unreleased on music media.
- Bob Dylan, two versions, Self Portrait (1970)
- An unrelated song, Corrine, Corrina, was sung by Eric Clapton with the lyrics changed to Albera, Alberta.
