= Self Portrait (Bob Dylan album) =

Studio album by Bob Dylan
- Released: June 8, 1970
- Recorded: April 24, 1969 – March 30, 1970
- Genres: Folk rock; blues rock; country rock
- Length: 73:15
- Label: Columbia
- Producer: Bob Johnston

Bob Dylan chronology
Nashville Skyline (1969)	Self Portrait (1970)	New Morning (1970)

Singles from Self Portrait
- 1. "Wigwam" Released: March 1970

Self Portrait is the tenth studio album by American singer-songwriter Bob Dylan. It was released on June 8, 1970, through Columbia Records. The album was produced by Bob Johnston and was Dylan's second double album, after Blonde on Blonde (1966). The record is compiled of cover songs, live recordings, and new originals, while the arrangements and vocal performances continue in the country vein of the preceding Nashville Skyline (1969).

Self Portrait was released to negative reviews and confusion from critics and fans alike. Criticism was directed at the album's production, performances, and the lack of new material. Dylan himself has since referred to the album as having been released with the purpose of confounding the public's expectations of him, and to counter the "spokesman of a generation" tag which had been placed on him throughout the 1960s.

Despite the critical reception, the album was a commercial success, reaching number four in the US and topping the chart in the UK. In 2013, Dylan released The Bootleg Series Vol. 10: Another Self Portrait (1969–1971), which resulted in further positive critical revaluation.

== Production ==
The motives behind Self Portrait have been subject to wild speculation and great debate.

Critic Robert Shelton was under the impression that Self Portrait was intended as a serious release. "I told Dylan that Self Portrait confused me," Shelton wrote in 1986. "Why had he recorded 'Blue Moon'? He wouldn't be drawn out, although obviously he had been stung by the criticism. 'It was an expression,' he said. He indicated that if the album had come from Presley or the Everly Brothers, who veered toward the middle of the road, it wouldn't have shocked so many."

However, in a Rolling Stone interview, in 1984, Dylan gave a different reason for the album's release:

At the time, I was in Woodstock, and I was getting a great degree of notoriety for doing nothing. Then I had that motorcycle accident [in 1966], which put me outta commission. Then, when I woke up and caught my senses, I realized that I was just workin' for all these leeches. And I didn't wanna do that. Plus, I had a family, and I just wanted to see my kids. I'd also seen that I was representing all these things that I didn't know anything about.

[. . .]

This was just about the time of that Woodstock festival, which was the sum total of all this bullshit. And it seemed to have something to do with me, this Woodstock Nation, and everything it represented. So we couldn't breathe. I couldn't get any space for myself and my family, and there was no help, nowhere. I got very resentful about the whole thing, and we got outta there. We moved to New York.

[. . . ] There'd be crowds outside my house. And I said, “Well, fuck it. I wish these people would just forget about me. I wanna do something they can't possibly like, they can't relate to. They'll see it, and they'll listen, and they'll say, 'Well, let's go on to the next person. He ain't sayin' it no more. He ain't givin' us what we want,' you know? They'll go on to somebody else,"

But the whole idea backfired because the album went out there, and the people said, "This ain't what we want," and they got more resentful. And then I did this portrait for the cover. I mean, there was no title for that album. I knew somebody who had some paints and a square canvas, and I did the cover up in about five minutes. And I said, "Well, I'm gonna call this album Self Portrait."

[Rolling Stone:] Which was duly interpreted by the press as: This is what he is...

Yeah, exactly. And to me, it was a joke.

As to why he chose to release a double album, Dylan replied, "Well, it wouldn't have held up as a single album–then it really would've been bad, you know. I mean, if you're gonna put a lot of crap on it, you might as well load it up!"

Later, Cameron Crowe interviewed Dylan for his liner notes to 1985's Biograph, a boxed-set retrospective of Dylan's career. When asked about Self Portrait, Dylan added more details to the story:

Self Portrait was a bunch of tracks that we'd done all the time I'd gone to Nashville. We did that stuff to get a [studio] sound. To open up we'd do two or three songs, just to get things right and then we'd go on and do what we were going to do. And then there was a lot of other stuff that was just on the shelf. But I was being bootlegged at the time and a lot of stuff that was worse was appearing on bootleg records. So I just figured I'd put all this stuff together and put it out, my own bootleg record, so to speak. You know, if it actually had been a bootleg record, people probably would have sneaked around to buy it and played it for each other secretly. Also, I wasn't going to be anybody's puppet and I figured this record would put an end to that...I was just so fed up with all that 'who people thought I was' nonsense.

Later interviews only echoed the sentiments expressed to Crowe.

== Songs ==
Certain tracks have drawn praise over the years. One of them is written by Alfred Frank Beddoe (who was "discovered" by Pete Seeger after applying for work at People's Songs, Inc. in 1946), "Copper Kettle" captures an idyllic backwoods existence, where moonshine is equated not only with pleasure but with tax resistance. Appalachian farmers who struggled to make their living off the land would routinely siphon off a percentage of their corn in order to distill whiskey. Everything produced would then be hidden from the government in order to avoid the whiskey tax of 1791.

Clinton Heylin writes, "'Copper Kettle'...strike[s] all the right chords...being one of the most affecting performances in Dylan's entire official canon." Music critic Tim Riley called it "an ingenious Appalachian zygote for rock attitudes, the hidden source of John Wesley Harding's shadows."

"Copper Kettle" was popularised by Joan Baez and appeared on her best-selling 1962 LP Joan Baez in Concert.

Among the original songs written for the album, the instrumental "Wigwam" later achieved recognition for its use in the 2001 Wes Anderson film The Royal Tenenbaums. "Living the Blues" was later covered by Leon Redbone. "Living the Blues" was also covered by the Jamie Saft Trio with Anohni on the album Trouble: The Jamie Saft Trio Plays Bob Dylan, in 2006. "All the Tired Horses" only features two lines, and is sung by Hilda Harris, Albertine Robinson, and Maeretha Stewart. The song featured in the 2001 film Blow.

One of the live songs on the album is the party-friendly romp "The Mighty Quinn (Quinn the Eskimo)", originally recorded at the 1967 Basement Tapes sessions and covered to great success by Manfred Mann in 1968. For live venues, the Grateful Dead and Phish made the song an iconic favorite. The version on Self Portrait, however, is a soundboard-sourced live performance from Dylan and the Band's Isle of Wight Festival concert (as are three other tracks on the album).

== Reception ==
Professional ratings
Review scores
Source	Rating
AllMusic	2/5 stars
The Encyclopedia of Popular Music	1/5 stars
Entertainment Weekly	C−
MusicHound Rock	2/5
The Rolling Stone Album Guide	1/5 stars
Tom Hull	C
The Village Voice	C+

Self Portrait received negative reviews by critics and consumers alike. Critical disdain seemed universal. At best, a number of journalists, including Robert Christgau, felt there was a concept behind Self Portrait that had some merit.

"Conceptually, this is a brilliant album," wrote Christgau, "which is organized, I think, by two central ideas. First, that 'self' is most accurately defined (and depicted) in terms of the artifacts—in this case, pop tunes and folk songs claimed as personal property and semispontaneous renderings of past creations frozen for posterity on a piece of tape and (perhaps) even a couple of songs one has written oneself—to which one responds. Second, that the people's music is the music people like, Mantovani strings and all."

However, few critics expressed any interest in the music itself. "[I]n order for a concept to work it has to be supported musically—that is, you have to listen," Christgau admitted. "I don't know anyone, even vociferous supporters of this album, who plays more than one side at a time. I don't listen to it at all. The singing is not consistently good, though it has its moments, and the production—for which I blame Bob Johnston, though Dylan has to be listed as a coconspirator—ranges from indifferent to awful. It is possible to use strings and soprano choruses well, but Johnston has never demonstrated the knack. Other points: it's overpriced, the cover art is lousy, and it sounds good on WMCA."

In his Rolling Stone review Greil Marcus used a memorably vitriolic opening line: "What is this shit?" Additionally, Marcus wrote, "Unless [Dylan] returns to the marketplace, with a sense of vocation and the ambition to keep up with his own gifts, the music of [the mid-sixties] will continue to dominate his records, whether he releases them or not." He also commented, "I once said I'd buy an album of Dylan breathing heavily. I still would. But not an album of Dylan breathing softly." In a 1971 telephone interview with journalist A.J. Weberman, Dylan can be heard responding angrily to the Marcus review, while attempting to defend larger accusations of perceived non-committal politics.

A rare dissenting positive voice about the album was English musician Marc Bolan. Appalled at the negative reviews directed at the album, Bolan wrote a letter in its defence to the 11 July 1970 edition of Melody Maker:

I've just listened to Dylan's new album, and in particular "Belle Isle", and I feel deeply moved that such a man is making music in my time.
Dylan's songs are now mainly love ballads, the writing of which is one of the most poetic art forms since the dawn of man.
"Belle Isle" brought to my memory all the moments of tenderness I've ever felt for another human being, and that, within the superficial landscape of pop music, is a great thing indeed.
Please, all the people who write bitterly of a lost star, remember that with maturity comes change, as surely as death follows life.

Rock critics Jimmy Guterman and Owen O'Donnell, in their 1991 book The Worst Rock and Roll Records of All Time, listed Self-Portrait as the third worst rock album ever, with only Lou Reed's experimental Metal Machine Music and Elvis Presley's concert byplay album Having Fun with Elvis on Stage faring worse. "The breakup of the Beatles shortly before this album's release," they wrote, "signaled the end of the sixties; Self-Portrait suggested the end of Bob Dylan."

In 1973, Knopf published Dylan's song lyrics, sketches, and album notes as Writings and Drawings, with updated versions called Lyrics appearing in 1985 and 2000. In all three editions, the original lyrics from Self Portrait are never acknowledged, suggesting Dylan's disavowal of the whole album to that time. However, the lyrics to "Living the Blues" and "Minstrel Boy" are included, listed as extra songs from the Nashville Skyline sessions; the 2004 edition includes them under their own entry and Dylan's current website includes the release together with lyrics and download links.

Dylan revisited Self Portrait on The Bootleg Series Vol. 10: Another Self Portrait (1969–1971) in 2013.

== Track listing ==
Side one
No.	Title	Writer(s)	Recorded	Length
1.	"All the Tired Horses"	Bob Dylan	March 5, 1970; March 11, 17 & 30, 1970 (overdubs)	3:12
2.	"Alberta #1"	Traditional	March 5, 1970; March 11 & April 3, 1970 (overdubs)	2:57
3.	"I Forgot More Than You'll Ever Know"	Cecil A. Null	April 26, 1969	2:23
4.	"Days of '49"	Alan Lomax, John Lomax, Frank Warner	March 4, 1970; March 11, 1970 (overdubs)	5:27
5.	"Early Mornin' Rain"	Gordon Lightfoot	March 4, 1970; March 13 & 17, 1970 (overdubs)	3:34
6.	"In Search of Little Sadie"	Traditional	March 3, 1970; March 11 & April 2, 1970 (overdubs)	2:28
Total length:				20:01

Side two
No.	Title	Writer(s)	Recorded	Length
1.	"Let It Be Me"	Gilbert Bécaud, Mann Curtis, Pierre Delanoë	April 26, 1969	3:00
2.	"Little Sadie"	Traditional	March 3, 1970; March 11 & April 2, 1970 (overdubs)	2:00
3.	"Woogie Boogie"	Dylan	March 3, 1970; March 13 & 17, 1970 (overdubs)	2:06
4.	"Belle Isle"	Traditional	March 3, 1970; March 12, 17 & 30, 1970 (overdubs)	2:30
5.	"Living the Blues"	Dylan	April 24, 1969	2:42
6.	"Like a Rolling Stone"	Dylan	August 31, 1969 (Note: Live performance from the Isle of Wight festival.)	5:18
Total length:				17:36

Side three
No.	Title	Writer(s)	Recorded	Length
1.	"Copper Kettle"	Albert Frank Beddoe	March 3, 1970; March 13, 17 & 30, 1970 (overdubs)	3:34
2.	"Gotta Travel On"	Paul Clayton, Larry Ehrlich, David Lazar, Tom Six	March 5, 1970; March 13, 1970 (overdubs)	3:08
3.	"Blue Moon"	Lorenz Hart, Richard Rodgers	May 3, 1969	2:29
4.	"The Boxer"	Paul Simon	March 3, 1970; March 12 & April 2, 1970 (overdubs)	2:48
5.	"The Mighty Quinn (Quinn the Eskimo)"	Dylan	August 31, 1969	2:48
6.	"Take Me as I Am (Or Let Me Go)"	Boudleaux Bryant	April 26, 1969	3:03
Total length:				17:50

Side four
No.	Title	Writer(s)	Recorded	Length
1.	"Take a Message to Mary"	Felice Bryant, Boudleaux Bryant	May 3, 1969	2:46
2.	"It Hurts Me Too"	Traditional	March 3, 1970	3:15
3.	"Minstrel Boy"	Dylan	August 31, 1969	3:33
4.	"She Belongs to Me"	Dylan	August 31, 1969	2:44
5.	"Wigwam"	Dylan	March 4, 1970; March 17, 1970 (overdubs)	3:09
6.	"Alberta #2"	Traditional	March 5, 1970; March 11 & April 3, 1970 (overdubs)	3:12
Total length:				18:39

Notes:

- The album notes credit "Alberta #1", "In Search of Little Sadie", "Little Sadie", "Belle Isle", "It Hurts Me Too", and "Alberta #2" to Dylan.
- "Like a Rolling Stone", "Quinn the Eskimo (The Mighty Quinn)", "Minstrel Boy", and "She Belongs to Me" were recorded at the Isle of Wight Festival on August 31, 1969.

== Personnel ==
All sessions

- Bob Dylan – vocals, guitar, harmonica, keyboards

April 24, 26 & May 3, 1969 sessions (Nashville)

- Norman Blake – guitar (April 26, May 3)
- Kenneth A. Buttrey – drums, percussion
- Fred Carter Jr. – guitar
- Charlie Daniels – guitar
- Pete Drake – steel guitar
- Doug Kershaw – violin (May 3)
- Charlie McCoy – bass guitar
- Robert S. Wilson – piano

Aug 31, 1969 Isle of Wight Festival live recording

- Rick Danko – bass guitar, vocals
- Levon Helm – drums, mandolin, vocals
- Garth Hudson – keyboards
- Richard Manuel – piano, vocals
- Robbie Robertson – guitar, vocals

March 3–5, 1970 session (New York City)

- David Bromberg – guitar, Dobro, bass guitar
- Emanuel Green – violin
- Al Kooper – keyboards, guitar
- Hilda Harris – vocals (March 5)
- Albertine Robinson – vocals (March 5)
- Alvin Rogers – drums (March 4–5)
- Maeretha Stewart – vocals (March 5)
- Stu Woods – bass guitar (March 4–5)

March 11–13, 1970 overdub sessions (Nashville)

- Kenneth A. Buttrey – drums (March 11-12); bongos & congos (March 13)
- Fred Carter Jr. – electric guitar (March 12)
- Bob Moore – bass guitar (March 11)
- Charlie McCoy – guitar (March 11); upright bass & harmonica (March 13)

March 17, 1970 overdub session (Nashville)

- Byron Bach – cello
- Brenton Banks – violin
- George Binkley III – violin
- Marvin Chantry – viola
- Ron Cornelius – guitar
- Dolores Edgin – vocals
- Solie Fott – violin, viola
- Bubba Fowler – guitar
- Dennis Good – trombone
- Karl Himmel – clarinet, saxophone, trombone
- Lilian Hunt – violin
- Martin Katahn – violin
- Sheldon Kurland – violin
- Martha McCrory – cello
- Barry McDonald – violin
- Carol Montgomery – vocals
- Gene A. Mullins – baritone horn
- June Page – vocals
- Rex Peer – trombone
- Bill Pursell – piano
- Frank C. Smith – trombone
- Gary Van Osdale – viola
- Bill Walker – leader and arranger

March 26, 1970 overdub session (Hollywood, CA)

- Freddie Hill – trumpet
- Joe Osborn – guitar, bass guitar
- Tony Terran – trumpet
- Ollie Mitchell – trumpet

March 30, April 2–3, 1970 overdub sessions (Nashville)

- Albert Wynn Butler – clarinet, saxophone (April 3)
- Kenneth A. Buttrey – drums (April 2)
- Charlie Daniels – guitar (March 30, April 3)
- Karl Himmel – clarinet, saxophone, trombone (March 30)
- Charlie McCoy – guitar, vibes (April 2)
- Bob Moore – bass guitar (March 30)

Technical

- Don Puluse, Glyn Johns, Neil Wilburn – engineer
- Ron Coro – design
- Al Clayton, John Cohen, Camera Press – photography
- Bob Dylan – cover painting

== Charts ==
=== Weekly charts ===
Year	Chart	Position
1970	Billboard 200	4
1970	Record World Album Chart	1
1970	Cash Box Album Chart	1
1970	Spanish Albums Chart	3
1970	UK Top 75	1

=== Singles ===
Year	Single	Chart	Position
1970	"Wigwam"	Billboard Hot 100	41

== Certifications ==
Region	Certification	Certified units/sales
United States (RIAA)	Gold	500,000^{^}
^{^} Shipments figures based on certification alone.
