= I Threw It All Away =

1969 song by Bob Dylan

Single by Bob Dylan

from the album Nashville Skyline
- B-side: "Drifter's Escape"
- Released: April 9, 1969
- Recorded: February 13, 1969
- Studio: Columbia Studio A (Nashville, Tennessee)
- Genre: Country; country rock
- Length: 2:23
- Label: Columbia
- Songwriter: Bob Dylan
- Producer: Bob Johnston

Bob Dylan singles chronology
"All Along the Watchtower" (1968)	"I Threw It All Away" (1969)	"Lay Lady Lay" (1969)

"I Threw It All Away" is a song by American singer-songwriter Bob Dylan. The track appeared on Dylan's album Nashville Skyline in 1969, and was released as its first single later that year, where it reached number 85 on the Billboard Hot 100, and number 30 on the UK Singles Chart. It is considered to be one of the best and most popular songs on the album.

== Music and lyrics ==
"I Threw It All Away" was one of the first songs written for Nashville Skyline and one of only two new songs that were definitely written prior to the recording sessions ("Lay Lady Lay" being the other). Dylan played the song for George Harrison and his wife Pattie in November 1968, and Harrison was apparently impressed enough with the song to learn it himself. It was the second song recorded for Nashville Skyline, after "To Be Alone with You", on February 13, 1969.

Dylan is singing about a love that he has lost by being cruel and angry. There has been some speculation on whom Dylan is referring to in the song. Many have speculated that it could be about a number of women including Suze Rotolo, Joan Baez, and Edie Sedgwick.

Unlike many songs Dylan wrote about failed relationships, such as "Don't Think Twice, It's All Right", "It Ain't Me, Babe" and "One of Us Must Know (Sooner or Later)", Dylan takes responsibility for the failure in this song. The song has also been interpreted as a portrait of Dylan's muse.

=== Personnel ===
- Bob Dylan - guitar, vocals
- Kenneth A. Buttrey - drums
- Charlie Daniels - bass guitar
- Bob Wilson - organ

== Critical reception and legacy ==
Cash Box described it as "a love song bristling with tenderness of a masculine sort." Record World said it was "pretty."

Australian singer-songwriter Nick Cave cited it in a 1995 interview as the one song he "wished he had written".

In a 2005 poll reported in Mojo, "I Threw It All Away" was listed as the #55 all-time Bob Dylan song. In 2002, Uncut listed "I Threw It All Away" as the #34 all-time Bob Dylan song.

Benjamin Booker and Laura Marling both cited it as their favorite Dylan song in a 2021 Stereogum article. Booker wrote, "I rarely get a glimpse of the man behind the songs. But, on 'I Threw It All Away' I think he’s looking us straight in the eye. That’s why I love this song. The notorious Casanova who threw everything he had into becoming a legend had made it, but not without regrets". Marling noted, "It just feels like he opens up and shows this super vulnerable side and lets his voice soar like I haven’t really heard before. And it’s so sincere. I’d give him another chance if I was the one he was singing to, that’s for sure".

== Live performances ==
Dylan performed "I Threw It All Away" live for the first time on The Johnny Cash Show, broadcast on June 7, 1969. It was the second song in Dylan's set with The Band at the Isle of Wight Festival on August 31, 1969 and is included on Isle of Wight Live, part of the 4-CD deluxe edition of The Bootleg Series Vol. 10: Another Self Portrait (1969–1971), released in 2013. (Another song from Nashville Skyline, "Lay Lady Lay", was also in Dylan's Isle of Wight set.)

Dylan performed "I Threw It All Away" in the spring of 1976 during the Rolling Thunder Revue. The May 16, 1976 performance would later be included on the live album Hard Rain. The Rolling Thunder rendition of the song was a raging rock song with strident lyrics, in contrast to the original version.

Dylan also played the song on his 1978 tour, but did not play it again live until 1998 during his Never Ending Tour. By 2002, the date of its final performances on the Never Ending Tour, Dylan was playing an acoustic version of the song. According to his official website, Dylan played the song a total of 48 times in concert.

== Cover versions ==
- Cher, on the 1969 album 3614 Jackson Highway
- The Beatles (George Harrison), during the Let It Be sessions. Harrison also recorded a version of "Mama, You Been on My Mind" in the same medley.
- Elvis Costello, on the 1995 album Kojak Variety
- Scott Walker, on the 1996 Australian film soundtrack To Have & to Hold
- Prairie Oyster, on the 2006 album One Kiss
- Yo La Tengo, on the 1989 album President Yo La Tengo
