= Copper Kettle =

Song composed by Albert Frank Beddoe and made popular by Joan Baez

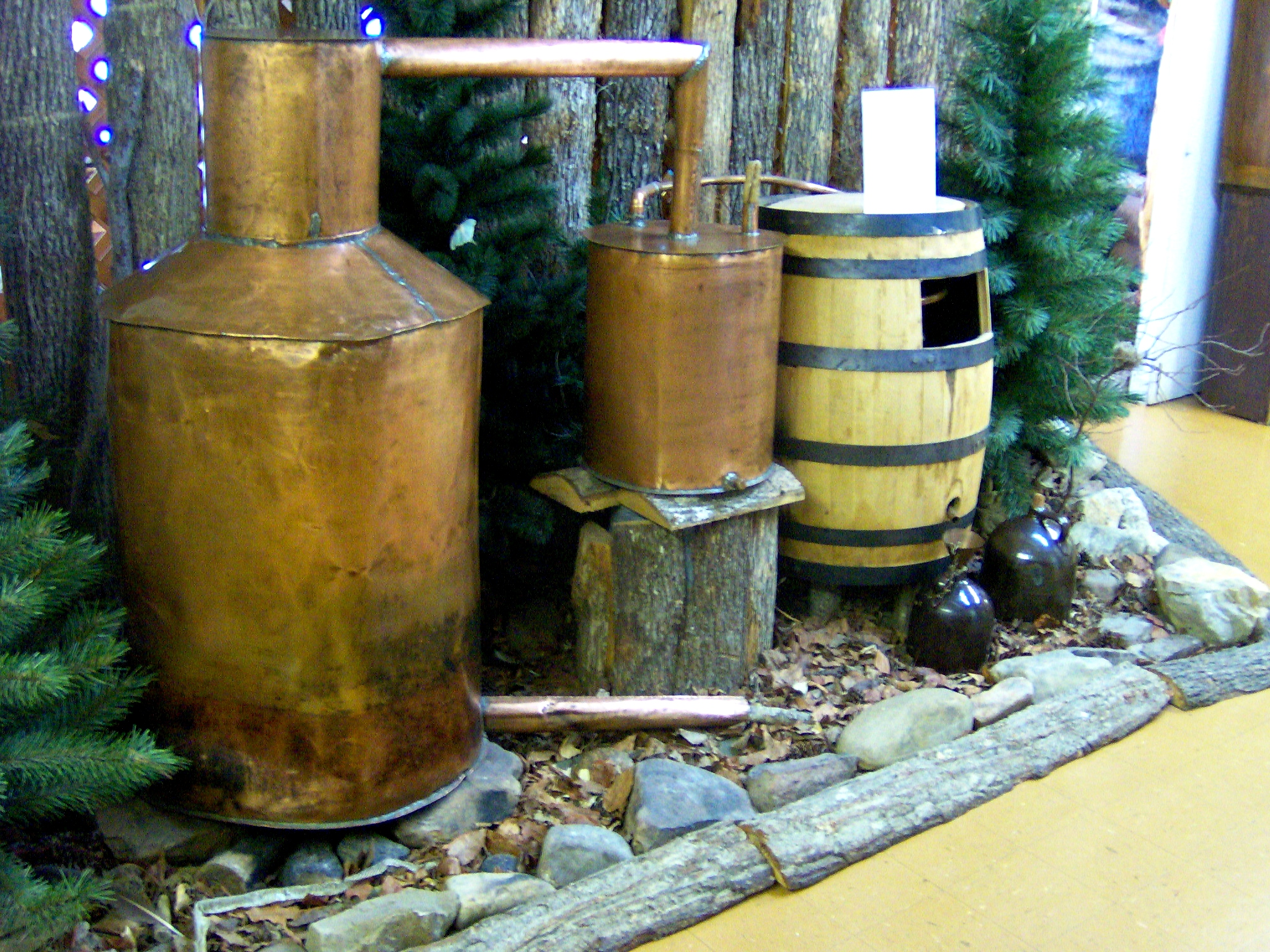
A copper kettle type of moonshine still

"Copper Kettle" (also known as "Get you a Copper Kettle", "In the pale moonlight") is a song composed by Albert Frank Beddoe and made popular by Joan Baez. Pete Seeger's account dates the song to 1946, mentioning its probable folk origin, while in a 1962 Time readers column A. F. Beddoe says that the song was written by him in 1953 as part of the folk opera Go Lightly, Stranger. The song praises the good aspects of moonshining as told to the listener by a man whose "daddy made whiskey, and granddaddy did too". The line "We ain't paid no whiskey tax since 1792" alludes to an unpopular tax imposed in 1791 by the fledgling U.S. federal government. The levy provoked the Whiskey Rebellion and generally had a short life, barely lasting until 1803. Enjoyable lyrics and simple melody turned "Copper Kettle" into a popular folk song.

== Performed by ==
- Joan Baez, recorded in Joan Baez in Concert, 1962
- Two Tones (a duet including Gordon Lightfoot), on the album Two Tones at the Village Corner, 1962
- The Country Gentlemen, recorded for Starday Records, 1963
- Chet Atkins, Guitar Country, 1964; and in various live settings
- Bob Dylan, on the album Self Portrait, 1970, and Another Self Portrait, 2013
- Tony Joe White, on the album Tony Joe White, 1971
- Damnations TX on the album Live Set recorded in Austin, TX in 1996
- Devendra Banhart in live concert
- Jump, Little Children, on the album Live at the Dock Street Theatre, 2006
- Gillian Welch and David Rawlings in live concert
- Robyn Hitchcock, live at Borders Books, 2004
- Kreuzberg Museum, on the album Ten American Classics, 2006
- Jack Dallas, David Beddoe, live performance of the musical "Copper Kettle" (formerly "Go Lightly, Stranger") at the NYC Music Marathon, Dramatists Guild, NYC April 16, 2012
- Old Blind Dogs
- Bobby Womack, recorded in Lookin' for a Love Again, 1974
- Joni Mitchell, recorded ca. 1963 and released on the album Joni Mitchell Archives – Vol. 1: The Early Years (1963–1967), 2020
- Jake Xerxes Fussell, single released by Paradise of Bachelors, 2021
- Tommy Emmanuel with Rob Ickes and Trey Hensley, 2021
- The A's (Alexandra Sauser-Monnig and Amelia Meath), on the album Fruit, 2022
- Mary Black, on the 30th anniversary reissue of her album By the Time It Gets Dark
- Nora Brown and Stephanie Coleman on the EP, Lady of the Lake, 2023.

== See also ==
- Moonshining
