= Nashville Skyline =

Studio album by Bob Dylan
- Released: April 9, 1969
- Recorded: February 13–18, 1969
- Studio: Columbia Studio A (Nashville, Tennessee)
- Genre: Country; country folk; country rock
- Length: 26:46
- Label: Columbia
- Producer: Bob Johnston

Bob Dylan chronology
John Wesley Harding (1967)	Nashville Skyline (1969)	Self Portrait (1970)

Singles from Nashville Skyline
- 1. "I Threw It All Away" Released: May 1969; 2. "Lay Lady Lay" / "Peggy Day" Released: July 1969; 3. "Tonight I'll Be Staying Here with You" / "Country Pie" Released: October 1969

Nashville Skyline is the ninth studio album by the American singer-songwriter Bob Dylan, released on April 9, 1969, by Columbia Records as LP record, reel-to-reel tape, and audio cassette.

Building on the rustic style he experimented with on John Wesley Harding, Nashville Skyline displayed a complete immersion into country music. Along with the more basic lyrical themes, simple songwriting structures, and charming domestic feel, it introduced audiences to a radically new singing voice from Dylan, who had temporarily quit smoking—a soft, affected country croon.

The result received a generally positive reaction from critics, and was a commercial success. The album scored Dylan his fourth UK No. 1 album and reached No. 3 in the U.S.

== Background ==
The concept of recording a country album in Nashville was first discussed with Dylan in 1965 by Johnny Cash, who expressed interest in producing such an album. "I've got my own ideas about that Nashville sound and I'd like to try it with Bob," Cash said in a March 1965 interview with Music Business magazine. Those sessions did not end up materializing until 1969 and by June of 1965, Dylan was going fully electric with the recording of Highway 61 Revisited. By the time Nashville Skyline was recorded, the political climate in the United States had grown more polarized. In 1968, civil rights leader Martin Luther King Jr. and Senator Robert F. Kennedy (a leading candidate for the presidency) were assassinated. Riots related to the Vietnam War and civil rights broke out in most large American cities. A major one surrounding the Democratic National Convention in Chicago and racially motivated conflagrations spurred by King's assassination marked this period. A new president, Richard Nixon, was sworn into office in January 1969, but the U.S. engagement in Southeast Asia, particularly the Vietnam War, would continue for several years. Protests over a wide range of political topics became more frequent. Dylan had been a leading cultural figure, noted for political and social commentary throughout the 1960s. Even as he moved away from topical songs, he never lost his cultural stature. However, as Clinton Heylin wrote of Nashville Skyline, "If Dylan was concerned about retaining a hold on the rock constituency, making albums with Johnny Cash in Nashville was tantamount to abdication in many eyes."

"Our generation owes him our artistic lives," observed Kris Kristofferson, who later sang with Cash in The Highwaymen, "because he opened all the doors in Nashville when he did Blonde on Blonde and Nashville Skyline. The country scene was so conservative until he arrived. He brought in a whole new audience. He changed the way people thought about it – even the Grand Ole Opry was never the same again."

Helped by a promotional appearance on The Johnny Cash Show on June 7, Nashville Skyline went on to become one of Dylan's best-selling albums. Three singles were pulled from it, all of which received significant airplay on AM radio.

== Critical reception and legacy ==
Retrospective professional reviews
Review scores
Source	Rating
AllMusic	5/5 stars
Chicago Tribune	3/4 stars
The Encyclopedia of Popular Music	4/5 stars
MusicHound Rock	3.5/5
Paste	10/10
The Rolling Stone Album Guide	4/5 stars
Tom Hull	A−

Despite the dramatic commercial shift in direction, the press also gave Nashville Skyline a warm reception. A critic for Newsweek wrote of "the great charm... and the ways Dylan, both as composer and performer, has found to exploit subtle differences on a deliberately limited emotional and verbal scale." In Rolling Stone, Paul Nelson wrote, "Nashville Skyline achieves the artistically impossible: a deep, humane, and interesting statement about being happy. It could well be... his best album." However, Nelson would reconsider his opinion in a review for Bob Dylan's Greatest Hits Vol. II less than three years later, writing, "I was misinformed. That's why no one should pay any attention to critics, especially the artist." In The Village Voice, Robert Christgau argued that "the beauty of the album" was in the "totally undemanding" and "one-dimensional" quality of the songs, believing Dylan had toyed with the public's expectations again by embracing a country tenor voice and aesthetic. He later included it in his "Basic Record Library" of 1950s and 1960s recordings, published in Christgau's Record Guide: Rock Albums of the Seventies (1981). It was voted number 579 in the third edition of Colin Larkin's All Time Top 1000 Albums (2000).

A few critics expressed some disappointment. Ed Ochs of Billboard wrote, "the satisfied man speaks in clichés, and blushes as if every day were Valentine's Day." Tim Souster of the BBC's The Listener magazine wrote, "One can't help feeling something is missing. Isn't this idyllic country landscape too good to be true?"

Hip hop group Public Enemy reference it in their 2007 Dylan tribute song "Long and Whining Road": "Fans, if it's not for you, there'd be no PE / From the Nashville Skyline, to the homeboys and girls of South Country".

== Track listing ==
All tracks are written by Bob Dylan.

Side one
No.	Title	Recorded	Length
1.	"Girl from the North Country" (duet with Johnny Cash)	February 18, 1969	3:41
2.	"Nashville Skyline Rag"	February 17, 1969	3:12
3.	"To Be Alone with You"	February 13, 1969	2:07
4.	"I Threw It All Away"	February 13, 1969	2:23
5.	"Peggy Day"	February 14, 1969	2:01
Total length:			13:24

Side two
No.	Title	Recorded	Length
1.	"Lay Lady Lay"	February 14, 1969	3:18
2.	"One More Night"	February 13, 1969	2:23
3.	"Tell Me That It Isn't True"	February 14, 1969	2:41
4.	"Country Pie"	February 14, 1969	1:37
5.	"Tonight I'll Be Staying Here with You"	February 17, 1969	3:23
Total length:			13:22

== Personnel ==
=== Musicians ===
- Bob Dylan – vocals, guitar, harmonica
- Norman Blake – guitar, Dobro
- Fred Carter Jr. – guitar
- Charlie McCoy – guitar, harmonica
- Pete Drake – pedal steel guitar
- Charlie Daniels – bass guitar, guitar
- Bob Wilson – organ, piano
- Kenneth A. Buttrey – drums, bongos, cowbell

=== Additional musicians ===
- Johnny Cash – vocals and guitar on "Girl from the North Country"
- Bob Wootton – electric guitar on "Girl from the North Country"
- Marshall Grant – bass guitar on "Girl from the North Country"
- W. S. Holland – drums on "Girl from the North Country"

=== Production ===
- Bob Johnston – production
- Charlie Bragg – engineering
- Neil Wilburn – engineering
- Elliot Landy – photographer front cover
- Al Clayton – photographer back cover

== Charts ==
=== Weekly charts ===
Year	Chart	Peak position
1969	US Billboard Top LP's	3
1969	US Cashbox Top 100 Albums	3
1969	US Record World 100 Top LP's	1
1969	Spanish Albums Chart	4
1969	UK Record Retailer Top 75	1

=== Singles ===
Single	Year	Chart	Peak position
"I Threw It All Away"	1969	Billboard Hot 100	85
"I Threw It All Away"	1969	UK Top 100	30
"Lay Lady Lay"	1969	Billboard Hot 100	7
"Lay Lady Lay"	1969	UK Top 75	5
"Tonight I'll Be Staying Here with You"	1969	Billboard Hot 100	50

== Certifications ==
Region	Certification	Certified units/sales
Canada (Music Canada)	Gold	50,000^{^}
United Kingdom (BPI) 2004 release	Gold	100,000^{^}
United States (RIAA)	Platinum	1,000,000
^{^} Shipments figures based on certification alone.
