= Bob Wilson (keyboardist) =

American musician

Bob Wilson is an American keyboardist, arranger, songwriter and record producer. As a session player, Wilson recorded with many recording artists including Bob Dylan, J.J. Cale, Charlie Daniels, Dolly Parton, Earl Scruggs and The Earl Scruggs Revue, Slim Harpo, Graham Bell, Carol Grimes, Fenton Robinson, Esther Phillips, and Joe Simon. He is best known for his contributions as a keyboardist on Dylan's Nashville Skyline and Self Portrait albums and as a Nashville-based "session man." As a primary artist he has released "All Turned On," "In The Midnight Hour", "Suzy's Serenade" and "After Hours." Wilson's single "All Turned On" is the title track for the 2022 Ace Records/Motown Records compilation album, All Turned On! (Motown Instrumentals 1960–1972).

== Career ==
Bob Wilson grew up in Adrian, Michigan, and got his start in the music business in Detroit. He released his first single , "All Turned On" as Bob Wilson and the San Remo Quartet on Ric-Tic Records in 1965 as B-side of "Hungry for Love" by the San Remo Golden Strings. He later moved to Nashville and met with John R. of the blues & soul AM radio station, WLAC who gave him a job playing in a Joe Simon session and convinced him to work with Sound Stage 7 Records in the in-house band the "Music City Four". After working as a session musician in Nashville he got a gig working with Dylan on his Nashville Skyline album. Wilson played alongside Charlie Daniels on Nashville Skyline and they became frequent collaborators including on Dylan's Self Portrait album and Daniels' debut album, Charlie Daniels.
