= The Best of the Band, Vol. II =

Greatest hits album by the Band
- Released: October 5, 1999
- Recorded: January 1986 – May 1998
- Genre: Rock
- Length: 47:34
- Label: Rhino
- Producers: John Simon, Aaron Hurwitz

The Band chronology
Jubilation (1998)	The Best of the Band, Vol. II (1999)	Greatest Hits (2000)

Professional ratings
Review scores
Source	Rating
AllMusic	3/5 stars
Robert Christgau	(1-star Honorable Mention)

The Best of the Band, Vol. II is the second volume of greatest hits by the Band, released in October 1999 on Rhino Records. It collects eleven tracks from the group's final three studio albums (Jericho, High on the Hog and Jubilation). One track, "Young Blood", had previously been available in the United States only on a tribute album to Doc Pomus; it appeared on British and Japanese pressings of 1996's High on the Hog. The last track, "She Knows", is a live track sung by Manuel.

== Track listing ==
The Best of the Band, Vol. II track listing
No.	Title	Writer(s)	Lead vocals	Length
1.	"Stand Up" (from High on the Hog, 1996)	Bruce Channel; Sonny Throckmorton; Ricky Ray Rector	Levon Helm	3:04
2.	"Remedy" (from Jericho, 1993)	Colin Linden; Jim Weider	Helm	4:21
3.	"Back to Memphis" (from High on the Hog)	Johnnie Johnson; Anthony Kenney; Mark Orr; Greg Martin; Fred Young; Richard Young	Helm with Rick Danko	5:09
4.	"Blind Willie McTell" (from Jericho)	Bob Dylan	Danko; Helm	6:37
5.	"Atlantic City" (from Jericho)	Bruce Springsteen	Helm	4:53
6.	"Forever Young" (from High on the Hog)	Dylan	Danko; Randy Ciarlante; Helm	6:27
7.	"Young Blood" (from European and Japanese editions of High on the Hog)	Jerry Leiber; Mike Stoller; Doc Pomus	Helm	3:21
8.	"Stuff You Gotta Watch" (from Jericho)	Muddy Waters	Helm	2:47
9.	"White Cadillac" (from Jubilation, 1998)	Ciarlante; Weider; Helm	Ciarlante	3:37
10.	"The High Price of Love" (from High on the Hog)	Jules Shear; Stan Szelest	Helm with Danko	5:58
11.	"She Knows" (from High on the Hog)	Jimmy Griffin; Robb Royer	Richard Manuel	3:21
