= The Weight Band =

American rock band

The Weight Band is an American rock band formed in 2013. It consists of Jim Weider (guitar), Michael Bram (drums, vocals), Brian Mitchell (keyboards, vocals), Matt Zeiner (keyboard, vocals) and Albert Rogers (bass, vocals). The Weight Band was created by Jim Weider to continue the musical legacy of The Band.

== History ==
The Weight Band originated inside the barn of Levon Helm Studios in 2013 when Jim Weider and Randy Ciarlante, both former members of The Band, were performing “Songs of The Band” with Garth Hudson, Jimmy Vivino and Byron Isaacs. Weider, Ciarlante and Isaacs continued performing songs from The Band and invited Brian Mitchell. Marty Grebb, who contributed to The Band albums Jericho and Jubilation, was also invited to join The Weight Band. The Weight Band later added Albert Rogers (2016) and Michael Bram from Jason Mraz's band (2017) and Matt Zeiner from Dickey Betts' band(2018).

In 2015, Jim Weider started Camp Cripple Creek with The Weight Band. Camp Cripple Creek is a celebration of The Band’s music. The first Camp Cripple Creek event was at Levon Helm Studios, with subsequent annual Camp Cripple Creek events at Full Moon Resort in Big Indian, New York. Camp Cripple Creek guest artists have included Jackie Greene, Larry Campbell (musician), Paul Barrere & Fred Tackett, David Bromberg, Maria Muldaur, and John Sebastian, among others. Part of Camp Cripple Creek proceeds go to Levon Helm Studios.

In 2017, PBS's Infinity Hall Live program aired a televised performance by The Weight Band.

In February 2018, The Weight Band released their first studio album, World Gone Mad.

On April 18, 2018, The Weight Band performed at the Folk & Americana Music Series at the Boch Center in Boston, Massachusetts.

In 2018 and 2019, The Weight Band toured in the United States, with tour dates in Europe and Japan as well.

On October 25, 2019, The Weight Band rehearsed at Big Pink, the same venue where Bob Dylan and The Band collaborated. The Weight Band’s rehearsal and live performances at Big Pink became The Weight Band’s Acoustic Live album.

On July 3, 2020, The Weight Band’s Live is a Carnival live album was released by Continental Record Services.

On January 20, 2022, The Weight Band released “Shines Like Gold,” a single for an upcoming album of the same name.

== Discography ==
- World Gone Mad (2018)
- Acoustic Live (2019)
- Live Is a Carnival (2020)
- Shines Like Gold (2022)
