= Kevin Doherty (musician) =

Irish songwriter, musician and singer

Kevin Doherty is an Irish songwriter, musician and singer. He has played with various bands since the late 1980s and currently records and performs both as a solo artist and as a member of Four Men and a Dog.

== Early life ==
Kevin Doherty was born in the late 1960s and grew up in the seaside town of Buncrana, County Donegal, near the most northerly point in Ireland. The background sounds of his childhood included the fine voices of his mother singing country songs and Irish ballads and his father singing opera and 'crooning' classics.

By the age of about six years old, Kevin began learning to play the tin whistle with Dinny McLaughlin, a renowned teacher of traditional Irish music and dance. In the same class was Ciaran Tourish, now a member of the famous Irish traditional music group Altan.

As a teenager, Doherty took up the game of golf since his father a golf professional. He quickly developed into one of the brightest prospects of the game in the country. However, around the age of fifteen or sixteen, a fateful encounter with the works of Bob Dylan in a neighbour's house saw a dramatic change in direction for Doherty back to music again. Blown away by what he heard, a guitar was bought and notepads were quickly filled with his first songs. Early guidance on guitar was provided by talented local guitarist, Michael Gallinagh.

== Career ==
Doherty was soon playing regular sessions around Buncrana. The sessions included many other local musicians. Audience members travelled to hear Doherty reunited again with Ciaran Tourish and Dinny McLaughlin, as well as Paul Rodden, Michael Gallinagh, Laurence Doherty and visiting musicians such as Cathal Hayden. Doherty also travelled and busked in Dublin, Galway and London among other places.

There had previously been a Buncrana-based band, The Pyrotechnicos, which reformed in the mid to late 1980s with the shortened name 'The Pyros' and with the added younger talent of both Ciaran Tourish and Doherty. The band specialised in a punkish, electrified, amplified version of bluegrass, folk and country music. The band featured Paul Rodden on five-string banjo, Laurence Doherty on percussion, Michael Gallinagh on guitar, Doherty on mandolin and guitar, John Cutliffe on bass and Ciaran Tourish on fiddle. The band played several bluegrass and country standards at a blistering and technically bewildering pace, which had audiences stomping mad on the dance floors. Famously, one part of their set had Laurence play percussion on builder's hard hats while they were worn by the other band members.

After The Pyrotechnicos, Doherty was soon back up and running again with a new band, The Gooseberries. Laurence again was the drummer, along with Percy Robinson on pedal-steel, dobro and guitars, Sean McCarron on saxophone and Michael O'Boyce on bass. This became the stable line-up, but early appearances also had Ciaran Tourish or Martin McGinley on fiddle. A big difference from The Pyros was that this time the main material played consisted of Doherty's original songs. These were complemented by the inclusion of songs by the likes of Hank Williams and Dwight Yoakam. The band was a big hit live and ventured further afield in Ireland compared to The Pyros. Radio and television appearances also became part of the picture. The band were exceptional musicians and, somewhat similar to The Pyros, were well known for really getting a crowd going, as well as for the sensitive playing on Doherty's more downbeat numbers.

In the early 1990s The Gooseberries also went their separate ways and this was quickly followed by Doherty being asked to support Tanita Tikaram on a UK tour, which he did successfully as a solo act. Shortly afterwards came a call from another group, Four Men and a Dog. Mick (Black Dog) Daly (hence the band's name), the original singer and guitar player, had left the band. Doherty was asked to replace him and they are still together in 2007, with a hiatus period in-between of a few years around the turn of the millennium. Four Men and a Dog could justifiably be described as one of the 'super groups' of traditional Irish and folk music. Each member is recognised as being among the most talented musicians, not just in Ireland, but worldwide. The line-up currently consists of Cathal Hayden on fiddle and banjo, Gerry O'Connor on banjo and fiddle, Gino Lupari on bodhran, percussion and vocals, Donal Murphy on accordion and Doherty on vocals and guitar. Previous line-ups included Conor Keane on accordion and Brian McGrath on banjo and keyboards. Arty McGlynn on guitar and Mairtin O'Connor on accordion also occasionally play with them.

== Career within Four Men and a Dog ==
Four Men and a Dog have recorded six albums to date and have appeared at many of the world's major festivals and venues. Their performances and recordings include supreme examples of the playing of Irish traditional music and a mix of country, folk, blues and Americana, including original songs by Doherty. Two of the albums were recorded at the studio of Levon Helm (The Band) in Woodstock, New York. The Band, Kevin and Four Men and a Dog struck up a friendship after meeting up at some European festivals. The Band were among Doherty's musical heroes and Levon, Rick Danko and Garth Hudson performed on the two Woodstock Four Men and a Dog albums.

During the Four Men and a Dog hiatus period referred to above, Doherty recorded two solo albums, Strange Weather and Sweet Water, as well as a limited edition EP, Morocco. Strange Weather was also recorded in Woodstock and featured contributions by members of The Band. The latter album, Sweet Water, featured other musical icons; James Delaney is a master of the keyboard and has played with the likes of Van Morrison and Paul Brady; Henry McCullough is a genuine guitar legend in rock and folk music, probably most famously as a member of Paul McCartney's Wings and the Joe Cocker Grease band. James and Henry are now regular collaborators with Doherty as he sustains both a solo career and life with Four Men and a Dog.

The Band recorded 'Hawker's’ as 'Don't Wait' on what is seen as their album, Jubilation. Mary Black, Brendan Quinn, Adrian Dunbar, The Crowmatix and Andrew Murray have also recorded his material. In addition, Doherty has appeared on the albums of others as a guest guitarist and/or vocalist.

Between touring, he is mainly based in Dublin, Ireland and is known to visit his home place of Buncrana often.

== Current career ==
Kevin Doherty and Ciaran Tourish (former member of Altan since 1990) have formed a duo and recorded their new album Hotel Fiesta due to be launched on the occasion of 3 shows in Ireland in July 2019.
