= Jim Weider =

American guitarist (born 1951)

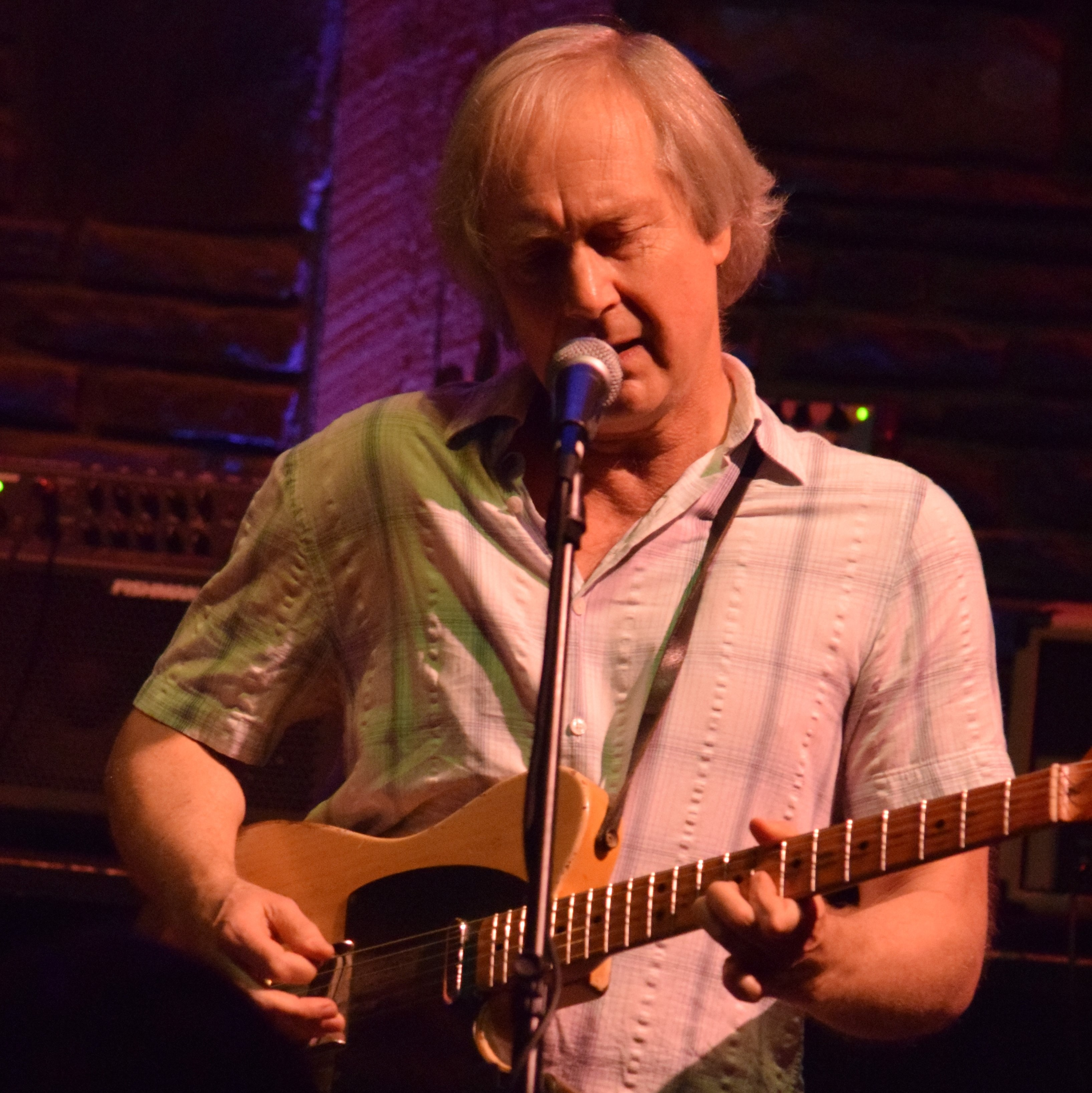
- Jim Weider at Levon Helm Studios, May 2015

Background information
- Born: December 21, 1951 (age 74); Woodstock, New York, U.S.
- Genres: Blues rock; roots rock; instrumental rock; jazz fusion; jam rock
- Occupations: Musician; songwriter
- Instrument: Guitar
- Years active: 1971–present
- Formerly of: The Band, Levon Helm Band, The Weight Band, Jim Weider's Project Percolator
- Website: jimweider.com

James Jeffrey Weider (born December 21, 1951) is an American guitarist, best known for his work with The Band. He joined the reformed version of the Band in 1985 to replace original guitarist Robbie Robertson.

== Biography ==
A native of Woodstock, New York, Weider was born in 1951 and began playing guitar at age 11. Some of his early influences included Chuck Berry, James Burton and Scotty Moore. While still a teenager in Woodstock, Weider was influenced by guitarist Buzz Feiten, Robbie Robertson and harp blues musician Paul Butterfield, he became acquainted with Levon Helm and Garth Hudson and was exposed to the Band's music. Weider went on to become an accomplished studio session player in cities such as Nashville, touring with Johnny Paycheck, Lee Clayton and James Talley and in Atlanta working at Axis Studios with Harvey Brooks (bassist) and Richard Bell (musician) but eventually returned to Woodstock to tour with Robbie Dupree and Levon Helm Woodstock All Stars. Levon Helm invited Weider to become the Band's sole guitarist in 1985, remaining until the group's dissolution in 2000 following the death of Rick Danko in late 1999. Highlights with The Band include performing at Roger Waters THE WALL in Berlin, Germany 1990, Bob Dylan's 30th anniversary celebration and Woodstock '94. Weider co-wrote on all three Band albums, including the song "Remedy" for Jericho (The Band album). As a member of The Band, he opened for the Grateful Dead at their final show.

Weider's main instrument is his 1952 Fender Telecaster, but he also plays a vintage 1960s Silvertone electric guitar (primarily for slide) and a vintage 1960s Guild Starfire III. For amplification, Weider uses a combination of Fender amplifiers and his own signature series JW40 amp, designed in conjunction with Fargen Amplification, Inc. He is also the co-designer of the Analog Man King of Tone overdrive pedal, which he uses on his pedalboard, and BIG-T PICKUPS he co-designed with Lindy Fralin, and the COLBY dtb amp released on April 4, 2013, as part of the COLBY Amps line of boutique guitar amplifiers created by guitarist Mitch Colby and Jim Weider.

In addition to his work with the Band and his own musical group, the Jim Weider Band, Weider has performed and recorded with numerous other musicians, including Mavis Staples (co-wrote "Have a Little Faith", winning the 2005 Blues Music Award), Los Lobos, Robbie Dupree, Dr. John, Graham Parker, Keith Richards and Bob Weir. He has also played alongside Keith Richards and Scotty Moore, who worked with Elvis Presley. Jim produced and played on Paul Burlison's album Train Kept A-Rollin and Tom Pacheco's Woodstock Winter. He is also featured in several instructional videos produced by Homespun Video. Following the departure of Jimmy Vivino in early 2009, Weider performed with the Levon Helm Band until Helm's death in 2012.

The latest incarnation of The Band's history, The Weight Band, originated inside the barn of Levon Helm Studios in 2013 when Jim Weider and Randy Ciarlante, both former members of The Band, were performing "Songs of The Band" with Garth Hudson, Jimmy Vivino and Byron Isaacs. After receiving support from fans, Weider, Ciarlante and Isaacs decided to continue the tradition of performing songs from The Band and invited Brian Mitchell and Marty Grebb -who contributed to both the Jericho and Jubilation albums- to complete their sound. The Weight Band later added Albert Rogers (2016), Michael Bram (2017) and Matt Zeiner (2019).

In 2015, Jim Weider started Camp Cripple Creek with The Weight Band, a celebration of The Band's music, with the first year at Levon Helm Studios and the years after at Full Moon Resort in Big Indian. Some of the guest artists were Jackie Greene, Larry Campbell (musician), Paul Barrere & Fred Tackett, David Bromberg, Maria Muldaur and John Sebastian, with part of the proceeds going to Levon Helm Studios.

In July 2017, PBS's Infinity Hall Live program began airing a televised performance by The Weight Band, featuring new music by the band. In January 2018, Weider announced the first studio album for the Weight Band, World Gone Mad. "Common Man" - co-written by Levon Helm - was released as the first single.

In 2018, The Weight Band was announced as the first headliner for the new Folk & Americana Music Series, a celebration of the genre's rich musical history and influence, at the Boch Center in Boston, Massachusetts. Their first guest was the Guthrie Family (Woody Guthrie).

In addition to playing in The Weight Band, Weider tours with G.E. Smith and Tom Principato as Masters of the Telecaster and does solo shows with his touring band Project Percolator.

== Discography ==
=== With the Band ===
- 1993 The 30th Anniversary Concert Celebration (tribute to Bob Dylan)
- 1993 Jericho
- 1995 Let It Rock (tribute to Ronnie Hawkins)
- 1996 Not Fade Away (Remembering Buddy Holly)
- 1996 High on the Hog
- 1998 Jubilation
- 1999 Tangled Up in Blues
- 1999 The Best of The Band, Vol. II

=== Solo ===
- 2000 Big Foot
- 2003 Remedy
- 2006 Percolator
- 2006 Festivalink Presents: Jim Weider's Project
- 2009 Pulse
- 2012 Jim Weider's Project Percolator Live at Olde Mystick Village

=== With the Weight Band ===
- World Gone Mad (2018)
- Acoustic Live (2019)
- Live Is a Carnival (2020)
- Shines Like Gold (2022)

=== Others ===
- Carry Me Home by Levon Helm and Mavis Staples, 2022
