= Maybe Tonight (disambiguation) =

"Maybe Tonight" is a 2006 song by Kate DeAraugo.

Maybe Tonight may also refer to:

== Music ==
=== Albums ===
- Maybe Tonight, EP by Maggie Rose, or its title track
- Maybe Tonight, album by Cathal Hayden 2002
- Maybe Tonight, album by Joyside
- Maybe Tonight, album by Four Men and a Dog
- Maybe Tonight, EP by The Jolt, 1979

=== Songs ===
- "Maybe Tonight" (Laura Branigan song), 1985
- "Maybe Tonight" (Sandra song), 2012
- "Maybe Tonight", song by Emmylou Harris from Last Date, 1983
- "Maybe Tonight", English language song by Greek band Onirama
- "Maybe Tonight", song by the Knack, from Get the Knack, 1979
- "Maybe Tonight", song by The Summer Set from Legendary
- "Maybe Tonight", song by William Tell, from You Can Hold Me Down
- "Maybe Tonight", song by Murray McLauchlan
- "Maybe Tonight", song by Lovelock on DJ-Kicks: Chromeo
- "Maybe Tonight", song by Shawn Fogel on album Millions Of Miles Away
- "Maybe Tonight", song by Magnum, from The Gathering, 1988
- "Maybe Tonight", song and single by The Shirelles, 1964
- "Maybe Tonight", song and single by Vince Gil from When Love Finds You, 1995
- "Maybe Tonight", song by Earl Klugh from Sudden Burst of Energy, 1996
- "Lovin' Tonight (Maybe Tonight)", song by The Arbors, 1969
- "Maybe Tonight", song by Catch
- "Maybe Tonight", song by Sandee from Only Time Will Tell
- "Maybe Tonight", song by Brooke Allison, from Brooke Allison
- "Maybe Tonight", song by Nicole Atkins, from Neptune City
