= Let It Rock (Ronnie Hawkins album) =

Live album by Ronnie Hawkins
- Released: 1995
- Recorded: January 8, 1995
- Venue: Massey Hall (Toronto)
- Genre: Rock & roll
- Length: 74:48
- Label: Quality
- Producer: Ronnie Hawkins, Steve Thomson

Singles from Let It Rock
- 1. "Days Gone By"

Let It Rock is a Juno Award-nominated album that documents American-Canadian singer Ronnie Hawkins's 60th birthday celebration and concert at Massey Hall in Toronto, Ontario. The concert took place on January 8, 1995, and featured performances by Hawkins, Carl Perkins, Jerry Lee Lewis, the Band and Larry Gowan. Jeff Healey sat in on guitar for most, if not all, of the performances. Hawkins's band, the Hawks, or permutations of it, backed most, if not all, of the acts. All of the musicians performing that night were collectively dubbed "the Rock ‘N’ Roll Orchestra". The concert is among the last recorded of both Perkins and Rick Danko of the Band. An eponymous video of the concert was also released.

The album also included a studio track of Hawkins performing his song "Days Gone By", backed by the Band and the Hawks. It was released as a single which went gold in Canada and reached 51 on the country charts in that country.

== Track listing ==
No.	Title	Principal Act	Length
1.	"Let It Rock"	Ronnie Hawkins	5:34
2.	"Down in the Alley"	Ronnie Hawkins	5:35
3.	"Mama Come Home"	Ronnie Hawkins	3:09
4.	"Remedy"	The Band	4:08
5.	"When There's Time for Love"	Larry Gowan	4:15
6.	"Good Golly, Miss Molly"	Larry Gowan	2:01
7.	"Long Tall Sally"	Larry Gowan	2:19
8.	"Wild Little Willy"	Ronnie Hawkins	3:44
9.	"Matchbox"	Carl Perkins	4:04
10.	"Blue Suede Shoes"	Carl Perkins	3:22
11.	"Mary Lou"	Ronnie Hawkins	1:51
12.	"Ruby Baby"	Ronnie Hawkins	3:49
13.	"The Weight"	The Band	5:20
14.	"Rock 'N' Roll Shoes"	The Band	4:56
15.	"Whole Lotta Shakin' Goin' On"	Jerry Lee Lewis	4:34
16.	"Great Balls of Fire"	Jerry Lee Lewis	4:16
17.	"Hey! Bo Diddley"	Ronnie Hawkins	4:41
18.	"Who Do You Love?"	Ronnie Hawkins	3:29
19.	"Days Gone By" (bonus studio track)	Ronnie Hawkins and The Hawks w/The Band	3:41

== Personnel ==
- Brent Bailey – keyboards
- Jerry Baird – drums
- Richard Bell – keyboards
- Tim Bovaconti – vocals
- Sam Boutzouvis – guitar, vocals
- Randy Ciarlante – drums, vocals
- Rick Danko – bass, vocals
- Terry Danko – bass
- Jerry Elston – guitar
- Larry Gowan – keyboards, vocals
- Leah Hawkins – vocals
- Robin Hawkins – guitar
- Ronnie Hawkins – vocals, producer
- Jeff Healey – guitar
- Levon Helm – drums, vocals
- Bert Hermiston – tenor saxophone
- Garth Hudson – horn, keyboards
- Peter Jeffrey – trumpet
- Jerry Lee Lewis – piano
- Lianne – vocals
- Rick Morrison – baritone saxophone
- Carl Perkins – guitar, vocals
- Stan Perkins – drums
- Pat Rush – slide guitar
- Joe Schenck – piano
- Bob Shindle – engineer
- Brian 'Buzz' Thompson – guitar
- Steve Thomson – producer
- Jim Weider – guitar
- Henry Zmijak – monitor engineer
