= Randy Ciarlante =

American musician

- Born: Woodstock, New York, U.S.
- Genres: Blues rock; roots rock; instrumental rock; jazz fusion; jam rock
- Occupations: Musician; songwriter
- Instruments: Vocals; drums; percussion
- Years active: 1970s–present

Randy Ciarlante is an American musician who frequently played with The Band. He joined The Band in 1990, singing harmony and playing drums. He played and sang on their albums from the 1990s, including Jericho, High on the Hog and Jubilation. After the Band dissolved, he joined the Jim Weider Band from 1998 to 2006 and continues to play occasionally with Weider's Percolator band. In 2006, he joined the Organiks, a band based in Woodstock, New York, in which he is a primary vocalist, songwriter and drummer, along with Bruce Katz, Jay Collins and Chris Vitarello. Randy Ciarlante has also been a mainstay of the Woodstock music scene since 1981 and has played with many of that area's leading musicians over the years.

== Discography ==
=== With Eric Andersen ===
- 1968 More Hits from Tin Can Alley

=== With The Band ===
- 1993 Jericho
- 1993 The 30th Anniversary Concert Celebration (tribute to Bob Dylan)
- 1995 Let It Rock (tribute to Ronnie Hawkins)
- 1996 Not Fade Away (Remembering Buddy Holly)
- 1996 High on the Hog
- 1998 Jubilation
- 1999 Tangled Up in Blues
- 1999 The Best of The Band, Vol. II

=== With Rick Danko ===
- 1997 Rick Danko in Concert
- 1999 Live on Breeze Hill
- 2000 Times Like These

=== With Levon Helm ===
- 2000 Souvenir, Vol. 1

=== With Jim Weider ===
- 2000 Big Foot
- 2003 Remedy
- 2006 Percolator

=== With Mad Conductor ===
- 2010 Central America
- 2015 Space Rock Steady
