= Four Men and a Dog =

Irish traditional band

Four Men and a Dog is an Irish traditional band that emerged in 1990 during the Belfast Folk Festival. The band plays Irish traditional music with a mixture of different other genres, including rock, jazz, blues, bluegrass, swing, salsa, polka and even rap. They originally had their name because of former singer Mick Daly's nickname; "The Black Dog". Daly was later replaced with Kevin Doherty. Other original members included Gino Lupari, Donal Murphy, Brian McGrath, and Cathal Hayden.

Their debut album, Barking Mad (1991), was granted Folk Roots magazine's "Album of the Year" award, the first time that an Irish group had that honour. Line-up changes ensued before in 1993, Shifting Gravel, their second album, was not well received by critics nor the public. Their displeasure was centered around Doherty's pop/rock leanings, which overwhelmed the earlier pure Celtic undertones of the group.

They met The Band in 1994, and recorded their album Doctor A's Secret Remedies (1995) at Levon Helm's studio in Woodstock, New York, with musical guests Garth Hudson and Randy Ciarlante. Rick Danko also joined Four Men and a Dog on a UK tour where they played some of The Band's classics.

Long Roads followed in 1996.

== Band members ==
- Cathal Hayden (fiddle)
- Gerry O'Connor (banjo, fiddle)
- Gino Lupari (bodhran, bones, vocals)
- Kevin Doherty (guitar, vocals)
- Dónal Murphy (accordion)

== Discography ==
- Barking Mad (1991)
- Shifting Gravel (1993)
- Doctor A's Secret Remedies (1995)
- Long Roads (1996)
- Maybe Tonight (2003)
- Wallop the Spot (2007)
- And the Band Played On (2016)
