= Dónal Murphy =

Irish accordionist

Dónal Murphy is a British-born Irish traditional accordionist, known for his work with the band Four Men and a Dog. Born in Birmingham to a father who played the button accordion and a mother who was a step dancer, he moved to Limerick as a child. Here he co-founded Four Men and a Dog in 1990 together with Cathal Hayden (fiddle), Brian McGrath (banjo), Gino Lupari (Bodhrán) and Mick Daly (guitar/vocals).

In 2009 he released the solo album “Happy Hour”, and since 2015 he tours with his band "Breaking Trad". He has also played in the band Sliabh Notes with Matt Cranitch and Tommy O'Sullivan, a band specializing in the traditional music of the Sliabh Luachra region.
