= Stan Szelest =

American musician (1942–1991)

- Born: February 11, 1942; Buffalo, New York, U.S.
- Died: January 20, 1991 (aged 48) Woodstock, New York, U.S.
- Genres: Country rock; rhythm and blues; rock and roll; country
- Occupation: Musician
- Instruments: Vocals; keyboards
- Years active: 1958–1991

Stanley Martin Szelest (February 11, 1942 – January 20, 1991) was an American musician from Buffalo, New York, known for founding an influential blues band in the 1950s and 1960s, Stan and the Ravens, and later as a keyboardist with Ronnie Hawkins and, briefly, with The Band.

== Biography ==
In 1958, Szelest formed Stan and the Ravens, a blues group that became popular in western New York. New York producer David Lucas recorded sessions with the group, resulting in the release "Farmer's Daughter" a song written by Szelest. Lucas also recorded a song entitled, "Howlin' for My Darlin" and b-side, "It Won't Be Long Now" using the name, the Rivals instead of Stan and the Ravens for the Spector/Wand label. Lucas made some other recordings of the group, only one of which "Rag Top", has ever been released.

In 1967, Stan and the Ravens broke up, although they would re-unite occasionally well into the 1980s. In 2009, the Buffalo Music Hall of Fame released "Rag Top" on a CD compilation, and again on a vinyl compilation in 2016 – this time featuring Szelest on the cover (see discography).

In 1960, at the age of seventeen, he started to work with Ronnie Hawkins and his backing group, the Hawks. Calling Szelest "a living fountain of rock and roll piano", Hawks bass player Rick Danko claimed to have developed his bass style by copying Szelest's left-hand work on piano. Szelest left the Hawks a little over a year later and was replaced by Richard Manuel. The Hawks later left Hawkins to form an act of their own, which eventually came to be named The Band.

Szelest went on to have a busy career as a session player with acts as diverse as fellow Hawks alumnus King Biscuit Boy to avant-garde former Velvet Underground member John Cale. Szelest was also in Lonnie Mack's band during the 1980s and played on Mack's albums Strike Like Lightning and Attack of the Killer V; he can also be seen in several videos playing in Mack's band during that period. Szelest would return to Ronnie Hawkins many times over the years as well.

In the summer of 1984, Szelest began playing with his old bandmate from The Hawks Levon Helm as a member of his Woodstock All-Stars, who played intermittently for the next four years, often featuring the Stan And The Ravens song "Rag Top" in their sets. Szelest joined The Band, playing live with them in 1990 and participating in rehearsals and writing for their new record deal with CBS Records. He died of a heart attack in 1991 while in Woodstock recording with Levon Helm, Rick Danko and Garth Hudson. His piano playing can be heard on The Band's 1993 album Jericho (see discography). The album also features the song "Too Soon Gone", co-written by Jules Shear after Szelest handed him over 16 bars of a melody, which sat around Shear's Woodstock home. When Szelest died, Shear was called by both Levon Helm and Rick Danko and asked to finish the song as a tribute to Szelest. Apparently, Szelest had begun the song as a tribute to the late Richard Manuel. The album is dedicated to Manuel and Szelest with the caption "Too Soon Gone" in the liner notes.

Stan Szelest was inducted into The Buffalo Music Hall of Fame in 1986.

== Discography ==
with Stan & the Ravens

- Farmer's Daughter / No Turning Back (1965) (as "The Raven's") Sahara Records (SH 45–112)
- Howlin' For My Darlin' / It Won't Be Long Now (1966) (as "The Rivals") Wand Records (WND 1146)
- "Rag Top" on Buffalo Music Hall Of Fame Compilation CD Volume Two (2009), Buffalo Music Hall Of Fame
- "Rag Top" on Vinyl Volume 1.2016 (features an image of Szelest on the cover) (2016), Buffalo Music Hall Of Fame (BMHOF2016)

with Ronnie Hawkins

- The Folk Ballads of Ronnie Hawkins (1960), Roulette Records – Appears on "Summertime", "I Gave My Love a Cherry", "John Henry", "Sometimes I Feel Like a Motherless Child"
- Rock And Roll Resurrection (1972) Monument – piano
- The Giant Of Rock 'N' Roll (1974) Monument – piano
- The Hawk (1979) United Artists Records – piano
- The Hawk & Rock (1982) Trilogy records International – piano
- The Hawk In Concert (1986) MMG Video – piano, lead vocals on "Whole Lotta Shakin' Goin' On"

with Lonnie Mack

- Lonnie Mack And Pismo (1977) Capitol Records – keyboards
- Strike Like Lightning (1985) Sonet/Alligator – piano, organ, keyboards
- Second Sight (1986) Sonet/Alligator – Keyboards, co-wrote “Camp Washington Chili”
- S.R.V. (box set) by Stevie Ray Vaughan & Double Trouble (2000) Legacy/Epic – Organ on “If You Have to Know” (With Lonnie Mack)

Other contributions

- John Cale – Vintage Violence (1970), Columbia – keyboards
- Grinders Switch Featuring Garland Jeffreys (1970) Vanguard – piano, organ, harmonica, vocals
- Roger Tillison – Roger Tilison's Album (1971) Atco – Piano
- Charlie Starr – Tough & Tender (1971) Prophecy Records – piano
- Marg Osburne – My Kind Of Country (1972) Marathon – piano
- Jesse Ed Davis – Ululu (1972) Atco – piano on "White Live Fever"
- Allan Capson – Country Lane In My Mind (1973) Marathon – piano, organ
- Donna Moon – Bittersweet (1973) Marathon – piano
- Jo-Anne Newman – Easy Country (1974) Condor – piano
- Crosby & Nash – Wind on the Water (1975) ABC Records/Polydor – electric piano on “Fieldworker”
- Jack Nitzsche – Blue Collar – Music From The Original Motion Picture Score (1978) MCA Records – piano
- Steve Gillette – A Little Warmth (1979) Regency Records/Flying Fish/Trio Records – piano
- John Lewis – Gator Blue (1982) Warpt Records – piano
- David Wilcox – Bad Reputation (1984) Capitol Records – piano
- King Biscuit Boy – Mouth Of Steel (1984) Stoney Plain Records – keyboards, piano
- Roy Buchanan – Dancing on the Edge (1986), Alligator
- Roy Buchanan – Hot Wires (1987), Alligator
- George Carver – The Modern Agriculture (1988) Trace Elements Music – piano, organ
- Staying Together Original Soundtrack (1989) Rhino Records – performs with Levon Helm on “Lean On Me”, co-wrote and performed on “Hotel Buick”, “Big Love in A Small Town”
- The Northern Pikes – Snow in June (1990) Virgin – piano
- Jack de Keyzer – Hard Working Man (1991) WEA – piano on “Nothing In The World”, “Wash My Blues Away’
- The Band – Jericho (1993) – Appears on "Blind Willie McTell", "Atlantic City"; co-wrote (with Jules Shear) "Too Soon Gone"
- The Band – High On The Hog (1996) Pyramid Records – co-wrote “The High Price of Love”
- Jim Weider And The Honky Tonk Gurus – Big Foot (1997) – Piano on the Chuck Berry instrumental "Deep Feeling" (recorded 1990)
- Professor Louie & The Crowmatix – The Lost Band Tracks (2017) – Funzalo/Woodstock Records – co-wrote "Too Soon Gone", "Long Ways Across Tennessee"
- The Weight Band – World Gone Mad (2018) – co-wrote “You're Never Too Old (to Rock'N Roll)”
- Neil Young – Homegrown (2020) – Reprise – piano on " We Don't Smoke It No More", wurlitzer on "Vacancy" (recorded 1974/75)
