= Professor Louie =

American singer-songwriter

Professor (Aaron L. Hurwitz) Louie
- Born: Aaron L. Hurwitz; Peekskill, New York, U.S.
- Genres: Rock; Blues; Gospel
- Occupations: Musician; Songwriter; Vocalist; Record Producer
- Instruments: Keyboards, accordion, vocals
- Years active: 1972–present

Aaron L. Hurwitz, known by the stage name Professor Louie, is an American singer-songwriter, musician, and record producer who is best known for producing three studio albums for The Band, as well as being the founder and producer for the Grammy nominated musical group, Professor Louie & The Crowmatix. He is the founder of Woodstock Records, which has released albums by New Riders of the Purple Sage, Rick Danko and Waydown Wailers, among others. He was inducted into the Blues Hall of Fame in New York Chapter in 2016.

== Music career ==
Hurwitz was given the name Professor Louie by Rick Danko of The Band. "While performing as a duo with Rick Danko on stage, Rick would start calling me Professor Louie, and it was really a great honor", said Louie in an interview with Accordion Americana, "Most people, especially those on the business end, knew me as Professor Louie. So I kept it". Hurwitz joined up with The Band in 1990s, producing three of their studio albums, Jericho, High on the Hog, and Jubilation, as well as performing on and producing their hit song, "Atlantic City".

Hurwitz has produced and performed with Graham Parker, Commander Cody, Guy Davis, and Buckwheat Zydeco, among others.

Nominated for five Grammy Awards, Professor Louie & the Crowmatix began as the backing band for The Band but became successful on their own, touring internationally and recording eighteen studio albums. The Crowmatix current members is composed of Louie, Todd Mihan, Marie Spinosa, Frank Campbell, Dan Hickey and Eric Puente. Past members are John Platania, Gary Burke, Jimmy Eppard, Randy Ciarlante, Mike Dunn, Mike Demicco. Their album, Crowin' the Blues charted at #24 on the Australian Blues & Roots Airplay International Charts in 2017 and Miles of Blues, was awarded, Best Album, by Radio Crystal Blue in 2019.Their most current recording 2025's Crowin' Around has been played on over 190 radio stations and was #1 for five weeks on The Relix Jam Band Charts.

Hurwitz is also the founder of Woodstock Records, which includes album releases by New Riders of the Purple Sage, Rick Danko, Garth Hudson, Rick Danko, Levon Helm, Waydown Wailers,Jesse McReynolds, Michel Falzarano, John Berenzy among others.
