= Porkbelly Futures =

Canadian musical group

- Origin: Toronto, Ontario, Canada
- Genres: Blues
- Years active: 2005–present
- Labels: Opening Night Recordings, Wildflower Records, Cordova Bay
- Members: Stuart Laughton; Chas Elliott; Rebecca Campbell; Martin Worthy; Teddy Leonard
- Past members: Paul Quarrington; Richard Bell

Porkbelly Futures is a Canadian blues music group based in Toronto, Ontario. The latest lineup of the band included lead singer Paul Quarrington (1953-2010), guitarist/harmonica player Stuart Laughton, bass player Chas Elliott (Toronto Symphony), and vocalist Rebecca Campbell.

== History ==
Porkbelly Futures was formed in the late 1990s by writer and filmmaker Quarrington, Laughton, Elliott, and drummer-songwriter Martin Worthy. The band started out performing in bars and clubs in Toronto.

Their first album, Way Past Midnight, was released by Opening Night Recordings and Judy Collins's Wildflower Records and spent six months on the American roots/blues charts. Richard Bell played keyboards until his death in 2007. Campbell joined the band in time to contribute to the band's second album, Porkbelly Futures, which was released in April 2008 on Cordova Bay Records.

Quarrington was diagnosed with cancer while the band was working their third album. He continued to work on the recording of the album and to tour Canada with the band until shortly before his death in January, 2010. Worthy took over vocals some of the vocals in place of Quarrington, while guitarist Teddy Leonard also joined, and Chris Brown contributed on keyboards. The CD, The Crooked Road, was released November 2010 on Cordova Bay Records.

== Discography ==
- 2005: Way Past Midnight
- 2008: The Porkbelly Futures
- 2010: The Crooked Road
