= Blind Willie McTell (song) =

1983 song by Bob Dylan

Promotional single by Bob Dylan

from the album The Bootleg Series Volumes 1–3 (Rare & Unreleased) 1961–1991
- Released: March 26, 1991
- Recorded: May 5, 1983
- Studio: Power Station, New York City
- Genre: Folk; blues; (acoustic version)
- Length: 5:52
- Label: Columbia Records
- Songwriter: Bob Dylan
- Producer: Mark Knopfler

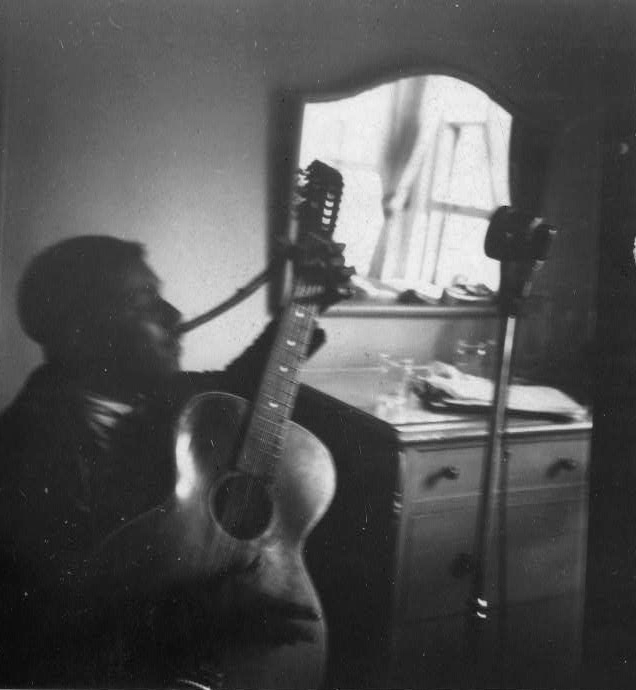
McTell in 1940

"Blind Willie McTell" is a song written and performed by American singer-songwriter Bob Dylan. Named for the blues singer of the same name, the song was recorded in the spring of 1983, during the sessions for Dylan's album Infidels; however, it was ultimately left off the album and did not receive an official release until 1991, when it appeared on The Bootleg Series Volumes 1–3 (Rare & Unreleased) 1961–1991. It was also later anthologized on Dylan (2007).

== Composition and recording ==
The song's melody is loosely based on the jazz standard "St. James Infirmary Blues". For the version included on The Bootleg Series Volumes 1–3, Dylan plays piano and is accompanied only by Mark Knopfler on acoustic guitar. The lyrics are comparable to later Dylan songs "High Water (For Charley Patton)" and "Goodbye Jimmy Reed" in that they pay tribute to the titular blues singer indirectly. Dylan sings a series of plaintive verses depicting allegorical scenes which reflect on the history of American music and slavery. Each verse ends with the same refrain: "Nobody can sing the blues like Blind Willie McTell". There was also an electric version of the song recorded with Mick Taylor playing slide guitar.

== Critical reception and legacy ==
Michael Gray's book Song and Dance Man III: The Art of Bob Dylan (2000) includes a chapter on this song and its musical and historical background.

Following three albums with overt Christian themes, Infidels struck most major rock critics as dealing largely with secular concerns, and they hailed it as a comeback. When bootleggers released the outtakes from Infidels, the song was recognized as a composition approaching the quality of such classics as "Tangled Up in Blue", "Like a Rolling Stone" and "All Along the Watchtower". According to Dylan biographer Clinton Heylin, the song is regarded by many as "Dylan's one indisputable masterpiece of the early eighties".

In 2020, Rolling Stone Australia ranked it as the 19th best Dylan song as a ‘chilling tribute’ to the real McTell who, like Dylan, toured constantly. Rolling Stone also cited Mark Knopfler's surprise when Dylan delayed its release.

Spectrum Culture included the song on a list of "Bob Dylan's 20 Best Songs of the 1980s". Peter Tabakis argues it is "a six-minute repudiation of any argument that somehow insists Dylan's '80s output was fallow. The song, with its spare and dramatic piano backbone by Dylan himself, accented with Knopfler's haunting guitar notes, seems performed in an open field at midnight. The tableau is as cinematic as Dylan gets. An arrow swings on a doorpost. An owl hoots. Feathered maidens strut. Martyrs fall. A canopy of stars hovering over 'barren trees' transforms into an uproarious crowd".

Greil Marcus, from the vantage point of 2021, wrote of the song: "Over three decades, that little rehearsal has emerged as one of Dylan's greatest songs—or even, perhaps, in the right mood, his greatest recording. From the start, it had a burgeoning charisma: the more you played it, the more it demanded that the volume go up, a fraction every time, until you hit the limit and realized it still wasn't loud enough".

Patterson Hood of the Drive-By Truckers cited it as his favorite Dylan song in a 2021 Stereogum article, writing, "With McTell as a starting point, Dylan constructed a time travel from slave days through the Jim Crow South with a kitchen sink full of delta imagery, Bible scripture, and vaudevillian shuck and jive. Yet, as it goes with the best of songs, it also remains elusive and mysterious, benefitting as much from what it leaves out as for what it actually says".

The Guardian in one of its article from 2021 included the song on a list of "80 Bob Dylan songs everyone should know".

== In live performance ==
"Blind Willie McTell" was a concert staple for the Band throughout the 1990s. They also recorded it for their 1993 album Jericho. Dylan later claimed in a Rolling Stone interview that hearing the Band's version of the song inspired him to begin performing it at his own concerts:

Dylan can't possibly be sorry that the world has had the benefit of hearing, for instance, "Blind Willie McTell", – an outtake from 1983's Infidels that has subsequently risen as high in most people's Dylan pantheon as a song can rise, and that he himself has played live since. Can he? Bob Dylan – "I started playing it live because I heard the Band doing it. Most likely it was a demo, probably showing the musicians how it should go. It was never developed fully, I never got around to completing it. There wouldn't have been any other reason for leaving it off the record. It's like taking a painting by Monet or Picasso – goin' to his house and lookin' at a half-finished painting and grabbing it and selling it to people who are 'Picasso fans.'"

According to his official website, Dylan performed the song 226 times on the Never Ending Tour between 1997 and 2017. An August 17, 1997 concert performance appeared on various releases of his "Love Sick" single in June 1998. Dylan also performed a version of the song, hailed as "absolutely stellar" by Rolling Stone, for a televised tribute to Martin Scorsese at the Critics' Choice Movie Awards in 2012.

== Other versions ==
Two different full-band versions from the Infidels sessions in 1983 were officially released in 2021, one on The Bootleg Series Vol. 16: Springtime in New York 1980–1985, and another on a vinyl single released by Third Man Records.

== Covers ==
This song has been covered by dozens of artists, including: The Band, Lucinda Williams, Chrissie Hynde, Mick Taylor and The Dream Syndicate.
