= Richard Bell (musician) =

Canadian musician (1946–2007)

- Born: March 5, 1946; Toronto, Ontario, Canada
- Died: June 15, 2007 (aged 61) Toronto, Ontario, Canada
- Genre: Rock
- Occupation: Musician
- Instrument: Piano
- Formerly of: Full Tilt Boogie Band, Crowbar, Ronnie Hawkins, the Band, Porkbelly Futures, Colin Linden, Blackie and the Rodeo Kings, David Wilcox

Richard Bell (March 5, 1946 – June 15, 2007) was a Canadian musician best known as the pianist for Janis Joplin and her Full Tilt Boogie Band. He was also a keyboardist with the Band during the 1990s.

== Early life and career ==
Richard Bell was the son of the Canadian composer and musician Dr. Leslie Bell. Richard started playing the piano at the age of four and studied music at Canada's Royal Conservatory of Music.

After a short stint in The Mid-Knights, Bell's career first gained significance when he joined Ronnie Hawkins as a member of the group And Many Others, following the departure of Hawkins's previous band (who would gain fame as the Band). Hawkins fired the entire band in early 1970, and they renamed themselves Crowbar, subsequently recording Official Music (as King Biscuit Boy with Crowbar) (1970, Daffodil; 1996, Stony Plain). Bell left Crowbar shortly after this to join Janis Joplin's Full Tilt Boogie Band, making good on an offer made the previous year by her manager.

== Janis Joplin ==
In the late 1960s, while touring with Hawkins at the Fillmore East, Bell was approached by Michael Friedman, an associate of Joplin's manager, Albert Grossman, and invited to join her new ensemble. His playing can be heard on her posthumously released album Pearl and many bootleg recordings from her 1970 tour, including performances from the Festival Express "train tour" of Canada. Bell was interviewed many years later for the 2003 documentary film of the same name.

== Session work ==
Following Joplin's death, Bell moved to Woodstock, New York, where he worked as a session musician. Among those he worked with during this time were Paul Butterfield, Arlen Roth, Karen Dalton and John Sebastian.

Other acts Bell worked with include Blackie and the Rodeo Kings, Bruce Cockburn, Judy Collins, the Fridge Magnets, Cowboy Junkies, Bob Dylan, Michael Kaeshammer, Bonnie Raitt and Joe Walsh.

== The Band ==
Bell moved to Atlanta, Georgia, in 1979 and played with various bands, including Pyro, with Jim Weider and Rick Pierce. He did session work also. He married Mary Deacon in 1979. He played with the Convertibles, with bandmates Scott Boyer and Tommy Talton (Cowboy), Topper Price, Brian Wheeler (Locust Fork) and Rick Kurtz (Delbert McClinton), among others, before returning to Canada and the Band.

In 1991, Bell joined the reconstituted lineup of the Band as a keyboardist, replacing Stan Szelest (himself a replacement for original pianist, Richard Manuel, who committed suicide in 1986). Bell remained with the Band through their final three albums (Jericho, High on the Hog, and Jubilation). He was credited as a co-writer of "The Caves of Jericho", from the album Jericho. The death of Rick Danko in 1999 essentially ended the association known as the Band.

== Later years ==
In later years, Bell performed as keyboard player with Canadian roots-rock performers such as Colin Linden, Blackie and the Rodeo Kings, Paul Reddick, Kathleen Edwards and Jeff Lazare.

At the time of his death, Bell had been performing regularly as a keyboardist, songwriter and occasional vocalist with the Porkbelly Futures and Danny Brooks & the Rockin' Revelators. (He produced two of Brooks's albums.) Bell was also a member of the country-rock group Burrito Deluxe, performing and contributing songs to their CD Disciples of the Truth.

Bell died after a long battle with multiple myeloma on June 15, 2007, in Toronto's Sunnybrook Health Sciences Centre, at the age of 61.
