= Percy Robinson =

English cricketer

Personal information
- Born: 2 November 1881; Bristol
- Died: 29 January 1951 (aged 69); Somerset
- Batting: Right-handed

Domestic team information
- Years: Team
- 1904-1921: Gloucestershire
- Source: Cricinfo, 30 March 2014

Percy Robinson (2 November 1881 – 29 January 1951) was an English cricketer. He played for Gloucestershire between 1904 and 1921.
