= Waydown Wailers =

American blues & rock band

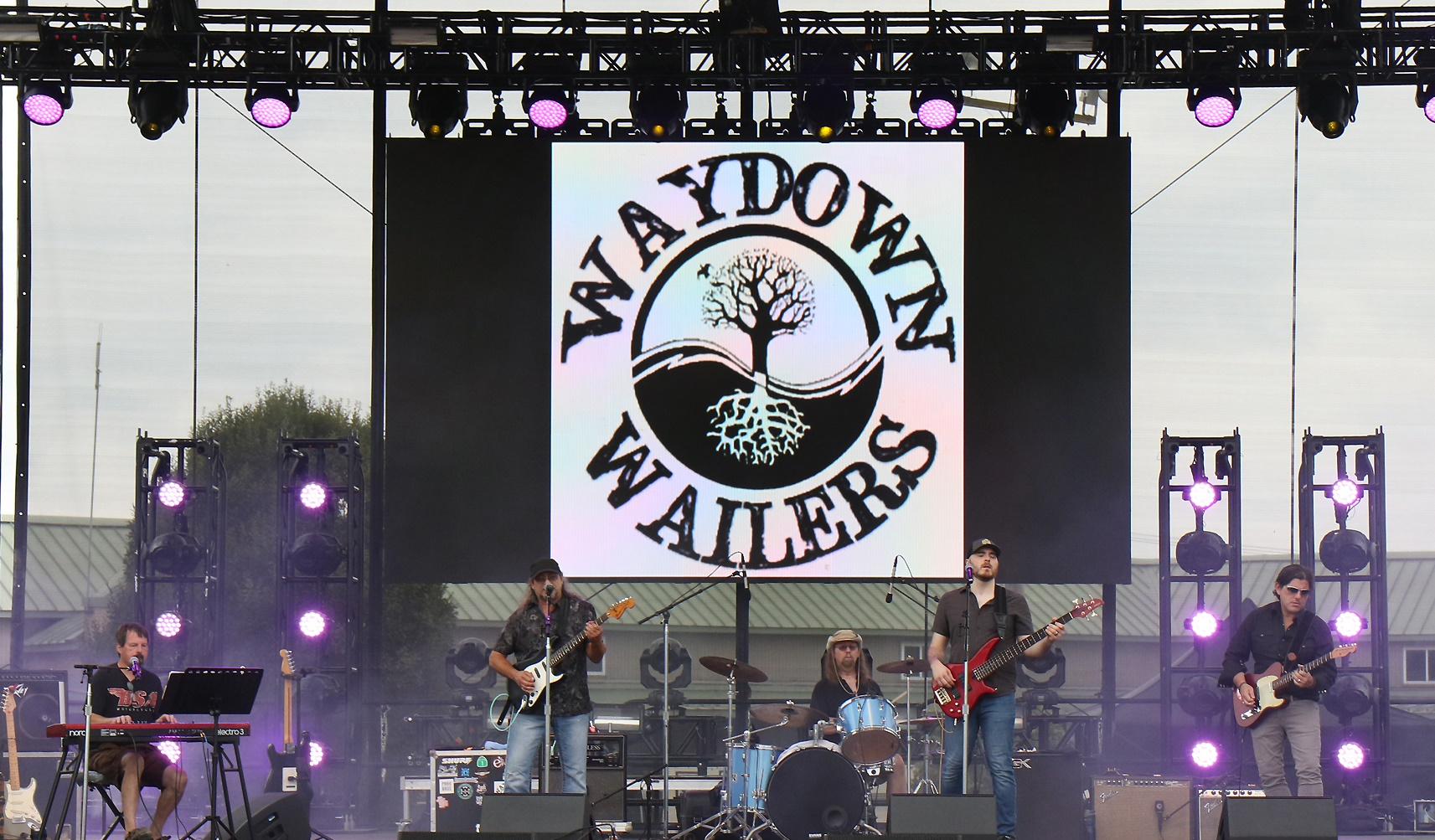
- Waydown Wailers Performing in 2021

Background information
- Origin: Syracuse, New York
- Genres: Blues; Americana; rock; swamp rock
- Years active: 2011–present
- Labels: Woodstock Records; Subcat Records
- Members: Christian Parker; Michael (Scruffy) Scriminger; Joey Thomas; Dave Parker; Connor Pelkey
- Website: waydownwailers.com

Waydown Wailers are an American blues, rock, swamp rock, and Americana band composed of brothers Dave and Christian Parker, Michael (Scruffy) Scriminger, Joey Thomas, and Connor Pelkey. Their album, Backland Blues (2018), was well received and topped out at #5 on the Blues Rock Chart. The musical group has toured extensively in the Northeastern US and has been the opening act for Lady Antebellum, The Charlie Daniels Band, and Jerrod Niemann, among others.

== Music career ==
Waydown Wailers were formed in 2011. Brothers, David Parker (guitar/vocals) and Christian Parker (guitar) joined up with Michael (Scruffy) Scriminger (drums) and later Connor Pelkey (bass) Sean Cunningham (bass) and Joe Thomas (keyboards/guitar/vocals) joined the band. The musical group has toured extensively in the Northeastern US and has released three studio albums with songs charting on the blues and blues rock charts.

- Albums
- 2013 - State of the Union - produced by Professor (Aaron L. Hurwitz) Louie on Woodstock Records
- 2016 - Empty Promises - produced by Professor Louie on Woodstock Records - was on the Grammy nomination ballot for Best Americana Album. Their song Jealousy, was on the ballot for Best Americana Roots Song, and their cover of the Creedence Clearwater Revival song, Susie Q, was on the ballot for Best Americana Roots Performance.
- 2018 - Backland Blues - produced by Professor Louie on Woodstock Records
- Radio Airplay
- Whiskey and Cornbread (Empty Promises) charted at #17 IndieWorld Country Record Report - October 14, 2016
- Backland Blues charted at # 5 on the Blues Rock Album chart on June 23, 2018 charted at #7 on The New York Blues chart on January 1, 2019.
