= Jubilation (The Band album) =

Studio album by the Band
- Released: September 15, 1998
- Recorded: March–May 1998
- Genre: Rock
- Length: 43:02
- Label: River North
- Producers: Aaron Hurwitz, the Band

The Band chronology
High on the Hog (1996)	Jubilation (1998)	The Best of the Band, Vol. II (1999)

Professional ratings
Review scores
Source	Rating
AllMusic	link
The Music Box	link

Jubilation is the tenth and final studio album by Canadian/American rock group the Band. Recorded in the spring of 1998 in Levon Helm's home studio in Woodstock, New York, it was released on September 15, 1998. For the first time since the group reformed without guitarist and songwriter Robbie Robertson, there were more originals than covers. Songs include "Last Train to Memphis", featuring guest guitarist Eric Clapton, Garth Hudson's solo instrumental closer "French Girls", Rick Danko's "High Cotton" and the ode to Ronnie Hawkins, "White Cadillac".

On only one track, "If I Should Fail", do all six group members appear. Helm and Danko are missing from one track each, guitarist Jim Weider is missing from two. Richard Bell is replaced by producer/engineer Aaron Hurwitz on piano and keyboards for much of the album (Bell appears on just three tracks). Hudson and drummer-percussionist Randy Ciarlante are on every track. As with the prior two albums, numerous guest musicians appear on the album as well.

While primarily released on CD and cassette, a limited pressing of a few hundred copies of the album was released in September 1998 on purple marbled vinyl exclusively through the now-defunct site In the Studio. In 2026, a limited repressing of 1,500 copies was released on red swirl vinyl.

The album cover is by Illinois folk artist George Colin.

This is the only album released by the Band to include no contributions from vocalist-pianist Richard Manuel, who died in 1986. In an August 1998 web interview, the group revealed they were already working on a follow-up that has not been released. When Rick Danko died the following year, it was the factual end of The Band.

== Track listing ==
Jubilation track listing
No.	Title	Writer(s)	Lead vocals	Length
1.	"Book Faded Brown"	Paul Jost	Rick Danko	4:12
2.	"Don't Wait"	Kevin Doherty; The Band	Levon Helm	4:09
3.	"Last Train to Memphis" (featuring Eric Clapton)	Bobby Charles; The Band	Helm	4:06
4.	"High Cotton"	Tom Pacheco; Danko; Helm	Danko	3:25
5.	"Kentucky Downpour"	The Band; Marty Grebb	Helm	4:26
6.	"Bound by Love" (featuring John Hiatt)	Hiatt	Danko; Hiatt	3:22
7.	"White Cadillac (Ode to Ronnie Hawkins)"	Randy Ciarlante; Jim Weider; Helm	Ciarlante	3:38
8.	"If I Should Fail"	Pacheco; Danko	Danko	3:56
9.	"Spirit of the Dance"	Weider; Ciarlante; Danko; Helm	Danko; Ciarlante	5:05
10.	"You See Me"	Allen Toussaint	Helm	4:36
11.	"French Girls"	Garth Hudson	instrumental	2:07

=== Limited edition vinyl pressing ===
Side one
No.	Title	Length
1.	"Book Faded Brown"	4:12
2.	"Don’t Wait"	4:09
3.	"Last Train to Memphis" (featuring Eric Clapton)	4:06
4.	"High Cotton"	3:25
5.	"Spirit of the Dance"	5:05

Side two
No.	Title	Length
1.	"Bound by Love" (featuring John Hiatt)	3:22
2.	"White Cadillac (Ode to Ronnie Hawkins)"	3:38
3.	"If I Should Fail"	3:56
4.	"Kentucky Downpour"	4:25
5.	"You See Me"	4:36
6.	"French Girls"	2:07

== Personnel ==
The Band

- Rick Danko – acoustic and electric bass guitars, double bass, acoustic guitar, lead and backing vocals
- Levon Helm – drums, percussion, harmonica, mandolin, acoustic guitar, lead and backing vocals
- Garth Hudson – keyboards, organ, accordion, piano, synthesizers, vocoder, soprano, alto and tenor saxophones, bells
- Randy Ciarlante – drums, percussion, backing and lead vocals
- Jim Weider – guitars, mandolin, dobro
- Richard Bell – piano, accordion

Additional personnel

- Aaron Professor Louie Hurwitz – producer, engineer, piano, organ, accordion, backing vocals
- Tom Malone – trombone, trumpet, tenor and baritone saxophone
- Eric Clapton – guitars
- John Hiatt – high-string guitar, vocals
- Tom Pacheco – guitar
- Bobby Charles – percussion, backing vocals
- Marie Spinosa – percussion, backing vocals
- Marty Grebb – keyboards, backing vocals
- Jim Eppard – tenor guitar, mandolin
- Mike Dunn – bass guitar
- Kevin Doherty – backing vocals
- Amy Helm – backing vocals
- Maud Hudson – backing vocals

=== Track-by-track personnel ===
"Book Faded Brown"

- Rick Danko – lead vocals, string bass, acoustic guitar, backing vocals
- Jim Weider – acoustic guitar
- Garth Hudson – accordion
- Aaron Hurwitz – piano, Hammond organ
- Randy Ciarlante – drums, backing vocals
- Maud Hudson – backing vocals
- Marie Spinosa – backing vocals

"Don't Wait"

- Levon Helm – lead vocals, acoustic guitar, harmonica, mandolin
- Jim Weider – acoustic Dobro
- Garth Hudson – piano
- Aaron Hurwitz – accordion
- Rick Danko – string bass, backing vocals
- Randy Ciarlante – drums, backing vocals
- Marie Spinosa – backing vocals

"Last Train to Memphis"

- Levon Helm – lead vocals, triangle, acoustic guitar, harmonica, mandolin, drums
- Jim Weider – electric guitar
- Eric Clapton – lead guitar, rhythm guitar
- Garth Hudson – accordion, piano, tenor saxophone
- Rick Danko – string bass, backing vocals
- Randy Ciarlante – drums, percussion, backing vocals
- Marie Spinosa – percussion, backing vocals
- Aaron Hurwitz – backing vocals

"High Cotton"

- Rick Danko – lead vocals, string bass, acoustic guitar
- Tom Pacheco – acoustic guitar
- Levon Helm – mandolin, harmonica
- Garth Hudson – synthesizers, soprano and tenor saxophones
- Aaron Hurwitz – piano
- Randy Ciarlante – drums, backing vocals
- Marie Spinosa – backing vocals
- Kevin Doherty – backing vocals

"Kentucky Downpour"

- Levon Helm – lead vocals, drums
- Rick Danko – harmony vocals
- Garth Hudson – tenor sax
- Tom Malone – baritone and tenor saxophones, trumpet, trombone
- Jim Weider – acoustic Dobro guitar
- Aaron Hurwitz – Hammond organ
- Richard Bell – piano
- Mike Dunn – electric bass
- Randy Ciarlante – percussion, backing vocals
- Marie Spinosa – percussion, backing vocals
- Amy Helm – backing vocals

"Bound by Love"

- Rick Danko – lead vocals, string bass, acoustic guitar
- John Hiatt – lead vocals, high string guitar
- Levon Helm – mandolin
- Garth Hudson – accordion
- Aaron Hurwitz – piano, backing vocals
- Randy Ciarlante – drums, backing vocals
- Maud Hudson – backing vocals
- Marie Spinosa – backing vocals

"White Cadillac (Ode to Ronnie Hawkins)"

- Randy Ciarlante – lead vocals
- Rick Danko – harmony vocals
- Jim Eppard – tenor guitar
- Jim Weider – electric guitar
- Aaron Hurwitz – accordion, backing vocals
- Richard Bell – piano, accordion
- Mike Dunn – string bass
- Levon Helm – drums, triangle, mandolin
- Garth Hudson – whistle, siren, shaker
- Marie Spinosa – backing vocals

"If I Should Fail"

- Rick Danko – lead vocals, string bass, acoustic guitar, backing vocals
- Levon Helm – acoustic rhythm guitar, harmonica
- Jim Weider – acoustic Dobro, mandolin
- Garth Hudson – synthesizer
- Richard Bell – Hammond organ
- Aaron Hurwitz – piano, accordion
- Randy Ciarlante – drums, percussion
- Marie Spinosa – backing vocals

"Spirit of the Dance"

- Rick Danko – lead vocals, electric bass, backing vocals
- Randy Ciarlante – lead vocals, percussion, backing vocals
- Tom Malone – baritone and tenor saxophones, trumpet, trombone
- Jim Weider – Dobro, acoustic guitar solo
- Jim Eppard – mandolin
- Garth Hudson – piano, vocoder
- Aaron Hurwitz – accordion
- Levon Helm – drums
- Marie Spinosa – percussion, backing vocals

"You See Me"

- Levon Helm – lead vocals, drums, harmonica
- Garth Hudson – organ, tenor and soprano saxophones
- Jim Weider – electric guitar
- Mike Dunn – electric bass
- Tom Malone – baritone and tenor saxophones, trumpet, trombone
- Aaron Hurwitz – piano, backing vocals
- Marie Spinosa – backing vocals
- Randy Ciarlante – backing vocals

"French Girls"

- Garth Hudson – synthesizers, accordion, bells, tenor and soprano saxophones
