= High on the Hog (The Band album) =

Studio album by the Band
- Released: February 27, 1996
- Recorded: 1995; except "Ramble Jungle", 1990/1991 and 1995, and "She Knows", January 19, 1986
- Genre: Rock
- Length: 46:57
- Label: Rhino
- Producers: Aaron Hurwitz, Garth Hudson

The Band chronology
Live at Watkins Glen (1995)	High on the Hog (1996)	Jubilation (1998)

Professional ratings
Review scores
Source	Rating
AllMusic	link

High on the Hog is the ninth studio album by Canadian-American rock group the Band, released in 1996. As with its predecessor, 1993's Jericho, it relies heavily on cover versions; only two tracks are original. Songs include Bob Dylan's "Forever Young" (which was intended as a tribute to Jerry Garcia), a live recording of Richard Manuel (who had died ten years prior) performing "She Knows", and the closer "Ramble Jungle" (which features vocals by Champion Jack Dupree).

== Track listing ==
High on the Hog track listing
No.	Title	Writer(s)	Lead vocals	Length
1.	"Stand Up"	Bruce Channel, Sonny Throckmorton, Ricky Ray Rector	Levon Helm	3:07
2.	"Back to Memphis"	Johnnie Johnson, A. Kenney, M. Orr, G. Martin, F. Young, R. Young	Helm with Rick Danko	5:10
3.	"Where I Should Always Be"	Blondie Chaplin	Danko	4:27
4.	"Free Your Mind"	Denzil Foster, Thomas McElroy	Helm	5:05
5.	"Forever Young"	Bob Dylan	Danko, Randy Ciarlante, Helm	6:30
6.	"The High Price of Love"	Jules Shear, Stan Szelest	Helm with Danko	5:58
7.	"Crazy Mama"	J. J. Cale	Danko	4:48
8.	"I Must Love You Too Much"	Dylan, Helena Springs	Danko, Ciarlante	3:32
9.	"She Knows"	James Griffin, Robb Royer	Richard Manuel	3:21
10.	"Ramble Jungle"	Ciarlante, Champion Jack Dupree, Helm, Garth Hudson, Rob Leon, Jim Weider	Dupree	4:59

The European and Japanese pressings of the album included a bonus track, "Young Blood", which only appeared in the US on a tribute album to Doc Pomus and which is the only release by the group to include vocals by multi-instrumentalist Garth Hudson. A 2006 CD release on the U.S. label Titan/Pyramid Records includes two bonus tracks, the first of which is "Young Blood"; the other is the Sam Cooke cover "Chain Gang", which was previously unreleased.

Originally released on CD and cassette, the album was released for the first time on vinyl for its 30th anniversary with a limited pressing of 1,500 copies on black vinyl and 500 on "Coke-bottle clear" vinyl.

== Artwork ==
The artwork for the album was done by longtime artistic designer Barry E. Jackson. In a 1996 interview, Helm describes how the title for the album came first and the initial idea for the artwork was "a cartoon of us riding racing pigs, and we would be coming into the home stretch and the crowd would be cheering and we'd have our guitars and instruments strapped to our backs. Maybe Aaron would be out front with four hogs pulling the wagon." When it was determined such an intricate scene wouldn't fit on a CD, Gabites came up with the resulting cover instead.

== Personnel ==
The Band

- Rick Danko – acoustic and electric bass, acoustic guitar, vocals
- Levon Helm – drums, bass guitar, harmonica, vocals
- Garth Hudson – keyboards, soprano, alto, tenor, baritone and bass saxophone, accordion, organ, trumpet, vocals on bonus track "Young Blood"
- Richard Manuel – piano and vocals on "She Knows"
- Jim Weider – guitars, bass guitar
- Randy Ciarlante – drums, percussion, vocals
- Richard Bell – piano, keyboards, keyboard bass, horns

Additional personnel

- Tom Malone – trombone, trumpet and baritone saxophone on "Stand Up", "Free Your Mind" and "Ramble Jungle"
- Ron Finck – tenor saxophone and flute on "Stand Up", "Free Your Mind" and "Ramble Jungle"
- Howard Johnson – baritone saxophone on "Stand Up" and "Free Your Mind"
- Blondie Chaplin – acoustic guitar and vocals on "Crazy Mama" and "I Must Love You Too Much"
- Colin Linden – acoustic guitar on "Forever Young"
- Larry Packer – violin and viola on "She Knows"
- Frank Luther – string bass on "She Knows"
- Jason Myles – harp emulation and programming on "She Knows"
- Champion Jack Dupree – vocals on "Ramble Jungle"
- Kenn Lending – guitar on "Ramble Jungle"
- Rob Leon – bass guitar on "Ramble Jungle"
- Maud Hudson – backing vocals on "I Must Love You Too Much"
- Marie Spinosa – backing vocals on "I Must Love You Too Much"
- Ian Kimmett – backing vocals on "I Must Love You Too Much"
- Horns arranged by Garth Hudson, Richard Bell, Levon Helm, Aaron Hurwitz and Tom Malone
- Co-produced and engineered by Aaron "Professor Louie" Hurwitz
- Cover art by Barry E. Jackson
