= Not Fade Away (Remembering Buddy Holly) =

Studio album by Various Artists
- Released: February 1996
- Genre: Country
- Length: 36:54
- Label: MCA

Professional ratings
Review scores
Source	Rating
AllMusic	3/5 stars

Not Fade Away (Remembering Buddy Holly) is a tribute album to Buddy Holly. It was released in February 1996 by MCA Records. The album peaked at number 19 on the Billboard Top Country Albums chart and number 119 on the all-genre Billboard 200.

== Track listing ==
Not Fade Away (Remembering Buddy Holly) track listing
No.	Title	Writer(s)	Performer(s)	Length
1.	"Peggy Sue Got Married"	Buddy Holly	Buddy Holly and The Hollies	3:52
2.	"True Love Ways"	Holly, Norman Petty	The Mavericks	3:07
3.	"Well…All Right"	Jerry Allison, Holly, Joe Mauldin, Petty	Nanci Griffith and The Crickets	2:15
4.	"Midnight Shift"	Jimmy Ainsworth, Earl Lee	Los Lobos	2:55
5.	"Not Fade Away"	Holly, Petty	The Band and The Crickets	3:25
6.	"Think It Over"	Allison, Holly, Petty	The Tractors	2:58
7.	"Wishing"	Holly, Petty, Bill Tilghman, Sonny West	Kevin Montgomery and Mary Chapin Carpenter	3:26
8.	"Oh, Boy!"	Holly, Petty, Tilghman, West	Joe Ely and Todd Snider	2:46
9.	"Crying, Waiting, Hoping"	Holly	Marty Stuart and Steve Earle	3:51
10.	"It Doesn't Matter Anymore"	Paul Anka	Dave Edmunds and Suzy Bogguss	2:26
11.	"Maybe Baby"	Holly, Petty	Nitty Gritty Dirt Band	2:47
12.	"Learning the Game"	Holly	Mark Knopfler and Waylon Jennings	3:06

== Charts ==
Chart performance for Not Fade Away (Remembering Buddy Holly)
Chart (1996)	Peak position
US Billboard 200	119
US Top Country Albums (Billboard)	19
