= Tangled Up in Blues =

Compilation album by Various Artists
- Recorded: July 13, 1999
- Length: 62:28
- Label: House of Blues
- Producer: John Snyder

Professional ratings
Review scores
Source	Rating
Allmusic	2.5/5 stars

Tangled Up in Blues: Songs of Bob Dylan is a 1999 album of Bob Dylan songs performed by various artists, featuring blues legends such as R.L. Burnside, Mavis Staples, and Taj Mahal. Additional artists include Isaac Hayes, Leon Russell, and Dylan's long-time collaborators, The Band.

Two reissues of the album were released under the title All Blues'd Up!: the first in the U.S. in 2002 and the second in the Netherlands in 2003. While both feature the same tracks as the original release, the songs on the U.S. reissue were in a different order.

Tangled Up in Blues was part of a series issued by the House of Blues record label under the tongue-in-cheek title "This Ain't No Tribute Album". The series featured 12 albums which were released from 1997 through 2002. Other artists whose works were highlighted in the series included The Rolling Stones, Led Zeppelin, Eric Clapton, and Janis Joplin.

== Track listing ==
The album's 12 songs originally appeared in the following order:

1. "One Too Many Mornings" – The Band
2. "All Along the Watchtower" – Larry McCray
3. "It Takes a Lot to Laugh, It Takes a Train to Cry" – Taj Mahal
4. "Gotta Serve Somebody" – Mavis Staples
5. "Everything Is Broken" – R.L. Burnside
6. "Lay Lady Lay" – Isaac Hayes
7. "Million Miles" – Alvin Youngblood Hart
8. "Wallflower" – The Holmes Brothers
9. "Pledging My Time" – Luther "Guitar Junior" Johnson
10. "I'll Be Your Baby Tonight" – John Hammond, Jr.
11. "Ballad of a Thin Man" – James Solberg
12. "Watching the River Flow" – Leon Russell

The following track listing was used for the 2002 U.S. reissue:

1. "It Takes a Lot to Laugh, It Takes a Train to Cry" – Taj Mahal
2. "Gotta Serve Somebody" – Mavis Staples
3. "Lay Lady Lay" – Isaac Hayes
4. "Everything Is Broken" – R.L. Burnside
5. "Pledging My Time" – Luther "Guitar Junior" Johnson
6. "I'll Be Your Baby Tonight" – John Hammond, Jr.
7. "Ballad of a Thin Man" – James Solberg
8. "Million Miles" – Alvin Youngblood Hart
9. "Watching the River Flow" – Leon Russell
10. "Wallflower" – The Holmes Brothers
11. "All Along the Watchtower" – Larry McCray
12. "One Too Many Mornings" – The Band

== See also ==
- List of songs written by Bob Dylan
- List of artists who have covered Bob Dylan songs
