= Jericho (The Band album) =

1993 studio album by the Band

Studio album by the Band
- Released: November 2, 1993
- Recorded: Mid-1993, except "Country Boy" (October 1985) and "Atlantic City" (1990–91)
- Studios: Levon Helm Studios; NRS Studios; Neressa Studios; BearTracks Studios ("Atlantic City"); Bearsville Studios ("Blind Willie McTell" and "Blues Stay Away from Me"); Woodstock Studios ("Country Boy")
- Genre: Rock
- Length: 56:53
- Label: Rhino
- Producers: John Simon, Aaron L. Hurwitz, the Band

The Band chronology
The Night They Drove Old Dixie Down: The Best of the Band Live in Concert (1990)	Jericho (1993)	Across the Great Divide (1994)

Jericho is the eighth studio album by Canadian-American rock group the Band. It was released on November 2, 1993, through Rhino Entertainment subsidiary Pyramid Records. It was the band's first studio album since Islands (1977) and their first since re-forming without guitarist and songwriter Robbie Robertson in 1983. Returning from the original lineup were Levon Helm (drums, mandolin and vocals), Rick Danko (bass, guitar and vocals), and Garth Hudson (organ, keyboards and horns), while pianist and vocalist Richard Manuel, who died in 1986, posthumously appears on one track. New to the group were drummer Randy Ciarlante, keyboardist Richard Bell, and guitarist Jim Weider. In addition to the core band lineup, many guest musicians and songwriters contributed to the album.

Jericho consists of new material written by both the original and new members of the band, contributions from outside songwriters, and covers of artists including Bob Dylan, Bruce Springsteen, and Muddy Waters. The album was released to positive reviews and was a steady seller, despite only peaking at number 166 on the Billboard 200. "Remedy" and a cover of Springsteen's "Atlantic City" were released as promotional singles to support the album, with the former reaching number 14 in Canada. Special praise has been directed at the band's ability to proceed successfully despite the absences of Robertson and Manuel, as well as their interpretations of "Atlantic City" and Dylan's "Blind Willie McTell". The Band would release the follow-up album High on the Hog in 1996.

The album, which was originally released on cassette and CD, received a limited 1,000-copy vinyl pressing in 2025 for Record Store Day,

== Recording ==
In 1985, the Band went into the studio for the first time since 1977 with the intent of recording tracks for an eventual album. Richard Manuel had recently expressed interest in writing new material for the group, and had written "Breaking New Ground" with Gerry Goffin and Carole King. However, on March 4, 1986, Manuel died by suicide, and the Band abandoned efforts to make an album for several years.

In 1990, Sony offered the Band a recording contract. The group hired fellow Hawks member Stan Szelest to replace Manuel on keyboards, and proceeded to record new material with songwriter Jules Shear. However, these recordings were rejected by Sony, which suggested the group take submissions from various songwriters. Just as recording continued, Szelest died of a heart attack. The Band then requested release from Sony and found a new contract with Great Pyramid Records. Without Manuel or Robbie Robertson as songwriters, the group relied mostly on outside sources, such as Muddy Waters, Willie Dixon, Bruce Springsteen, and their friends Bob Dylan and Artie Traum. A few sessions also involved Champion Jack Dupree. "Country Boy", a song from the 1985 sessions with Manuel on vocals, was also selected for inclusion on the album. John Simon, who had produced the Band's first two albums, was again brought in to produce along with Aaron L. Hurwitz (engineer, record producer), to form the collection which would ultimately become Jericho. The album was finally completed in 1993, with new members Richard Bell, Randy Ciarlante and Jim Weider on keyboards, second drums and lead guitar respectively.

Among the new material are four new originals written by the group—"Remedy" (written by Weider and producer John Simon), "The Caves of Jericho" (co-written by Helm and Bell with Simon), "Too Soon Gone" (co-written by Szelest with Jules Shear), and "Move to Japan" (written by Helm, Szelest, and Weider with Simon and Joe Flood)—as well as two contributions from outside songwriters, Artie Traum's "Amazon (River of Dreams)" and "Shine a Light", composed by Marty Grebb and Daniel Moore. The rest of the album consists of six covers—Bob Dylan's "Blind Willie McTell", Bruce Springsteen's "Atlantic City", "Country Boy" (previously released as "I'm Just a Country Boy" by Don Williams, among other artists), Muddy Waters' "Stuff You Gotta Watch", Willie Dixon's "Same Thing", and The Delmore Brothers' "Blues Stay Away from Me".

== Cover ==
The album cover is a painting by Peter Max of the "Big Pink" house in West Saugerties, New York, where Bob Dylan and the Band recorded music during the mid to late 1960s. The albums The Basement Tapes and Music from Big Pink both originated from the music created in this house. The painting depicts the same view of the house used in the photographs on the cover of Music from Big Pink.

== Reception ==
Professional ratings
Review scores
Source	Rating
AllMusic	3.5/5 stars
Rolling Stone	2.5/5 stars

Mark Deming of AllMusic gave the album 3.5 stars out of 5. He wrote that while Robertson's strong songwriting and stinging lead guitar were sorely missed, the remaining musicians and guests performed well and Jericho "did unexpectedly prove that the Band could function very well without Robertson". Rolling Stone called their version of "Atlantic City" a "clear highlight". "Stuff You Gotta Watch" was included in the 1994 film Little Big League.

== Track listing ==
Jericho track listing
No.	Title	Writer(s)	Lead vocals	Length
1.	"Remedy"	Colin Linden, Jim Weider	Levon Helm	4:25
2.	"Blind Willie McTell"	Bob Dylan	Rick Danko, Helm	6:42
3.	"The Caves of Jericho"	Richard Bell, Helm, John Simon	Helm	5:23
4.	"Atlantic City"	Bruce Springsteen	Helm	5:16
5.	"Too Soon Gone"	Jules Shear, Stan Szelest	Danko	3:59
6.	"Country Boy"	Marshall Barer, Fred Brooks	Richard Manuel	3:17
7.	"Move to Japan"	Joe Flood, Helm, Simon, Szelest, Weider	Helm	4:25
8.	"Amazon (River of Dreams)"	Artie Traum	Danko	6:00
9.	"Stuff You Gotta Watch"	Muddy Waters	Helm	2:50
10.	"Same Thing"	Willie Dixon	Helm	4:31
11.	"Shine a Light"	Marty Grebb, Daniel Moore	Danko, Helm	4:12
12.	"Blues Stay Away from Me"	Alton & Rabon Delmore, Henry Glover, Wayne Raney	Helm with Danko	6:01

== Personnel ==
The Band

- Rick Danko – bass guitar, guitars, fiddle, trombone, keyboards, vocals
- Levon Helm – drums, percussion, mandolin, guitar, vocals
- Garth Hudson – organ, keyboards, accordion, electric piano, saxophones, synthesizers, horns
- Richard Manuel – piano, keyboards, and vocals on "Country Boy"
- Randy Ciarlante – drums, percussion, backing vocals
- Rick Bell – keyboards, organ, piano, accordion, backing vocals
- Jim Weider – guitars, backing vocals
- Stan Szelest – electric piano on "Atlantic City" and "Blind Willie McTell"

Guest musicians

- John Simon – electric piano, horns, saxophones
- Champion Jack Dupree – piano on "Blind Willie McTell"
- Vassar Clements – fiddle on "The Caves of Jericho" and "Stuff You Gotta Watch"
- Eric Bazilian – mandolin on "Atlantic City"
- Rob Hyman – keyboards on "Atlantic City"
- Steve Jordan – drums on "Blues Stay Away from Me"
- Jules Shear – backing vocals on "Too Soon Gone"
- Tommy Spurlock – steel guitar on "The Caves of Jericho"
- Artie Traum – acoustic guitar on "Amazon (River of Dreams)"
- Colin Linden – backing vocals on "Amazon (River of Dreams)"
- Bobby Strickland – tenor and baritone saxophones on "Remedy" and "Stuff You Gotta Watch"
- Dave Douglas – trumpet on "Remedy" and "Stuff You Gotta Watch"
- Rob Leon – bass guitar on "Too Soon Gone", "Amazon" and "The Caves of Jericho"

Production

- The Band – producers
- Aaron "Professor Louie" Hurwitz – producer, engineer
- John Simon – producer
- Chris Andersen – engineer
- Steve Churchyard – engineer
- John Roper – engineer
