= Infinity Hall =

Coordinates: 41.9912°N 73.1999°W

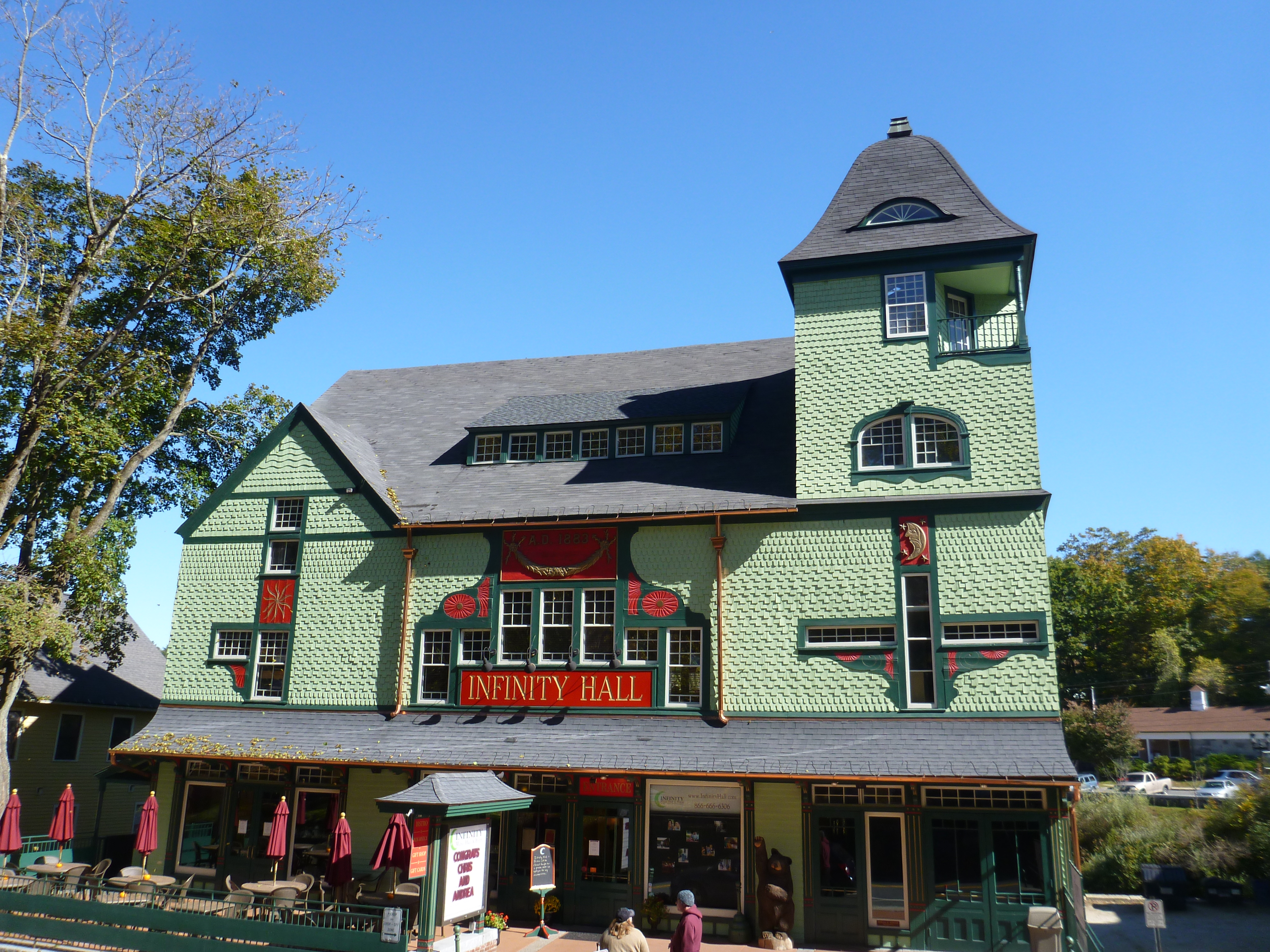
Infinity Hall in 2012

Infinity Hall is an American performing arts venue located in a historic building (constructed in 1883) in Norfolk, Connecticut. Another venue also named Infinity Hall is operated by the same company in Hartford, Connecticut.

== Infinity Hall, Norfolk ==
=== History ===
The venue was constructed in 1883 and originally functioned as a combination opera house, barber shop and saloon. The building was chartered as the Norfolk Village Hall, although it was commonly known as the Norfolk Opera House. It was designed by the architect George Palliser, from Bridgeport, Connecticut, who published its design in his book, Palliser's Court Houses, Village, Town and City Halls, Jails and Plans of Other Public Buildings (1889).

The Norfolk Opera House hosted vaudeville and theatrical presentations until the late 1940s. For the following four decades, it was used as a restaurant and a grocery store. The building was closed in 1994 and remained vacant for four years. In 1998 Kimberly Gelvin-Melville (now Kimberly Gelvin-Wilks) was given "right to first refusal" to try to get the townspeople or someone else to buy and restore the old opera house as a theater and not apartments or offices. She then produced a theater play in the dead of winter to try to draw public awareness of this glorious opera house she wished to run her own theater company in with the help of Trustees. The Four Poster was produced at The White Hart Inn in Salisbury and the Smithies saw the article in the tristate paper, Litchfield Times, about the building and Kimberly Gelvin-Melville's desire to save it. She gave the Smithies permission to purchase it because they liked all of her ideas to turn it back into a theater and run shops downstairs to help finance it. In 1998, the building was purchased by playwrights and theater producers Maura Cavanaugh and Richard Smithies for US$50,000, who undertook a US$650,000 restoration that included the rebuilding of an observation tower that was part of the original structure. Cavanaugh and Smithies renamed the venue the Greenwoods Theater and brought dramatic and musical productions to its stage. Mr. Smithie had asked Kimberly to play Cleopatra in a future production but sadly Mrs. Cavanaugh Smithie decided she did not wish to include Kimberly as a director or actress for fear of her getting the credit for their restorations. The theater was restored and Kimberly attended the opening but then returned to live in Australia with her former husband and daughter.

Cavanaugh and Smithies operated the Greenwoods Theater until early 2007, when financial difficulties forced them to close the venue.

=== Rebirth as Infinity Hall ===
The venue was purchased by Dan Hincks for US $240,000 in a tax auction on February 3, 2007. Hincks, the chief executive officer of the Farmington, Connecticut-based printing and publishing business Data Management, undertook further interior and exterior restorations of the venue, including substantial structural improvements, a new restaurant named Infinity Bistro, a Meyer sound system, modern green room facilities, cabaret mezzanine seating, new wood finishing and expansion of the lower level. The resulting renovation created a 300-seat performing arts theater and restaurant destination. Hincks renamed the venue as Infinity Hall, telling an interviewer: "I called it Infinity because the sky is the limit when it comes to bringing people together with music."

Infinity Hall's opening night was October 17, 2008, with a concert by singer Kenny Rankin. Subsequent concerts featuring Melissa Manchester, Spyro Gyra, Richie Havens and Todd Rundgren. In May 2009, an in-house bistro was opened. In its first two years, Infinity Hall hosted more than 400 concerts attracting in excess of 80,000 patrons. In 2010, Infinity Music Hall was voted Best Music Hall in New England by Yankee magazine.

Infinity Bistro, which opened May 1, 2009, was voted Best New Restaurant in Litchfield County and runner-up statewide in 2010 by a readers poll for Connecticut Magazine.

Beginning in 2012, Connecticut Public Television and American Public Television began a series of live musical performances at Infinity Hall by well-known artists as part of their Infinity Hall Live television series.

== Infinity Hall, Hartford ==
Infinity Hall, Hartford is located in a modern building on 32 Front Street, in the Front Street Entertainment District, near the Connecticut Convention Center. It seats about 500 total – 415 on the stage level plus 90 in the mezzanine. For general admission shows the capacity increases to 750.

== See also ==
- Lists of theatres
- Music of Connecticut
- Theatre of the United States
