= Cathal Hayden =

Irish musician

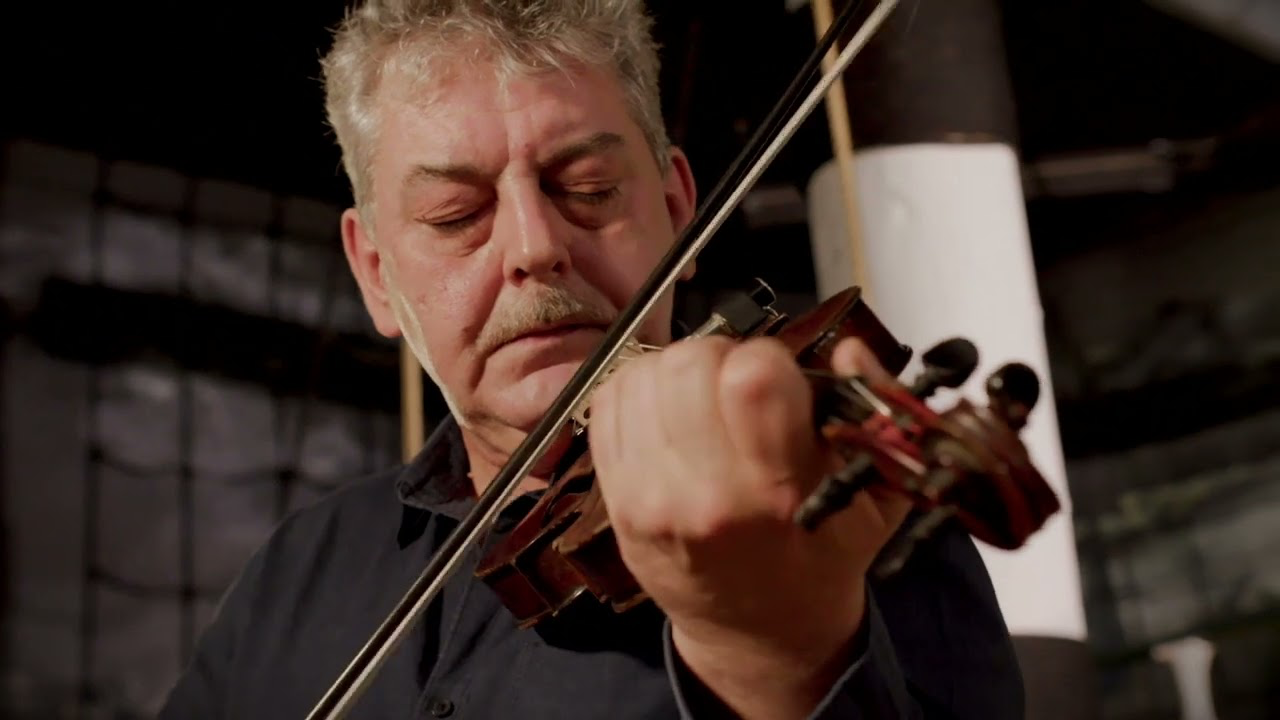

Background information
- Born: July 13, 1963 (age 63); Rock, County Tyrone, Northern Ireland
- Genres: Irish traditional music
- Occupation: Musician
- Instruments: Fiddle, tenor banjo
- Years active: 1970–present

Cathal Sean Hayden is a Northern Irish musician, acclaimed for his skilled style of Irish fiddle and tenor (four-stringed) banjo. He was born on 13 July 1963, in the village of the Rock, County Tyrone (outside Pomeroy), an area immersed in traditional music.

The third of eight children, Hayden was born into an environment steeped in traditional Irish music; his father and both of his grandfathers all played the fiddle, with his father playing tenor banjo as well, inspiring Hayden as a boy to learn both instruments. Additionally, his mother was a pianist, often accompanying traditional musicians. As a young man, Hayden competed in the Fleadh Cheoil ([ˌfʲlʲaː ˈçoːlʲ]; English: "music festival"), Ireland's yearly international music competition-festival, winning the category of All-Ireland Champion on both banjo and fiddle. He is an original member of the group Four Men and a Dog, whose debut album, Barking Mad (1991), won Folk Roots' Best New Album award the year of its release.

== Discography ==
- Handed Down (1988)
- Barking Mad (1991)
- Shifting Gravel (1993)
- Doctor A's Secret Remedies (1995)
- Long Roads (1996)
- Cathal Hayden (1999)
- Maybe Tonight (2002)
- Live in Belfast (2007)
- Crossroads (2008) (with Máirtín O'Connor and Seamie O'Dowd; for details, see irishtune.info)
- Hooked on Banjo (2016)
- Bow Brothers (2017) (with Stephen Hayden and Niall Murphy; for details, see irishtune.info)

== See also ==
- Four Men and a Dog

== Reviews ==
- Review by Geoff Wallis of the album Cathal Hayden
- folkmusic.net review of the album Cathal Hayden
- folkworld.de review of the album Cathal Hayden
- Review by Geoff Wallis of the album Live in Belfast
- Eddie Creaney's review of the album Live in Belfast
- Review of Erne
