= The Band =

Canadian and American rock band

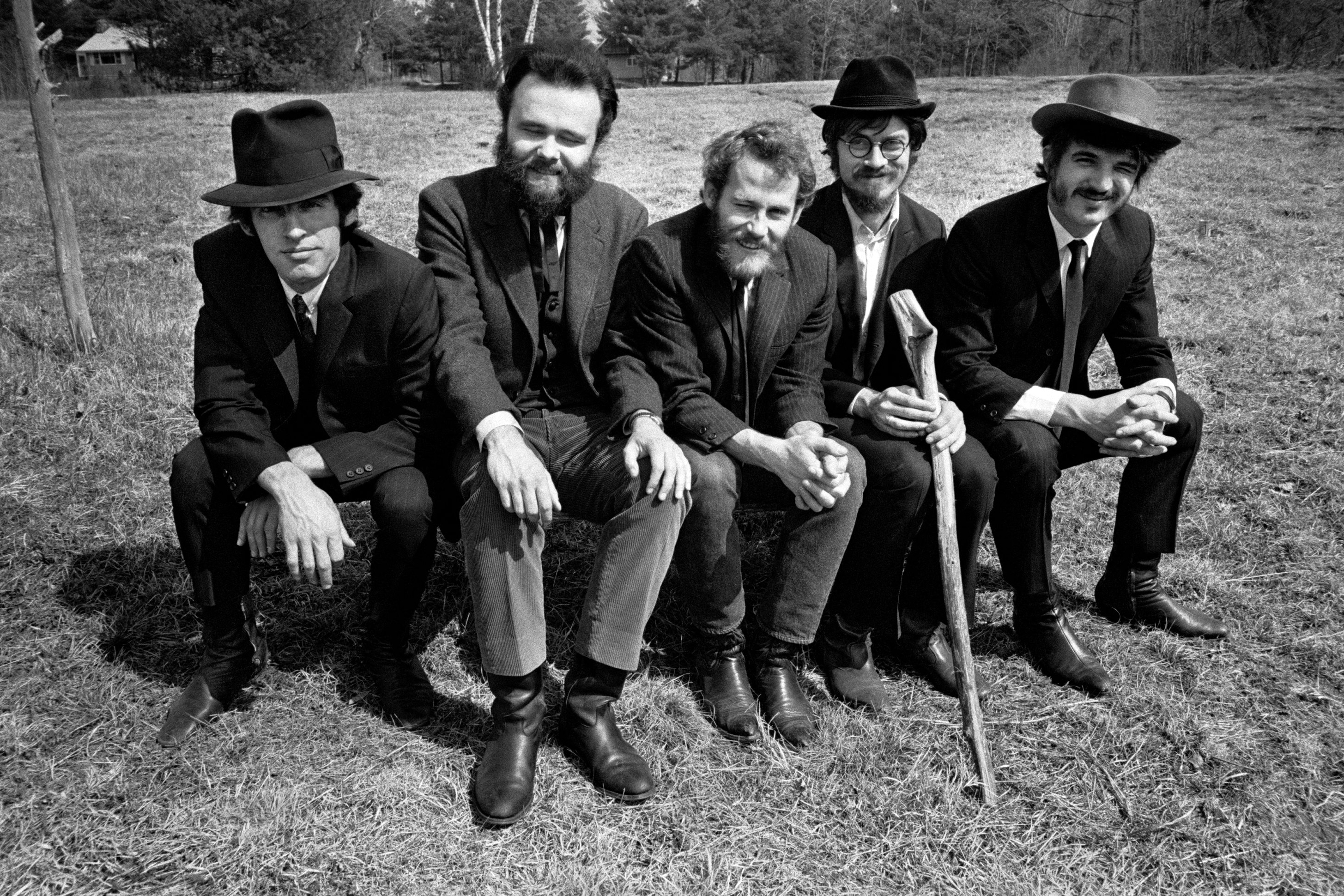
- The Band in 1969. Left to right: Richard Manuel, Garth Hudson, Levon Helm, Robbie Robertson, Rick Danko.

Background information
- Also known as: The Hawks; Levon and the Hawks; Canadian Squires; The Honkies
- Origin: Toronto, Ontario, Canada
- Genres: Americana; roots rock; folk rock; country rock
- Works: Discography
- Years active: 1967–1978; 1983–1999
- Labels: Capitol/EMI; Rhino; Warner Bros.
- Past members: Rick Danko; Levon Helm; Garth Hudson; Richard Manuel; Robbie Robertson; Stan Szelest; Richard Bell; Jim Weider; Randy Ciarlante

The Band (sometimes stylized as the Band or the band) were a Canadian and American band formed in Toronto. It consisted of Canadians Rick Danko (bass guitar, guitar, vocals, fiddle), Garth Hudson (organ, keyboards, accordion, saxophone), Richard Manuel (piano, drums, vocals), and Robbie Robertson (guitar, piano, percussion), and American Levon Helm (drums, vocals, mandolin, guitar, bass guitar). The Band's music combined elements of Americana, folk, rock, R&B, jazz and country. They influenced artists including George Harrison, Elton John, the Grateful Dead, Eric Clapton and Wilco.

Between 1958 and 1963, the band was known as the Hawks and backed Toronto-based rockabilly singer Ronnie Hawkins. In the mid-1960s, they gained recognition for backing Bob Dylan on his 1966 concert tour as his first electric band. After changing their name to "The Band", they released their debut, Music from Big Pink (1968) and its follow-up, The Band (1969), to critical acclaim and commercial success. The Band's most popular songs include "The Weight" (1968), "The Night They Drove Old Dixie Down" and "Up on Cripple Creek" (both 1969). The Band later released Stage Fright (1970), Cahoots (1971), the live album Rock of Ages (1972), the covers album Moondog Matinee (1973) and Northern Lights – Southern Cross (1975).

The Band performed a farewell concert on November 25, 1976. Footage from the event was featured in Martin Scorsese's concert film The Last Waltz (1978). After five years apart, Danko, Hudson, Helm, and Manuel reunited in 1983 for a tour without Robertson. Manuel died in 1986, but the remaining members continued to tour and occasionally released new albums of studio material until Danko's death in 1999, after which the Band broke up for good. The Band was inducted into the Canadian Music Hall of Fame in 1989 and the Rock and Roll Hall of Fame in 1994. In 2004, Rolling Stone ranked them 50th on their list of the 100 Greatest Artists of All Time. The Band received a Grammy Lifetime Achievement Award in 2008 and were inducted into Canada's Walk of Fame in 2014. Their career was chronicled in Once Were Brothers: Robbie Robertson and The Band (2019).

== History ==
=== 1957–1964: The Hawks ===
The future members of the Band first played together as the Hawks, the backing group for rockabilly singer Ronnie Hawkins. Hawkins was popular in and around Toronto and had an effective way of eliminating musical competition: When a promising band appeared, he would hire their best musicians for his own group. Robbie Robertson, Rick Danko, Richard Manuel, and finally Garth Hudson came under his tutelage this way. Levon Helm journeyed with Hawkins from Arkansas to Ontario and began playing with the group in 1957 and became their fulltime drummer after graduating high school in 1958.

In the late 1950s, with Helm and Robertson in his band, Hawkins performed regularly at Pop Ivey's Summer Garden Pavilion in Port Dover, Ontario. In May 1961, he recruited Danko after watching the Simcoe native, who was 17, playing at the Pavilion. At the same venue, Hawkins and other members of the Hawks happened to see Richard Manuel's group, the Revols, perform for the first time. In September 1961, Hawkins convinced Manuel to leave the Revols and join the Hawks.

While most of the Hawks were eager to join Hawkins's group, getting Hudson to join was more difficult. Having earned a college degree, Hudson planned on a career as a music teacher, and was only interested in playing rock music as a hobby. The Hawks admired his wild organ playing and asked him repeatedly to join. Hudson finally agreed, under the condition that the Hawks each pay him $10 per week to be their instructor and purchase a new state-of-the-art Lowrey organ; all music theory questions were directed to Hudson.

There is a view that jazz is 'evil' because it comes from evil people, but actually the greatest priests on 52nd Street, and on the streets of New York City were the musicians. They were doing the greatest healing work. And they knew how to punch through music which would cure and make people feel good.

— Garth Hudson in The Last Waltz

With Hawkins, they recorded a few singles in this period and became known as the best rock group in the thriving Toronto music scene. Hawkins regularly convened all-night rehearsals following long club shows, with the result that the young musicians quickly developed their instrumental skills. In late 1963, the group split from Hawkins over personal differences. They had grown tired of playing the same songs so often and wanted to perform original material, and they were also wary of Hawkins's heavy-handed leadership. He would fine the Hawks if they brought their girlfriends to the clubs (fearing it might reduce the numbers of "available" girls who came to performances) or if they smoked cannabis.

Robertson later said:

Eventually, [Hawkins] built us up to the point where we outgrew his music and had to leave. He shot himself in the foot, really, by sharpening us into such a crackerjack band that we had to go on out into the world, because we knew what his vision was for himself, and we were all younger and more ambitious musically.

The group was briefly known as the Levon Helm Sextet, with a sixth member, saxophonist Jerry Penfound after leaving Hawkins. Then it became Levon and the Hawks after Penfound's departure. In 1965, they released a single on Ware Records under the name the Canadian Squires, but they returned as Levon and the Hawks for a recording session for Atco later that year. Also in 1965, Helm and the band met blues singer and harmonica player Sonny Boy Williamson II. They offered to become his backing band, but Williamson died not long after their meeting.

=== 1965–1967: With Bob Dylan ===
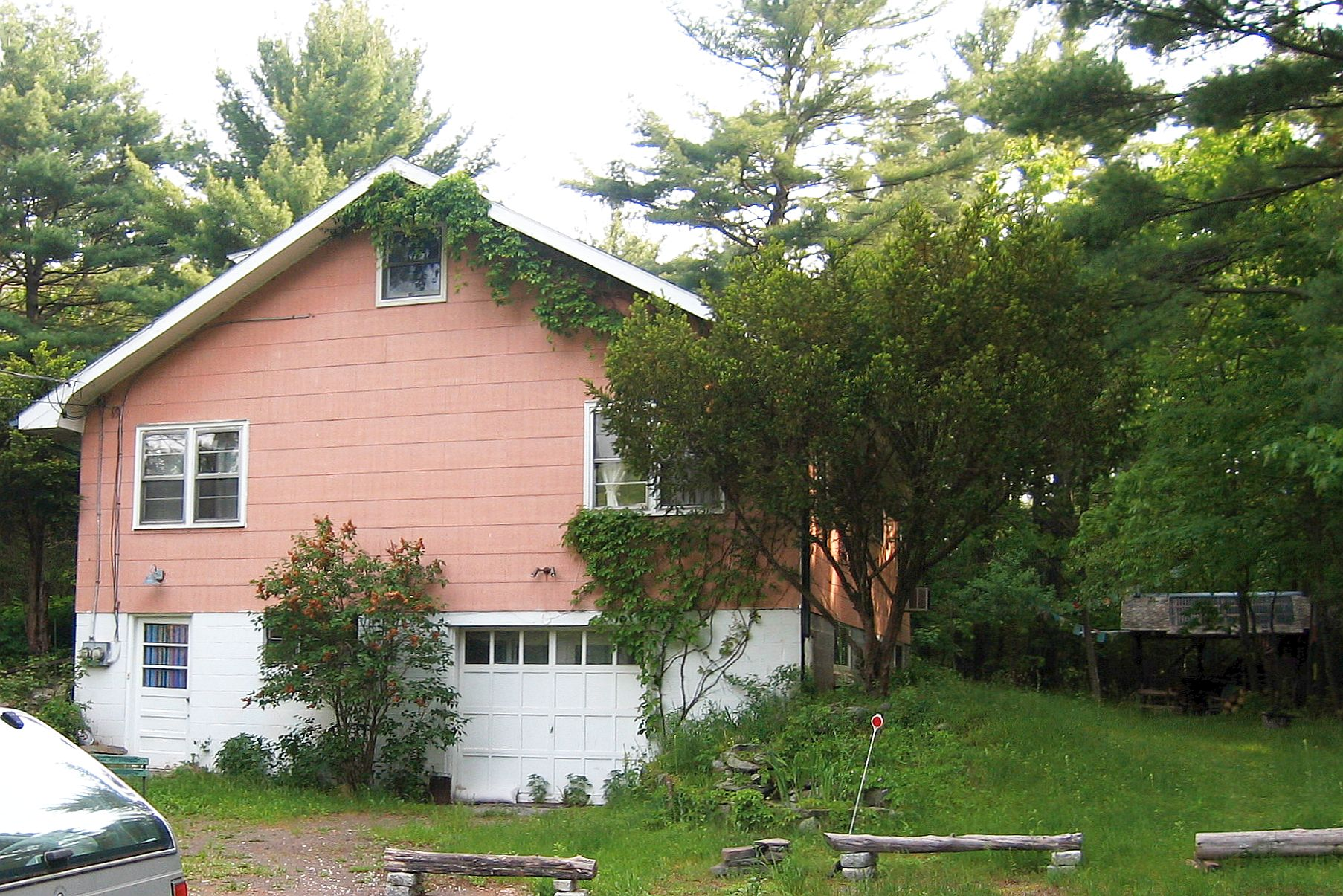
"Big Pink" in 2006

In late summer 1965, Bob Dylan was looking for a backup band for his first U.S. "electric" tour. Levon and the Hawks were recommended by blues singer John P. Hammond, who earlier that year had recorded with Helm, Hudson and Robertson on his album So Many Roads. Around the same time, one of their friends from Toronto, Mary Martin, was working as secretary to Dylan's manager, Albert Grossman. She told Dylan to visit the group at Le Coq d'Or Tavern, a club on Yonge Street in Toronto—though Robertson recollects it was the Friar's Tavern, just down the street. Her advice to Dylan: "You gotta see these guys."

Later in 1965, Dylan hired the group as his backing band for his U.S. tour in 1965 and world tour in 1966. After the 1966 tour, the group moved with help from Dylan and Grossman, to Saugerties, New York, where they made the informal 1967 recordings that became The Basement Tapes. Because they were always referred to simply as "the band" to various frontmen and the locals in Woodstock, Helm said the name "The Band" worked well when the group came into its own. (Note: According to Alan Livingston, who as president of EMI records first signed them in 1968, the group's manager at the time came up with the moniker after Livingston insisted that they give themselves a name.) The group decided on it as their official name and began performing under it from 1968 onward. Dylan continued to collaborate with The Band over the course of their career, most notably in a joint 1974 tour.

After hearing the Band play and meeting with Robertson, Dylan invited Helm and Robertson to join his backing band. After two concerts backing Dylan, Helm and Robertson told Dylan of their loyalty to their bandmates and told him that they would continue with him only if he hired all of the Hawks. Dylan accepted and invited Levon and the Hawks to tour with him. The group was receptive to the offer, knowing it could give them the wider exposure they craved. They thought of themselves as a tightly rehearsed rock and R&B group and knew Dylan mostly from his early acoustic folk music. Furthermore, they had little inkling of how internationally popular Dylan had become.

With Dylan, the Hawks played a series of concerts from September 1965 through May 1966, billed as "Bob Dylan and the Band". The tours were marked by Dylan's reportedly copious use of amphetamines. Some, though not all, of the Hawks joined in the excesses. Most of the concerts were met with heckling and disapproval from folk music purists. Helm was so affected by the negative reception that he left the tour after a little more than one month and sat out the rest of that year's concerts, as well as the world tour in 1966. Helm spent much of this period working on an oil rig in the Gulf of Mexico.

During and between tours, Dylan and the Hawks attempted several recording sessions, but with less than satisfying results. Sessions in October and November yielded just one usable single ("Can You Please Crawl Out Your Window?"), and two days of recording in January 1966 for what was intended to be Dylan's next album, Blonde on Blonde, resulted in "One of Us Must Know (Sooner or Later)", which was released as a single a few weeks later and was subsequently selected for the album. On "One of Us Must Know", Dylan was backed by drummer Bobby Gregg, bassist Danko (or Bill Lee), (Note: The booklet accompanying The Original Mono Recordings reissue of Blonde on Blonde lists Will Lee as the bass player (Marcus, Greil. Album notes for The Original Mono Recordings by Bob Dylan, 2010). Sean Wilentz insists that "the playing and talk on the Blonde on Blonde session tape show conclusively that Danko was the bassist on 'One of Us Must Know' (Wilentz, Sean. Bob Dylan in America, 2009, p. 113).) guitarist Robbie Robertson, pianist Paul Griffin, and Al Kooper (who was more a guitarist than an organist) playing organ. Frustrated by the slow progress in the New York studio, Dylan accepted the suggestion of producer Bob Johnston and moved the recording sessions to Nashville. In Nashville, Robertson's guitar was prominent on the Blonde on Blonde recordings, especially in the song "Leopard-Skin Pill-Box Hat", but the other members of the Hawks did not attend the sessions.

During the European leg of their 1966 world tour, Mickey Jones replaced Sandy Konikoff on drums. Dylan and the Hawks played at the Free Trade Hall in Manchester on May 17, 1966. The gig became legendary when, near the end of Dylan's electric set, an audience member shouted "Judas!" After a pause, Dylan replied, "I don't believe you. You're a liar!" He then turned to the Hawks and said, "Play it fucking loud!" With that, they launched into an acidic version of "Like a Rolling Stone".

The Manchester performance was widely bootlegged (and mistakenly placed at the Royal Albert Hall). In a 1971 review for Creem, critic Dave Marsh wrote:

My response is that crystallization of everything that is rock'n'roll music, at its finest, was to allow my jaw to drop, my body to move, to leap out of the chair ... It is an experience that one desires simply to share, to play over and over again for those he knows thirst for such pleasure. If I speak in an almost worshipful sense about this music, it is not because I have lost perspective, it is precisely because I have found it, within music, yes, that was made five years ago. But it is there and unignorable.

When the concert finally saw an official release as The Bootleg Series Vol. 4: Bob Dylan Live 1966, The "Royal Albert Hall" Concert in 1998, Richie Unterberger declared the record "an important document of rock history."

On July 29, 1966, while on a break from touring, Dylan was injured in a motorcycle accident that precipitated his retreat into semi-seclusion in Woodstock, New York. For a while, the Hawks returned to the bar and roadhouse touring circuit, sometimes backing other singers, including a brief stint with Tiny Tim. Dylan invited the Hawks to join him in Woodstock in February 1967, and Danko, Hudson, and Manuel rented a large pink house, which they named "Big Pink", in nearby West Saugerties, New York. The next month (initially without Helm) they commenced recording a much-bootlegged and influential series of demos, initially at Dylan's house in Woodstock and later at Big Pink, which were released partially on LP as The Basement Tapes in 1975 and in full in 2014. A track-by-track review of the bootleg was detailed by Jann Wenner in Rolling Stone, in which the band members were explicitly named and given the collective name "the Crackers". While Helm was not involved in the initial recording, he did perform in later sessions and in overdubs recorded in 1975 before the album's release.

=== 1968–1972: Initial success ===
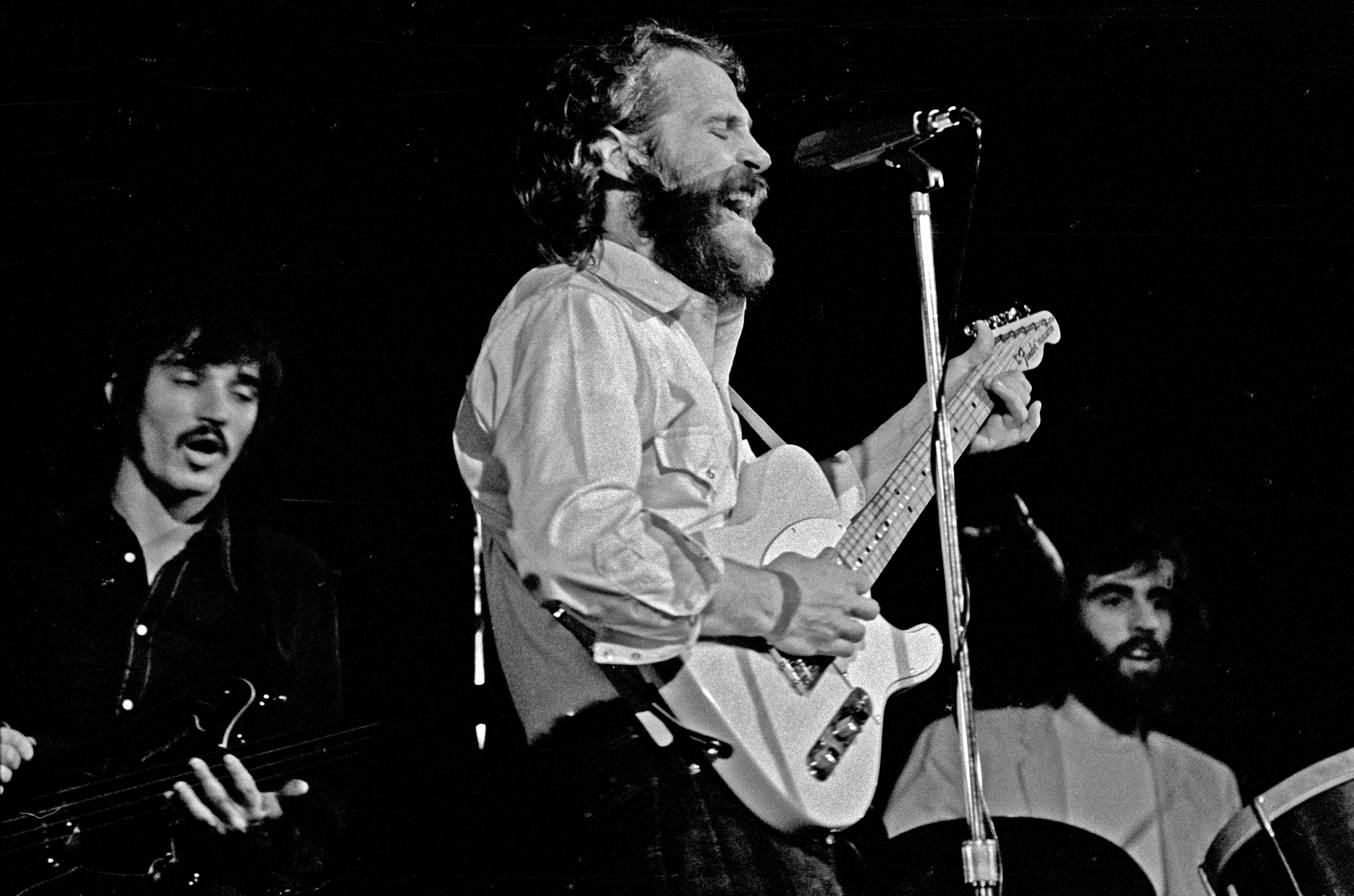
L to R: Danko, Helm and Manuel on tour in Hamburg, Germany, in 1971

The sessions with Dylan ended in October 1967, with Helm having rejoined the group by that time, and the Hawks began writing their own songs at Big Pink. When they went into the recording studio, they still did not have a name for themselves. Stories vary as to the manner in which they ultimately adopted the name "The Band". In The Last Waltz, Manuel claimed that they wanted to call themselves either "The Honkies" or "The Crackers" (which they used when backing Dylan for a January 1968 concert tribute to Woody Guthrie), but these names were vetoed by their record label; Robertson suggests that during their time with Dylan everyone just referred to them as "the band" and the name stuck. Initially they disliked the moniker, but eventually grew to like it, thinking it both humble and presumptuous. In 1969, Rolling Stone referred to them as "the band from Big Pink".

Their debut album, Music from Big Pink (1968), was widely acclaimed. It included three songs co-written with Dylan ("This Wheel's on Fire", "Tears of Rage" and "I Shall Be Released") as well as "The Weight", which became one of their best-known songs after it was used in Easy Rider (1969). While a thematic continuity ran through the music, the style varied from song to song. Al Aronowitz called it "country soul... a sound never heard before".

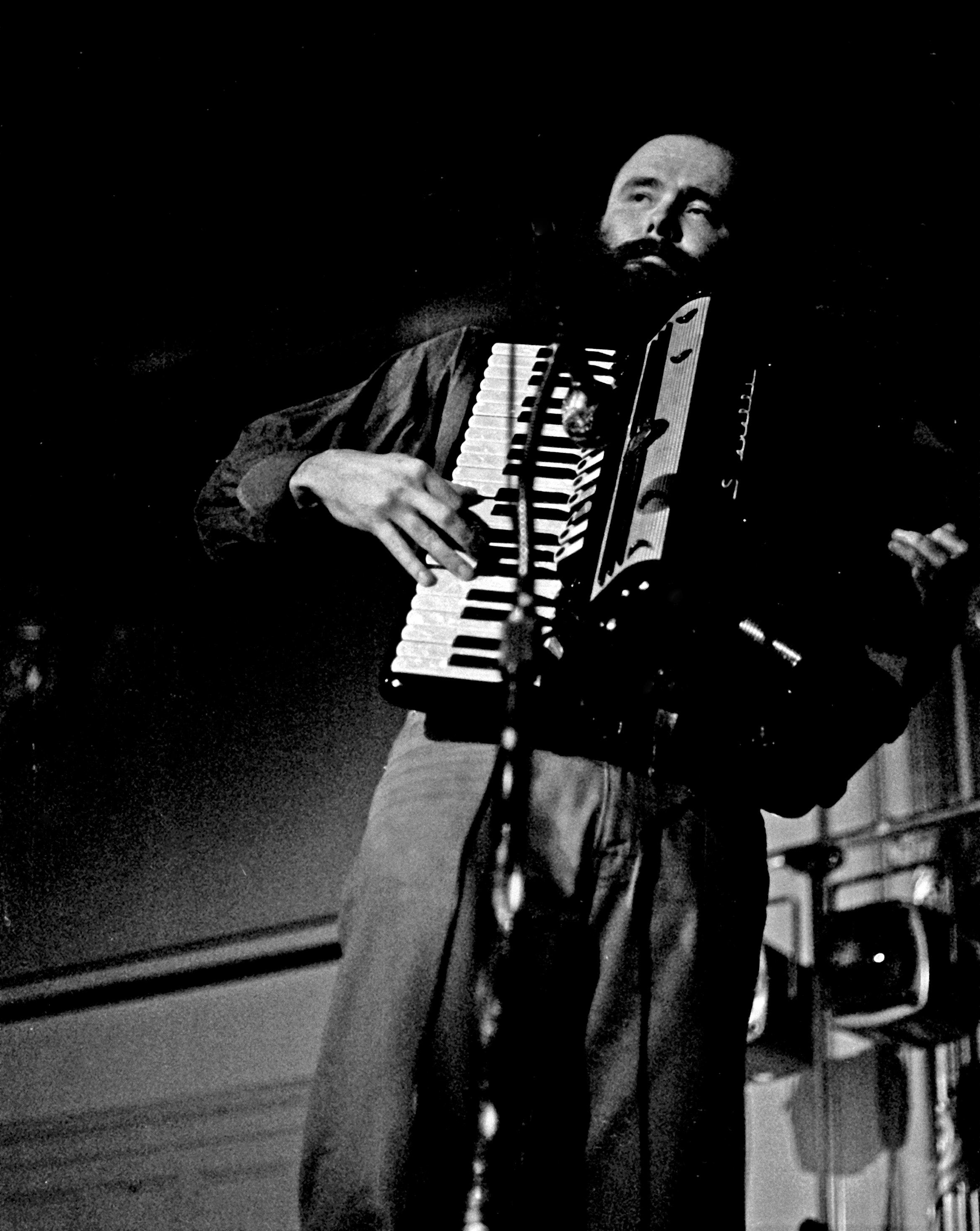
Hudson in 1971

In early 1969, after the success of Music from Big Pink, the Band went on tour, starting with an appearance at Winterland Ballroom in San Francisco. They performed at the Woodstock Festival (their performance was not in the Woodstock film because of legal complications), and later that year performed with Dylan at the UK Isle of Wight Festival (several songs from which were subsequently included on Dylan's Self Portrait album). That same year, they left for Los Angeles to record their follow-up, The Band (1969). From their rustic appearance on the cover to the songs and arrangements within, the album stood in contrast to other popular music of the day. Several other artists had already made similar stylistic moves, notably Dylan, on John Wesley Harding (1967), which was written during the Basement Tapes sessions, and the Byrds, on Sweetheart of the Rodeo (1968), which featured two Basement Tapes covers. The Band featured songs that evoked old-time rural America, from the Civil War in "The Night They Drove Old Dixie Down" to the unionization of farm workers in "King Harvest (Has Surely Come)".

These first two records were produced by John Simon, who was practically a group member: he aided in arrangements in addition to playing occasional piano and tuba. Simon reported that he was often asked about the distinctive horn sections featured effectively on the first two albums: people wanted to know how they had achieved such memorable sounds. Simon stated that, besides Hudson (an accomplished saxophonist), the others had only rudimentary horn skills, and achieved their sound simply by creatively using their limited technique.

The Band was the first rock group after the Beatles to be featured on the cover of Time magazine. David Attie's unused photographs for this cover—among the very few studio portraits taken during the Band's prime—have only recently been discovered, and were featured in Harvey Kubernik and Ken Kubernik's The Story of The Band: From Big Pink to The Last Waltz"'.

A critical and commercial triumph, The Band, along with works by the Byrds and the Flying Burrito Brothers, established a musical template for folk rock. Both Big Pink and The Band influenced their musical contemporaries. Eric Clapton and George Harrison cited the Band as a major influence on their musical direction in the late 1960s and early 1970s. Clapton later revealed that he wanted to join the group. While he never did join, he recruited all of the members of the Band as well as other roots rock performers for his 1976 album No Reason to Cry.

After their second album, the Band embarked on their first tour as a lead act. The anxiety of fame was clear, as the group's songs turned to darker themes of fear and alienation: the influence on their next work is self-explanatory. Stage Fright (1970) was engineered by musician-engineer-producer Todd Rundgren and recorded on stage at the iconic Woodstock Playhouse. As with their previous, self-titled record, Robertson was credited with most of the songwriting. Initial critical reaction was positive, but it was seen as a disappointment from the previous two albums for various reasons. After recording Stage Fright, the Band was among the acts participating in the Festival Express, an all-star rock concert tour of Canada by train that also included Janis Joplin, the Grateful Dead and future Band member Richard Bell (at the time he was a member of Joplin's band). In the concert documentary film, released in 2003, Danko can be seen participating in a drunken jam session with Jerry Garcia, Bob Weir, John Dawson, and Joplin while singing "Ain't No More Cane".

About that time, Robertson began exerting greater control over the Band, a point of contention between him and Helm. Helm charged Robertson with greed, while Robertson suggested that he made increased efforts to guide the group in part because Danko, Helm, and Manuel were becoming more unreliable due to their heroin usage. Robertson insists he did his best to coax Manuel into writing more songs, only to see him descend into addiction.

Despite mounting problems among the group members, the Band forged ahead with their next album, Cahoots (1971), featuring, "4% Pantomime" (with Van Morrison), and "Life Is a Carnival", with a horn arrangement by Allen Toussaint. Toussaint's contribution was a critical addition to the Band's next project, and the group would later record two songs written by Toussaint: "Holy Cow" on Moondog Matinee and "You See Me" on Jubilation. In late December 1971, the Band recorded the live album Rock of Ages, which was released in the summer of 1972. On Rock of Ages, they were bolstered by the addition of a horn section, with arrangements written by Toussaint. Dylan appeared on stage on New Year's Eve and performed four songs with the group, including a version of Dylan's "When I Paint My Masterpiece".

=== 1973–1975: Move to Shangri-La ===
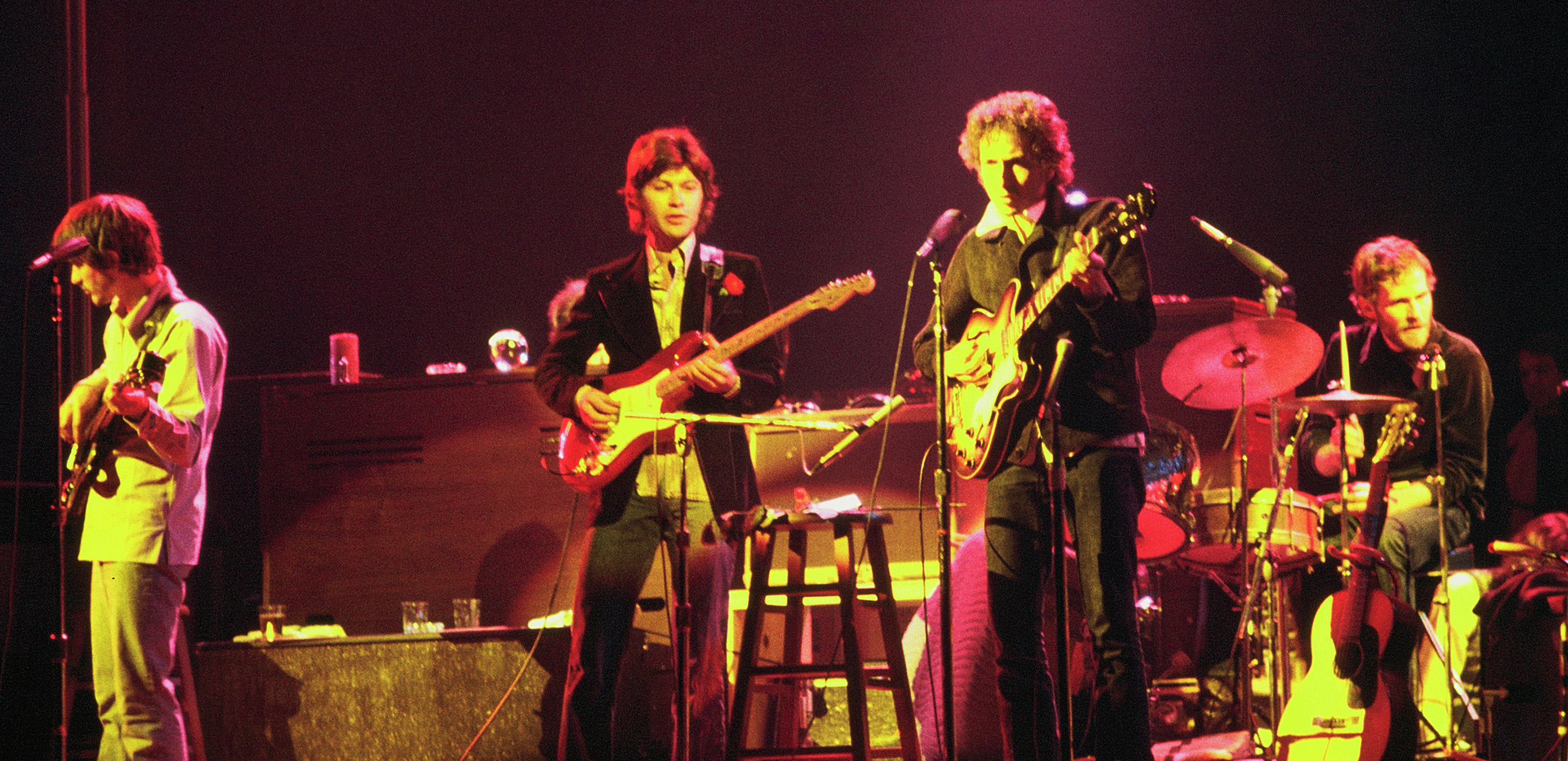
Bob Dylan and The Band in Chicago, 1974: (left to right) Danko, Robertson, Dylan and Helm

In 1973, the Band released the covers album Moondog Matinee. There was no tour in support of the album, which garnered mixed reviews. However, on July 28, 1973, they played at Summer Jam at Watkins Glen, a massive concert that took place at the Grand Prix Raceway outside Watkins Glen, New York. The event, which was attended by over 600,000 fans, also featured the Grateful Dead and the Allman Brothers Band. It was during the event that discussions began about a possible tour with Bob Dylan. By late 1973, Danko, Helm, Hudson and Manuel had joined them, and the first order of business was backing Dylan on his album Planet Waves. The album was released concurrently with their joint 1974 tour, in which they played 40 shows in North America during January and February 1974. Later that year, the tour was documented on the live album Before the Flood.

During that time, the Band brought in Planet Waves producer Rob Fraboni to help design a music studio for the group. By 1975, the studio, Shangri-La, was completed. That year, the Band recorded and released Northern Lights – Southern Cross, their first album of new material since 1971. All eight songs were written solely by Robertson. Despite comparatively poor record sales, the album is favored by critics and fans. Helm regards this album highly in his book, This Wheel's on Fire: "It was the best album we had done since The Band." The album also produced more experimentation from Hudson, switching to synthesizers, showcased on "Jupiter Hollow".

=== 1976–1978: The Last Waltz ===
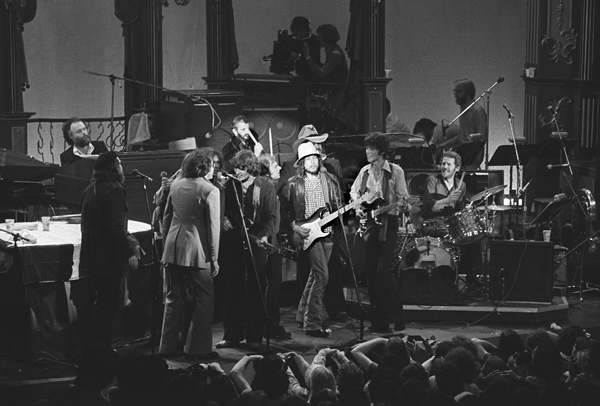
The Band with guests at the Last Waltz concert. Photo: David Gans

By the mid-1970s, Robbie Robertson was weary of touring. After Northern Lights – Southern Cross failed to meet commercial expectations, much of the group's 1976 tour was confined to theaters and smaller arenas in secondary markets (including the Santa Cruz Civic Auditorium, the Long Island Arena and the Champlain Valley Expo in Essex Junction, Vermont), culminating in an opening slot for the ascendant ZZ Top at the Nashville Fairgrounds in September. In early September, Richard Manuel suffered a severe neck injury in a boating accident in Texas, prompting Robertson to urge the Band to retire from live performances after staging a "farewell concert" known as The Last Waltz. Following an October 30 appearance on Saturday Night Live, the event, including turkey dinner for the audience of 5,000, was held on Thanksgiving Day, 1976 at the Winterland Ballroom. and featured a horn section with arrangements by Toussaint and an all-star lineup of guests, including Joni Mitchell and Neil Young. Two of the guests were fundamental to the Band's existence and growth: Ronnie Hawkins and Bob Dylan. Other guests they admired (and in most cases had worked with before) included Muddy Waters, Dr. John, Ringo Starr, Eric Clapton, Ron Wood, Bobby Charles, Neil Diamond, and Paul Butterfield. The concert was filmed by Robertson's friend Martin Scorsese.

In 1977, the Band released their seventh studio album Islands, which fulfilled their record contract with Capitol so that a planned Last Waltz film and album could be released on the Warner Bros. label. Islands contained a mix of originals and covers, and was the last with the Band's original lineup. Also in 1977, the group recorded soundstage performances with country singer Emmylou Harris ("Evangeline") and gospel-soul group the Staple Singers ("The Weight"); Scorsese combined these new performances—as well as interviews he had conducted with the group—with the 1976 concert footage. The resulting concert film was released in 1978, along with a three-LP soundtrack.

Helm later wrote about The Last Waltz in his autobiography:

I made my big statement. I did the movie, I made a three-record album about it—and if this is only my statement, not theirs, I'll accept that. They're saying, "Well, that was really his trip, not our trip." Well, fine. I'll take the best music film that's ever been made, and make it my statement. I don't have any problems with that. None at all.

The original quintet performed together one last time: on March 1, 1978 after the late set of a Rick Danko solo show at The Roxy, the group performed "Stage Fright", "The Shape I'm In", and "The Weight" for an encore.

=== 1983–1989: Reformation and the death of Richard Manuel ===
The Band resumed touring in 1983 without Robertson. An accomplished musician from Woodstock, New York, Jim Weider, became lead guitarist. Robertson had found success with a solo career and as a Hollywood music producer. As a result of their diminished popularity, they performed in theaters and clubs as headliners and took support slots in larger venues for onetime peers such as the Grateful Dead and Crosby, Stills and Nash.

After a performance in Winter Park, Florida on March 4, 1986, Manuel hanged himself, aged 42, in his motel room. He had suffered for many years from alcoholism and drug addiction and had been clean and sober for several years beginning in 1978 but had begun drinking and using drugs again by 1984. Manuel's position as pianist was filled by old friend Stan Szelest (who died not long after) and then by Richard Bell. Bell had played with Ronnie Hawkins after the departure of the original Hawks, and was best known from his days as a member of Janis Joplin's Full Tilt Boogie Band.

The Band was inducted into the Canadian Music Hall of Fame at the 1989 Juno Awards, where Robertson was reunited with original members Danko and Hudson. With Canadian country rock superstars Blue Rodeo as a back-up band, Music Express called the 1989 Juno appearance a symbolic "passing of the torch" from the Band to Blue Rodeo.

=== 1990–1999: Final recording and death of Rick Danko ===
In 1990, Capitol Records began to re-release the records from the 1970s. The remaining three members continued to tour and record albums with a succession of musicians filling Manuel's and Robertson's roles. The Band appeared at Bob Dylan's 30th anniversary concert in New York City in October 1992, where they performed their version of Dylan's "When I Paint My Masterpiece". In 1993, the group released their eighth studio album, Jericho. Jericho was their first album recorded since The Last Waltz, and also their first studio album since |Islands. Without Robbie Robertson as primary lyricist, much of the songwriting for the album came from outside of the group. Also in the same year, the Band, along with Ronnie Hawkins, Bob Dylan, and other performers appeared at Bill Clinton's 1993 "Blue Jean Bash" inauguration party.

In 1994, the Band performed at Woodstock '94. Later in 1994, Robertson appeared with Danko and Hudson as the Band for the second time since the original group broke up. The occasion was the induction of the Band into the Rock and Roll Hall of Fame. Helm, who had been at odds with Robertson for years over accusations of stolen songwriting credits, did not attend. In February 1996, the Band and the Crickets recorded "Not Fade Away", released on the tribute album Not Fade Away (Remembering Buddy Holly). The Band released two more albums after Jericho: High on the Hog (1996) and Jubilation (1998), the latter of which included guest appearances by Eric Clapton and John Hiatt. Helm was diagnosed with throat cancer in 1998 and was unable to sing for several years but he eventually regained the use of his voice. In 1998, the group revealed they were working on a follow-up album to Jubilation that has not been released.

The final song the group recorded together was their 1999 version of Bob Dylan's "One Too Many Mornings", which they contributed to the Dylan tribute album Tangled Up in Blues. On December 10, 1999, Rick Danko died in his sleep at the age of 55. Following his death, the Band broke up for good. The final configuration of the group included Richard Bell (piano), Randy Ciarlante (drums), and Jim Weider (guitar).

=== Later developments ===
In 2002, Robertson bought all other former members' financial interests in the group (with the exception of Helm's), giving him major control of the presentation of the group's material, including latter-day compilations.

Richard Bell died of multiple myeloma in June 2007.

The Band received a Lifetime Achievement Grammy Award on February 9, 2008, but there was no reunion of former members. In honor of the event, Helm held a Midnight Ramble in Woodstock.

Levon Helm died at the age of 71 on April 19, 2012, after a prolonged battle with throat cancer.

Robbie Robertson died at the age of 80 on August 9, 2023, after battling prostate cancer.

Garth Hudson, the last living original member of the Band, died at the age of 87 on January 21, 2025.

== Musical style ==
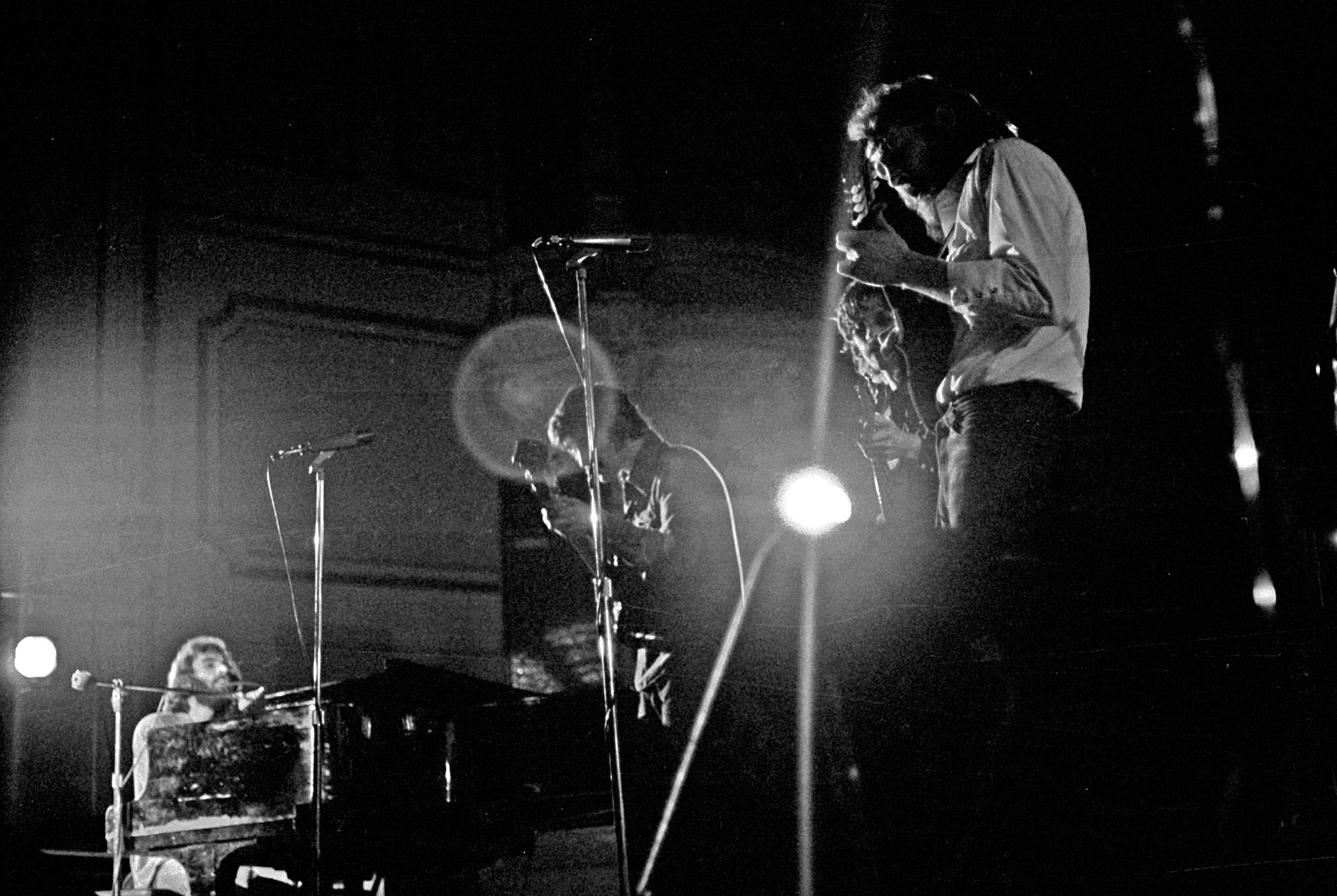
The Band in Hamburg, 1971: (left to right) Manuel, Danko, Robertson, and Helm

The Band's style "thematically and musically fuse[d] the past and the present" by combining various genres. Although primarily incorporating old country music and early rock and roll, the rhythm section often was reminiscent of Stax- or Motown-style rhythm and blues, and Robertson cites Curtis Mayfield and the Staple Singers as major influences, resulting in a synthesis of many musical genres. Singers Manuel, Danko, and Helm each brought a distinctive voice to the Band: Helm's Southern accent was prevalent in his raw and powerful vocals, Danko sang tenor with a distinctively choppy enunciation, and Manuel alternated between falsetto and a soulful baritone. The singers regularly blended singing harmonies. Though the singing was more or less evenly shared among the three, both Danko and Helm have stated that they saw Manuel as the Band's "lead" singer.

Every member was a multi-instrumentalist. There was little instrument-switching when they played live, but when recording, the musicians could make up different configurations in service of the songs. Hudson in particular was able to coax a wide range of timbres from his Lowrey organ. Helm's drumming was often praised: critic Jon Carroll declared that Helm was "the only drummer who can make you cry," while prolific session drummer Jim Keltner admits to appropriating several of Helm's techniques. Producer John Simon is often cited as a "sixth member" of the Band for producing and playing on Music from Big Pink, co-producing and playing on The Band, and playing on other songs up through the Band's 1993 reunion album Jericho.

== Copyright controversy ==
Robertson is credited as writer or co-writer of the majority of the Band's songs and, as a result, has received most of the songwriting royalties generated from the music. That developed into a point of contention, especially for Helm. In his 1993 autobiography, This Wheel's on Fire: Levon Helm and the Story of The Band, Helm disputed the validity of the songwriting credits as listed on the albums and explained that the Band's songs were developed in collaboration with all members. Danko concurred with Helm:

I think Levon's book hits the nail on the head about where Robbie and Albert Grossman and some of those people went wrong and when The Band stopped being The Band... I'm truly friends with everybody but, hey—it could happen to Levon, too. When people take themselves too seriously and believe too much in their own bullshit, they usually get in trouble.

Robertson denied that Helm had written any of the songs attributed to Robertson. Furthermore, the songs recorded by Levon Helm as a solo artist were almost entirely written by others. For the albums Levon Helm (1978), American Son, Levon Helm (1982), Dirt Farmer, and Electric Dirt he rarely participated in songwriting.

== Legacy ==
The Band was inducted into the Canadian Music Hall of Fame in 1989 and the Rock and Roll Hall of Fame in 1994. In 2008, the group received the Grammy Lifetime Achievement Award and in 2014, they were inducted into Canada's Walk of Fame.

The Band "ushered in the roots-rock of the '70s, embodying Americana in a way that no one else has approached," according to Mark Deming of AllMusic. He further explained:

Their work reflected the influences of country, blues, folk, and other forms of American roots music in a way that was fresh, organic, and innovative, and showed a creative maturity that was a revelation in the psychedelic era.

Music critic Bruce Eder said that the Band as "one of the most popular and influential rock groups in the world, their music embraced by critics... as seriously as the music of the Beatles and the Rolling Stones." Pink Floyd's Roger Waters called Music From the Big Pink the "second most influential record in the history of rock and roll",

The Band has influenced numerous artists, including the Grateful Dead, Eric Clapton, George Harrison, Crosby, Stills, Nash & Young, Led Zeppelin, Elvis Costello, Elton John, Phish, and Pink Floyd. In his introduction of the Band during the Bob Dylan 30th Anniversary Concert, Clapton announced that in 1968 he had heard Music From the Big Pink, "and it changed my life." The band Nazareth took their name from a line in "The Weight". Guitarist Richard Thompson has acknowledged the album's influence on Fairport Convention's Liege and Lief, and journalist John Harris has asserted that the Band's debut also influenced the spirit of the Beatles' back-to-basics album Let It Be as well as the Rolling Stones' string of roots-infused albums that began with Beggars Banquet. (Note: The recording sessions for Beggars Banquet, however, wrapped up in the same month that Music from Big Pink was released.) George Harrison said that his song "All Things Must Pass" was heavily influenced by the Band and that, while writing the song, he imagined Levon Helm singing it. Meanwhile, "The Weight" has been covered numerous times, and in various styles. In a 1969 interview, Robbie Robertson remarked on the group's influence:

We certainly didn't want everybody to go out and get a banjo and a fiddle player. We were trying to calm things down a bit though. What we're going to do now is go to Muscle Shoals, Alabama, and record four sides, four psychedelic songs. Total freak-me songs. Just to show that we have no hard feelings. Just pretty good rock and roll.

In the 1990s, a new generation of bands influenced by the Band began to gain popularity, including Counting Crows, the Wallflowers, and the Black Crowes. Counting Crows indicated this influence with their tribute to Richard Manuel, "If I Could Give All My Love (Richard Manuel Is Dead)", from their album Hard Candy. The Black Crowes frequently cover songs by the Band during live performances, such as "The Night They Drove Old Dixie Down", which appears on Freak 'n' Roll into the Fog. They have also recorded at Helm's studio in Woodstock.

The Hold Steady was formed after members Craig Finn and Tad Kubler watched The Last Waltz. Rick Danko and Robbie Robertson are name-checked in the lyrics of "The Swish" from the Hold Steady's 2004 debut album Almost Killed Me. That year, southern rock-revivalists Drive-By Truckers released the Jason Isbell penned track "Danko/Manuel" on the album The Dirty South.

The Band also inspired Grace Potter to form Grace Potter and the Nocturnals in 2002. In an interview with the Montreal Gazette, Potter said:

The Band blew my mind. I thought if this is what Matt [Burr] meant when he said "Let's start a rock 'n' roll band,"... that was the kind of rock 'n' roll band I could believe in.

A tribute album, entitled Endless Highway: The Music of The Band (2007) included contributions from My Morning Jacket, Death Cab for Cutie, Gomez, Guster, Bruce Hornsby, Jack Johnson, Animal Liberation Orchestra, Lee Ann Womack, the Allman Brothers Band, Blues Traveler, Jakob Dylan, Rosanne Cash, and others.

Members of Wilco, Clap Your Hands Say Yeah, the Shins, Dr Dog, Yellowbirds, Ween, Furthur, and other bands staged The Complete Last Waltz in 2012 and 2013. Their performances included all 41 songs from the original 1976 concert in sequence, even those edited out of the film. Musical director Sam Cohen of Yellowbirds claims "the movie is pretty ingrained in me. I've watched it probably 100 times."

An incarnation of the Band's legacy, the Weight Band, originated inside the barn of Levon Helm in 2012 when Jim Weider and Randy Ciarlante, both former members of the Band were performing "Songs of the Band" with Garth Hudson, Jimmy Vivino and Byron Isaacs. In July 2017, PBS's Infinity Hall Live program began airing a televised performance by The Weight Band, featuring Band covers and new music by the band. Every year on the Wednesday before and the Friday after Thanksgiving, Dayton, Ohio NPR affiliate WYSO and The Dayton Art Institute host a tribute to The Last Waltz. Frequently selling out, the show features more than 30 local musicians. A similar event takes place annually in Madison, Wisconsin, on the Saturday night after Thanksgiving.

The Band are the subjects of Once Were Brothers: Robbie Robertson and The Band, which premiered at the 2019 Toronto International Film Festival. The Band is the subject of an extensive historical podcast, The Band: A History, currently covering the entire history of the group.

In 2004, Rolling Stone ranked "The Weight" 41st on its list of the "500 Greatest Songs of All Time". and the Band 50th on its list of the "100 Greatest Artists of All Time". Lucinda Williams wrote:

I remember when Music From Big Pink came out, in 1968. I was living in Arkansas at the time. You couldn't categorize the Band's sound, but it was so organic — a little bit country, a little bit roots, a little bit mountain, a little bit rock — and their vocal styles and harmonies totally set them apart. Each member brought something, because they were all consummate musicians. ... There is an element of sadness about the Band. The Last Waltz, despite its wonderful music, was sad to see because they had so much more to give. Richard Manuel's death was really tragic. I got to meet Garth Hudson when he played on a demo I did back in the mid-Eighties. I just remember he was really quiet, soft-spoken and real sweet. And he played like an angel.

== Members ==
=== Classic lineup ===
- Rick Danko – bass guitar, vocals, guitar, double bass, fiddle (1965–1977, 1983–1999; his death)
- Garth Hudson – organ, keyboards, saxophone, accordion, woodwinds, brass (1965–1977, 1983–1999; died 2025)
- Levon Helm – drums, vocals, mandolin, guitar, percussion, bass guitar (1967–1977, 1983–1999; died 2012)
- Richard Manuel – piano, vocals, keyboards, drums (1965–1977, 1983–1986; his death)
- Robbie Robertson – guitars, occasional vocals, percussion, piano (1965–1977; died 2023)

=== Other members ===
- Jim Weider – guitar, backing vocals, bass, mandolin (1985–1999)
- Stan Szelest – keyboards (1990–1991; his death)
- Randy Ciarlante – drums, percussion, vocals (1990–1999)
- Richard Bell – keyboards (1992–1999; died 2007)

=== Additional musicians ===
- John Simon – baritone horn, electric piano, piano, tenor saxophone, tuba (1968–1976, 1993)
- Terry Cagle – drums, backing vocals (1983–1985, 1986–1989; died 2023)
- Earl Cate – guitars (1983–1985)
- Ernie Cate – keyboards (1983–1985)
- Ron Eoff – bass (1983–1985)
- Fred Carter, Jr. – guitars (1986–1987; died 2010)
- Buddy Cage – pedal steel guitar (1986; died 2020)
- Jack Casady – bass (1986)
- Blondie Chaplin – guitars, drums, backing vocals (1986)
- Jorma Kaukonen – guitars (1986)
- Sredni Vollmer – harmonica (1986, 1990–1991; died 2013)
- Billy Preston – keyboards, backing vocals (1991; died 2006)
- Aaron L. Hurwitz – accordion, organ, piano (1992–1999)

== Discography ==
- Music from Big Pink (1968)
- The Band (1969)
- Stage Fright (1970)
- Cahoots (1971)
- Rock of Ages (live, 1972)
- Moondog Matinee (1973)
- Northern Lights – Southern Cross (1975)
- Islands (1977)
- The Last Waltz (live/soundtrack, 1978)
- Jericho (1993)
- High on the Hog (1996)
- Jubilation (1998)

with Bob Dylan

- Planet Waves (1974)
- Before the Flood (live, 1974)
- The Basement Tapes (1975)

== See also ==
- American rock – Overview of rock music in the United States
- Canadian rock – Canadian contributions to rock music
- Cate Brothers – American band
- Music of Canada
- Music of the United States
- Ringo Starr & His All-Starr Band – English rock supergroup
