= The Band discography =

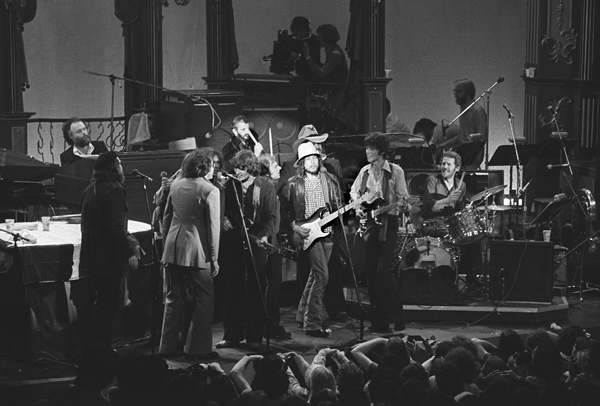
- The Band and friends during The Last Waltz
- Studio albums: 10
- Live albums: 9
- Compilation albums: 10
- Singles: 33
- Video albums: 8
- Collaborative albums: 9

The discography of the Band, a rock group, consists of ten studio albums, nine live albums, nine compilation albums, and thirty-three singles, as well as two studio and two live albums in collaboration with Bob Dylan. They were active from 1964 to 1976, and from 1983 to 1999.

Since 1990, Capitol Records has re-released and expanded upon the versions of the early albums.

== Studio albums ==
List of albums, with selected chart positions
Title	Album details	Peak chart positions							Certifications
Title	Album details	CAN	AUS	NLD	NOR	SWE	UK	US	Certifications
Music from Big Pink	Released: July 1, 1968; Label: Capitol; Format: LP, 8T, CS	18	—	—	—	—	—	30	RIAA: Gold
The Band	Released: September 22, 1969; Label: Capitol; Format: LP, 8T, CS	2	18	—	15	—	25	9	RIAA: Platinum
Stage Fright	Released: August 17, 1970; Label: Capitol; Format: LP, 8T, CS	6	2	5	9	—	15	5	RIAA: Gold
Cahoots	Released: September 15, 1971; Label: Capitol; Format: LP, 8T, CS	15	—	2	20	13	41	21	
Moondog Matinee	Released: October 15, 1973; Label: Capitol; Format: LP, 8T, CS	19	—	—	—	—	—	28	
Northern Lights – Southern Cross	Released: November 1, 1975; Label: Capitol; Format: LP, 8T, CS	27	—	13	—	—	—	26	
Islands	Released: March 15, 1977; Label: Capitol; Format: LP, 8T, CS	—	—	18	—	—	—	64	
Jericho	Released: November 2, 1993; Label: Rhino/Pyramid; Format: CS, CD, LP	50	—	—	—	—	—	166	
High on the Hog	Released: February 27, 1996; Label: Rhino; Format: CS, CD, LP	—	—	—	—	—	—	—	
Jubilation	Released: September 15, 1998; Label: Compendia/River North; Format: CS, CD, LP	—	—	—	—	—	—	—	
"—" denotes releases that did not chart.

=== With Bob Dylan ===
Title	Album details	Peak chart positions							Certifications
Title	Album details	CAN	AUT	FIN	NLD	NOR	NZ	US	Certifications
Planet Waves	Released: January 17, 1974; Label: Asylum / Island; Format: LP, 8T, CS, CD	1	4	16	7	5	—	1	RIAA: Gold
The Basement Tapes	Released: June 26, 1975; Label: Columbia; Format: LP, 8T, CS, CD	15	—	17	—	5	18	7	RIAA: Gold
"—" denotes releases that did not chart.

== Live albums ==
List of albums, with selected chart positions
Title	Album details	Peak chart positions										Certifications
Title	Album details	CAN	AUS	AUT	FIN	GER	NLD	NOR	NZ	SWE	US	Certifications
Rock of Ages	Released: August 15, 1972; Label: Capitol; Format: LP, 8T, CS, CD	4	15	—	—	—	3	—	—	14	6	RIAA: Gold
The Last Waltz	Released: April 7, 1978; Label: Warner Bros.; Format: LP, 8T, CS, CD	13	—	23	19	13	13	15	8	24	16	MC: Gold; RIAA: Gold
Live at Watkins Glen	Released: April 4, 1995; Label: Capitol; Format: CD	—	—	—	—	—	—	—	—	—	—	
The Last Waltz (Box set)	Released: April 16, 2002; Label: Warner Bros./Rhino; Format: CD	—	—	—	—	—	—	—	—	—	—	
Live in Tokyo 1983 (with the Cate Brothers Band)	Released: March 30, 2010; Label: Immortal; Format: CD	—	—	—	—	—	—	—	—	—	—	
Live at the Academy of Music 1971	Released: September 17, 2013; Label: Capitol/UMe; Format: CD	—	—	—	—	—	—	—	—	—	—	
Carter Barron Amphitheater Washington DC, July 17th, 1976	Released: June 24, 2014; Label: Keyhole; Format: CD, LP	—	—	—	—	—	—	—	—	—	—	
Palladium Circles: The Classic NYC Broadcast 1976	Released: March 10, 2015; Label: Iconography; Format: CD	—	—	—	—	—	—	—	—	—	—	
And Then There Were Four: FM Broadcast, Chicago 1983	Released: October 16, 2015; Label: All Access; Format: CD	—	—	—	—	—	—	—	—	—	—	
"—" denotes releases that did not chart.

=== With Bob Dylan ===
Year	Album	Chart positions		Certifications
Year	Album	CAN	US	Certifications
1974	Before the Flood	5	3	RIAA: Platinum
1998	The Bootleg Series Vol. 4: Bob Dylan; Live 1966, The "Royal Albert Hall" Concert	50	31	RIAA: Gold

== Compilation albums ==
Year	Album	Chart positions		Certifications
Year	Album	CAN	US	Certifications
1976	The Best of The Band	35	51	RIAA: Gold
1978	Anthology	—	—	
1989	To Kingdom Come: The Definitive Collection	—	—	
1994	Across the Great Divide (Box set)	—	—	
1999	The Best of The Band, Vol. II	—	—	
2000	Greatest Hits	—	83	
2005	A Musical History (Box set)	—	—	
2007	The Best of the Band: A Musical History	—	—	
2013	Collected (NL) 3CD+DVD,57 Tracks DVD Leo Blokhuis	—	—	
2015	Icon	—	—	

== Other appearances ==
=== Studio ===
Year	Song	Album
1995	"Young Blood"	Till the Night Is Gone: A Tribute to Doc Pomus
1996	"Not Fade Away"	Not Fade Away (Remembering Buddy Holly)
1999	"One Too Many Mornings"	Tangled Up in Blues

=== Live ===
Year	Song(s)	Album
1972	"I Ain't Got No Home", "Dear Mrs. Roosevelt" and "The Grand Coulee Dam"	A Tribute to Woody Guthrie
1993	"When I Paint My Masterpiece"	The 30th Anniversary Concert Celebration

== Guest appearances ==
Year	Song(s)	Artist	Album
1970	"Like a Rolling Stone", "Quinn the Eskimo", "Minstrel Boy" and "She Belongs to Me"	Bob Dylan	Self Portrait
1973	"Sunshine Life for Me (Sail Away Raymond)"	Ringo Starr	Ringo
1977	All members play on various songs.	Rick Danko	Rick Danko
1995	"Remedy", "The Weight" and "Rock 'N' Roll Shoes"	Ronnie Hawkins	Let It Rock
1996	"Great Drives Theme"	N/A	Great Drives episode "Highway 61, revisited"
1997	All members play on various songs.	Tom Pacheco	Woodstock Winter
1997	"Deuce and a Quarter"	Scotty Moore & D.J. Fontana	All the King's Men
1998	All members play on various songs.	Jim Weider and the Honky Tonk Gurus	Big Foot
1999	"Yankee Swamp"	Artie Traum	Meetings with Remarkable Friends
2013	"Minstrel Boy", "I'll Be Your Baby Tonight" and "Highway 61 Revisited"; Deluxe Edition includes complete 1969 Isle of Wight performance on Disc 3	Bob Dylan	The Bootleg Series Vol. 10: Another Self Portrait (1969–1971)
2014	The Band plays on all songs.	Bob Dylan	The Bootleg Series Vol. 11: The Basement Tapes Complete

== Singles ==
List of singles, with selected chart positions
Title	Year	Peak chart positions							Album
Title	Year	CAN	CAN AC	CHUM	NL	UK	US	AUS	Album
"Uh-Uh-Uh" "Leave Me Alone" (as the Canadian Squires)	1965	—	—	—	—	—	—	—	Non-album singles
"The Stones I Throw" "He Don't Love You (and He'll Break Your Heart)" (as Levon and the Hawks)	1965	—	—	22	—	—	—	—	Non-album singles
"Go Go Liza Jane" "He Don't Love You (and He'll Break Your Heart") (as Levon and the Hawks)	1968	—	—	—	—	—	—	—	Non-album singles
"The Weight" "I Shall Be Released"	1968	35	—	—	13	21	63	—	Music from Big Pink
"Up on Cripple Creek" "The Night They Drove Old Dixie Down"	1969	10	—	8	—	—	25	—	The Band
"Rag Mama Rag" "The Unfaithful Servant"	1970	46	—	—	—	16	57	27	The Band
"Time to Kill"	1970	45	—	—	13	—	77	100	Stage Fright
"Strawberry Wine" (France)	1971	—	—	—	—	—	—	—	Stage Fright
"The Shape I'm In"	1971	—	—	—	—	—	121	—	Stage Fright
"Life Is a Carnival" "The Moon Struck One"	1971	25	—	—	26	—	72	—	Cahoots
"Don't Do It"	1972	11	—	—	—	—	34	—	Rock of Ages
"(I Don't Want to) Hang up my Rock'n Roll Shoes"	1972	—	—	—	—	—	113	—	Rock of Ages
"Rag Mama Rag"	1973	—	—	—	—	—	—	—	Rock of Ages
"Caledonia Mission"	1973	—	—	—	—	—	—	—	Rock of Ages
"Ain't Got No Home"	1973	35	—	—	—	—	73	97	Moondog Matinee
"The Great Pretender"	1973	—	—	—	—	—	—	—	Moondog Matinee
"Third Man Theme"	1974	—	—	—	—	—	—	—	Moondog Matinee
"On a Night Like This" (with Bob Dylan)	1974	13	—	—	—	—	44	—	Planet Waves
"Something There Is About You" (with Bob Dylan)	1974	—	—	—	—	—	107	—	Planet Waves
"Most Likely You Go Your Way (And I'll Go Mine)" (with Bob Dylan)	1974	43	—	—	—	—	66	—	Before the Flood
"Twilight" (US)/"The Weight" (UK)	1975	—	—	—	—	—	—	—	Non-album single/The Best of The Band
"Ring Your Bell" (UK)	1976	—	—	—	—	—	—	—	Northern Lights – Southern Cross
"Ophelia"	1976	—	—	—	—	—	62	—	Northern Lights – Southern Cross
"Georgia on My Mind"	1976	—	—	—	—	—	—	—	Islands
"Right as Rain"	1977	—	—	—	—	—	—	—	Islands
"Theme from the Last Waltz"	1978	—	—	—	—	—	—	—	The Last Waltz
"Out of the Blue" (US/Canada)	1978	—	—	11	—	—	—	—	The Last Waltz
"Rag Mama Rag" (UK)	1984	—	—	—	—	—	—	—	The Band
"Remedy"^{[Note 1]}	1993	14	27	—	—	—	—	—	Jericho
"Atlantic City"	1993	—	37	—	—	—	—	—	Jericho
"Remedy" (live)/"Blind Willie McTell" (live)	1994	—	—	—	—	—	—	—	
"Stand Up"	1996	—	—	—	—	—	—	—	High On The Hog
"Free Your Mind"	1996	—	—	—	—	—	—	—	High On The Hog
"—" denotes releases that did not chart.

== Notes and references ==
Notes

1. The single "Remedy" also peaked at number 71 on the RPM Country Tracks chart.

General

- "The Band Albums, Discography". Billboard. Prometheus Global Media.
- "The Band > Discography > Main Albums". Allmusic. Rovi Corporation.

Specific
