= Across the Great Divide (album) =

Box set by the Band
- Released: November 15, 1994
- Recorded: January 1963 – January 1986
- Genre: Rock
- Length: 131:57
- Label: Capitol
- Producers: John Simon and the Band

The Band chronology
Jericho (1993)	Across the Great Divide (1994)	Live at Watkins Glen (1995)

Professional ratings
Review scores
Source	Rating
AllMusic	3.5/5 stars
MusicHound	4.5/5 stars

Across the Great Divide is a box set by Canadian-American rock group The Band. Released in 1994, it consists of two discs of songs from the Band's first seven albums, and a third disc of rarities taken from various studio sessions and live performances. The set is now out of print, having been replaced by the five-CD/one-DVD box set A Musical History which was released in September 2005.

== Track listing ==
All songs written by Robbie Robertson, unless otherwise noted.

=== Disc one ===
Tracks 1–7 from Music from Big Pink (1968). Tracks 8–15 from The Band (1969). Tracks 16–19 from Stage Fright (1970).

1. "Tears of Rage" (Bob Dylan, Richard Manuel) – 5:19
2. "The Weight" – 4:35
3. "I Shall Be Released" (Dylan) – 3:12
4. "Chest Fever" – 5:13
5. "In a Station" (Manuel) – 3:30
6. "To Kingdom Come" – 3:19
7. "Lonesome Suzie" (Manuel) – 4:01
8. "Rag Mama Rag" – 3:03
9. "The Night They Drove Old Dixie Down" – 3:31
10. "King Harvest (Has Surely Come)" – 3:38
11. "Rockin' Chair" – 3:39
12. "Whispering Pines" (Manuel, Robertson) – 3:56
13. "Up on Cripple Creek" – 4:31
14. "Across the Great Divide" – 2:54
15. "The Unfaithful Servant" – 4:16
16. "The Shape I'm In" – 4:01
17. "Daniel and the Sacred Harp" – 4:13
18. "All La Glory" – 3:34
19. "Stage Fright" – 3:44

=== Disc two ===
Tracks 1–4 from Cahoots (1971). Tracks 5–9 from Rock of Ages (1972). Tracks 10–11 from Moondog Matinee (1973). Tracks 12–14 from Northern Lights – Southern Cross (1975). Tracks 15–17 from Islands (1977).

1. "When I Paint My Masterpiece" (Dylan) – 4:18
2. "The Moon Struck One" – 4:08
3. "Life Is a Carnival" (Rick Danko, Levon Helm, Robertson) – 3:57
4. "The River Hymn" – 4:37
5. "Don't Do It" (Holland–Dozier–Holland) – 4:42
6. "Caledonia Mission" – 3:21
7. "The W.S. Walcott Medicine Show" – 3:52
8. "Get Up Jake" – 3:16
9. "This Wheel's on Fire" (Danko, Dylan) – 3:54
10. "Share Your Love with Me" (Deadric Malone, Alfred Braggs) – 2:54
11. "Mystery Train" (H. Parker Jr., Sam Phillips, additional lyrics by Robertson) – 5:40
12. "Acadian Driftwood" – 6:40
13. "Ophelia" – 3:29
14. "It Makes No Difference" – 6:32
15. "Livin' in a Dream" – 2:50
16. "The Saga of Pepote Rouge" – 4:13
17. "Right as Rain" – 3:54

=== Disc three ===
1. "Who Do You Love?" (Bo Diddley) – 2:40
  - by Ronnie Hawkins & the Hawks, released March 1963
2. "Do the Honky Tonk" (Don Robey) – 2:58
  - by Levon & the Hawks, recorded live in 1964, previously unreleased
3. "He Don't Love You" – 2:36
  - by Levon & the Hawks, released 1964
4. "Katie's Been Gone" (Manuel, Robertson) – 2:46
  - from The Basement Tapes (1975)
5. "Bessie Smith" (Danko, Robertson) – 4:18
  - from The Basement Tapes
6. "Orange Juice Blues (Blues for Breakfast)" (Manuel) – 3:18
  - Previously unreleased demo
7. "Ain't No Cane on the Brazos" (Traditional, arr. by Danko, Helm, Garth Hudson, Manuel, Robertson) – 4:26
  - Recorded live 1969 at the Woodstock Festival, previously unreleased
8. "Slippin' and Slidin'" (Richard Penniman) – 3:13
  - Recorded live 1970 Syria Mosque Pittsburgh, Pennsylvania, previously unreleased
9. "Twilight" – 3:15
  - from The Best of the Band (1976)
10. "Back to Memphis" (Chuck Berry) – 5:58
11. "Too Wet to Work" (Garth Hudson) – 2:30
  - Performed by Garth Hudson solo, during thundershower
  - Recorded live 1973 at the Summer Jam at Watkins Glen festival in Watkins Glen, New York
12. "Loving You Is Sweeter Than Ever" (Stevie Wonder, Ivy Jo Hunter) – 3:25
13. "Don't Ya Tell Henry" (Dylan) – 3:23
14. "Endless Highway" – 5:09
  - Tracks 10–14 from Live at Watkins Glen (1995)
15. "She Knows" (Jimmy Griffin, Robb Royer) – 3:22
  - Credited to Richard Manuel; Rick Danko and Garth Hudson also perform
  - Recorded live 1986 at the Lone Star Cafe in New York City, New York, previously unreleased
16. "Evangeline" – 3:11 (with Emmylou Harris)
17. "Out of the Blue" – 3:11
18. "The Weight" – 4:35 (with The Staple Singers)
19. "The Last Waltz Refrain" – 1:31
20. "Theme from The Last Waltz (Alternate Mix)" – 3:26
  - Tracks 16–20 from The Last Waltz (1978)

== Personnel ==
- Rick Danko – bass, rhythm guitar, fiddle, trombone, vocals
- Levon Helm – drums, mandolin, rhythm guitar, bass, percussion, vocals
- Garth Hudson – organ, piano, synthesizers, clavinet, accordion, wind instruments
- Richard Manuel – piano, organ, drums, clavinet, harmonica, baritone saxophone, dobro, vocals
- Robbie Robertson – guitars, autoharp, vocals

Producers

- The Band – producers (disc one, tracks 16–19, disc two, tracks 1–17 and disc three tracks 2, 4–5, 8–14)
- John Simon – producer (disc one, tracks 1–15)
- Robbie Robertson – producer (disc three, tracks 16–20)
- Henry Glover – producer (disc three, track 1)
- Eddie Heller – producer (disc three, track 3)
- Albert Grossman – producer (disc three, track 6)
- Eric Blackstead – producer (disc three, track 7)
- Garth Hudson – producer (disc three, track 15)
- See individual albums for engineering credits.

Other participants

- John Simon – electric piano, tuba, baritone horn and tenor saxophone on disc one, tracks 1, 4, 8, 10, 14–15, string arrangements on "Theme from The Last Waltz"
- Allen Toussaint – horn arrangements on "Life Is a Carnival", "Don't Do It", "Caledonia Mission" and "The W.S. Walcott Medicine Show"
- Billy Mundi – drums on "Mystery Train"
- Byron Berline – fiddle on "Acadian Driftwood"
- Ronnie Hawkins – vocals on "Who Do You Love"
- Roy Buchanan – bass on "Who Do You Love"
- Jerry Penfound – tenor saxophone on "Do the Honky Tonk"
- Larry Packer – violin and viola on "She Knows"
- Frank Luther – string bass on "She Knows"
- Jason Myles – harp emulation and programming on "She Knows"
- Emmylou Harris – guitar and vocals on "Evangeline"
- Roebuck "Pops" Staples – guitar and vocals on "The Weight" (disc three)
- Mavis Staples – vocals on "The Weight" (disc three)
- Cleotha and Yvonne Staples – harmony vocals on "The Weight" (disc three)
