= To Kingdom Come: The Definitive Collection =

Greatest hits album by the Band
- Released: September 18, 1989
- Recorded: Early 1968 – early 1977
- Genre: Rock
- Length: 131:57
- Label: Capitol
- Producer: John Simon and the Band

The Band chronology
The Last Waltz (1978)	To Kingdom Come: The Definitive Collection (1989)	The Night They Drove Old Dixie Down: The Best of the Band Live in Concert (1990)

Professional ratings
Review scores
Source	Rating
AllMusic	4.5/5 stars
Hi-Fi News & Record Review	A:1*

To Kingdom Come: The Definitive Collection is an anthology by Canadian-American rock band the Band, released in 1989. The thirty-one tracks were mostly taken from the group's eight albums on Capitol Records. The group's better-known songs, such as "The Weight", "Up on Cripple Creek", "Chest Fever", "The Night They Drove Old Dixie Down", "The Shape I'm In", "Life Is a Carnival" and "It Makes No Difference", are all present. Rarities such as "Loving You Is Sweeter Than Ever", "Get Up Jake" and "Back to Memphis" are also present.

The title track originally appeared on Music from Big Pink and is one of the very few sung by guitarist and principal lyricist Robbie Robertson. It was released on three LPs and two CDs.

To Kingdom Come is now out of print.

== Track listing ==
All tracks are written by Robbie Robertson unless otherwise noted.

Disc one
No.	Title	Writer(s)	Length
1.	"Back to Memphis" (previously unreleased)	Chuck Berry	6:07
2.	"Tears of Rage" (from Music from Big Pink, 1968)	Bob Dylan, Richard Manuel	5:22
3.	"To Kingdom Come" (from Music from Big Pink, 1968)		3:19
4.	"Long Black Veil" (from Music from Big Pink, 1968)	Marijohn Wilkin, Danny Dill	3:04
5.	"Chest Fever" (from Music from Big Pink, 1968)		5:15
6.	"The Weight" (from Music from Big Pink, 1968)		4:38
7.	"I Shall Be Released" (from Music from Big Pink, 1968)	Dylan	3:16
8.	"Up on Cripple Creek" (from The Band, 1969)		4:34
9.	"Loving You Is Sweeter Than Ever" (previously unreleased)	Stevie Wonder, Ivy Joe Hunter	3:34
10.	"Rag Mama Rag" (from The Band, 1969)		3:04
11.	"The Night They Drove Old Dixie Down" (from The Band, 1969)		3:33
12.	"The Unfaithful Servant" (from The Band, 1969)		4:18
13.	"King Harvest (Has Surely Come)" (from The Band, 1969)		3:40
14.	"The Shape I'm In" (from Stage Fright, 1970)		4:04
15.	"The W.S. Walcott Medicine Show" (from Stage Fright, 1970)		3:12
16.	"Daniel and the Sacred Harp" (from Stage Fright, 1970)		4:13
17.	"Stage Fright" (from Stage Fright, 1970)		3:41

Disc two
No.	Title	Writer(s)	Length
1.	"Don't Do It (Baby Don't You Do It)" (live; from Rock of Ages, 1972)	Holland–Dozier–Holland	4:44
2.	"Life Is a Carnival" (from Cahoots, 1971)	Rick Danko, Levon Helm, Robertson	3:59
3.	"When I Paint My Masterpiece" (from Cahoots, 1971)	Dylan	4:22
4.	"4% Pantomime" (from Cahoots, 1971)	Robertson, Van Morrison	4:35
5.	"The River Hymn" (from Cahoots, 1971)		4:42
6.	"Mystery Train" (from Moondog Matinee, 1973)	H. Parker Jr., S. Phillips, additional lyrics by R. Robertson	5:44
7.	"Endless Highway" (live; previously unreleased version)		5:25
8.	"Get Up Jake" (previously unreleased)		2:18
9.	"It Makes No Difference" (from Northern Lights – Southern Cross, 1975)		6:34
10.	"Ophelia" (from Northern Lights – Southern Cross, 1975)		3:33
11.	"Acadian Driftwood" (from Northern Lights – Southern Cross, 1975)		6:41
12.	"Christmas Must Be Tonight" (from Islands, 1977)		3:37
13.	"The Saga of Pepote Rouge" (from Islands, 1977)		4:17
14.	"Knockin' Lost John" (from Islands, 1977)		3:49

== Personnel ==
- The Band – producers (tracks 1, 9, 14–31)
- John Simon – producer (tracks 2–8, 10–13)
- Rick Danko – bass, fiddle, rhythm guitar, vocals
- Levon Helm – drums, mandolin, vocals
- Garth Hudson – organ, piano, accordion, clavinet, wind instruments
- Richard Manuel – piano, organ, clavinet, drums, harmonica, vocals
- Robbie Robertson – guitars, autoharp, vocals
- John Simon – tenor and baritone saxophones, tuba, baritone horn, electric piano
- Van Morrison – vocals
- Allen Toussaint – horn arrangements
- Billy Mundi – drums
- Byron Berline – fiddle
