= A Musical History =

Box set by the Band
- Released: September 27, 2005
- Recorded: September 1961 – May 1977
- Genre: Rock
- Length: 422:49
- Label: Capitol
- Producers: Henry Glover, Jan Haust, Bob Johnson, Cheryl Pawelski, Robbie Robertson, Andrew Sandoval, John Simon, Peter J. Moore

The Band chronology
The Last Waltz (2002)	A Musical History (2005)

Professional ratings
Review scores
Source	Rating
AllMusic	link
Rolling Stone	link

A Musical History is the second box set to anthologize Canadian-American rock group the Band. Released by Capitol Records on September 27, 2005, it features 111 tracks spread over five compact discs and one DVD. Roughly spanning the group's journey from 1961 to 1977, from their days behind Ronnie Hawkins and Bob Dylan through the departure of Robbie Robertson and the first disbanding of the group. The set includes highlights from each of the group's first seven studio albums and both major live recordings and nearly forty rare or previously unreleased performances.

Capitol released a single CD+DVD abridged version titled The Best of A Musical History in 2007. It included a selection of what the compilers felt were the best tracks of the five CDs, as well as a shorter version of the DVD.

== Contents ==
=== Disc one ===
The first disc focuses on the period from 1961 through 1968, giving the first legitimate release on compact disc to four of five single sides the group recorded in 1965, the fifth previously released on 1994's Across the Great Divide. Opening with two tracks featuring an early incarnation of the group featuring Danko, Robertson and Helm (with Manuel on one track) backing Ronnie Hawkins, the disc goes into the first recordings of the group without Hawkins, with Helm assuming lead vocal duties. From there come the earliest tracks featuring the classic line-up, mostly 12-bar blues material, including the group's single sides, the earlier sides recorded as the Canadian Squires, the later sides as Levon and the Hawks. Sessions with Bob Dylan (mostly without Helm) and demo recordings close the disc. These recordings constitute one part of a larger set that will be released as From Bacon Fat to Judgement Day, chronicling the group's journey from 1957 to 1967.

=== Disc two ===
Disc two focuses on 1968, featuring all but one track either in its original or in an alternate or extended version from the group's debut album, as well as several outtakes, a few of which are new to the set. A number with Dylan recorded at a Woody Guthrie tribute concert (where the group performed as "the Crackers") and a few of the group's tracks from The Basement Tapes round out the disc.

=== Disc three ===
The third CD focuses on 1969 to 1971. Eight of twelve tracks from the group's eponymous second album and an early version of a ninth constitute the first part of the disc, with five of ten (with an early version of a sixth) from the third album, a handful of live numbers and a run-through of one track that would appear on the group's fourth album finish the disc.

=== Disc four ===
Disc four focuses on 1971 to 1973, opening with an additional four tracks from the group's fourth album. From there, nine tracks recorded during the shows that made up the group's fifth album, the live Rock of Ages, one of them previously unreleased. The disc closes with three tracks from various sessions in 1972 and 1973, two previously unreleased, and one track from the group's homage to early rock and roll, Moondog Matinee.

=== Disc five ===
The final audio disc focuses on 1973 to 1976, opening with a further three tracks and an outtake from Moondog Matinee. Three further tracks with Dylan follow, two of which were previously released on Planet Waves and Before the Flood. Three of eight tracks from the group's seventh album make up the middle of the disc. The group's last studio sessions, some of which was released on their final album for Capitol, as well as one previously unreleased live track follow. The disc closes with a handful of tracks from the live/studio hybrid The Last Waltz, recorded in 1976 and 1977 and released in 1978.

=== DVD ===
The sixth disc, a DVD, features various performances between 1970 and 1976. Among these are three of four performances the group did on their 1976 appearance on Saturday Night Live, two performances from Wembley Stadium, one performance from the sessions that produced their Rock of Ages album, two from the 1970 Festival Express tour and one from a rarely seen promotional video. All tracks are either previously unreleased in full or in total.

== Track listing ==
All songs are written by Robbie Robertson, except where noted.

=== Disc one ===
1. "Who Do You Love?" (Ellas McDaniel) – 2:40 – Ronnie Hawkins & the Hawks
2. "You Know I Love You" (Jimmy Reed) – 2:44 – Ronnie Hawkins & the Hawks
3. "Further on Up the Road" (Don Robey–Joe Veasey) – 3:06 – The Hawks
4. "Nineteen Years Old" (McKinley Morganfield) – 4:12 – The Hawks
5. "Honky Tonk" (Robey) – 3:02 – Levon & the Hawks
6. "Bacon Fat" (Garth Hudson–Robbie Robertson) – 2:38 – Levon & the Hawks
7. "Robbie's Blues" (The Hawks) – 3:37 – Levon & the Hawks
8. "Leave Me Alone" – 2:37 – Levon & the Hawks (as the Canadian Squires)
9. "Uh-Uh-Uh" – 2:21 – Levon & the Hawks (as the Canadian Squires)
10. "He Don't Love You (And He'll Break Your Heart)" – 2:37 – Levon & the Hawks
11. "(I Want to Be) The Rainmaker" (Sketch track) – 2:59 – Levon & the Hawks
12. "The Stones I Throw" (Sketch track) – 1:07 – Levon & the Hawks
13. "The Stones I Throw (Will Free All Men)" – 2:06 – Levon & the Hawks
14. "Go Go Liza Jane" (Traditional, arr. Robertson) – 2:11 – Levon & the Hawks
15. "Can You Please Crawl Out Your Window?" (Bob Dylan) – 3:32 – Bob Dylan with Levon & the Hawks
16. "Tell Me, Momma" (Live) (Dylan) – 4:05 – Bob Dylan & the Hawks
17. "Just Like Tom Thumb's Blues" (Live) (Dylan) – 5:36 – Bob Dylan & the Hawks
18. "Words and Numbers" (Sketch track) (Richard Manuel) – 4:09
19. "You Don't Come Through" (Sketch track) – 2:03
20. "Beautiful Thing" (Sketch track) (Manuel) – 1:41
21. "Caledonia Mission" (Sketch track) – 2:29
22. "Odds and Ends" (Dylan) – 1:46 – Bob Dylan & the Band
23. "Ferdinand the Impostor" – 4:06
24. "Ruben Remus" (Manuel–Robertson) – 3:13
25. "Will the Circle Be Unbroken" (Traditional, arr. the Band) – 0:55
- Tracks 1–5 and 8–9 produced by Henry Glover; tracks 6–7 produced by Duff Roman; tracks 10, 13 & 14 supervised by Eddie Heller for TRO Productions; track 15 produced by Bob Johnston; tracks 18–25 recorded by Garth Hudson. Production credits for other tracks unknown.

=== Disc two ===
1. "Katie's Been Gone" (Manuel–Robertson) – 2:45
2. "Ain't No More Cane on the Brazos" (Traditional by Christian Rowe, arr. the Band) – 3:58
3. "Don't Ya Tell Henry" (Dylan) – 3:13 – Bob Dylan & the Band
4. "Tears of Rage" (Dylan–Manuel) – 5:21
5. "To Kingdom Come" (Extended version) – 3:57
6. "In a Station" (Manuel) – 3:31
7. "The Weight" – 4:36
8. "We Can Talk" (Manuel) – 3:03
9. "Long Black Veil" (Danny Dill–Marijohn J. Wilkin) – 3:03
10. "Chest Fever" – 5:15
11. "Lonesome Suzie" (Alternate version) (Manuel) – 2:57
12. "This Wheel's on Fire" (Danko–Dylan) – 3:11
13. "I Shall Be Released" (Dylan) – 3:12
14. "Yazoo Street Scandal" – 3:54
15. "I Ain't Got No Home" (Live) (Woody Guthrie) – 3:44 – Bob Dylan & the Band
16. "Orange Juice Blues" (Manuel) – 3:18
17. "Baby Lou" (J. Drew) – 3:38
18. "Long Distance Operator" (Full version) (Dylan) – 4:32
19. "Key to the Highway" (Big Bill Broonzy–Charlie Segar) – 2:22
20. "Bessie Smith" (Rick Danko–Robertson) – 4:17
- All tracks produced by John Simon, except 15, for which production credits are unknown.

=== Disc three ===
1. "Across the Great Divide" – 2:53
2. "Rag Mama Rag" – 3:05
3. "The Night They Drove Old Dixie Down" – 3:33
4. "When You Awake" (Manuel–Robertson) – 3:15
5. "Up on Cripple Creek" – 4:34
6. "Whispering Pines" (Manuel–Robertson) – 3:57
7. "King Harvest (Has Surely Come)" – 3:37
8. "Get Up Jake" – 2:16
9. "Jemima Surrender" (Early version) (L. Helm–Robertson) – 3:47
10. "Daniel and the Sacred Harp" (Alternate take) – 4:21
11. "Time to Kill" – 3:26
12. "All La Glory" (Early version) – 3:24
13. "The Shape I'm In" – 4:02
14. "Stage Fright" – 3:43
15. "The Rumor" – 4:14
16. "Slippin' and Slidin'" (Live) (Eddie Bocage–Al Collins–Richard Penniman–James Smith) – 3:21
17. "Don't Do It" (Eddie Holland–Lamont Dozier–Brian Holland) – 3:46
18. "Strawberry Wine" (Live) (Helm–Robertson) – 3:46
19. "Rockin' Chair" (Live) – 4:12
20. "Look Out Cleveland" (Live) – 3:33
21. "4% Pantomime" (Early version) (Van Morrison–Robertson) – 6:01 – The Band with Van Morrison
- Tracks 1–9 produced by John Simon and tracks 10–15, 17 and 21 produced by the Band. Production credits for other tracks not known.

=== Disc four ===
1. "Life Is a Carnival" (Danko–Helm–Robertson) – 3:55
2. "When I Paint My Masterpiece" (Dylan) – 4:21
3. "The Moon Struck One" – 4:09
4. "The River Hymn" – 4:39
5. "Don't Do It" (Live) (E. Holland–Dozier–B. Holland) – 4:36
6. "Caledonia Mission" (Live) – 3:22
7. "Smoke Signal" (Live) – 5:09
8. "The Unfaithful Servant" (Live) – 4:41
9. "The W.S. Walcott Medicine Show" (Live) – 4:05
10. "The Genetic Method" (Live) (Hudson) – 7:31
11. "Chest Fever" (Live) – 5:04
12. "(I Don't Want to Hang Up My) Rock 'n' Roll Shoes" (Live) (C. Willis) – 4:30
13. "Loving You (Is Sweeter Than Ever)" (Live) (Ivy Jo Hunter–Stevie Wonder) – 3:35
14. "Endless Highway" – 5:07
15. "Move Me" (Sketch track) (Danko) – 2:57
16. "Two Piano Song" – 4:12
17. "Mystery Train" (H. Parker Jr.–S. Phillips, additional lyrics by Robertson) – 5:33
- All tracks produced by the Band

=== Disc five ===
1. "Ain't Got No Home" (C. Henry) – 3:24
2. "Share Your Love" (A. Braggs–D. Malone) – 2:54
3. "Didn't It Rain" (Traditional, arr. the Band) – 3:18
4. "Forever Young" (Dylan) – 4:56 – Bob Dylan & the Band
5. "Rainy Day Women #12 & 35" (Live) (Dylan) – 3:37 – Bob Dylan & the Band
6. "Highway 61 Revisited" (Live) (Dylan) – 3:55 – Bob Dylan
7. "Ophelia" – 3:31
8. "Acadian Driftwood" – 6:41
9. "It Makes No Difference" – 6:32
10. "Twilight" (Sketch track) – 3:25
11. "Christmas Must Be Tonight" – 3:36
12. "The Saga of Pepote Rouge" – 4:13
13. "Livin' in a Dream" – 2:51
14. "Forbidden Fruit" (Live) – 5:39
15. "Home Cookin'" (Danko) – 3:44
16. "Out of the Blue" – 3:20
17. "Evangeline" – 3:10 – The Band with Emmylou Harris
18. "The Night They Drove Old Dixie Down" (Live) – 4:32
19. "The Weight" – 4:36 – The Band with the Staples
- Tracks 1–3, 7–9 and 11–15 produced by the Band, track 4 produced by Bob Dylan, Robbie Robertson and Rob Fraboni, tracks 16–19 produced by Robbie Robertson. Production credits unknown for remaining tracks.

=== Disc six: DVD ===
1. "Jam/King Harvest" (The Band/Robertson) – 4:22 (Early 1970; Robbie's studio, Woodstock, New York)
2. "Long Black Veil" (D. Dill–M. Wilkin) – 2:46 (7/5/70; Festival Express, Calgary, Alberta, Canada)
3. "Rockin' Chair" (Robertson) – 3:52 (7/5/70; Festival Express, Calgary, Alberta, Canada)
4. "Don't Do It" (E. Holland–Dozier–B. Holland) – 4:33 (12/28–31/71; Academy of Music, New York City, New York)
5. "Hard Times (The Slop)/Just Another Whistle Stop" (N. Watts/Manuel–Robertson) – 7:20 (9/14/74; Wembley Stadium, London, England)
6. "Genetic Method/Chest Fever" (Hudson/Robertson) – 7:49 (9/14/74; Wembley Stadium, London, England)
7. "Life Is a Carnival" (Danko–Helm–Robertson) – 3:14 (10/30/76; Saturday Night Live, New York City, New York)
8. "Stage Fright" (Robertson) – 3:32 (10/30/76; Saturday Night Live, New York City, New York)
9. "Georgia on My Mind" (Hoagy Carmichael–Stuart Gorrell) – 3:10 (10/30/76; Saturday Night Live, New York City, New York)
- The Best Of release includes only tracks 1–5 on the DVD
- A performance of "The Night They Drove Old Dixie Down" from the Saturday Night Live appearance is omitted.

==== Audio tracks ====
1. "Working in the Canastas" (Instrumental outtake) (Take 4) (Manuel) (10/24/68; Capitol Studios, New York City, New York, in between sessions for Music from Big Pink and The Band) – Plays as audio in the main menu
2. "The Night They Drove Old Dixie Down" (Tracking session) (3–4/69; Sammy Davis Jr.'s poolhouse, Hollywood, California during sessions for The Band) – Plays as audio in the track selection menu
3. "Katie's Been Gone" (Publishing demo) (Manuel–Robertson, piano arrangement by Hudson) (Probably recorded in between 67–68 in some unknown studio in order to release sheet music transcriptions of piano arrangements of songs written during The Basement Tapes that was at one point or another considered for inclusion on the album) – Plays as audio during the credits menu

=== Download album only ===
1. "The Weight" (2005 remix with overdubs) (Robertson) – 4:37
2. "I Shall Be Released" (Live–Royal Albert Hall) (Dylan) – 4:03

=== Best-of CD ===
n.b. a separate release featuring material from the set was issued as a 'Best of ...'

1. "Who Do You Love?" (Ellas McDaniel) – 2:40 – Ronnie Hawkins & the Hawks
2. "He Don't Love You (And He'll Break Your Heart)" – 2:37 – Levon & the Hawks
3. "Can You Please Crawl Out Your Window?" (Bob Dylan) – 3:32 – Bob Dylan with Levon & the Hawks
4. "Ain't No More Cane on the Brazos" (Traditional by Christian Rowe, arr. the Band) – 3:58
5. "The Weight" – 4:36
6. "Orange Juice Blues" (Manuel) – 3:18
7. "King Harvest (Has Surely Come)" – 3:37
8. "All La Glory" (Early version) – 3:24
9. "Stage Fright" – 3:43
10. "I Shall Be Released" (Dylan) – 3:12
11. "4% Pantomime" (Early version) (Van Morrison–Robertson) – 6:01 – The Band with Van Morrison
12. "Don't Do It" (Live) (E. Holland–Dozier–B. Holland) – 4:36
13. "Life Is a Carnival" (Danko–Helm–Robertson) – 3:55
14. "Slippin' and Slidin'" (Live) (Eddie Bocage–Al Collins–Richard Penniman–James Smith) – 3:21
15. "Endless Highway" – 5:07
16. "Share Your Love" (A. Braggs–D. Malone) – 2:54
17. "Forever Young" (Dylan) – 4:56 – Bob Dylan & the Band
18. "Twilight" (Sketch track) – 3:25
19. "Home Cookin'" (Danko) – 3:44

== Personnel ==
- Rick Danko – bass, guitar, celli, trombone, fiddle, vocals
- Levon Helm – drums, guitar, mandolin, bass, harmonica, percussion, vocals
- Garth Hudson – organ, piano, clavinet, accordion, synthesizers, saxophones, horns
- Richard Manuel – piano, drums, organ, clavinet, pianet, harmonica, percussion, vocals
- Robbie Robertson – guitars, harmonica, piano, vocals

Other participants

- Byron Berline – fiddle (Disc five, track 8)
- Roy Buchanan – guitar, bass (Disc one, tracks 1 & 4)
- Rich Cooper – trumpet, flugelhorn (Disc five, track 18)
- Bob Dylan – vocals, guitars, harmonica (Disc one, tracks 15–17 & 22; disc two, track 15; disc five, tracks 4,5 & 6)
- Joe Farrell – saxophones, English horn (Disc three, tracks 5, 6, 8, 9, 11 & 12)
- Jim Gordon – saxophone, flute, clarinet (Disc five, track 18)
- Emmylou Harris – guitar, vocals (Disc five, track 17)
- Ronnie Hawkins – vocals (Disc one, tracks 1 & 2)
- Jerry Hey – trumpet, flugelhorn (Disc five, track 18)
- Howard Johnson – saxophones, tuba, euphonium, flugelhorn, bass clarinet, horn arrangements (Disc three, tracks 5, 6, 8, 9, 11 & 12; disc five, tracks 14 & 18)
- Mickey Jones – drums (Disc one, tracks 16 & 17)
- Charlie Keagle – saxophones, flute, clarinet (Disc five, track 18)
- Tom Malone – trombone, bass trombone, euphonium, alto flute (Disc five, track 18)
- Earl McIntyre – trombone (Disc three, tracks 5, 6, 8, 9, 11 & 12)
- Van Morrison – vocals (Disc three, track 21)
- Billy Mundi – drums (Disc four, track 17; disc five, track 1)
- Larry Packer – electric violin (Disc five, track 18)
- J. D. Parron – saxophone, E-flat clarinet (Disc three, tracks 5, 6, 8, 9, 11 & 12)
- Jerry Penfound – saxophones, flute (Disc one, tracks 2, 3, 6 & 7)
- John Simon – baritone horn, tuba, "peck horn", piano, percussion (Disc two, tracks 4, 9–11, 18 & 19; disc three, tracks 1, 2 & 7)
- Mavis Staples – vocals (Disc five, track 19)
- Roebuck "Pops" Staples – guitar, vocals (Disc five, track 19)
- Allen Toussaint – horn arrangements (Disc three, tracks 1, 5, 6, 8, 9, 11 & 12; disc five, track 18)
- Snooky Young – trumpet, flugelhorn (Disc three, tracks 5, 6, 8, 9, 11 & 12)
- Cleotha Staples and Yvonne Staples – backing vocals (Disc five, track 19)
- Libby Titus – backing vocals (Disc four, track 4)
- Dionne Warwick, Dee Dee Warwick and Cissy Houston – backing vocals (Disc one, track 2)
- A. N. Other – horns (Disc three, track 1; disc five, track 14)
