= The Night They Drove Old Dixie Down: The Best of the Band Live in Concert =

1990 live album by the Band

Live album by the Band
- Released: 1990
- Genre: Roots rock
- Length: 50:10
- Language: English
- Label: CEMA Special Markets

The Band chronology
To Kingdom Come: The Definitive Collection (1989)	The Night They Drove Old Dixie Down: The Best of the Band Live in Concert (1990)	Jericho (1993)

The Night They Drove Old Dixie Down: The Best of the Band Live in Concert is a 1990 compilation of live recordings from American roots rock group the Band released by CEMA Special Markets.

== Reception ==
The editors of AllMusic Guide gave this album 2.5 out of five stars, with Stephen Thomas Erlewine noting that the performances are good and that listeners will be pleased by the music, but there is too little content and that there are "better ways to hear the Band at their peak".

== Track listing ==
All tracks are taken from Rock of Ages. Various releases of this album have eight or 11 tracks, all of which are written by Robbie Robertson, except where noted:

1. "This Wheel's on Fire" (Rick Danko and Bob Dylan) – 4:07
2. "The Weight" – 5:32
3. "Rag Mama Rag" – 4:33
4. "The Shape I'm In" – 4:14
5. "Don't Do It" (Holland–Dozier–Holland) – 5:00
6. "The Night They Drove Old Dixie Down" – 4:34
7. "Across the Great Divide" – 3:59
8. "Life Is a Carnival" (Danko, Levon Helm, and Robertson) – 4:17
9. "Stage Fright" – 4:38
10. "The Unfaithful Servant" – 4:48
11. "King Harvest (Has Surely Come)" – 4:04

== Personnel ==
The Band at the Academy of Music concerts
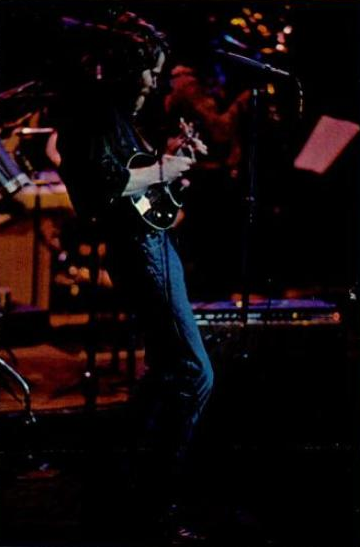
Levon Helm

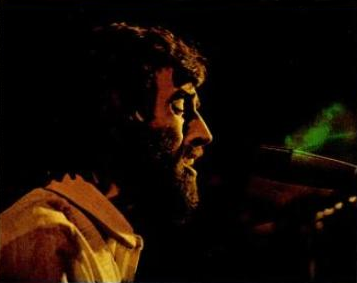
Richard Manuel

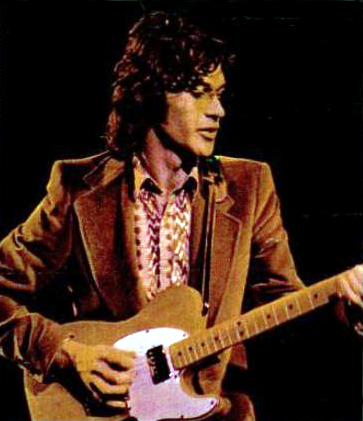
Robbie Robertson

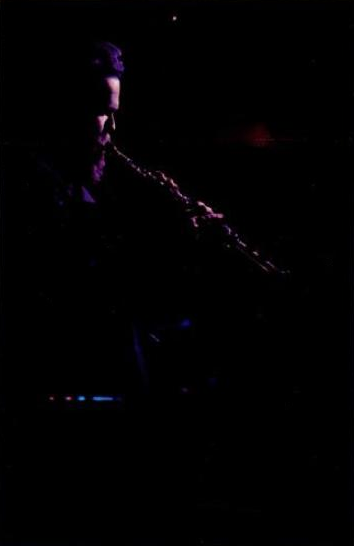
Garth Hudson

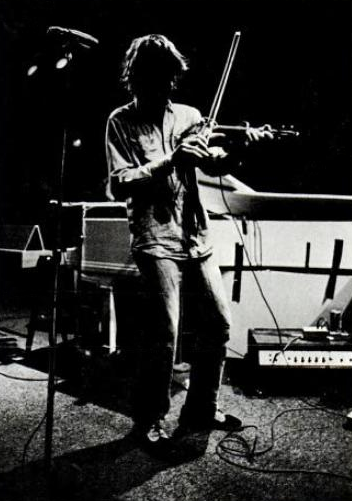
Rick Danko

The Band

- Robbie Robertson – guitar, backing vocals, introduction
- Garth Hudson – organ, piano, accordion, tenor and soprano saxophone solos
- Richard Manuel – vocals, piano, organ, clavinet, drums
- Rick Danko – vocals, bass guitar, violin
- Levon Helm – vocals, drums, mandolin

Additional musicians

- Howard Johnson – tuba, euphonium, baritone saxophone
- Snooky Young – trumpet, flugelhorn
- Joe Farrell – tenor and soprano saxophones, English horn
- Earl McIntyre – trombone
- J. D. Parran – alto saxophone and E-flat clarinet
- Bob Dylan – vocals, guitar on "Down in the Flood", "When I Paint My Masterpiece", "Don't Ya Tell Henry", and "Like a Rolling Stone"

Production

- Allen Toussaint – horn arrangements
- Phil Ramone – engineer
- Mark Harman – engineer
