= The Unfaithful Servant =

Song by The Band

from the album The Band
- Released: September 22, 1969
- Recorded: 1969
- Length: 4:17
- Label: Capitol
- Songwriter(s): Robbie Robertson
- Producer(s): John Simon

"The Unfaithful Servant" or "Unfaithful Servant" is a song written by Robbie Robertson that was first released by The Band on their 1969 album The Band. It was also released as the B-side of the group's "Rag Mama Rag" single. It has also appeared on several of the Band's live and compilation albums.

== Lyrics and music ==
The lyrics of "The Unfaithful Servant" concern a servant who offended the mistress of the house and is being sent away. The singer offers sympathy to the servant. The identity of the singer is ambiguous. According to Jason Schneider, the singer is a "conscientious friend coming to the aid" of the former servant but according to Nick DeRiso it could be a "master bidding goodbye to his hand maiden after an embarrassing affair is revealed." As with other songs on The Band, the characters seems to be from the Southern United States. Music critic Barney Hoskyns described the setting as a Southern household from a Tennessee Williams play. David Hatch and Stephen Millward describe the prevailing emotion as being one of "regret rather than incrimination." Robertson stated in 1971 that "To write a song about this kind of thing is not really a very righteous thing to do, because we're at the point now where there should be no differences between people. Everybody is now so interested in being the same, so I was kinda playing a game in writing this song."

According to The Band FAQ author Peter Aaron, the song uses an "odd, descending chord progression" that is more like jazz than the Band's other music. Hoskyns similarly acknowledges that the song is unlike most rock 'n' roll. Jazz critic Ralph J. Gleason stated that the song sounds like could have been written by jazz pianist Bill Evans. Aaron also states that the song may have been influenced by England's ballad tradition.

Bassist Rick Danko sings the lead vocal, which Hoskyns praises for its "mixture of bashfulness and regret." DeRiso says it is "as observant, and maybe more interesting" than Danko's vocal performance on "It Makes No Difference," which is often regarded as Danko's best. The instrumentation starts with Robertson on acoustic guitar, Levon Helm on drums and Richard Manuel on piano. DeRiso argues that Manuel's piano and Robertson's guitar work in opposition to each other, with Manuel's piano part sounding "ruminative" and Robertson's guitar sounding like it is "determined" with a sense of duty, and that this opposition adds to the complexity of the song. During the second verse, Garth Hudson adds his soprano saxophone and producer John Simon kicks in on tuba, and DeRiso describes their effect as enriching the song's emotion "by a series of mournful moans." The song is unusual for the Band in that it contains two instrumental solos, a guitar solo by Robertson and a saxophone solo by Hudson, both of which Aaron describes as "tender."

== Writing and recording ==
Robertson wrote "The Unfaithful Servant" in Hawaii on a trip he took with Simon shortly before The Band was to be recorded.

The released version of the song uses the vocal Danko recorded on the first take. He recalls recording the vocal 30 or 40 more times before they decided to just use the first. According to producer Simon, the "moaning" horn sound that elicited favorable commentary was not done intentionally but rather came about because those were the only sounds he and Hudson were able to make.

== Reception ==
Aaron rates "The Unfaithful Servant" as one of the Band's greatest songs. Band biographer Cliff Harris claims that "in the space of four minutes and seventeen seconds" the song "presented a story worthy of Faulkner or Hemingway. DeRiso calls it "a wonder of heart-rending honesty." C. Michael Bailey wrote in the April 2012 issue of All about Jazz that "The Unfaithful Servant" and "The Weight" represented the Biblical American archetype "perhaps better than any other place in popular music." Nicholas Oliver wrote in The Rough Guide to Rock that the "compelling narratives" of "The Unfaithful Servant" as well as "The Night They Drove Old Dixie Down" and "King Harvest (Has Surely Come)," represent Robertson's "creative peak." In his autobiography, Elvis Costello identified "The Unfaithful Servant" as his favorite song.

George Harrison biographer Simon Leng identifies the Band's first two albums as significant influences on Harrison's solo song writing, and particularly identifies "The Unfaithful Servant" as an influence. Leng identifies a number of elements that showed up in many of Harrison's solo efforts, including "the medium tempo, the tension of the second theme...the eccentric chord structure" as well as passionate singing that seems to be barely within the singer's range, and the "sweet and sour horn arrangement." Leng also notes that the guitar playing style and "reverent" mood of the song were similar to Harrison's subsequent songs.

"The Unfaithful Servant" has been included on several of The Band's compilation albums. These have included To Kingdom Come: The Definitive Collection in 1989, Across the Great Divide in 1994 and A Musical History in 2005.

== Personnel ==
- Rick Danko – lead vocal, bass guitar, trombone
- Levon Helm – backing vocal, drums
- Richard Manuel – piano
- Robbie Robertson – acoustic guitar
- Garth Hudson – soprano saxophone
- John Simon – tuba

== Live versions ==
"The Unfaithful Servant" was frequently played in the Band's live shows and appeared on the group's live album Rock of Ages. Hoskyns says this is because it "was not only a perfect showcase for Rick [Danko] as a ballad singer but featured a spine-tingling Robertson solo utilizing his remarkable 'trilling' technique and harmonics." The song was recorded live during the performances at the Academy of Music in New York City in late 1971, a selection of which were released on the live album Rock of Ages. Allen Toussaint charted additional horn parts for these performances through which Snooky Young, Howard Johnson and Joe Farrell joined Earl McIntyre on trombone and J.D. Parron on alto saxophone. Hoskyns particularly praised Farrell's soprano saxophone fills. Although some of these musicians had played with the likes of Count Basie, Jimmie Lunceford, Ray Charles, Elvin Jones and Charles Mingus, Garth Hudson still played his saxophone solo himself. Robertson's guitar playing also attracted attention. For the live performances Robertson plays electric guitar rather than the acoustic guitar he played on The Band version. DeRiso says that as a result Robertson's guitar "even more completely inhabits the steely sense of duty that drives the narrator. In Hoskyns' opinion the guitar solo on Rock of Ages could be one of the ten greatest ever recorded. DeRiso also praises Danko's vocal performance for capturing how unbearable it is to the narrator that his beloved servant is leaving. Gleason similarly concludes that this is "an unusually warm, moving version of this exquisite song and is the best vocal Rick contributes, possibly the best he's done."

Other live albums containing "The Unfaithful Servant" include Live at the Academy of Music 1971 from the shows on which Rock of Ages was based, released in 2013, and The Night They Drove Old Dixie Town: Radio Broadcast 1970, released in 2016.
