= The W.S. Walcott Medicine Show =

Song by The Band

from the album Stage Fright
- Released: August 17, 1970
- Genre: Roots rock
- Length: 2:58
- Label: Capitol
- Songwriter(s): Robbie Robertson
- Producer(s): The Band

"The W.S. Walcott Medicine Show" is a song written by Robbie Robertson that was first released on the Band's 1970 album Stage Fright. It was also frequently performed in the group's live sets and appeared on several of their live albums. Based on Levon Helm's memories of minstrel and medicine shows in Arkansas, the song has been interpreted as an allegory on the music business. Garth Hudson received particular praise for his tenor saxophone playing on the song.

== Lyrics and music ==
The song is based on stories Band drummer Levon Helm told Robertson about minstrel and medicine shows he remembered from his youth in Arkansas. The song's title is based on the name of one such traveling show, F. S. Wolcott's Original Rabbit's Foot Minstrels. The song lyrics describe the colorful characters in the show. Rolling Stone critic John Burks particularly praises the line describing the show's proprietor W.S. Walcott "Y'know he always holds it in a tent/'N if you're lookin' for the real thing he can show you where it went." Burks also praises the line "I'd rather die happy than not die at all/For a man is a fool who will not heed the call."

Music critic Barney Hoskyns criticized the lyrics for being "almost too contrived as tintype portraiture" and for asking the listener to be enchanted with the characters without the song creating a "compelling vignette from the material." Jason Schneider similarly describes the song as "overwrought." But other critics have found a deeper meaning to the lyrics. Allmusic critic William Ruhlmann states that the song comments "on the falseness of show business." The Band FAQ author Peter Aaron describes the song as "an allegory for the music business." Nick DeRiso sees the "escapades" and "ruses" described in the song as creating "an allegory on the dangers of the lifestyle that had rapidly ensnared the Band" during their meteoric rise to stardom with the two albums they released before Stage Fright. To DeRiso, the "snake oil" of the medicine show represents the "late-night escapades and mid-day binges — the mysterious, soul-deadening, very real temptations of the rock-star lifestyle" DeRiso believes that the message was primarily directed at Band pianist Richard Manuel, whose life was falling apart and who was also believed to be the intended recipient of the message of "The Shape I'm In," the song immediately preceding "The W.S. Walcott Medicine Show" on the Stage Fright album. C. Michael Bailey had a different take on the song in the April 2012 issue of All about Jazz, stating that the song represented the American archetype of "celebration and good times."

Helm takes the lead vocal on "The W.S. Walcott Medicine Show" with bassist Rick Danko singing some passages. Hoskyns finds the song to be "as tailor made for [Helm] as "The Night They Drove Old Dixie Down," stating that this song comes closer than any on Stage Fright to the mood of the Band's previous album The Band. DeRiso states that Helms' "age-old timbre" and Danko's "down-home charm" transport the listener back to the time of Helm's youth.

Hudson plays both tenor saxophone and baritone saxophone, with a solo on tenor sax. Robertson plays electric guitar and producer John Simon plays trombone. Hoskyns praises Hudson's and Simon's horns as the "nicest touch" on the song. He particularly praises Hudson's tenor sax solo as being worthy of New Orleans' great Lee Allen. Burks finds the beginning of Hudson's solo to be mysterious and enigmatic, reminding him of the Emotions, while he finds the ending grittier and showing old-fashioned roots, reminding him of Ben Webster. Burks' only criticism of the song is that he feels they should have had Hudson playing much more tenor sax.

== Reception ==
Q magazine critic John Bauldie called "The W.S. Walcott Medicine Show "The Band's greatest Americana song." Musichound author Leland Rucker referred to "The W.S. Walcott Medicine Show" as one of the Band's classics. David K. Blake described it as "a delightfully funky take on vaudeville." The song has been included on several of the Band's compilation albums, including To Kingdom Come: The Definitive Collection in 1989 and Across the Great Divide in 1994. A live version was included on A Musical History in 2005.

The Hans Staymer Band covered the song in 1972. Billboard Magazine described their version as a "grabber."

== Performers ==
- Levon Helm – 1st lead vocal, drums
- Rick Danko – 2nd lead vocal, backing vocals, bass guitar
- Richard Manuel – piano
- Robbie Robertson – electric guitar
- Garth Hudson – tenor saxophone (including solo), baritone saxophone

with:

- John Simon – trombone

== Live versions ==
The Band frequently played "The W.S. Walcott Medicine Show" in their live sets. For their shows at the Academy of Music in New York City recorded for the live album Rock of Ages the group was augmented by a number of horn legends for this song, with Allen Toussaint charting the additional horn parts. Additional players included Snooky Young on trumpet, Howard Johnson, Joe Farrell on tenor saxophone, Earl McIntyre on trombone and J.D. Parron on alto saxophone. Although some of these musicians had played with the likes of Count Basie, Jimmie Lunceford, Ray Charles, Elvin Jones and Charles Mingus, Hudson played his own solo. Rolling Stone critic Ralph J. Gleason called Hudson's solo on this performance "outstanding." According to Robertson, the other "horn players were cheering him on ... blowing with one fist in the air," which Gleason called a "deserved tribute." Aaron states that this live version does the song "full justice." Hoskyns said that it "swung like big-band jazz." Peter J. Barsocchini of the San Mateo County Times described it as a "stand out" of side 1 of the album.

The Band performed the song at the Summer Jam at Watkins Glen at Watkins Glen Grand Prix Raceway on July 28, 1973, although the performance was not included on the concert's "official" CD release. The song was part of their encore on September 18, 1976 for the opening of the newly renamed Palladium (formerly the Academy of Music) in New York City. The group was accompanied by additional horn players, including Johnson, and used Toussaint's horn arrangements. Paul Butterfield accompanied the group on harmonica for this performance. The song was also included in The Band's final concert at Winterland Ballroom on November 25, 1976, the basis of the film The Last Waltz. Although the performance was omitted from the released film and from the original album released in 1978, it was included on 2002 album re-release.
