= Across the Great Divide (song) =

Song by The Band

from the album The Band
- Released: September 22, 1969
- Genre: Roots rock
- Length: 2:53
- Label: Capitol
- Songwriter: Robbie Robertson
- Producer: John Simon

"Across the Great Divide" is a song written by Robbie Robertson. It was first released by The Band on their 1969 album The Band and was subsequently released on several live and compilation albums. According to music critic Barney Hoskyns, it was one of several songs that contributed to The Band being something of a concept album about the American South.

== Lyrics and music ==
The lyrics begin with the singer asking his wife Molly to put down the gun she is waving at him. The singer then recalls his earlier struggles when all he wanted was a home, and thinks that if Molly does not put the gun down he will have to leave that home. According to Rolling Stone Magazine critic Greil Marcus, the fight ends when the song ends, although the singer still wants to know where Molly hid the gun. According to Hoskyns, the song then achieves "a blithely good-humoured groove, with the unrepentant heel bragging tipsily over some Fats Domino-style piano triplets." Similarly, Allmusic critic Thomas Ward describes the song as the singer asking Molly to put her gun down and "try to understand [her] man," and then portraying "an uplifting dream" to create a better life and achieve the American dream after traveling "across the great divide." Music critic Nick DeRiso comments on the "witty irony" of the situation. Band biographer Craig Harris agrees that it is an "optimistic" song, stating that it portrays "celebration and good times."

Hoskyns states that the song appears to be set in a "one-horse town" common to Western movies, but that the "harvest moon" and riverside described in the lyrics place the song within the American South, like other songs from the album such as "The Night They Drove Old Dixie Down" and "King Harvest (Has Surely Come)." The link with "The Night They Drove Old Dixie Down" was emphasized in many concerts in which "Across the Great Divide" was often played immediately following "The Night They Drove Old Dixie Down." Hoskyns also sees a link with "Up on Cripple Creek," since "Cripple Creek" is also a "good ol' boy classic" narrated by a "devil-may-care drunkard." The reference to a harvest moon provides a more direct link to the theme of harvest which runs through The Band and especially "King Harvest (Has Surely Come)," which is the last song on The Band and so helps bring thematic unity to the album. To Harris, this link helps define the journey undertaken in The Band, from the "idealism" of "Across the Great Divide" to "stark reality" of "King Harvest." Ward describes the song as sounding "old as the hills," and representing what The Band does best, creating a "rustic, down-home narrative coupled by organic, acoustic instrumentation." Band organist Garth Hudson plays saxophone in addition to organ on the song.

Marcus notes another aspect to the appropriateness of "Across the Great Divide" as the opening song of an album that uses America as a theme. He notes the symbolism of the Great Divide being the place where the two sides separate, but also meet. According to Marcus, "Across the Great Divide" and the other songs on the album are meant to "cross the great divide between men and women, between the past and the present, between the country and the city, between the North and the South." In turn, The New York Times critic Frank Rich comments on Marcus' analysis of the symbolism of "Across the Great Divide" and other songs by stating that Marcus "attempts to place such songs as Randy Newman's "Sail Away," The Band's "Across the Great Divide" and Elvis Presley's early efforts for Sam Phillips at Sun Records into the same broad cultural context.

== Reception ==
Ward described "Across the Great Divide" "a magnificent opening" to The Band, particularly praising the melody and the lead vocal by Richard Manuel. According to The New Rolling Stone Album Guide critic Mark Kemp, "Across the Great Divide" is a "sweeping" opening to the album. Pittsburgh Post-Gazette critic Tim Ziaukus also commented on the song's "epic sweep." The Village Voice critic Robert Christgau contrasted "Across the Great Divide" with "Tears of Rage," the opening song of The Band's previous album Music from Big Pink by stating that "Across the Great Divide" is "as a storefront church on 127th Street is to Riverside Baptist."

A live version of "Across the Great Divide" was included on the 1972 live album Rock of Ages. It was also included on the box sets Across the Great Divide and A Musical History and on some versions of the compilation album The Best of The Band.
