= The Last Waltz (soundtrack) =

1978 soundtrack album by the Band

Soundtrack album / live album by the Band
- Released: April 7, 1978
- Recorded: November 25, 1976 (Concert), and 1977 (Last Waltz Suite)
- Venues: Winterland Arena, San Francisco
- Genre: Rock
- Length: 129:06
- Label: Warner Bros.
- Producer: Robbie Robertson

The Band chronology
Anthology (1978)	The Last Waltz (1978)	To Kingdom Come (1989)

Singles from The Last Waltz
- 1. "Theme from The Last Waltz" Released: June 1978; 2. "Out of the Blue" Released: November 1978

Professional ratings
Review scores
Source	Rating
AllMusic	4/5 stars
Christgau's Record Guide	B+
Rolling Stone	(not rated)
The Rolling Stone Album Guide	4/5 stars
Uncut	8/10

The Last Waltz is the second live album by the Band, released on Warner Bros. Records in 1978, catalogue 3WS 3146. It is the soundtrack to the 1978 film of the same name, and the final album by the original configuration of the Band. It peaked at No. 16 on the Billboard 200.

== Contents ==
The triple album documents the Band's "farewell" concert which took place at Bill Graham's Winterland Ballroom on Thanksgiving Day 1976. The event included an actual Thanksgiving dinner for 5,000 attendees, with ballroom dancing and a stage set for La traviata borrowed from the San Francisco Opera.

The concert featured songs by the Band interspersed with the group backing up a variety of musical guests. These included many with whom they had worked in the past, notably their previous employers Ronnie Hawkins and Bob Dylan. Van Morrison, a Woodstock neighbor, had co-written and sung on the track "4% Pantomime" for the Cahoots album. Individual members of the Band had played with the invitees on the following albums: in 1972 with Bobby Charles for his self-titled album; in 1973 with Ringo Starr on Ringo; in 1974 with Joni Mitchell on Court and Spark and with Neil Young on On the Beach and the sessions for Homegrown, later assembled into an album and released in 2020; in 1975 with Muddy Waters and Paul Butterfield on The Muddy Waters Woodstock Album; in 1976 with Eric Clapton on No Reason to Cry and with Neil Diamond on Beautiful Noise.

Sides one through five of the album consisted of songs taken from the concert. Side six comprised "The Last Waltz Suite", new numbers composed by Robertson and performed by the Band on an MGM soundstage. The suite featured Emmylou Harris and, on a remake of "The Weight", Roebuck and Mavis Staples. The music received overdubs at Village Recorders and Shangri-La studios in post-production, owing to faults recorded during the concert.

On April 16, 2002, a box set reissue of the album arrived in stores, including everything released on the original with additional tracks taken from the concert and rehearsals.

== Track listing ==
The performance of "Helpless" by Neil Young features backing vocals by Joni Mitchell; Paul Butterfield plays harmonica for Muddy Waters on "Mannish Boy"; Dr. John plays congas on "Coyote" and plays guitar on "Down South in New Orleans"; the entire ensemble sings back-up on the closer, "I Shall Be Released".

Side one
No.	Title	Writer(s)	Singer/guest performer	Length
1.	"Theme from The Last Waltz"	Robbie Robertson	instrumental	3:28
2.	"Up on Cripple Creek"	Robertson	Levon Helm	4:44
3.	"Who Do You Love?"	Ellas McDaniel	Ronnie Hawkins	4:16
4.	"Helpless"	Young	Neil Young	5:47
5.	"Stage Fright"	Robertson	Rick Danko	4:25
Total length:				22:40

Side two
No.	Title	Writer(s)	Singer/guest performer	Length
1.	"Coyote"	Mitchell	Joni Mitchell	5:50
2.	"Dry Your Eyes"	Diamond, Robertson	Neil Diamond	3:57
3.	"It Makes No Difference"	Robertson	Danko	6:48
4.	"Such a Night"	Mac Rebennack	Dr. John	4:00
Total length:				20:35

Side three
No.	Title	Writer(s)	Singer/guest performer	Length
1.	"The Night They Drove Old Dixie Down"	Robertson	Helm	4:34
2.	"Mystery Train"	Junior Parker, Sam Phillips	Paul Butterfield, Helm	4:59
3.	"Mannish Boy"	Mel London, McDaniel, McKinley Morganfield	Muddy Waters	6:54
4.	"Further on Up the Road"	Robey, Veasey	Eric Clapton	5:08
Total length:				21:35

Side four
No.	Title	Writer(s)	Singer/guest performer	Length
1.	"The Shape I'm In"	Robertson	Richard Manuel	4:06
2.	"Down South in New Orleans"	J. Wright, J. Anglin	Bobby Charles, Dr. John	3:06
3.	"Ophelia"	Robertson	Helm	3:53
4.	"Tura Lura Lural (That's an Irish Lullaby)"	Shannon	Van Morrison, Manuel	4:15
5.	"Caravan"	Morrison	Morrison	6:02
Total length:				21:22

Side five
No.	Title	Writer(s)	Singer/guest performer	Length
1.	"Life Is a Carnival"	Danko, Helm, Robertson	Helm, Danko	4:32
2.	"Baby, Let Me Follow You Down"	Reverend Gary Davis, Rick von Schmidt	Bob Dylan	3:00
3.	"I Don't Believe You"	Dylan	Dylan	3:23
4.	"Forever Young"	Dylan	Dylan	4:42
5.	"Baby, Let Me Follow You Down (Reprise)"	Davis, von Schmidt	Dylan	2:46
6.	"I Shall Be Released"	Dylan	Dylan, Manuel	6:22
Total length:				24:45

Side six – "The Last Waltz suite"
No.	Title	Writer(s)	Singer/guest performer	Length
1.	"The Well"	Robertson	Manuel	3:27
2.	"Evangeline"	Robertson	Danko, Emmylou Harris, Helm	3:17
3.	"Out of the Blue"	Robertson	Robertson	3:03
4.	"The Weight"	Robertson	Helm, Mavis Staples, Pops Staples, Danko	4:38
5.	"The Last Waltz Refrain"	Robertson	Manuel, Robertson	1:28
6.	"Theme from The Last Waltz"	Robertson	instrumental	3:22
Total length:				19:25 130:22

== Personnel ==
The Band

- Rick Danko – bass guitar, fiddle, vocals
- Levon Helm – drums, mandolin, vocals
- Garth Hudson – organ, piano, accordion, synthesizer, clavinet, saxophones
- Richard Manuel – piano, drums, organ, clavinet, Dobro, vocals
- Robbie Robertson – guitars, piano, vocals

=== The horn section ===
- Rich Cooper – trumpet, flugelhorn
- James Gordon – flute, tenor saxophone, clarinet
- Jerry Hey – trumpet, flugelhorn
- Howard Johnson – tuba, baritone saxophone, flugelhorn, bass clarinet
- Charlie Keagle – clarinet; flute; alto, tenor and soprano saxophones
- Tom Malone – trombone, euphonium, alto flute, bass trombone
- Larry Packer – electric violin
- Horns arranged by Henry Glover, Garth Hudson, Howard Johnson, Tom Malone, John Simon and Allen Toussaint

=== Guest personnel ===
- Paul Butterfield – harmonica, vocal
- Bobby Charles – vocal
- Eric Clapton – guitar, vocal
- Neil Diamond – guitar, vocal
- Dr. John – piano, guitar, congas, vocal
- Bob Dylan – guitar, vocal
- Emmylou Harris – guitar, vocal
- Ronnie Hawkins – vocal
- Bob Margolin – guitar on "Mannish Boy"
- Joni Mitchell – guitar, vocal
- Van Morrison – vocal
- Pinetop Perkins – piano on "Mannish Boy"
- Dennis St. John – drums on "Dry Your Eyes"
- John Simon – piano on "Too Ra Loo Ra Loo Ral"
- Cleotha Staples – harmony vocal on "The Weight"
- Mavis Staples – vocal
- Roebuck "Pops" Staples – guitar, vocal
- Yvonne Staples – harmony vocal on "The Weight"
- Ringo Starr – drums on "I Shall Be Released"
- Muddy Waters – vocals
- Ronnie Wood – guitar on "I Shall Be Released"
- Neil Young – guitar, harmonica, vocal

=== Production personnel ===
- Robbie Robertson – producer
- John Simon – producer, string arrangements
- Rob Fraboni – producer
- Ed Anderson – recording and mixing engineer
- Terry Becker, Neil Brody, Tim Kramer, Elliot Mazer and Wayne Neuendorf – recording engineers
- Baker Bigsby, Tony Bustos and Jeremy Zatkin – mixing engineers
- Bill Graham – concert production

== Charts ==
=== Weekly charts ===
Chart (1978–2023)	Peak position
Australia Albums (Kent Music Report)	11
Austrian Albums (Ö3 Austria)	23
Belgian Albums (Ultratop Flanders)	115
Dutch Albums (Album Top 100)	13
French Albums (SNEP)	158
German Albums (Offizielle Top 100)	13
Hungarian Physical Albums (MAHASZ)	19
New Zealand Albums (RMNZ)	8
Norwegian Albums (VG-lista)	15
Swedish Albums (Sverigetopplistan)	24
US Billboard 200	16

=== Year-end charts ===
Chart (1978)	Position
Dutch Albums (Album Top 100)	19
New Zealand Albums (RMNZ)	27

== 2002 box set ==
The Last Waltz

Soundtrack album & box set by the Band
- Released: April 16, 2002
- Recorded: November 25, 1976 (Winterland Arena, San Francisco); Late 1976 – mid-1977 (Studio overdubs)
- Genre: Rock
- Length: 246:18
- Label: Warner Bros./Rhino
- Producer: Robbie Robertson

The Band chronology
Greatest Hits (2000)	The Last Waltz (2002)	A Musical History (2005)

Professional ratings
Review scores
Source	Rating
AllMusic	4/5 stars

The Last Waltz is a 2002 four-disc box set re-release of the 1978 album The Last Waltz documenting the concert The Last Waltz, the last concert by the Band with its classic line up. A full forty tracks are taken from the show in addition to rehearsal outtakes. Twenty-four tracks are previously unreleased.

Among the tracks added are a version of Louis Jordan's "Caldonia" featuring Muddy Waters and Pinetop Perkins trading off the vocal, a reworked version of "Rag Mama Rag", Neil Young and Joni Mitchell joining the Band on "Acadian Driftwood", "The W.S. Walcott Medicine Show", excerpts from a pair of instrumental jams involving several of the concert's guest performers, and the concert closer "Don't Do It". In addition, several edits made on the original 1978 set have been done away with; certain songs (such as "Forever Young" with Bob Dylan) are now presented in their unedited versions.

Songs still missing from the concert are a version of "Georgia on My Mind", the full versions of the two jams presented, the full version of "Chest Fever", and the concert takes of "King Harvest (Has Surely Come)" and "Evangeline". While the album still has overdubbing, re-sequencing, and editing, it does give a more accurate representation of the event itself than the earlier album or film do, according to collectors who have made comparisons with bootleg recordings of the concert.

On November 11, 2016, this set was reissued as part of a 40th Anniversary edition that includes the 1978 Scorsese film on a separate Blu-ray disc. Enclosed in a 10" by 11.5" booklet, the set contains numerous photographs from the event as well as essays by David Fricke and Ben Fong-Torres. A previously published article entitled "A Behind-the-Scenes Report" by Emmett Grogan is also included, as well as a reproduction of the article on the event by Joel Selvin printed in the San Francisco Chronicle on November 27, 1976. It is not indicated whether or not new mastering was done to the audio discs over and above that from the 2002 reissue.

=== Box set track listing ===
All songs were written by Robbie Robertson, except where noted.

Disc one
No.	Title	Writer(s)	Guest performer(s)	Length
1.	"Theme from The Last Waltz (Note: Features additional material)"		The Orchestra	3:52
2.	"Up on Cripple Creek"			5:31
3.	"The Shape I'm In"			4:10
4.	"It Makes No Difference"			6:51
5.	"Who Do You Love?"	Ellas McDaniel	Ronnie Hawkins	4:51
6.	"Life Is a Carnival"	Rick Danko, Levon Helm, Robbie Robertson		4:25
7.	"Such a Night"	Mac Rebennack	Dr. John	4:41
8.	"The Weight (Note: Previously unreleased)"			4:50
9.	"Down South in New Orleans"	Jack Anglin, Jim Anglin, Johnnie Wright	Bobby Charles, Dr. John	3:11
10.	"This Wheel's on Fire"	Rick Danko, Bob Dylan		3:54
11.	"Mystery Train"	Junior Parker, Sam Phillips	Paul Butterfield	5:03
12.	"Caldonia"	Louis Jordan	Muddy Waters, Pinetop Perkins, Bob Margolin	6:08
13.	"Mannish Boy"	Mel London, Ellas McDaniel, McKinley Morganfield	Muddy Waters	6:40
14.	"Stage Fright"			4:31

Disc two
No.	Title	Writer(s)	Guest performer(s)	Length
1.	"Rag Mama Rag"			4:34
2.	"All Our Past Times"	Eric Clapton, Rick Danko	Eric Clapton	5:01
3.	"Further on Up the Road"	Don Robey, Joe Medwick	Eric Clapton	5:30
4.	"Ophelia"			3:45
5.	"Helpless" (Mitchell uncredited on track listing)	Neil Young	Neil Young, Joni Mitchell	5:53
6.	"Four Strong Winds"	Ian Tyson	Neil Young	4:37
7.	"Coyote"	Joni Mitchell	Joni Mitchell	5:28
8.	"Shadows and Light"	Joni Mitchell	Joni Mitchell	5:45
9.	"Furry Sings the Blues"	Joni Mitchell	Joni Mitchell, Neil Young	5:09
10.	"Acadian Driftwood" (Mitchell and Young uncredited on track listing)		Joni Mitchell, Neil Young	7:07
11.	"Dry Your Eyes"	Neil Diamond, Robbie Robertson	Neil Diamond	4:16
12.	"The W.S. Walcott Medicine Show"			3:39
13.	"Tura Lura Lural (That's an Irish Lullaby)"	James Royce Shannon	Van Morrison	4:10
14.	"Caravan"	Van Morrison	Van Morrison	6:12

Disc three
No.	Title	Writer(s)	Guest performer(s)	Length
1.	"The Night They Drove Old Dixie Down"			4:35
2.	"The Genetic Method/Chest Fever" (incomplete)	Garth Hudson/Robbie Robertson		2:41
3.	"Baby, Let Me Follow You Down"	Reverend Gary Davis	Bob Dylan	2:55
4.	"Hazel"	Bob Dylan	Bob Dylan	3:41
5.	"I Don't Believe You (She Acts Like We Never Have Met)"	Bob Dylan	Bob Dylan	3:29
6.	"Forever Young"	Bob Dylan	Bob Dylan	5:51
7.	"Baby, Let Me Follow You Down (reprise)"	Gary Davis	Bob Dylan	2:58
8.	"I Shall Be Released" (finale)	Bob Dylan	Bob Dylan, Paul Butterfield, Eric Clapton; Neil Diamond, Dr. John, Ronnie Hawkins, Joni Mitchell, Van Morrison, Ringo Starr, Ronnie Wood, Pinetop Perkins	4:49
9.	"Jam #1" (Danko, Helm, Hudson and Robertson from the Band)		Neil Young, Ronnie Wood, Eric Clapton, Dr. John, Paul Butterfield, Ringo Starr	5:32
10.	"Jam #2" (Helm and Hudson from the Band)		Neil Young, Ronnie Wood, Eric Clapton, Dr. John, Paul Butterfield, Ringo Starr, Stephen Stills, Carl Radle	9:10
11.	"Don't Do It"	B. Holland-L. Dozier-E. Holland		6:19
12.	"Greensleeves"	traditional		1:37

Disc four: "The Last Waltz Suite"
No.	Title	Guest performer(s)	Length
1.	"The Well"		3:32
2.	"Evangeline"	Emmylou Harris	3:10
3.	"Out of the Blue"		3:20
4.	"The Weight" (Mavis Staples and Pops Staples take lead vocals respectively on the second and third verses)	The Staples	4:35
5.	"The Last Waltz Refrain"		1:32
6.	"Theme from The Last Waltz"		3:26

Disc four: Concert rehearsal
No.	Title	Writer(s)	Guest performer(s)	Length
7.	"King Harvest (Has Surely Come)"			3:52
8.	"Tura Lura Lural (That's an Irish Lullaby)"	James Royce Shannon	Van Morrison	3:52
9.	"Caravan"	Van Morrison	Van Morrison	6:30
10.	"Such a Night"	Mac Rebennack	Dr. John	5:24
11.	"Rag Mama Rag"			3:52

Disc four: Studio ideas
No.	Title	Length
12.	"Mad Waltz" (early version of "The Well")	5:30
13.	"The Last Waltz Refrain" (early instrumental version)	0:50
14.	"The Last Waltz Theme" (sketch track)	3:34

=== Box set personnel ===
The Band

- Rick Danko – bass, fiddle, vocals
- Levon Helm – drums, mandolin, vocals
- Garth Hudson – organ, piano, accordion, synthesizers, clavinet, horns
- Richard Manuel – piano, drums, organ, clavinet, dobro, vocals
- Robbie Robertson – guitars, piano, vocals

Horns

- Rich Cooper – trumpet, flugelhorn
- James Gordon – flute, tenor saxophone, clarinet
- Jerry Hey – trumpet, flugelhorn
- Howard Johnson – tuba, baritone saxophone, flugelhorn, bass clarinet
- Charlie Keagle – clarinet, flute, alto, tenor and soprano saxophones
- Tom Malone – trombone, euphonium, alto flute, bass trombone
- Larry Packer – electric violin
- Horns arranged by Henry Glover, Garth Hudson, Howard Johnson, Tom Malone, John Simon and Allen Toussaint

Guests

- Paul Butterfield – harmonica, vocals
- Bobby Charles – vocals
- Eric Clapton – guitar, vocals
- Neil Diamond – guitar, vocals
- Dr. John – piano, guitar, congas, vocals
- Bob Dylan – guitar, vocals
- Emmylou Harris – guitar, vocals studio portion
- Ronnie Hawkins – vocals
- Bob Margolin – guitar
- Joni Mitchell – guitar, vocals
- Van Morrison – vocals
- Pinetop Perkins – piano, vocals
- Carl Radle – bass
- Dennis St. John – drums
- John Simon – piano
- Cleotha Staples – harmony vocal studio portion
- Mavis Staples – vocals studio portion
- Roebuck "Pops" Staples – guitar, vocals studio portion
- Yvonne Staples – harmony vocal studio portion
- Ringo Starr – drums
- Stephen Stills – guitar
- Muddy Waters – vocals
- Ronnie Wood – guitar
- Neil Young – guitar, harmonica, vocals

Technical personnel

- Robbie Robertson – producer
- John Simon and Rob Fraboni – co-producers
- Ed Anderson – recording and mixing engineer
- Terry Becker, Neil Brody, Tim Kramer, Elliot Mazer and Wayne Neuendorf – recording engineers
- Baker Bigsby, Tony Bustos and Jeremy Zatkin – mixing engineers
- Bill Graham – concert production
- John Simon – string arrangements

== Certifications ==
Certifications for The Last Waltz
Region	Certification	Certified units/sales
United Kingdom (BPI)	Gold	100,000^{‡}
^{‡} Sales+streaming figures based on certification alone.
