= Rockin' Chair (The Band song) =

Song by the Band

from the album The Band
- Released: September 22, 1969
- Length: 3:43
- Label: Capitol
- Songwriter: Robbie Robertson
- Producer: John Simon

"Rockin' Chair" is a song by the Canadian-American rock band the Band, released as the eighth track on their second studio album The Band (1969).

== Background and composition ==
"Rockin' Chair" is a song about two lifelong sailor friends, with one convincing the other one nicknamed "Ragtime Willie" to return home where the one narrating believes the two can live out their days together, and was written by Robbie Robertson, and Robertson "takes a look at the autumn years" according to American Songwriter critic Jim Beviglia. According to Robertson on the elderly; "I'm knocked out by older people, [...] Just look at their eyes. Hear them talk. They're not joking. They've seen things you’ll never see." Robertson also said of the song that "It's a story about someone who passes something on to you, and you pass it on to someone else, [..] But it's something you take to heart and carry with you your whole life."

== Release and reception ==
British music critic Barney Hoskyns wrote that "On the exquisite "Rockin' Chair", he was a septuagenarian seadog finally come home to ‘old Virginny’ to spend his last days with his crony". In a ranking of the band's 20 "classic rock gems" for uDiscover Music, Jamis Atkins placed it a number 3, writing it "transports the listener to another time, with Helm on mandolin, Hudson's wheezing accordion and some of the finest close-knit harmonies of The Band’s career." In a retrospective review for the Band's debut album for Pitchfork, Steven Hyden notes that Rick Danko, Richard Manuel and Levon Helm all "weave their voices in and out of conventional harmony, typical of a conversational vocal style referencing the call-and-response cadence of gospel as well as back-porch mountain music and countless barroom sing-alongs." Jim Beviglia placed it a number 2 in a ranking of 10 songs by the group fans may not have heard for CultureSonar, believing that "This bittersweet and relatively obscure chanty about two old sea dogs looking to return home to live out their final days will have you smiling through your tears." Beviglia also placed it a number 10 in a ranking of the band's 20 best songs for American Songwriter, believing Robertson to be the only person that could have written it, calling it "the kind of gentle sound which can send you to slumber, albeit with a tinge of sweet melancholy brought about by the aching harmonies." A live recording from the Academy of Music in 1971 was released on Live at the Academy of Music 1971.

== Cover versions ==
The American rock band Death Cab for Cutie contributed a cover of the track to the 2007 tribute album Endless Highway: The Music of the Band.
