= Cahoots (album) =

Studio album by the Band
- Released: September 15, 1971
- Recorded: Early 1971
- Studio: Bearsville (Woodstock, New York)
- Genres: Roots rock; folk rock; country rock; Americana
- Length: 46:41
- Label: Capitol
- Producer: The Band

The Band chronology
Stage Fright (1970)	Cahoots (1971)	Rock of Ages (1972)

Singles from Cahoots
- 1. "Life Is a Carnival" / "The Moon Struck One" Released: 1971

Professional ratings
Review scores
Source	Rating
AllMusic	3.5/5 stars
Christgau's Record Guide	B−
Entertainment Weekly	B−
MusicHound	3/5
Pitchfork	5.8/10
Q	3/5 stars
Rolling Stone	3/5 stars
The Rolling Stone Album Guide	2.5/5 stars

Cahoots is the fourth studio album by Canadian-American rock band the Band. It was released on September 15, 1971 to mixed reviews, and was their last album of original material for four years. The album's front cover was painted by New York artist/illustrator Gilbert Stone, while the back cover features a photograph portrait of the group by Richard Avedon. The album features guest vocals from Van Morrison. Libby Titus, the partner of drummer Levon Helm and mother of their daughter Amy Helm, also contributed uncredited backing vocals to "The River Hymn".

Rolling Stone critic Jon Landau described the mood of the album as being "filled with a 'tinge of extinction.'"

In 2021, a "50th Anniversary" edition of the album was released containing a remix of the original tracks plus outtakes and a partial concert recording from the Olympia Theatre, Paris in May 1971.

== Track listing ==
All tracks are written by Robbie Robertson, except where noted.

Side one
No.	Title	Writer(s)	Lead vocals	Length
1.	"Life Is a Carnival"	Rick Danko, Levon Helm, Robbie Robertson	Danko and Helm	3:55
2.	"When I Paint My Masterpiece"	Bob Dylan	Helm	4:21
3.	"Last of the Blacksmiths"		Richard Manuel	3:41
4.	"Where Do We Go from Here?"		Danko	3:47
5.	"4% Pantomime"	Robertson, Van Morrison	Manuel, Morrison	4:32

Side two
No.	Title	Lead vocals	Length
1.	"Shoot Out in Chinatown"	Manuel, Danko, Helm	2:51
2.	"The Moon Struck One"	Manuel	4:09
3.	"Thinkin' Out Loud"	Danko	3:19
4.	"Smoke Signal"	Helm	5:11
5.	"Volcano"	Danko	3:05
6.	"The River Hymn"	Helm	4:40

2000 reissue bonus tracks
No.	Title	Writer(s)	Lead vocals	Length
12.	"Endless Highway" (early studio take)		Manuel	3:46
13.	"When I Paint My Masterpiece" (alternate take)	Dylan	Helm	3:57
14.	"Bessie Smith" (outtake)	Danko, Robertson	Robertson, Danko	4:17
15.	"Don't Do It" (outtake – studio version)	Holland–Dozier–Holland	Helm	3:54
16.	"Radio Commercial"			1:04

=== 2022 50th Anniversary Deluxe Edition ===
Disc one - Cahoots 2021 Remix
No.	Title	Length

Disc one - Bonus Tracks
No.	Title	Length
12.	"Endless Highway" (Early Studio Take)	3:54
13.	"When I Paint My Masterpiece" (Alternate Take)	4:13
14.	"4% Pantomime" (Takes 1 & 2)	6:04
15.	"Don't Do It" (Outtake - Studio Version)	3:56
16.	"Bessie Smith" (Outtake)	4:18

Disc two - Live At The Olympia Theatre, Paris May 1971 (Bootleg, Partial Concert)
No.	Title	Length
1.	"The W.S. Walcott Medicine Show"	4:02
2.	"We Can Talk"	3:32
3.	"Loving You Is Sweeter Than Ever"	3:50
4.	"The Night They Drove Old Dixie Down"	4:02
5.	"Across The Great Divide"	4:00
6.	"The Unfaithful Servant"	4:31
7.	"Baby Don't You Do It"	4:45
8.	"The Genetic Method"	5:04
9.	"Chest Fever"	6:58
10.	"Rag Mama Rag"	5:28
11.	"Slippin' and Slidin'"	3:45

Disc two - Bonus Tracks
No.	Title	Length
12.	"Life Is A Carnival" (Instrumental)	3:56
13.	"Volcano" (Instrumental)	3:05
14.	"Thinkin' Out Loud" (Stripped Down Mix)	3:26

== Personnel ==
The Band

- Rick Danko – bass, acoustic guitar, vocals
- Levon Helm – drums, mandolin, bass, vocals
- Garth Hudson – organ, accordion, piano, saxophones
- Richard Manuel – piano, drums, marimba, vocals
- Robbie Robertson – electric and acoustic guitars, piano

Additional personnel

- Allen Toussaint – brass arrangements on "Life Is a Carnival"
- Van Morrison – co-lead vocals on "4% Pantomime"
- Libby Titus – uncredited backing vocals on "The River Hymn"
- Mark Harman – engineer

== Charts ==
Chart performance for Cahoots
Chart (1971)	Peak position
Canada Top Albums/CDs (RPM)	15
Dutch Albums (Album Top 100)	2
Norwegian Albums (VG-lista)	20
UK Albums (Official Charts)	41
US Billboard 200	21
