= Go Go Liza Jane =

"Go Go Liza Jane" is a single by Levon and the Hawks, released in 1968 by Atco Records in order to capitalize on the growing success of the Band, who had recorded the track along with two others ("The Stones I Throw" and "He Don't Love You") in 1965 as Levon and the Hawks. The song, an upbeat version of the traditional "Little Liza Jane", demonstrated, three years before their debut LP, the way in which the voices of the singers in the Band, Rick Danko, Richard Manuel and Levon Helm, meshed brilliantly. Each also took turns singing lead.

It was backed, as the original 1965 single had been, with "He Don't Love You (And He'll Break Your Heart)" by Robbie Robertson.

== Group members ==
- Rick Danko – bass, vocals
- Levon Helm – drums, vocals
- Garth Hudson – organ
- Richard Manuel – handclaps, vocals
- Robbie Robertson – guitar
