= Rock of Ages (The Band album) =

Live album by the Band
- Released: August 15, 1972
- Recorded: December 28–31, 1971
- Venues: Academy of Music, New York City
- Genre: Roots rock
- Length: 78:19
- Label: Capitol SABB 11045
- Producer: The Band

The Band chronology
Cahoots (1971)	Rock of Ages (1972)	Moondog Matinee (1973)

Professional ratings
Review scores
Source	Rating
AllMusic	4/5 stars
Christgau's Record Guide	B
DownBeat	4.5/5 stars
Entertainment Weekly	A
MusicHound	5/5
Q	4/5 stars
The Rolling Stone Album Guide	4/5 stars

Rock of Ages: The Band in Concert is a live album by the Band, released in 1972. It was compiled from recordings made during their series of shows at the Academy of Music in New York City, from December 28 through December 31, 1971. It peaked at No. 6 on the Billboard 200 chart, and was certified a gold record by the RIAA. An expanded release of recordings taken from the same series of shows, called Live at the Academy of Music 1971, was released in 2013.

== Concerts ==
The Band booked a residency at the Academy of Music for the last week of 1971, culminating in a New Year's Eve performance. Four nights were recorded, December 28 through 31.

Robbie Robertson had commissioned New Orleans songwriter and arranger Allen Toussaint to compose horn charts for their recent single "Life Is a Carnival" from the album Cahoots, and decided to have Toussaint write special charts for a five-man horn section to augment the group at the upcoming concerts. The initial charts written by Toussaint in New Orleans were in luggage lost at the airport, and a new set was composed in a cabin near Robertson's house in Woodstock. Robertson selected eleven songs to receive horn charts (all of the original Rock of Ages album except for "Get Up Jake", "Stage Fright", "This Wheel's on Fire", "The Weight", "The Shape I'm In", and "The Genetic Method.").

The repertoire consisted of material from all four of the Band's studio albums up to that point, plus one new original song, "Get Up Jake", and three covers. The group played the 1964 Motown hit single "Baby Don't You Do It" by Marvin Gaye, another Motown song, the 1966 hit single "Loving You Is Sweeter Than Ever" by the Four Tops, and "(I Don't Want To) Hang Up My Rock and Roll Shoes", the b-side of Chuck Willis' final single.

Bob Dylan, their old employer, made a surprise visit on the New Year's Eve show, playing the final four songs with the group in the early morning hours of January 1, 1972. The horn section added spontaneous flourishes to "Down in the Flood" and "Like a Rolling Stone".

== Releases ==
These recordings have been released many times, with significant changes to the track list, running order, and mix. Originally released in 1972 as a double album, it was reissued in 1980 as two separate LPs, titled Rock of Ages, Vol. 1 and Rock of Ages, Vol. 2. The first edition on compact disc in 1987 was an "abridged version"; "The Genetic Method" (Garth Hudson's instrumental solo/introduction to "Chest Fever") was omitted, but later re-instated on the two-disc version released in 1990. A budget re-release on CD was also issued in 1990 named The Night They Drove Old Dixie Down: The Best of the Band Live in Concert. On May 8, 2001, an expanded and remastered two-disc edition appeared, with the original album on one disc, and an additional ten tracks on a bonus disc, including the four songs with Bob Dylan from his guest appearance on the final night.

The 2005 retrospective box set A Musical History contains nine tracks from these concerts, newly remixed from the multitrack tapes, including a previously unreleased performance of the song "Smoke Signal" from the December 28 show. A hybrid SACD reissue of the original album was released on the Mobile Fidelity Sound Lab label in 2010.

In 2013, Capitol released Live at the Academy of Music 1971: The Rock of Ages Concerts, as both a two-CD set and as a box set, which contains a new stereo mix of all previously released material from the concerts with a new running order, plus the previously unreleased performance of "Strawberry Wine" from the December 28 show. The box set includes the same two discs, plus two additional discs containing the complete December 31 show in its entirety (11 tracks are duplicates of the first two discs, but the rest were previously unreleased), and a DVD containing most of the first two discs of audio in 5.1 surround mixes and video of "King Harvest (Has Surely Come)" and "The W.S. Walcott Medicine Show."

The songs "Chest Fever" and "The Weight" from this album are available as downloadable content for the video game Rock Band.

== Track listing ==
=== Rock of Ages ===
==== Side one ====
All tracks are written by Robbie Robertson except where noted.

No.	Title	Writer(s)	Recording date	Length
1.	"Introduction by Robertson"			1:22
2.	"Don't Do It"	Brian Holland, Lamont Dozier, Eddie Holland Jr.	December 29	5:00
3.	"King Harvest (Has Surely Come)"		December 31	4:04
4.	"Caledonia Mission"		December 30	3:38
5.	"Get Up Jake"		December 30	3:33
6.	"The W.S. Walcott Medicine Show"		December 31	3:54

==== Side two ====
No.	Title	Writer(s)	Recording date	Length
1.	"Stage Fright"		December 31	4:38
2.	"The Night They Drove Old Dixie Down"		December 29	4:34
3.	"Across the Great Divide"		December 30	3:59
4.	"This Wheel's on Fire"	Rick Danko, Bob Dylan	December 29	4:07
5.	"Rag Mama Rag"		December 31	4:33

==== Side three ====
No.	Title	Writer(s)	Recording date	Length
1.	"The Weight"		December 30	5:32
2.	"The Shape I'm In"		December 31	4:14
3.	"The Unfaithful Servant"		December 31	4:48
4.	"Life Is a Carnival"	Levon Helm, Robertson, Danko	December 30	4:17

==== Side four ====
No.	Title	Writer(s)	Recording date	Length
1.	"The Genetic Method"	Garth Hudson	December 31	7:48
2.	"Chest Fever"		December 28	5:24
3.	"(I Don't Want to) Hang Up My Rock and Roll Shoes"	Chuck Willis	December 29	4:20

==== 2000 reissue bonus disc ====
No.	Title	Writer(s)	Recording date	Length
1.	"Loving You Is Sweeter Than Ever"	Stevie Wonder, Ivy Jo Hunter	December 29	3:28
2.	"I Shall Be Released"	Dylan	December 30	4:03
3.	"Up on Cripple Creek"		December 30	4:38
4.	"The Rumor"		December 30	5:02
5.	"Rockin' Chair"		December 29	4:06
6.	"Time to Kill"		December 28	4:07
7.	"Down in the Flood"	Dylan	December 31	5:25
8.	"When I Paint My Masterpiece"	Dylan	December 31	4:17
9.	"Don't Ya Tell Henry"	Dylan	December 31	4:38
10.	"Like a Rolling Stone"	Dylan	December 31	5:24

=== Live at the Academy of Music 1971 ===
==== Disc one ====
No.	Title	Writer(s)	Recording date	Length
1.	"The W.S. Walcott Medicine Show"		December 31	3:50
2.	"The Shape I'm In"		December 31	3:49
3.	"Caledonia Mission"		December 30	3:20
4.	"Don't Do It"	Brian Holland, Lamont Dozier, Eddie Holland Jr.	December 29	4:28
5.	"Stage Fright"		December 31	4:22
6.	"I Shall Be Released"	Bob Dylan	December 30	4:01
7.	"Up on Cripple Creek"		December 30	4:40
8.	"This Wheel's on Fire"	Rick Danko, Bob Dylan	December 29	3:48
9.	"Strawberry Wine"	Robbie Robertson, Levon Helm	December 28	3:31
10.	"King Harvest (Has Surely Come)"		December 31	3:58
11.	"Time to Kill"		December 28	4:09
12.	"The Night They Drove Old Dixie Down"		December 29	4:41
13.	"Across the Great Divide"		December 30	3:28

==== Disc two ====
No.	Title	Writer(s)	Recording date	Length
1.	"Life Is a Carnival"	Levon Helm, Robbie Robertson, Rick Danko	December 30	4:04
2.	"Get Up Jake"		December 30	3:17
3.	"Rag Mama Rag"		December 31	4:04
4.	"The Unfaithful Servant"		December 31	4:30
5.	"The Weight"		December 30	5:16
6.	"Rockin' Chair"		December 29	4:04
7.	"Smoke Signal"		December 28	5:20
8.	"The Rumor"		December 30	5:04
9.	"The Genetic Method"	Garth Hudson	December 31	7:31
10.	"Chest Fever"		December 28	5:08
11.	"(I Don't Want to) Hang Up My Rock and Roll Shoes"	Chuck Willis	December 29	4:36
12.	"Loving You Is Sweeter Than Ever"	Stevie Wonder, Ivy Jo Hunter	December 29	3:31
13.	"Down in the Flood"	Dylan	December 31	5:11
14.	"When I Paint My Masterpiece"	Dylan	December 31	4:57
15.	"Don't Ya Tell Henry"	Dylan	December 31	3:55
16.	"Like a Rolling Stone"	Dylan	December 31	5:26

== Personnel ==
The Band at the Academy of Music concerts
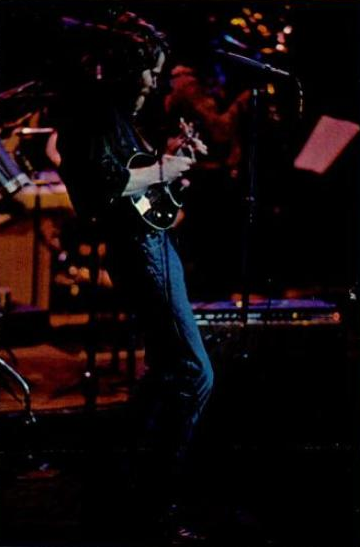
Levon Helm

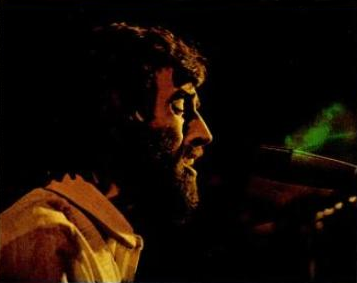
Richard Manuel

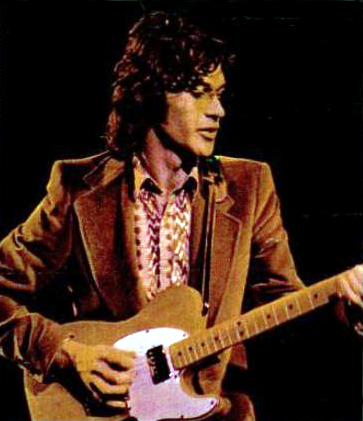
Robbie Robertson

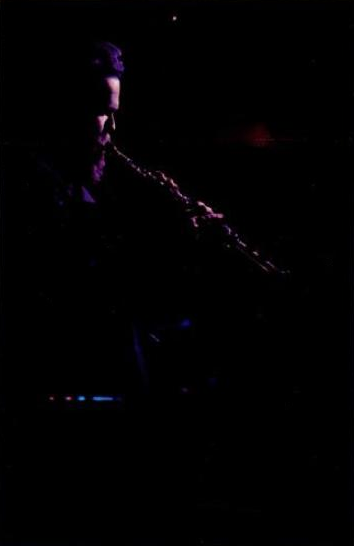
Garth Hudson

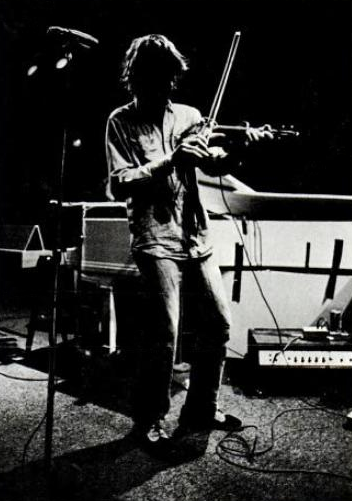
Rick Danko

The Band

- Robbie Robertson – guitar, backing vocals, introduction
- Garth Hudson – organ, piano, accordion, tenor and soprano saxophone solos
- Richard Manuel – vocals, piano, organ, clavinet, drums
- Rick Danko – vocals, bass guitar, violin
- Levon Helm – vocals, drums, mandolin

Additional musicians

- Howard Johnson – tuba, euphonium, baritone saxophone
- Snooky Young – trumpet, flugelhorn
- Joe Farrell – tenor and soprano saxophones, English horn
- Earl McIntyre – trombone
- J.D. Parron – alto saxophone and E-flat clarinet
- Bob Dylan – vocals, guitar on "Down in the Flood", "When I Paint My Masterpiece", "Don't Ya Tell Henry", and "Like a Rolling Stone"

Production

- Allen Toussaint – horn arrangements
- Phil Ramone – engineer
- Mark Harman – engineer

== Charts ==
Chart performance for Rock of Ages
Chart (1972)	Peak position
Dutch Albums (Album Top 100)	3
US Billboard 200	6

== Certifications ==
Certifications for Rock of Ages
Region	Certification	Certified units/sales
United States (RIAA)	Gold	500,000^{^}
^{^} Shipments figures based on certification alone.
