= Rag Mama Rag =

Single by the Band

from the album The Band
- B-side: "The Unfaithful Servant"
- Released: 1970
- Recorded: 1969
- Genre: Roots rock
- Length: 3:04
- Label: Capitol Records
- Songwriter: Robbie Robertson
- Producer: John Simon

Official audio
- "Rag Mam Rag" on YouTube

"Rag Mama Rag" is a song by the Band which was first released on their 1969 album The Band. It was also released as a single, reaching number 16 on the UK Singles Chart, the highest position for any single by the group. The single was less successful in the US, reaching only number 57 on the Billboard Hot 100.

== Music and lyrics ==
"Rag Mama Rag" is credited solely to Robbie Robertson. However, drummer Levon Helm claimed years later that the song was a group effort. The song has an improvised feel. The Band initially attempted to record the song in a straightforward manner, but it did not sound right to Robertson. So, drummer Helm moved to play mandolin, pianist Richard Manuel played drums, bassist Rick Danko played fiddle and producer John Simon played tuba, while organist Garth Hudson played upright acoustic piano in a ragtime fashion. Helm also sang the lead vocals.

Although a favorite with fans, the band did not originally think that highly of the song, recording it almost as an afterthought. Robertson claims that, "It didn't have very much importance until we recorded it, but it showed something else we could do, in a style that didn't exist." In The New Rolling Stone Album Guide, Matt Kemp described the song as a "rural dance tune." According to Goldmine critic Rob Bowman, the lyrics are "about a rather curious mind-twisting woman". AllMusic critic Thomas Ward views the lyrics as "almost nonsensical". The Band biographer Barney Hoskyns describes the lyrics as "lusty tomcat lyrics", noting that both the lyrics and the instrumentation, particularly the ragtime piano, make the song seem like "Storyville 'brothel music'". Something Else! critic Nick DeRiso described the lyrics as "randy" stating that the song "becomes a moment of boozy, brothel-shaking joy". Steve Millward interprets "Rag Mama Rag" as a "gently satirical" song about "a hapless country bumpkin" who "can't control his girlfriend".

== Reception ==
AllMusic critic Stephen Thomas Erlewine describes "Rag Mama Rag" as a "rollicking uptempo number." Hoskyns claims that the song sounds like it "came straight out of turn-of-the-century New Orleans." Musician Dr. John claimed that the song sounded "like a cross between Memphis and New Orleans." Ward describes the song as a "wonderful, swinging song with some of the Band's most perfect playing (which is saying something)..." According to Ward, unlike most Band songs, "Rag Mama Rag" owes its success more to the music than the lyrics. DeRiso rated "Rag Mama Rag" as one of the five essential Levon Helm songs with the Band. DeRiso commented on how the song sounds improvised at first but on closer listen the "song rambles along with a focused, air-tight groove" with the group in "complete control" even while making the song sound like "a goof."

Cash Box said that it "has the rhythmic enthusiasm and sound appeal of ['Up on Cripple Creek']." Record World said that "the best rock band in the country sounds magnificent." Billboard called it a "down-home entry" with "first rate" performance and production.

== Performers ==
- Levon Helm – vocals, mandolin
- Richard Manuel – drums, harmonica
- Rick Danko – fiddle
- Garth Hudson – upright piano
- Robbie Robertson – electric guitar

with:

- John Simon – tuba

== Other versions ==
"Rag Mama Rag" has appeared on a number of The Band compilation albums, including Anthology, To Kingdom Come: The Definitive Collection, Across the Great Divide, Greatest Hits and A Musical History. Live performances from the 1970s appear on Rock of Ages, released in 1972, as well as on The Last Waltz (2002 album), the 2002 re-release of the 1978 album.

Little Feat covered "Rag Mama Rag" on their 2000 album Chinese Work Songs. Musicians such as Bruce Springsteen, Phil Lesh, and Steve Earle & The Dukes have also covered the song in concert.
