= When I Paint My Masterpiece =

1971 Bob Dylan song

Song by The Band

from the album Cahoots
- Released: September 15, 1971
- Genre: Folk rock
- Length: 4:21
- Label: Capitol
- Songwriter: Bob Dylan
- Producer: The Band

"When I Paint My Masterpiece"

Song by Bob Dylan

from the album Bob Dylan's Greatest Hits Vol. II
- Released: November 17, 1971
- Recorded: 16–19 March 1971
- Studio: Blue Rock, New York City
- Genre: Folk rock
- Length: 3:22
- Label: Columbia
- Songwriter: Bob Dylan
- Producer: Leon Russell

"When I Paint My Masterpiece" is a 1971 song by Bob Dylan. It was first released by The Band, which recorded it on its album Cahoots, released on September 15, 1971.

== Background ==
Dylan first recorded the song at New York's Blue Rock Studio, backed by Leon Russell and session musicians, including Jesse Ed Davis on lead guitar. The recording sessions lasted from March 16 to 19, 1971, and also saw the recording of the 45 RPM single "Watching the River Flow", released by CBS Records on June 3, 1971. Both songs appeared on Bob Dylan's Greatest Hits Vol. II, released November 17, 1971, with Russell credited as the songs' producer.

During the 1971 sessions at Blue Rock Studio, Dylan also recorded a solo version with slightly different lyrics, accompanying himself on piano. This version was released in 2013 on The Bootleg Series Vol. 10: Another Self Portrait (1969–1971).

Dylan and The Band performed the song together live in the early hours of January 1, 1972, at a New Year's Eve concert by The Band; a recording was released as a bonus track on the 2001 CD reissue of The Band's live album Rock of Ages.

== Reception and legacy ==
Douglas Brinkley, while interviewing Dylan for the New York Times in 2020, noted that "When I Paint My Masterpiece" was a song that had grown on him over the years and asked Dylan why he had brought it "back to the forefront of recent concerts". Dylan replied: "It's grown on me as well. I think this song has something to do with the classical world, something that's out of reach. Someplace you'd like to be beyond your experience. Something that is so supreme and first-rate that you could never come back down from the mountain. That you've achieved the unthinkable. That's what the song tries to say, and you'd have to put it in that context. In saying that, though, even if you do paint your masterpiece, what will you do then? Well, obviously you have to paint another masterpiece".

Los Lobos' Steve Berlin cited it as his favorite Dylan song in a 2021 Stereogum article, writing, "I love the way he creates such a vivid world in a three-minute song, and as a former constant traveler myself he captures the often delightful feeling of disconnection in a new unfamiliar place, and then the line about the land of Coca-Cola brings it all back home".

== In popular culture ==
Dylan performs the song live (as a duet with Bob Neuwirth) during the opening credits of his 1978 film Renaldo and Clara. He also performed a version of it, with substantially rewritten lyrics, to open his 2021 concert film Shadow Kingdom: The Early Songs of Bob Dylan.

During the closing credits of the 2013 documentary film Tim's Vermeer, Dylan sings an alternate take of the song.

The song appears in the opening credits of "Observe and Report".

== Live performances ==
According to his official website, Dylan played the song live 182 times between 1975 and 2019. Five live performances of the song from Dylan's 1975 Rolling Thunder Revue tour were released on the 2019 box set The Rolling Thunder Revue: The 1975 Live Recordings. The live debut occurred at the War Memorial Auditorium in Plymouth, Massachusetts, on October 30, 1975, and became a mainstay of the Rough and Rowdy Ways World Wide Tour, appearing on the set list on more than 340 consecutive nights between 2021 and 2024. As of June 2026, he had performed the song 499 times.

== Notable covers ==
The Grateful Dead often played "When I Paint My Masterpiece" in concerts starting in 1987, sometimes alongside other Dylan songs. Though Grateful Dead vocalist Bob Weir sang lead on the song, lead singer Jerry Garcia had played it as early as 1972 with Merl Saunders and John Kahn, both of whom became members of the Jerry Garcia Band.

The Band (without Robbie Robertson or Richard Manuel) performed the song at a 1992 Dylan tribute concert. The recording was released on the CD of the event.

Chris Whitley recorded a blues version of the song for his last album, Dislocation Blues, which was released with Jeff Lang in 2005.

Elliott Brood performed "When I Paint My Masterpiece" on CBC Radio 2's Up Close program, and includes it in some of its concerts.

The bluegrass band Greensky Bluegrass included a live version of the song on its 2010 live album All Access: Volume 1, recorded at The Riviera Theatre in Three Rivers, Michigan. The song has a regular rotation in the band's live performances.

Blake Mills performed a live solo version of "When I Paint My Masterpiece" on Dylan's Stratocaster guitar to celebrate the 50th anniversary of Dylan's performance at the 1965 Newport Folk Festival.

Steve Harley included a version of “When I Paint My Masterpiece” as the closing track on his 2020 album Uncovered. This was the last song on his last solo recording.

Sturgill Simpson covered it at Massey Hall in Toronto, Ontario, on November 21, 2024, telling the audience, "here's a Canadian song for you". It was the first time he had played it in concert.

== Personnel for studio recording released on Cahoots by The Band ==
- Levon Helm - lead vocals, mandolin
- Robbie Robertson - acoustic guitar
- Garth Hudson - accordion
- Rick Danko - bass
- Richard Manuel - drums

== Personnel for Bob Dylan studio recording, March 1971 ==
- Bob Dylan - vocal, guitar & harmonica
- Leon Russell - piano
- Jesse Ed Davis - guitar
- Don Preston - guitar
- Carl Radle - bass
- Jim Keltner - drums
- Claudia Lennear & Kathi McDonald - backing vocals
