= Life Is a Carnival =

- Dutch cover

Single by the Band

from the album Cahoots
- B-side: "The Moon Struck One"
- Released: 1971
- Recorded: Early 1971
- Genre: Roots rock, Americana
- Length: 3:50
- Label: Capitol Records
- Songwriters: Levon Helm, Robbie Robertson, Rick Danko
- Producer: The Band

"Life Is a Carnival" is the opening track of the Band's fourth album, Cahoots. Written by Rick Danko, Levon Helm, and Robbie Robertson, the song features horn arrangements by New Orleans musician Allen Toussaint. The song is the only track from the Cahoots album included on the original releases of Rock of Ages and The Last Waltz. The song was featured in the Bill Murray movie Larger Than Life.

Billboard called it a "funky beat swinger with a potent lyric line." Cash Box said that the "lyrics are of utmost importance." Record World said "With the funkiest introduction, premier underground act will greatly add to their legion of fans."

Musical notation for this song is printed on a wall behind Levon Helm's grave in Woodstock, New York.

== Personnel ==
Credits are adapted from the liner notes of A Musical History.

- Robbie Robertson – electric and acoustic guitars
- Garth Hudson – Lowrey organ
- Richard Manuel – Hohner Pianet electric piano, backing vocals
- Rick Danko – bass guitar, co-lead vocals
- Levon Helm – drums, co-lead vocals

Horn arrangements by Allen Toussaint; horn players uncredited.

== Chart performance ==
Chart (1971)	Peak position
Canadian RPM Singles Chart	25
U.S. Billboard Hot 100	72
