= The Band (album) =

Studio album by the Band
- Released: September 22, 1969
- Studios: Pool House, 8850 Evanview Drive (Los Angeles); The Hit Factory (New York City)
- Genres: Roots rock; folk rock; country rock; Americana
- Length: 43:50
- Label: Capitol
- Producer: John Simon

The Band chronology
Music from Big Pink (1968)	The Band (1969)	Stage Fright (1970)

Singles from The Band
- 1. "Up on Cripple Creek" / "The Night They Drove Old Dixie Down" Released: November 29, 1969; 2. "Rag Mama Rag" / "The Unfaithful Servant" Released: 1970

The Band, also known as The Brown Album, is the second studio album by the Canadian-American rock band the Band, released on September 22, 1969, by Capitol Records. According to Rob Bowman's liner notes for the 2000 reissue, The Band has been viewed as a concept album, with the songs focusing on people, places and traditions associated with a traditional view of Americana. Thus, many of the songs draw on historic themes, such as "The Night They Drove Old Dixie Down", "King Harvest (Has Surely Come)" and "Jawbone" (which was composed in the unusual 6/4 time signature).

== Recording ==
After unsuccessfully attempting sessions at a studio in New York the Band set up shop in the pool house of a home rented by the group in the Hollywood Hills located at 8850 Evanview Drive in Los Angeles, California. The home was then owned by Sammy Davis Jr. and had previously been owned by Judy Garland and Wally Cox. According to Robbie Robertson, the location was chosen to give the songs a Basement Tapes–like feel in what was termed "a clubhouse concept". The last song to be recorded at the pool house was "King Harvest (Has Surely Come)," as The Band had to leave to perform for three nights at Winterland in San Francisco. Afterwards, they recorded the final three songs to finish the album ("Up on Cripple Creek", "Whispering Pines" and "Jemima Surrender") at The Hit Factory in New York City, at the time operated by Jerry Ragavoy. Joe Zagarino would also take over most of the engineering for the final three tracks they would record, untrusting of Robertson's and Producer John Simon's engineering skills. The outtake "Get Up Jake" was also recorded during these sessions in New York. According to John Simon, Robertson took over most of the engineering for the record, "hungry for knowledge ... I showed him how to make an album from a technical point of view."

== Release ==
The album was originally released on September 22, 1969. A 1980 "Capitol 16000 Series" budget vinyl reissue of the album omitted "When You Awake" and "King Harvest (Has Surely Come)".

After several reissues on vinyl, cassette tape, and compact disc, the album was remastered and re-released with bonus tracks in 2000, in a process overseen by Robertson.

The Band was reissued in 2009 by Audio Fidelity as a limited edition gold CD. The reissue included "Get Up Jake", as a bonus track. "Get Up Jake", which also appears on the 2000 reissue, was slated for inclusion on the original album but was dropped from the lineup at the last minute, either because the band felt it was too similar to another track on the album or because there physically was not enough room on the album. It also was suggested that the underdeveloped status of the song made them decide against inclusion in the album. A reworked version of "Get Up Jake" was later included in many of the Band's live performances in the early 1970s and also on the 1972 live album Rock of Ages. A studio version was later included as the b-side to their "Ain't Got No Home" single in 1973.

In 2019, a 50th Anniversary Edition was released, with an entirely new stereo mix of the album by Bob Clearmountain, mastered by Bob Ludwig, as well as several outtake tracks and the Band's entire live set from the Woodstock festival.

The original LP back cover quotes the opening lines from Shelton Brooks's 1917 composition "Darktown Strutters' Ball".

== Reception ==
Professional ratings
Review scores
Source	Rating
AllMusic	5/5 stars
DownBeat	5/5 stars
The Encyclopedia of Popular Music	5/5 stars
Entertainment Weekly	A
MusicHound Rock	5/5 stars
Pitchfork	10/10
Q	5/5 stars
Rolling Stone	5/5 stars
The Rolling Stone Album Guide	5/5 stars
The Village Voice	A+

The album includes many of the Band's best-known and critically acclaimed songs, including "The Night They Drove Old Dixie Down", which Rolling Stone named the 245th-greatest song of all time in 2004 and the 249th-greatest song of all time in 2010. In 2003, the album was ranked No. 45 on Rolling Stone's list of the 500 greatest albums of all time, maintaining the rating in a 2012 revised list. In the 2020 update of that list, it was ranked No. 57. In 1998, Q readers voted The Band the 76th greatest album of all time. Time included it in their unranked 2006 list of the 100 greatest albums. Robert Christgau, having been disappointed with the Band's debut, had expected to dislike the record and even planned a column for The Village Voice to "castigate" their follow-up. Upon hearing the record, however, he declared it better than Abbey Road, which had been released four days following, writing that the Band's LP is an "A-plus record if I've ever rated one". He ranked it as the fourth-best album of the year in his ballot for Jazz & Pop magazine's annual critics poll. The album was later included in his "Basic Record Library" of 1950s and 1960s recordings, published in Christgau's Record Guide: Rock Albums of the Seventies (1981). It was voted No. 45 in the third edition of Colin Larkin's All Time Top 1000 Albums (2000).

The Band peaked at No. 9 on Billboard's Pop Albums chart. In 2000, it charted on Billboard's Internet Albums chart, peaking at No. 10. The singles "Rag Mama Rag" and "Up on Cripple Creek" peaked on the Pop Singles chart at Nos. 57 and 25 respectively. The "Rag Mama Rag" single performed better in the UK, where it reached No. 16. It was the band's highest-charting album in their native Canada, peaking at number two on the Canadian Albums Chart.

On Metacritic the expanded 50th anniversary edition of the album has an aggregate score of 96 out of 100, based on six reviews, a rating that the website defines as indicating "universal acclaim".

PopMatters critic David Pike rated "Rockin' Chair" as one of the "41 essential pop/rock songs with accordion."

Album - Billboard (United States)

Year	Chart	Position
1970	Pop Albums	9
2000	Top Internet Albums	10

Singles - Billboard (United States)

Year	Single	Chart	Position
1970	"Rag Mama Rag"	Pop Singles	57
1970	"Up on Cripple Creek"	Pop Singles	25

In 2009 The Band was preserved into the National Recording Registry for being "culturally, historically, or aesthetically significant, and/or informs or reflects life in the United States". It was also included in the book 1001 Albums You Must Hear Before You Die. At the 2017 Polaris Music Prize, the album won the jury vote for the Heritage Prize in the 1960-1975 category.

== Track listing ==
All tracks are written by Robbie Robertson, except where noted.

Side one
No.	Title	Writer(s)	Lead vocals	Length
1.	"Across the Great Divide"		Manuel	2:53
2.	"Rag Mama Rag"		Helm	3:04
3.	"The Night They Drove Old Dixie Down"		Helm	3:33
4.	"When You Awake"	Richard Manuel, Robertson	Danko	3:13
5.	"Up on Cripple Creek"		Helm	4:34
6.	"Whispering Pines"	Manuel, Robertson	Manuel with Helm	3:58

Side two
No.	Title	Writer(s)	Lead vocals	Length
1.	"Jemima Surrender"	Levon Helm, Robertson	Helm	3:31
2.	"Rockin' Chair"		Manuel	3:43
3.	"Look Out Cleveland"		Danko	3:09
4.	"Jawbone"	Manuel, Robertson	Manuel	4:20
5.	"The Unfaithful Servant"		Danko	4:17
6.	"King Harvest (Has Surely Come)"		Manuel	3:39

2000 reissue bonus tracks
No.	Title	Writer(s)	Lead vocals	Length
13.	"Get Up Jake" (Stereo mix)		Helm and Danko	2:17
14.	"Rag Mama Rag" (Alternate vocal take; rough mix)		Helm	3:05
15.	"The Night They Drove Old Dixie Down" (Alternate mix)		Helm	4:16
16.	"Up on Cripple Creek" (Alternate take)		Helm	4:51
17.	"Whispering Pines" (Alternate take)	Manuel, Robertson	Manuel	5:09
18.	"Jemima Surrender" (Alternate take)	Helm, Robertson	Helm	3:49
19.	"King Harvest (Has Surely Come)" (Alternate performance)		Manuel and Helm	4:28

== Personnel ==
The Band

- Rick Danko – vocals, bass guitar, violin, trombone
- Levon Helm – vocals, drums, mandolin, guitar
- Garth Hudson – organ, clavinet, piano, accordion, soprano, tenor and baritone saxophones, slide trumpet
- Richard Manuel – vocals, piano, drums, baritone saxophone, harmonica
- Jaime Robbie Robertson – guitars, engineer

Additional personnel

- John Simon – producer, tuba, electric piano, "high school and peck horns", engineer
- Tony May – engineer
- Joe Zagarino – engineer
- Elliott Landy – photography
- Bob Cato – album design

== See also ==
- Classic Albums

== Sources ==
- Bowman, Rob (2000). The Band (Liner notes). The Band. Capitol Records. 72435-25389-2-8.
- Harris, Craig (2014). The Band: Pioneers of Americana Music. Lanham, MD: Rowman & Littlefield. ISBN 978-0-8108-8905-7.
- Helm, Levon; Davis, Stephen (2013). This Wheel's on Fire: Levon Helm and the Story of The Band (Updated ed.). Chicago Review Press. ISBN 978-1-61374-876-3.
