= Up on Cripple Creek =

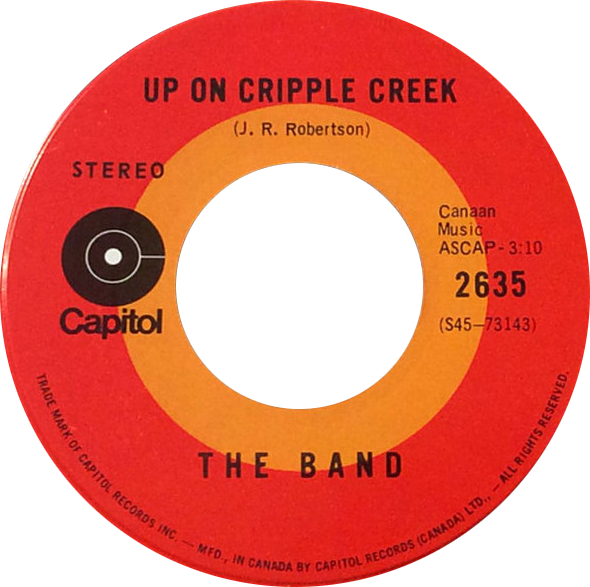
- Side A of the Canadian single

Single by the Band

from the album The Band
- A-side: "The Night They Drove Old Dixie Down"
- Released: November 29, 1969
- Recorded: 1969
- Genre: Roots rock, Americana
- Length: 4:34 (album); 3:10 (single)
- Label: Capitol
- Songwriter: Robbie Robertson
- Producer: John Simon

The Band singles chronology
"The Weight" (1968)	"Up on Cripple Creek" (1969)	"The Night They Drove Old Dixie Down" (1969)

"Up on Cripple Creek" is a song written by the Band’s guitarist Robbie Robertson which appeared on their second album The Band, with drummer Levon Helm on lead vocal. Released as a single in November 1969, it reached 25 on the Billboard Hot 100. "

A 1976 live performance of "Up on Cripple Creek" appears in the Band's concert film The Last Waltz, as well as on the accompanying soundtrack album. In addition, live performances of the song appear on Before the Flood, which records the Band's 1974 tour with Bob Dylan, as well as on the 2001 expanded edition of Rock of Ages, originally released in 1972.

The Band performed the song on The Ed Sullivan Show in November 1969.

== Writing and recording ==
Robertson said of writing the song:

I had some ideas for 'Up on Cripple Creek' when we were still based in Woodstock making Music From Big Pink. Then after Woodstock, I went to Montreal and my daughter Alexandra was born. We had been snowed in at Woodstock and in Montreal it was freezing, so we went to Hawaii, really as some kind of a way to get some warmth, and to begin preparing for making our second album. I think it was really pieces and ideas coming on during that travelling process that sparked the idea about a man who just drives these trucks across the whole country. I don’t remember where I sat down and finished the song, though.

"Up on Cripple Creek" is notable as it is one of the first instances of a Hohner clavinet being played with a wah-wah pedal. The riff can be heard after each chorus of the song. The clavinet, especially in tandem with a wah-wah pedal, was a sound that became famous in the early to mid-1970s, especially in funk music.

== Lyrics and music ==
Drawing upon the Band's musical roots—the American South, American rock and roll, and bluegrass/country—the song is sung from the point of view of a truck driver who goes to Lake Charles, Louisiana, to stay with a local girl, Bessie, with whom he has a history. In the song, he gambles, drinks, listens to music, and spends time with "little Bessie," who takes an active role in the goings-on, while expressing her opinions, further endearing herself to the narrator. At the end of the song, after exhausting himself on the road, he talks about going home to his woman, "big mama," but is tempted to return to Bessie again. He may or may not be cheating. Truckers also use the term "Big Mama" to refer to their dispatcher over CB radio. Concerns about the weather in other parts of the country and the line "this life of living on the road" suggest over-the-road trucking. At the start of the song he's hauling logs off a mountain and at the end he may be weighing options: "rolling in" to home base for a new cargo or seeing his Bessie again.

One verse has the singer and Bessie listening to and commenting on the music of 1940s and 1950s bandleader Spike Jones. Robertson said of Jones, "I was a Spike Jones admirer. I thought the way that he treated music was a healthy thing. He could take a song and do his own impression of it that was so odd and outside the box – and in many cases hilarious. I liked him a lot.”

Robertson has said of the song:

We're not dealing with people at the top of the ladder, we're saying what about that house out there in the middle of that field? What does this guy think, with that one light on upstairs, and that truck parked out there? That's who I'm curious about. What is going on in there? And just following the story of this person, and he just drives these trucks across the whole country, and he knows these characters that he drops in on, on his travels. Just following him with a camera is really what this song's all about.

Upon the single release, Record World called it a "great track."

AllMusic critic Bill Janovitz describes the melody as "light and catchy," also stating that the song has a "New Orleans groove." Janovitz also regards the "non-traditional, funky style" of Garth Hudson's clavinet playing a precursor of Stevie Wonder's similar keyboard playing on "Superstition".

== Chart performance ==
Chart (1969–1970)	Peak position
Canadian RPM Singles Chart	10
U.S. Billboard Hot 100	25

== Personnel ==
Credits are adapted from the liner notes of A Musical History.

- Levon Helm – lead vocals, drums
- Rick Danko – bass guitar, backing vocals
- Garth Hudson – clavinet with wah-wah pedal, Lowrey organ
- Richard Manuel – piano, backing vocals
- Robbie Robertson – electric guitar

== Recorded covers ==
- The Oak Ridge Boys, on their 1982 album Bobbie Sue.
- Tom Wopat, on the 1979 The Dukes of Hazzard TV show soundtrack
- Gomez, on the 2007 Band tribute album Endless Highway: The Music of The Band
- Farmboy, on the 2003 album Farmboy
- Apollo Sunshine, on the 2005 album Live at the Paradise
- Chadwick Stokes Urmston, on the 2011 album Live at the Armory
- Blackberry Smoke with Bob Weir, on the 2017 DVD An Evening At TRI
- Jack DeJohnette's quartet, on their 2017 album Hudson
- Jason Manns feat. Jensen Ackles, Mark Pellegrino, Rob Benedict & Richard Speight Jr. on Jason Manns' album Recovering with Friends 2018.

== In popular culture ==
- The hip hop duo Gang Starr sampled the rhythm track on their own song "Beyond Comprehension."
- The song played into the credits of episode 11 of the second season of The Last Man on Earth.
