= The Night They Drove Old Dixie Down =

1969 single by The Band

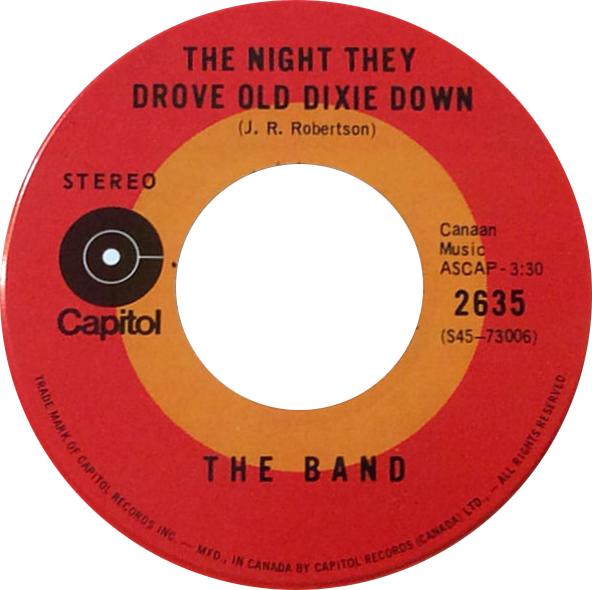
- Side B of the Canadian single

Single by the Band

from the album The Band
- A-side: "Up on Cripple Creek"
- Released: September 22, 1969
- Genre: Folk rock
- Length: 3:30
- Label: Capitol
- Songwriter: Robbie Robertson
- Producer: John Simon

The Band singles chronology
"Up on Cripple Creek" (1969)	"The Night They Drove Old Dixie Down" (1969)	"Rag Mama Rag" (1969)

Audio
- "The Night They Drove Old Dixie Down" by The Band on YouTube

"The Night They Drove Old Dixie Down" is a song written by Robbie Robertson. It was originally recorded by his Canadian-American roots rock group the Band and released on their eponymous second album in 1969. Levon Helm provided the lead vocals. The song is a first-person narrative relating the economic and social distress experienced by the protagonist, a poor white Southerner, during the last year of the American Civil War.

"The Night They Drove Old Dixie Down" was ranked number 245 on Rolling Stone magazine's 2004 list of the 500 greatest songs of all time. The song is included in the Rock and Roll Hall of Fame's "500 Songs that Shaped Rock and Roll" and in Time magazine's All-Time 100.

Joan Baez's version of "The Night They Drove Old Dixie Down" peaked at No. 3 on the Hot 100 on October 2, 1971; it did likewise on the Cashbox Top 100 chart. On the Record World Top Singles chart for the week of September 25, 1971, the Baez single hit No. 1 for one week.

== Creation and recordings ==
The song was written by Robbie Robertson, who spent about eight months working on it. Levon Helm performed lead vocals on the song. Robertson said he had the music to the song in his head and would play the chords over and over on the piano but had no idea what the song was to be about. Then the concept came to him and he researched the subject with help from the Band's drummer Levon Helm, a native of Arkansas. In his 1993 autobiography, This Wheel's on Fire, Helm wrote, "Robbie and I worked on 'The Night They Drove Old Dixie Down' up in Woodstock. I remember taking him to the library so he could research the history and geography of the era and make General Robert E. Lee come out with all due respect".

The lyrics tell of the last days of the American Civil War, portraying the suffering of the protagonist, Virgil Caine, a poor white Southerner. Dixie is the historical nickname for the states making up the Confederate States of America. The song's opening stanza refers to one of George Stoneman's raids behind Confederate lines at the end of the Civil War in 1865:

Virgil Caine is the name, and I served on the Danville train
'Til Stoneman's cavalry came and tore up the tracks again
In the winter of '65, we were hungry, just barely alive
By May the tenth, Richmond had fell, it's a time I remember, oh so well ...

A mainstay of the Band's repertoire, the song was included in every compilation covering the Band's recording career from 1968 to 1977. The Band frequently performed the song in concert, and it is included on the group's live albums Rock of Ages (1972) and Before the Flood (1974). The song was also included in the Band's Thanksgiving Day concert in 1976 (which was the subject of Martin Scorsese's documentary film The Last Waltz,) and on that film's soundtrack released in 1978.

The last time the song was performed by Helm was in The Last Waltz. Helm refused to play the song afterwards. Although it has long been believed that the reason for Helm's refusal to play the song was a dispute with Robertson over songwriting credits, Garth Hudson said that the refusal was caused by Helm's dislike for Joan Baez's cover version.

== Reception ==
"The Night They Drove Old Dixie Down" is considered one of the highlights of The Band, the group's second album, which was released in the fall of 1969.

"The Night They Drove Old Dixie Down" was ranked number 245 on Rolling Stone magazine's 2004 list of the 500 greatest songs of all time. Pitchfork Media named it the forty-second best song of the 1960s. The song is included in the Rock and Roll Hall of Fame's "500 Songs that Shaped Rock and Roll" and Time magazine's All-Time 100.

In the October 1969 U.S. edition of Rolling Stone, critic Ralph J. Gleason explained the song's impact on listeners:

Nothing I have read … has brought home the overwhelming human sense of history that this song does. The only thing I can relate it to at all is The Red Badge of Courage. It's a remarkable song, the rhythmic structure, the voice of Levon and the bass line with the drum accents and then the heavy close harmony of Levon, Richard and Rick in the theme, make it seem impossible that this isn't some traditional material handed down from father to son straight from that winter of 1865 to today. It has that ring of truth and the whole aura of authenticity.

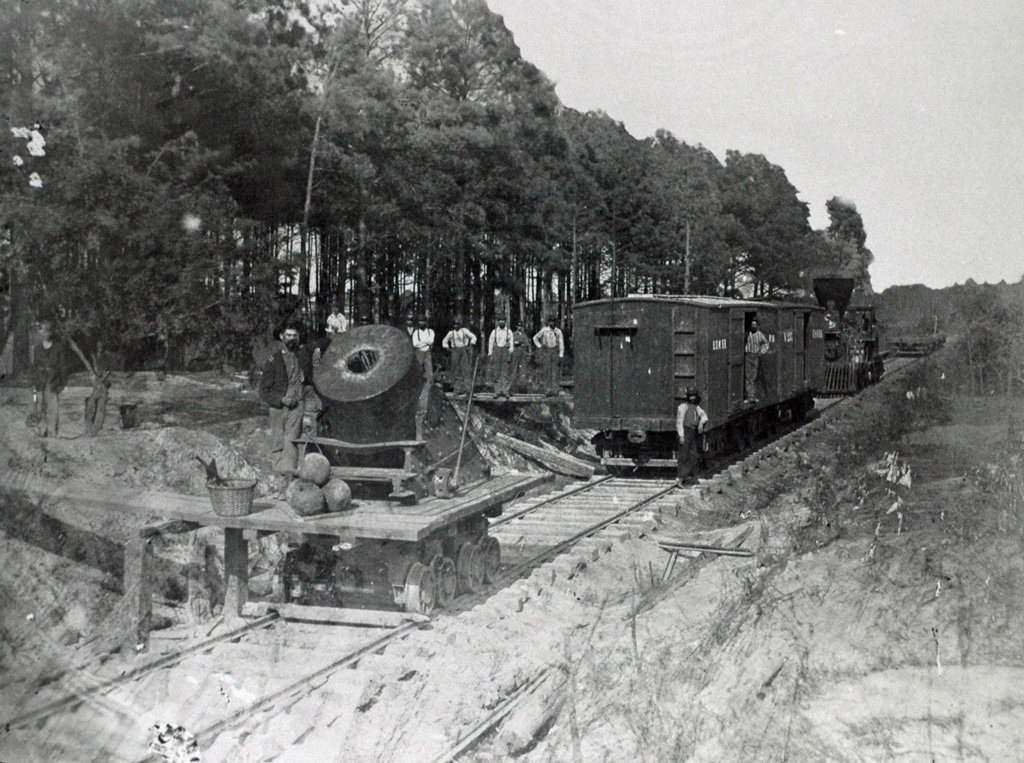
The lyrics of the song discuss the destruction of the Richmond and Danville Railroad that carried supplies for the Confederate Army at Petersburg.

Writing for Time in 2012 about the Band's performance of "The Night They Drove Old Dixie Down" during The Last Waltz, Nate Rawlings said, "Helm was the only southerner in The Band—the rest were Canadian—and he wears the pain and suffering of ordinary people in the South late in the Civil War on his face from the song’s beginning until the final strike of his drum stick".

In 2023, Dan Rys of Billboard wrote the following about "The Night They Drove Old Dixie Down":

In some ways, it’s ironic that one of the greatest songs about the American Civil War was written by a Canadian. And while sometimes criticized due to its lyrics coming from the viewpoint of a defeated Confederate soldier, the song is anything but a glorification of the Confederacy, instead a wide-eyed grappling with the aftermath of war and the devastation of the land, and of countless families, that it wrought. Levon Helm’s vocals drip with emotion, while the hook is one of the most memorable in the classic rock canon, with backing vocals that only reinforce the rawness of the subject matter at hand. It's a true testament to Robertson's songwriting ability that he was able to conjure such a nuanced song from such a brutal piece of another country's history.

=== 21st century political criticism ===
Some commentators in the 21st century have questioned whether the song's original lyrics were an endorsement of slavery and the ideology of the Lost Cause of the Confederacy. In 2009, writing in The Atlantic, African-American author Ta-Nehisi Coates characterized the song as "another story about the blues of Pharaoh," stating that he "can no more marvel at the Band than a Sioux can marvel at the cinematography of They Died With Their Boots On." In an August 2020 interview in Rolling Stone, contemporary singer-songwriter Early James described his changes to the lyrics of the song, while covering it, to oppose the Confederate cause – for example, in the first verse, "where Helm sang that the fall of the Confederacy was 'a time I remember oh so well', James declared it 'a time to bid farewell'". A 2020 editorial in The Roanoke Times argued that the song does not glorify slavery, the Confederacy, or Robert E. Lee, but rather tells the story of a poor, non-slave-holding Southerner who tries to make sense of the loss of his brother and his livelihood. Jack Hamilton, of the University of Virginia, writing in Slate, said that it is "an anti-war song first and foremost", pointing to the references to "bells ringing" and "people singing" in the chorus.

== Personnel (The Band version) ==
Sources:

- Levon Helm – lead vocals, drums
- Rick Danko – bass guitar, harmony vocals (middle)
- Garth Hudson – Lowrey organ, slide trumpet
- Richard Manuel – upright piano, harmony vocals (high)
- Robbie Robertson – acoustic guitar

== Joan Baez version ==
"The Night They Drove Old Dixie Down"
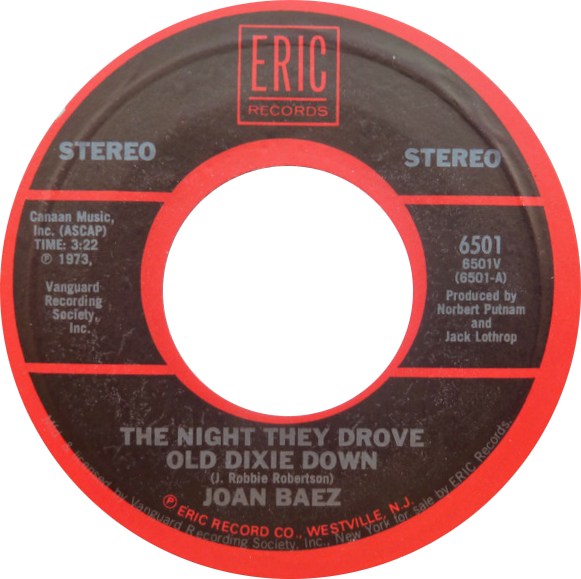
- One of US reissues

Single by Joan Baez

from the album Blessed Are...
- B-side: "When Time Is Stolen"
- Released: August 1971
- Studio: Quadrafonic Sound (Nashville, Tennessee)
- Genre: Country
- Length: 3:26
- Label: Vanguard
- Songwriter: Robbie Robertson
- Producer: Norbert Putnam

Joan Baez singles chronology
"Sweet Sir Galahad" (1969)	"The Night They Drove Old Dixie Down" (1971)	"Love Song to a Stranger" (1971)

The most successful version of "The Night They Drove Old Dixie Down" was Joan Baez's version, which became a RIAA-certified Gold record on October 22, 1971. In addition to chart action on the Hot 100, the record spent five weeks atop the easy listening chart. Billboard ranked it as the No. 20 song for 1971. Baez's version of the song reached number six in the pop charts in the UK in October 1971.

On the Record World Top Singles chart for the week of September 25, 1971, the Baez version of the song ranked No. 1 for one week.

The Baez recording contained slightly different lyrics than the Band's version of the song. Baez later told Rolling Stone's Kurt Loder that she initially learned the song by listening to the recording on the Band's album, and had never seen the printed lyrics at the time she recorded it, and thus sang the lyrics as she had (mis)heard them.

=== Chart performance ===
==== Weekly singles charts ====
Chart (1971)	Peak position
Australia National Top 40 (Go-Set)	5
Canada RPM Top Singles	3
Canada RPM Adult Contemporary	1
Ireland (IRMA)	8
New Zealand (Listener)	4
UK (OCC)	6
U.S. Billboard Hot 100	3
U.S. Billboard Adult Contemporary	1
U.S. Cashbox Top 100	3
Belgium (Ultratop 50 Wallonia)	14
Norway (VG-lista)	7
Netherlands (Single Top 100)	10
South Africa (Springbok Radio)	18

==== Year-end charts ====
Chart (1971)	Rank
Canada	39
U.S. Billboard Hot 100	20
U.S. Cash Box	21

=== Certifications ===
Certifications for The Night They Drove Old Dixie Down
Region	Certification	Certified units/sales
United States (RIAA)	Gold	1,000,000^{^}
^{^} Shipments figures based on certification alone.

== See also ==
- List of anti-war songs
- List of Billboard Easy Listening number ones of 1971
- List of train songs
