= King Harvest (Has Surely Come) =

Song by The Band

from the album The Band
- Released: September 22, 1969
- Genre: Roots rock
- Length: 3:39
- Label: Capitol
- Songwriter(s): Robbie Robertson
- Producer(s): John Simon

"King Harvest (Has Surely Come)" is a song by the Band, which originally appeared as the final track on their second album, The Band.

The song is credited solely to guitarist Robbie Robertson, although drummer/singer Levon Helm claimed that "King Harvest" was a group effort. It is sung in the first person from the point of view of a poverty-stricken farmer who, with increasing desperation, details the misfortune which has befallen him: there was no rain and his crops died, his barn burned down, he has ended up on skid row. A labor union organizer appears, promising to improve things, and the narrator tells his new associates, "I'm a union man, now, all the way", but, perhaps ashamed of his homelessness begs them to "just don't judge me by my shoes." Some sources speculate the events depicted in the song are a reference to the organizing drives of the communist-affiliated Trade Union Unity League, which created share-cropper unions from 1928 to 1935, throughout the American South.

The rock critic Greil Marcus called it "The Band's song of blasted country hopes" and suggested that "King Harvest" might be Robertson's finest song and the best example of the group's approach to songwriting and performing. Author Neil Minturn praised its "dark, eerie earnestness."

The song's structure is unusual: the verses, sung by pianist Richard Manuel, are energetic, while the choruses (sung by Manuel and Levon Helm) are more subdued, in contrast to typical song structure.

The song is also known as the inspiration for the rock band King Harvest who achieved success with their single "Dancing in the Moonlight".

== Personnel ==
- Richard Manuel - lead vocals, backing vocals, piano
- Rick Danko - bass guitar
- Levon Helm - drums, backing vocals
- Garth Hudson - Lowrey organ
- Robbie Robertson - electric guitar
- John Simon - Wurlitzer electronic piano through "black box"
