= John Simon (music producer) =

American music artist and producer (born 1941)

- Born: August 11, 1941 (age 84); Norwalk, Connecticut, United States
- Occupations: Musician, producer, composer
- Instruments: Piano, saxophone, tuba, vocals
- Formerly of: The Band
- Website: johnsimonmusic.net

John Simon (born August 11, 1941) is an American music producer, composer, writer and performer. Recognized as one of the top record producers in the United States during the late 1960s and the 1970s, some of Simon's most well known work includes the Band’s Music from Big Pink, The Band, and The Last Waltz, Cheap Thrills by Big Brother & the Holding Company featuring Janis Joplin, Songs of Leonard Cohen by Leonard Cohen, and Child Is Father to the Man by Blood, Sweat & Tears.

== Background ==
Simon was born in Norwalk, Connecticut, United States; his father, a country doctor, taught him violin and piano at the age of four. He began writing songs before he was ten; by the time he graduated from high school Simon was already leading and writing for several bands, and had composed two original musicals. Simon enrolled at Princeton University where he wrote three more musicals and continued his role as a bandleader, taking a band to the finals of the 1st Georgetown Intercollegiate Jazz Festival.

== Columbia Records ==
After Princeton, Simon was hired as a trainee at Columbia Records. He was first assigned to the Legacy department under the guidance of Goddard Lieberson, then the president of Columbia. Simon’s work during that period involved original cast albums of Broadway shows and audio documentary albums, including Point of Order, an LP of the notorious Senate hearings conducted by anti-Communist Senator Joseph McCarthy, and The Medium Is the Massage, inspired by the writings of media guru Marshall McLuhan. In 1966, he arranged and produced "Red Rubber Ball" by the Cyrkle. The song, which was co-written by Paul Simon (no relation) of Simon and Garfunkel and Bruce Woodley of the Seekers, went to No. 2 on the Billboard Hot 100 chart. It sold over one million copies and was awarded a gold disc. Around 1970 he also co-wrote "Davy's on the Road Again" with Robbie Robertson, subsequently a British Top 10 hit in 1978 for Manfred Mann's Earth Band.

With the success of "Red Rubber Ball", Simon was assigned other pop music artists like Frankie Yankovic, "America’s Polka King", and jazzman Charles Lloyd. The first production for which he also wrote extensive arrangements was Songs of Leonard Cohen, Leonard Cohen’s debut album. While assisting on what was to become the Simon and Garfunkel album Bookends, he met Al Kooper, who encouraged him to leave Columbia and become a freelance producer, which he did, producing Blood, Sweat & Tears’ first album, Child Is Father to the Man.

== Independent ==
About that time, he was recommended to Peter Yarrow of Peter, Paul and Mary to help Yarrow with a movie he was making with cinematographer Barry Feinstein. The film was released in 1968 as You Are What You Eat and contained the song "My Name Is Jack", written by Simon for that movie, which later became a hit for Manfred Mann. Work on that film brought Simon to Woodstock, New York, where he met manager Albert Grossman. Grossman asked him to produce several acts from his stable of talent, the first being Gordon Lightfoot. Once again, Simon sweetened the project with his orchestral arrangements (Did She Mention My Name). After that, he was asked to produce an album for Janis Joplin and her band Big Brother And The Holding Company (Cheap Thrills, which featured the hit single "Piece Of My Heart"). While producing an album for the Electric Flag, he met blues artist Taj Mahal, beginning a musical association which continues to the present, as of 2023. His name is often linked with the Band, with whom he was very closely associated, and he has been referred to as "the sixth member of the Band". The albums he produced with them in the 1970s, Music From Big Pink, The Band, and The Last Waltz, stand as precursors to the genre later labeled Americana. He was also the music director for the Last Waltz concert and contributed as a musician to Stage Fright and Islands and produced, played on, and cowrote for their 1990s comeback album Jericho. Other albums of note from that period were Morning Bugle by John Hartford, Jackrabbit Slim by Steve Forbert, Heart To Heart by David Sanborn, and Priestess by the jazz arranger Gil Evans. In addition he arranged as well as produced Mama Cass's Dream a Little Dream of Me album, Tiger In The Rain for Michael Franks, and Down Home by Seals and Crofts, as well as albums for Rachel Faro, Hirth Martinez, Cyrus Faryar and others. Once popular music sprouted disco and heavy metal, he lost interest in producing and only occasionally produced new recordings, including artists popular in Japan, including Motoharu Sano, often labeled "The Japanese Bruce Springsteen".

== Other work ==
Somewhere beyond the plaintive quaver, rootsy supersession rock is mixed with pre-WW2 touches in a series of homely sketches—many of them about outsiders trying to make something of their lives, a theme to which a plaintive quaver is well-suited. Highlight: 'The Song of the Elves,' in which outsiders brag about how tall they are.

— Review of John Simon's Album in Christgau's Record Guide: Rock Albums of the Seventies (1981)

Simon composed the score for the controversial Frank Perry film, Last Summer (1969), starring Barbara Hershey and Richard Thomas. He played keyboards on the album Alone Together (1970) by Dave Mason, including the haunting piano on the song "Sad and Deep As You". In the Eighties, he wrote two ballet scores for the choreographer Twyla Tharp and composed circus music for aerialist Philip Petit (after his solo walk between the World Trade Towers). He was the music supervisor for a Broadway venture called Rock & Roll! The First 5,000 Years, modeled after Beatlemania, and produced the original cast album of The Best Little Whorehouse in Texas.

At one point, Paul Simon urged John Simon to follow his muse to be a singer-songwriter in his own right. Consequently, in the early 1970s, he recorded two albums for Warner Brothers, John Simon's Album and Journey. Then, fifteen years later, saw the first of four albums for labels in Japan, the first of which, Out On The Street, was released in the U.S. by Vanguard. Simon and his wife, C.C. Loveheart, wrote and performed a cabaret act called Alone Together For The First Time Again and, more recently, co-authored a popular play, Jackass Flats, which had its professional premiere in June 2011. A self-described "compulsive musician", Simon continues to be active. These days he performs his own material in concerts on rare occasions, but plays piano weekly with his jazz trio in his hometown near Woodstock, New York and in Melbourne, Florida in a group led by bassist, Ron Pirtle. In 2018, Simon wrote a book, Truth, Lies & Hearsay: A Memoir Of A Musical Life In And Out Of Rock And Roll which received extensive favorable reviews as an accurate, yet personal rock history, combining first-person details of iconic recording sessions with lively, chatty wit.

== Solo discography ==
Year	Album	Label	Notes
1966	The Baroque Inevitable	Columbia	Arranged & produced by John Simon. 2006 Japan re-issue credited to the Baroque Inevitable/John Simon.
1968	You Are What You Eat (Original Soundtrack Recording)	Columbia Masterworks	Various-artists soundtrack including 6 songs by John Simon
1969	Last Summer (The Original Motion Picture Soundtrack)	Warner Bros. - Seven Arts Records	Music composed by John Simon
1971	John Simon's Album	Warner Bros. Records	
1973	Journey	Warner Bros. Records	
1992	Out on the Street	Pioneer, Japan	
1995	Harmony Farm	Pioneer, Japan	
1988	Home	Pioneer, Japan	
2000	The Best and Beyond	Pioneer, Japan	Compilation culled from Pioneer Japan recordings, includes a new recording "Sometimes I Feel Like a Motherless Child" and two previously unreleased live recordings
2000	Hoagyland: Songs of Hoagy Carmichael	Dreamsville, Japan	Credited to "John Simon & Friends", incl. Steve Forbert, Jackie Cain, Terry Blaine, Geoff Muldaur and others.
2006	No Band		Solo, piano/vocal performances of new and old songs, several previously unreleased
