= Santa-Fe (Bob Dylan song) =

Song by Bob Dylan

from the album The Bootleg Series Volumes 1–3 (Rare & Unreleased) 1961–1991
- Released: March 26, 1991
- Recorded: 1967
- Genre: Folk
- Length: 2:08
- Label: Columbia
- Songwriter: Bob Dylan
- Producers: Bob Dylan; The Band

Audio sample
- file; help

"Santa-Fe" (sometimes spelled "Santa Fe" or "Santa Fé") is a song that was recorded by Bob Dylan and the Band in the summer or fall of 1967 in West Saugerties, New York. It was recorded during the sessions that would in 1975 be released on The Basement Tapes but was not included on that album. These sessions took place in three phases throughout the year, at a trio of houses, and "Santa-Fe" was likely put on tape in the second of these, at a home of some of the Band members, known as Big Pink. The composition, which has been characterized as a "nonsense" song, was copyrighted in 1973 with lyrics that differ noticeably from those on the recording itself.

In the decades following this collaboration, the over 100 tracks recorded at these sessions were at different stages obtained by collectors and released on bootlegs. The first batch of these leaked to the public beginning in the late 1960s; the second in 1986; the third, which included "Santa-Fe", in the early 1990s; and a fourth batch of Basement Tape tracks became public in 2014. The song was released officially on the Columbia album The Bootleg Series Volumes 1–3 (Rare & Unreleased) 1961–1991. It has been subject to mixed opinions by critics and biographers, with some praising it for its expressiveness, and others regarding it unmemorable, while criticizing its inclusion on The Bootleg Series at the expense of more worthy candidates.

== Background ==
=== Recording near Woodstock ===
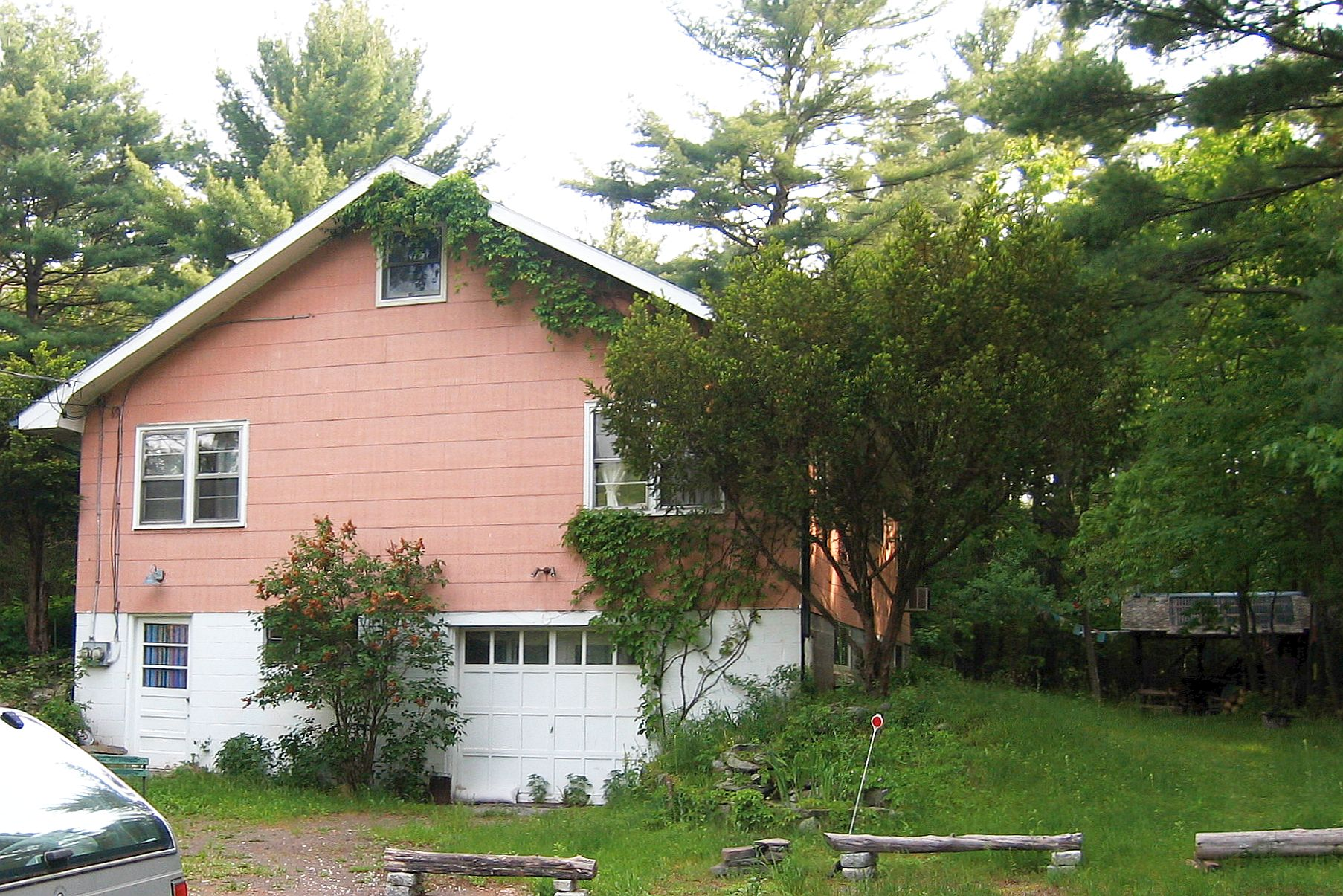
"Santa-Fe" is believed to have been recorded at Big Pink, West Saugerties, New York, shown here in 2006

In 1965 and 1966, Dylan was touring with the Hawks—Rick Danko, Garth Hudson, Richard Manuel, Robbie Robertson and Levon Helm, although Helm quit the group in late November or early December 1965. In July 1966, Dylan suffered a motorcycle accident and spent several months recuperating at his house in Byrdcliffe, near Woodstock, New York. By spring 1967, all of the members of the Hawks, except Helm, had joined Dylan in the Woodstock area, with Danko, Manuel and Hudson living in nearby West Saugerties in a house nicknamed Big Pink. Dylan and the four Hawks began recording informal music sessions, first at Dylan's house in what was known as "the Red Room", followed by the basement of Big Pink. Earlier on they recorded mostly covers and traditional music, but later moved onto original material written largely by Dylan. In total, over 100 songs and alternate takes were put on tape. Helm returned to the group in October 1967 and performed on some final Woodstock-area collaborations between Dylan and the Hawks, these ones at a different house that some group members had moved to. In the fall of that year, the Hawks, who soon renamed themselves the Band, continued writing and rehearsing songs for their debut album, Music From Big Pink.

Dylan biographer Sid Griffin has noted that, because no written records were kept of these 1967 recording sessions, "the world will have to live with the fact that it will never know exactly which Basement Tapes tune was recorded when and where". Nonetheless, using clues such as the sound quality of different batches of songs, and where they appear on the original reels of tapes, attempts have been made to place the songs into a rough chronology and guess the locations at which they were likely recorded. Biographer Clinton Heylin places "Santa-Fe" in the summer of 1967 at Big Pink. The liner notes of The Bootleg Series Volumes 1–3 date it in the fall of that year. Griffin lists it among the probable Big Pink recordings, and in a group of songs from around July, but concedes it is also "unlikely [but] possible" it came from the Red Room.

=== Circulation of Basement Tape songs ===
In late 1967, an acetate of fourteen of Dylan's compositions was made, from which demos circulated among music groups who might be interested in recording some of the songs. Artists including Peter, Paul and Mary, Manfred Mann and the Byrds eventually did. Dylan's demo tapes were soon heard by music journalists, including Rolling Stone's Jann Wenner, who wrote a front-page story in that magazine entitled "Dylan's Basement Tape Should Be Released". This made the general public hungry to hear the music, and in July 1969 a bootleg called Great White Wonder, which included some of the Big Pink songs, came out. Other Basement Tape bootlegs followed.

In 1975, the Columbia album The Basement Tapes was compiled, mainly by Robertson and engineer Rob Fraboni. Robertson and Fraboni put thirty-five of the songs onto composite reels of tape, and Heylin believes these represented a short list of candidates for the album. "Santa-Fe" was included on these composite reels, but was not ultimately chosen for the album. The Basement Tapes included sixteen Dylan songs recorded at Big Pink in 1967, as well as eight Band demos from various times and locations between 1967 and 1975. One Dylan song on the album, "Goin' to Acapulco", had not appeared on his 1967 fourteen-song acetate or on bootlegs, and this alerted the world to the possibility that there might be more Basement Tape songs in existence. In 1986, at least twenty-five previously unknown 1967 songs by Dylan and the Band passed into collectors' hands by way of a former roadie of the Band's. In the early 1990s, a third batch of songs, these ones from Garth Hudson's archives, came to light around the time Columbia was preparing The Bootleg Series Volumes 1–3; "Santa-Fe" comes from this group. In his liner notes for The Bootleg Series Volumes 1–3, John Bauldie commented on these second and third stages in which groups of Big Pink songs had come to light: "Despite the ... emergence [in 1986] in collectors' circles of a further couple of hours of Basement Tapes, it seems as though there's a good deal left unheard. 'Santa-Fe' is just one example of a batch of previously unsuspected Basement tracks". By 1992, the "Santa-Fe" batch of songs had been obtained by bootleggers, and almost all known Dylan Basement Tape songs were assembled onto the 5-CD bootleg The Genuine Basement Tapes. "Santa-Fe" was also included on the 2014 compilations The Basement Tapes Raw and The Bootleg Series Vol. 11: The Basement Tapes Complete; the latter album officially released a fourth batch of previously uncirculating Basement Tape songs.

== Personnel ==
The liner notes for The Bootleg Series Volumes 1–3 list the song's personnel as Dylan, guitar and vocals; Robertson, guitar; Hudson, organ; Manuel, piano; Danko, bass; and Helm, drums. However, Griffin argues that Helm did not arrive in Woodstock until after the song is believed to have been recorded. Furthermore, the drumming sounds to Griffin more like Manuel's style. Heylin and biographer Greil Marcus similarly do not include "Santa-Fe" among the songs they believe were recorded after Helm's arrival. Griffin also argues that no organ is audible on the track and proposes the following musician line-up as being more likely: Dylan, acoustic guitar and vocals; Robertson, electric guitar; Hudson, piano; Danko, bass; Manuel, drums.

== Copyright and lyrics ==
Different Basement Tapes songs were copyrighted in stages between 1967 and 1975, with "Santa-Fe" being registered in September 1973; still other songs from the sessions were not copyrighted until the 1980s. Researcher Tim Dunn indicates that in the original 1973 copyright the song was registered as "Santa-Fe" with a hyphen, but that some later documents relating to the renewal of the copyright omit the hyphen. The liner notes of The Bootleg Series Volumes 1–3 print the title as "Santa-Fe", while Dylan's official website, Bobdylan.com, spells it without the hyphen but with an accent on the e: "Santa Fé".

Heylin has noted that, as is the case with a number of other of Basement Tapes tracks, Dylan's copyrighted, published "Santa-Fe" lyrics differ from what can be heard on the song. Heylin speculates that the "dramatic reworking" in the later version arose from Dylan's "1973 musing in Malibu", where Dylan had moved to, and that new lines like "build a geodesic dome and sail away" and "My shrimp boat's in the bay" sound like the work of "someone sitting on the dock of the bay, not up on Meads Mountain [in Woodstock]". Heylin also notes that the website maintained by Olof Björner, Words Fill My Head, contains a transcription of the song as Dylan performed it. The 1973 copyrighted lyrics are printed on Bobdylan.com.

In his notes for The Bootleg Series Volumes 1–3, Bauldie describes the song as "a typical combination of nonsense and fun, just for the hell of it, really ..."; author Oliver Trager likewise describes it as a "nonsense" song. Heylin writes that the lyrics "revolve around 'dear, dear, dear, dear, Santa Fe'—intended to be both a woman's name and the town in New Mexico. After five verses of rolling said words around, he moves on."

== Appraisal ==
Opinions about the song have been mixed. AllMusic critic Thomas Ward calls it "one of the great good-time songs in Dylan's canon". Ward comments that "Dylan sings it as if he is having the time of his life", adding that "rarely has he sung with such expressiveness". Anthony Varesi, author of The Bob Dylan Albums, similarly praises the song's "breadth of feeling" and "unparalleled expressiveness", noting that "it appears Dylan simply improvised the song on the spot, and the passion within him allows the song to flow forth naturally". Biographer John Nagowski has described the song as "delightful", while a New York Times review rates it one of the highlights of Volume 2 of The Bootleg Series Volumes 1–3, commenting that it is one of only a couple of mid-60s songs on the compilation that "live up to their vintage". Griffin describes it as "catchy but slight" and "a slight if charming little ditty", but criticizes the decision to include it on The Bootleg Series Volumes 1–3 rather than the "masterpiece" composition "Sign on the Cross". Heylin concurs, characterizing "Santa-Fe" in 1995 as a "pleasant enough throwaway" but suggesting that "Sign on the Cross" or another 1967 composition, "I'm Not There", would have been much better choices ("I'm Not There" was eventually released in 2007 on the I'm Not There soundtrack, and both it and "Sign on the Cross" were included on The Basement Tapes Raw and The Basement Tapes Complete in 2014). By 2009, Heylin's opinion had changed little and he writes that "of all the 'missing' basement-tape originals that appear on that three-CD set, 'Santa Fe' hardly represented an A-list candidate. Just another discarded ditty, it relies on the usual wordplay and slurred diction to obscure any pretense to a deeper meaning". Marcus dismisses it as no more than "a riff", while a review in Stereophile magazine calls it "the most lightweight tune on all three CDs, with indecipherable lyrics". Author Peter James, referring to Dylan and the Band's Woodstock output, writes that "many great songs were written and recorded in [Big Pink's] basement in 1967, unfortunately 'Santa-Fe' is not one of them." He goes on to describe the song's inclusion on The Bootleg Series Volumes 1–3 as "little more than a joke".

== Cover versions ==
The song has been covered by Howard Fishman on his album Performs Bob Dylan & The Band's The Basement Tapes Live at Joe's Pub. Fishman played more than sixty songs from Dylan and the Band's Basement Tapes sessions over three nights, of which selected tracks were included on the CD and an accompanying DVD. "Santa-Fe" has also been covered by Steve Gibbons. On November 7, 2007, at the Beacon Theatre in New York City, J Mascis and the Million Dollar Bashers performed the song at a special concert featuring numerous music artists celebrating the release of Todd Haynes's film I'm Not There. Thomas Ward notes that Dylan himself has never played the song live.
