= Big Pink =

House associated with Bob Dylan in Upstate NY, US

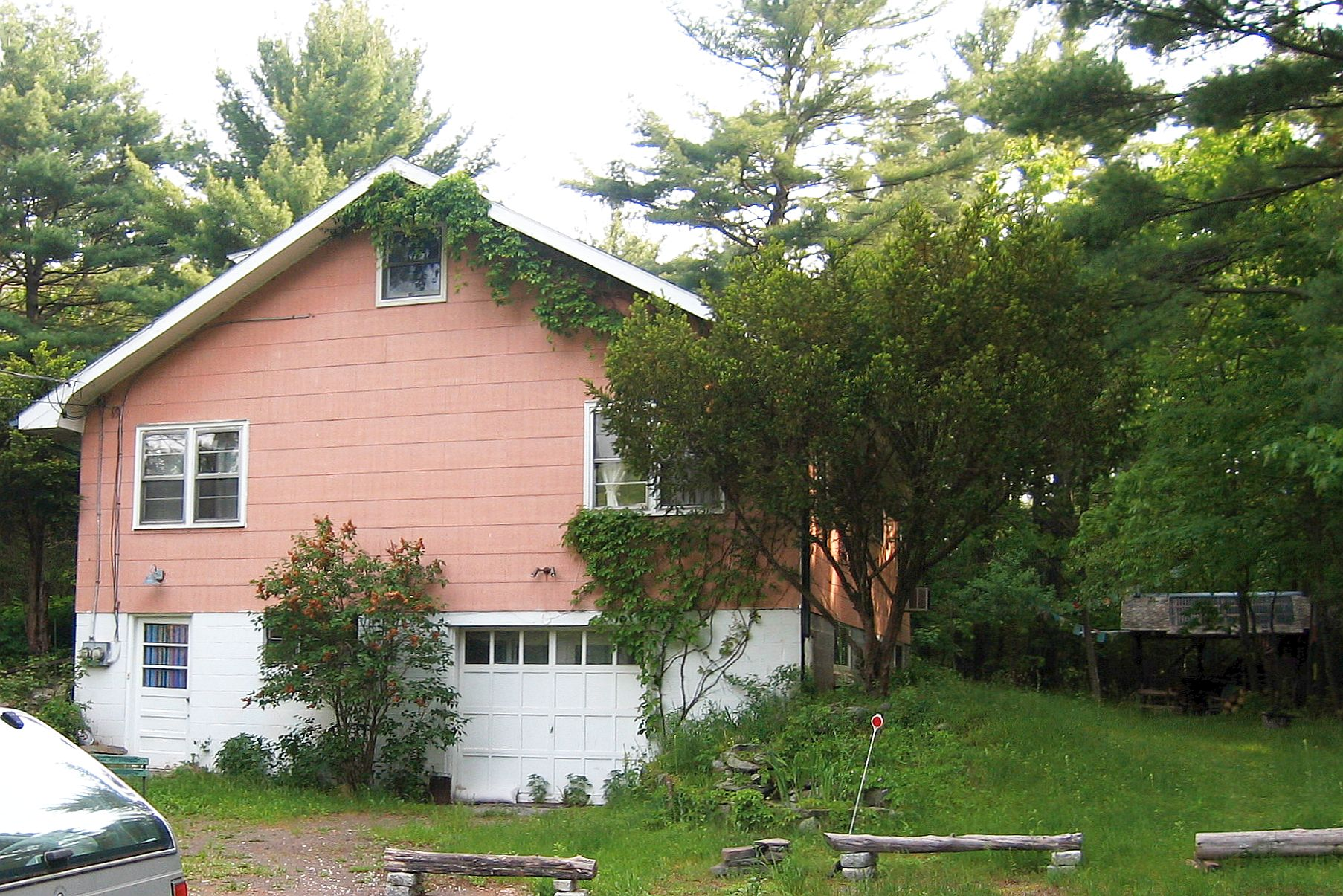
- Big Pink in 2006

- Location in New York State
- Alternative names: The Big Pink

General information
- Status: Completed
- Type: House
- Location: 56 Parnassus Lane, Saugerties, New York, United States
- Coordinates: 42.0778°N 74.0513°W
- Estimated completion: 1967

Design and construction
- Known for: Recording of The Basement Tapes, writing of Music from Big Pink

Big Pink is a house in West Saugerties, New York, which was the location where Bob Dylan and the Band recorded The Basement Tapes, and the Band wrote parts of their album Music from Big Pink.

== The house ==
The house is located at 56 Parnassus Lane (formerly 2188 Stoll Road). The house was built by Ottmar Gramms, who bought the land in 1952.

The house was newly built when Rick Danko, then part of Bob Dylan's backing band, found it as a rental in 1967, after the cancellation of Dylan's tour due to his 1966 motorcycle crash. Dylan was living at the time in nearby Woodstock. Danko moved into the house along with bandmates Garth Hudson and Richard Manuel in February 1967. The house became known locally as "Big Pink" for its pink siding.

== The Basement Tapes ==
In early 1967, Bob Dylan and the musicians who would later become the Band began to record together, initially in the "Red Room" at Dylan's house, Hi Lo Ha, in the Byrdcliffe area of Woodstock.

In June, these sessions moved to the basement of Big Pink, where Hudson set up a recording space using two stereo mixers and a tape recorder borrowed from Dylan's manager Albert Grossman, as well as a set of microphones on loan from folk trio Peter, Paul and Mary.

During June-October 1967, Dylan and the Band recorded a huge number of cover songs and original Dylan material in the basement. In the process, the Band began to develop their distinctive sound for the first time. These sessions ended in October 1967, with Levon Helm having rejoined the group by that time.

The recordings were not commercially released at the time, but attracted attention through a demo circulated amongst recording artists by Dylan's publishing company Dwarf Music, and through bootlegs such as Great White Wonder. Several songs from the sessions were taken up by other performers, starting with Peter, Paul and Mary's cover of "Too Much of Nothing" which reached number 35 on the Billboard chart in late 1967.

Some of the basement recordings were eventually officially released in 1975, as The Basement Tapes, while the full set of recordings was released in 2014 as The Bootleg Series Vol. 11: The Basement Tapes Complete.

== Music from Big Pink ==
After the conclusion of the sessions with Dylan, the Band began writing their own songs at Big Pink. They still had no official name, and in 1969, Rolling Stone referred to them as "the band from Big Pink."

These songs became their first album, Music from Big Pink (1968). The album included three songs written or co-written by Dylan ("This Wheel's on Fire", "Tears of Rage", and "I Shall Be Released") as well as "The Weight", the use of which in the film Easy Rider would make it probably their best-known song.

The album features a photograph of Big Pink on its back cover, along with a description written by Canadian journalist Dominique Bourgeois, who went on to marry Robertson.

A pink house seated in the sun of Overlook Mountain in West Saugerties, New York. Big Pink bore this music and these songs along its way. It's the first witness of this album that's been thought and composed right there inside its walls.

— Dominique Bourgeois, Music from Big Pink album cover

== Later legacy ==
The house was subsequently sold by Gramms in 1977. It was rented to classical music label Parnassus Records, which used it as its headquarters, before becoming a private residence in 1998. As of 2017, the house is used as a vacation rental property, with publicity featuring its role in music history.

A painting of Big Pink was used as the cover of the Band's 1993 album Jericho.
