= The Basement Tapes (disambiguation) =

The Basement Tapes is a 1975 studio album by Bob Dylan and the Band.

The Basement Tapes may also refer to:

- The Bootleg Series Vol. 11: The Basement Tapes Complete, a 2014 compilation album by Bob Dylan and the Band
- The recordings made by Bob Dylan and the Band in 1967, see: List of Basement Tapes songs
- The videotapes made by the Columbine shooters, see: Eric Harris and Dylan Klebold § Journals and investigation

== See also ==
- The New Basement Tapes, a British-American supergroup
