= The Bootleg Series Vol. 11: The Basement Tapes Complete =

Compilation album by Bob Dylan and the Band
- Released: November 4, 2014
- Recorded: June–October 1967
- Studios: "Big Pink", West Saugerties, New York
- Genres: Folk; roots rock
- Length: 393:49
- Label: Columbia

Bob Dylan chronology
The 50th Anniversary Collection 1963 (2014)	The Bootleg Series Vol. 11: The Basement Tapes Complete (2014)	The 50th Anniversary Collection 1964 (2014)

The Band chronology
Live at the Academy of Music 1971 (2013)	The Bootleg Series Vol. 11: The Basement Tapes Complete (2014)

Bob Dylan Bootleg Series chronology
Vol. 10: Another Self Portrait (1969–1971) (2013)	Vol. 11: The Basement Tapes Complete (2014)	Vol. 12: The Cutting Edge 1965–1966 (2015)

The Bootleg Series Vol. 11: The Basement Tapes Complete is a compilation album of unreleased home recordings made in 1967 by Bob Dylan and the group of musicians that would become the Band, released on November 3, 2014, on Legacy Records. It is the ninth installment of the Bob Dylan Bootleg Series, available as a six-disc complete set, and as a separate set of highlights – in a two-disc format common to the rest of the series – entitled The Basement Tapes Raw.

Revered for decades as the "holy grail" for music collectors and Dylan fans, the recordings have been notoriously bootlegged by collectors in various forms throughout the years, some of which were included on what is arguably the first rock bootleg album ever, Great White Wonder, released in July 1969. The Basement Tapes Complete is the first time the complete sessions, containing 138 tracks of which 117 were not previously issued, have been officially released. Of these tracks 23 are alternate takes, making 115 distinct songs in the set, of which some are heard in two or three different takes. The Basement Tapes Complete was universally acclaimed upon release by critics and fans alike, and went on to win Best Historical Album at the 58th Annual Grammy Awards.

The liner notes for The Bootleg Series Vol. 11 are by Sid Griffin, American musician and author of Million Dollar Bash: Bob Dylan, The Band, and The Basement Tapes.

== History of recordings ==
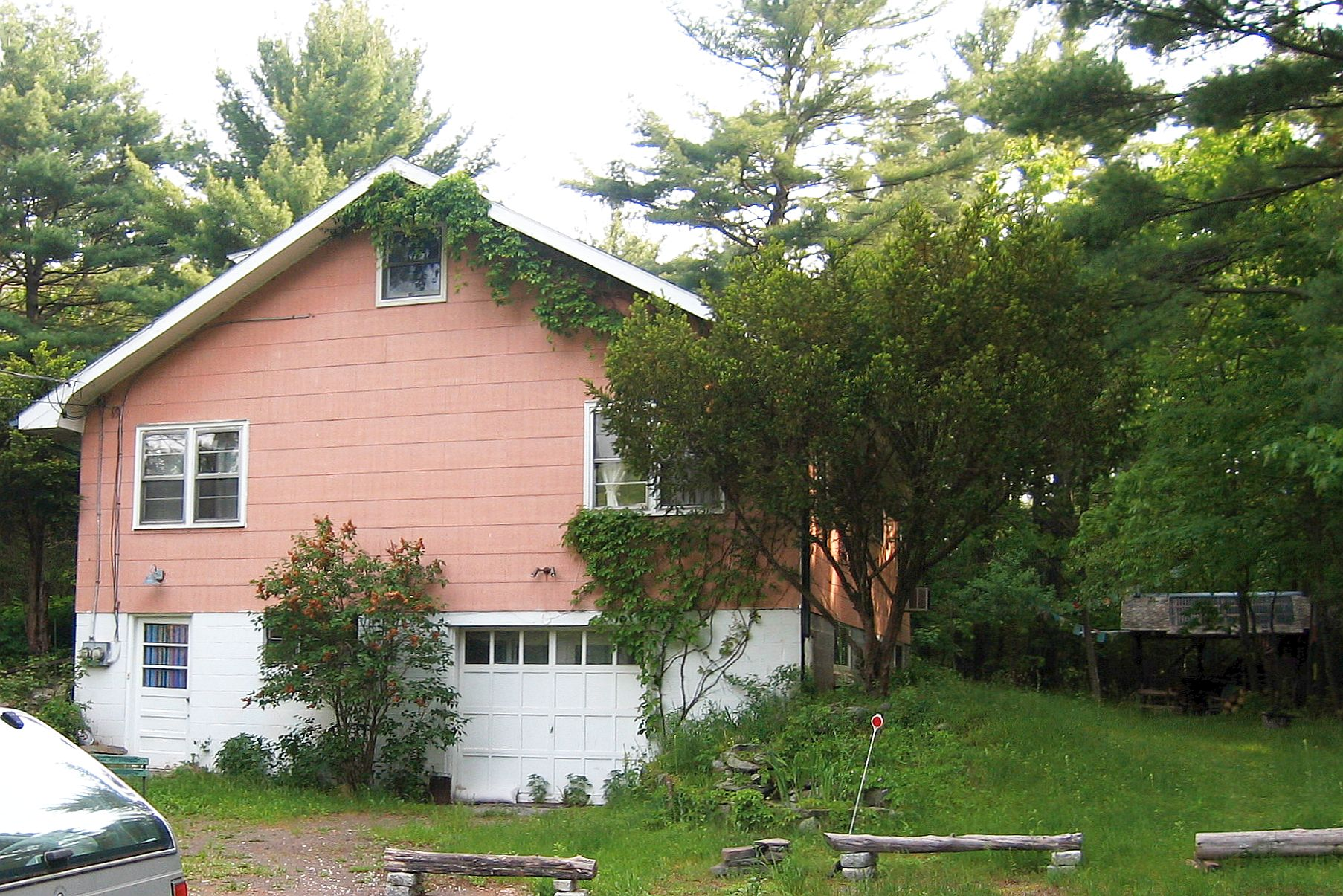
"Big Pink", location of the recording sessions for The Basement Tapes

The basement recordings were made during 1967, after Dylan had withdrawn to his Woodstock home in the aftermath of a motorcycle accident on July 29, 1966. Recording sessions began in a den known as "The Red Room" in Dylan's home, before moving to an improvised recording studio in the basement of a house known as Big Pink, where Rick Danko, Richard Manuel and Garth Hudson lived. The sessions lasted roughly from May to October 1967. In October 1967, a fourteen-song demo tape was copyrighted and the compositions were registered with Dwarf Music, a publishing company jointly owned by Dylan and his manager Albert Grossman. Acetates and tapes of the songs then circulated among interested recording artists. (Note: The songs on the demo were: "Million Dollar Bash", "Yea! Heavy and a Bottle of Bread", "Please Mrs. Henry", "Down in the Flood", "Lo and Behold", "Tiny Montgomery", "This Wheel's on Fire", "You Ain't Goin' Nowhere", "I Shall Be Released", "Tears of Rage", "Too Much of Nothing", "The Mighty Quinn", "Open the Door, Homer" and "Nothing Was Delivered" (Griffin 2007, pp. 229–230).) Dylan has referred to commercial pressures behind the basement recordings in a 1969 interview with Rolling Stone: "They weren't demos for myself, they were demos of the songs. I was being PUSHED again into coming up with some songs. You know how those things go."

Peter, Paul and Mary had the first hit with a basement composition when their cover of "Too Much of Nothing" reached number 35 on the Billboard chart in late 1967. Ian & Sylvia, also managed by Grossman, recorded "Tears of Rage", "Quinn the Eskimo" and "This Wheel's on Fire". In January 1968, Manfred Mann reached number one on the UK singles chart with their recording of "The Mighty Quinn". In April, "This Wheel's on Fire", recorded by Julie Driscoll, Brian Auger and the Trinity, hit number five on the UK chart. That same month, a version of "You Ain't Goin' Nowhere" by the Byrds was issued as a single. Along with "Nothing Was Delivered", it appeared on their country-rock album Sweetheart of the Rodeo, released in August. The Hawks, officially renamed the Band, (Note: When Albert Grossman was shopping around for a recording contract for the Hawks in late 1967, the group instructed him to sign them under the name the Crackers—a derogatory term for poor white Southerners. The band also mischievously dubbed themselves the Honkies. It was only when Helm joined them in Woodstock that they settled on calling themselves the Band (Hoskyns 1993, pp. 143–144).) recorded "This Wheel's on Fire", "I Shall Be Released" and "Tears of Rage" for their debut album, Music from Big Pink, released in July 1968. Fairport Convention covered "Million Dollar Bash" on their 1969 album Unhalfbricking.

In July 1969, the first rock bootleg appeared in California, entitled Great White Wonder. The double album consisted of seven songs from the Woodstock basement sessions, plus some early recordings Dylan had made in Minneapolis in December 1961 and one track recorded from The Johnny Cash Show. One of those responsible for the bootleg, identified only as Patrick, talked to Rolling Stone: "Dylan is a heavy talent and he's got all those songs nobody's ever heard. We thought we'd take it upon ourselves to make this music available." The process of bootlegging Dylan's work would eventually see the illegal release of hundreds of live and studio recordings, and lead the Recording Industry Association of America to describe Dylan as the most bootlegged artist in the history of the music industry.

The basement recordings became the basis for Dylan's 1975 official release The Basement Tapes. This album was criticised by Dylan critic Michael Gray, among others, because it contained recordings by the Band on their own, and because important Dylan songs were omitted from the selection. Subsequent to the official 1975 release, more than 100 recordings from the Basement Tapes began to circulate in bootleg form, catalogued by Greil Marcus in his book Invisible Republic: Bob Dylan's Basement Tapes (1997), and by Sid Griffin in Million Dollar Bash: Bob Dylan, the Band, and the Basement Tapes (2007).

The Bootleg Series Vol. 11: The Basement Tapes Complete presents the original recordings, and places them in roughly chronological order. The original reel-to-reel tapes were in the possession of Garth Hudson, organist for the Hawks. He brought them to fellow Canadians Jan Haust and Peter J. Moore, who restored and digitized them for this release. Their work led them to win the 2016 Grammy award for Best Historical Album.

== Reception ==
Professional ratings
Aggregate scores
Source	Rating
Metacritic	99/100
Review scores
Source	Rating
AllMusic	5/5 stars
American Songwriter	5/5 stars
Austin Chronicle	5/5 stars
Blurt	5/5 stars
Consequence of Sound	A
The Guardian	5/5 stars
Mojo	5/5 stars
Paste	10.0/10
Rolling Stone	5/5 stars
Under the Radar	10/10 stars

The Bootleg Series Vol. 11: The Basement Tapes Complete received unanimously positive reviews from critics. The critical aggregator website Metacritic awarded The Basement Tapes Complete a Metascore of 99, based on reviews by 18 critics, indicating "universal acclaim".

Writing for AllMusic, Stephen Thomas Erlewine gave it five out of five stars, writing, "This is the wondrous thing about The Basement Tapes: this is music made with no expectation that anybody outside of a small circle would ever hear it." Paste magazine rated the album ten out of ten, and called it "some of the most daring, creative and truly beautiful music ever recorded".

In his review for American Songwriter, Jim Beviglia gave it five out of five stars and wrote:

Music fans having access to the complete archives of The Basement Tapes is somewhat akin to historians being presented with the tapes of the meetings of the Continental Congress or art buffs who receive a videotape of Da Vinci's entire process of painting The Last Supper."

Discussing the song "I'm Not There", Jesse Jarnow said that "Here and everywhere, underscored by the newest remix, The Basement Tapes are almost purely beautiful — a characteristic not often associated with Dylan’s music."

Not all critics, however, were entirely pleased with the overwhelming completeness of the album, and considered a large amount of the album consisted of throwaway songs that were never meant to be heard. In his review for The New Yorker magazine, Sasha Frere-Jones wrote, "Historically, these sessions have been treated with awe, as if something essential about both Dylan and popular song can be found on the tapes. That's at best half true. The performances weren't approached with any kind of gravity, and are best listened to with no reverence at all. For every moment of revelation and synthesis, there are five throwaways."

== Track listing ==
=== The Basement Tapes Complete ===
All tracks are written by Bob Dylan, except where noted; traditional songs arranged by Dylan.

Disc one
No.	Title	Writer(s)	Length
1.	"Edge of the Ocean"		2:21
2.	"My Bucket's Got a Hole in It"	Clarence Williams	1:35
3.	"Roll on Train"		2:00
4.	"Mr. Blue"	DeWayne Blackwell	1:52
5.	"Belshazzar"	Johnny Cash	3:22
6.	"I Forgot to Remember to Forget"	Charlie Feathers, Stanley Kesler	3:19
7.	"You Win Again"	Hank Williams	2:43
8.	"Still in Town"	Hank Cochran, Harlan Howard	3:04
9.	"Waltzing with Sin"	Sonny Burns, Red Hayes	2:49
10.	"Big River" (Take 1)	Cash	0:43
11.	"Big River" (Take 2)	Cash	2:23
12.	"Folsom Prison Blues" ( (Note: Included on The Basement Tapes Raw.))	Cash	2:46
13.	"Bells of Rhymney"	Idris Davies, Peter Seeger	3:16
14.	"Spanish Is the Loving Tongue"	Charles Badger Clark, Bill Simon	3:53
15.	"Under Control"		2:50
16.	"Ol' Roison the Beau"	Traditional	4:55
17.	"I'm Guilty of Loving You"	Jerry Butler, Billy Butler (misattributed to Dylan)	1:09
18.	"Cool Water"	Bob Nolan	3:04
19.	"The Auld Triangle"	Dick Shannon (misattributed to Brendan Behan)	5:47
20.	"Po' Lazarus"	Traditional	1:00
21.	"I'm a Fool for You" (Take 1)		1:06
22.	"I'm a Fool for You" (Take 2)		2:34
Total length:			58:31

Disc two
No.	Title	Writer(s)	Length
1.	"Johnny Todd"	Traditional	2:05
2.	"Tupelo"	John Lee Hooker	2:22
3.	"Kickin' My Dog Around"	Traditional	2:43
4.	"See You Later Allen Ginsberg" (Take 1)		0:30
5.	"See You Later Allen Ginsberg" (Take 2)		0:51
6.	"Tiny Montgomery" ( (Note: Originally released in 1975 on The Basement Tapes.))		2:57
7.	"Big Dog"		0:24
8.	"I'm Your Teenage Prayer"		3:52
9.	"Four Strong Winds"	Ian Tyson	3:42
10.	"The French Girl" (Take 1)	Tyson, Sylvia Tyson	2:12
11.	"The French Girl" (Take 2)	Tyson, Tyson	3:00
12.	"Joshua Gone Barbados"	Eric Von Schmidt	2:46
13.	"I'm in the Mood"	Bernard Besman, Hooker	1:58
14.	"Baby Ain't That Fine"	Dallas Frazier	2:11
15.	"Rock, Salt and Nails"	Bruce Phillips	4:37
16.	"A Fool Such As I"	William Marvin Trader	2:57
17.	"Song for Canada"	Peter Gzowski, Tyson	4:31
18.	"People Get Ready"	Curtis Mayfield	3:15
19.	"I Don't Hurt Anymore"	Donald Robertson, Walter Rollins	2:15
20.	"Be Careful of Stones That You Throw"	Benjamin Lee Blankenship (Note: The attribution of "Be Careful of Stones That You Throw" to Benjamin Lee Blankenship has been questioned. (Fraser, Alan. ""Searching For A Gem": The Bootleg Series Vol. 11 – The Basement Tapes Raw/Complete".) Both Sid Griffin's Million Dollar Bash: Bob Dylan, The Band, and the Basement Tapes (Griffin 2007, p. 130) and Derek Barker's The Songs He Didn't Write: Bob Dylan Under The Influence (Barker 2008, p. 33) write the song was written by Bonnie Dodd; it was first released by Little Jimmy Dickens in 1949, and was a hit for Hank Williams, performing as Luke The Drifter, in 1952.)	3:04
21.	"One Man's Loss"		3:52
22.	"Lock Your Door"		0:23
23.	"Baby, Won't You Be My Baby"		2:53
24.	"Try Me Little Girl"		1:38
25.	"I Can't Make It Alone"		3:34
26.	"Don't You Try Me Now"		3:12
Total length:			67:44

Disc three
No.	Title	Writer(s)	Length
1.	"Young but Daily Growing"	Traditional	5:40
2.	"Bonnie Ship the Diamond"	Traditional	3:21
3.	"The Hills of Mexico"	Traditional	3:05
4.	"Down on Me"	Traditional	0:43
5.	"One for the Road"		4:50
6.	"I'm Alright"		1:46
7.	"Million Dollar Bash" (Take 1)		2:52
8.	"Million Dollar Bash" (Take 2)		2:35
9.	"Yea! Heavy and a Bottle of Bread" (Take 1)		1:50
10.	"Yea! Heavy and a Bottle of Bread" (Take 2)		2:16
11.	"I'm Not There" ( (Note: Originally released in 2007 on I'm Not There.))		5:13
12.	"Please Mrs. Henry"		2:34
13.	"Crash on the Levee (Down in the Flood)" (Take 1)		2:11
14.	"Crash on the Levee (Down in the Flood)" (Take 2)		2:06
15.	"Lo and Behold!" (Take 1)		2:54
16.	"Lo and Behold!" (Take 2)		2:50
17.	"You Ain't Goin' Nowhere" (Take 1)		2:48
18.	"You Ain't Goin' Nowhere" (Take 2 (Note: Originally released with overdubs in 1975 on The Basement Tapes.))		2:46
19.	"I Shall Be Released" (Take 1)		4:04
20.	"I Shall Be Released" (Take 2 (Note: Originally released in 1991 on The Bootleg Series Vol. 1–3.))		3:58
21.	"This Wheel's on Fire"	Dylan, Rick Danko	3:54
22.	"Too Much of Nothing" (Take 1)		3:03
23.	"Too Much of Nothing" (Take 2)		2:51
Total length:			70:10

Disc four
No.	Title	Writer(s)	Length
1.	"Tears of Rage" (Take 1)	Dylan, Richard Manuel	4:04
2.	"Tears of Rage" (Take 2)	Dylan, Manuel	2:31
3.	"Tears of Rage" (Take 3)	Dylan, Manuel	4:15
4.	"Quinn the Eskimo" (Take 1)		2:03
5.	"Quinn the Eskimo" (Take 2 (Note: Originally released in 1985 on Biograph.))		2:16
6.	"Open the Door Homer" (Take 1)		2:53
7.	"Open the Door Homer" (Take 2)		0:58
8.	"Open the Door Homer" (Take 3)		3:14
9.	"Nothing Was Delivered" (Take 1)		4:26
10.	"Nothing Was Delivered" (Take 2)		3:44
11.	"Nothing Was Delivered" (Take 3)		0:33
12.	"All American Boy"	Bobby Bare	3:59
13.	"Sign on the Cross"		7:21
14.	"Odds and Ends" (Take 1)		1:48
15.	"Odds and Ends" (Take 2)		1:49
16.	"Get Your Rocks Off"		3:46
17.	"Clothes Line Saga (Answer to Ode)"		2:59
18.	"Apple Suckling Tree" (Take 1)		2:41
19.	"Apple Suckling Tree" (Take 2)		2:50
20.	"Don't Ya Tell Henry"		2:31
21.	"Bourbon Street"		5:05
Total length:			65:46

Disc five
No.	Title	Writer(s)	Length
1.	"Blowin' in the Wind"		6:36
2.	"One Too Many Mornings"		3:23
3.	"A Satisfied Mind"	Red Hayes, Jack Rhodes	2:01
4.	"It Ain't Me, Babe"		3:32
5.	"Ain't No More Cane" (Take 1)	Traditional	2:41
6.	"Ain't No More Cane" (Take 2)	Traditional	1:58
7.	"My Woman She's A-Leavin'"		2:30
8.	"Santa-Fe"		2:08
9.	"Mary Lou, I Love You Too"		2:30
10.	"Dress It Up, Better Have It All"		2:53
11.	"Minstrel Boy" ( (Note: Originally released in 2013 on The Bootleg Series Vol. 10.))		1:40
12.	"Silent Weekend"		3:01
13.	"What's It Gonna Be When It Comes Up"		3:04
14.	"900 Miles from My Home"	Traditional	2:14
15.	"Wildwood Flower"	A. P. Carter	2:11
16.	"One Kind Favor" (Often credited elsewhere as See That My Grave Is Kept Clean)	Traditional	3:33
17.	"She'll Be Coming 'Round the Mountain"	Traditional	1:39
18.	"It's the Flight of the Bumblebee"		2:09
19.	"Wild Wolf"		3:35
20.	"Goin' to Acapulco"		5:37
21.	"Gonna Get You Now"		1:31
22.	"If I Were a Carpenter"	James Timothy Hardin	2:23
23.	"Confidential"	Dorinda Morgan	1:37
24.	"All You Have to Do Is Dream" (Take 1)		3:56
25.	"All You Have to Do Is Dream" (Take 2)		3:20
Total length:			71:42

Disc six (Bonus Disc)
No.	Title	Writer(s)	Length
1.	"2 Dollars and 99 Cents"		2:35
2.	"Jelly Bean"		2:58
3.	"Any Time"		3:17
4.	"Down by the Station"		1:29
5.	"Hallelujah, I've Just Been Moved"	Traditional	3:04
6.	"That's the Breaks"		4:18
7.	"Pretty Mary"		3:12
8.	"Will the Circle Be Unbroken?"	Carter	2:09
9.	"King of France"		3:53
10.	"She's on My Mind Again"		4:18
11.	"Goin' Down the Road Feeling Bad"	Traditional	3:21
12.	"On a Rainy Afternoon"		2:53
13.	"I Can't Come in with a Broken Heart"		2:42
14.	"Next Time on the Highway"		2:20
15.	"Northern Claim"		2:05
16.	"Love Is Only Mine"		1:50
17.	"Silhouettes"	Bob Crewe, Frank Slay Jr.	1:52
18.	"Bring It On Home"		3:07
19.	"Come All Ye Fair and Tender Ladies"	Traditional	2:09
20.	"The Spanish Song" (Take 1)		2:47
21.	"The Spanish Song" (Take 2)		2:16
22.	"900 Miles from My Home/Confidential" (Hidden track)	Traditional/Dorinda Morgan	2:27
Total length:			61:02

=== The Basement Tapes Raw ===
Disc one
No.	Title	Writer(s)	Length
1.	"Open the Door, Homer" (Restored version)		2:52
2.	"Odds and Ends" (Alternate version)		1:48
3.	"Million Dollar Bash" (Alternate version)		2:52
4.	"One Too Many Mornings" (Unreleased)		3:23
5.	"I Don't Hurt Anymore" (Unreleased)	Robertson, Rollins	2:15
6.	"Ain't No More Cane" (Alternate version)	Traditional	1:57
7.	"Crash on the Levee" (Restored version)		2:05
8.	"Tears of Rage" (Without overdubs)	Dylan, Manuel	4:14
9.	"Dress It Up, Better Have It All" (Unreleased)		2:52
10.	"I'm Not There" (Previously released)		5:12
11.	"Johnny Todd" (Unreleased)	Traditional	2:04
12.	"Too Much of Nothing" (Alternate version)		2:52
13.	"Quinn the Eskimo" (Restored version)		2:16
14.	"Get Your Rocks Off" (Unreleased)		3:46
15.	"Santa-Fe" (Previously released)		2:08
16.	"Silent Weekend" (Unreleased)		3:00
17.	"Clothes Line Saga" (Restored version)		2:59
18.	"Please, Mrs. Henry" (Restored version)		2:34
19.	"I Shall Be Released" (Restored version)		3:55
Total length:			54:54

Disc two
No.	Title	Writer(s)	Length
1.	"You Ain't Goin' Nowhere" (Alternate version)		2:48
2.	"Lo and Behold!" (Alternate version)		2:53
3.	"Minstrel Boy" (Previously released)		1:39
4.	"Tiny Montgomery" (Without overdubs)		2:56
5.	"All You Have to Do Is Dream" (Unreleased)		3:23
6.	"Goin' to Acapulco" (Without overdubs)		5:36
7.	"900 Miles from My Home" (Unreleased)	Traditional	2:13
8.	"One for the Road" (Unreleased)		4:49
9.	"I'm Alright" (Unreleased)		1:45
10.	"Blowin' in the Wind" (Unreleased)		6:35
11.	"Apple Suckling Tree" (Restored version)		2:50
12.	"Nothing Was Delivered" (Restored version)		4:26
13.	"Folsom Prison Blues" (Unreleased)	Cash	2:46
14.	"This Wheel's on Fire" (Without overdubs)	Dylan, Danko	3:54
15.	"Yea! Heavy and a Bottle of Bread" (Restored version)		2:16
16.	"Don't Ya Tell Henry" (Alternate version)		2:30
17.	"Baby, Won't You Be My Baby" (Unreleased)		2:52
18.	"Sign on the Cross" (Unreleased)		7:21
19.	"You Ain't Goin' Nowhere" (Without overdubs)		2:43
Total length:			66:15

== Personnel ==
- Bob Dylan – acoustic guitar, harmonica, piano, vocals
- Rick Danko – bass guitar, vocals
- Garth Hudson – organ
- Richard Manuel – piano, drums, vocals
- Robbie Robertson – electric guitar, drums, vocals
- Levon Helm – drums, vocals (select tracks, unknown)

== Charts ==
Chart (2014)	Peak position
Australian Albums (ARIA)	29
Austrian Albums (Ö3 Austria)	6
Belgian Albums (Ultratop Flanders)	15
Belgian Albums (Ultratop Wallonia)	57
Danish Albums (Hitlisten)	10
German Albums (Offizielle Top 100)	9
Italian Albums (FIMI)	30
Spanish Albums (Promusicae)	35
Swiss Albums (Schweizer Hitparade)	12
UK Albums (Official Charts)	17
US Billboard 200	41

== See also ==
- Lost on the River: The New Basement Tapes
- List of Basement Tapes songs
