= Quinn the Eskimo (Mighty Quinn) =

Song by Bob Dylan

"Mighty Quinn"

Single by Manfred Mann

from the album Mighty Garvey! (UK) The Mighty Quinn (US)
- B-side: "By Request – Edwin Garvey"
- Released: 8 January 1968
- Recorded: 2 November – December 1967
- Genre: Folk rock; Pop rock
- Length: 2:51
- Label: Fontana (UK); Mercury (US)
- Songwriter: Bob Dylan
- Producer: Mike Hurst

Manfred Mann singles chronology
"So Long, Dad" (1967)	"Mighty Quinn" (1968)	"Theme from 'Up the Junction'" (1968)

Official video
- "Mighty Quinn (Quinn The Eskimo)" from TopPop on YouTube

"The Mighty Quinn (Quinn the Eskimo)"

Song by Bob Dylan

from the album Self Portrait
- Released: 8 June 1970
- Recorded: 31 August 1969
- Venue: Isle of Wight Festival, Wootton Creek
- Genre: Folk rock
- Length: 2:48
- Label: Columbia
- Songwriter: Bob Dylan
- Producer: Bob Johnston

"Quinn the Eskimo (The Mighty Quinn)" (or "The Mighty Quinn (Quinn the Eskimo)") is a folk-rock song written and first recorded by Bob Dylan in 1967 during The Basement Tapes sessions. The song's first release was in January 1968 as "Mighty Quinn" in a version by the British band Manfred Mann, which became a great success. It has been recorded by a number of performers, often under the "Mighty Quinn" title.

The subject of the song is the arrival of Quinn (an Eskimo), who prefers a more relaxed lifestyle ("jumping queues and making haste just ain't my cup of meat") and refuses hard work ("Just tell me where to put 'em and I'll tell you who to call"), but brings joy to the people.

Dylan is widely believed to have derived the title character from actor Anthony Quinn's role as an Eskimo in the 1960 movie The Savage Innocents. Dylan has also been quoted as saying that the song was nothing more than a "simple nursery rhyme". A 2004 Chicago Tribune article said the song was named after Gordon Quinn, co-founder of Kartemquin Films, who had given Dylan and Howard Alk uncredited editing assistance on Eat the Document (1966).

== Manfred Mann and Dylan versions ==
=== Original 1968 single ===
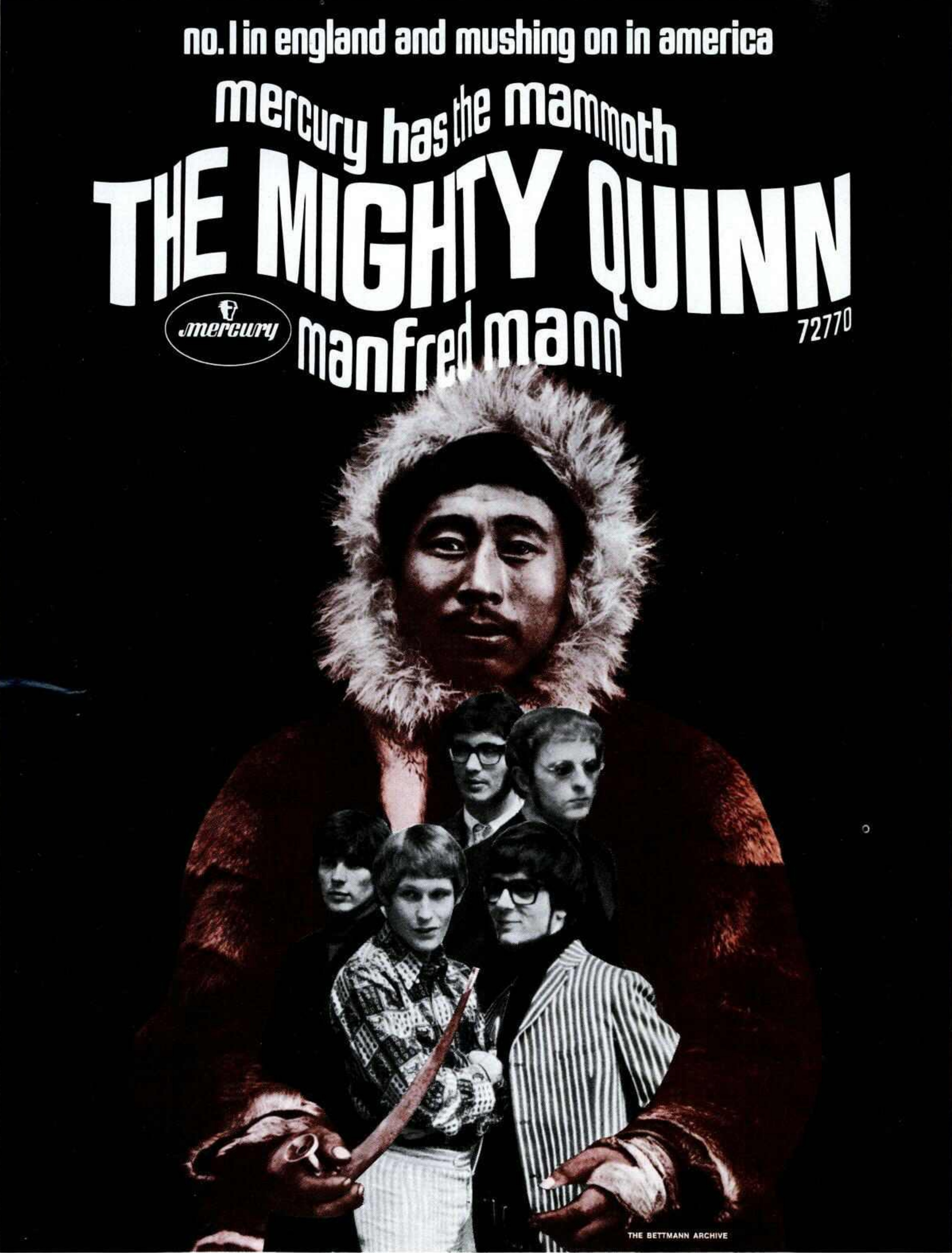
Billboard advertisement, February 24, 1968

Dylan first recorded the song in 1967 during the Basement Tapes sessions, but did not release a version for another three years. Meanwhile, the song was picked up and recorded in December 1967 by the British band Manfred Mann, who released it as a single in the US on 8 January 1968 under the title "Mighty Quinn". A UK single followed within a week. The Manfred Mann version reached No. 1 on the UK Singles Chart for the week of 14 February 1968, and remained there the following week. It also charted on the American Billboard Hot 100 chart, peaking at No. 10, and reached No. 4 in Cash Box. Cash Box called it a "funky-rock track" with "a trace of calypso [to] add zest to a tremendous effort."

=== Earth Band versions and 1978 single ===
Later groups to feature the eponymous keyboardist, Manfred Mann Chapter Three and Manfred Mann's Earth Band, played a dramatically different version of the song live. A live recording of part of the instrumental midsection was released on the 1975 Earth Band album Nightingales & Bombers under the title "As Above So Below". The band finally released a live version of the entire song on their 1978 album Watch. The single edit, released to commemorate ten years since the release of the 1968 Manfred Mann hit version, omitted the prog middle part and included a few new guitar solos. Since that time, the song has appeared on numerous live recordings, the middle part often including long solos and/or snippets of other songs. On the album Mann Alive, the "As Above So Below" middle part has been replaced with a riff from "Oh Well" and in recent years, the band often quoted "Smoke on the Water" as well before returning to the main hook. Thus, their live performances of "Mighty Quinn" often run over ten minutes. It's probably the song most often played by Manfred Mann's Earth Band and usually appears as the last song of the regular set or the last encore.

The Manfred Mann version is noted for Klaus Voormann's use of a distinctive flute part. This was replaced in the Earth Band version with Manfred playing it on an organ.

=== Dylan versions ===
A demo of 14 of the 1967 Basement Tapes recordings, including the first of two takes of "Quinn the Eskimo (The Mighty Quinn)", was produced in 1968, but was not intended for release. Recordings taken from the demos began appearing on bootlegs, starting with Great White Wonder, a double-album bootleg that came out in July 1969. The first official release of the song was in 1970 on Dylan's Self Portrait album, a live recording from 1969's Isle of Wight Festival. The live version (titled "The Mighty Quinn (Quinn the Eskimo)") was also selected in 1971 for the second compilation of Dylan's career, Bob Dylan's Greatest Hits Vol. II.

When Columbia finally released The Basement Tapes in 1975, the song was not among the double album's 24 songs (although an Inuk was represented on the album cover, alongside Dylan, The Band, and several other people meant to represent certain characters from some of Dylan's songs). However, ten years later in 1985, the second of the two 1967 takes appeared on the five-LP Biograph set (this time titled "Quinn the Eskimo (The Mighty Quinn)"). This version was used again on The Essential Bob Dylan, a compilation released in 2000. The first of the two 1967 takes was not officially released until 2014, on The Bootleg Series Vol. 11: The Basement Tapes Complete.

=== Variations in title of song ===
The first release of the song, the #1 hit by Manfred Mann, which topped the UK charts in February 1968, was released as "Mighty Quinn". When Dylan released a live version of this song on his album Self Portrait, in June 1970, the song was titled "The Mighty Quinn (Quinn the Eskimo)". This title was repeated when the same live recording was released on the album Bob Dylan's Greatest Hits, Vol. 2 in November 1971. When Dylan's original "basement tapes" recording of the song, backed by The Band and recorded in West Saugerties, New York in 1967, was eventually released as part of the compilation album Biograph, in 1985, it was entitled "Quinn the Eskimo (The Mighty Quinn)"; this is the title according to the official Bob Dylan website.

== Other versions ==
=== Grateful Dead version ===
The Grateful Dead started playing "The Mighty Quinn" in concert in 1985. It became a favorite encore among the Grateful Dead's fans, and remained so to the end of their career.

=== The Hollies version ===
In 1969, the Hollies put their own spin on "The Mighty Quinn", adding a prominent banjo accompaniment, a horn section, and a flute part in reference to Manfred Mann's version. This version was featured as the last song on the Hollies Sing Dylan album, and the group performed the song in concert in 1969 alongside "Blowin' in the Wind".

=== Julie London version ===
In 1969, Julie London sang a version of "The Mighty Quinn" on her final album Yummy, Yummy, Yummy. The album featured multiple covers of contemporary pop and rock songs with full orchestral arrangements, including "Louie Louie", "Light My Fire", and "The Mighty Quinn".

=== Leon Russell version ===
Leon Russell included a version in a medley with "I'll Take You There", "Idol With the Golden Head" and "He Lives (I Serve a Risen Savior)" that opens his album Leon Live.

=== Phish version ===
Phish has played "Quinn the Eskimo" in concert a total of 38 times throughout their career, having first performed in 1985, two years after their formation. The band performed the song at two of their festivals: Camp Oswego in 1999 and Superball IX in 2011. Covers of "Quinn the Eskimo" appear on two Phish live releases: the 1999 live box set Hampton Comes Alive and the 2010 live DVD Alpine Valley.

=== Noel Gallagher version ===
Noel Gallagher performed a live version on Thursday 10 June 2021 for the TV show Out of the Now on Sky Arts. The song closed a 12-song set performed at the Duke of York's Theatre in London's West End. Following that performance, the track was included twice on his 2022 tour of the U.K, before having it as a staple throughout his 2023 North American tour, and eventually keeping it within his setlists for the U.K and Europe legs of his 2023 'Council Skies' tour.

=== Cornershop version ===
Cornershop released a version of the song on their 2009 album Judy Sucks a Lemon for Breakfast, retitled "The Mighty Quinn".

=== Other versions ===
Kris Kristofferson covered the song in 2012 for Chimes of Freedom, in honor of 50 years of Amnesty International. It has also been covered by Swiss rock groups Gotthard and Krokus. Jorn Lande covered this song as a hard rock rendition on his 2019 album Heavy Rock Radio II: Executing the Classics. Hopeton Lewis also released a reggae version of the song in 1969 Reggae Girls - Rescue Me / Hopeton Lewis+Gaylettes - Mighty Quinn In 1969/70, Solomon Burke recorded a version with a gospel choir that was released in 2000 on Proud Mary: The Bell Sessions. Merry Clayton lead a different gospel arrangement of the song as part of an ad hoc collective of session singers called 'The Brothers and Sisters of L.A.' on the 1969 album Dylan's Gospel produced by Lou Adler. American bubblegum pop group the 1910 Fruitgum Company released a version on their 1968 album 1, 2, 3, Red Light.

== Chart history ==
=== Weekly charts ===
Chart (1968)	Peak position
Australia (Go-Set)	6
Austria (Ö3 Austria Top 40)	4
Canada Top Singles RPM	3
Ireland (IRMA)	1
Netherlands (Dutch Top 40)	2
Netherlands (Single Top 100)	2
New Zealand (Listener)	1
Norway (VG-lista)	2
South Africa (Springbok)	14
Sweden	1
Switzerland (Schweizer Hitparade)	2
UK Singles (Official Charts)	1
US Billboard Hot 100	10
US Cash Box Top 100	4
West Germany (GfK)	1

=== Year-end charts ===
Chart (1968)	Rank
Australia	55
Canada	37
UK	20
US Billboard Hot 100	82
US Cash Box	35

== In popular culture ==
A 1989 film, The Mighty Quinn, which is itself based upon the 1971 novel Finding Maubee, takes its name from the song; Dylan makes reference to the movie in his 2004 autobiography Chronicles: Volume One:

On the way back to the house I passed the local movie theater on Prytania Street, where The Mighty Quinn was showing. Years earlier, I had written a song called 'The Mighty Quinn' which was a hit in England, and I wondered what the movie was about. Eventually, I'd sneak off and go there to see it. It was a mystery, suspense, Jamaican thriller with Denzel Washington as the Mighty Xavier Quinn a detective who solves crimes. Funny, that's just the way I imagined him when I wrote the song 'The Mighty Quinn,' Denzel Washington.

The Pittsburgh Penguins NHL hockey team has used a parody version of the song, called "The Mighty 'Guins," as a fight song.

The second season premiere of Joe Pera Talks With You begins with the student choir performing the song, with Joe conducting.
