= List of Basement Tapes songs =

The Basement Tapes is a collection of over 100 songs recorded by Bob Dylan and his then-backing group, the Band, in the summer of 1967 in West Saugerties, New York, just outside Woodstock. Recording sessions began in a den known as "The Red Room" in Dylan's home, before moving to an improvised recording studio in the basement of a house known as Big Pink, where Rick Danko, Richard Manuel and Garth Hudson lived. Roughly half the songs recorded on The Basement Tapes were covers of traditional folk and blues ballads, rock songs, and country music, and half were original compositions by Dylan.

Fourteen basement tape songs appeared in 1968 on a demo privately circulated by Dylan's publishing company, Dwarf Music. Public awareness of the basement recordings increased with the release of the first bootleg, Great White Wonder, in 1969. In 1975 CBS officially released The Basement Tapes, but only sixteen of the twenty-four songs were recorded by Dylan and the Band in Woodstock in 1967. The other eight tracks were recordings by the Band from different times. Subsequently, more and more basement recordings have been unearthed and illicitly released, culminating in the release of a five-CD bootleg set in 1990, The Genuine Basement Tapes, containing 108 tracks. Two songs, "I Shall Be Released" and "Santa-Fe" were officially released on The Bootleg Series Volumes 1–3 (Rare & Unreleased) 1961–1991 in 1991. "I'm Not There" was released on the soundtrack album accompanying the biographical film about Dylan, directed by Todd Haynes, named after the song. "Minstrel Boy" was released in 2013 on The Bootleg Series Vol. 10: Another Self Portrait (1969–1971). The songs of the Basement Tapes have been catalogued by Greil Marcus in his book Invisible Republic, and by Sid Griffin in his critical study Million Dollar Bash: Bob Dylan, the Band, and the Basement Tapes.

On November 4, 2014, Columbia/Legacy issued The Bootleg Series Vol. 11: The Basement Tapes Complete, an official 6-CD box set containing 138 tracks which comprise all of Dylan's basement recordings, including 30 never-bootlegged tracks.

Below is an alphabetical list of songs from these recording sessions. This list does not include songs that feature only the members of the Band.

== Songs ==
Song title	Writer(s)	Notes
"Ain't No More Cane"	Traditional	Released in two takes with a Dylan vocal on The Bootleg Series Vol. 11: The Basement Tapes Complete. The version of “Ain’t No More Cane” on the 1975 album features only the Band without a Dylan vocal. This version of the song has been identified by Griffin (pp. 299–300), quoting album engineer Rob Fraboni, as having been newly recorded by the Band for the 1975 album. But the credits on the Band compilation A Musical History, which was executive-produced by Robbie Robertson, lists the recording date for the version of the song on the 1975 album as 1967 or 1968.
"All American Boy"	Bill Parsons, Orville Lunsford	Originally a hit for Bobby Bare, the song has references to Elvis Presley's manager, Colonel Tom Parker. Dylan's version has different lyrics, and some have seen the song as being critical of his own manager during the 1960s, Albert Grossman.
"All You Have to Do is Dream" (takes 1 and 2)	Dylan	Levon Helm, who was absent for much of the Basement Tapes sessions, is believed to be playing drums on both takes of this song, which makes the song one of the last recorded during the basement sessions, perhaps in late 1967 or early 1968.
"Apple Suckling Tree" (takes 1 & 2)	Dylan	Griffin suggests this song features either Robertson on drums and Manuel on tambourine, or the other way around. It is written to the tune of "Frog Went A-Courting". The second take, with some additional overdubs added, was released on the 1975 album.
"The Auld Triangle"	Dick Shannon	Also known as "The Royal Canal" and "The Banks of The Royal Canal", the song is often misattributed to Brendan Behan as it featured in his first play, The Quare Fellow, which is set in Mountjoy Prison, Dublin.
"Baby Ain't That Fine"	Dallas Frazier	A 1966 country hit duet for Melba Montgomery and Gene Pitney.
"Baby, Won't You Be My Baby"	Dylan	A Dylan original, the song has been described by Ben Rollins as a "melding of Blues, Country, and Memphis soul."
"Be Careful of the Stones You Throw" (false start and take)	Bonnie Dodd	Composed by Dodd, who played pedal steel in the Tex Ritter band, the song was first recorded by Little Jimmy Dickens in 1949, and Hank Williams released the song under his "Luke the Drifter" moniker in 1952. The song was a hit for Dion DiMucci and Hank Williams Jr in the 1960s.
"Belchazaar" (false start and take)	Johnny Cash	A Johnny Cash song released in 1957. One of several Cash covers recorded during the Basement Tapes sessions.
"Bells of Rhymney"	Idris Davies, Pete Seeger	Davies, a Welsh miner, originally wrote this as a poem about the General Strike of 1926; it was later set to music by Seeger. Recorded by The Byrds on the Mr. Tambourine Man album and by Pete Seeger on his Pete Seeger and Sonny Terry at Carnegie Hall album.
"Big River" (takes 1 and 2)	Cash	One of several Johnny Cash covers from the sessions. Cash recorded the song for Sun Records in 1958. Take one breaks down.
"Blowin' in the Wind"	Dylan	Released on The Bootleg Series Vol. 11: The Basement Tapes Complete. Although The Hawks had played with Dylan for two years, they had never performed this classic Dylan song live. Both Robbie Robertson and Garth Hudson take extended solos.
"Bonnie Ship the Diamond"	Traditional	A traditional sea shanty.
"Bourbon Street"	Dylan	This, along with "Don't Ya Tell Henry", prominently features the trombone.
"Bring it on Home"	Bo Diddley, Dylan	A variation of Bo Diddley's "Bring It To Jerome", recorded in 1955.
"Clothes Line Saga" (false start and take)	Dylan	Also known as "Answer to Ode", this song is widely believed to be a parody of Bobbie Gentry's 1967 hit "Ode to Billie Joe".
"Come All Ye Fair and Tender Ladies"	Traditional	
"Comin' Round the Mountain"	Traditional; under copyright	A western song copyrighted by Spencer Williams in 1923.
"Confidential"	Dorinda Morgan	Cover of a 1956 hit by Sonny Knight.
"Cool Water"	Bob Nolan	A song widely recorded by a variety of artists.
"Crash on the Levee (Down in the Flood)" (takes 1 and 2)	Dylan	Take two was released on the 1975 album.
"Don't Ya Tell Henry"	Dylan	The 1975 album features the song, but that recording is without Dylan's vocal.
"Don't You Try Me Now	Dylan	–
"Down on Me"	Traditional	This is just a fragment of a traditional song which had been recorded by both Odetta and Eric von Schmidt.
"Dress it Up, Better Have it All"	Dylan	A sketch for a song with half-completed lyrics with a rockabilly sound, including three guitar solos by Robbie Robertson, reminiscent of the Carl Perkins sound.
"Edge of the Ocean"	Dylan	Previously unreleased on bootleg, this song was heard for the first time on The Basement Tapes Complete, and has been described as an early basement recording, made in Dylan's home in Woodstock before the move to Big Pink.
"Flight of the Bumblebee"	Rimsky-Korsakov	Not really a cover of the song itself, it seems to be an improvisation begun by Dylan and the Hawks after being amused by Manuel playing a few seconds of "Flight of the Bumblebee", with the lyrics sounding "as if it's poetry night in a 1956 San Francisco jazz club."
"Folsom Prison Blues"	Cash	Another Johnny Cash cover, first recorded by Cash in 1956.
"A Fool Such as I"	Bill Trader	This was a hit for Hank Snow on the country charts in 1953, and a number 2 pop hit for Elvis Presley in 1959.
"Four Strong Winds"	Ian Tyson	One of a number of Ian and Sylvia Tyson songs. Ian and Sylvia recorded several Basement Tapes songs as well.
"The French Girl" (false start and 2 takes)	Tyson	Another Ian and Sylvia Tyson song. Dylan would return to this in the late 1980s while touring with The Grateful Dead.
"Get Your Rocks Off"	Dylan	A Basement Tapes original later covered by Manfred Mann's Earth Band on their 1973 album Messin'.
"Going Down the Road Feeling Bad"	Traditional	First recorded in 1923 by Henry Whitter. John Ford used it for his film adaptation of Steinbeck's The Grapes of Wrath. By the time Dylan informally recorded it during the basement sessions, he had been playing the song for several years.
"Goin' to Acapulco"	Dylan	An original Dylan song which was unknown until it was released on the 1975 album.
"Gonna Get You Now"	Dylan	A funky, bawdy groove characterizes this unfinished song.
"The Hills of Mexico"	Traditional	A variant of the song "On the Trail of the Buffalo." Dylan ends the performance near the three-minute mark, advising Garth Hudson not to record the performance as it is just "wasting tape". This song has been recorded by Woody Guthrie, Johnny Cash, and many others. During his Never Ending Tour, Dylan performed "On the Trail of the Buffalo" many times.
"I Can't Come in With a Broken Heart"	Dylan	Described by Griffin as a one-chord rocker which fails to find the groove.
"I Can't Make it Alone"	Dylan	An unfinished song sketch with a tune reminiscent of "She's Not There" by The Zombies.
"I Don't Hurt Anymore"	Don Robertson, Jack Rollins	First recorded by Hank Snow in 1954, where it became a number one hit in the country charts.
"I Forgot to Remember to Forget"	Stan Kesler, Charlie Feathers	Made famous by Elvis Presley in 1955. This version bears little resemblance to Elvis's rendition.
"I Shall Be Released"	Dylan	Perhaps the most famous Basement Tapes number, and the most widely covered. However, it was not included in the 1975 album. This 1967 recording was finally released by Sony in 1991 on The Bootleg Series Volumes 1–3.
"I'm Alright"	Dylan	Only a fragment.
"I'm a Fool for You"	Dylan	Rollins describes this as a song which Dylan begins to teach the Band, but never completes.
"I'm Guilty of Loving You"	Dylan	Another fragment. Greil Marcus states this may be loosely based on Jim Reeves' 1963 song "Guilty".
"I'm in the Mood for Love"	John Lee Hooker	Recorded by John Lee Hooker in 1951. Robertson and Danko also recorded the song in 1965 with John Hammond, Jr.
"I'm Not There"	Dylan	One of the most famous and highly regarded outtakes, not just of the Basement Tapes, but Dylan's whole career. The 2007 film about Dylan entitled I'm Not There takes its title from this song, which was released on the film's soundtrack.
"I'm Your Teenage Prayer" (false start and take)	Dylan	
"If I Were a Carpenter"	Tim Hardin	A rollicking version of the Hardin song which was a top ten hit for Bobby Darin in 1966.
"Johnny Todd"	Traditional	A sea chanty revived during the early 1950s by the folk revival. Made widely known by Bob Roberts.
"Joshua Gone Barbados"	Eric Von Schmidt	Recorded by von Schmidt in 1963. Von Schmidt also taught Dylan the song "Baby, Let Me Follow You Down", written by Reverend Gary Davis which Dylan covered on his debut album in 1962 and also played in the 1966 shows with the Band for the world tour.
"Kickin’ My Dog Around"	Traditional	Two different accounts of the origins of this song have been published. Alan Lomax published it as "The Hound Dawg Song" in his book, The Folk Songs of North America (1960), and suggests that the song's origins date back to the 1880s. The song has been credited to 19th century African-American minstrel performer James A. Bland, although this version descends into "a goofy call and response barnyard litany". Sources agree earliest recorded version was released by Gid Tanner and his Skillet Lickers in 1928.
"The King of France"	Dylan	
"Lock Your Door"	Dylan	Only a fragment.
"Lo and Behold!" (takes 1 & 2)	Dylan	Take two was released on the 1975 album.
"Minstrel Boy"	Dylan	A live version recorded during Dylan's performance at Isle of Wight Festival 1969 was released in 1970 on Self Portrait; however, this recording from 1967 was unknown until its release on 2013's The Bootleg Series Vol. 10 – Another Self Portrait (1969–1971).
"Million Dollar Bash" (takes 1 & 2)	Dylan	One of the best known basement songs, released on the 1975 album. Recorded by Fairport Convention and released in 1969 on Unhalfbricking. Cash Box said that "Dylan leads a nonsense/rapsong about the party of parties where everybody must have gotten stoned." Take two was released on the 1975 album.
"Mr. Blue"	Dewayne Blackwell	This song was a number one hit for The Fleetwoods in 1959.
"My Bucket's Got a Hole in It"	Clarence Williams	This song reached number 4 on the Country Charts when Hank Williams released it as a single in 1949.
"Nine Hundred Miles"	Traditional	Woody Guthrie made this song a folk standard.
"Nothing Was Delivered" (takes 1 & 2, fragment)	Dylan	Take one was released on the 1975 album. Recorded by The Byrds and released in 1968 on Sweetheart of the Rodeo.
"Odds and Ends" (takes 1 & 2)	Dylan	Take two was released on the 1975 album with overdubs.
"Ol' Roison the Beau"	Traditional	A folk revival standard.
"On a Rainy Afternoon"	Dylan	Griffin notes that Dylan recorded a song with the same title in a Glasgow hotel room in May 1966. This is a different song, described by Griffin as sounding like "a pounding outtake from Highway 61 Revisited."
"One For the Road"	Dylan	The song has been described as an enjoyably sloppy, improvised version of a Sinatra number ("One for My Baby (and One More for the Road)").
"One Man's Loss"	Dylan	Marcus states this is probably loosely based on Dick Thomas's 1950 Hank William's-styled "One Man's Loss is Another Man's Gain".
"One Single River"	Ian Tyson, Peter Gzowski	Another Ian and Sylvia song, which they recorded under the title "Song for Canada".
"One Too Many Mornings"	Dylan	Released on The Bootleg Series Vol. 11: The Basement Tapes Complete. Richard Manuel sings the first verse before Dylan's vocal takes over.
"Open the Door, Homer" (takes 1, 2, and 3)	Dylan	The chorus echoes the 1947 hit song "Open the Door, Richard" by Jack McVea, which reached number one in the charts in 1947, recorded by Count Basie. Take one was released on the 1975 album.
"People Get Ready"	Curtis Mayfield	
"Please Mrs. Henry"	Dylan	Appears on the acetate and the 1975 album. Notable for Paul McCartney trying to get the Beatles to record it during the Let It Be sessions. Other bands to cover the song include Cheap Trick, Manfred Mann's Earth Band and Chris Spedding.
"Po' Lazarus"	Traditional	A song Dylan originally performed in 1961.
"Quinn the Eskimo (The Mighty Quinn)" (takes 1 and 2)	Dylan	This Basement Tapes song was a hit for Manfred Mann in January 1968, reaching number one in the UK singles chart. Dylan's take one originally appeared on the first rock bootleg album, Great White Wonder, in 1969. Take two appeared on Dylan's 1985 compilation album Biograph.
"Rock, Salt, and Nails"	Utah Phillips	First recorded by Rosalie Sorrels, made a hit by the bluegrass artists Flatt & Scruggs.
"Roll On Train"	Dylan	It has been suggested this early Basement song was recorded in the "Red Room" of Dylan's home, Hi Lo Ha, in the Byrdcliffe area of Woodstock.
"Santa-Fe"	Dylan	A Dylan original that was finally released on The Bootleg Series Volumes 1–3 in 1991.
"See That My Grave Is Kept Clean"	Blind Lemon Jefferson	First recorded in 1928 by Jefferson, famously included in the Anthology of American Folk Music, and first recorded by Dylan in 1962 for his eponymous debut album. On the officially released box set, it was titled "One Kind Favor".
"See You Later Allen Ginsberg"	Dylan	Variation on "See You Later, Alligator". The title is coined by one of the members of the Band at the beginning of the first take, causing Dylan to laugh. Years later Robbie Robertson referred to some of these sessions as "reefer run amok". The first take ends abruptly, with Dylan giving instructions to erase the take.
"Silent Weekend"	Dylan	A Dylan composition described by Griffin as rockabilly, and suitable for a Ronnie Hawkins interpretation.
"Sign on the Cross"	Dylan	The longest recording of the Basement Tapes, and often regarded as one of the highlights from the sessions.
"Silhouettes"	Frank Slay Jr., Bob Crewe	A very brief cover of The Rays' number 3 doo-wop song, released in 1957.
"Spanish is the Loving Tongue"	Charles Badger Clark	Written by 'the cowboy poet' Charles Badger Clark, and published in 1915 as a poem: "A Border Affair"; it was later set to music by Billy Simon. Dylan subsequently recorded this song twice; the second version was released as the B-side of his 1971 single "Watching the River Flow"; the third version was released on Columbia's so-called "revenge album", Dylan, in 1973, but was recorded earlier, during the Self Portrait sessions in Nashville in 1969.
"The Spanish Song" (takes 1 & 2)	Dylan	This song, and its partner Take two, are bizarre recordings by Dylan and the Band, suggesting a high-spirited caricature of Spanish music. Griffin suggests that the improvised lyrics and encouraging laughter give these recordings the quality of a party tape. Greil Marcus described these recording as "complete dementia with the spirit of Sam Peckinpah present to crack the whip".
"Still in Town, Still Around"	Hank Cochran, Harlan Howard	One of several songs covered by Dylan and the Band that were most familiar from Johnny Cash versions.
"This Wheel's on Fire"	Dylan, Rick Danko	A Basement Tapes original covered by the Band on Music From Big Pink, and also released on the official 1975 album.
"Tears of Rage" (takes 1, 2, 3)	Dylan, Richard Manuel	The first take of one of the most famous Basement Tapes songs. The song has gone on to be one of the most covered tunes from the basement sessions. The Band recorded their own version, which appeared as the opening track of their first album, Music From Big Pink. Take two breaks down, and take three was released on the 1975 album.
"Tiny Montgomery"	Dylan	Released on the 1975 album.
"Too Much of Nothing" (takes 1 and 2)	Dylan	Take one appears on the 1975 album, and is notably different in arrangement from take two, which appeared on Great White Wonder.
"Try Me Little Girl"	Dylan	A jazzy blues in which Dylan sings in a weak falsetto voice.
"Tupelo"	John Lee Hooker	Recorded by Hooker in 1959.
"Under Control	Dylan	Rollins describes this song as a sketch driven by Robbie Robertson's heavy-duty guitar riff which uses cadences not usually associated with the blues.
"Waltzing with Sin" (false start and take)	Red Hayes-Sonny Burns	–
"Wild Wolf"	Dylan	Released on The Basement Tapes Complete, this Dylan composition had not previously been heard on any bootleg. Critic Bill Wyman wrote: "Brooding and impeccably arranged, it is utterly sensational and unlike anything Dylan had recorded up to that point; it contains all the nuance and power he would (unsuccessfully) go for on the moodier tracks on Street-Legal ten years later.
"Wildwood Flower"	A. P. Carter	A song which The Carter Family made a standard, taking the song all the way to the number 3 spot in the music charts in 1928.
"Yea! Heavy and a Bottle of Bread" (takes 1 & 2)	Dylan	Take two appears on the 1975 release.
"You Ain't Goin' Nowhere" (takes 1 & 2)	Dylan	On the first take, the lyrics of this song are both improvised and absurd: "Now look here, dear soup, you must feed the cats/ The cats need feeding and you're the one to do it/ Get your hat and feed the cats/ You ain't goin' nowhere". The lyrics are tightened up by take two, providing a chance to hear Dylan's improvisational style of writing in action. Dylan recorded this again, with slightly different lyrics, for Greatest Hits II. Take two was released on the 1975 album.
"You Win Again"	Hank Williams	Williams released the song in 1952. Dylan models his version on the Jerry Lee Lewis B-side version to "Great Balls of Fire", which was a number 2 hit in 1957.
"Young But Daily Growing"	Traditional	One of the oldest songs in Dylan's repertoire. A recording exists of Dylan singing this song in Minneapolis in 1961. Although he has additional accompaniment, this recording sounds very similar to his 1961 rendition.

== Sources ==
- Barker, Derek. Bob Dylan: The Songs He Didn't Write: Bob Dylan Under the Influence (New Malden: Chrome Dreams 2008). ISBN 978-1-84240-424-9
- Griffin, Sid. Million Dollar Bash: Bob Dylan, the Band, and the Basement Tapes (London: Jawbone, 2007). ISBN 978-1-906002-05-3
- Heylin, Clinton. The Recording Sessions [1960–1994] (New York: St. Martin's Press, 1995). ISBN 0-312-15067-9
- Marcus, Greil, with Michael Simmons. The Bootleg Series Vol. 10 – Another Self Portrait (1969–1971) CD booklet (2013).
- Marcus, Greil. Invisible Republic: Bob Dylan's Basement Tapes (New York: Henry Holt, 1997) ISBN 0-8050-3393-9 later re-published as:
- Marcus, Greil. The Old, Weird America (New York: St Martin's Press, 2001) ISBN 978-0-312-42043-7
- Sounes, Howard, Down the Highway: The Life of Bob Dylan, Grove Press, 2001. ISBN 0-8021-1686-8

== See also ==
- The Basement Tapes (1975 album)
- The Bootleg Series Vol. 11: The Basement Tapes Complete
- List of Basement Tapes songs (1975)
