= Dylan's Gospel =

Studio album by The Brothers and Sisters of L.A.
- Released: 1969
- Genre: Gospel
- Length: 36:49
- Label: Ode
- Producer: Lou Adler

Dylan's Gospel is the only studio album by The Brothers & Sisters of L.A., a group of vocalists working as session musicians in the Los Angeles, California area during the album's recording in June 1969. The Brothers & Sisters of L.A. was organized by Lou Adler specifically to record the album, which consists of gospel music-style covers of Bob Dylan songs. Members of the group included Merry Clayton and Gloria Jones. The album was first released in 1969 by Adler's own Ode Records label. It was initially a commercial flop, which convinced Adler not to reunite the Brothers and Sisters of L.A. for another performance. It was reissued by Light in the Attic Records on April 1, 2014.

Professional ratings
Review scores
Source	Rating
AllMusic	3.5/5 stars
Pitchfork	7.0/10
Rolling Stone	3.5/5 stars
The Village Voice	C–

== Track listing ==
All tracks are written by Bob Dylan

No.	Title	Length
1.	"The Times They Are a-Changin'"	2:45
2.	"I Shall Be Released"	4:20
3.	"Lay Lady Lay"	3:29
4.	"Mr. Tambourine Man"	3:55
5.	"All Along the Watchtower"	3:31
6.	"The Mighty Quinn"	3:34
7.	"Chimes of Freedom"	4:33
8.	"I'll Be Your Baby Tonight"	2:24
9.	"My Back Pages"	5:14
10.	"Just Like a Woman"	3:04
Total length:		36:49

== Personnel ==
=== The Brothers & Sisters of L.A. ===
- Andrew Herd
- Barbara Perrault
- Billy Storm
- Brenda Fitz
- Carolyn Willis
- Chester Pipkin
- Clydie King
- Don Wyatt
- Edna Wright
- Edward Wallace
- Fred Willis
- Georgetta Finchess
- Ginger Blake
- Gloria Jones
- Gwen Johnson
- Hazel Carmichael
- Jesse Kirkland
- Joseph Green
- Julia Tillman
- Lolietha White
- Marjorie Cranford
- Merry Clayton
- Oma Drake
- Patrice Holloway
- Ruby Johnson
- Sherlie Matthews
- Sherrell Atwood
- Shirley Allen

=== Technical personnel ===
- Lou Adler - producer
- Gene Page - arranger

== See also ==
- List of songs written by Bob Dylan
- List of artists who have covered Bob Dylan songs
