= The Mighty Quinn (film) =

1989 American film by Carl Schenkel

- Film poster
- Directed by: Carl Schenkel
- Screenplay by: Hampton Fancher
- Based on: Finding Maubee by A. H. Z. Carr
- Produced by: Sandy Lieberson; Marion Hunt; Ed Elbert
- Starring: Denzel Washington; James Fox; Mimi Rogers; M. Emmet Walsh; Sheryl Lee Ralph; Robert Townsend
- Cinematography: Jacques Steyn
- Edited by: John Jympson
- Music by: Anne Dudley
- Production company: A&M Films
- Distributed by: Metro-Goldwyn-Mayer
- Release date: February 16, 1989
- Running time: 98 minutes
- Country: United States
- Language: English
- Box office: $4,557,214

The Mighty Quinn is a 1989 American mystery thriller film starring Denzel Washington in the title role, alongside Robert Townsend, James Fox, Mimi Rogers, M. Emmet Walsh, and Sheryl Lee Ralph. The screenplay by Hampton Fancher is based on A. H. Z. Carr's 1971 novel Finding Maubee. In the film, Washington plays Xavier Quinn, a police chief who tries to help his childhood friend Maubee (Townsend) after he becomes a murder suspect.

The film takes its name from the Bob Dylan song of the same name, and a reggae cover version performed by Michael Rose, Sheryl Lee Ralph, Cedella Marley and Sharon Marley Prendergast which appears on the soundtrack. Film critic Roger Ebert gave the film an overwhelmingly positive review, calling it one of the best films of 1989. He described the film as "a spy thriller, a buddy movie, a musical, a comedy and a picture that is wise about human nature."

== Plot ==
Xavier Quinn is the chief of police of a small island in the Caribbean. When Donald Pater, the millionaire owner of a luxury resort hotel, is found murdered, everyone assumes that the culprit is Maubee, a petty crook who also is Quinn's best friend. Quinn does not believe it and clashes with the island's inept Governor Chalk and his arrogant political fixer Thomas Elgin. Quinn's worries over the murder exacerbate his troubles at home; he is estranged from his wife, Lola, and rarely has time to see his son.

Maubee eludes the police at every turn. Quinn questions a witness, who says that Maubee had a (rare) United States $10,000 bill. Trying to track down Maubee, Quinn questions Ubu Pearl, the local witch and aunt of Maubee's girlfriend, Isola.

Chalk introduces Quinn to Fred Miller, an affable American said to represent Pater's company. Pater had been found floating in a hot tub, decapitated. Against Chalk's instructions, Quinn has the body autopsied and finds that Pater died of a venomous snake bite and was already dead when his head was cut off. Quinn arrests Jose Patina, who claims to be on vacation, but has also been questioning people about Maubee's whereabouts.

After Patina is bailed out of jail, he confers with Miller in a seedy hotel. Miller tells him the "operation" is over, then kills Patina. Miller goes to Ubu Pearl and demands to know where Maubee is. When she refuses, he burns down her house, with her inside.

Quinn discovers that Pater, a close associate of the President of the United States, brought stacks of $10,000 bills to the island to be picked up by Patina. The President wants to fund an anti-Communist revolution in Latin America, but Congress would not support this. The President acts illegally, using the CIA to deliver discontinued currency that is still legal but will not be missed from storage at the US Treasury. The murder interfered with the plan, so the CIA sent Miller to retrieve the money and "plug up the holes."

Quinn tracks Maubee down at their childhood playground in an ancient ruin. Maubee explains that Pater impregnated Isola when she was a maid at his hotel. When Ubu Pearl demanded that Pater support the child, Pater fired Isola. Ubu Pearl instructed Isola to go to the hotel and leave a snake in Pater's room. Maubee sped to the hotel and arrived just as Pater was dying from the snakebite. He cut off Pater's head, put his body into the tub to attempt to conceal the cause of death, and grabbed the sack of money.

Miller appears and holds the pair at gunpoint. Maubee hands over the money and Miller departs in a helicopter. Enraged, Maubee grabs onto the helicopter as it lifts off over the ocean. Miller shoots at Maubee and Quinn watches helplessly as his friend's body falls into the ocean. A snake hidden in the sack of money slithers out and fatally bites the helicopter pilot. Miller struggles to regain control, but the helicopter crashes into the old ruins and explodes.

Grieved at the loss of his friend, Quinn returns home and reconciles with his wife. As he walks on the beach with his son, the camera pans down to show a line of barefoot prints emerging from the water, leading to a rock with a $10,000 bill sitting on it.

== Cast ==
- Denzel Washington as Chief Xavier Quinn
- Robert Townsend as Maubee
- James Fox as Thomas Elgin
- Mimi Rogers as Hadley Elgin
- M. Emmet Walsh as Fred Miller
- Sheryl Lee Ralph as Lola Quinn
- Esther Rolle as Ubu Pearl
- Art Evans as Officer "Jump" Jones
- Henry Judd Baker as Nicotine
- Norman Beaton as Governor Chalk
- Alex Colon as Jose Patina
- Tyra Ferrell as Isola
- Keye Luke as Dr. Raj
- Carl Bradshaw as Cocodick, The Prisoner
- Ron Taylor as Officer McKeon
- Oliver Samuels as Officer Rupert

== Production ==
In October 1971, producer Robert Rosenthal enlisted Larry Cohen to pen a screenplay adapted from A. H. Z. Carr's novel, Finding Maubee, which was published posthumously. Actors Sammy Davis Jr. and Lou Gossett signed on for roles, with Sy Marsh and Robert Rosenthal set to produce. However, this version of the project was shelved. In May 1988, A & M Films secured the movie rights to the book for $75,000. Rita Marley, wife of reggae legend Bob Marley, had a cameo as a wedding band singer. By December 1988, the film's title was changed to The Mighty Quinn, inspired by the Bob Dylan song. This decision came after a test audience mistakenly believed "Finding Maubee" and the credit "Robert Townsend as Maubee" implied Townsend was the lead actor. To adhere to contractual obligations regarding Townsend's character name, the title was altered. Principal photography wrapped in Port Antonio, Jamaica, by June 1988. Interior scenes of Donald Pater's mansion were filmed at Golden Clouds Villa in Oracabessa.

== Reception ==
The Mighty Quinn gained mostly positive reviews from critics. It holds an 89% rating on review aggregator Rotten Tomatoes based on 18 reviews, with an average rating of 6.5/10. The website's critics consensus reads, "A deft hybrid of laughs, espionage, and music, The Mighty Quinn is a smart, pleasant entertainment that offers an early example of Denzel Washington's onscreen magnetism." On Metacritic, the film holds a weighted average score of 71 out of 100 based on 11 reviews, indicating "generally favorable reviews".

Roger Ebert gave the film four stars. The high point, he said, was Washington's performance:

The film stars Denzel Washington in one of those roles that creates a movie star overnight. You might have imagined that would have happened to Washington after he starred in "Cry Freedom" as the South African hero Stephen Biko. He got an Oscar nomination for that performance, but it didn't even begin to hint at his reserves of charm, sexiness and offbeat humor. In an effortless way that reminds me of Robert Mitchum, Michael Caine or Sean Connery in the best of the Bond pictures, he is able to be tough and gentle at the same time, able to play a hero and yet not take himself too seriously.

Bob Dylan makes reference to the movie in his 2004 autobiography Chronicles: Volume One:

On the way back to the house I passed the local movie theater on Prytania Street, where The Mighty Quinn was showing. Years earlier, I had written a song called 'The Mighty Quinn' which was a hit in England, and I wondered what the movie was about. Eventually, I'd sneak off and go there to see it. It was a mystery, suspense, Jamaican thriller with Denzel Washington as the Mighty Xavier Quinn a detective who solves crimes. Funny, that's just the way I imagined him when I wrote the song 'The Mighty Quinn,' Denzel Washington.
