= Whispering Pines (The Band song) =

- Cover to the French single release

Single by The Band

from the album The Band
- B-side: "Lonesome Suzie"
- Released: 1970
- Genre: Rock
- Length: 3:58
- Label: Capitol
- Songwriter(s): Richard Manuel, Robbie Robertson
- Producer(s): John Simon

"Whispering Pines" is a song written by Richard Manuel and Robbie Robertson that was first released by The Band on their self-titled 1969 album The Band. It was released as a single in France, backed by "Lonesome Suzie".

== Lyrics and music ==
"Whispering Pines" is a ballad on the theme of loneliness. Manuel wrote the melody and vocal line but could not come up with the lyrics, so Robertson wrote the lyrics. According to Robertson, "Richard always had this very plaintive attitude in his voice, and sometimes just in his sensitivity as a person. I tried to follow that, to go with it and find it musically. We both felt very good about this song." The lyrics are filled with images of loneliness such as a lonely foghorn, crashing waves and the titular whispering pines. Allmusic critic Bill Janovitz notes that pines are prevalent in Woodstock, New York, where the Band was living, and in Canada, where most of the group is originally from. According to music critic Barney Hoskyns, "the lyric that Robbie worked around Richard's vocal lines was one of the most beautiful he ever wrote, a song of intense loneliness set beside an ocean that seemed to symbolize the singer's endless sense of loss."

According to Band manager Joe Forno, Manuel had written the melody on a piano that had one key which was out of tune. He decided to tune the piano that was used for the recording the same way, and that provides the repeating piano figure at the beginning of the song. Despite the sad imagery, Hoskins hears resolution and peace in the music, and notes that the last words of the song state that "the lost are found." Rolling Stone critic Greil Marcus also finds optimism in the song, but "only because it is so full of desire." Janovitz finds some hope in the line "If only one star shines, that's enough to get inside."

Associated Press writer Mary Campbell described the song as stressing "the western of country-western," which she described as "a very good idea."

== Recording ==
"Whispering Pines" was one of the last three songs recorded for The Band, along with "Up on Cripple Creek" and "Jemima Surrender."

Manuel sings the lead vocal and plays piano. As described by music critic Nick DeRiso, he reaches "for vocal places in an unguardedly heartbroken way." Robertson has stated that "The hurt in his voice ... there's a certain element of pain in there, that you didn't know if he was trying to reach the note or he was just a guy with a heart that had been hurt." Drummer Levon Helm joins him on the last verse in a call and response structure that music critic Barney Hoskyns calls "one of the saddest and loveliest passages of music in the history of rock."

Besides Manuel's "vulnerable" singing and "delicate" piano playing, Janovitz and Hoskins also praise Robertson's acoustic guitar playing, which Hoskins describes as "delicate" and Garth Hudson's Lowrey organ playing, which according to Hoskins provides "magical sounds." Janovitz also explicitly praises Helm's drumming and Rick Danko's "thoughtful" bass.

== Reception ==
Janovitz describes "Whispering Pines" as "one of the Band's most beautiful songs, if not the most gorgeous." Music critic Nick DeRiso says "it may be the most unbearably sad thing the Band ever did." Billboard regarded the song as one of The Band's "most haunting ballads." Author George Case likewise wrote that "Whispering Pines" is "one of the most haunting ballads in rock 'n' roll."

"Whispering Pines" has appeared on several of the Band's compilation albums. It appeared as one of the bonus tracks on the 1995 reissue of The Best of the Band. It also appeared on the box sets Across the Great Divide and A Musical History.

== Cover versions ==
"Whispering Pines" has been covered by such artists as Damon & Naomi and Kelly Hogan. Damon & Naomi's version appeared on their 1995 album Wondrous World of Damon & Naomi. Hogan's version appeared on her 1999 album Beneath the Country Underdog.

Dar Williams also covered the song on her 2003 album The Beauty of the Rain. Allmusic critic Gregory McIntosh described Williams' version as being "initially stunning," with a "lovely" backing and new age influence, but criticized the impact of Cliff Eberhardt's guest vocal in the last verse. Jakob Dylan and Lizz Wright covered "Whispering Pines" on Endless Highway: The Music of The Band. Allmusic critic Thom Jurek called this version "gorgeous." Ben Windham of The Tuscaloosa News described it as "absolutely haunting."
