= Music from Big Pink =

Studio album by the Band
- Released: July 1, 1968
- Recorded: Early 1968
- Studios: A&R, New York; Capitol, Los Angeles
- Genres: Americana; roots rock; country rock
- Length: 42:22
- Label: Capitol
- Producer: John Simon

The Band chronology
Music from Big Pink (1968)	The Band (1969)

Singles from Music from Big Pink
- 1. "The Weight" / "I Shall Be Released" Released: August 1968

Music from Big Pink is the debut studio album by the Canadian-American rock band the Band. Released on July 1, 1968, by Capitol Records, it employs a distinctive blend of country, rock, folk, classical, R&B, blues, and soul. The album's title refers to a house in West Saugerties, New York called "Big Pink", which was shared by bassist/singer Rick Danko, pianist/singer Richard Manuel and keyboardist Garth Hudson and in which the album's music was partly composed. The album itself was recorded at A & R Recording in New York and Capitol Studios in Los Angeles in early 1968, and followed the band's stint backing Bob Dylan on his 1966 tour (as the Hawks) and time spent together in upstate New York recording material that was officially released in 1975 as The Basement Tapes, also with Dylan. The cover artwork is a painting by Dylan. In 2000, the album was re-released with additional outtakes from the recording sessions, and in 2018, a "50th Anniversary Super Deluxe" edition was released with a new stereo mix by Bob Clearmountain.

== Background and Big Pink house ==
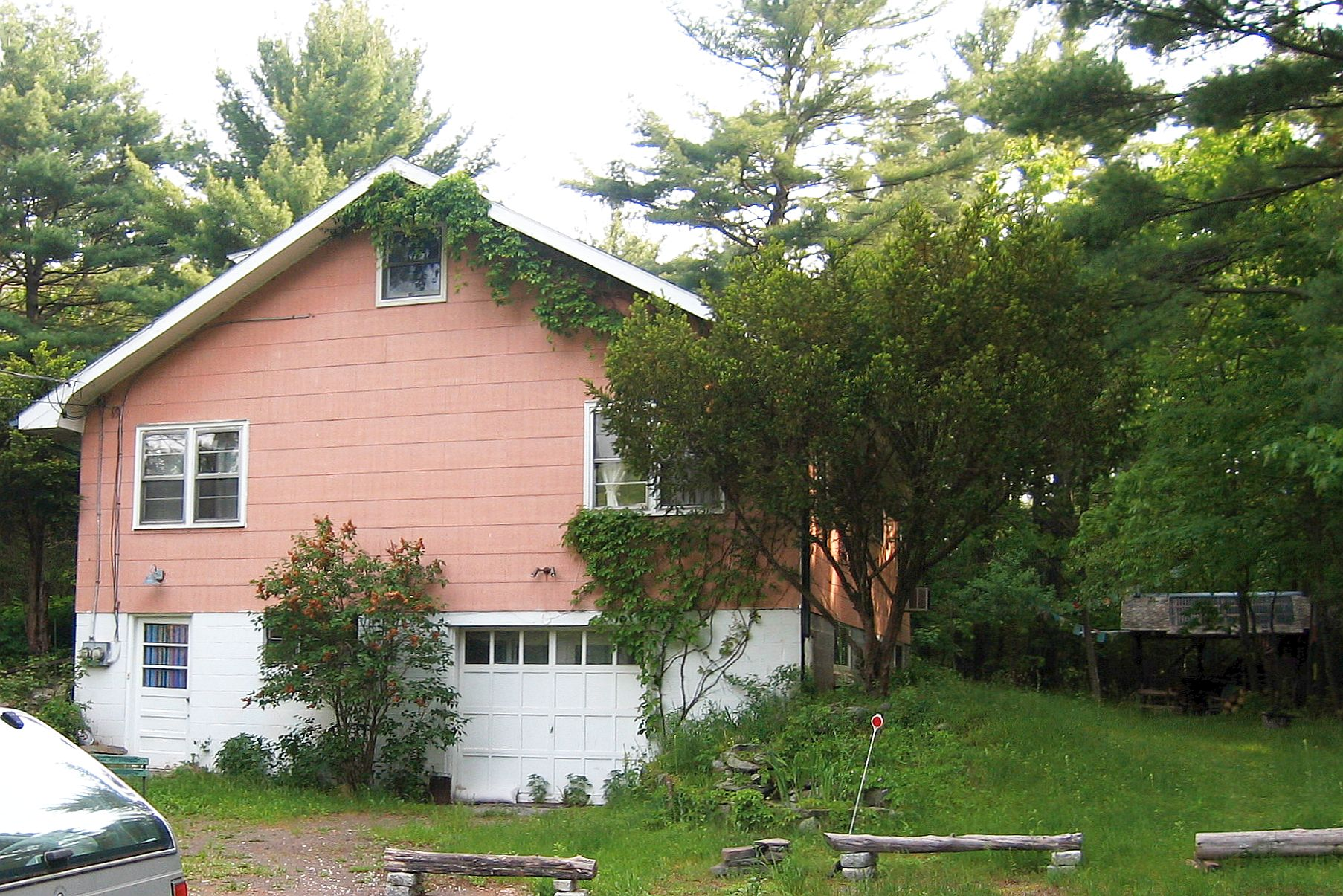
"Big Pink" in 2006

The Band's members included Danko, Manuel, Hudson, guitarist Robbie Robertson and drummer/singer Levon Helm. They began to create their distinctive sound during 1967 when they improvised and recorded with Bob Dylan a huge number of cover songs and original Dylan material in the basement of a pink house in West Saugerties, New York, located at 56 Parnassus Lane (formerly 2188 Stoll Road). The house was built by Ottmar Gramms, who bought the land in 1952. The house was newly built when Rick Danko found it as a rental. Danko moved in along with Garth Hudson and Richard Manuel in February 1967. The house became known locally as "Big Pink" for its pink siding. The house was subsequently sold by Gramms in 1977, and since 1998, it has been a private residence.

Widely bootlegged at the time, initially as Great White Wonder in July 1969, some of the recordings Dylan and the Band made were officially released in 1975 on The Basement Tapes, and then in their totality in 2014 on The Bootleg Series Vol. 11: The Basement Tapes Complete. By the end of 1967, the Band felt it was time to step out of Dylan's shadow and make their own statement.

== Recording ==
The Band's manager Albert Grossman (who was also Dylan's manager) approached Capitol Records to secure a record deal for the group still informally described as "Dylan's backing band". Alan Livingston at Capitol signed the Band, initially under the name the Crackers. Armed with news of a recording deal for the group, they lured Levon Helm back from the oil rigs where he had been working to Woodstock where he took up his crucial position in the Band, singing and playing drums. Helm's return coincided with a ferment of activity in Big Pink as the embryonic Band not only recorded with Dylan but also began to write their own songs.

After meeting with producer John Simon, the Band started to record their debut album in Manhattan at A&R Studios, at 799 7th Avenue in the early months of 1968. The Band recorded "Tears of Rage", "Chest Fever", "We Can Talk", "This Wheel's On Fire" and "The Weight" in two sessions. Robertson has said that when Simon asked them how they wanted it to sound, they replied, "Just like it did in the basement."

Capitol, pleased with the initial recording session, suggested that the group move to Los Angeles to finish recording their first album at Capitol Studios. They also cut some material at Gold Star Studios on Santa Monica Boulevard. The songs on Big Pink recorded in L.A. were "In A Station", "To Kingdom Come", "Lonesome Suzie", "Long Black Veil" and "I Shall Be Released".

== Artwork ==
Dylan offered to sing on the album, but ultimately realized it was important for the Band to make their own statement. Instead, Dylan signified his presence by contributing a cover painting. Barney Hoskyns has written that it is significant the painting depicts six musicians. The cover of Music from Big Pink was intended to establish the group as having a different outlook from the psychedelic culture of 1968. Photographer Elliott Landy flew to Toronto to photograph the assembled Danko, Manuel, Robertson, and Hudson families on the Danko chicken farm. A photo was inserted of Diamond and Nell Helm, who lived in Arkansas. The photo appeared on the cover with the caption "Next of Kin". The overall design of the sleeve is by Milton Glaser (who also did the poster that was packed with the 1967 Bob Dylan's Greatest Hits).

== Reception ==
Professional ratings
Retrospective reviews
Review scores
Source	Rating
AllMusic	5/5 stars
DownBeat	4.5/5 stars
Encyclopedia of Popular Music	5/5 stars
Entertainment Weekly	A
Goldmine	5/5 stars
MusicHound Rock	5/5
Pitchfork	9.4/10
Q	5/5 stars
Rolling Stone	5/5 stars
The Rolling Stone Album Guide	5/5 stars

The initial reception to the album was positive. It received praise for the organic quality of the instrumentation, which had been recorded live without overdubbing. In Rolling Stone, Al Kooper's rave review of Big Pink ended with the words, "This album was recorded in approximately two weeks. There are people who will work their lives away in vain and not touch it." This helped to draw public attention to it (Rolling Stone even referred to them as "the band from Big Pink" instead of just "the Band"). The fact that Bob Dylan wrote one and co-wrote two of the songs on the album also attracted attention. Robert Christgau was less enthusiastic in The Village Voice, crediting the music's original evocation of "country-soul feeling without imitating it" and the "human roughness around the edges", yet stating that he "always admired that album" but "from a distance".

In 1968, "The Weight" peaked at No. 63 on Billboard's Hot 100 singles chart in the US. The song was a bigger hit elsewhere, peaking at No. 35 in Canada, and No. 21 in the UK. The album peaked at No. 18 in Canada and reached No. 30 on Billboard's Pop Albums chart in 1968, and then recharted as a No. 8 hit on the Top Internet Albums chart in 2000. "The Weight" gained widespread popularity from the Band's performance of it at Woodstock on August 17, 1969, and due partially to its inclusion in the film Easy Rider, though it was omitted from the soundtrack because of licensing issues. A cover version by the band Smith was included on the soundtrack album instead.

The laid-back feel of the album attracted the attention of other major artists. For example, Eric Clapton cites the album's roots rock style as what convinced him to quit Cream, and engage Delaney and Bonnie and friends as "Derek and the Dominos" on his debut solo album. George Harrison was also impressed by the album's musicianship and sense of camaraderie, and Roger Waters of Pink Floyd called it the second "most influential record in the history of rock and roll", after the Beatles' Sgt. Pepper's Lonely Hearts Club Band, and said that it "affected Pink Floyd deeply, deeply, deeply". According to Terry Burrows, the album spawned the Americana genre, while music academic Chris Smith said its songs laid the groundwork for roots rock music. The music writer Ian MacDonald called it "...the most influential record of its time – probably the most influential in rock history", citing its influence on the Beatles, Elton John, Traffic, Fairport Convention, the Byrds, the Grateful Dead, Little Feat, and 1970s country rock in general.

Music from Big Pink was voted No. 452 in the third edition of Colin Larkin's All Time Top 1000 Albums (2000). In 2003, it was ranked 34th on Rolling Stone's list of the 500 greatest albums of all time, a ranking it maintained on the magazine's 2012 revised list, before dropping to number 100 in a 2020 revised list. On Metacritic, the expanded 50th anniversary edition of the album has an aggregate score of 99 out of 100, based on seven reviews, a rating that the website defines as indicating "universal acclaim".

== Re-releases ==
The original LP record issue included a gatefold cover in 1968, duplicated 40 years later in 2008 as a remastered 180 gm LP. On compact disc, it was remastered as a gold CD in 1989, as a DVD-audio in 2001 and as a remastered numbered edition SACD in 2009. On August 29, 2000, it was reissued by EMI Records as a standard compact disc with nine bonus tracks. In 2012, Mobile Fidelity released a remastered, numbered, limited edition, Half-speed Mastering from the original master tapes, 180g LP pressed at RTI.

In 2018, a 50th Anniversary Edition was released with an entirely new stereo mix and 5.1 mix by Bob Clearmountain, mastered by Bob Ludwig. It also included some of the additional tracks from the 2000 re-release, and a new vocal-only mix of "I Shall Be Released".

== Track listing ==
=== Original release ===
Side one
No.	Title	Writer(s)	Lead vocal	Length
1.	"Tears of Rage"	Bob Dylan, Richard Manuel	Manuel	5:23
2.	"To Kingdom Come"	Robbie Robertson	Manuel, Robertson	3:22
3.	"In a Station"	Manuel	Manuel	3:34
4.	"Caledonia Mission"	Robertson	Rick Danko	2:59
5.	"The Weight"	Robertson	Levon Helm with Danko	4:34

Side two
No.	Title	Writer(s)	Lead vocal	Length
1.	"We Can Talk"	Manuel	Manuel, Helm, Danko	3:06
2.	"Long Black Veil"	Marijohn Wilkin, Danny Dill	Danko	3:06
3.	"Chest Fever"	Robertson	Manuel	5:18
4.	"Lonesome Suzie"	Manuel	Manuel	4:04
5.	"This Wheel's on Fire"	Dylan, Danko	Danko	3:14
6.	"I Shall Be Released"	Dylan	Manuel	3:19

- Sides one and two were combined as tracks 1–11 on CD reissues.

=== 2000 reissue bonus tracks ===
No.	Title	Writer(s)	Length
12.	"Yazoo Street Scandal"	Robertson	4:02
13.	"Tears Of Rage (Alternate Take)"	Dylan, Manuel	5:32
14.	"Katie's Been Gone"	Manuel, Robertson	2:47
15.	"If I Lose"	Charlie Poole	2:30
16.	"Long Distance Operator"	Dylan	3:58
17.	"Lonesome Suzie (Alternate Take)"	Manuel	3:00
18.	"Orange Juice Blues (Blues For Breakfast)"	Manuel	3:40
19.	"Key To The Highway"	Big Bill Broonzy	2:28
20.	"Ferdinand The Imposter"	Robertson	4:00

== Personnel ==
The Band

- Rick Danko – bass guitar, fiddle, vocals
- Levon Helm – drums, tambourine, vocals
- Garth Hudson – organ, piano, clavinet, soprano and tenor saxophones
- Richard Manuel – piano, organ, vocals
- Robbie Robertson – electric and acoustic guitars, vocals

Additional personnel

- John Simon – producer, baritone horn, tenor saxophone, piano, tambourine
- Don Hahn – engineer
- Tony May – engineer
- Shelly Yakus – engineer
- Bob Dylan – cover painting
- Elliott Landy – photography

2018 remix

- Bob Clearmountain – 2018 Stereo and 5.1 Surround mix
- Bob Ludwig – remastering

== Charts ==
Chart (1968)	Peak position
US Billboard Top LPs	30

== Sources ==
- Hoskyns, Barney (1993). Across The Great Divide: The Band and America. Viking. ISBN 0-670-841447.
- Landy, Elliott (2015). The Band Photographs 1968-1969. Backbeat Books. ISBN 978-1-4950-2251-7.
