= Lonesome Suzie =

Single by The Band

from the album Music from Big Pink
- A-side: "Whispering Pines"
- Released: 1970
- Recorded: Early 1968
- Genre: Rock
- Length: 4:04
- Label: Capitol
- Songwriter: Richard Manuel
- Producer: John Simon

"Lonesome Suzie" is a 1968 song by The Band written and sung by Richard Manuel originally appearing on their influential debut album Music From Big Pink. It was also released on Across The Great Divide, a compilation box set from 1994. Drummer Levon Helm has said that "...Lonesome Suzie was Richard's failed attempt to write a hit record." It never charted and is one of the few songs on which Manuel contributed writing, but is also recognized as one of Manuel's signature pieces. In 1970 it was released as the B-side of the French single release of "Whispering Pines".

== Recording ==
"Lonesome Suzie" was recorded at Capitol Studios and Gold Star Studios.

== Lyrics and music ==
The song is about a lonely spinster. The woman is described as "always losing" and we are told that she "sits and cries and shakes". The singer is left not knowing what to do for her. He feels that the woman can use a friend and although he isn't willing to be that friend, he suggests that maybe he can lend her one of his friends. The singer recognizes that she might get angry at someone who is able to relate to her, and thinks getting angry might be helpful to her. The song ends with the singer acknowledging that watching her is making him feel lonely too, and he suggests "Why don't we get together, what else can we do?"

Music journalist Greil Marcus felt that the singer's recognition of his willingness to lend the spinster a friend, despite not willing to be her friend himself, is what leads to his breakthrough at the end in being able to feel loneliness himself. Music critic Barney Hoskyns interpreted the song as addressing Manuel's own loneliness. Helm described it as "a quiet song that told a story that was typical of Richard's general philosophy, which was to be kind to people."

Manuel sang the lead vocals using his falsetto voice. Garth Hudson plays organ in a church-like manner. According to drummer Levon Helm biographer Sandra B. Tooze, Helms "lags behind [Manuel's vocal], doubling up on the snare in parts, with an almost inaudible hi-hat." Robbie Robertson plays simple guitar licks with a subtle backing by the other members. Some of Robertson's guitar licks follow Manuel's lines in a manner similar to Charlie McCoy's work on Bob Dylan's "Desolation Row". Boston Globe critic Ernie Santosuosso described the song as "a latter-day 'Little Girl Blue'".

== Reception ==
San Francisco Examiner critic Ralph J. Gleason described "Lonesome Suzie" as "as agonizingly personal a tragic story, though in a different way, as 'Eleanor Rigby'". Anderson Independent-Mail editor Mac Thrower gave it as an example of how Manuel "had the distinctive ability to take love songs that most singers would dissolve into schmaltz and turn them into tender personal statements." Douglas Featherling of the Kingston Whig-Standard felt it was one of the least successful songs on Music from Big Pink.

Hoskyns called the song "classic Manuel: sung in his richest falsetto voice, supported by delicate guitar and organ fills, the track dripped with longing and despair, with the tender sympathy only a fellow lonelyheart could possibly muster." The Band FAQ author Peter Aaron called it "a wistful, painfully romantic treasure that hints at what might have been had [Manuel] continued to evolve as a songwriter in the years ahead" and one "of the highest points on an album wall-to-wall with high points." Music professors Allan Moore and Remy Martin described the song as being "no less harmonically elaborate, although it is formally more concise, than the minuet of Mozart's Eine Kleine Nachtmusik."

Helm called it "a miniature portrait that Richard sang in his squeezed-out falsetto." Band guitarist and primary songwriter Robbie Robertson was impressed by how moving the song was.

== Alternate Version ==
The 2000 re-issue of Music From Big Pink includes a version of the song with a faster tempo and more doo wop rhythm.

== Blood, Sweat & Tears version ==
In 1970, it was covered by Blood, Sweat & Tears on their third album Blood, Sweat & Tears 3. Chicago Tribune critic Peter Gorner described this version as reminiscent of the Moody Blues. New York Times critic Don Heckman praised David Clayton-Thomas' "remarkably subtle" vocal performance. Asbury Park Press critic Miriam Bush also praised Clayton-Thomas' vocal performance. Santosuosso said that "Although the brass choir tends to bully him, at times, David's musical discipline sustains him well as he manages some tellingly melodramatic moments."

On the other hand, Blood, Sweat & Tears guitarist Steve Katz dismissed it in his autobiography, saying "You can actually hear David smile. He ruins it. It's pretentious. It's not honest, you can feel it. I hate it so much I haven't listened it in forty years...He just tanks the whole thing, just tosses it off like he's Dean Martin or Robert Goulet or some fucking thing, which is not what we were about, not at all."

== Personnel ==
- Richard Manuel - lead vocal, piano
- Robbie Robertson - electric guitar
- Garth Hudson - Lowrey organ, soprano saxophone
- Levon Helm - drums
- Rick Danko - bass guitar
