= We Can Talk =

Song by The Band

from the album Music from Big Pink
- Released: July 1, 1968
- Recorded: Early 1968
- Genre: Rock
- Length: 3:06
- Label: Capitol
- Songwriter: Richard Manuel
- Producer: John Simon

"We Can Talk" is a 1968 song by The Band that was the opener for the second side of their debut album Music From Big Pink Written by Richard Manuel, it features The Band's three main vocalists (Manuel, Levon Helm and Rick Danko) in nearly equal turns, often finishing each other's phrases. Initially a staple of their concerts (including Woodstock and the Isle of Wight Festival 1969), it was dropped from the set list in 1971.

== Theme ==
"We Can Talk" shows unrelated snippets of conversation between members of The Band. Levon Helm wrote in his autobiography "It's a funny song that really captures the way we spoke to one another; lots of outrageous rhymes and corny puns."

== Personnel ==
- Robbie Robertson - electric guitar
- Garth Hudson - Lowrey organ
- Levon Helm - lead vocal, drums
- Richard Manuel - lead vocal, piano
- Rick Danko - lead vocal, bass guitar
