= Finding Maubee =

1971 detective novel by Albert H. Z. Carr

- Author: Albert H. Z. Carr
- Language: English
- Genre: Detective novel
- Publication date: 1971
- Media type: Print

Finding Maubee (referred to as The Calypso Murders in the UK) is a 1971 detective novel by Albert H. Z. Carr. It is set in a fictional Caribbean island called St. Caro. Finding Maubee earned Carr an Edgar Award in the category of Best First Novel.

The novel was made into a 1989 American film titled The Mighty Quinn, starring Denzel Washington and Robert Townsend.
