= Tears of Rage =

Bob Dylan song

Single by Bob Dylan & the Band

from the album The Basement Tapes
- A-side: "Million Dollar Bash"
- Released: October 17, 1975
- Recorded: 1967
- Genre: Rock
- Length: 4:15
- Label: Columbia
- Composer: Richard Manuel
- Lyricist: Bob Dylan
- Producers: Bob Dylan; The Band

Bob Dylan singles chronology
"Tangled Up in Blue" (1975)	"Tears of Rage" (1975)	"Hurricane" (1975)

"Tears of Rage"

Song by the Band

from the album Music from Big Pink
- Released: July 1, 1968
- Recorded: 1968
- Genre: Rock
- Length: 5:23
- Label: Capitol
- Composer: Richard Manuel
- Lyricist: Bob Dylan
- Producer: John Simon

"Tears of Rage" is a song with lyrics written by Bob Dylan and music by Richard Manuel. Dylan and the Band first recorded the song in 1967, but it was not released until 1975 on The Basement Tapes album. Their recording was also released on October 17, 1975 as the B-side of the single from the album, "Million Dollar Bash". In 1968, the Band recorded it without Dylan for their debut album Music from Big Pink.

== Initial recordings ==
The song was first recorded in rehearsal sessions at the Band's upstate New York residence, Big Pink, in 1967, with Dylan on lead vocal and the Band backing him. These sessions were not officially released until the 1975 double-album The Basement Tapes, although they were widely bootlegged in the late 1960s and early 1970s.

The first official release of the song was as the first track on the Band's debut, 1968 album Music from Big Pink, with Manuel on vocal. According to Levon Helm, "Richard sang one of the best performances of his life."

In a song review for AllMusic, Bill Janovitz compared the two versions: "The Dylan version is a gentle folk-soul reading; he and the Band are still feeling their way through the phrasing and the arrangement. By the time the Band recorded it, they had slowed it down to a passionate, gospel-informed, New Orleans-style lament."

== Lyrics ==
Andy Gill likens the song to King Lear's soliloquy on the blasted heath in Shakespeare's tragedy: "Wracked with bitterness and regret, its narrator reflects upon promises broken and truths ignored, on how greed has poisoned the well of best intentions, and how even daughters can deny their father's wishes." He suggests that Dylan is linking the anguish of Lear's soliloquy to the divisions in American society apparent in 1967, as the Vietnam War escalated: "In its narrowest and most contemporaneous interpretation, the song could be the first to register the pain of betrayal felt by many of America’s Vietnam war veterans ... In a wider interpretation [it] harks back to what anti-war protesters and critics of American materialism in general felt was a more fundamental betrayal of the American Declaration of Independence and the Bill of Rights."

A strong Biblical theme runs through the song, according to Sid Griffin, who also notes that "life is brief" is a recurrent message in the Old Testament books Psalms and Isaiah. As a father, Dylan realizes now that "no broken heart hurts more than the broken heart of a distraught parent." Griffin calls the four minutes of this song "as representative of community, ageless truths and the unbreakable bonds of family as anything in The Band's canon—or anyone else's canon."

Greil Marcus suggests that the "famous beginning"—"We carried you/In our arms/On Independence Day"—evokes a naming ceremony not just for a child but also for a whole nation. He writes that "in Dylan's singing—an ache from deep in the chest, a voice thick with care in the first recording of the song—the song is from the start a sermon and an elegy, a Kaddish."

In an interview promoting the release of The Bootleg Series Vol. 11: The Basement Tapes Complete, Dylan cited the dropping of China's first hydrogen bomb as an impetus for the song.

== In popular culture ==
Gene Clark recorded the song for his White Light album (1971). Hip hop group Public Enemy reference it in their 2007 Dylan tribute song "Long and Whining Road": "Tears of rage left a friend blowing in the wind / But time is God, been back for ten years, and black again".

== Live performances ==
According to his official website, Dylan has played the song 81 times in concert total between 1989 and 2008. He also rehearsed the song for the Rolling Thunder Revue in 1975 but did not play it on the tour proper. A recording of this rehearsal was included on the box set Bob Dylan – The Rolling Thunder Revue: The 1975 Live Recordings in 2019. A live performance from New York City on January 17, 1998, was included on the Japanese EP Not Dark Yet: Dylan Alive Vol. 2, released on April 21, 1999.
