= On the Trail of the Buffalo =

Traditional American folk song

"On the Trail of the Buffalo" (Roud 634), also known as "The Buffalo Skinners" or "The Hills of Mexico", is a traditional American folk song in the western music genre. It tells the story of an 1873 buffalo hunt on the southern plains. According to Fannie Eckstorm, 1873 is correct, as the year that professional buffalo hunters from Dodge City first entered the northern part of the Texas panhandle. It is thought to be based on the song Canaday-I-O.

According to extensive research carried out by Jürgen Kloss in 2010–2012, this song is one of the many variants of John B Freeman's "The Buffalo Song".

== "The Buffalo Skinners" ==
"The Buffalo Skinners" is an American folk song which first appeared in John Lomax's Cowboy Songs, and Other Frontier Ballads in 1910. The song tells of crew of men hired in Jacksboro, Texas to go buffalo hunting north of the Pease River :

T'was in the town of Jacksboro in the spring of seventy-three,
A man by the name of Crego came stepping up to me,
Saying, "How do you do, young fellow, and how would you like to go
And spend one summer pleasantly on the range of the buffalo?"

The song goes through many verses telling a humorous tale of the trials and tribulations they find on the hunt. The next to the last verse tells of how the trip ended:

The season being near over, old Crego he did say
The crowd had been extravagant, was in debt to him that day,—
We coaxed him and we begged him and still it was no go,—
We left old Crego's bones to bleach on the range of the buffalo.

The last verse ends with:

Go home to our wives and sweethearts, tell others not to go,
For God's forsaken the buffalo range and the damned old buffalo.

== "Boggus Creek" ==
Another early variant called "Boggus Creek", collected by W.P. Webb, was first published in 1923. Webb considered it a variant to "The Buffalo Skinners" In "Boggus Creek" a group of cowboys are hired at the now abandoned cowtown at Fort Griffin, Texas, to work cattle in New Mexico:

As I rode in the town of Fort Griffin in the spring of '83
An old Texas cowman came riding up to me,
Saying, "how do you do, young fellow, and how would you like to go
And spend one summer season in the hills of Mexico?"

In this variant, no one is killed but the song ends the same way, except instead of warning others about the "range of the buffalo" it says:

Go home to wives and sweethearts, tell other not to go
To the god-forsaken country of old New Mexico.

== Recordings ==
- Woody Guthrie Recorded his version of "Buffalo Skinners" in 1945. It was first released on Struggle: Asch American Documentary, Vol. 1 (Asch 360, 1946, later Stinson 360, now SFW 40025) and is now also available on various CDs, for example on Buffalo Skinners: The Asch Recordings, Vol. 4 (Folkways SFW 40103) or The Early Years (Tradition FS-204)
- Hermes Nye Texas Folk Songs (1955, Folkways FW 02128)
- Ed McCurdy Songs of the Old West (1956, Elektra EKL 112)
- Raphael Boguslav Songs From A Village Garret (1956, Riverside RLP 12-638)
- John A. Lomax Jr. Sings American Folk Songs (1956, Folkways FW 03508)
- Pete Seeger At first on American Industrial Ballads (1956, Folkways SW 40058) and then on American Favorite Ballads, Vol. 5 (1962, Folkways SW 40154; this is an abbreviated version with five verses, the lyrics are from Lomax' original "Buffalo Skinners", the melody and accompaniment are closer to Woody Guthrie)
- Ramblin' Jack Elliott & Derroll Adams Roll On Buddy (1957, Topic 12T 105)
- Richard Dyer-Bennet Vol. 9 (1960, Dyer-Bennet DB 09000)
- Cisco Houston Sings the Songs of Woody Guthrie (1961, Vanguard VRS 9089) and later on Folk Song and Minstrelsy (1963, Vanguard RL-7624)
- Roscoe Holcomb, The Music of Roscoe Holcomb & Wade Ward (1962, Folkways record)
- Eric Von Schmidt Folk Blues of Eric Von Schmidt (1963, Prestige 7717)
- Carl Sandburg Cowboy Songs and Negro Spirituals (1964, Decca DL 9105)
- Jim Kweskin Relax Your Mind (1965, Vanguard VSD-79188)
- Johnny Cash With the title "New Mexico" (recorded at Sun Records circa 1955, unreleased until 1964)
- Johnny Horton "Out in New Mexico" in his 1965 Album I Can't Forget You
- Bob Dylan Recorded a variant, known as "The Hills of Mexico", along with covers of other Johnny Cash songs, during the Basement Tapes sessions (1967, officially released in 2014)
- Slim Critchlow Cowboy Songs: The Crooked Trail To Holbrook (1969, Arhoolie 479; includes also "John Garner's Trail Herd" and "The Crooked Trail To Holbrooke"; recorded 1957–63)
- John Renbourn Faro Annie (1971)
- Harry Tuft on The Continuing Tradition Volume 1: Ballads (1981, Folk-Legacy Records)
- Mosquito Cupid's Fist (1994)
- Sid Selvidge Twice-Told Tales (1994)
- Rich Lerner Trails and Bridges (1995)
- Ramblin' Jack Elliot South Coast (1995)
- Shakin' Apostles Medicine Show (1997)
- Tim O'Brien (musician) Fiddler's Green (2005)
- Gob Iron Death Songs for the Living (2006)
- Ricky Skaggs & Bruce Hornsby (2007)
- Willie Watson "Mexican Cowboy" on Folk Singer Vol. 1 (2014)
- Charlie Marks (musician) Honey Baby (2020)

== Cultural references ==
The song is quoted by Fermilab News, in an article describing the nuclear research facility's herd of American bison.

== See also ==
- Cowman (profession)

== Bibliography ==
- Carr, Joe; Alan Munde. Prairie Nights to Neon Lights: The Story of Country Music in West Texas. Lubbock, TX: Texas Tech University Press (1996).
- Kloss, Jürgen. "On The Trail Of The "Buffalo Skinners"". ....Just Another Tune: Songs & Their History, 2010-2012. Retrieved on 4 August 2014.
- Lomax, John A., M.A. (1918) [1st pub. 1910. New York: Sturgis & Walton]. Cowboy Songs and Other Frontier Ballads (6th printing ed.). New York: The MacMillan Company.
- Waltz, Robert B; David G. Engle. ""Boggy Creek" or "The Hills of Mexico" ". The Traditional Ballad Index: An Annotated Bibliography of the Folk Songs of the English-Speaking World. Hosted by California State University, Fresno, Folklore, 2007.
- Waltz, Robert B; David G. Engle. "The Buffalo Skinners ". The Traditional Ballad Index: An Annotated Bibliography of the Folk Songs of the English-Speaking World. Hosted by California State University, Fresno, Folklore, 2007.
- Webb, W.P. "Miscellany of Texas Folk-LOre" Coffee in the Gourd, pp. 47–63, J. Frank Dobie (ed.). Austin: Texas Folklore Society (1923).
