= See That My Grave Is Kept Clean =

Single by Blind Lemon Jefferson
- B-side: "Where Shall I Be"
- Released: 1927 & 1928
- Recorded: October 1927 & February 1928
- Genre: Blues
- Length: 2:54
- Label: Paramount
- Songwriter: Blind Lemon Jefferson

"See That My Grave Is Kept Clean" (also known as "One Kind Favor") is a song recorded by American blues musician Blind Lemon Jefferson in two slightly differing versions in October 1927 and February 1928, that became "one of his most famous compositions". Son House used the melody on his 1930 recording of "Mississippi County Farm Blues".

== Versions ==
Bob Dylan recorded the song for his 1962 debut album Bob Dylan. He recorded it again with the Band, which is included on The Basement Tapes.

Other artists to cover the song include B.B. King, Peter, Paul and Mary (as "One Kind Favor"), Lightnin' Hopkins (as "One Kind Favor"), Canned Heat (as "One Kind Favor" on Living the Blues), the Grateful Dead (as "One Kind Favor"), Mike Bloomfield, Keiji Haino, Diamanda Galás, Meindert Talma & the Negroes, Laibach, Lou Reed, Furry Lewis, Chrome Cranks, the Dream Syndicate, Dave Van Ronk, Hobart Smith, Mavis Staples, Martin Simpson, Thelonious Monster, Peter Parcek, Laibach and Widespread Panic. Staples' version of the song from her 2015 album Your Good Fortune won the 2016 Grammy Award for Best American Roots Performance.

Pat Donohue performed this song as "One Kind Favor" live on Garrison Keillor's A Prairie Home Companion. It was later released on Donohue's CD, Radio Blues.

The British band Half Man Half Biscuit recorded a parody titled "See That My Bike's Kept Clean" on their 1997 album, Voyage to the Bottom of the Road.

On August 4, 2017, the American Jam/Rock band Phish performed this song to open night 11 of their 13 night residency at Madison Square Garden named the Bakers Dozen. Each show was donut themed, with night 11 being "lemon donut" night.
