= Great White Wonder =

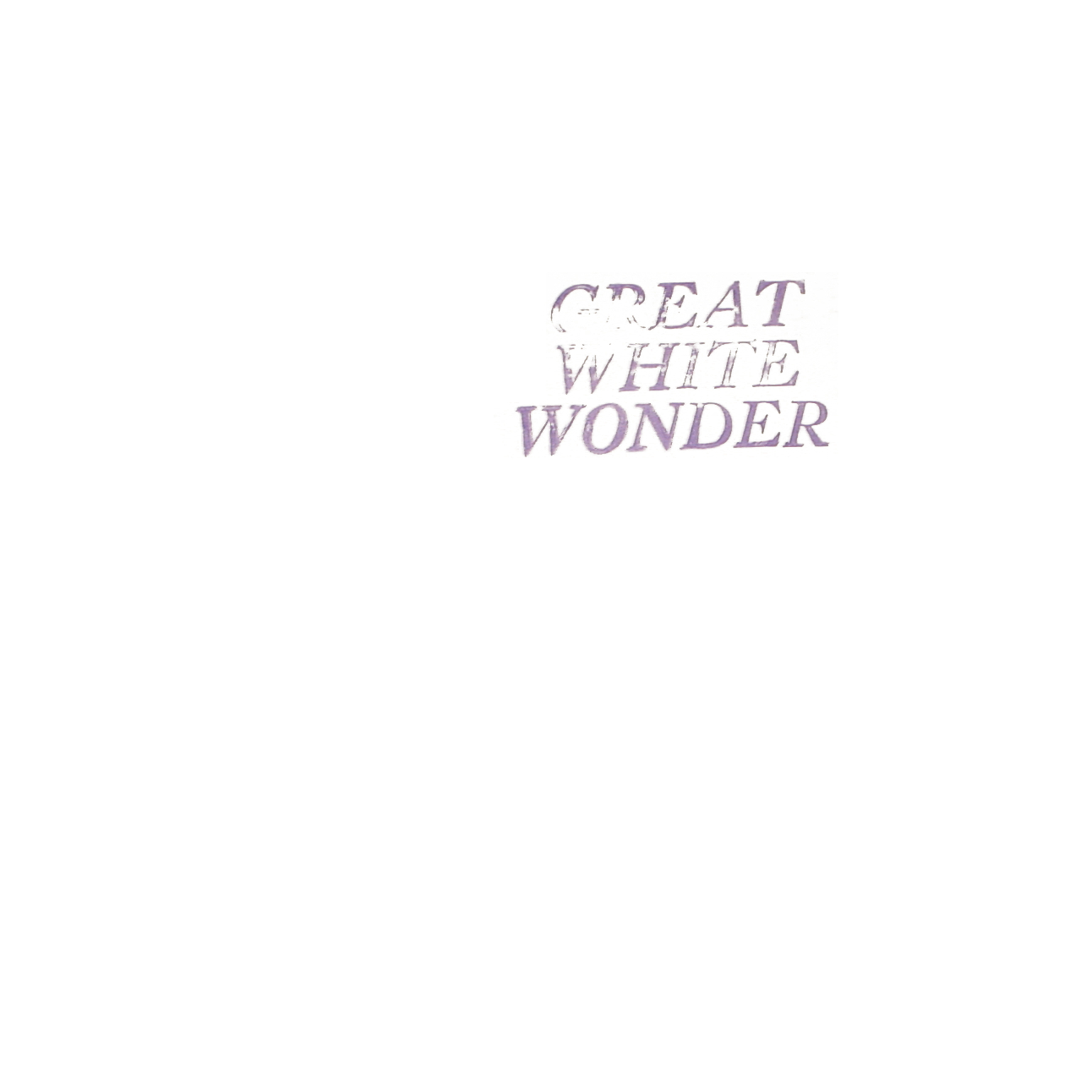

Compilation album (bootleg) by Bob Dylan
- Released: c. July 1969
- Recorded: 1961–1969
- Venue: Various locations
- Genres: Folk; folk rock; rock; blues
- Label: Trademark of Quality

Great White Wonder, or GWW, is a rock bootleg album produced by Ken Douglas and Michael "Dub" Taylor, containing unofficially released recordings by Bob Dylan. Released around July 1969, (Note: It is unclear when the first copies were pressed. Taylor later recalled playing the album on the KRLA radio station, an event he said "probably" happened in July 1969. Periodicals in Texas and London reported on the album's sale in late August.) it is the first notable rock bootleg, and specifically the first release from bootleg record label Trademark of Quality (or TMOQ). Seven of the twenty-four tracks presented here were recorded with The Band in the summer of 1967 in West Saugerties, New York, during the informal sessions that were later released in a more complete form in Dylan's 1975 album The Basement Tapes. Much of the other material consists of a recording (of ten tracks) made in December 1961 in a Minnesota hotel room (referred to as the "Minnesota hotel tape"), studio outtakes from several of Dylan's albums, and a live performance on The Johnny Cash Show. It was the first time that these previously unreleased recordings came to the market; many more would be released in similar formats over the coming years, though most were single albums, not double albums like this record.

The album was nicknamed the "great white wonder" due to the original pressing's plain white gatefold cover. This name—or variations, such as "white wonder", "little white wonder"—would surface in later bootleg releases or in the initials "G.W.W." that were printed on record labels or covers.

== Content ==
Released by the infant Trademark of Quality label, created by two Los Angeles-based men, Ken and Dub, Great White Wonder was compiled from multiple sources: an informal ninety-minute tape that Dylan recorded in the apartment of Bonnie Beecher in Minneapolis in December 1961, a radio broadcast in 1962, studio outtakes, the famous Basement Tapes sessions and a TV appearance. It was the seven "basement-tape" cuts that aroused the greatest interest.

== Radio broadcasts ==
"The west coast radio stations were first to pick up on Great White Wonder. Five radio stations—KCSB-FM in Santa Barbara, KNAC in Long Beach, KRLA in Pasadena and KMET-FM and KPPC-FM in Los Angeles—immediately began playing the album. KRLA was the first. Unconcerned with legal niceties, these LA radio stations were quite willing to fuel demand for both Great White Wonder and the spate of bootlegs that soon followed its metal-stamped heels."

Said Dub, quoted in Clinton Heylin's Bootleg: The Secret History of the Other Recording Industry, "Great White Wonder was just this phenomenon. All of a sudden we just started having fistfuls of money. We didn't realize what we had gotten into." The success of this first bootleg may have prompted others to create illicit albums as well, including The Beatles' Kum Back, released later in 1969, and copies of the original album, released by different labels. However, each time the content was copied, there was a reduction in sound quality.

== Cover and label ==
Originally, the cover was a simple white sleeve, until the nickname "Great White Wonder" began to take effect. The discs had no matrix numbers in the runout grooves. The first batch went to record stores with the blank sleeve, but the next batch from the same first pressing was sent to stores with the name stamped on the front. The stamp came in three color variations: red, purple, or blue. Later 1970s pressings included a poorly hand-stamped title, or a picture of Dylan playing at the Isle of Wight Festival. Others gave the false artist name "Dupre and his Miracle Sound" (cf. genuine group Simon Dupree and the Big Sound), along with false track titles.

== Counterfeit copies ==
The first pirate copy appeared in September 1969. This inferior version can be identified by matrix numbers GF-001, GF-002, GF-003, GF-004 in the runout grooves. The GF stood for Gerald Feldman, an alias of Norty Beckman, who used a tape copy of the original Great White Wonder to make a counterfeit of lesser audio quality.

== Hoax follow-up ==
The Great White Wonder sparked a fake bootleg recording that began as a gag by editors at Rolling Stone magazine. The album, The Masked Marauders, was supposedly recorded during a jam session between Dylan, Mick Jagger, John Lennon, Paul McCartney and George Harrison. A review of the non-existent album ran in Rolling Stone on October 18, 1969. The write-up sparked enough inquiries from readers that a band was hired to record first some singles, then a full album. Released in November 1969 by a Warner Bros. subsidiary created for the stunt, The Masked Marauders topped 100,000 in sales. The album and singles were later re-issued by Rhino Records as a limited edition CD, The Masked Marauders – The Complete Deity Recordings.

== Track listing ==
Track listing as per original 1969 release. All tracks written by Bob Dylan, except when noted.

Side one

1. "Baby, Please Don't Go" (Big Joe Williams) Bonnie Beecher's apartment, 12–22–61
2. Interview by Pete Seeger WBAI-FM, NYC, 5-62
3. "Dink's Song" (traditional) Bonnie Beecher's apartment, 12–22–61
4. "See That My Grave Is Kept Clean" (Blind Lemon Jefferson) Bonnie Beecher's apartment, 12–22–61
5. "East Orange New Jersey" Bonnie Beecher's apartment, 12–22–61
6. "Man of Constant Sorrow" (traditional) Bonnie Beecher's apartment, 12–22–61

Side two

1. "I Shall Be Released Basement Tapes 10-67"
2. "Open the Door, Homer" (take 1) Basement Tapes, 10–67
3. "Too Much of Nothing" (take 2) Basement Tapes, 10–67
4. "Nothing Was Delivered" (take 1) Basement Tapes, 10–67
5. "Tears of Rage" (take 2) Basement Tapes, 10–67
6. "Living the Blues" (Live, The Johnny Cash Show) The Johnny Cash TV Show, 5–1–69

Side three

1. "Candy Man" Bonnie Beecher's apartment, 12–22–61
2. "(As I Go) Ramblin' 'Round" (Woody Guthrie) Bonnie Beecher's apartment, 12–22–61
3. "Black Cross" (Joseph S. Newman / Lord Buckley) Bonnie Beecher's apartment, 12–22–61
4. "I Ain't Got No Home" (Woody Guthrie) Bonnie Beecher's apartment, 12–22–61
5. "The Death of Emmett Till" WBAI-FM, NYC, 5-62
6. "Poor Lazarus" (traditional) Bonnie Beecher's apartment, 12–22–61

Side four

1. "Bob Dylan's New Orleans Rag" studio outtake
2. "If You Gotta Go, Go Now (Or Else You Got to Stay All Night)" studio outtake
3. "Only a Hobo" studio outtake
4. "Sitting On a Barbed Wire Fence" studio outtake
5. "Mighty Quinn" (take 1) Basement Tapes, 10–67
6. "This Wheel's on Fire" (Bob Dylan and Rick Danko) Basement Tapes, 10–67

== Great White Wonder II ==
In 1970, TMQ released another version of Great White Wonder, entitled Great White Wonder II. Many of the tracks were lifted from the Stealin' and John Birch Society Blues bootlegs, and seven more tracks from the "Basement Tapes" were featured. However, each track was pressed from a unique source tape, not copied directly from the original LP. This resulted in a rather high-quality release, in terms of sound.

All songs written by Bob Dylan, except when noted.

Side one

1. "Can You Please Crawl Out Your Window"
2. "It Takes a Lot to Laugh, It Takes a Train to Cry"
3. "Love Minus Zero/No Limit"
4. "She Belongs to Me"
5. "It's All Over Now, Baby Blue"
6. "That's All Right (Mama)" (Arthur Crudup)
7. "Hard Times In New York Town"
8. "Stealin'" (traditional, arranged Memphis Jug Band)

Side two

9. "I Was Young When I Left Home" (traditional)
10. "Percy's Song" (take 2)
11. "Corrina, Corrina" (traditional)
12. "In the Evening"
13. "Long John" (traditional)
14. "Crash on the Levee (Down in the Flood)"

Side three

15. "Wade in the Water" (traditional)
16. "Cocaine Blues" (traditional, arranged Reverend Gary Davis)
17. "I'll Keep It With Mine"
18. "Talkin' John Birch Paranoid Blues"
19. "Who Killed Davey Moore?"
20. "Eternal Circle"
21. "Rambling, Gambling Willie"

Side four

22. "Million Dollar Bash"
23. "Yea! Heavy and a Bottle of Bread"
24. "Please, Mrs. Henry"
25. "Lo and Behold"
26. "Tiny Montgomery"
27. "You Ain't Goin' Nowhere"
28. "Mixed-Up Confusion"
29. "East Laredo Blues"
