= I Shall Be Released =

1967 song by Bob Dylan

Song by the Band

from the album Music from Big Pink
- Released: July 1, 1968
- Genre: Roots rock
- Length: 3:19
- Label: Capitol
- Songwriter: Bob Dylan
- Producer: John Simon

"I Shall Be Released"

Song by Bob Dylan

from the album Bob Dylan's Greatest Hits Vol. II
- Released: November 17, 1971
- Recorded: September 24, 1971
- Genre: Folk rock; gospel blues
- Length: 3:03
- Songwriter: Bob Dylan
- Producer: Leon Russell

"I Shall Be Released"

Single by the Heptones
- Released: 1969
- Recorded: 1969
- Genre: Reggae
- Label: Coxsone/Studio One
- Songwriter: Bob Dylan
- Producer: C.S. Dodd

"I Shall Be Released" is a 1967 song written by Bob Dylan.

Dylan recorded two primary versions. The first recording was made in collaboration with the Band during the Basement Tapes sessions in 1967, and released on The Bootleg Series Volumes 1–3 in 1991. A remixed version of the 1967 recording was rereleased with a preliminary take on The Bootleg Series Vol. 11: The Basement Tapes Complete in 2014. Of the initial demo, Rolling Stone's Jann Wenner said, "the music in this song and the high pleading sound of Dylan's voice reminds one of the Bee Gees."

The earliest official release of the song was by English musician Boz Burrell under the name Boz, whose version was released as a single on May 3, 1968, on Columbia. The Band recorded their version of the song for their debut album Music from Big Pink, released two months later in July 1968, with Richard Manuel singing lead vocals, and Rick Danko and Levon Helm harmonizing on the chorus. The song was also performed near the end of the Band's 1976 farewell concert, The Last Waltz, in which all the night's performers except Muddy Waters, plus Ringo Starr and Ronnie Wood, appeared on the same stage. Additional live recordings by the Band were included on the 1974 concert album Before the Flood and the 2001 expanded CD reissue of Rock of Ages.

In 1971, Dylan recorded the song a second time with a different arrangement and altered lyrics. He was accompanied by Happy Traum and the song was released on Bob Dylan's Greatest Hits Vol. II.

== Style and content ==
The song is influenced by gospel music, combining images of religious redemption with implied literal release from prison. David Yaffe described the song as a song about redeemed prisoners. The song describes life behind a wall, hearing a man who "swears he's not to blame" and is "crying out that he was framed". While the narrator reflects on "every man who put me here", and says that "any day now I shall be released".

Author Mike Marqusee observed that the cruelty of the justice system is a recurring theme in Bob Dylan's work, but that Dylan broadens the idea of imprisonment to social issues with an urge for freedom. Clinton Heylin writes in his book Revolution In The Air:

Prisons of the body and the mind seem to have preyed on Dylan's mind throughout his time spent with the boys on retainer. Among the songs recorded at early basement sessions were covers of "Folsom Prison Blues" and "The Banks of the Royal Canal" (the latter is particularly affecting), both songs written—metaphorically—from inside prison walls. Dylan then takes a leaf from Johnny Cash and Brendan Behan (brother of Dominic Behan), authors of those earlier songs, by writing his own prison song, "I Shall Be Released." He is characteristically careful not to confuse simplicity of construction with a commensurate simplicity of meaning. The release that he is singing about—and that Richard Manuel echoes—is not from mere prison bars but rather from the cage of physical existence, the same cage that corrodes on "Visions of Johanna".

== Reception ==
Rolling Stone magazine ranked "I Shall Be Released" 6th on a list of the "100 Greatest Bob Dylan Songs". An article accompanying the list calls it a "simple, evocative tale of a prisoner yearning for freedom" and a "rock hymn [that] was part of a conscious effort by Dylan to move away from the sprawling imagery of his mid-Sixties masterpieces". It also describes the original Basement Tapes version thusly: "The rough church of the organ and guitar frame Dylan's urgent nasal prayer, until Richard Manuel's keening harmony illuminates the chorus, like sunlight pouring through a stained-glass window".

== Live performances ==
According to his website, Dylan performed the song 491 times in concert between its live debut in 1975 and 2008, followed by a long hiatus before being played as the final song of the June 9, 2026 show at the Cuthbert Amphitheater, Eugene, Oregon. It has been common for Dylan to perform it as a duet with touring partners or musical artists he is sharing a bill with. This has been the case with, among others, Willie Nelson, Norah Jones, Elvis Costello, Joni Mitchell, Van Morrison, The Band, Jerry Garcia Band and Amos Lee.

In 1999, Sarah McLachlan and a variety of other artists sang it together several times and as the closing number at Lilith Fair. This version was recorded and shown in the 2025 film Lilith Fair: Building a Mystery.

== Notable covers ==
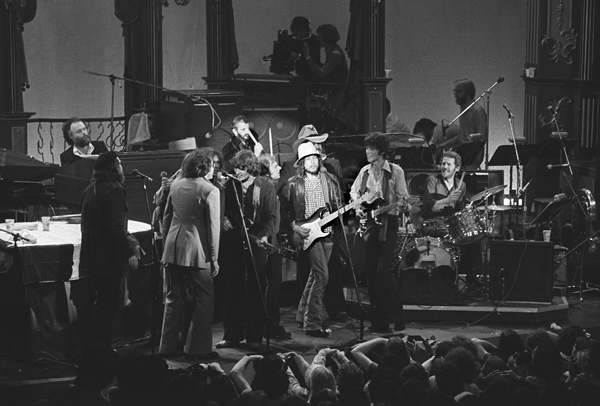
Photograph of The Last Waltz. The Band with Bob Dylan and other guests performing I Shall Be Released. seated behind instruments: Garth Hudson (organ), Ringo Starr (drums), Levon Helm (drums) standing: Dr. John, Neil Diamond, Joni Mitchell (hidden), Neil Young, Rick Danko (Bass), Van Morrison, Bob Dylan (guitar), Ronnie Hawkins, Robbie Robertson (guitar) not shown: Richard Manuel, Eric Clapton, Ron Wood

After the release of the Boz Burrell and the Band versions, "I Shall Be Released" has been recorded by Joni Mitchell, the Youngbloods, the Earl Scruggs Revue, Jeff Buckley, the Marmalade, Joan Baez, Peter, Paul and Mary, Sun Araw, Joe Cocker, Tremeloes, Bette Midler, the Box Tops, the Byrds, Ricky Nelson, Aaron Neville, Melissa Etheridge, Coheed and Cambria, Tom Robinson Band, Nina Simone, The Slackers, Paul Weller, Jerry Garcia Band, Sting, the Heptones, the Hollies, Trinitones, Pearls Before Swine, OK Go, Beth Rowley, Big Mama Thornton, Chatham County Line, the Flying Burrito Brothers, Jack Johnson, Gov't Mule, Martin Harley, Kiosk, James Blundell, Miriam Makeba, Mahotella Queens, Jacob Miller, Bobby McFerrin, Black Oak Arkansas, Marion Williams, Red Dogs, Lera Lynn, Wilco, Lisa Loeb, Zac Brown Band, Kesha, Half Moon Run, Greta Van Fleet, Hideki Saijo, Michael McDonald, Grace Potter, Chrissie Hynde and Elvis Presley. On 2 January 1969, the Beatles jammed the song during their Get Back / Let It Be recording sessions.

Nitty Gritty Dirt Band recorded a version of the song featuring Larkin Poe off their 2022 album Dirt Does Dylan.

== Personnel on the Band version ==
Credits are adapted from the liner notes of A Musical History.

- Richard Manuel – lead vocals, piano
- Rick Danko – bass guitar, backing vocals
- Levon Helm – drums, backing vocals
- Garth Hudson – Lowrey organ
- Robbie Robertson – acoustic guitar

== Published print ==
- Lyrics: 1962–2001, Simon & Schuster, page 303
- Rise Up Singing, Hal Leonard Books, page 102
