= West Saugerties, New York =

- hamlet
- Location of West Saugerties in New York
- Coordinates: 42°06′45″N 74°02′53″W
- Country: United States
- State: New York
- County: Ulster
- Town: Saugerties
- Elevation: 607 ft (185 m)
- Time zone: UTC-5 (Eastern (EST))
  - Summer (DST): UTC-4 (EDT)
- ZIP code: 12477
- Area code: 845
- FIPS code: 36-36111
- GNIS feature ID: 970859

West Saugerties is a hamlet in Ulster County, New York, United States, and part of the town of Saugerties.

West Saugerties is located at 42°06′45″N 74°02′53″W (42.112590, -74.048193). It lies 607 feet (185 m) above sea level.

== History ==
There is evidence in West Saugerties of what appears to be an early 20th-century logging industry, as well as some light quarrying. There are several sections of the Plattekill Creek where carved stonework still exists that would support one or both of these activities. There are also remains of a broken dam referred to as “Carn’s Dam”, likely owned by Jacob Carn, and behind which logs would have been retained; there also stands the remains of a stone structure which may have been a milling facility. This area also later served as the source of ice for an ice delivery business run by the Vickery family.

During the period after World War II, West Saugerties was a popular summer retreat for New York City police officers, firefighters and their families. The police officers in particular were drawn to West Saugerties partly due to its proximity to the Police Camp at the top of Platte Clove. Largely of Irish descent, the policemen and firemen’s families would spend the summer in unheated open-air bungalows, while the men worked in the city. They would join their families on weekends and during week-long vacation periods. By the 1980s, most of these bungalows had been converted into year-long residences, many occupied by members of the same families who lived in them as bungalows.

Summers in post-war West Saugerties were lively. The principal social center was the “Pinewood House”, a boarding house/bar/restaurant on West Saugerties Road operated by the Wood family. Although open year-round, its proximity to the Plattekill Creek and a large swimming hole not accessible by car (referred to as “Daley’s”, “The Big Pool” or “The Big Hole”) made it a popular destination for both year-round and summer residents. A smaller swimming area downstream (“The Little Pool”) was more accessible by car from Burnett Road. The Wood family sold the Pinewood House in 1970. It remained a tavern into the early 1980s, then became a convenience store.

Another gathering place located on the “South Road” or West Saugerties-Woodstock Road, was the Ridge Runners Rod and Gun Club clubhouse. A group of outdoorsmen who frequented the Pinewood House acquired several acres in the late 1950s, and built the clubhouse with volunteer labor, finishing in 1962. The building served as a meeting house, dance hall and catering facility, while the grounds offered picnicking, softball, horseshoes and skeet shooting. The Ridge Runners disbanded in the mid-1980s and the property was sold.

Other recreation in West Saugerties included The Barn, a dance hall on West Saugerties Road featuring live music, and a working farm operated by the Bach family, who hosted fishing, horseback riding and picnic outings. Several Bach family descendants continue to live on and near the family farm.

Summer Sunday mornings in West Saugerties would find most of the summer residents (as well as some year-round residents) walking to 10:00 mass at Our Lady of the Mountain Roman Catholic chapel. The local parish, Saint John the Evangelist, operated this and two other summer chapels (in Quarryville and Fish Creek), in order to serve the summer residents from New York City. The parish priest was usually assisted in the summers by a young newly ordained priest just beginning his vocation. All three outlying properties were sold in the 1970s to help fund a new church building in Centerville.

In February 1967, Rick Danko, Richard Manuel and Garth Hudson moved into a house in West Saugerties nicknamed Big Pink on Stoll Road. These musicians, when joined by Robbie Robertson and Levon Helm, would subsequently become famous as The Band. In Big Pink, they recorded around a hundred songs with Bob Dylan from June to October 1967, and a selection of these recordings were released in 1975 on the album The Basement Tapes. In addition, rehearsals and songwriting for The Band's debut album, Music from Big Pink, were done at Big Pink, although the album was recorded in New York and Los Angeles.
