= Greatest Hits (The Band album) =

Greatest hits album by the Band
- Released: September 26, 2000
- Recorded: Early 1968 – Early 1977
- Genre: Rock
- Length: 77:00
- Label: Capitol
- Producer: John Simon and the Band

The Band chronology
| The Best of the Band, Vol. II (1999) | Greatest Hits (2000) | The Last Waltz (2002) |

Professional ratings
Review scores
| Source | Rating |
|---|---|
| AllMusic | 4.5/5 stars |

Greatest Hits is a compilation album by the Canadian-American rock group the Band. It was released in 2000 on Capitol Records. The album was released in conjunction with remastered versions of the group's first four albums. It draws very heavily from these records, with thirteen of the eighteen tracks selected from Music from Big Pink, The Band, Stage Fright and Cahoots.

== Track listing ==
All tracks composed by Robbie Robertson unless otherwise noted.

| No. | Title | Original album | Length |
|---|---|---|---|
| 1. | "The Weight" | Music from Big Pink, 1968 | 4:35 |
| 2. | "Tears of Rage" (Bob Dylan, Richard Manuel) | Music from Big Pink | 5:19 |
| 3. | "Chest Fever" | Music from Big Pink | 5:13 |
| 4. | "I Shall Be Released" (Dylan) | Music from Big Pink | 3:12 |
| 5. | "Up on Cripple Creek" | The Band, 1969 | 4:31 |
| 6. | "The Night They Drove Old Dixie Down" | The Band | 3:32 |
| 7. | "Rag Mama Rag" | The Band | 3:02 |
| 8. | "King Harvest (Has Surely Come)" | The Band | 3:38 |
| 9. | "The Shape I'm In" | Stage Fright, 1970 | 4:01 |
| 10. | "Stage Fright" | Stage Fright | 3:41 |
| 11. | "Time to Kill" | Stage Fright | 3:26 |
| 12. | "Life Is a Carnival" (Rick Danko, Levon Helm, Robbie Robertson) | Cahoots, 1971 | 3:57 |
| 13. | "When I Paint My Masterpiece" (Dylan) | Cahoots | 4:18 |
| 14. | "Ain't Got No Home" (Clarence "Frogman" Henry) | Moondog Matinee, 1973 | 3:24 |
| 15. | "It Makes No Difference" | Northern Lights – Southern Cross, 1975 | 6:32 |
| 16. | "Ophelia" | Northern Lights – Southern Cross | 3:31 |
| 17. | "Acadian Driftwood" | Northern Lights – Southern Cross | 6:41 |
| 18. | "The Saga of Pepote Rouge" | Islands, 1977 | 4:14 |

== Group members and other participants ==
- The Band – producers (9–18)
- Rick Danko – bass, fiddle, vocals
- Levon Helm – drums, mandolin, rhythm guitar, bass, tambourine, vocals
- Garth Hudson – organ, piano, clavinet, synthesizers, accordion, wind instruments, bagpipe chanter, bass pedals
- Richard Manuel – piano, clavinet, organ, drums, harmonica, vocals
- Robbie Robertson – guitars
- John Simon – producer (1–8), tenor saxophone (2), baritone saxophone (3), tuba (7), electric piano (8)
- Allen Toussaint – horn arrangement (12)
- Billy Mundi – drums (14)
- Byron Berline – fiddle (17)
- See individual albums for engineering credits.

== Charts ==
2009 chart performance for Greatest Hits
| Chart (2009) | Peak position |
|---|---|
| US Top Catalog Albums (Billboard) | 13 |

2012 chart performance for Greatest Hits
| Chart (2012) | Peak position |
|---|---|
| Canadian Albums (Nielsen SoundScan) | 83 |
| US Billboard 200 | 83 |
