= Anthology (The Band album) =

Greatest hits album by the Band
- Released: 1978
- Recorded: 1968–77
- Genre: Rock
- Length: 84:10
- Label: Capitol

The Band chronology
Islands (1977)	Anthology (1978)	The Last Waltz (1978)

Professional ratings
Review scores
Source	Rating
AllMusic	3/5 stars
Christgau's Record Guide	B−

Anthology is a 2-LP and double-play cassette tape greatest hits compilation by the Canadian-American rock group the Band, released in 1978. In 1980, the set was re-released as two separate albums and cassette tapes, Anthology Volume 1 and Anthology Volume 2. In 1988, it was reissued on CD, again in two separate volumes.

== Track listing ==
All tracks are written by Robbie Robertson except where noted.

Side one
No.	Title	Writer(s)	Original album	Length
1.	"The Weight"		Music from Big Pink (1968)	4:38
2.	"Chest Fever"		Music from Big Pink	5:18
3.	"I Shall Be Released"	Bob Dylan	Music from Big Pink	3:19
4.	"Rag Mama Rag"		The Band (1969)	3:04
5.	"The Night They Drove Old Dixie Down"		The Band	3:33

Side two
No.	Title	Original album	Length
1.	"Up on Cripple Creek"	The Band	4:34
2.	"King Harvest (Has Surely Come)"	The Band	3:39
3.	"Stage Fright"	Stage Fright (1970)	3:43
4.	"The Shape I'm In"	Stage Fright	4:00
5.	"Daniel and the Sacred Harp"	Stage Fright	4:06

Side three
No.	Title	Writer(s)	Original album	Length
1.	"Life Is a Carnival"	Robertson; Levon Helm; Rick Danko	Cahoots (1971)	3:55
2.	"When I Paint My Masterpiece"	Dylan	Cahoots	4:21
3.	"This Wheel's on Fire"	Dylan; Danko	Rock of Ages (1972); originally from Music from Big Pink	4:07
4.	"The Great Pretender"	Buck Ram	Moondog Matinee (1973)	3:07
5.	"Mystery Train"	H. Parker, Jr.; Sam Phillips; additional lyrics by Robertson	Moondog Matinee	5:35

Side four
No.	Title	Original album	Length
1.	"Ophelia"	Northern Lights – Southern Cross (1975)	3:32
2.	"It Makes No Difference"	Northern Lights – Southern Cross	6:34
3.	"Acadian Driftwood"	Northern Lights – Southern Cross	6:42
4.	"Right as Rain"	Islands (1977)	3:52
5.	"Livin' in a Dream"	Islands	2:52
