= Sleeping (The Band song) =

Song by The Band

from the album Stage Fright
- Released: August 17, 1970
- Genre: Rock
- Length: 3:10
- Label: Capitol
- Songwriter(s): Richard Manuel, Robbie Robertson
- Producer(s): The Band

"Sleeping" is a song by The Band, first released on their 1970 album Stage Fright. It was also released as the B-side to the "Stage Fright" single. It was co-written by Robbie Robertson and Richard Manuel. This and “Just Another Whistle Stop” are the only two songs Manuel receives credit for on the album. Music critic Barney Hoskyns rates it as "one of Richard [Manuel's] liveliest performances" and "one of The Band's most intricate arrangements." The Band never featured the song on a live album.

The song features Manuel on lead vocals and the piano, Rick Danko on backing vocals and bass, Levon Helm on drums, Robertson on electric guitar, and Garth Hudson on the Lowrey organ and accordion.

"Sleeping" uses a waltz time signature. Following the style of “King Harvest (Has Surely Come),” the song has no true chorus. Instead, the verses that are sung softly are given greater importance. However, Robertson’s guitar solo comes in the middle of the song, rather than the end. Hoskyns rates this solo, played along with Hudson's "pitch-bending" organ, as "one of the most ecstatic passages on any Band record.

Lyrically, the song is rather simple. According to music critic Nick DeRiso, the lyrics move from "a lament about 'the life we chose'" to "a confusingly lonesome period of guessing and searching." Manuel and Robertson dramatize how sleeping provides man with a necessary escape from the hustle of life. This motif can be traced back to “When You Awake,” another song co-written by Manuel and Robertson just a year earlier and released on the self-titled The Band album. The emotion of the song ranges between melancholy and "blissful escapism." Both DeRiso and Hoskyns see "Sleeping" as something of a sequel to the emotional mood from earlier Manuel-penned Band songs "In a Station" (from Music from Big Pink) and "Whispering Pines" (from The Band).

The song is featured in a karaoke scene in Rian Johnson's The Brothers Bloom (2008), sung by Rinko Kikuchi.

== Personnel ==
- Rick Danko – bass guitar, backing vocals
- Levon Helm – drums
- Garth Hudson – organ, accordion
- Richard Manuel – piano, lead vocals
- Robbie Robertson – guitar
