= The Best of the Band =

Greatest hits album by the Band
- Released: July 15, 1976
- Recorded: Early 1968 – Mid 1975
- Genre: Rock
- Length: 47:34
- Label: Capitol
- Producer: The Band, John Simon

The Band chronology
Northern Lights – Southern Cross (1975)	The Best of the Band (1976)	Islands (1977)

Professional ratings
Review scores
Source	Rating
AllMusic	4.5/5 stars
MusicHound	2.5/5 stars
The Rolling Stone Album Guide	4/5 stars

The Best of the Band is the first greatest hits package by Canadian-American rock group the Band. Featuring ten tracks taken from six of their first seven albums (not counting 1974's Before the Flood or 1975's The Basement Tapes, both with Bob Dylan), it featured two tracks from the first, second, third and seventh albums, one each from the fourth and fifth, rounded out by the 1976 single "Twilight".

Record World said that "Twilight" "evokes the spirit of some of the group's finer moments."

== Track listing ==
All tracks are written by Robbie Robertson, except where stated.

Side one
No.	Title	Writer(s)	Lead vocals	Length
1.	"Up on Cripple Creek" (from The Band, 1969)		Levon Helm	4:29
2.	"The Shape I'm In" (from Stage Fright, 1970)		Richard Manuel	3:58
3.	"The Weight" (from Music from Big Pink, 1968)		Helm; Rick Danko	4:40
4.	"It Makes No Difference" (from Northern Lights – Southern Cross, 1975)		Danko	6:30
5.	"Life Is a Carnival" (from Cahoots, 1971)	Danko; Helm; Robertson	Danko; Helm	3:55

Side two
No.	Title	Writer(s)	Lead vocals	Length
1.	"Twilight" (single, 1976)		Danko	3:17
2.	"Don't Do It" (from Rock of Ages, 1972)	Holland–Dozier–Holland	Helm	5:00
3.	"Tears of Rage" (from Music from Big Pink)	Bob Dylan; Manuel	Manuel	5:23
4.	"Stage Fright" (from Stage Fright)		Danko	3:43
5.	"Ophelia" (from Northern Lights – Southern Cross)		Helm	3:32
6.	"The Night They Drove Old Dixie Down" (from The Band)		Helm	3:33

== Album origin ==
Title	Album
"Up on Cripple Creek"	The Band (1969)
"The Shape I'm In"	Stage Fright (1970)
"The Weight"	Music from Big Pink (1968)
"It Makes No Difference"	Northern Lights – Southern Cross (1975)
"Life Is a Carnival"	Cahoots (1971)
"Twilight"	1975 single
"Don't Do It"	Rock of Ages (1972)
"Tears of Rage"	Music from Big Pink
"Stage Fright"	Stage Fright
"Ophelia"	Northern Lights – Southern Cross
"The Night They Drove Old Dixie Down"	The Band

An album of the same title was released in UK on the Fame label with different cover and some different tracks.

=== Notes ===
The Band's version of the song "The Night They Drove Old Dixie Down" was also featured as part of a promotional-only compilation album released by Capitol Records entitled The Greatest Music Ever Sold (Capitol SPRO-8511/8512), which was distributed to record stores during the 1976 Holiday season as part of Capitol's "Greatest Music Ever Sold" campaign which promoted 15 greatest hits albums issued by the record label.
