= Time to Kill (song) =

- German single cover

Single by The Band

from the album Stage Fright
- B-side: "The Shape I'm In"
- Released: October 1970
- Recorded: May to June 1970; Bearsville Studios; Woodstock, New York
- Genre: Roots rock
- Label: Capitol
- Songwriter(s): Robbie Robertson
- Producer(s): The Band

"Time to Kill" is a song written by Robbie Robertson that was first released by the Band on their 1970 album Stage Fright. It was also released as a single off the album, backed with the more famous "The Shape I'm In" and, although it failed to reach the Top 40 in the United States, it peaked at #13 in the Netherlands. It has also been featured on several Band compilation and live albums.

== Lyrics and music ==
On the surface, the lyrics of "Time to Kill" extoll the joy of country life, which the Band members had enjoyed prior to becoming famous. Music critic Barney Hoskyns states that the song sounds like a "celebration of the 'mountain hideaway' to which they'd at last returned," and the lyrics explicitly reference the town Catskill in the Catskill Mountains, near Woodstock where the Band recorded The Basement Tapes with Bob Dylan. The music is also happy and upbeat. Steve Millward described the song as "a catchy medium-pacer." Rolling Stone critic John Burks describes the music as having an old fashioned sound that a Kentucky moonshiner may have hummed to himself in the 1890s. Burks also describes Robertson's guitar intro to the song as sounding like 1956 rock 'n' roll and also sounding like "like tier of sound in motion." The Band FAQ author Peter Asron notes that the song has an unusual rhyming structure, in which rhymes do not occur at regular intervals and sometimes appear to be out of sync with the song's meter.

The happy lyrics and music belie the song's irony. Hoskyns notes that the song may just as easily be expressing the group's fear about how the world has encroached on their bucolic lifestyle since their first two albums made them famous. Aaron states that the music and title are misleading and that the real theme of the song is the danger of having too much idle time on one's hands. Allmusic critic William Ruhlmann similarly states that the song's theme is the "pitfalls of fortune and fame." Something Else critic Nick DeRiso points out that around the time of the song's release the group in real life acted in accordance with the sentiments of the song, flying back to Woodstock by private plane when the opportunities arose during their concert tour. Burks notes that even the reference to Catskill may be a pun on a darker phrase "cats kill."

Rick Danko and Richard Manuel sing the lead vocal. Garth Hudson plays electric piano, in a style that DeRiso describes as sounding like coming from a "red light-district" and Hoskyns describes as "tinking." Usual Band drummer, Levon Helm plays rhythm guitar on the song while Manuel takes the drums. Robertson plays lead guitar and Danko plays bass.

== Reception ==
Hoskyns feels that this song plays it safe, describing it as "the most harmless piece of music the group had yet recorded as the Band." Hoskyns does praise Hudson's piano, and the combination of Helms' "funky" rhythm guitar with Robertson's "piercing" guitar solo. DeRiso states that "Robertson’s guitar weaves in with a serrated economy, working in counterpoint to Levon Helm’s tough rhythm riffs." Rolling Stone critic Dave Marsh described "Time to Kill" as one of the most notable "fine moments" from the Stage Fright album, along with "Stage Fright" and "The Shape I'm In." Burks praised Robertson's guitar opening and described the song as "a controlled performance, if, paradoxically, a bashing one," with "a complacent lyric" that he compared to Dylan's work at the time. Cash Box reviewed the song, stating that "cleaning up their grit a touch, the Band puts together a twinkling country - rock track that could become one of the group's most commercial singles yet" and also commented on the "stellar material and instrumental work." Record World said that "the Band seems to have 'Time to Kill'...and money to make with their latest hit."

"Time to Kill" peaked at #77 in the US on the Billboard Hot 100. It peaked higher in Canada at #45. But it did much better in the Netherlands, reaching #13.

== Other appearances ==
"Time to Kill" has been released on several of the Band's compilation albums, including the UK and Australian versions of The Best of the Band, Greatest Hits and A Musical History. The Band also played the song live in concert on several tours, including in 1970 and 1974. A live recording from 1971 was included on the 2001 CD release of Rock of Ages. That same recording was included on Live at Watkins Glen.
