= Islands (The Band album) =

Studio album by the Band
- Released: March 1977
- Studios: Shangri-La (Malibu); Village (Los Angeles)
- Length: 34:38
- Label: Capitol
- Producer: The Band

The Band chronology
The Best of the Band (1976)	Islands (1977)	Anthology (1978)

Islands is the seventh studio album by Canadian-American rock group the Band. It was released in March 1977 through Capitol Records, and was self-produced. The album, which was compiled primarily of previously unreleased outtakes, was released to fulfill the band's contract with Capitol so that the live concert album The Last Waltz (1978) could be released through Warner Bros. Records. As the band would soon break up later in 1977, Islands was the last album to feature the group's original lineup. (Note: Robbie Robertson would not rejoin the band for their 1983 reunion, and Richard Manuel would die in 1986, seven years before the release of their next studio album Jericho (1993).)

Upon release, Islands received mixed reviews and was a commercial slump for the band. While the band's cover of "Georgia on My Mind" was released the previous year in tandem with the presidential campaign of Jimmy Carter, no singles were released to promote the album. The record itself stalled at number 64 on the Billboard 200, becoming the lowest-charting of all the band's albums for Capitol. Both contemporary and retrospective reviews consider the album to be inferior to the band's previous work, though certain tracks have been singled out for praise. The album has been reissued multiple times, including with bonus material in 2001.

== Background and recording ==
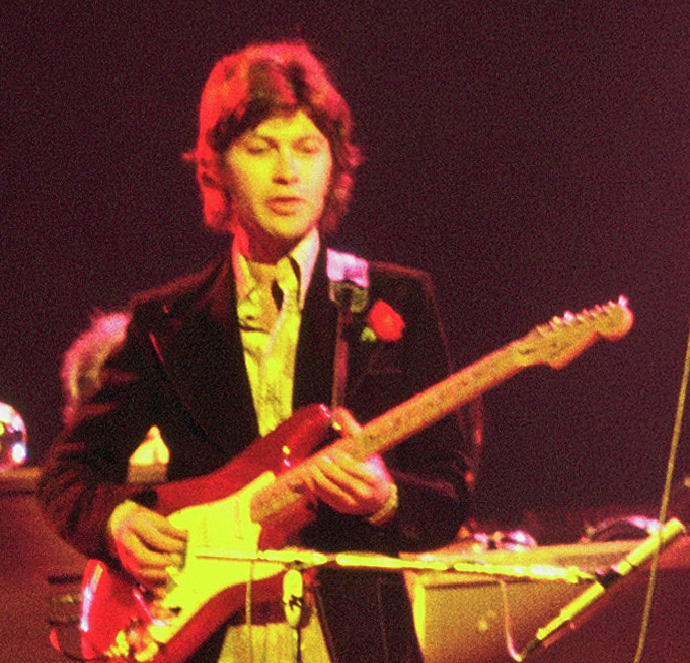
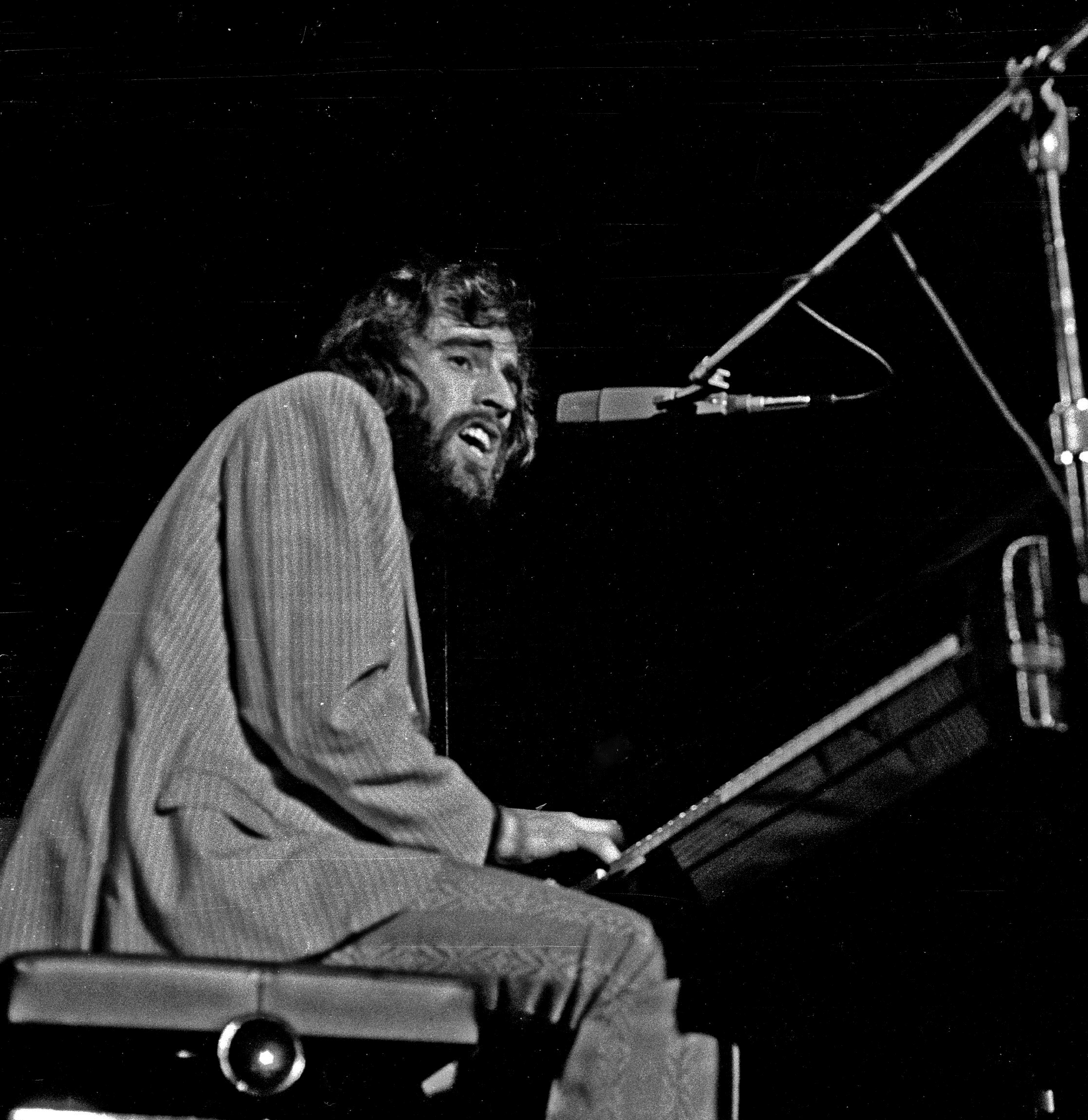
Islands was the Band's last album to feature guitarist and primary songwriter Robbie Robertson (left, pictured in 1974) and pianist and vocalist Richard Manuel (Note: Aside from posthumous appearances on Jericho (1993) and High on the Hog (1996)) (right, pictured in 1971).

The Band released their sixth studio album, Northern Lights – Southern Cross, in 1975. The album received positive reviews from critics, with some declaring it among the group's best work, but was a commercial disappointment, falling outside the top 20 in the US. Troubles arose while touring behind the album, including a major powerboat accident suffered by pianist and vocalist Richard Manuel, as well as a general loss of enthusiasm for touring. Additionally, Manuel's failing health and drug addictions caused his vocal abilities to suffer, while Robertson adopted an increasingly cynical and hesitant attitude towards the business end of the band. These issues culminated in Robbie Robertson's decision to cease the band's touring schedule, culminating in a finale concert entitled The Last Waltz, which would take place on November 25, 1976. Mo Ostin, president of Warner Bros. Records and a friend of Robertson's, helped to finance the concert film in exchange for the rights to release the corresponding live album on his label. Because of this, the group needed to compile one more album's worth of new material to complete their current contract with Capitol before The Last Waltz could be released.

With the exception of the album's title track, which dated back to earlier sessions at Bearsville Studios in New York, all of the material on Islands originated from various recording sessions at the band's own Shangri-La studio in Malibu, California, in the year and a half period following the release of Northern Lights – Southern Cross. The band did not undertake these sessions with the intention of completing an album; rather, the group entered Shangri-La simply out of a desire to record with no larger plans. After realizing their need to submit one last album to Capitol, the group began work on completing the older material; the band alternated between this project and rehearsals for The Last Waltz at Shangri-La. Recordings continued up to just days before The Last Waltz, with bassist Rick Danko finishing his harmony vocals on "Livin' in a Dream" in the early hours of November 22 after having spent the entire previous day rehearsing for the upcoming performance.

The title track, the oldest on the album, began as a guitar riff composed by Danko years earlier, which caught the attention of Robertson. Originally titled "Dr. Medicine Song", the piece would continue to be developed through Danko and Robertson working with a drum machine, while keyboardist Garth Hudson would also make contributions to the track. By late 1976, Robertson had planned to write lyrics for the track, but these plans were later abandoned and it remained an instrumental.

== Composition ==
Due to the circumstances under which it was created, Robert Palmer (writing for the New York Times) describes Islands as the Band's "least pretentious, most off-the-cuff studio album", whose "roughness" makes the album "all the more charming." Palmer also notes the increased presence of Hudson, calling him the group's "dominant player" who "add[s] layers of synthesizers and organ and contribut[es] gritty saxophone solos at every turn." Robertson said there was a sense of "sophistication" in "Right as Rain" due to the use of major seventh chords and a "light" and "sweet" tone; he also compared the track to the work of Stevie Wonder. Peter Aaron, author of The Band FAQ: All That's Left to Know About the Fathers of Americana, likens the track to soft rock bands such as Exile and Ambrosia. The song also includes Hudson's keyboard work as well as a soprano saxophone solo. The following track, "Street Walker", was described by Aaron as a "prostitute's lament". Palmer describes Robertson's solo as "stinging", while Aaron notes the prominent use of pinch harmonics. Palmer also highlights the track's "aggressive" saxophone, while suggesting that its lyrics may have been inspired by the sex workers' rights organization COYOTE. Aaron considers "Let the Night Fall" to be a yacht rock track whose lyrics are a "metaphorical commentary on the group's nocturnal lifestyle". Helm takes the lead vocal for a cover of Homer Banks' "Ain't That a Lot of Love", originally released in 1966. Robertson felt the song's style was natural for the band, stating: "it was like here's a song that's got our name written all over it… we just had to do it." In the liner notes for the album's 2001 reissue, Rob Bowman compares the song to the group's earlier covers album Moondog Matinee (1973). "Christmas Must Be Tonight" was inspired by the birth of Robertson's son and contains "crystalline" synthesizer and organ playing from Hudson, which Aaron credits with creating an "appropriately peaceful, reverent air."

Robertson likened the album's instrumental title track to movie background music, citing its "cinematic" flavor. Instrumentation on the song includes "elegant" soprano saxophone as well as synthesized flute and strings, with the latter giving the song a "vaguely Celtic" sound according to Bowman. Aaron describes "The Saga of Pepote Rouge" as a "Danko vehicle" possessing a "descending gospel melody" with "full-bodied" backup vocals by Helm and Manuel. Aaron described its lyrics as "Buñuel-esque", while Robertson himself characterized his writing as "fairy tale-ish" and "mythological", likening it to Carlos Castaneda's The Teachings of Don Juan (1968). Bowman refers to the track as "one of Robbie's trademark stream-of-consciousness stories." "Georgia on My Mind" contains a vocal performance from Manuel which Aaron considers to be "heart-melting", while, like "Ain't That a Lot of Love", Bowman compares it to the band's work on Moondog Matinee. Palmer comments on Manuel's "anguished" vocal and Danko's "loping, idiosyncratic bass patterns" as the song's defining features. "Knockin' Lost John" contains Robertson's first lead vocal on a Band album since "To Kingdom Come" (1968); Aaron lists Hudson's accordion work and Robertson's "detuned" guitar solos as the song's highlights. The lyrics, which are set during the Great Depression, have been described as an "off beat tale", while Bowman states the music "evokes a feeling of looseness and spontaneity". The album concludes with "Livin' in a Dream", which has been described as "ironic", given the contrast between the song's hopeful and optimistic nature and the frayed state of the band at the time. Aaron describes the track as "deceptively cheery", highlighting Helm's whistling at the song's conclusion as an example of this emotional juxtaposition.

== Release ==
The album art of Islands was designed by Bob Cato and depicts the five band members' profiles set against a coastal sunset. Some have described a correlation between the album's title of Islands and the state of the Band at the time of its release, with Aaron stating: "…the group had drifted apart, each member isolated on his own emotional island. Or, perhaps more accurately, Robertson, who wanted the group to stop performing, was on one island and the others were on another." In his review of the album for Rolling Stone, Greil Marcus also suggested a correlation between the album's title and their then-recent farewell concert as well as the growing number of side projects being held by members of the group at the time, stating these facets all added up to the implication that Islands would be the Band's "last word".

Upon release, Islands was a commercial failure, stalling at number 64 in the US, the lowest placement of any of the band's Capitol albums. While "Georgia on My Mind" was released as a single in tandem with the 1976 presidential campaign of Jimmy Carter (and months before the release of Islands), no singles were released in promotion of the album itself.

In later years, Robertson lamented Capitol's decision to market the record as the band's next studio album, instead of a "record of B-sides and outtakes". In the liner notes of the Islands CD reissue, Robertson went as far as to state that Islands "wasn't an album" and instead was a release simply meant to fulfill the band's contract. Bowman himself compares the album to outtakes compilations such as the Who's Odds and Sods and Jefferson Airplane's Early Flight (both 1974).

== Critical reception ==
Professional ratings
Review scores
Source	Rating
AllMusic	2/5 stars
Christgau's Record Guide	C+
MusicHound Rock	woof!
Q	2/5 stars
Record Mirror	5/5 stars
The Rolling Stone Album Guide	2.5/5 stars

Upon its release, reviews for Islands were mixed. In his review for Rolling Stone, Greil Marcus praised much of the album's second side, calling the title track "slight and pretty" and highlighting Manuel's vocals on "Georgia on My Mind"; Marcus named "Livin' in a Dream" as the album's best track. He disparaged the band's version of "Ain't That a Lot of Love" as "the stiffest excuse for R&B [he] ever want[s] to hear" despite what he felt were strong past live performances of the song by the group, while also stating that "too many of Robbie Robertson's tunes offer cracker-barrel banalities without the music that could redeem them — or disguise them." The Rolling Stone Album Guide referred to the album as a "barely listenable collection of outtakes". Robert Christgau reviewed the album negatively, giving it a grade of C+ and calling it a "listless farewell to old habits".

Conversely, Rosalind Russell of Record Mirror awarded the album five stars out of five, praising Robertson's "haunting" songwriting and vocals and stating the record was one in a "long line of perfect albums". Record World also gave the album a positive review, highlighting the title track, "Right as Rain", "Let the Night Fall", and "Georgia on My Mind" as "glistening performances", and declaring the album to be "as timeless as ever." Cashbox praised the album, stating the Band "manage[d] to sound fresh without losing their particular sound identity." The review highlighted the covers of "Ain't That a Lot of Love" and "Georgia on My Mind", and called the album as a whole "distinctive" and properly representative of the group. Palmer criticized the lyrics of "Street Walker" and "Let the Night Fall", declaring them to be "among [Robertson's] baldest efforts", but praised "Right as Rain" and "Knockin' Lost John", calling them "as touching and memorable as any [song] Robertson has written." He concluded that Islands is "not the Band's best album, but it is the real thing."

Retrospective comments on the album have been mixed to negative. Reviewing the 1991 reissue, John Bauldie in Q called the album "a ragbag of old outtakes and otherwise unplaceable new numbers." In a retrospective review for AllMusic, William Ruhlmann praised the band's playing, as well as Manuel's vocals on "Georgia in My Mind", but felt the album ultimately fell short of the standards set by the band's earlier work. Aaron describes Islands as a "half-baked, phoned-in effort" which results in an "underwhelming swan song" for the group's original lineup. Some songs on Islands have been retrospectively singled out for praise. In a retrospective of the band's catalog, Rolling Stone described "Christmas Must Be Tonight", "The Saga of Pepote Rouge", and "Georgia on My Mind" as highlights. American Songwriter also praised "Christmas Must Be Tonight", stating the song "rises way above your typical rock holiday fare", as well as highlighting Danko's vocals and describing the song as "one of the last examples of the special chemistry that epitomized [the Band's] original lineup."

== Track listing ==
Side one
No.	Title	Writer(s)	Lead vocals	Length
1.	"Right as Rain"	Robbie Robertson	Richard Manuel	3:50
2.	"Street Walker"	Robertson; Rick Danko	Danko	3:14
3.	"Let the Night Fall"	Robertson	Manuel	3:08
4.	"Ain't That a Lot of Love"	Homer Banks; Willia Dean Parker	Levon Helm	3:06
5.	"Christmas Must Be Tonight"	Robertson	Danko	3:35
Total length:				16:53

Side two
No.	Title	Writer(s)	Lead vocals	Length
1.	"Islands"	Robertson; Garth Hudson; Danko	instrumental	3:51
2.	"The Saga of Pepote Rouge"	Robertson	Danko	4:12
3.	"Georgia on My Mind"	Hoagy Carmichael; Stuart Gorrell	Manuel	3:05
4.	"Knockin' Lost John"	Robertson	Robertson	3:48
5.	"Livin' in a Dream"	Robertson	Helm	2:49
Total length:				17:45 34:38

Bonus tracks (2001 CD reissue)
No.	Title	Writer(s)	Lead vocals	Length
11.	"Twilight" (single version)	Robertson	Danko	3:17
12.	"Georgia on My Mind" (alternate take)	Carmichael; Gorrell	Manuel	3:51
Total length:				41:46

== Personnel ==
The Band

- Rick Danko – bass guitar, vocals
- Levon Helm – drums, vocals
- Garth Hudson – organ, synthesizers, saxophones, accordion, piccolo on "Islands"
- Richard Manuel – piano, electric piano, vocals
- Robbie Robertson – guitars, lead vocal on "Knockin' Lost John"

Additional musicians

- Jim Gordon – flute on "Islands"
- Tom Malone – trombone on "Islands"
- John Simon – alto saxophone on "Islands"
- Larry Packer – violin on "Islands"

Production

- Ed Anderson – engineering
- Neil Brody – engineering
- Rob Fraboni – engineering
- Nat Jeffrey – engineering
