= Most Likely You Go Your Way and I'll Go Mine =

1966 song by Bob Dylan

- Cover of the 1967 German single with "Most Likely You Go Your Way and I'll Go Mine" as the B-side

Single by Bob Dylan

from the album Blonde on Blonde
- A-side: "Leopard-Skin Pill-Box Hat" (1967)
- B-side: "Stage Fright" (Live, 1974)
- Released: April 24, 1967
- Recorded: March 9, 1966
- Studio: Columbia Studio B, Nashville
- Length: 3:30
- Label: Columbia
- Songwriter: Bob Dylan
- Producer: Bob Johnston

Bob Dylan singles chronology
| "Something There Is About You" (1974) | "Most Likely You Go Your Way and I'll Go Mine" (1974) | "It Ain't Me Babe (Live)" (1974) |

Official audio/video
- "Most Likely You Go Your Way (And I'll Go Mine)" (album version, audio) on YouTube

"Most Likely You Go Your Way and I'll Go Mine", or "Most Likely You Go Your Way (and I'll Go Mine)", (Note: The original album release showed the title without parentheses. The version with parentheses appears on Bob Dylan's official website and in his book of collected lyrics.) is a song by the American singer-songwriter Bob Dylan. It was released as the first track on side three of his seventh studio album Blonde on Blonde (1966). The song was written by Dylan and produced by Bob Johnston. Dylan recounted that he had probably written the song after the end of a relationship. The song's narrator criticizes the lies and weakness of a woman, and says that he finds it hard to care. The final verse establishes that the woman has been unfaithful to the narrator by having a relationship with another man, as he suspected all along.

Six takes, two of them complete, were recorded at Columbia Studio B in Nashville, on March 9, 1966, with Dylan accompanied by members of The Nashville A-Team of studio musicians that had been engaged for the album sessions, alongside organist Al Kooper and guitarist Robbie Robertson. The album version received a positive critical reception, with several reviewers praising the lyrics and music. The song was also released as the B-side of "Leopard-Skin Pill-Box Hat" in 1967.

Dylan has performed the song in concert over 500 times, from January 1974 to April 2024. It was prominently featured during the Bob Dylan and The Band 1974 Tour and a live version from the subsequent album Before the Flood was issued as a single on August 31, 1974 and reached number 66 on the US chart. Critics noted that this live version was more intense and aggressive than the original cut. "Most Likely You Go Your Way and I'll Go Mine" was the first of Dylan's songs to be remixed; that 2007 remix by Mark Ronson reached number 51 on the UK chart, and confounded the expectations of several critics who found that the track was unexpectedly enjoyable. The song has been covered by Hard Meat (1970), by Todd Rundgren (1976), and by Patti LaBelle on her solo debut album (1977).

== Background and recording ==
The album Another Side of Bob Dylan (1964) saw Bob Dylan start to move away from the contemporary folk music sound that had characterized his early albums. Bringing It All Back Home (1965) featured both electric and acoustic tracks, and Highway 61 Revisited later that year was purely electric. In 1965, he hired the Hawks as his backing group, but recording sessions in New York for a new album were not productive with them, and he accepted a suggestion from his producer Bob Johnston that the recording sessions should transfer to Nashville, Tennessee. Dylan went to Nashville in February 1966, with Al Kooper and Robbie Robertson from the New York sessions also making the trip.

"Most Likely You Go Your Way and I'll Go Mine" was recorded at Columbia Studio B in Nashville, on March 9, 1966, at the fifth of the sessions there. The track features Dylan singing and playing harmonica, with members of the A-Team of studio musicians that had been engaged for the album sessions, including Charlie McCoy on trumpet, Hargus "Pig" Robbins on piano, Kenny Buttrey on drums, and guitarists Joe South, and Wayne Moss, alongside Kooper on organ and Robertson on guitar. Dylan had earlier worked with McCoy, who had played guitar on "Desolation Row". The group worked on the track between six and nine p.m., recording six takes, two of which were complete. The sixth take was the master. As he did with other songs at the Nashville sessions, Dylan revised the lyrics during the recording sessions.

In the liner notes to Biograph (1985), Dylan explained that it was "probably written after some disappointing relationship where, you know, I was lucky to have escaped without a broken nose". The song is in AABA form. In the first verse, the narrator criticizes the lies and weakness of a woman, and during the second verse expresses that "sometimes it gets so hard to care". Following what the critic Andy Gill summarises as a "quirky, nonsensical middle-eight concerning a badly-built, stilt-walking judge", the final verse establishes that the woman has been unfaithful to the narrator, as he suspected.

The song, lasting three minutes and 30 seconds, was released as the first track on side three of Dylan's seventh studio album Blonde on Blonde, on June 20, 1966. The following March, it appeared as the B-side of the "Leopard-Skin Pill-Box Hat" single, which reached number 81 in the American Billboard charts.

== Critical comments ==
Ben Beaumont-Thomas of The Guardian described "Most Likely You Go Your Way and I'll Go Mine" as "a breakup song whose narrator can't deal with the unpredictability and lack of commitment from their partner". Dylan's biographer Robert Shelton felt that the lyrics "for all their mundaneness, build with economy a dialogue of lovers parting". Gill also commented on the plainness of the lyrics, and thought that apart from the middle-eight, they were the most "straightforward" from Dylan's output from 1965 and 1966. Despite this, commentators have been divided on the effect of the song. Mike Marqusee considered that the song was "remarkable for the sustained petty rage" contained in it, and presented "a heady and affecting mix of desire, regret, jealousy, and disgust"; David Yaffe felt the song was "venomous". In contrast, Daryl Sanders, author of a book about the recording of Blonde on Blonde, wrote that the song was relatively tame for one tackling a breakup.

The musicianship was praised by the San Francisco Examiner critic Ralph Gleason, who called it a "wildly swinging track", and by Oliver Trager, who regarded it as "one of Dylan's most infectious stompers".

Neil Spencer, who noted that a version of the title appears in the lyrics of Buddy Holly's recording of "It Doesn't Matter Anymore" (1958), gave the song a rating of 5/5 stars in an Uncut magazine Dylan supplement in 2015. Author John Nogowski rated the song as "B+", and described it as "Dylan's personal Declaration of Independence, set to a martial beat".

== Live performances ==
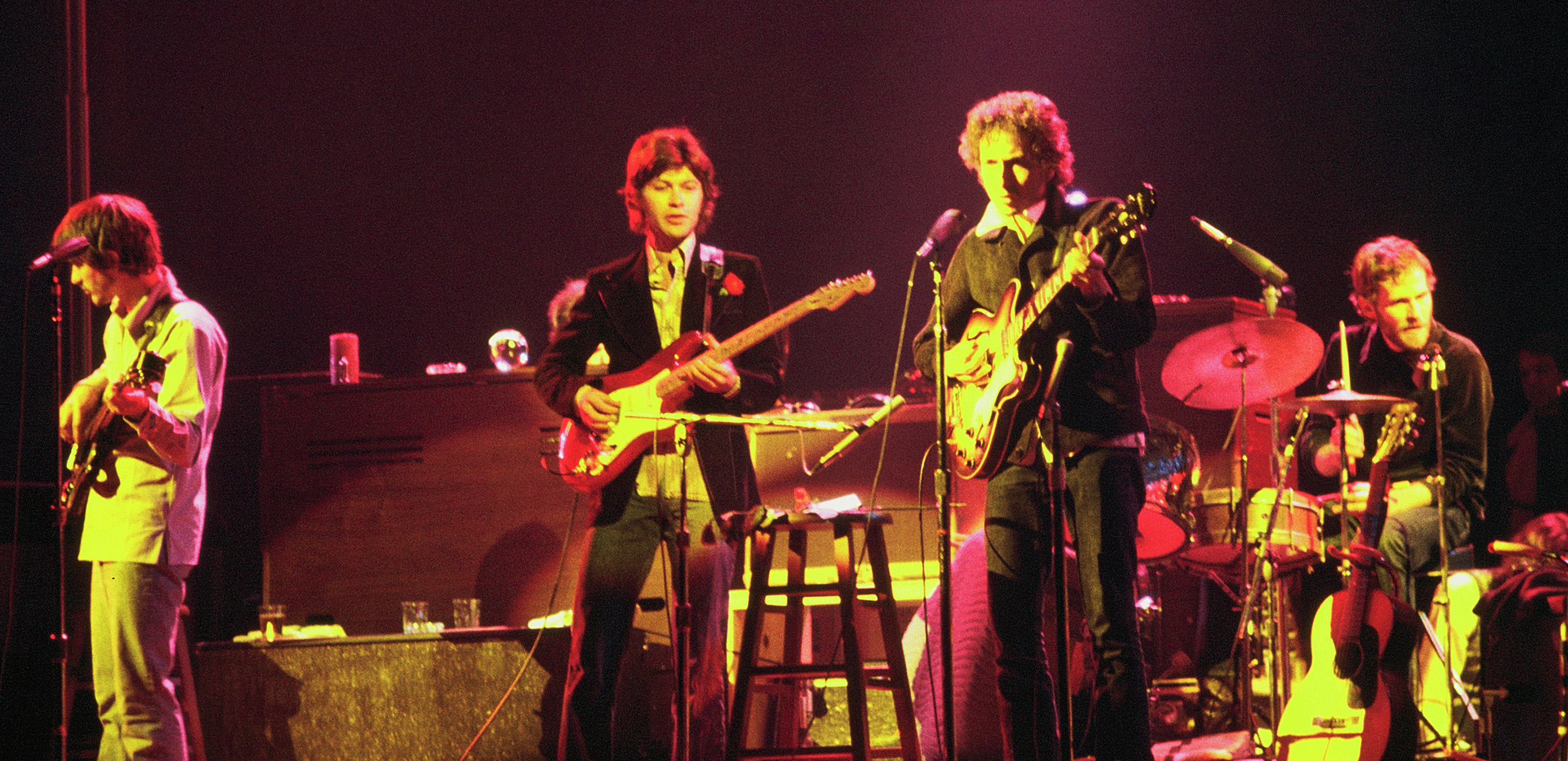
Bob Dylan and the Band in 1974. From left to right: Rick Danko (bass), Robbie Robertson (guitar), Bob Dylan (guitar), Levon Helm (drums). Robertson wrote in 2016 that "We started kicking off the show with a ripping version of 'Most Likely You Go Your Way (and I'll Go Mine)'. Then Bob suggested we end the show with it as well, like bookends. I'd never heard of that before, so we gave it a shot."

"Most Likely You Go Your Way and I'll Go Mine" was frequently the concert opening and encore song on the Bob Dylan and The Band 1974 Tour. One such performance was included later that year as the first track on the resulting live album, Before the Flood. Released as a single, it reached number 66 on the Billboard Hot 100, and number 47 on the Cash Box Top 100 Pop Singles. The reviewer for Cash Box wrote that it was a "natural rocker done up in heavier, contemporary style" and that the musicians provided excellent backing for Dylan's powerful singing. According to Paul Williams, the performances of the song represented a statement by Dylan that there was no real relationship and the audience, although it was still as if he was saying to the audience that "as long as we remember this we can have a good time here tonight". Tim Riley called the song as performed on the tour Dylan's "most dramatic antilove letter to his audience, the number that flaunts his self-assurance even as it vents injury". Riley wrote that while the 1966 version proceeded with "deadpan irony", the 1974 live version "fairly seethes ... a song less about the comedy of a fallout than the ravages". Jim Beviglia felt that the 1974 "in-your-face wail of exasperation" was a mutation from the more distant sense from the 1966 recording. Similarly, John Nogowski commented that the live performance was harder and more uptempo than the album track, with Dylan's voice "aggressive, filled with exclamation points".

According to his official website, Dylan has performed the song in concert over 400 times since debuting the song live at Chicago Stadium on January 3, 1974, with the most recent performances occurring on the European leg of his Rough and Rowdy Ways World Wide Tour, in November 2022. In a review of the performance at the New Theatre Oxford on November 4, Nick Hasted of Uncut commented that Dylan's delivery left a "comically canyon-wide" pause between the two phrases in the song's title.

== Cover versions and 2007 remix ==
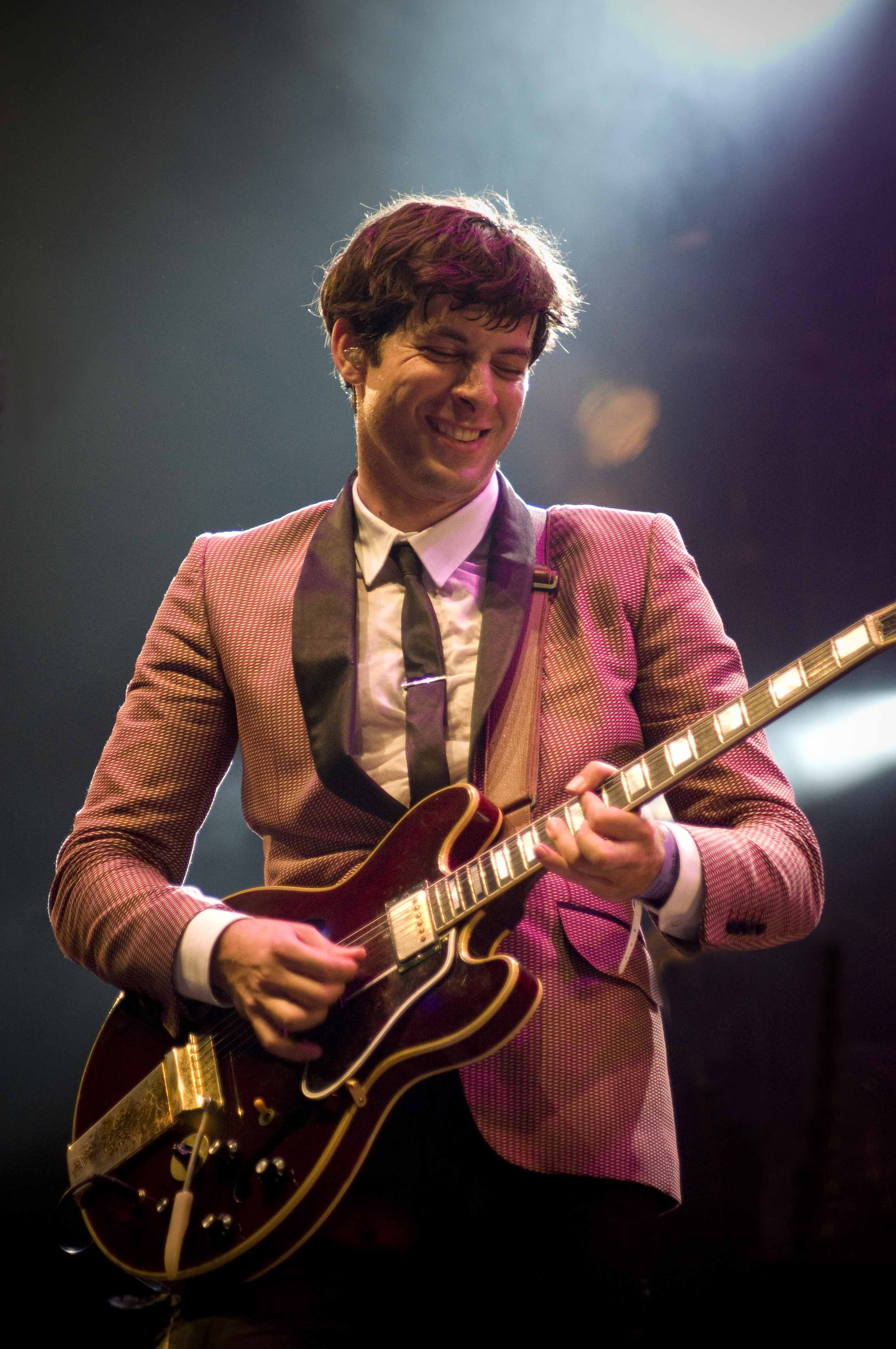
Mark Ronson (pictured in 2008) told Gus Wenner of Rolling Stone that he did not want to remix one of Dylan's best-known songs, and preferred "Most Likely You Go Your Way and I'll Go Mine" as it "already has an amazing groove to it, like the drums and all that stuff thats going on. It's almost like this New Orleans Second Line-type drumming."

British progressive rock group Hard Meat included a cover of "Most Likely You Go Your Way and I'll Go Mine" on their debut album in 1970. The staff writer for Cash Box felt that it was the highlight of an album that could sell well, but The Sentinel's reviewer thought it was one of the album tracks "tending toward the loud and low in quality".

A version by Todd Rundgren on Faithful (1976) was criticized as "a foolish parody of Dylan" by John Bialas in the Sun Herald, and described as "notable only as a passable Dylan imitation" by Rick Atkinson in The Record. Patti LaBelle covered the song on her eponymous solo debut album (1977). Dave Marsh felt that her version was "at best competent", and might have been improved but for her producer David Rubinson whose "notion of funk remains as stiff and fey as ever". In the Los Angeles Times, Don Snowden also criticized the album's production, and that the track, "given the formula funk treatment", suffered from a "highly cliched musical approach".

=== 2007 remix ===
Mark Ronson reworked and remixed "Most Likely You Go Your Way and I'll Go Mine" in 2007, the first time that one of Dylan's songs had been remixed. It was available on the digital edition of Dylan (2007), and as a 7-inch and CD single. Ronson and Columbia Records executive Mike Smith were invited to choose a track from Dylan's back catalog to remix. Smith felt that the original had "a great rhythmic backbeat ... [and] a timeless, universal lyric", and predicted that the remix would "confound people's expectations of Bob, which he has done throughout his career". An accompanying video showed an actor, seen from behind, portraying Dylan at several stages of his career. This version charted at number 51 in the UK.

Paul Morley wrote in The Sunday Telegraph that Ronson "takes a classic hand-made Dylan landmark and turns it into a cheap mass-produced plastic model", and contrasted "Ronson's bloodless flashiness" with "the tangled flash of Dylan [which] is fantastically alienated and perversely meditative." Jeremiah Tucker of The Joplin Globe regarded the track as one of Dylan's best releases of recent years, and "Proof that Dylan's songs are sturdy enough to be kicked around a bit."

Several reviewers, including Joe Levy for Rolling Stone, John Mulvey of Uncut, and David Williamson of the Western Daily Mail were pleasantly surprised by how much they enjoyed the remixed track. Levy thought that the track had "los[t] some of the spite in the process", but felt that listeners should be grateful for how true to the original the track was. For Mulvey, the remix was not "quite the disaster it could have been", although "Dylan's rancorous vocal sounds a little small and overwhelmed". Williamson found the version an example of "genuine innovation" that "preserves the core lyric and the rhythmic spine yet somehow instils the urge to leap up and down".

== Personnel ==
The personnel for the original album session were as follows. According to studio records, McCoy played both bass and trumpet on the track. Kooper recalled McCoy on bass and picking up the trumpet to play it one handed whilst continuing to play bass with the other; however, although McCoy did sometimes play both instruments at the same time with his band the Escorts, he has stated that he only played trumpet on "Most Likely You Go Your Way and I'll Go Mine".

Musicians

- Bob Dylan – vocals, harmonica
- Robbie Robertson – electric guitar
- Wayne Moss – electric guitar
- Al Kooper – organ
- Hargus Robbins – piano
- Charlie McCoy – trumpet
- Joe South – bass
- Kenneth Buttrey – drums

Technical

- Bob Johnston – production

== Charts ==
Bob Dylan version (as the B-side of "Leopard-Skin Pill-Box Hat")
| Chart (1967) | Peak position |
|---|---|
| US Billboard Hot 100 | 81 |
| US Top 100 (Cashbox) | 97 |

Bob Dylan and the Band live version
| Chart (1974) | Peak position |
|---|---|
| US Billboard Hot 100 | 66 |
| US Top 100 (Cashbox) | 47 |

Mark Ronson remix
| Chart (2007) | Peak position |
|---|---|
| Germany (Official German Charts) | 99 |
| UK (Official Charts Company) | 51 |
