= The Last Waltz =

1978 concert film directed by Martin Scorsese

- Original theatrical release poster
- Directed by: Martin Scorsese
- Produced by: Robbie Robertson; Jonathan Taplin; Bill Graham
- Starring: Rick Danko; Levon Helm; Garth Hudson; Richard Manuel; Robbie Robertson; Eric Clapton; Neil Diamond; Bob Dylan; Emmylou Harris; Joni Mitchell; Van Morrison; The Staples; Dr. John; Muddy Waters; Paul Butterfield; Ronnie Hawkins; Ringo Starr; Ron Wood; Neil Young
- Cinematography: Michael Chapman
- Edited by: Jan Roblee; Yeu-Bun Yee
- Music by: The Band (with special guests)
- Distributed by: United Artists
- Release date: April 26, 1978
- Running time: 116 minutes
- Country: United States
- Language: English
- Box office: $340,687 (original release)

The Last Waltz was a concert by the Canadian-American rock group the Band, held on American Thanksgiving Day, November 25, 1976, at Winterland Ballroom in San Francisco. The Last Waltz was advertised as the Band's "farewell concert appearance", and the concert had the Band joined by more than a dozen special guests, including their previous employers Ronnie Hawkins and Bob Dylan, as well as Paul Butterfield, Bobby Charles, Eric Clapton, Neil Diamond, Emmylou Harris, Dr. John, Joni Mitchell, Van Morrison, the Staple Singers, Ringo Starr, Muddy Waters, Ronnie Wood, and Neil Young. The musical director for the concert was the Band's original record producer, John Simon.

The concert was produced and managed by Bill Graham and was filmed by director Martin Scorsese, who made it into a documentary of the same title, released in 1978. Jonathan Taplin, who was the Band's tour manager from 1969 to 1972 and later produced Scorsese's film Mean Streets, suggested that Scorsese would be the ideal director for the project, and Rock Brynner introduced Robbie Robertson to Scorsese. Taplin served as executive producer. The film features concert performances, intermittent song renditions shot on a studio soundstage, and interviews by Scorsese with members of the Band. The soundtrack and DVD were later released.

The Last Waltz is hailed as one of the greatest documentary concert films ever made, second only to Stop Making Sense. In 2019, the film was selected by the Library of Congress for preservation in the United States National Film Registry for being "culturally, historically, or aesthetically significant".

== Plot ==
Beginning with a title card saying, "This film should be played loud!" the concert documentary covers the Band's influences and career. The group consisted of Rick Danko on bass, violin, and vocals, Levon Helm on drums, mandolin, and vocals, Garth Hudson on keyboards, saxophone and accordion, songwriter Richard Manuel on keyboards, drums, percussion and vocals, and primary songwriter Robbie Robertson on guitar and vocals.

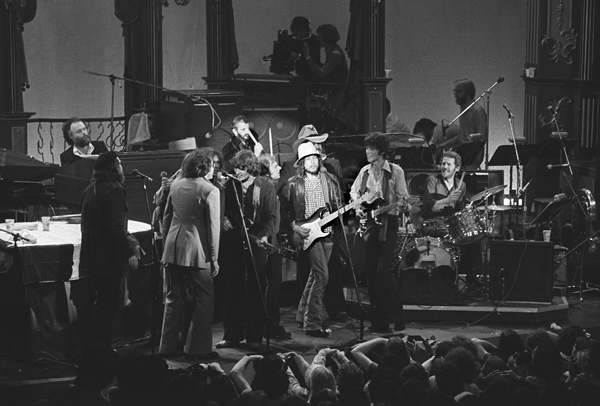
The Band, with Bob Dylan and guests, during "I Shall Be Released"

Various other artists perform with the Band: Muddy Waters, Paul Butterfield, Neil Young, Joni Mitchell, Van Morrison, Dr. John, Neil Diamond, and Eric Clapton. Genres covered include blues, rock and roll, New Orleans R&B, Tin Pan Alley pop, folk, and rock. Further genres are explored in segments filmed later on a sound stage with Emmylou Harris (country) and the Staple Singers (soul and gospel).

The film begins with the Band performing the last song of the evening, their cover version of the Marvin Gaye hit "Don't Do It", as an encore. The film then flashes back to the beginning of the concert, and follows it more or less chronologically. The Band is backed by a large horn section and performs many of its hit songs, including "Up on Cripple Creek", "Stage Fright", and "The Night They Drove Old Dixie Down".

The live songs are interspersed with studio segments and interviews conducted by director Martin Scorsese in which the Band's members reminisce about the group's history. Robertson talks about Hudson joining the band on the condition that the other members pay him $10 a week each for music lessons. The classically trained Hudson could then tell his parents that he was a music teacher instead of merely a rock-and-roll musician. Robertson also describes the surreal experience of playing in a burnt-out nightclub owned by Jack Ruby.

Manuel recalls that some of the early names for the Band included "The Honkies", and "The Crackers". Because they were simply referred to as "the band" by Dylan and their friends and neighbors in Woodstock, New York where they were Dylan's backing band, they figured that was just what they would call themselves.

Danko is seen giving Scorsese a tour of the Band's Shangri-La studio, and he plays a recording of "Sip the Wine", a track from his then-forthcoming 1977 solo album Rick Danko.

A recurring theme brought up in the interviews with Robertson is that the concert marks an end of an era for the Band, that after 16 years on the road, the time had come for a change. "That's what The Last Waltz is - 16 years on the road. The numbers start to scare you," Robertson tells Scorsese. "I mean, I couldn't live with 20 years on the road. I don't think I could even discuss it."

== Origins ==
The idea for a farewell concert came about early in 1976 after Richard Manuel was seriously injured in a boating accident. Robbie Robertson then began giving thought to leaving the road, envisioning the Band becoming a studio-only band, similar to the Beatles' decision to stop playing live shows in 1966. He was also concerned about the negative effects of being on the road too long:

I had become suspicious of the road. Look at what happened to this guy. Look at what happened to them. These people who got crazy when they got on the road. This was not a healthy thing. I was telling the guys in the Band, "I like the music we make together. But I don't want to go out there with it anymore. . . . We're not learning from it. We're not growing from it.

Though the other band members did not agree with Robertson's decision, the concert was set at Bill Graham's Winterland Ballroom, where the Band had made its debut as a group in 1969. Originally, the Band was to perform on its own, but then the notion of inviting Ronnie Hawkins and Bob Dylan was hatched and the guest list grew to include other performers. Robertson wanted to invite people who had been a strong influence on their music, people who represented various music styles, including New Orleans rock and roll, English blues, and Chicago blues. When he called Bill Graham, he said he wanted the concert to be a kind of celebration, the end of a chapter.

With only six weeks before the planned date, Robertson called director Martin Scorsese, who he knew loved rock music and had worked at the Woodstock Festival, to see if he would direct it as a concert documentary. When he mentioned some of the performers they had lined up, Scorsese reacted quickly: "Van Morrison? Are you kidding? I have to do it. I don't have a choice." The group promoted the concert by appearing on the October 30 episode of Saturday Night Live, where host Buck Henry introduced them by saying they were about to disband on Thanksgiving. They went into a set of "Life Is a Carnival" and "The Night They Drove Old Dixie Down" (which featured a photo montage of the Band throughout their career) both sung by Helm, Danko then sang "Stage Fright" and closed out the episode with a cover of "Georgia on My Mind" with Manuel on lead vocals.

== Concert ==
Promoted and organized by Bill Graham, whose home turf was Winterland and who had a long association with the Band, the concert was an elaborate affair, with over 300 workers. Starting at 5:00 pm, the audience of 5,000 was served turkey dinners. There was ballroom dancing, with music by the Berkeley Promenade Orchestra. Poets Lawrence Ferlinghetti, Lenore Kandel, Diane di Prima, Michael McClure, Robert Duncan, and Freewheelin' Frank gave readings.

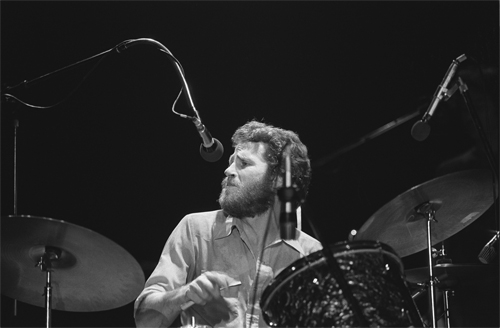
The Band's drummer and vocalist Levon Helm

The Band started its concert at around 9:00 pm, opening with "Up on Cripple Creek". This was followed by eleven more of the Band's most popular songs, including "The Shape I'm In", "This Wheel's on Fire", and "The Night They Drove Old Dixie Down". They were backed by a large horn section with charts arranged by Allen Toussaint and other musicians.

They were then joined by a succession of guest artists, starting with Ronnie Hawkins. As the Hawks, the Band served as Hawkins' backing band in the early 1960s. Dr. John took a seat at the piano for his signature song, "Such a Night". He then switched to guitar and joined Bobby Charles on "Down South in New Orleans".

A blues set was next with harmonica player Paul Butterfield, Muddy Waters, Waters touring guitar player Bob Margolin, pianist Pinetop Perkins, and Eric Clapton. As Clapton was taking his first solo on "Further on Up the Road", his guitar strap came loose and Robertson picked up the solo without missing a beat.

Neil Young followed, singing "Helpless" with backing vocals by Joni Mitchell, who remained off stage. According to Robertson's commentary on The Last Waltz DVD, this was so her later appearance in the show would have more of an impact. Mitchell came on after Young and sang three songs, two with the backing of Dr. John on congas.

Neil Diamond was next, introducing his "Dry Your Eyes" by saying, "I'm only gonna do one song, but I'm gonna do it good." Robertson had produced Diamond's album Beautiful Noise the same year and co-wrote "Dry Your Eyes", which during the concert he hailed as a "great song".

Van Morrison then performed two songs, a special arrangement of "Tura Lura Lural (That's an Irish Lullaby)" as a duet with Richard Manuel and his own show-stopper, "Caravan".

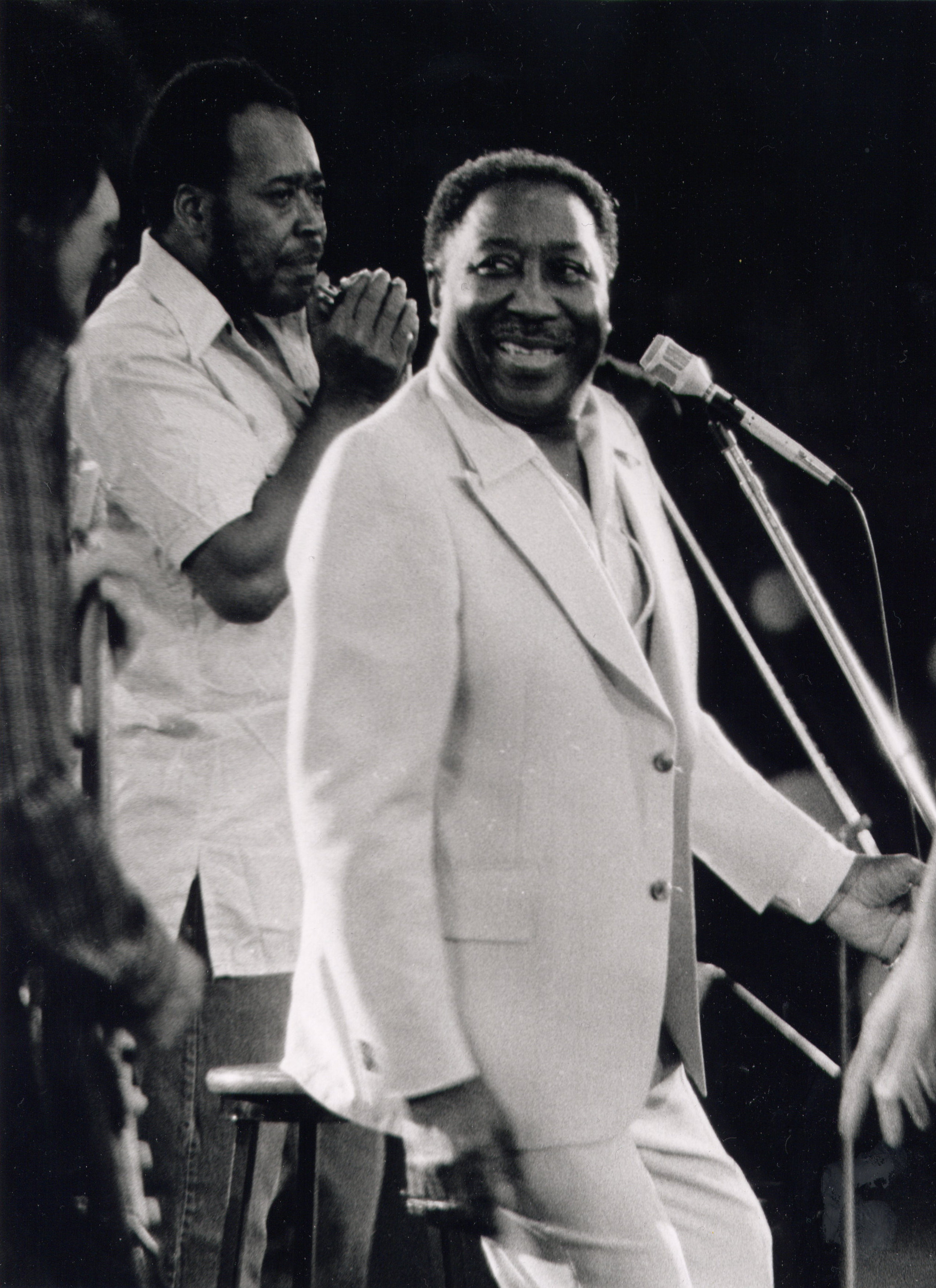
Bluesman Muddy Waters guested with the Band for the concert.

Canadians Young and Mitchell were then invited back out to help the Band perform "Acadian Driftwood", an ode to the Acadians of Canadian history. The Band then performed a short set of some more of its songs before Bob Dylan came on stage to lead his former backing band through four songs.

The Band and all its guests, with the addition of Ringo Starr on drums and Ronnie Wood on guitar, then sang "I Shall Be Released" as a closing number. Dylan, who wrote the song, and Manuel, whose falsetto rendition had made the song famous on Music from Big Pink, shared lead vocals, although Manuel cannot be clearly seen in the film and switched between his normal and falsetto voices between verses.

Two loose jam sessions then formed. "Jam #1" featured the Band minus Richard Manuel playing with Neil Young, Ronnie Wood, and Eric Clapton on guitar, Dr. John on piano, Paul Butterfield on harmonica, and Ringo Starr on drums. It was followed by "Jam #2" with the same personnel minus Robertson and Danko. Stephen Stills, who showed up late, took a guitar solo and Carl Radle joined on bass.

The Band then came out at around 2:15 am to perform an encore, "Don't Do It". It was the last time the group performed under the name "the Band" with its classic lineup. The five joined on stage at a Rick Danko concert in 1978. The Band reformed without Robertson in 1980 and headlined at The Roxy in Los Angeles with Scottish group Blue supporting, guests were Dr. John and Joe Cocker. Rick Danko later performed at various Los Angeles venues along with Blue, and at his invitation, they recorded their LA Sessions album at Shangri-La Studios.

== Film production ==
=== Concert filming ===
Robertson initially wanted to record the concert on 16 mm film. He recruited Martin Scorsese to direct based on his use of music in Mean Streets. Under Scorsese, the film grew into a full-scale studio production with seven 35 mm cameras.

The cameras were operated by several cinematographers: Michael Chapman (Raging Bull), László Kovács (Easy Rider, Five Easy Pieces), Vilmos Zsigmond (Close Encounters of the Third Kind), David Myers (THX 1138), Bobby Byrne (Smokey and the Bandit), Michael Watkins, and Hiro Narita. The stage and lighting were designed by Boris Leven, who had been the production designer on such musical films as West Side Story and The Sound of Music. With Bill Graham's assistance, the set from the San Francisco Opera's production of La traviata was rented as a backdrop for the stage. Crystal chandeliers were also hung over the stage.

John Simon, who ran the rehearsals for the show, would give Scorsese details as to who sang what and who soloed when for each song. Scorsese meticulously storyboarded the songs, setting up lighting and camera cues to fit the lyrics of the songs. But despite his planning, in the rigors of the live concert setting, with the loud rock music and the hours spent filming the show, there were unscripted film reloads and camera malfunctions. It was not possible for all songs to be covered. At one point, all the cameras, except László Kovács', were shut down for a scheduled film reload as Muddy Waters was to perform "Mannish Boy". Kovács, frustrated by Scorsese's constant instructions, had removed his headset earlier in the evening and had not heard the orders to stop filming. As Scorsese frantically tried to get other cameras up, Kovács was already rolling and able to capture the iconic song by the blues legend. "It was just luck," Scorsese recalled in the DVD documentary, The Last Waltz Revisited.

Notably omitted from the film is Stephen Stills, who only performed in a jam session. Also omitted were performances by poets Lenore Kandel, Robert Duncan, Freewheelin' Frank Reynolds, Emmett Grogan, Diane DiPrima and Sweet William. Both jam sessions were omitted from the film entirely.

=== Unexpected negotiations with Dylan ===
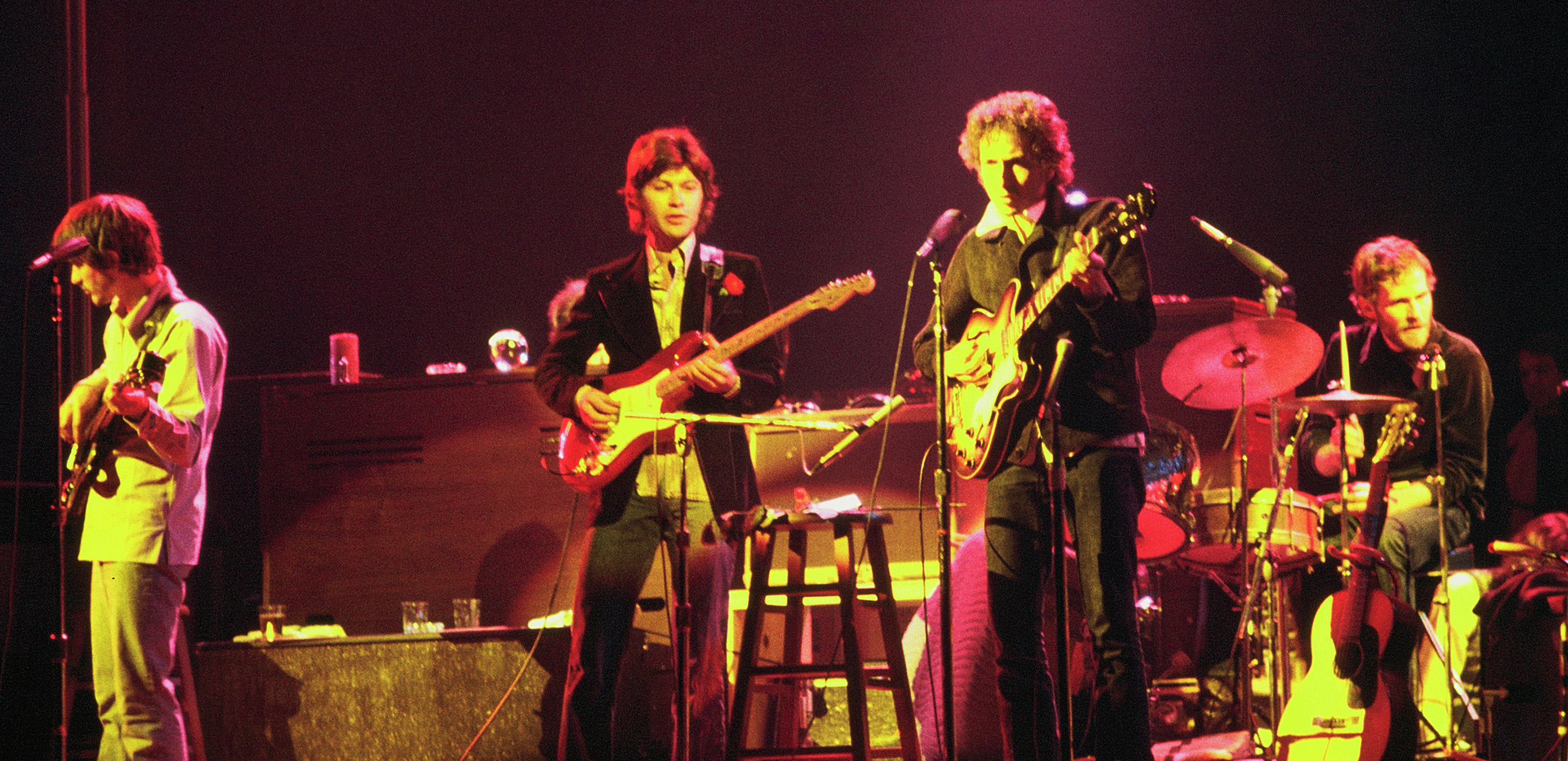
Dylan and the Band, 1974

While Bob Dylan had agreed to perform at the concert, which was being filmed, he decided during the intermission that he did not want his own performance filmed after all. He feared it might detract from his film Renaldo and Clara, which he directed during the Rolling Thunder Revue tour, which ended months earlier. However, Warner Bros. had agreed to finance Last Waltz only if Dylan would appear in it.

Levon Helm said that Scorsese "went nuts" upon hearing that Dylan changed his mind, while "Robbie became totally pale." More than a million dollars would have been lost without Dylan's performance in the film, said Helm. Jonathan Taplin, the Band's manager and producer of the film, was also beside himself, knowing that he had no influence over Dylan. He, along with Robertson and Scorsese, then went to Graham: "Bill, you're going to have to go and talk to Bob." They knew that Graham had worked with Dylan before, such as during Graham's SNACK Benefit Concert a year earlier. They wanted Graham to explain to Dylan how dire the situation was, said Helm.

As Graham walked toward Dylan's dressing room, he tried to reassure them, "Don't worry, I'm gonna make it happen." As they waited, there were frantic backstage negotiations between Graham and Dylan, recalls Helm:

Man, they were all biting their nails. I think Bill really pleaded with Bob for us, for the sake of the history of it all. He was in there for a couple of minutes, but it seemed like an hour. No one could believe this. With about five minutes left, word came down that the last two songs in Bob's part of the show could be filmed, and only the last two. Bill Graham saved their asses that night.

Robertson also assured Dylan that the concert film's release would be delayed until after his film. Taplin later said that "Bill did the greatest thing that night. In a sense, he really saved the day for us."

At one point during Dylan's performance, Robertson states that Lou Kemp, a close friend of Dylan, said "We're not filming this." And Bill just said, "Get out of here, or I'll kill you." Graham told him "This is history, don't mess with it!" Kemp backed off. To add to the confusion, Scorsese said that when Dylan got on stage, the sound was so loud he did not know what to shoot: "Fortunately, we got our cues right and we shot the two songs that were used in the film."

According to Kemp, "More or less, Bob got his way. I think they shot a little more than he wanted but they didn't shoot as much as they wanted. As it ended up, everybody came out whole. Robertson was also satisfied:

Oh, we'll go through all this bullshit and in the end, we'll shoot it. I knew the game very well. Thank God for Bill Graham. In the end, it was shot. And it looked staggering. He looked amazing in the film, Bobby Dylan. Almost like a Christ figure. A Christ in a white hat. I mean, what more could you ask for?

=== Drug use ===
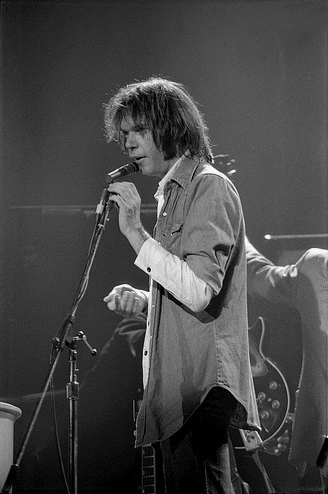
Guest Neil Young at a 1976 concert in the United States.

Scorsese has said he was using cocaine heavily during this period. Drugs were present in large quantities during the concert. During post-production Neil Young's manager insisted that a large blob of cocaine on the guitarist's nose be removed with special effects. Scorsese reportedly pushed back, defending the cocaine's appearance as "rock & roll." When Young's management insisted, the post-production team created a special effect—known in-house as “the traveling booger matte.” This rotoscoped matte hovered over Young's face for the duration of his appearance on-screen, obscuring the cocaine blob that clung to his nose.

=== Post-concert production ===
Following the concert, Scorsese filmed for several days on an MGM studio soundstage, with the Band, the Staple Singers and Emmylou Harris. The Band's performance of "The Weight" with the Staple Singers was included in the film instead of the concert version. The Band and Harris performed "Evangeline", which was also included in the film. Interviews with group members were conducted by Scorsese at the Band's Shangri-La Studio in Malibu, California. Additionally, Robertson composed "The Last Waltz Suite", parts of which were used as a film score. Finally, according to musical director John Simon, during post-production, the live recording was altered to clean up "playing mistakes, out-of-tune singing, bad horn-balance in the remote truck. Only Levon's part was retained in its entirety."

Due to Scorsese's commitments on New York, New York and another documentary, American Boy: A Profile of Steven Prince, the film's release was delayed until 1978.

During the editing process, Scorsese and Robertson became friends, and frequently collaborated on further projects, with Robertson acting as music producer and consultant on Raging Bull, The King of Comedy, The Color of Money, Casino, Gangs of New York, The Departed, Shutter Island, The Wolf of Wall Street, Silence, The Irishman and Killers of the Flower Moon.

== Reception ==
=== Critical reception ===
More than being a collection of impressively filmed and virtuosically mixed 'live' songs, "The Last Waltz" ranks as probably the finest record of a rock concert ever put on film.

— Hartford Courant

The film has been hailed critically, listed among the greatest concert films. On review aggregator Rotten Tomatoes, the film holds an approval rating of 98% based on 50 reviews, with an average rating of 8.60/10. The website's critical consensus reads, "Among one of, if not the best rock movie ever made, The Last Waltz is a revealing, electrifying view of the classic band at their height." Chicago Tribune film critic Michael Wilmington calls it "the greatest rock concert movie ever made – and maybe the best rock movie, period". Terry Lawson of the Detroit Free Press comments that "This is one of the great movie experiences." Total Film considers it "the greatest concert film ever shot". Janet Maslin of The New York Times gave it a negative review, stating that it "articulates so little of the end-of-an-era feeling it hints at ... that it's impossible to view the Last Waltz as anything but an also-ran." However, The New York Times in 2003 placed the film on its Best 1000 Movies Ever list, while Rolling Stone called it the "Greatest Concert Movie of All Time".

The New Yorker critic Pauline Kael wrote that "no American movie [made that year] was as full of the 'joy of making cinema.'"

Music critic Robert Christgau gives the soundtrack a "B+", saying "the movie improves when you can't see it." He praises the blues numbers by Muddy Waters and Paul Butterfield, the horn arrangements by Allen Toussaint, and the "blistering if messy" guitar duet by Robertson and Eric Clapton. Film critic Roger Ebert awarded the film three stars out of a possible four, noting that although "the film is such a revealing document of a time", it also suggested the musicians had reached the end of their careers.

=== Criticism by Levon Helm ===
Levon Helm, in his 1993 autobiography This Wheel's on Fire, expresses serious reservations about Scorsese's handling of the film, claiming that Scorsese and Robertson (who produced the film) conspired to make the Band look like Robertson's sidemen. He states that Robertson, who is depicted singing powerful backing vocals, was actually singing into a microphone that was turned off throughout most of the concert (a typical practice during their live performances).

Helm was also dissatisfied with what he regarded as Manuel and Hudson's minimal screen time and he claims most of the band members never received any money for the various home videos, DVDs and soundtracks released by Warner Bros. after the project.

=== Appreciation by Robbie Robertson ===
We saluted one another like we had just pulled off one of the best musical celebrations in rock 'n' roll history. It really, really does not get any better than this.

— Robbie Robertson

Robertson said he was relieved when the concert ended, as he was constantly worried that something would go wrong, as it did when Dylan suddenly backed out of being filmed. To all the people involved, he said "Thank God we got through it." He recalls that all the cameramen were hugging one another, feeling they had succeeded in capturing a unique rock concert on film.

He also thanked Graham for producing the concert at Winterland, where the Band had its debut in 1969:

I remember seeing Bill and I was thinking, "God, you did it, Bill. Well, everybody did it." But Bill did it. We did it in his home. Like, "Whose house are we going to shoot at? Bill's house." Because it was his house, I felt in my heart like he had really done this thing. . . He was proud of it. and I was proud of him for being proud of it.

== Home video releases ==
For the concert's 25th anniversary in 2002, the film was remastered and a new theatrical print was made for a limited release to promote the release of the DVD and four-CD box set of the film soundtrack. It opened in San Francisco's Castro Theatre, with the release later expanded to 15 theaters.

The DVD features a commentary track by Robertson and Scorsese, a featurette, Revisiting The Last Waltz, and a gallery of images from the concert, the studio filming and the film premiere. A bonus scene is footage of "Jam #2", which is cut short because they had run out of replacement sound synchronizers for the cameras after ten hours of continuous filming.

The original 2002 DVD release was packaged as a "special edition". In addition to the extra features on the disc, the Amaray case came in a foil-embossed cardboard sleeve, and inside was an eight-page booklet, featuring a five-page essay by Robertson entitled "The End of a Musical Journey". Also included was a US$5 rebate coupon for the four-CD box set. In 2005, the DVD was re-issued with different artwork and stripped of the outer foil packaging, inner booklet and coupon; the disc's contents remained unchanged.

In 2006, The Last Waltz was among the first eight titles released in Sony's high definition Blu-ray format. The soundtracks on the Blu-ray release consist of an uncompressed 5.1 Linear PCM track, a very high fidelity format, and a standard Dolby Digital 5.1 track.

On March 29, 2022, The Criterion Collection released a new 4K digital restoration, supervised and approved by Scorsese, with Dolby Vision HDR and a 5.1 surround DTS-HD Master Audio soundtrack, supervised and approved by Robertson.

== Albums ==
The original soundtrack album was a three-LP album released on April 16, 1978 (later as a two-disc CD). It has many songs not in the film, including "Down South in New Orleans" with Bobby Charles and Dr. John on guitar, "Tura Lura Lural (That's an Irish Lullaby)" by Van Morrison, "Life is a Carnival" by the Band, and "I Don't Believe You (She Acts Like We Never Have Met)" by Bob Dylan. John Casado designed the packaging and logotype trademark.

In 2002, a four-CD box set was released, as was a DVD-Audio edition. Robbie Robertson produced the album, remastering all the songs. The set includes 16 previously unreleased songs from the concert, as well as takes from rehearsals. Among the additions are Louis Jordan's "Caldonia" by Muddy Waters, the concert version of "The Weight", "Jam #1" and "Jam #2" in their entirety, and extended sets with Joni Mitchell and Bob Dylan.

The soundtrack recordings underwent post-concert production featuring heavy use of overdubbing and re-sequencing. Bootleg collectors have circulated an original line recording of the concert as a more accurate and complete document of the event. It includes songs not available in the film or the official album releases, including "Georgia on My Mind", "King Harvest (Has Surely Come)", the complete "Chest Fever" and the live version of "Evangeline".

== Performances ==
Performance for The Last Waltz
Song	Artist(s)	Concert	Film	1978 album	2002 album
"Up on Cripple Creek"	The Band	1	3	2	
"The Shape I'm In"	The Band	2	4	14	3
"It Makes No Difference"	The Band	3	6	8	4
"Life Is a Carnival"	The Band	4	—	19	6
"This Wheel's on Fire"	The Band	5	—	—	10
"W.S. Walcott Medicine Show"	The Band	6	—	—	26
"Georgia on My Mind"	The Band with John Simon	7	—	—	—
"Ophelia"	The Band	8	20	16	18
"King Harvest (Has Surely Come)"	The Band	9	—		
"The Night They Drove Old Dixie Down"	The Band	10	12	10	29
"Stage Fright"	The Band	11	10	5	14
"Rag Mama Rag"	The Band	12	—		15
"Who Do You Love?"	Ronnie Hawkins	13	5	3	5
"Such a Night"	Dr. John	14	8	9	7
"Down South in New Orleans"	Bobby Charles and Dr. John	15	—	15	9
"Mystery Train"	Paul Butterfield	16	15	11	
"Caldonia"	Muddy Waters with Pinetop Perkins, Bob Margolin and Paul Butterfield	17	—		12
"Mannish Boy"	Muddy Waters with Pinetop Perkins, Bob Margolin and Paul Butterfield	18	16	12	13
"All Our Past Times"	Eric Clapton	19	—		16
"Further on Up the Road"	Eric Clapton	20	17	13	17
"Helpless"	Neil Young with Joni Mitchell	21	9	4	19
"Four Strong Winds"	Neil Young	22	—		20
"Coyote"	Joni Mitchell	23	14	6	21
"Shadows and Light"	Joni Mitchell	24	—		22
"Furry Sings the Blues"	Joni Mitchell	25	—		23
"Dry Your Eyes"	Neil Diamond with Dennis St. John	26	13	7	25
"Tura Lura Lural (That's an Irish Lullaby)"	Van Morrison with John Simon	27	—	17	27
"Caravan"	Van Morrison	28	21	18	28
"Acadian Driftwood"	The Band, Neil Young and Joni Mitchell	29	—		24
Poem	Emmett Grogan	30	—		—
Poem	Bill "Sweet William" Fritsch (Hells Angels)	31	—		—
"JOY!"	Lenore Kandel	32	—		—
Introduction to The Canterbury Tales in Chaucerian dialect	Michael McClure	33	7	—	—
"Get Yer Cut Throat Off My Knife"/"Revolutionary Letter #4"/"The Fire Guardian"	Diane di Prima	34	—	—	—
"Transgressing the Real"	Robert Duncan	35	—	—	—
Poem	"Freewheeling" Frank Reynolds (Hells Angels)	36	—	—	—
"Loud Prayer"	Lawrence Ferlinghetti	37	22	—	—
"Genetic Method"/"Chest Fever"	The Band	38	19	—	30
"The Last Waltz Suite: Evangeline" (concert version)	The Band with John Simon	39	—	—	—
"The Weight" (concert version)	The Band	40	—	—	8
"Baby, Let Me Follow You Down"	Bob Dylan	41	—	20	31
"Hazel"	Bob Dylan	42	—	—	32
"I Don't Believe You (She Acts Like We Never Have Met)"	Bob Dylan	43	—	21	33
"Forever Young"	Bob Dylan	44	23	22	34
"Baby, Let Me Follow You Down" (reprise)	Bob Dylan	45	24	23	35
"I Shall Be Released"	Bob Dylan and The Band, with guests (including Ronnie Wood and Ringo Starr)	46	25	24	36
"Jam #1"	Neil Young, Ronnie Wood, Eric Clapton, Robbie Robertson, Paul Butterfield, Dr. John, Garth Hudson, Rick Danko, Ringo Starr, and Levon Helm	47	—		37
"Jam #2"	Neil Young, Ronnie Wood, Eric Clapton, Stephen Stills, Paul Butterfield, Dr. John, Garth Hudson, Carl Radle, Ringo Starr and Levon Helm	48	—		38
"Don't Do It"	The Band	49	1	—	39
"Greensleeves"	The Band	50	—		40
"Theme from The Last Waltz" (studio)	The Band	—	2	1	
"The Weight" (studio version)	The Band and The Staple Singers	—	11	29	44
"Evangeline" (studio version)	The Band and Emmylou Harris	—	18	27	42

== Performers ==
=== The Band ===
- Rick Danko – bass guitar, fiddle, vocals
- Levon Helm – drums, mandolin, vocals
- Garth Hudson – organ, piano, accordion, synthesizers, soprano saxophone, clavinet
- Richard Manuel – piano, organ, drums, clavinet, dobro, vocals
- Robbie Robertson – guitar, piano, vocals

=== Horn section ===
- Rich Cooper – trumpet, flugelhorn
- James Gordon – flute, tenor saxophone, clarinet
- Jerry Hey – trumpet, flugelhorn
- Howard Johnson – tuba, baritone saxophone, flugelhorn, bass clarinet
- Charlie Keagle – clarinet, flute, saxophone
- Tom Malone – trombone, euphonium, alto flute
- Larry Packer – electric violin
- Horns arranged by Henry Glover, Garth Hudson, Howard Johnson, Tom Malone, John Simon, and Allen Toussaint

=== Other musicians ===
- Bob Margolin – guitar (Muddy Waters)
- Dennis St. John – drums (Neil Diamond)
- John Simon – piano on "Tura Lura Lural", "Georgia On My Mind", and "The Last Waltz Suite: Evangeline" (concert version)

=== Guests ===
- Paul Butterfield – harmonica, vocals
- Bobby Charles – vocals
- Eric Clapton – guitar, vocals
- Neil Diamond – guitar, vocals
- Dr. John – piano, guitar, congas, vocals
- Bob Dylan – guitar, vocals
- Lawrence Ferlinghetti - poet
- Bill Graham – master of ceremonies
- Emmylou Harris – acoustic guitar, vocals
- Ronnie Hawkins – vocals
- Michael McClure – poet
- Joni Mitchell – acoustic guitar, vocals
- Van Morrison – vocals
- Pinetop Perkins – piano, vocals
- Carl Radle – bass
- Cleotha Staples – backing vocals
- Mavis Staples – vocals
- Roebuck "Pops" Staples – guitar, vocals
- Yvonne Staples – backing vocals
- Ringo Starr – drums
- Stephen Stills – guitar
- Muddy Waters – vocals
- Ronnie Wood – guitar
- Neil Young – guitars, harmonica, vocals

== Charts ==
Chart performance for video releases of The Last Waltz
Chart	Peak
German Music DVD (Media Control)	66
Swedish Music DVD (Sverigetopplistan)	2
UK Music Video DVD (OCC)	1

== Certifications ==
Sales certifications for video releases of The Last Waltz
Region	Certification	Certified units/sales
United Kingdom (BPI)	3× Platinum	150,000^{*}
^{*} Sales figures based on certification alone.

== Notes ==
Fricke, David (November 2001). The Last Waltz (liner notes). The Band. Warner Bros.
