= Daniel and the Sacred Harp =

Song by The Band

from the album Stage Fright
- Released: August 17, 1970
- Genre: Rock
- Length: 4:06
- Label: Capitol
- Songwriter(s): Robbie Robertson
- Producer(s): The Band

"Daniel and the Sacred Harp" is a song written by Robbie Robertson that was first released by The Band on their 1970 album Stage Fright. It has been covered by such artists as Barrence Whitfield.

== Themes ==
As with several songs on Stage Fright, such as the title track, "Daniel and the Sacred Harp" reflects the difficulties the Band was going through at the time of the album's development. The theme of "Daniel and the Sacred Harp" is "a loss of integrity." The lyrics tell a story similar to the Robert Johnson myth. They also have antecedents in the story of Faust. They tell of a man who acquires a famous harp, but loses his soul to get it. Robertson has claimed that the inspiration for the song came from his early days as a guitarist, when he was "stealing" techniques from earlier guitarists such as Fred Carter, Jr., Roy Buchanan and Howlin' Wolf. Robertson has also described the song is about "greed in the context of Christian mythology." Billboard Magazine used the song as an example of the religious themed songs that were becoming popular at the time. He has also noted that he was into Sacred Harp style singing, which was in the back of his mind when he wrote the song.

Beyond just the loss of a musician's soul, music critic Nick DeRiso hears in the song a theme of loss of innocence, which would have been particularly meaningful to the 1960s generation as they moved into the 1970s. He also hears the song reflecting the fate of most famous bands, who pay for their fame through the effects of bad choices, bad management decisions and other problems. Band drummer and vocalist Levon Helm acknowledges that the theme of the song is "selling your soul for music." According to author Neil Minturn, "Daniel and the Sacred Harp," earlier band songs "The Night They Drove Old Dixie Down" and "King Harvest (Has Surely Come)" and another song from Stage Fright, "The W.S. Walcott Medicine Show," all recount episodes of American history."

== Lyrics and music ==
The song has an unusual structure, in that the first lines appear to be a refrain, but these lines appear only at the beginning and at the very end of the song, as a framing device:

Daniel, Daniel and the sacred harp
Dancing through the clover
Daniel, Daniel would you mind?
If I look it over.

A narrator, who is a contemporary of Daniel opens up the story and sings that only a few people are permitted to play the sacred harp and he didn't think Daniel was one of them, so he asks Daniel if he is "one of the chosen few" and how he received the harp. Daniel then sings his story about how he saved up silver to be able to purchase the harp, even though he wasn't one of the few permitted to own it. After three years, the seller returns with the harp from the Sea of Galilee. He then sings that although he did not make the deal out "of personal greed" he paid a heavy price, and his father tells him that he won the harp but is now "lost in sin." He sings that he has lost his shadow, which the music makes clear is a metaphor for losing his soul, before the opening lines return.

DeRiso describes the music as "a kind of Appalachian lament." Richard Manuel sings the part of Daniel, while Levon Helm sings the narrator's part. Although Helm was normally the Band's drummer and Manuel the pianist, this is one of several songs on which Manuel plays drums and Helm plays guitar. Garth Hudson plays pump organ and Rick Danko plays acoustic bass and fiddle. Robertson plays an autoharp.

== Reception ==
Band biographer Peter Viney regards "Daniel and the Sacred Harp" as "one of The Band’s greatest songs". Q critic John Bauldie praised the song for displaying "the best of The Band's trademark interactive vocals." Rolling Stone Album Guide critic Paul Evans regards the song as "Robertson at his most haunting." The New Rolling Stone Album Guide critic Mark Kemp regards it as a "highlight" of Stage Fright which reveals "a growing sense of anxiety and cynicism. Bob Budler of Copley News Service also rated it one of the best songs on Stage Fright Rolling Stone Magazine critic Greil Marcus criticized for lacking the unity of the songs on the Band's first two albums; however, he did praise Danko's bass and fiddle playing. Author Jason Schneider describes the song as "overwrought."

"Daniel and the Sacred Harp" has been released on several of The Band's compilation albums. It was included on the 1978 album Anthology. It was later included on the 1989 album To Kingdom Come: The Definitive Collection. It was also included on the box sets Across the Great Divide and A Musical History.

The Band never played "Daniel and the Sacred Harp" live.

== Performers ==
- Levon Helm – 1st lead vocal, 12 string acoustic guitar
- Richard Manuel – 2nd lead vocal, drums
- Rick Danko – double bass, violin
- Robbie Robertson – electric guitar, autoharp
- Garth Hudson – pump organ

== Other versions ==
An alternate take of "Daniel and the Sacred Harp" was included on the 2000 rerelease of Stage Fright. Marcus described this version as "an intimate drama" in which Helm hums the music that Danko plays on the fiddle on the official version. Marcus states that in this version "you can hear people reaching out to each other, but you can hear their estrangement before and after you hear them reaching out."

Barrence Whitfield and Tom Russell covered "Daniel and the Sacred Harp" on the 1993 album Cowboy Mambo. Allmusic critic Jeff Burger describes the choice to include the song part of what gives the album an "inspired program of tunes." Billboard Magazine regards it as a highlight of the album and says that the performance "positively pump[s] with heartfelt emotion."
