= Live at Watkins Glen =

Live album by the Band
- Released: April 4, 1995
- Recorded: August 17, 1969 – July 28, 1973
- Genre: Rock
- Length: 44:36
- Label: Capitol
- Producer: The Band

The Band chronology
Across the Great Divide (1994)	Live at Watkins Glen (1995)	High on the Hog (1996)

Professional ratings
Review scores
Source	Rating
AllMusic	2/5 stars

Live at Watkins Glen is a 1995 album by the Band, presented by Capitol Records as a live album from the Summer Jam at Watkins Glen rock festival held outside Watkins Glen, New York, on July 28, 1973, in front of 600,000 people. Garth Hudson's organ solo, "Too Wet to Work", and the plainly titled "Jam" come from the actual Watkins Glen concert, as does the introduction of the group by Bill Graham. The former track appears on the out-of-print 1994 box set Across the Great Divide, but the latter track is only present on the Watkins Glen disc. The remainder of the tracks are two studio outtakes with overdubbed crowd noise, "Back to Memphis" and "Endless Highway", plus five tracks from the Academy of Music shows in December 1971 and "Don't Ya Tell Henry" from the Woodstock festival in 1969. The two studio outtakes are available on the 2001 re-release of Moondog Matinee, without the crowd overdubs. The Academy of Music tracks are available on the 2001 two-CD re-release of Rock of Ages as "previously unavailable" tracks.

The album was originally prepared by the Band in 1973 and was supposed to be released in 1974 under the title Is Everybody Wet? but its release was cancelled.

== Track listing ==
All tracks are written by Robbie Robertson unless otherwise noted

No.	Title	Writer(s)	Source notes	Length
1.	"Back to Memphis"	Chuck Berry	March - July 1973 at Bearsville Sound Studio, Bearsville, NY & Capitol Studios, Los Angeles, CA with crowd noise overdubbed; Bill Graham intro from Watkins Glen	6:16
2.	"Endless Highway"		October 1972 at Bearsville Sound Studio, Bearsville, NY with crowd noise overdubbed	5:18
3.	"I Shall Be Released"	Bob Dylan	December 30, 1971 at Academy of Music, New York, NY	4:24
4.	"Loving You Is Sweeter Than Ever"	Ivy Jo Hunter, Stevie Wonder	December 29, 1971 at Academy of Music, New York, NY	3:25
5.	"Too Wet to Work"	Garth Hudson	July 28, 1973 at Summer Jam at Watkins Glen, NY	3:29
6.	"Don't Ya Tell Henry"	Dylan	August 17, 1969 at Woodstock Music and Art Fair, Bethel, NY	4:01
7.	"The Rumor"		December 30, 1971 at Academy of Music, New York, NY	4:57
8.	"Time to Kill"		December 28, 1971 at Academy of Music, New York, NY	4:54
9.	"Jam"	Rick Danko, Levon Helm, Hudson, Richard Manuel, Robertson	July 28, 1973 at Summer Jam Watkins Glen, NY	3:02
10.	"Up on Cripple Creek"		December 30, 1971 at Academy of Music, New York, NY	4:48

== Personnel ==
The Band

- Rick Danko – bass, vocals
- Levon Helm – drums, mandolin, vocals
- Garth Hudson – organ, clavinet
- Richard Manuel – piano, drums, clavinet, vocals
- Robbie Robertson – guitars

Additional personnel

- Wayne Watkins – reissue producer
