= David Yaffe =

David Yaffe is the name of:

- David Yaffe (music critic) (born 1973), American music critic and humanities scholar
- David Yaffe, British Marxian theorist
