= Christmas Must Be Tonight =

Song by the Band

from the album Islands
- Released: March 1977
- Recorded: 1975
- Length: 3:35
- Label: Capitol
- Songwriter: Robbie Robertson
- Producer: The Band

"Christmas Must Be Tonight" is a song by Canadian-American rock group the Band, written by Robbie Robertson. It was released on their seventh studio album Islands (1977). Like much of the material on Islands, the song was an outtake from an earlier session, originating from the sessions for Northern Lights – Southern Cross (1975). Though the song was originally intended for release as a single in December 1975, Capitol Records' lack of interest led to the song remaining unreleased until its inclusion on Islands.

== Background ==
"Christmas Must Be Tonight" is sung by the band's bassist Rick Danko, and is written from the point of view of an observer to the birth of Jesus. The song was inspired by, and written soon after, the birth of Robertson's son Sebastian.

== Reception ==
"Christmas Must Be Tonight" has received positive reviews from critics, and is considered by many to be a highlight of Islands. American Songwriter praises Danko's vocal performance on the song, stating it "evok[es] a touching humility in the presence of [a] miracle." The song appeared at number 40 in The New York Times' list of the top 100 Christmas songs. In the biography Across the Great Divide: The Band and America, writer Barney Hoskyns referred to the song as one of Islands' "only redeeming moments of musical magic".

"Christmas Must Be Tonight" remains a staple of holiday radio stations and has been covered by other artists including The Explorers Club, Goose, Train, and Ronnie Hawkins. Elton John selected the song for inclusion on the Holiday-themed compilation album Elton John's Christmas Party (2005).
