= Elton John's Christmas Party =

Compilation album (Christmas) by Various Artists
- Released: 10 November 2005; 10 October 2006 (re-release)
- Genre: Christmas
- Length: 75:12 (2005); 53:21 (2006)
- Label: Hear Music (2005); Hip-O (2006)
- Producer: Elton John, Merck Mercuriadis, Marty Maidenberg

Professional ratings
Review scores
Source	Rating
AllMusic	3.5/5 stars

Elton John's Christmas Party is a Christmas-themed compilation album by British musician Elton John. It features his 1973 Christmas single, "Step into Christmas", and a new duet with Joss Stone, "Calling It Christmas". According to John's introduction in the liner notes, as opposed to doing an album of his versions of already famous songs, he chose to do a compilation with some of his favorite holiday songs by other artists.

== Release and re-release ==
The album was initially released exclusively to Hear Music outlets in Starbucks coffee shops on 10 November 2005; the sales campaign pledged to donate two dollars from every sale to the Elton John AIDS Foundation. The following year, on 10 October 2006, the album was re-released to the general market; however, six songs were omitted from the new release.

The Pet Shop Boys song "It Doesn't Often Snow at Christmas" was originally released in 1997 to members of their fan club, and was not available anywhere else prior to this release.

== Original track listing ==
1. "Step into Christmas" – Elton John
2. "Feliz Navidad" – El Vez
3. "Frosty the Snowman" – The Ronettes
4. "Santa Claus Is Comin' to Town" – Bruce Springsteen
5. "The Man with All the Toys" – The Beach Boys
6. "A Change at Christmas (Say It Isn't So)" – The Flaming Lips
7. "It Doesn't Often Snow at Christmas" – Pet Shop Boys
8. "Spotlight on Christmas" – Rufus Wainwright
9. "Jingle Bell Rock" – The Ventures
10. "Run Rudolph Run" – Chuck Berry
11. "Rudolph the Red-Nosed Reindeer" – The Crystals
12. "Playa's Ball" – OutKast
13. "Merry Christmas Baby" – Otis Redding
14. "Christmas Island" – Jimmy Buffett
15. "St. Patrick's Day" – John Mayer
16. "Please Come Home for Christmas" – Eagles
17. "Christmas Must Be Tonight" – The Band
18. "2000 Miles" – The Pretenders
19. "December Will Be Magic Again" – Kate Bush
20. "New Year's Day" – U2
21. "Calling It Christmas" – Elton John and Joss Stone

== 2006 track listing ==
1. "Step into Christmas" – Elton John
2. "Feliz Navidad" – El Vez
3. "The Man with All the Toys" – The Beach Boys
4. "A Change at Christmas (Say It Isn't So)" – The Flaming Lips
5. "It Doesn't Often Snow at Christmas" – Pet Shop Boys
6. "Spotlight on Christmas" – Rufus Wainwright
7. "Jingle Bell Rock" – The Ventures
8. "Run Rudolph Run" – Chuck Berry
9. "Merry Christmas Baby" – Otis Redding
10. "Christmas Island" – Jimmy Buffett
11. "Christmas Must Be Tonight" – The Band
12. "2000 Miles" – The Pretenders
13. "December Will Be Magic Again" – Kate Bush
14. "New Year's Day" – U2
15. "Calling It Christmas" – Elton John and Joss Stone
