= When You Awake =

Song by The Band

from the album The Band
- Released: September 22, 1969
- Genre: Rock
- Length: 3:13
- Label: Capitol
- Songwriter(s): Richard Manuel, Robbie Robertson
- Producer(s): John Simon

"When You Awake" is a song written by Robbie Robertson and Richard Manuel that was first released on The Band's 1969 self-titled album The Band. A live performance was included on the Bob Dylan and The Band live album Before the Flood.

== Lyrics and music ==
"When You Awake" is a ballad. The lyrics concern a young boy who received advice from "Ollie," who may be a friend or relative. Ollie tells the boy how difficult life can be; that the boy is a fool, that "it's a mean old world," to "Be careful where you step and watch what you eat." The boy turns to his grandfather for comfort, His grandfather's words comfort the boy by assuring him of his love, but do not contradict the harsh words from Ollie. Music critic Barney Hoskyns suggests that Ollie and the grandfather may be the same person. Robertson has stated that the song "is the story about someone who passes something on to you, and you pass it on to someone else. But it's something you take to heart and carry with you your whole life." According to music critic Nick DeRiso, the lyrics are more about feeling and emotion than literal detail. DeRiso interprets the final verse as the boy singing after he has grown up and reflecting back on the advice he received long ago. The last lines of the song tweak famous lines from the traditional gospel song "On the Rock Where Moses Stood":

And if I thought it would do any good
I'd stand on the Rock where Moses stood.

Rick Danko sings the lead vocal. Robertson plays a Merle Travis-sounding riff on guitar, Levon Helm plays acoustic guitar, and Garth Hudson and Manuel play organ and drums respectively in a ragtime style. Robertson has said that the guitar part was made up of combinations of notes that were not real chords. As a result, the melody didn't sound good when translated to piano, which is why Manuel, normally the group's pianist, moved to drums. Associated Press writer Mary Campbell heard an influence from Bob Dylan's music in "the way the tune moves forward."

== Reception ==
Critics are divided on the merits of the song. Allmusic critic Thomas Ward considers it "one of the lesser songs" on The Band and considers some of the lyrics "trite" and the melody "rather unengaging (although not unattractive)." Ward compares it unfavorably to another Manuel-Robertson song on The Band, "Whispering Pines." Hoskyns calls it "engaging," particularly praising Danko's "folksy vocal." Billboard Magazine regarded the song as one of The Band's "most haunting ballads." Billboard described Danko's vocal performance as "potent." Band biographer Peter Viney describes it as "a strange song in that it breaks up the full blast Americana of the three preceding tracks [on The Band] and the following one. Listen to it again, and it hardly sounds like any kind of rock song at all. Like all their best tracks you grab images as you relisten but you're hard put to connect these images together." DeRiso praises how Danko's vocal provides "more than simple emotion, as he climbs to impossible heights, then storms back down with the greatest of ease, but also real insight and no small amount of wit."

"When You Awake" appeared on several of the Band's compilation albums. It appeared as one of the bonus tracks on the 1995 reissue of The Best of the Band. It also appeared on the box set A Musical History.

== Other performances ==
The Band played "When You Awake" live on the Bob Dylan and The Band 1974 Tour. When performing the song live, Danko would back away from the microphone at the end of the song to mimic the fade out at the end of the studio recording. A version of the song was included on the 1974 live album Before the Flood. Hoskyns criticizes the performance on Before the Flood as he believes that Danko's voice was worn out from all the previous performances. Critic John Nogowski also criticizes Danko's vocal, and the song itself, as "the weakest on the record."

Danko performed a solo version of "When You Awake" on acoustic guitar for the VH1 special Classic Albums - The Band. In this version, he changes Ollie's gender from "he" to "she." This has supported speculation that "Ollie" was meant to represent Danko's mother Leyola, or Ole for short.
