= The Telegraph (magazine) =

Periodical about the work of Bob Dylan

The Telegraph was a fan-oriented periodical about the work of Bob Dylan and musicians associated with Dylan. It was published in Manchester, England, in 56 issues from November 1981 until the "Winter" (presumably the final quarter) of 1997. By that date, it had a circulation of about 3,500, of which England accounted for roughly half.

Through 1983, approximately bi-monthly issues were dated by month; thereafter, each issue was designated by the year and one of the four seasons; issues numbered three or four per year, until the final two years, in which a total of three appeared.

The publisher and primary writer was John Bauldie, who died in 1996. A website exists about the periodical and 15 Dylan-related books, of which 13 were published by The Telegraph. On the magazine website, Bauldie claimed that Dylan was a regular reader of The Telegraph.
