= Chest Fever =

Song by The Band

from the album Music from Big Pink
- Released: July 1, 1968
- Genre: Psychedelic rock, roots rock
- Length: 5:18
- Label: Capitol
- Songwriter: Robbie Robertson
- Producer: John Simon

"Chest Fever" is a song recorded by the Band on its 1968 debut, Music from Big Pink. It is, according to Peter Viney, a historian of the group, the album track that has appeared on the most subsequent live albums and compilations, second only to "The Weight".

At the Woodstock Festival in 1969, the Band performed on the final day, between Ten Years After and Blood, Sweat, and Tears. They opened the set with the song.

== Music and Lyrics ==
The music for the piece was written by guitarist Robbie Robertson. Total authorship is typically credited solely to Robertson, although the lyrics, according to Levon Helm, were originally improvised by Helm and Richard Manuel, telling the story of a man who becomes sick when he is spurned by the woman he loves.

Robertson has since said the lyrics were nonsensical, used only while the instrumental tracks were recorded. "I'm not sure that I know the words to 'Chest Fever'; I'm not even so sure there are words to 'Chest Fever'." He has also stated the entirety of the song does not make sense.

== "The Genetic Method" ==
The song featured a dramatic solo organ intro played by Garth Hudson. Writing in the 3rd edition of The Rolling Stone Album Guide, Paul Evans stated that "The organ mastery of 'Chest Fever' unleashed the Band's secret weapon, Garth Hudson." The introduction is based on Bach's Toccata and Fugue in D minor. In live performances, this solo evolved into an improvisation drawing from numerous musical styles and lasting several minutes. "When Levon Helm has complained about the share out of royalties at this period, this is the song he quotes," states Viney. "His theme is that Garth's contribution was always grossly under-estimated and under-credited. As he says, 'what do you remember about "Chest Fever" - the lyrics or the organ part?'" Starting around 1970, the organ introduction to "Chest Fever" began to be listed as a separate song called "The Genetic Method", credited solely to Hudson, that precedes "Chest Fever", and it was included as such on their 1972 live album Rock of Ages.

== Later performances ==
Viney notes that despite the death of Richard Manuel, later line-ups of the Band continued to perform "Chest Fever" with Helm singing lead vocals. It "rapidly became an on-stage showpiece for Garth's organ", and as such it was "an essential song".

He says the definitive recordings of the song can be found on Live in Washinton (sic), an Italian bootleg of the group's 1976 King Biscuit Flower Hour performance, or the version on The Complete Last Waltz.

The song has been covered numerous times by bands including Three Dog Night, Sugarloaf, and Widespread Panic. It was also covered by John Mayer during his Battle Studies tour.

The song was chosen by Paul Shaffer and the CBS Orchestra to accompany Bill Murray as Murray emerged from a giant cake during his final appearance on the Late Show with David Letterman on the show's penultimate episode in 2015.

== Studio personnel ==
Credits are adapted from the liner notes of A Musical History.

- Richard Manuel – lead vocals, piano
- Robbie Robertson – electric guitar
- Garth Hudson – Lowrey organ, tenor saxophone
- Rick Danko – bass guitar, violin
- Levon Helm – drums
- John Simon – baritone saxophone

== Select discography ==
=== The Band ===
- Music from Big Pink (1968)
- Rock of Ages (1972)
- Anthology (1978)
- Band Gift Set (1989)
- To Kingdom Come (1989)
- Collection [Castle] (1993)
- Across the Great Divide (1994)
- Most of the Band (1994)
- Greatest Hits (2000)
- Live at Loreley (2001)
- Rock of Ages [Deluxe Edition] (2001)
- The Last Waltz [Box Set] (2002)
- Moon Struck One (2002)
- Very Best Album Ever (2002)
- Music from Big Pink [Bonus Tracks] (2003)
- Rock of Ages [Bonus CD] (2004)
- A Musical History [CD/DVD Box Set] (2005)
- Live at the Academy of Music 1971 [CD/DVD Box Set] (2013)
- Palladium Circles: The Classic NYC Broadcast 1976 (2015)
- Music from Pig Pink [50th Anniversary Edition] (2018)

=== Rick Danko ===
- In Concert (1997)
- Live on Breeze Hill (1999)
- Live at the Lone Star 1984 [with Richard Manuel and Paul Butterfield] (2011)

=== Levon Helm ===
- Ramble at the Ryman (2011)

=== Lighthouse ===
- Suite Feeling (1969)

=== Richard Manuel ===
- Whispering Pines: Live at the Getaway [Japan] (2002)

=== Sugarloaf ===
- Sugarloaf (1970)
- Alive in America (2006)

=== Three Dog Night ===
- Three Dog Night (1968)
- Captured Live at the Forum (1969)
- Three Dog Night: Live (1988)

=== Widespread Panic ===
- Endless Highway: The Music of The Band (2007)
