= Before the Flood (album) =

Live album by Bob Dylan and the Band
- Released: June 20, 1974
- Recorded: February 13–14, 1974, in Los Angeles, except track 4: January 30, 1974, in New York
- Genre: Rock
- Length: 92:26
- Labels: Asylum; Columbia Records (reissue)
- Producers: Bob Dylan; The Band

Bob Dylan chronology
Planet Waves (1974)	Before the Flood (1974)	Blood on the Tracks (1975)

The Band chronology
Planet Waves (1974)	Before the Flood (1974)	The Basement Tapes (1975)

Singles from Before the Flood
- 1. "Most Likely You Go Your Way and I'll Go Mine" Released: August 31, 1974; 2. "It Ain't Me Babe" Released: November 1974

Before the Flood is a live album by American singer-songwriter Bob Dylan and the Band, released on June 20, 1974, on Asylum Records in the United States and Island Records in the United Kingdom. It was Dylan's first live album, although live recordings of earlier performances would later be released. It is the 15th album by Dylan and the seventh by the Band, and documents their joint 1974 American tour. It peaked at No. 3 on the Billboard 200, reached No. 8 on the popular album chart in the UK, and has been certified Platinum by the Recording Industry Association of America.

== Content ==
Dylan and his new record label Asylum had planned professional recordings before the tour began, ten separate sessions in total: three in New York at Madison Square Garden on January 30 and 31; two in Seattle, at the Seattle Center Coliseum on February 9; two in Oakland, California, at the Alameda County Coliseum on February 11; and three in Los Angeles on February 13 and 14. To compile the album, recordings were taken from the final three shows at the Los Angeles Forum in Inglewood, California, with only "Knockin' on Heaven's Door" from New York.

The title of the album is thought to derive from the novel Farn Mabul by Yiddish writer Sholem Asch; Dylan had a personal relationship with Moses Asch, son of Sholem and founder of Folkways Records, a record label hugely influential in the folk music revival.

Dylan and the Band had recorded the studio album Planet Waves prior to the tour. In "Wedding Song", the final recording on the album, He sings, "We can't regain what went down in the flood". Few of the album's songs were incorporated into the tour's setlist, and none are represented on Before the Flood. After the double album release, Dylan signed a new contract with Columbia Records in time for his next studio album, Blood on the Tracks, after returning label president Goddard Lieberson made a determined campaign to get Dylan back from Asylum. The Band continued to record on their own for Capitol Records.

Subsequent reissues were on the Columbia imprint, and on March 31, 2009, a remastered digipak version of Before the Flood was issued by Legacy Recordings/Columbia, now part of Sony Music Entertainment.

== Critical reception ==
Professional ratings
Review scores
Source	Rating
AllMusic	4.5/5 stars
Chicago Tribune	4/4 stars
Christgau's Record Guide	A
Creem	A+
Encyclopedia of Popular Music	3/5 stars
MusicHound Rock	2/5
PopMatters	5/10
The Rolling Stone Album Guide	3.5/5 stars
Sputnikmusic	4.5/5
Tom Hull	A−

In a contemporary review for Creem magazine, Robert Christgau felt that the Band followed Dylan in intensifying his old songs for the arena venue and stated, "Without qualification, this is the craziest and strongest rock and roll ever recorded. All analogous live albums fall flat." In a less enthusiastic review, Rolling Stone magazine's Tom Nolan said Dylan's vocal emphasis and the Band's busy arrangements make for an awkward listen, although revamped versions of songs such as "It's All Right, Ma", "Like a Rolling Stone", and "All Along the Watchtower" are successful and sound meaningful. Before the Flood was voted the sixth best album of 1974, in The Village Voice's annual Pazz & Jop critics poll. Christgau, the poll's creator, ranked it second on his own list.

In a retrospective review, Greg Kot of the Chicago Tribune called the album "epochal", while AllMusic's Stephen Thomas Erlewine described it as "one of the best live albums of its time. Ever, maybe." Greil Marcus commented, "Roaring with resentment and happiness, the music touched rock and roll at its limits." By contrast, Dylan himself later disparaged the tour, feeling that it was overblown. "I think I was just playing a role on that tour, I was playing Bob Dylan and the Band were playing the Band. It was all sort of mindless. The only thing people talked about was energy this, energy that. The highest compliments were things like, 'Wow, lotta energy, man.' It had become absurd." In a retrospective review, Scott Hreha from PopMatters also felt that each act did not sound collaborative as on The Basement Tapes and that the album "remains a worthy but inessential item in Dylan's catalog—and both he and the Band have better live recordings available, especially the several volumes in Dylan's Bootleg Series."

== Track listing ==
All tracks are written by Bob Dylan except where noted; all dates from Los Angeles except where noted. Sides one and four are performances by Bob Dylan backed by the Band; side two and tracks four through six on side three are by the Band; tracks one through three on side three by Dylan alone. "Blowin' in the Wind" is a splice of two separate performances.

Side one
No.	Title	Recording date	Length
1.	"Most Likely You Go Your Way and I'll Go Mine"	02-14 (evening)	4:15
2.	"Lay Lady Lay"	02-13	3:14
3.	"Rainy Day Women #12 & 35"	02-13	3:27
4.	"Knockin' on Heaven's Door"	01-30 New York City	3:51
5.	"It Ain't Me Babe"	02-14 (evening)	3:40
6.	"Ballad of a Thin Man"	02-14 (afternoon)	3:41
Total length:			22:08

Side two
No.	Title	Recording date	Length
1.	"Up on Cripple Creek" (Robbie Robertson)	02-14 (evening)	5:25
2.	"I Shall Be Released"	02-14 (afternoon)	3:50
3.	"Endless Highway" (Robertson)	02-14 (evening)	5:10
4.	"The Night They Drove Old Dixie Down" (Robertson)	02-14 (evening)	4:24
5.	"Stage Fright" (Robertson)	02-14 (evening)	4:45
Total length:			23:34

Side three
No.	Title	Recording date	Length
1.	"Don't Think Twice, It's All Right"	02-14 (evening)	4:36
2.	"Just Like a Woman"	02-14 (evening)	5:06
3.	"It's Alright, Ma (I'm Only Bleeding)"	02-14 (evening)	5:48
4.	"The Shape I'm In" (Robertson)	02-14 (afternoon)	4:01
5.	"When You Awake" (Richard Manuel, Robertson)	02-14 (evening)	3:13
6.	"The Weight" (Robertson)	02-13	4:47
Total length:			27:31

Side four
No.	Title	Recording date	Length
1.	"All Along the Watchtower"	02-14 (afternoon)	3:07
2.	"Highway 61 Revisited"	02-14 (evening)	4:27
3.	"Like a Rolling Stone"	02-13	7:09
4.	"Blowin' in the Wind"	02-13 + 02-14 (afternoon)	4:30
Total length:			19:13

== Personnel ==
=== Musicians ===
- Bob Dylan – vocals, guitars, harmonica, piano
- Robbie Robertson – electric guitar, backing vocals
- Garth Hudson – organ, piano, clavinet
- Levon Helm – vocals, drums
- Richard Manuel – vocals, piano, electric piano, organ, drums
- Rick Danko – vocals, bass guitar

=== Production ===
- Rob Fraboni – recording engineer, mixing engineer
- Phil Ramone – recording engineer
- Nat Jeffrey – mixing engineer
- Barry Feinstein – photography, design
- Village Recorders – mixing location
- Kendun Recorders – mastering location
- Jeff Rosen – reissue producer
- Steve Berkowitz – reissue producer
- Location recording by Wally Heider Recording,
- Recording crew: Ed Barton, Bill Broms, Jack Crymes, Biff Dawes and Deane Jensen

== Charts ==
Chart performance for Before the Flood
Chart (1974)	Peak position
Austrian Albums (Ö3 Austria)	3
Dutch Albums (Album Top 100)	7
German Albums (Offizielle Top 100)	24
Norwegian Albums (VG-lista)	6
UK Albums (Official Charts)	33
US Billboard 200	3

== Certifications ==
Region	Certification	Certified units/sales
United Kingdom (BPI)	Gold	100,000^{‡}
United States (RIAA)	Platinum	1,000,000^{^}
^{^} Shipments figures based on certification alone.^{‡} Sales+streaming figures based on certification alone.
