= Woodstock Playhouse =

American summer stock theater

Coordinates: 42.038485°N 74.111190°W

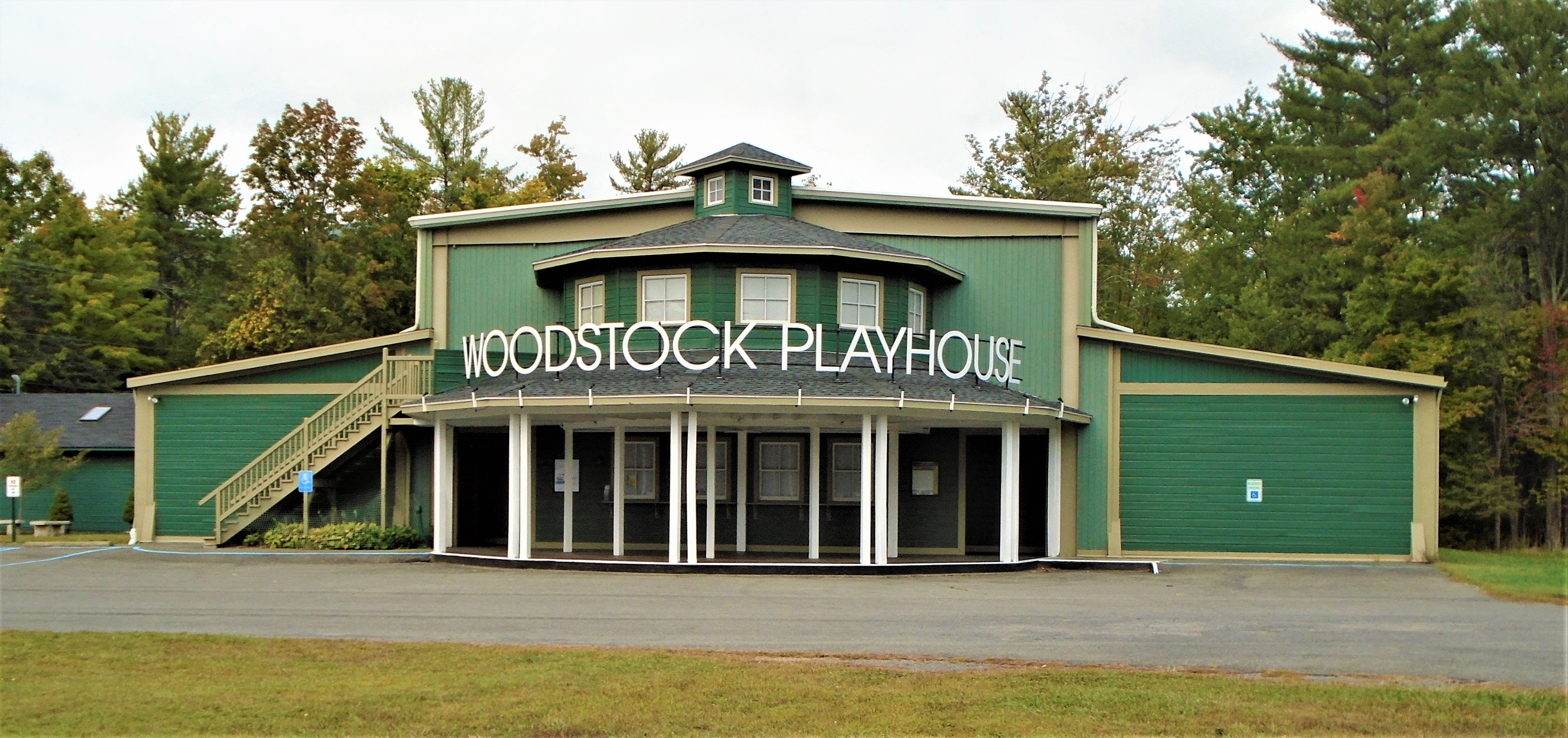
- (2020)
- Interactive map of Woodstock Playhouse
- Address: 103 Mill Hill Road; United States
- Location: Woodstock, New York
- Owner: Pan American Dance Foundation
- Type: Theatre

The Woodstock Playhouse is an American summer stock theater located at 103 Mill Hill Road in Woodstock, New York. Founded in 1938, the not-for profit theater hosts theatre, music and other presentations throughout the year. The original building burned in 1988, with the current building having opened in June 2011.
