= Stage Fright (album) =

Studio album by the Band
- Released: August 17, 1970
- Recorded: May–June 1970
- Studio: Woodstock Playhouse (Woodstock, New York)
- Genre: Roots rock
- Length: 35:41
- Label: Capitol
- Producer: The Band

The Band chronology
| The Band (1969) | Stage Fright (1970) | Cahoots (1971) |

Singles from Stage Fright
- 1. "Time to Kill" Released: October 1970

Stage Fright is the third studio album by the Canadian-American rock band the Band, released on August 17, 1970, by Capitol Records. It featured two of the group's best known songs, "The Shape I'm In" and "Stage Fright", both of which showcased praised lead vocal performances (by Richard Manuel and Rick Danko, respectively) and became staples in the group's live shows.

Stage Fright was a contradictory record, combining buoyant music and disenchanted lyrics, and exploring themes such as peace, escape and frivolity that revealed darker shades of melancholy, anxiety and fatigue. Writer Ross Johnson described it as "a cheerful-sounding record that unintentionally was confessional... a spirited romp through a dispirited period in the group's history." As a result, it received a somewhat mixed reception compared to its widely praised predecessors, largely due to the ways that it departed from those records. Generally, critics agreed that the music was solid. They hailed aspects like Garth Hudson's diverse textural weavings, Robbie Robertson's incisive guitar work, and the funk of the Danko–Levon Helm rhythm section, but differed on the record's troubling tone and overall cohesiveness. In later years, on the occasion of reissue and remaster releases, many critics reappraised the album as showing "no drop-off in quality compared to the first two" and "evidence of a group still working at the top of their form."

Much more of a rock album than the country and folk influences on group's previous efforts, Stage Fright had a more downcast, contemporary focus and less of the vocal harmony blend that had been a centerpiece of the first two albums. The tradition of switching instruments continued, however, with each musician contributing parts on at least two different instruments. The album included two of the last songs composed by pianist Richard Manuel, both co-written with Robertson, who would continue to be the group's dominant songwriter until the group ceased touring in 1976.

Stage Fright peaked at number 5 on the Billboard albums chart, surpassing the group's first two albums, which reached numbers 30 and 9, respectively. It was one of three albums by the group, including The Band and Rock of Ages, to be certified gold (more than 500,000 sales).

== Production ==
Stage Fright was engineered by an up-and-coming Todd Rundgren and produced by the group themselves for the first time, though their previous producer, John Simon, features as trombonist for one track. Its cover featured a semi-abstract sunset designed by Bob Cato wrapped in a poster of a photograph by Norman Seeff, in his first major gig.

Initially, Robertson says that he intended to do a less serious "goof" or "good-time" record in contrast to The Band. The group's plan was to record the album live in their home base of Woodstock, New York at the Woodstock Playhouse. Ultimately, the town council feared a Woodstock Music and Art Fair-type stampede and vetoed the idea, leading the group to simply use the off-season theater as a makeshift studio. Upbeat, straightforward rockers like "Strawberry Wine", "Time to Kill" and "Just Another Whistle Stop", the funkier "The W.S. Walcott Medicine Show", and Robertson's more prominent guitar work together suggest the record retained some of the early, good-time intention. However, Robertson gradually found the songs taking a darker turn: "this album Stage Fright started seeping through the floor. I found myself writing songs that I couldn't help but write." "The Shape I'm In" and "Stage Fright" grappled with dissipation and panic, while "The Rumor" and "Daniel and the Sacred Harp" addressed the malevolence of gossip and the loss of one's soul in pursuit of fame and fortune. Manuel's dreamy "Sleeping" walked an uncomfortable line between bliss and a too-close-to-home longing for final escape. Standing alone as a purely positive song was Robertson's delicate lullaby, "All La Glory", written for the birth of his daughter, buoyed by one of Helm's most gentle, emotive vocals. Even there, though, Robertson uses lonesome imagery, referring to feeling "so tall like a prison wall".

In a 2010 interview, Robertson described the recording atmosphere as tense, with the group contending with a tricky sound situation in the playhouse, an unfamiliar presence in Rundgren, and "distraction and a lot of drug experimenting." In This Wheel's on Fire, Helm concurred, describing a "dark mood that settled upon us" during the sessions. Helm also believed the record could have benefited from more time, saying, "for the first time we hadn't cut it to our standard... The days when we would live with the music were over."

Two different mixes were prepared in London, England, one by Rundgren at Trident Studios and another by Glyn Johns at Island Studios. Some reports have suggested that Johns's mix was selected for the original LP release and nearly all subsequent reissues on Capitol (including the expanded 2000 remaster), while Rundgren's Trident mix was eventually used on Capitol's first CD release and a 24k gold CD reissue by the DCC Compact Classics label in 1994. However, there is considerable disagreement about this. In an interview with Relix magazine, Rundgren said he had to engineer a third set of mixes with the band in New York after some members expressed dissatisfaction with his Trident mixes and Johns's Island mixes. However, Rundgren conceded that he had no idea which mixes were finally used for any of the album's releases. In his memoir, Sound Man, Johns seems to confirm Rundgren's memory, noting that each did their own set of mixes independently, without the band present, and that he never really knew whose mixes were used or in what quantity either. Further confusion has been caused by inaccurate documentation that mistakenly lists Johns as the engineer for both mixes with no indication of Rundgren doing any work at either studio. Both Rundgren and Trident engineer Ken Scott have independently stated that Rundgren mixed the album at Trident, and Johns himself has confirmed Rundgren's presence in London mixing at a different studio than his.

When Robertson produced a new reissue for the album's 50th anniversary, he supervised a brand new mix with Bob Clearmountain, just as he had done with previous deluxe sets commemorating the 50th anniversaries of Music from Big Pink and The Band. While the previous anniversary mixes were intended as experiments with new formats such as 5.1 surround sound and high-resolution digital playback, the new mix for Stage Fright addressed Robertson's own dissatisfaction with the original LP mix, just as the 2013 reissue of the 1971 Academy shows addressed his dissatisfaction with the original mix of the Rock of Ages live album. Furthermore, Robertson resequenced Stage Fright, claiming that the original LP sequence had been compromised by internal politics.

== Reception ==
Professional ratings
Review scores
| Source | Rating |
|---|---|
| AllMusic | 4.5/5 stars |
| Christgau's Record Guide | B+ |
| DownBeat | 3/5 stars |
| Entertainment Weekly | A− |
| MusicHound Rock | 4/5 stars |
| Pitchfork | 8.3/10 |
| Q | 4/5 stars |
| Rolling Stone | 3.5/5 stars |
| The Rolling Stone Album Guide | 4/5 stars |
| Uncut | 8/10 |

Upon its release, critics generally praised Stage Fright's music. But several identified differences from the first two albums—themes of anxiety and vulnerability, fewer Americana character sketches, less of a communal feel—and suggested that something elusive was missing. Rolling Stone critic John Burks cited the group's "precision teamwork", but felt the lyrics did not quite connect with the music and vocals; he wrote that the album was lacking "glory." Critic Robert Christgau thought that the "bright and doughty" tunes overmatched the words. He concluded, "Memorable as most of these songs are, they never hook in—never give up the musical-verbal phrase that might encapsulate their every-which-way power." Billboard's Ed Ochs described it as "candid and confessional, genuinely comic and gently satiric," but noted a "relationship of music to message [that] is noticeably off."

According to author Neil Minturn, Greil Marcus's take in Mystery Train (1975) became pivotal and permeated subsequent assessments. Marcus called it "an album of doubt, guilt, disenchantment and false optimism. The past no longer served them—the songs seemed trapped in the present, a jumble of desperation that was at once personal and social. The music was still special, but in every sense, the kind of unity that had given force... was missing. Now instead of hearing music that could not be really be broken down, one picked at parts for satisfaction."

Later reviewers, however, questioned whether some mid-1970s criticism was colored by a perceived decline in the group's output, post-Stage Fright. In Q, rock critic John Bauldie hailed the trademark vocal interplay on "The Rumor" and "Daniel and the Sacred Harp", the ballads "All La Glory" and "Sleeping", and "The Shape I'm In" as career highlights. He suggested Stage Fright "may well be the greatest of their records." AllMusic critic William Ruhlmann applauded the album's dense arrangements and instrumental work, and noting its "nakedly confessional" quality, wrote, "It was certainly different from their previous work... but it was hardly less compelling for that." Writer Paul Casey described Stage Fright as "heartfelt," "sublime," and the "most personal, and least enamored with the fictional history aesthetic" of the band's albums. He concluded that it was "in some important ways above the two previous records," and that while "a commentary on the problems that were beginning to become apparent, [...] it is not compromised."

== Track listing ==
All tracks are written by Robbie Robertson, except where indicated.

Side one
| No. | Title | Writer(s) | Lead vocals | Length |
|---|---|---|---|---|
| 1. | "Strawberry Wine" | Levon Helm, Robbie Robertson | Helm | 2:34 |
| 2. | "Sleeping" | Richard Manuel, Robertson | Manuel | 3:10 |
| 3. | "Time to Kill" | | Rick Danko, Manuel | 3:24 |
| 4. | "Just Another Whistle Stop" | Manuel, Robertson | Manuel | 3:48 |
| 5. | "All La Glory" | | Helm | 3:31 |

Side two
| No. | Title | Lead vocals | Length |
|---|---|---|---|
| 1. | "The Shape I'm In" | Manuel | 3:58 |
| 2. | "The W.S. Walcott Medicine Show" | Helm, Danko | 2:58 |
| 3. | "Daniel and the Sacred Harp" | Helm, Manuel | 4:06 |
| 4. | "Stage Fright" | Danko | 3:40 |
| 5. | "The Rumor" | Danko, Helm, Manuel | 4:13 |

2000 reissue bonus tracks
| No. | Title | Length |
|---|---|---|
| 11. | "Daniel and the Sacred Harp" (Alternate Take) | 5:01 |
| 12. | "Time to Kill" (Alternate Mix) | 3:26 |
| 13. | "The W.S. Walcott Medicine Show" (Alternate Mix) | 3:05 |
| 14. | "Radio Commercial" | 1:05 |

=== 2021 50th Anniversary Deluxe Edition ===
Disc one - Original album 2020 remix
| No. | Title | Length |
|---|---|---|
| 1. | "The W.S. Walcott Medicine Show" | 3:11 |
| 2. | "The Shape I'm In" | 4:01 |
| 3. | "Daniel And The Sacred Harp" | 4:12 |
| 4. | "Stage Fright" | 3:43 |
| 5. | "The Rumor" | 4:14 |
| 6. | "Time To Kill" | 3:25 |
| 7. | "Just Another Whistle Stop" | 4:26 |
| 8. | "All La Glory" | 3:34 |
| 9. | "Strawberry Wine" | 2:34 |
| 10. | "Sleeping" | 3:19 |

Disc one - Bonus Tracks
| No. | Title | Length |
|---|---|---|
| 11. | "Strawberry Wine" (Alternate Mix) | 2:33 |
| 12. | "Sleeping" (Alternate Mix) | 3:25 |

Disc one - Calgary Hotel Room Recordings
| No. | Title | Length |
|---|---|---|
| 13. | "Get Up Jake" (#1) | 1:47 |
| 14. | "Get Up Jake" (#2) | 2:34 |
| 15. | "The W.S. Walcott Medicine Show" | 1:14 |
| 16. | "Rockin' Pneumonia And The Boogie Woogie Flu" | 3:11 |
| 17. | "Calgary Blues" | 3:01 |
| 18. | "Before You Accuse Me" | 2:11 |
| 19. | "Mojo Hannah" | 3:59 |

Disc two - Live At the Royal Albert Hall
| No. | Title | Length |
|---|---|---|
| 1. | "The Shape I'm In" | 4:00 |
| 2. | "Time To Kill" | 3:30 |
| 3. | "The Weight" | 4:49 |
| 4. | "King Harvest (Has Surely Come)" | 3:48 |
| 5. | "Strawberry Wine" | 3:40 |
| 6. | "Rockin' Chair" | 4:11 |
| 7. | "Look Out Cleveland" | 3:30 |
| 8. | "I Shall Be Released" | 3:38 |
| 9. | "Stage Fright" | 3:46 |
| 10. | "Up On Cripple Creek" | 4:38 |
| 11. | "The W.S. Walcott Medicine Show" | 3:39 |
| 12. | "We Can Talk" | 3:05 |
| 13. | "Loving You Is Sweeter Than Ever" | 3:24 |
| 14. | "The Night They Drove Old Dixie Down" | 4:12 |
| 15. | "Across the Great Divide" | 3:21 |
| 16. | "The Unfaithful Servant" | 4:16 |
| 17. | "Don't Do It" | 4:41 |
| 18. | "The Genetic Method" | 4:16 |
| 19. | "Chest Fever" | 5:10 |
| 20. | "Rag Mama Rag" | 4:01 |

== Personnel ==
The Band

- Rick Danko – bass guitar, fiddle, double bass, vocals
- Levon Helm – drums, guitar, percussion, vocals
- Garth Hudson – organ, electric piano, accordion, tenor and baritone saxophones
- Richard Manuel – piano, organ, drums, clavinet, vocals
- Robbie Robertson – guitars, autoharp

Additional personnel

- Todd Rundgren – mixing and recording engineer
- Glyn Johns – mixing engineer
- John Simon – trombone on "The W.S. Walcott Medicine Show"

== Charts ==
=== Album ===
Chart performance for Stage Fright
| Chart (1970) | Peak position |
|---|---|
| Australian Albums (Kent Music Report) | 2 |
| Canada Top Albums/CDs (RPM) | 6 |
| Dutch Albums (Album Top 100) | 5 |
| Norwegian Albums (VG-lista) | 9 |
| UK Albums (Official Charts) | 15 |
| US Billboard 200 | 5 |

| Chart (2021) | Peak position |
|---|---|
| Belgian Albums (Ultratop Flanders) | 180 |
| German Albums (Offizielle Top 100) | 83 |
| Scottish Albums (Official Charts) | 9 |
| Swedish Physical Albums (Sverigetopplistan) | 19 |

=== Singles ===
| Year | Single | Chart | Position |
|---|---|---|---|
| 1970 | "Time to Kill" | US Pop Singles (Billboard) | 77 |
