= David Yaffe (music critic) =

American academic (1973 - 2024)

David Yaffe (January 1, 1973 - November 16, 2024) was an American academic who grew up in Dallas, Texas, where he attended the Booker T. Washington High School for the Performing and Visual Arts. He received his BA from Sarah Lawrence, and he began writing for The Village Voice while he was a student there. He received his Ph.D. in English from the Graduate Center, CUNY. He was a professor of humanities at Syracuse University — where he began teaching in 2005 – and is known for his critical writings on music. During the 2008–2009 academic year, he was the Gould Faculty Fellow in the Humanities at Claremont McKenna College. He subsequently returned to Syracuse. He taught in the English department from 2005 to 2013, then received tenure from the university, and was an unaffiliated professor of humanities until his death. He served as the Dean's Fellow in the Humanities from 2013 to 2015. His writings appeared in many publications, including the New York Review of Books, The Paris Review, Bookforum, Harper's Magazine, The Nation, Slate, The New York Times, New York Magazine, The Village Voice, The Daily Beast, and The Chronicle of Higher Education. Beginning in 2021, he contributed regularly to Air Mail.

Along with Ruth Franklin, he was awarded the 2012 Roger Shattuck Prize for Criticism, presented by the Center for Fiction.

His third book, Reckless Daughter: A Portrait of Joni Mitchell (FSG, 2017), was the winner of the ASCAP/Deems Taylor/Virgil Thomson Award and the Association for Recorded Sound Collections Award for Excellence in Historical Recorded Sound Research, and a Washington Post Notable Book of the year, 2017. It has been translated into Chinese, Korean, Japanese, Danish, and German. It has been optioned for a scripted series with Sony Entertainment.

Among other media appearances, including PBS NewsHour, in December 2018 Yaffe appeared on an episode of BBC Radio 4's Soul Music, discussing the Joni Mitchell song "River".

== Death ==
On October 6, 2024, Professor Yaffe was shocked and saddened by the death of his only son, fifteen-year-old Julian. On November 14, 2024, Professor Yaffe was admitted to a New York hospital with abdominal pain. After being treated and released, he returned to his apartment, where he was later found dead.

== Works ==
- Fascinating Rhythm: Reading Jazz in American Writing, Princeton University Press, 2006. ISBN 0691123578
- Bob Dylan: Like a Complete Unknown, Yale University Press, May 24, 2011. ISBN 978-0-300-12457-6
- Reckless Daughter: A Portrait of Joni Mitchell, Farrar, Straus and Giroux, 2017. ISBN 9780374248130
