= John Bauldie =

British journalist (1949–1996)

John Bauldie (23 August 1949 – 22 October 1996) was a British journalist. He was regarded as an authority on the work of Bob Dylan. He was editor of the Dylan fanzine The Telegraph, and was also on the launch staff of Q magazine. He died in a helicopter crash with the businessman Matthew Harding, having watched his favourite football team, Bolton Wanderers, defeat Chelsea. The crash enquiry found that the pilot was not qualified to fly on instruments in the fog of the crash night.
