= Moondog Matinee =

- Outer poster cover

Studio album by the Band
- Released: October 15, 1973
- Recorded: March–June 1973
- Studios: Bearsville (Woodstock, New York); Capitol (Hollywood)
- Genre: Rock
- Length: 35:09
- Label: Capitol
- Producer: The Band

The Band chronology
Rock of Ages (1972)	Moondog Matinee (1973)	Planet Waves (1974)

Interior cover

Australian alternate cover

Professional ratings
Review scores
Source	Rating
AllMusic	2/5 stars
Christgau's Record Guide	B+
DownBeat	3/5 stars
Entertainment Weekly	B+
MusicHound	5/5
The Rolling Stone Album Guide	3/5 stars
Q Magazine	4/5 stars

Moondog Matinee is the fifth studio album by Canadian/American rock group the Band, released in 1973. It consists entirely of cover material reflecting the group's love of R&B and blues music, with one exception in their interpretation of the theme from the film The Third Man.

In a 2002 interview, Levon Helm described the reasoning for recording an album of covers: "That was all we could do at the time. We couldn't get along—we all knew that fairness was a bunch of shit. We all knew we were getting screwed, so we couldn't sit down and create no more music. 'Up on Cripple Creek' and all that stuff was over—all that collaboration was over, and that type of song was all we could do." At the same time, Helm argued that people could not accurately evaluate the Band or anyone else as performers when they were performing original material. "When they're doing their own stuff, you can't tell how good they are or how good they ain't. You let both of us do a Chuck Berry tune, then you can tell how good the bands are..." Helm made a similar defense for Moondog Matinee earlier in his memoir, adding that "there was very little collaboration among us after Stage Fright in terms of creating new songs, but we still worked hard when we had to." He would praise Richard Manuel for his work despite his personal difficulties, stating that "once he got started, man: drums, piano, play it all, sing, do the lead in one of them high, hard-assed keys to sing in. Richard just knew how a song was supposed to go. Structure, melody; he understood it."

The original idea had been to replicate the group's setlists of the mid-'60s when they had been known as Levon and the Hawks, playing clubs throughout Canada and the US. Of the ten tracks, only one, "Share Your Love (With Me)" had been performed by the group in the mid-'60s. The rest were merely tracks the group admired, two of them, "Holy Cow" and "A Change Is Gonna Come", chronologically coming after the group's club days.

Rhapsody praised the album, calling it one of its favorite cover albums. John Bauldie in Q Magazine called the re-issued album 'funny, affectionate and immaculately polished' in 1991.

== Track listing ==
=== Side one ===
No.	Title	Writer(s)	Lead vocals	Length
1.	"Ain't Got No Home"	Clarence "Frogman" Henry	Levon Helm	3:20
2.	"Holy Cow"	Allen Toussaint	Rick Danko, Helm	3:15
3.	"Share Your Love (With Me)"	Deadric Malone, Alfred Braggs	Richard Manuel	2:50
4.	"Mystery Train"	Junior Parker, Sam Phillips, Robbie Robertson (additional lyrics)	Helm	5:35
5.	"Third Man Theme"	Anton Karas	Instrumental	2:43

=== Side two ===
No.	Title	Writer(s)	Lead vocals	Length
1.	"Promised Land"	Chuck Berry	Helm	3:00
2.	"The Great Pretender"	Buck Ram	Manuel	3:07
3.	"I'm Ready"	Fats Domino, Al Lewis, Sylvester Bradford	Helm	3:22
4.	"Saved"	Jerry Leiber and Mike Stoller	Manuel	3:42
5.	"A Change Is Gonna Come"	Sam Cooke	Danko	4:15

- Sides one and two were combined as tracks 1–10 on CD reissues.

=== 2001 reissue bonus tracks ===
No.	Title	Writer(s)	Lead vocals	Length
11.	"Didn't It Rain" (Outtake)	Traditional, arr. by Roberta Martin	Helm	3:16
12.	"Crying Heart Blues" (Outtake)	Joe Brown	Danko	3:29
13.	"Shakin'" (Outtake)	Sam Cooke	Helm	3:31
14.	"What Am I Living For" (Outtake)	Fred Jay, Art Harris	Helm	5:04
15.	"Going Back to Memphis" (Outtake)	Berry	Helm	5:02
16.	"Endless Highway" (Studio version)	Robertson	Danko	5:09

== Personnel ==
The Band

- Rick Danko – bass guitar, acoustic guitar, vocals
- Levon Helm – drums, electric guitar, bass guitar, double bass, vocals
- Garth Hudson – organ, piano, clavinet, synthesizer, saxophones
- Richard Manuel – acoustic and electric piano, drums, vocals
- Robbie Robertson – electric and acoustic guitars

Additional personnel

- Billy Mundi – drums on "Ain't Got No Home" and "Promised Land"
- Ben Keith – steel guitar on "Promised Land"

Technical

- Mark Harman – engineer
- Jay Ranellucci – engineer
- John Wilson – engineer
- Edward Kasper – artwork
