= Stage Fright (The Band song) =

1970 song by The Band

Song by The Band

from the album Stage Fright
- Released: 1970
- Recorded: May–June 1970
- Studio: Woodstock Playhouse, Woodstock, New York
- Genre: Roots rock
- Length: 3:40
- Label: Capitol Records
- Songwriter: Robbie Robertson
- Producers: The Band, Todd Rundgren

"Stage Fright"

Single by The Band

from the album Before the Flood
- A-side: "Most Likely You Go Your Way (And I'll Go Mine)"; (Bob Dylan)
- Released: 1974
- Recorded: February 1974
- Genre: Roots rock
- Length: 4:22
- Label: Asylum Records
- Songwriter: Robbie Robertson

"Stage Fright" is the title track of the Band's third album, Stage Fright. It features Rick Danko on lead vocals and was written by Robbie Robertson. According to author Barney Hoskyns, Robertson originally intended it to be sung by Richard Manuel but it became clear that the song was better suited to Danko's "nervous, tremulous voice."

Live performances of the song appear on Rock of Ages, released in 1972, and on Before the Flood, a live album of The Band's 1974 tour with Bob Dylan. It was also performed at The Last Waltz. The live version from Before the Flood was released as the B-side of Dylan's "Most Likely You Go Your Way (And I'll Go Mine)" single in 1974.

According to AllMusic critic William Ruhlmann, the lyrics are about "the pitfalls of fortune and fame." Author Neil Minturn regards the subject of the lyrics to be "the history of The Band itself." The Band drummer Levon Helm has written that the song is about "the terror of performing." Others believe that the lyrics refer to Bob Dylan, who had stopped touring live during the late 1960s. Author David Yaffe suggests that "Stage Fright" could have been written about Dylan or about Robbie Robertson himself. Author Barney Hoskyns acknowledges speculation that the song is about Dylan, but states that it is actually about Robertson's experience of his own stage fright at the Band's first live show the prior year. Time Magazine praised the song's image of a plowboy, who in the opening of the song received "his fortune and fame" but "since that day he ain't been the same."

The song begins in the key of C major and that key is also prominent at the end. The keys of E minor and G major are also emphasized throughout the song. Since these keys are related to C major, they help reinforce the prominence of C major in the song. G major is also emphasized through the use of these keys and the related key of B minor. Tense lyrics about paying a price to be able to "sing like a bird" and a surprising shift to the unrelated key of F sharp major increase the tension of the bridge, which leads into Garth Hudson's organ solo. Minturn praises Hudson's sixteen bar solo for using rhythm, pace, rest and pitch to "work together to hold back, to balance or to tip forward at just the right time." Helm regarded the song as a "showpiece" for lead singer and bassist Rick Danko particularly in the use of a fretless bass, which according to Helm "gave the rhythm section a different feel."

Music critic Ralph J. Gleason considered "Stage Fright" to be "the best song ever written about performing." Music critic Paul Evans praised the "penetrating psychological acuity" of its writing. Rolling Stone critic Dave Marsh called it one of the most notably fine moments of the Stage Fright album. Critic Mark Kemp called it a "highlight" of the album, further noting that it reveals "a growing sense of anxiety and cynicism" by the band."

== Personnel ==
Credits are adapted from the liner notes of A Musical History.

- Robbie Robertson – electric guitar
- Garth Hudson – Lowrey organ
- Richard Manuel – piano, backing vocals
- Rick Danko – bass, lead vocals
- Levon Helm – drums
