= The Shape I'm In (The Band song) =

- Spanish cover

Single by the Band

from the album Stage Fright
- A-side: "Time to Kill"
- Released: October 1970
- Recorded: May to June 1970; Bearsville Studios; Woodstock, New York
- Genre: Roots rock
- Length: 3:24
- Label: Capitol
- Songwriter: Robbie Robertson
- Producer: The Band

"The Shape I'm In" is a song by the Canadian–American rock band the Band, first released on their 1970 album Stage Fright. It was written by Robbie Robertson, who did little to disguise the fact that the song's sense of dread and dissolution was about Richard Manuel, the song's principal singer. It became a regular feature in their concert repertoire, appearing on their live albums Rock of Ages, Before the Flood, and The Last Waltz. Author Neil Minturn described the song as "straightforward rock." Along with "The Weight", it is one of the Band's songs most performed by other artists. It has been recorded or performed by Bo Diddley, the Good Brothers, the Mekons, the Pointer Sisters, She & Him, Marty Stuart and Nathaniel Rateliff and the Night Sweats.

It was also released as the B-side to their single "Time to Kill", and proved more popular than the hit side, recognized by Capitol Records in its promotion kit for the single. The mix used for the single is disputed, as the Band had second thoughts about the work of the initial engineer Todd Rundgren, and sent the tapes to be remixed by British engineer Glyn Johns. Most likely, it was the Johns mixes used for both the album and the single.

The Band's drummer Levon Helm has written that the song is about "desperation". Author Barney Hoskyns describes it as "a first person account of winding up on Skid Row, positing the sanctuary of rural life against the aggravation of hustling on the street." Critic Greil Marcus thought the song "set the stage for the apocryphal political drama that is woven into the fabric of Stage Fright", although he didn't think the Band ever pulled off this drama satisfactorily.

Hoskyns describes the music as being "set to an insistent, crudely funky bass pulse". He describes Manuel's vocal as sounding appropriately "frantic". Minturn particularly praised Robbie Robertson's guitar playing and Garth Hudson's organ. Hoskyns points out that the end of Hudson's organ part quoted the vocal line from Bob Dylan's "I Pity the Poor Immigrant," noting that the quote may have been a coincidence, but also that it might be making a political point.

Rolling Stone critic Dave Marsh called "The Shape I'm In" one of the most notably fine moments of the Stage Fright album. Critic Mark Kemp called it a "highlight" of the album, further noting that it reveals "a growing sense of anxiety and cynicism" by the band. Music critic Paul Evans praised the "penetrating psychological acuity" of its writing. Record World called it "great."

== Personnel ==
Credits are adapted from the liner notes of A Musical History.

- Richard Manuel – lead vocals, clavinet
- Levon Helm – drums, backing vocals
- Rick Danko – bass guitar, backing vocals
- Robbie Robertson – electric guitar
- Garth Hudson – Lowrey organ

== Chart performance ==
Chart (1971)	Peak position
Canadian RPM Singles Chart	62
