= Robbie Robertson discography =

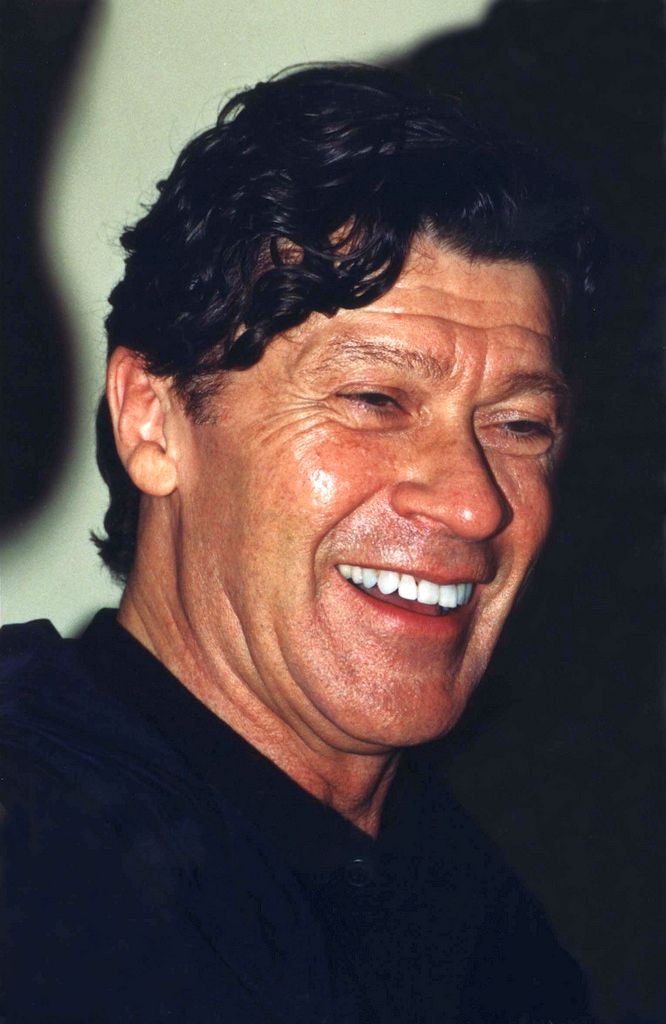
- Studio albums: 5
- Soundtrack albums: 2
- Compilation albums: 4
- Singles: 15
- Video albums: 2
- Music videos: 11

This is a comprehensive listing of official solo releases by Robbie Robertson, former lead guitarist and singer of The Band.

== Albums ==
=== Studio albums ===
Title	Details	Peak chart positions										Certifications
Title	Details	CAN	AUS	NOR	SCO	SWE	UK	US	US Rock	US Ind.	US Taste.	Certifications
Robbie Robertson	Released: October 27, 1987; Label: Geffen; Formats: LP, CD, cassette, digital download	12	—	5	—	13	23	38	—	—	—	MC: Gold; BPI: Gold; RIAA: Gold
Storyville	Released: September 30, 1991; Label: Geffen; Formats: LP, CD, cassette, digital download	9	113	9	—	20	30	69	—	—	—	
Contact from the Underworld of Redboy	Released: March 10, 1998; Label: Capitol/EMI; Formats: CD, cassette, digital download	46	189	16	—	45	79	119	—	—	—	
How to Become Clairvoyant	Released: April 5, 2011; Label: Macrobiotic/429; Formats: 3×LP+2×CD+DVD box set, 2×LP, 2×CD deluxe edition, CD, digital download	8	129	19	—	16	56	13	5	5	2	
Sinematic	Released: September 20, 2019; Label: Macrobiotic; Formats: 2×LP, CD, digital download	—	—	—	50	—	—	—	—	—	6	

=== Soundtrack albums ===
Title	Details	Peak chart positions	
Title	Details	AUS	SWE
Carny (Sound Track from the Motion Picture) (with Alex North)	Released: 1980; Label: Warner Bros.; Formats: LP, CD (2015)	—	—
Music for The Native Americans (with The Red Road Ensemble)	Released: October 4, 1994; Label: Capitol; Formats: CD, cassette, digital download	62	23

=== Compilation albums ===
Title	Details
Classic Masters	Released: 2002; Label: Capitol; Formats: CD, digital download
Robbie Robertson/Storyville (Expanded Edition)	Released: January 6, 2006; Label: Geffen/Hip-O Select; Formats: 2xCD, digital download
20th Century Masters – The Millennium Collection: The Best of Robbie Robertson	Released: 2006; Label: Universal Music; Formats: CD
Testimony (with The Band)	Released: 2016; Label: UMe; Formats: CD, digital download

== Singles ==
Year	Title	B-Side	Peak Billboard charts positions				AUS	CAN	UK	Album
Year	Title	B-Side	AAA	Alt.	Adult	Main.	AUS	CAN	UK	Album
1987	"Showdown at Big Sky"	"Hell's Half Acre"	—	—	—	2	95	48	—	Robbie Robertson
1987	"Sweet Fire of Love"		—	—	—	7	—	—	—	Robbie Robertson
1987	"Fallen Angel"	"Hell's Half Acre"	—	—	—	—	—	—	95	Robbie Robertson
1988	"American Roulette"		—	—	—	21	—	—	—	Robbie Robertson
1988	"Somewhere Down the Crazy River"	"Broken Arrow" / "American Roulette"	—	—	47	24	100	91	15	Robbie Robertson
1991	"What About Now"	"The Far Lonely Cry of Trains" (non-album track) / "Somewhere Down the Crazy River"	—	28	—	15	133	4	—	Storyville
1992	"Go Back to Your Woods"	"Broken Arrow" / "Sign of the Rainbow"	—	—	—	32	—	9	—	Storyville
1992	"Shake This Town"		—	—	—	—	—	26	—	
1994	"Bad Intentions"		—	—	—	—	—	39	—	Non-album single
1994	"Skinwalker"		—	—	—	—	—	49	—	Music for The Native Americans
1995	"Mahk Jchi (Heartbeat Drum Song)"	"It Is a Good Day to Die" / "Deneta" (non-album track)	—	—	—	—	—	93	—	Music for The Native Americans
1995	"Ghost Dance"	"Mahk Jchi (Dark Mountain Mix)"	—	—	—	—	—	71	—	Music for The Native Americans
1995	"The Vanishing Breed"	"Ghost Dance" / "Makh Jchi"	—	—	—	—	—	—	—	Music for The Native Americans
1998	"In the Blood"	"The Vanishing Breed" / "Ghost Dance"	—	—	—	—	—	—	—	Contact from the Underworld of Redboy
1998	"Unbound (Remix)"	"Unbound (Album Version)"	15	—	—	—	—	—	—	Contact from the Underworld of Redboy
2011	"He Don't Live Here No More"		—	—	—	—	—	—	—	How to Become Clairvoyant
2011	"Fear of Falling" (featuring Eric Clapton)		—	—	—	—	—	—	—	How to Become Clairvoyant
2019	"I Hear You Paint Houses" (featuring Van Morrison)		—	—	—	—	—	—	—	Sinematic
2019	"Let Love Reign"		—	—	—	—	—	—	—	Sinematic

=== Promotional singles ===
Year	Title	B-Side
1987	"Broken Arrow (Edit)"	"Broken Arrow"
1988	"Christmas Must Be Tonight"	
1992	"Shake This Town"	"Shake This Town (Edit)"
1992	"Breakin the Rules (Edit)"	"Breakin the Rules"
1996	"Crazy Love (Edit/Fade)" (with Aaron Neville)	"Crazy Love"

=== Guest singles ===
Year	Title	Artist
1997	"Take Your Partner by the Hand"	Howie B

== Other appearances ==
Miscellaneous appearances by Robbie Robertson
Year	Title	Album	Notes
1973	"Raised on Robbery"	Court and Spark	
1983	"Between Trains"	The King of Comedy	original songs
1986	"Modern Blues" and "Main Title"	The Color of Money	original songs
1988	"Christmas Must Be Tonight"	Scrooged	original songs
1994	"Slo Burn", "Let the Good Times Roll" (with Cassandra Wilson), and "Bad Intentions"	Jimmy Hollywood	soundtrack also features "The Lonely, Far Cry of Trains"
1996	"Crazy Love"	Phenomenon	Van Morrison cover
2000	"Amazing Grace", "Out of the Blue", and "Carry Me"	Any Given Sunday: Volume II	soundtrack also features "Ghost Dance (Saber Remix)"
2004	"Shine Your Light" and "Reflection-Adagio"	Ladder 49	original songs
2005	"Webster Hall", "A New Kind of Love", and "At Last"	Raging Bull	originally recorded in 1980
2019	"Theme for The Irishman"	The Irishman	

== Producer ==
=== Albums ===
Year	Artist	Title
1976	Neil Diamond	Beautiful Noise
1976	Neil Diamond	And the Singer Sings His Song
1977	Neil Diamond	Love at the Greek
2002	A.I.	Artificial Intelligence
2003	Eastmountainsouth	Eastmountainsouth

=== Soundtracks ===
Year	Title	Role	Label	Formats
1978	The Last Waltz (soundtrack)	Producer	Warner Bros.	3xLP, 2xcassette, 2xCD (1988), digital download
1983	The King of Comedy: Original Soundtrack	Producer	Warner Bros.	LP, cassette, CD (2016)
1986	The Color of Money: The Original Motion Picture Soundtrack	Producer	MCA	LP, CD, cassette, digital download
1994	Jimmy Hollywood: The Original Motion Picture Soundtrack	Producer	Atlas	CD, cassette
1995	Casino: Music from the Motion Picture	Producer	MCA	2xCD
1996	Phenomenon: Music from the Motion Picture	Executive producer	Reprise	CD, cassette, digital download
1999	Forces of Nature: Original Motion Picture Soundtrack	Executive producer	DreamWorks	CD, cassette, digital download
2000	Any Given Sunday: Music from the Motion Picture, Volume II	Producer	Warner Sunset/Atlantic	CD
2001	Shrek: Music from the Original Motion Picture	Executive producer	DreamWorks	CD, cassette, LP (2019), digital download
2002	The Last Waltz (soundtrack box set)	Producer	Warner Bros.	4xCD, DVD-A, digital download
2002	Gangs of New York: Music from the Miramax Motion Picture	Music supervisor	Interscope/Miramax	CD, digital download
2004	Ladder 49: Original Soundtrack	Producer	Hollywood	CD, digital download
2005	Raging Bull: The Original Motion Picture Soundtrack	Producer	Capitol	2xCD
2006	The Departed: Music from the Motion Picture	Music supervisor	Warner Sunset/Warner Bros.	CD, digital download
2010	Shutter Island: Music from the Motion Picture	Producer, music supervisor	Rhino	2xCD, digital download
2013	The Wolf of Wall Street: Music from the Motion Picture	Executive producer	Virgin	CD, digital download
2017	Silence: Original Motion Picture Soundtrack	Executive producer	Rhino Warner Classics	CD, digital download
2019	The Irishman (Original Motion Picture Soundtrack)	Executive producer	Netflix	LP, digital download
2023	Killers of the Flower Moon (Soundtrack from the Apple Original Film)	Producer	Sony Masterworks	CD, LP, digital download

== Music videos ==
Year	Title	Director
1987	"Showdown at Big Sky"	
1987	"Fallen Angel"	
1988	"Somewhere Down the Crazy River"	Martin Scorsese
1991	"What About Now"	
1992	"Go Back to Your Woods"	Samuel Bayer
1994	"Mahk Jchi"	Victor Ginzburg
1995	"Ghost Dance"	
1998	"Take Your Partner By the Hand"	
1998	"In the Blood"	
1998	"Unbound"	
2005	Sarah McLachlan - "World On Fire"	Paul Fedor

== See also ==
- The Band
- The Band discography
