= Broken Arrow (Robbie Robertson song) =

1987 song by Robbie Robertson

Song by Robbie Robertson

from the album Robbie Robertson
- Released: 1987
- Studio: Ashcombe House (Swainswick, Somerset)
- Length: 5:23
- Label: Geffen
- Songwriter: Robbie Robertson
- Producers: Daniel Lanois; Robbie Robertson

Audio
- "Broken Arrow" on YouTube

"Broken Arrow" is a song by Canadian musician Robbie Robertson, included on his debut solo studio album, Robbie Robertson (1987). Although it was not released as a single, it received airplay in Canada in mid-1988 and reached number 29 on the RPM Top Cancon Singles chart, which ranked songs of Canadian content only. The song was also included as the B-side on the UK formats of "Somewhere Down the Crazy River".

"Broken Arrow" was later popularized by English singer-songwriter Rod Stewart, who included a cover of the track on his 1991 album Vagabond Heart. Stewart's version was released as a single and became a hit in several countries, peaking at number two in Canada and number 20 in the United States. In 1992, this version was released again as a double A-side with Stewart's cover of Elton John's "Your Song" and charted in several additional countries.

Starting in 1993, the Grateful Dead began to incorporate the song into their live set lists at the suggestion of their bassist Phil Lesh.

== Background ==
After the conclusion of the album's recording sessions with members of U2 in Ireland, Robertson went to Peter Gabriel's studio in Bath, Somerset. After Gabriel had completed the backing vocals for "Fallen Angel", the two proceeded to work on "Broken Arrow", which at the time had been written but not recorded. The sessions in Bath included Robertson, Gabriel, Daniel Lanois and David Bottrill, who served as the session's audio engineer.

Gabriel assisted with the drum programming on a LinnDrum, which was responsible for the detuned tambourine sound. Some of the percussive tones also came from acoustic instruments, including one that Bottrill described as a "hairy drum" owned by Gabriel. A Delta Lab DL2 unit was used on some of Gabriel's instruments, which included a Prophet-5 and some piano. Additional instruments, including the drums, bass, and guitars, were recorded in Los Angeles. When discussing his audio production inclinations, Lanois commented that "Broken Arrow" was a song that was "presented with one angle, and then that is contrasted or undermined by something ominous, something that you feel more than you hear."

== Critical reception ==
Bill Flanagan of Musician magazine called "Broken Arrow" "a fragile mood piece full of longing and melancholy" and said that "it might be the most beautiful song he's ever written." Mark Prendergast referred to "Broken Arrow" as the album's "finest achievement and a contemporary songwriting masterpiece." He praised Robertson's vocal delivery as "perfect: husky, beseeching, and full of that lived-in feeling" and thought that Lanois's production work was kinetically true to the spirit of the piece".

Billboard ranked "Broken Arrow" ninth on its list ranking Robertson's best songs both as a member of the Band and as a solo artist, calling it "one of Robertson's most romantic songs". They also felt that the song sounded "atmospheric and dreamy" and "a little forbidden and clandestine, adding to its appeal." Rolling Stone included "Broken Arrow" on its list of Robertson' best songs in his recording career and said that it possessed "one of his most beautiful and sensual melodies."

== Personnel ==
- Robbie Robertson – lead and backing vocals, guitars
- Peter Gabriel – keyboards, drum programming
- Abraham Laboriel – bass
- Terry Bozzio – drums
- Daniel Lanois – percussion, backing vocals

== Charts ==
=== Weekly charts ===
| Chart (1988) | Peak position |
|---|---|
| Canada Top Cancon Singles (RPM) | 29 |

=== All-time charts ===
| Chart (1967–1992) | Position |
|---|---|
| Canada Cancon Hits (RPM) | 67 |

== Rod Stewart version ==
"Broken Arrow"

Single by Rod Stewart

from the album Vagabond Heart
- A-side: "Your Song" (1992)
- B-side: "I Was Only Joking", "The Killing of Georgie Pt 1 & 2" (1991); "Mandolin Wind", "The First Cut Is the Deepest" (1992)
- Released: August 26, 1991
- Studio: Cherokee, Conway (Hollywood, California); Sarm (London, England)
- Length: 4:26
- Label: Warner Bros.
- Songwriter: Robbie Robertson
- Producer: Patrick Leonard

Rod Stewart singles chronology
| "The Motown Song" (1991) | "Broken Arrow" (1991) | "Rebel Heart" (1991) |
| "People Get Ready" (1992) | "Your Song" / "Broken Arrow" (1992) | "Tom Traubert's Blues (Waltzing Matilda)" (1992) |

Music video
- "Broken Arrow" on YouTube

Rod Stewart covered "Broken Arrow" and included it as the third track on his 16th studio album, Vagabond Heart (1991). On August 26, 1991, it was released as the fourth single from the album by Warner Records. This version became a chart hit, rising to number two on Canada's RPM 100 Hit Tracks chart and number 20 on the US Billboard Hot 100, becoming Stewart's 21st top-20 hit on the latter chart. In the United Kingdom, the song originally reached number 54 on the UK singles chart, but in 1992, it was re-released as a double A-side single with Stewart's cover of "Your Song", originally by Elton John; this release peaked at number 41 on the same chart.

Reviewing Stewart's cover, Billboard characterized it as "a simple and affecting ballad", adding that "Stewart's signature rasp add[ed] a worldly dimension" to the song's lyrics.

=== Track listings ===
- UK 7-inch and cassette single (1991)
1. "Broken Arrow"
2. "I Was Only Joking"
- UK 10-inch and CD single (1991)
1. "Broken Arrow" (edit)
2. "The Killing of Georgie Pt 1 & 2"
3. "I Was Only Joking"
- UK 7-inch and cassette single (1992)
1. "Your Song"
2. "Broken Arrow"
- UK 12-inch and CD single (1992)
1. "Your Song"
2. "Broken Arrow"
3. "Mandolin Wind"
4. "The First Cut Is the Deepest"

=== Credits and personnel ===
Credits are lifted from the Vagabond Heart album booklet.

Studios

- Recorded at Cherokee Studio, Conway Studio (Hollywood, California), and Sarm Studio (London, England)
- Mastered at Precision Mastering (Los Angeles)

Personnel

- Robbie Robertson – writing
- Twinkle Schascle – backing vocals
- Tim Pierce – guitars
- Jimmy Johnson – bass
- Patrick Leonard – keyboards, production
- Jim Keltner – drums
- Luis Conte – percussion
- Lenny Waronker – co-production
- Jerry Jordan – mixing, engineering
- Marc Moreau – engineering assistance
- Stephen Marcussen – mastering

=== Charts ===
==== Weekly charts ====
"Broken Arrow"

| Chart (1991–1992) | Peak position |
|---|---|
| Australia (ARIA) | 63 |
| Canada Top Singles (RPM) | 2 |
| Canada Adult Contemporary (RPM) | 2 |
| Europe (European Hit Radio) | 25 |
| Germany (GfK) | 71 |
| Ireland (IRMA) | 21 |
| New Zealand (Recorded Music NZ) | 26 |
| UK Singles (Official Charts) | 54 |
| UK Airplay (Music Week) | 15 |
| US Billboard Hot 100 | 20 |
| US Adult Contemporary (Billboard) | 3 |
| US Cash Box Top 100 | 9 |

"Your Song" / "Broken Arrow"

| Chart (1992) | Peak position |
|---|---|
| France (SNEP) | 38 |
| Netherlands (Single Top 100) | 60 |
| UK Singles (Official Charts) | 41 |

==== Year-end charts ====
| Chart (1991) | Position |
|---|---|
| Canada Top Singles (RPM) | 48 |
| Canada Adult Contemporary (RPM) | 66 |

| Chart (1992) | Position |
|---|---|
| Canada Adult Contemporary (RPM) | 57 |
| US Adult Contemporary (Billboard) | 27 |

=== Release history ===
| Region | Version | Date | Format(s) | Label(s) | Ref. |
|---|---|---|---|---|---|
| United Kingdom | "Broken Arrow" | August 26, 1991 | 7-inch vinyl; 10-inch vinyl; CD; cassette | Warner Bros. | |
| Australia | "Broken Arrow" | October 7, 1991 | CD; cassette | Warner Bros. | |
| United Kingdom | "Your Song" / "Broken Arrow" | April 6, 1992 | 7-inch vinyl; 12-inch vinyl; CD; cassette | Warner Bros. | |
| Japan | "Your Song" / "Broken Arrow" | June 25, 1992 | Mini-CD | Warner Bros. | |
