= What About Now (Robbie Robertson song) =

Single by Robbie Robertson

from the album Storyville
- B-side: "The Far Lonely Cry of Trains"
- Released: October 14, 1991
- Genre: Rock
- Length: 5:10
- Label: Geffen
- Songwriters: Robbie Robertson; Ivan Neville
- Producers: Gary Gersh; Stephen Hague; Robbie Robertson

Robbie Robertson singles chronology
"Somewhere Down the Crazy River" (1988)	"What About Now" (1991)	"Go Back to Your Woods" (1992)

"What About Now" is a song by the Canadian singer-songwriter Robbie Robertson. Initially written during the sessions for Robertson's 1987 self-titled debut solo album, "What About Now" was ultimately included on Robertson's second solo album Storyville in 1991. The song was co-written by Ivan Neville and Robertson, the latter of whom also sang lead vocals on the track. It was originally written during It was issued by Geffen Records as the album's first single and became Robertson's highest charting song in his native country of Canada, where it peaked at No. 4.

== Background ==
"What About Now" was worked on at Bearsville Studios in Woodstock, New York during the development of Roberson's first solo album, released in 1987. In a September 1987 article published in Musician magazine, Bill Flanagan characterized the song as "a march with a fine rhythm, nice synth parts and a solid verse". He felt that the chorus was "a little too rousing for this LP, a little too jolly", which he attributed to the backing vocals, which had been recorded in Los Angeles. Robertson expressed interest in replacing these vocals with new parts from Maria McKee of the band Lone Justice "What About Now" was ultimately included on Robertson's second solo album Storyville, where the backing vocals were instead handled by Ivan Neville and Aaron Neville.

== Release ==
"What About Now" was serviced to US album oriented rock radio stations in September 1991. The song received 67 adds to album oriented rock radio stations reporting to Radio & Records during the last week of September, making it the second most-added song in that format. By the week of October 12, 1991, "What About Now" had been included on 62% of all album oriented rock stations reporting to Radio & Records. The following week, "What About Now" was added to adult contemporary radio stations. The song peaked at No. 15 on the US Billboard Album Rock Tracks chart in November, where it spent a total of ten weeks on the listing.

During the week of October 12, 1991, "What About Now" entered the Canadian RPM Top 100 singles chart at No. 28, making it the highest debut of the week. In his weekly column for RPM, Tim Evans said that "What About Now" was the highest debut on the RPM Top 100 singles chart since 1985, when "We Are the World" entered at No. 1. By December of that year, the song had reached its peak position of No. 4. Elsewhere, the song also received between 60-70 plays in Germany by the middle of October according to Music & Media.

A music video for "What About Now" was added to VH1 and MTV in October 1991. Reviewing the music video in their column for Billboard, Melinda Newman wrote that it was "tough to make videos as evocative as Robertson's music, but this one comes damn close." Robertson also performed the song during Guitar Legends, Seville 1991 with backing vocals from Bruce Hornsby and Aaron Neville.

== Critical reception ==
Music & Media wrote that the song was "another grower, reflecting the mystical atmosphere of New Orleans". The Gavin Report referred to it as a "generic call for action and attention to today's issues." Cashbox thought that the song had a "surprisingly Henley-istic approach". Billboard said that the "soulful, subdued, and introspective tune is lyrically powerful and instrumentally spare". They also highlighted the track's guitar playing, saying that it "provides the perfect, mystical complement to his melancholy vocals." Rolling Stone said that the song was "nicely embellished by the delicate ringing of Robertson's guitar"

== Personnel ==
- Robbie Robertson – acoustic and electric guitars, lead vocals
- Bill Dillon – guitar
- Guy Pratt – bass guitar
- Ivan Neville – keyboards, backing vocals
- Jerry Marotta – drums
- Alex Acuña – percussion
- Leon "Ndugu" Chancler – snare drum
- Aaron Neville – backing vocals

== Chart performance ==
=== Weekly charts ===
Chart (1991–1992)	Peak position
Australia (ARIA)	133
Canada Top Singles (RPM)	4
Canada Adult Contemporary (RPM)	7
US Alternative Airplay (Billboard)	28
US Mainstream Rock (Billboard)	15

=== Year-end charts ===
Chart (1991)	Position
Canada Top Singles (RPM)	30
Canada Adult Contemporary (RPM)	69

Chart (1992)	Position
Canada Adult Contemporary (RPM)	87
