= Sweet Fire of Love =

1987 song by Robbie Robertson

Song by Robbie Robertson

from the album Robbie Robertson
- Released: 1987
- Recorded: 1987
- Studio: U2 Mobile Unit-Danesmoate (Dublin, Ireland); Ashcombe House (Swainswick, Somerset)
- Length: 5:08
- Label: Geffen
- Songwriters: Robbie Robertson; U2
- Producers: Daniel Lanois; Robbie Robertson

"Sweet Fire of Love" is a song written and performed by Robbie Robertson and U2. It was included as the fourth track on his debut solo studio album, Robbie Robertson (1987). The song began with a guitar riff and a tom-tom pattern from a tape owned by Robertson, which he later presented to members of U2 at their recording studio in Ireland. They subsequently developed a demo around these ideas and collectively crafted some lyrics to supplement it. After its inclusion on Robertson's debut solo album, "Sweet Fire of Love" received airplay on album oriented rock stations in the United States and peaked at No. 7 on the Billboard Album Rock Tracks chart.

== Background ==
Robertson developed "Sweet Fire of Love" in Dublin, Ireland after a turbulent plane ride from New York City, where he had been working on the horn chord charts with Gil Evans for The Color of Money soundtrack. According to Robertson, plans had been arranged for Robertson to meet up with U2 at their recording studio in Dublin, where they would "try mixing words together to see what happens." Robertson had planned on writing some song ideas on the plane ride, but was kept from doing so from the guy sitting next to him, who had "a million things to say about everything" during the ride. Matters were further complicated when they reached Dublin, which was experiencing a hurricane at the time. After the plane "barely" landed, Robertson arrived to meet with U2.

When Robertson arrived, he still did not have any songs to show the band, and was thus sent up to one of their bedrooms to generate some ideas. He then grabbed a few tapes from a bag that he brought with him from New York City, one of which included audio of Robertson playing a guitar riff and a tom-tom. Robertson used this tape to craft some additional ideas and presented the results to Daniel Lanois and the members of U2 the following day. Robertson and U2 then exchanged lyrical ideas, with Robertson taking some words he jotted on scraps of paper from his pockets for some inspiration. The demo that was assembled had a duration of 22 minutes. While they were assembling the song, Robertson received a phone call from Eric Clapton asking for additional lyrics for "It's in the Way That You Use It". Once this was accomplished, Robertson returned to conduct additional work on "Sweet Fire of Love".

On "Sweet Fire of Love", Robertson sang his parts in a lower vocal register whereas Bono covered parts in his upper register. The song also features dueling guitar solos from both Robertson and The Edge. Commenting on the guitar solo, Robertson commented that he was excited about the idea of "guitars screaming at [and] talking to each other" on the song. Discussing the recording sessions for "Sweet Fire of Love" with Rolling Stone in 2023, Lanois recounted that Mullen "really delivered on the drums" and that "it was a very sweaty jam". He also commented that they were "looking for the magic moment" so that the song "had a chance to blossom." Following the sessions in Dublin, further work on "Sweet Fire of Love" was conducted at Peter Gabriel's recording studio, located around Bath, Somerset. David Bottrill, who was Gabriel's audio engineer, mentioned that the raw recording tapes from the Irish sessions consisted of "very long long arrangements that needed to be broken down. They were really live jams that were modified and improved."

== Release ==
"Sweet Fire of Love" was serviced to album oriented rock radio stations in October 1987. It received 37 adds to radio stations in that format during the week of October 30, 1987 according to Radio & Records, making it the third most added song in that category. It also debuted at No. 55 on the publication's AOR National Airplay list that same week. During this time, "Showdown at Big Sky", another track from Robertson's debut album, was also experiencing an increase in airplay on album oriented rock stations. By the week of November 20, 1987, 62 percent of album oriented rock radio stations reporting to Radio & Records had included the song on their playlists. "Sweet Fire of Love" later peaked at No. 7 on the Billboard Album Rock Tracks chart in 1988, spending a total of 15 weeks on that listing.

== Critical reception ==
Mark Prendergast of Sound on Sound highlighted the song's "thumping beat" courtesy of Adam Clayton and Larry Mullen Jr. along with the "fine milky guitar stretches by Edge" and "tough powerhouse guitar breaks by Robertson himself". Steven Dupler of Billboard labeled "Sweet Fire of Love" as one of the strongest tracks on Robertson's debut album. Writing for Stereo Review, Steve Simels said that the collaboration sounded "as grand as you'd hope" and also called the song's guitar dual "spectacular".

== Personnel ==
- Robbie Robertson – vocals, guitar
- Bono – vocals, bass
- The Edge – guitar
- Adam Clayton – bass
- Larry Mullen Jr. – drums
- Daniel Lanois – percussion, backing vocals

== Chart performance ==
Chart (1988)	Peak position
US Mainstream Rock (Billboard)	7
