= Robbie Robertson (album) =

Studio album by Robbie Robertson
- Released: October 27, 1987
- Recorded: 1986
- Studios: The Village Recorder (Los Angeles); U2 Mobile Unit-Danesmoate (Dublin); Ashcombe House (Somerset); A&M (Hollywood); Bearsville Sound (Bearsville); The Hit Factory (New York City)
- Genre: Rock
- Length: 44:24
- Label: Geffen
- Producers: Daniel Lanois; Robbie Robertson

Robbie Robertson chronology
Robbie Robertson (1987)	Storyville (1991)

Robbie Robertson is the solo debut album by Canadian rock musician Robbie Robertson, released in 1987. Though Robertson had been a professional musician since the late 1950s, notably a founder of and primary songwriter for The Band, this was his first solo album. Robbie Robertson won the Juno Award for "Album of the Year", and producers Daniel Lanois and Robertson won the "Producer of the Year" Juno award, both in 1989; there were no Juno Awards in 1988.

The album includes contributions from Rick Danko and Garth Hudson of The Band, as well as U2 and Peter Gabriel, both of whom had worked with Lanois. U2 were recording The Joshua Tree concurrent to the early stages of this album, and Gabriel had recorded So the previous year. U2's contributions are heard in the song "Sweet Fire of Love", a duet of sorts between Robertson and U2 lead singer Bono, and in "Testimony" again featuring backing by U2. Gabriel's contributions are heard on the song "Fallen Angel", which was dedicated to Richard Manuel, Robertson's former bandmate in The Band, and "Broken Arrow", which reverberates with Gabriel's signature Yamaha CP-80 electric piano. In addition, Tony Levin and Manu Katché, who were recording with Gabriel, are featured prominently on this record.

In 2005 the album was reissued together with its follow-up, Storyville, as a two-CD set, in an expanded edition, each with two bonus tracks.

== Background ==
After a lengthy sabbatical, Robertson announced via a 1983 article in Billboard magazine that he was returning and available to work on projects. Film producer Art Linson encouraged Robertson to focus on creating a solo record when the two vacationed together in Rome that same year. Robertson then began conceptualizing the idea, starting with creating a setting called "The Shadowland" where the songs in the album would take place. Robertson imagined The Shadowland to be a mythical place "that moves around according to [the] clouds that cover [it]", and imagined himself to be a wanderer who would narrate the events that would take place in this mythical locale.

Robertson was signed to EMI Records by then head of A&R and longtime The Band fan Gary Gersh. Preliminary discussions and preproduction for Robertson's first solo album began in autumn 1984. Gersh then moved to Geffen Records, and convinced the label to buy out Robertson's contract with EMI.

Robertson spent $50,000 on pre-production work traveling across Europe to vet potential producers. The first producer Robertson considered to produce the album was fellow Canadian Daniel Lanois. After meeting up with several more potential producers, Robertson decided to work with Lanois because of their shared interest in experimentation. After Lanois finished a stage of the production work with U2 on what would become their album The Joshua Tree, Robertson let Lanois know that he was ready to begin work on the album. The two began production and recording in July 1986.

== Recording ==
Robertson kept an office on the property of the recording studio The Village Recorder in West Los Angeles, California, where he would work out ideas for the album. Much of the album was recorded there. Robertson's basic backing band included guitar player Bill Dillon, a friend of Lanois' who had also played for Ronnie Hawkins, as well as bass player Tony Levin, and Parisian drummer Manu Katché. Robertson brought in drummer Terry Bozzio after Katché had to return to Paris. Robertson also brought in The BoDeans to provide group vocals for some of the tracks on the album, most notably on "Showdown at Big Sky". BoDeans member Sam Llanas created a faux female voice that was used on the chorus of "Somewhere Down the Crazy River". The Band members Garth Hudson and Rick Danko also appear on the album, as do Ivan Neville (son of R&B singer Aaron Neville) and jazz bassist Larry Klein.

Lanois broke away from the album's production to continue working with U2 in August 1986, while Robertson worked with director Martin Scorsese on creating and composing the score for the film The Color of Money (1986). While Lanois was working with U2, he invited Robertson to come out to Ireland to work in the home studio where U2 were recording. Robertson flew to Ireland in late August 1986, arriving in the aftermath of Hurricane Charley. Robertson had just finished work on The Color of Money, and arrived with nothing prepared except for a Gil Evans horn chart left over from The Color of Money and a recording he had made of a guitar riff accompanied by a tom tom drum. Robertson fleshed out some lyrical ideas inspired by the hurricane and the turbulent flight over, while Lanois worked with the members of U2 on extracting a musical concept from the guitar riff Robertson had presented to them. Robertson and U2 lead singer Bono then improvised a set of lyrics in the studio while the band's instrumentalists played behind them, creating a 22-minute track that was edited into the song "Sweet Fire of Love". Lanois then used the Gil Evans horn arrangements as the basis of another track entitled "Testimony", which also featured the members of U2.

Robertson then flew to Bath, England, to work with Peter Gabriel in his home studio. Robertson had been devising a track entitled "Fallen Angel" about a soul passing into the next dimension. Robertson attributed the direction he was taking to the recent passing of fellow Band alumnus Richard Manuel, who had committed suicide in a hotel room in Florida in March 1986, and dedicated the song to him. Robertson loved the "ghosty, angelic sound" Gabriel achieved when stacking his vocals, and requested that Gabriel record background vocals for the song, which he agreed to. Gabriel also provided keyboards on "Fallen Angel", as well as keyboards and drum programming on "Broken Arrow", a song which was inspired by Robertson's Native American heritage. Whereas Robertson was reluctant to invoke his Native American heritage during his time recording with The Band, he decided to embrace it for his solo album, saying that "it feels very natural for me to express this thing that I've had deep inside me all my life." During the recording sessions, Robertson would play the musicians tapes of music from American Indians.

Robertson also recorded at Bearsville Studios near Woodstock, New York, which was founded by his former manager Albert Grossman. At Bearsville Studios, Robertson worked on a version of "What About Now" that was withheld from the final release of the album, as well the track "American Roulette," which was inspired by a screenplay he had written. Robertson utilized Lone Justice lead singer Maria McKee as backing vocalist for these two tracks. Rick Danko also contributed additional vocals on "Sonny Got Caught in the Moonlight" at the request of Robertson while the album was being mixed at Bearsville Studios. Robertson originally planned on only using his voice on "Sonny Got Caught in the Moonlight", but changed his mind after realizing that he had already used other vocalists throughout the record.

After Lanois finished the album's mixing process, Bob Clearmountain was brought in to remix the album during the last week of June and the first two weeks of July 1987 on a digital cassette machine from Japan. During this process, Clearmountain and Gersh would transfer the complete mixes onto a digital audio tape and half-inch analog tape and compare the sound quality. The two preferred the mixes on the digital audio tape and used these for the mastering process. When comparing his mixes to the ones created by Clearmountain, Lanois said that his versions were grittier and featured less reverb on the drums. He added that "I'm not suggesting some of the mixes didn't get better, but I guarantee you some of the roughs have more rust and more ragged moments."

== Songwriting ==
=== "Fallen Angel" ===
"Fallen Angel" is lyrically about Robertson's former bandmate Richard Manuel, who took his own life in 1986. Peter Gabriel sang background with Robertson on this track and also contributed keyboard overdubs, which were processed with a Roland effects pedal and a Delta Lab DL2 harmonizer/delay. The song also features contributions from another former Band member Garth Hudson.

=== "Showdown at Big Sky" ===
Sam Llanas, from the BoDeans, provided the distinctive background vocals on this song, The BoDeans' Kurt Neumann and Llanas contributed backing vocals to "Somewhere Down the Crazy River" and "American Roulette". Because of the popularity of the BoDeans in their home state of Wisconsin, "Showdown at Big Sky" received significant airplay on Milwaukee AOR radio. Robertson's single reached No. 48 in the Canadian Top 100 and No. 8 in the CanCon charts.

=== "Broken Arrow" ===
Robbie Robertson's version reached number 29 on the RPM CanCon charts in 1988. Rod Stewart recorded a version of "Broken Arrow" in 1991 for his album Vagabond Heart. Stewart's version of the song was released as a single on August 26, 1991, with an accompanying music video, reaching number 20 on the US Billboard Hot 100 chart and number two in Canada.

"Broken Arrow" was also performed live by the Grateful Dead from 1993 to 1995 with Phil Lesh on vocals. Grateful Dead spinoff groups The Dead, Phil Lesh and Friends, and The Other Ones have also performed the song, each time with Lesh on vocals .

=== "American Roulette" ===
The lyrics of "American Roulette" relate to cultivation of celebrities in America and their ultimate destruction, with each verse dealing with James Dean, Elvis Presley, and Marilyn Monroe respectively. Robertson wanted the song to have a female vocalist during the choruses, so he asked Maria McKee, who had just returned from a European tour, to sing these parts.

=== "Somewhere Down the Crazy River" ===
When asked about the inspiration for the album's single "Somewhere Down the Crazy River", Lanois commented, "Robbie Robertson was describing what it was like to hang out in Arkansas with Levon Helm in his old neighbourhood. He was telling me about the hot nights and fishing with dynamite, and was asking someone for directions for someplace somewhere down the crazy river. ... I had presented him with this instrument that [Brian] Eno introduced me to called the Suzuki Omnichord, like an electric autoharp. He found a little chord sequence with it that was sweet and wonderful. As he was developing his chord sequence I recorded him and superimposed his storytelling, which I was secretly recording, on top. That was the birth of 'Somewhere Down The Crazy River.' It's kind of like a guy with a deep voice telling you about steaming nights in Arkansas." This song is notable as Robertson's only solo hit in the United Kingdom, reaching number 15 on the UK Singles Chart. His follow-up single there, "Fallen Angel" (also from the album), reached number 95.

== Release ==
Released on October 26, 1987, Robbie Robertson peaked at No. 35 on the Billboard 200, remaining in the Top 40 for 3 weeks. Prior to the album's release, Radio & Records announced that Westwood One would air a radio special titled The Robbie Robertson Album Premiere Party. The publication said that the radio special would be hosted by Sky Daniels of San Francisco's KFOG on October 22 and feature a Q&A portion where listeners could call a toll-free hotline to ask Robertson questions about his career and debut album.

Robbie Robertson produced several hits on the Billboard Mainstream Rock charts, with "Showdown at Big Sky" coming in the highest (No. 2) and "Sweet Fire of Love" the second highest (no. 7). The album was nominated for a Grammy Award for "Best Rock / Vocal Album". Robbie Robertson was certified gold in the United States in 1991. Music videos for "Fallen Angel" and "Showdown at Big Sky" were also created on the Acoma Pueblo American Indian reservation in New Mexico.

== Critical reception ==
Professional ratings
Review scores
Source	Rating
New Musical Express	8/10
Uncut	6/10

Robbie Robertson was well received at the time of its release. The Canadian music magazine RPM thought that the album had "several really lean numbers" and that it would unlikely go unnoticed with the contributions of U2 and Peter Gabriel. In their review of the album, the pan-European magazine Music & Media felt that the album had "a beautiful blend of material", with its musical roots "solidly in US soil" and the presence of Gabriel and U2 providing additional "European influences" to the tracks. Billboard called it a "beautifully realized first solo work" with a "powerful collection of songs". Cashbox felt that the album was a "creatively stunning, spiritually fulfilled work" with "astute and penetrating" lyrics.

The album was listed in the Top Ten Albums of the Year by several of the critics in Billboard magazine's 1987 "The Critics' Choice" end-of-the-year feature, and in February 1988, the album was listed in Stereo Review magazine's "Best Recordings of The Month" feature. In 1989, the album was listed as No. 77 in Rolling Stone's "100 Best Albums of the Eighties". It also placed at No. 13 in the annual Pazz & Jop Critics Poll published in The Village Voice.

The album did receive negative criticism as well, with Greil Marcus later deriding it as "draped in curtains of overproduction" with "themes so elaborated and vocals so disguised it was hard to discern an actual human being behind any of it." Robert Christgau wrote that it "took some guts for such an unrepentant Americana-monger [like Robertson] to risk Anglophobe wrath" by collaborating with Gabriel and Bono, but he was very disappointed with the results and graded the album with a C+.

Barney Hoskyns dismissed it as sounding "bloated and grandiose," with Robertson "overreaching himself and getting lost in flights of airy verbosity." Elvis Costello, a lifelong fan of The Band, said he "didn't like it at all," and that "it was like [Robertson] decided to make a Peter Gabriel album, whereas his songwriting was much more interesting and enigmatic when he was working on that smaller scale. It's almost like the best songs on the record are the ones that operate on that scale but have then been artificially inflated with steroids to become this widescreen Peter Gabriel music."

== Track listing ==
All tracks are written by Robbie Robertson, with additional writers noted.

Side one
No.	Title	Writer(s)	Length
1.	"Fallen Angel"	Martin Page	5:52
2.	"Showdown at Big Sky"		4:43
3.	"Broken Arrow"		5:17
4.	"Sweet Fire of Love"	U2	5:08

Side two
No.	Title	Length
5.	"American Roulette"	4:46
6.	"Somewhere Down the Crazy River"	4:44
7.	"Hell's Half Acre"	3:45
8.	"Sonny Got Caught in the Moonlight"	3:45
9.	"Testimony"	4:45
Total length:		44:24

2005 expanded edition bonus tracks
No.	Title	Length
10.	"Christmas Must Be Tonight" (from the Scrooged soundtrack, 1988)	4:51
11.	"Testimony" (edited 12" remix)	6:34
Total length:		55:49

== Personnel ==
==== Musicians ====
- Robbie Robertson – lead vocals, backing vocals (1–3, 6), guitar, guitar solo (2, 4, 5, 7), keyboards (5, 8, 9)
- Peter Gabriel – vocals (1), keyboards (1, 3), drum programming (3)
- Bono – vocals (4), backing vocals (9), bass (4), guitar (9)
- Garth Hudson – keyboards (1, 5)
- Martin Page – drum programming (1)
- Bill Dillon – guitar (1, 2, 5–9), backing vocals (2)
- The Edge – guitar (4, 9), guitar solo (4)
- Eluriel "Tinker" Barfield – bass (1, 5)
- Larry Klein – bass (2)
- Abraham Laboriel – bass (3)
- Adam Clayton – bass (4, 9)
- Hans Christian – bass (5)
- Tony Levin – Chapman Stick (5, 7), bass (6, 8)
- Manu Katché – drums (1, 2, 6–8), percussion (1, 7, 8)
- Terry Bozzio – drums (3, 5)
- Larry Mullen Jr. – drums (4, 9)
- Daniel Lanois – percussion (2, 3, 4, 8), guitar (5, 8), Omnichord (6), backing vocals (2, 3, 4)
- Sam Llanas – backing vocals (2, 5, 6)
- Kurt Neumann – backing vocals (2, 5)
- Maria McKee – backing vocals (5)
- Cary Butler – backing vocals (8)
- Rick Danko – backing vocals (8)
- Ivan Neville – backing vocals (9)
- Gil Evans Horn Section – horns (9)

==== Technical ====
- Produced by Daniel Lanois and Robbie Robertson
- Executive producer – Gary Gersh
- Associate producer and engineer – Jim Scott
- Additional engineers – David Bottrill, Chris Isca, and Pat McCarthy
- Assistant engineers – Cary Butler, Thom Cadley, Jeff DeMorris, Marc DeSisto, Jay Healy, and Mark McKenna
- Mixed by Bob Clearmountain
- Mastered by Bob Ludwig at Masterdisk (New York City, NY)
- Photography – Chris Callis
- Design – Jeri McManus Heiden
- Management – Nick Wechsler

== Charts ==
=== Weekly charts ===
Album
Chart (1987–1988)	Peak position
Canada Top Albums/CDs (RPM)	12
Dutch Albums (Album Top 100)	14
German Albums (Offizielle Top 100)	54
New Zealand Albums (RMNZ)	7
Norwegian Albums (VG-lista)	5
Swedish Albums (Sverigetopplistan)	13
UK Albums (Official Charts)	23
US Billboard 200	38

=== Year-end charts ===
Chart (1988)	Position
Dutch Albums (MegaCharts)	93

=== Single ===
Year	Single	Chart	Peak Position
1987	"Showdown at Big Sky"	Billboard Mainstream Rock Tracks	2
1987	"Sweet Fire of Love"	Billboard Mainstream Rock Tracks	7
1988	"American Roulette"	Billboard Mainstream Rock Tracks	21
1988	"Somewhere Down the Crazy River"	Billboard Mainstream Rock Tracks	24
1988	"Somewhere Down the Crazy River"	UK Singles Charts	15

== Certifications ==
Region	Certification	Certified units/sales
Canada (Music Canada)	2× Platinum	200,000^{^}
France	—	34,900
New Zealand (RMNZ)	Gold	7,500^{^}
United Kingdom (BPI)	Gold	100,000^{^}
United States (RIAA)	Gold	500,000^{^}
^{^} Shipments figures based on certification alone.
