= Fallen Angel (Robbie Robertson song) =

1987 song by Robbie Robertson

Single by Robbie Robertson

from the album Robbie Robertson
- B-side: "Hell's Half Acre"
- Released: October 31, 1987
- Studio: Bearsville Studios, Woodstock, New York; Ashcombe House, Somerset; The Village Recorder (West Los Angeles, California)
- Length: 5:52
- Label: Geffen
- Songwriters: Robbie Robertson; Martin Page
- Producers: Daniel Lanois; Robbie Robertson

"Fallen Angel" is a 1987 song by Robbie Robertson, included as the first track on Robertson's debut solo album Robbie Robertson. The song was co-written by Martin Page and Robertson, the latter of whom also sang lead vocals on the track. It was issued by Geffen Records as the album's first single in Europe, whereas in North America and Oceania, "Showdown at Big Sky" was released as the first single instead.

"Fallen Angel" was written as a tribute to Richard Manuel, who was a member of the Band with Robertson. The song featured contributions from Garth Hudson, who also played with Robertson in the Band, and Peter Gabriel, who provided keyboards and harmony vocals to the track. A music video was also created to promote the song, which was directed by David Hogan.

== Composition ==
Robertson wrote "Fallen Angel" as a tribute to Richard Manuel, a member of the Band who committed suicide in 1986. Robertson said that he wrote "Fallen Angel" with "the mood and ambiance first" around a heartbeat rhythm with "crying vocals". Reflecting on "Fallen Angel" in a 1987 interview, Robertson expressed his opinion that his vocals during the intro were reminiscent of Manuel's vocal tendencies.

For the lyrics, Robertson's original plan was to write a song around the "mythology" of angels in the heavens. When Robertson refined the lyrics further, he identified them as being more personal than what he originally envisioned and came to a realization that he had written "Fallen Angel" for Manuel. Robertson commented that it was cathartic for him to arrive at the realization that he had created a song that paid homage to Manuel. He also recalled that he encountered difficulties when writing "Fallen Angel" with Manuel in mind, saying that "sometimes it tore me apart". Robertsons said that "Fallen Angel" was not written "directly about Richard", and that it was "more for him, like a little prayer," adding that the lyrics reflected the sentiments that he "never got to say to him."

I didn't know what I was writing about for quite a while. Maybe I just didn't want to face the fact. We have this little built-in wall against those things sometimes. When I did come to terms with what the song’s about, it felt good to me to face up to it. It was a cleansing feeling to write this song in honor of a friend of mine who died.

== Recording ==
The recording sessions for "Fallen Angel" began at The Village Recorder in Los Angeles. For the bass guitar, Lanois recalled that he guided Tony Levin through some bass parts by asking him to repeat the melodic ideas that he felt worked best within the context of the song, although the liner notes instead credit Tinker Barfield with playing bass on "Fallen Angel". Work on the song continued in Bath, Somerset at Peter Gabriel's Ashcombe House studio after the conclusion of Robertson's time in Dublin, where he worked with the members of U2 on "Sweet Fire of Love" and "Testimony". Daniel Lanois, who co-produced Robertson's debut album and also served as a producer for some of Gabriel's albums, had informed Robertson that Gabriel's studio in Bath would serve as a suitable environment for Robertson.

When contemplating the backing vocals for "Fallen Angel", Robertson arrived at the conclusion that he did not want members of his backing band to cover the parts he conceived and also decided against hiring a group of female vocalists to cover these parts. Robertson said that he asked Gabriel to sing on "Fallen Angel" "because the song was my little hymn and respect to my old partner in the Band, Richard Manuel, and I needed a singer who had this heart-wrenching sound." Robertson was also fond of Gabriel's approach to his stacking vocal harmonies, describing them as having a "ghosty" and "angelic" sound. After Robertson played Gabriel "Fallen Angel", Gabriel agreed to participate on the recording and worked with Robertson on some vocal parts. Gabriel spent one day multitracking his vocals with David Bottrill serving as the audio engineer. Robertson remembered that Gabriel was "really happy" with the vocals, which pleased Robertson, who said that it made him "feel really good that he liked it as much as I wanted him to".

Garth Hudson, another member of the Band, played keyboards on "Fallen Angel". Lanois said in a 2023 interview with Rolling Stone that he asked Hudson to contribute to the recording. Gabriel played another keyboard part on a Yamaha keyboard that was processed with various effects units, including a Roland chorus effect pedal and a Delta Lab DL2 harmonizer/delay unit. A dry signal and processed signal from the piano was then sent to the mixing console to achieve a stereophonic sound.

Robertson sang parts of the song in what Andy Gill of Q magazine characterized as a "strained falsetto." Barney Hoskyns, who served as a biographer for the Band, commented that Robertson "almost managed to simulate the kind of falsetto which had been the Band pianist's [Richard Manuel's] trademark." Gill also described the intro as having "low bass rumbles" and highlighted the song's "swirling guitar drones" played by Robertson and Bill Dillon. The song concludes with what Mark Prendergast of Sound on Sound described as an "atmospheric finale" with keyboards and percussion "splashing against each other."

== Release ==
Geffen Records originally released "Fallen Angel" on October 31, 1987. All editions of the single had "Hell's Half Acre" as a B-side and the twelve-inch single also included the track "Tailgating". The pan-European music publication Music & Media listed "Fallen Angel" 15th on its list tabulating airplay from the Dutch national pop radio stations Radio 2 and Radio 3. The song later reached No. 64 in the Netherlands and spent five weeks on the Dutch Single Top 100.

Following the commercial success of "Somewhere Down the Crazy River" in the United Kingdom, "Fallen Angel" was reissued by Geffen Records, this time with the twelve-inch single being appended with "Testimony" and the CD single featuring "Somewhere Down the Crazy River". The single subsequently debuted and peaked at No. 95 on the UK singles chart.

David Hogan directed the music video for "Fallen Angel", which was produced by Limelight Productions in Los Angeles. The music video was filmed at Acoma Pueblo, which was the same location that Robertson's "Showdown at Big Sky" video was filmed.

== Critical reception ==
Cashbox referred to "Fallen Angel" as a "stunning song" and a "dark tribute to his fallen friend". Chris McGowan, a music critic for Billboard, called "Fallen Angel" "one of the year's most moving songs" in the 1987 "Year In Music and Video" column. Reviewing the single for Music Week, Jerry Smith said that the "atmospherically produced" song "should go far" commercially.

Writing for Sound on Sound, Mark Prendergast characterized "Fallen Angel" as a "wonderful piece of sonic manipulation by Lanois", adding that the song's "overwhelming emotional punch is provided by Peter Gabriel's brilliant vocal harmonies". Steve Simels of Stereo Review wrote that song resembled "a swirling collage of Africanisms a la guest vocalist Peter Gabriel rather than the elegiac ballad you might expect." Annie Zaleski of The Guardian included the song on its list of Robertson's 10 best recordings.

== Personnel ==
- Robbie Robertson – lead and backing vocals, guitar
- Bill Dillon – guitar
- Peter Gabriel – keyboards, backing vocals
- Garth Hudson – keyboards
- "Tinker" Barfield – bass
- Manu Katché – drums, percussion
- Martin Page – drum programming

== Charts ==
| Chart (1987–1988) | Peak position |
|---|---|
| Netherlands (Single Top 100) | 64 |
| UK Singles (OCC) | 95 |
