= Showdown at Big Sky =

1987 song by Robbie Robertson

Single by Robbie Robertson

from the album Robbie Robertson
- B-side: "Hell's Half Acre"
- Released: November 1987
- Studio: Bearsville Studios, Woodstock, New York
- Length: 4:43
- Label: Geffen
- Songwriter: Robbie Robertson
- Producers: Daniel Lanois; Robbie Robertson

"Showdown At Big Sky" is a 1987 song by Robbie Robertson, released on Robertson's debut solo album Robbie Robertson. It was issued by Geffen Records as the album's first single in both North America and Oceania, whereas in "Europe", "Fallen Angel" was lifted as the first single instead.

"Showdown At Big Sky" peaked at No. 2 on the United States Billboard Album Rock Tracks listing and also charted in Canada and New Zealand. The song's lyrical content details anti-nuclear war sentiments, environmental themes, and life on Native American reservations. A music video was also created to promote "Showdown At Big Sky", which was directed by David Hogan.

== Background ==
Robertson wrote "Showdown At Big Sky" as a rebuke of nuclear weapons from the perspective of a Native American. He commented in a 1987 interview that he was initially reluctant to write a song relating to the end of the world, but ultimately found the subject matter to be salient enough to craft a song around the premise. Some of the lyrics were spurred by a vision Robertson had about people pleading with world leaders not to perpetuate a global arms race. He also said that the lyrical themes related to "the simplicity of Indian life", being "true to the Earth, the sky and the elements", and the fear of compromising this to nuclear warfare.

When Bill Flanagan of Musician magazine visited Bearsville Studios in Woodstock, New York to document the creation of Robertson's debut solo album, "Showdown At Big Sky" was one of the tracks that Bob Clearmountain was mixing at the time. Flanagan reported that Robertson indirectly suggested the idea of placing Bill Dillon's guitar earlier in the mix during these recording sessions by remarking: "The way Bill's guitar comes up there is great. It makes me wish it started to happen even sooner!"

== Release ==
Billboard reported in its October 3, 1987 edition of the publication that "Showdown At Big Sky" was slated to be the first single from Robertson's self-titled album. Radio & Records confirmed its status as the first single from Robbie Robertson in the October 9, 1987 edition of the publication. That same week, it received 120 adds to album oriented rock radio stations to the publication, making it that week's most added song in that format. The program director for Miami's WGTR radio station mentioned that the "fresh, contemporary sound" of "Showdown at Big Sky" had elicited an "instant reaction" from its listeners. That same week, the song debuted at No. 25 on the Billboard Album Rock Tracks chart during the week dated October 17, 1987. It later peaked at No. 2 on that chart and eventually spent a total of 17 weeks on that listing.

Cashbox reviewed "Showdown at Big Sky" during the week dated November 28, 1987, calling it a "brilliant solo debut" with "AOR roots". Radio & Records reported that the song had shifted to contemporary hit radio in its December 4, 1987 publication. That same month, it debuted at No. 32 on the Official New Zealand Music Chart for the week dated December 13, 1987. It later peaked at No. 17 in January of the following year and spent nine weeks in the top 50.

In Canada, RPM magazine listed "Showdown At Big Sky" as a "single to watch" in its December 19, 1987 edition of the publication. That same week, it debuted at No. 96 on the RPM 100 singles chart. It later peaked at No. 48 during its eighth week on the listing.

== Music video ==
Godley & Creme was originally approached to direct the music video, which was expected to launch on MTV in October 1987. David Hogan ultimately directed the music video, with Boris Malden and Amanda Pirie producing the video through Limelight Productions. Radio & Records reported that the music video had been added to MTV during the final week of October, where it was listed as a "Sneak Preview" video.

The music video was filmed at Acoma Pueblo in New Mexico. Robertson was granted permission to film on the Acoma Pueblo lands due to his Native American heritage. Robertson had also filmed his music video for "Fallen Angel" at Acoma Pueblo, which was directed and produced by the same team responsible for the "Showdown At Big Sky" music video. Discussing his time filming the music video, Robertson said that the experience was "one of the highlights of my life, this last week with the Indians. It just makes everything seem so petty."

The music video for "Showdown At Big Sky" features Robertson, the BoDeans, and various tribe members interspersed throughout. Steven Dupler of Billboard described the visual footage as a blend of "soft daytime desert pastels with smoky, firelit night scenes" and called the music video's cinematography, editing and pacing "top notch." In his year-end column, Dupler also listed the song on his list of the top ten music videos of the year, saying that it had a "powerful visual impact."

== Personnel ==
- Robbie Robertson – lead and backing vocals, guitar solo
- Bill Dillon – guitar, backing vocals
- Larry Klein – bass
- Manu Katché – drums
- Daniel Lanois – percussion, backing vocals
- Bodeans – backing vocals

== Chart performance ==
Chart (1987–1988)	Peak position
Canada Top Singles (RPM)	48
New Zealand (Recorded Music NZ)	17
US Mainstream Rock (Billboard)	2
