= Storyville (album) =

Studio album by Robbie Robertson
- Released: September 30, 1991
- Recorded: 1991
- Studios: The Village Recorder (Los Angeles); Southlake Studios (Metairie); Ultrasonic Sound Studio (New Orleans); Kingsway (New Orleans); Zeitgeist Studios (Brentwood); Ground Control Studio (Santa Monica); St. Claire Studio (Scotland)
- Genre: Rock
- Length: 54:54
- Label: Geffen
- Producers: Robbie Robertson; Stephen Hague; Gary Gersh; Martin Page

Robbie Robertson chronology
Robbie Robertson (1987)	Storyville (1991)	Music for The Native Americans (1994)

Professional ratings
Review scores
Source	Rating
AllMusic	4/5 stars
Robert Christgau	C
Los Angeles Times	3/4 stars
Q	2/5 stars
Rolling Stone	4/5 stars

Storyville is second solo album by Canadian rock musician Robbie Robertson, released on September 30, 1991. It is focused on the famous jazz homeland section of New Orleans and on that part of the South in general. He contributed one song ("Breakin' the Rules") to Wim Wenders' soundtrack to his 1991 film, Until the End of the World.

Music & Media reported that Storyville had sold 10,000 copies during its first week, with this figure rising to 15,000 units by the middle of October 1991. Geffen Records primarily promoted the album through print media, with Robertson also conducting an interview on Pandoras Jukebox in Norway, which represented the only television promotion that Robertson did in that country.

In 2005 the album was reissued together with Robbie Robertson as 2CD in an expanded edition, both with two bonus tracks. Cover photography by Syndey Byrd, Art Directed by Mark Andresen.

== Track listing ==
All tracks are written by Robbie Robertson, with additional writers noted.

No.	Title	Writer(s)	Length
1.	"Night Parade"		5:05
2.	"Hold Back the Dawn"		5:25
3.	"Go Back to Your Woods"	Bruce Hornsby	4:48
4.	"Soap Box Preacher"		5:17
5.	"Day of Reckoning (Burnin' for You)"	David Ricketts	6:43
6.	"What About Now"	Ivan Neville	5:08
7.	"Shake This Town"		5:21
8.	"Breakin' the Rules"		5:48
9.	"Resurrection"		5:18
10.	"Sign of the Rainbow"		5:24
Total length:			54:54

== Personnel ==
==== Musicians ====
- Robbie Robertson – vocals, electric guitar, guitar solo (1–5, 8–10), acoustic guitar (4, 6), organ (4)
- Bill Dillon – guitar (1–2, 4–5, 7, 9), mandolin (4)
- Leo Nocentelli – rhythm guitar (3)
- David Ricketts – guitar (5), bass (5), keyboards (5), programming (5)
- Paul Buchanan – guitar (8), backing vocals (8)
- Ronnie Foster – Hammond organ (1)
- Paul Moore – keyboards (2, 5, 8, 10), drum programming (8)
- Stephen Hague – keyboards (2, 7), keyboard bass (4), programming (7)
- Bruce Hornsby – keyboards (3), backing vocal (3)
- Art Neville – organ (3), backing vocals (3)
- Garth Hudson – keyboards (4, 7, 9)
- Ivan Neville – keyboards (6), backing vocals (6)
- Charlie Pollard – keyboards (7), programming (7)
- Martin Page – piano (10), keyboards (10), programming (10), backing vocals (10)
- Guy Pratt – bass (1, 2, 6, 9)
- George Porter Jr. – bass (3), backing vocals (3)
- Mark Leonard – bass (7)
- Robert Bell – bass (8, 10), drum programming (8)
- Jerry Marotta – drums (1, 4, 6, 10), percussion (10)
- Billy Ward – drums (2)
- Russell Batiste, Jr. – drums (3)
- Ronald Jones – drums (4, 8)
- John Robinson – drums (5, 7)
- Zigaboo Modeliste – drums (9)
- Alex Acuña – percussion (1–2, 5–6, 9)
- Cyril Neville – percussion (3)
- Jared Levine – hi-hat (5)
- Leon "Ndugu" Chancler – snare (6)
- Ginger Baker – skip snare (7)
- Warren Bell – soprano saxophone (1, 4, 9)
- Anthony Dagardi – soprano saxophone (3, 8)
- Dan Higgins – alto saxophone (5)
- Amadee Castenell – tenor saxophone (1, 3, 4, 8, 9)
- Fred Kemp – tenor saxophone (1, 4, 9)
- Richard Mitchell – tenor saxophone (5)
- Carl Blouin – baritone saxophone (3, 8)
- Stacey Cole – trumpet (1, 4, 9)
- Brian Graber – trumpet (3, 8)
- Mark Isham – trumpet (5), flugelhorn (5), horn arrangements (5)
- Duane Van Paulin – trombone (1, 3, 4, 8, 9)
- Ken Kugler – trombone (5)
- John J. Mitchell – bass clarinet (5)
- Rebirth Brass Band
  - Roderick Paulin – horns (7), percussion (7)
  - Keith Frazier – horns (7), percussion (7)
  - Keith Anderson – horns (7), percussion (7)
  - Glen Andrews – horns (7), percussion (7)
  - Stafford Agee – horns (7), percussion (7)
  - Ajay Mallery – horns (7), percussion (7)
  - Philip Frazier – horns (7), percussion (7)
  - Kermit Ruffins – horns (7), percussion (7)
- Wardell Quezergue – horn arrangements (1, 3–4, 8–9)
- Code Blue
  - Yadonna Wise – backing vocals (1, 3, 7)
  - Dorene Wise – backing vocals (1, 3, 7)
- Rick Danko – backing vocals (2)
- Big Chief Bo Dollis of the Wild Magnolias of Mardi Gras Indians – backing vocals (3), chant (3)
- Big Chief Monk Boudreaux of the Golden Eagles of Mardi Gras Indians – backing vocals (3), chant (3)
- Neil Young – backing vocals (4)
- Yvonne Williams – backing vocals (5)
- Carmen Twillie – backing vocals (5)
- Clydene Jackson – backing vocals (5)
- Roy Galloway – backing vocals (5)
- Aaron Neville – backing vocals (6, 10)
- Zion Harmonizers
  - Joseph Warrick – backing vocals (7, 9, 10)
  - Louis Jones – backing vocals (7, 9, 10)
  - Nolan Washington – backing vocals (7, 9, 10)
  - Willie Williams – backing vocals (7, 9, 10)
  - Howard Bowie – backing vocals (7, 9, 10)
- David Baerwald – backing vocals (7)
- Mike Mills – backing vocals (7)

==== Technical ====
- Produced by Robbie Robertson, Stephen Hague (1, 2, 4–10), Gary Gersh (3), and Martin Page (10)
- Associate producer and engineer – Steve Nye
- Additional engineers – Jim Scott, George Cowan, Ken Jordan, Malcolm Burn, and Martin Brumbach
- Assistant engineers – Jeff DeMorris, Alex Rodriguez, Mark Howard, Steve Himmelfarb, and Steve Reynolds
- Mixed by Bob Clearmountain
- Mastered by Bob Ludwig at Masterdisk (New York City, NY)
- Project coordinator and production assistant – Jared Levine
- Creative direction – Robin Sloane
- Art direction and design – Kevin Reagan
- Photography – Syndey Bird
- Set designer – Mark Andresen
- Photoshoot coordinator – Lynn Goddard
- Management – Nick Wechsler (Addis-Wechsler and Associates)

== Charts ==
Album

Year	Chart	Position
1991	Australian Albums (ARIA)	113
1991	Canada Top Albums/CDs (RPM)	9
1991	UK Pop Albums	30
1991	US Billboard 200	69

Single

Year	Single	Chart	Position
1991	"What About Now"	RPM Hit Tracks	4
1991	"What About Now"	RPM 40AC	7
1991	"What About Now"	Billboard Mainstream Rock Tracks	15
1991	"What About Now"	Billboard Modern Rock Tracks	28
1991	"Go Back to Your Woods"	RPM Hit Tracks	9
1991	"Go Back to Your Woods"	RPM 40AC	5
1991	"Go Back to Your Woods"	Billboard Mainstream Rock Tracks	32
