= Gary Gersh =

American music industry executive

- Occupation: Music industry executive

Gary Gersh is an American music industry executive who previously managed musical artists including Nirvana, Soundgarden and the Foo Fighters. As president of AEG's touring division he has worked with bands and musicians such as Luke Combs, Tyler, the Creator and Panic! at the Disco to develop international arena tours. Gersh has described the division as "a central, internal operation that would sign and execute tours globally". He describes AEG as "just one more place people can move up".

== Early career ==
Gersh began his career in the music industry in the 1980s. As an A&R executive at Geffen Records, he signed both Nirvana and Sonic Youth to Geffen imprint DGC Records. During the 1990s he headed Capitol Records and founded G.A.S Entertainment with John Silva. Before joining AEG he headed the management company The Artist Organization, where he worked with artists including Lenny Kravitz, Portugal. the Man and John Legend.
