= Ashcombe House, Somerset =

Country house in England

Ashcombe House
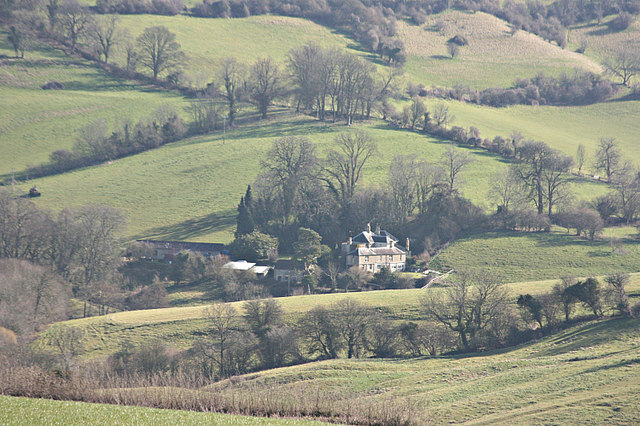

- Location within Somerset

General information
- Location: Swainswick, Somerset, Tadwick Lane
- Coordinates: 51.4236°N 2.3650°W
- Completed: Early 19th century

Ashcombe House at Swainswick, north-east of Bath in Somerset, England is a Gothic revival country house. It is a Grade II listed building.

Ashcombe House stands on the slopes of the Lam Valley in 25 acres (100,000 m^{2}) of grounds. It dates from the early nineteenth century, and was altered in the late nineteenth century. It started life as a hunting lodge, and there are the remains of the former kennels in the grounds. The 1900 1:10,560 scale (6 inch) Ordnance Survey map shows the building was known at that time as Ashcombe Farm, with Ashcombe Wood lying to the north-east of it. The house has a rear wing constructed from a converted coach house and stables, and has nine bedrooms and six reception rooms, including a Georgian ballroom. The house was on the market in 2003 for £1.6 million.

Musician Peter Gabriel rented the property between 1978 and 1987 as his family home and converted the house's barn into his home studio, where he recorded three of his albums: his 1982 album Peter Gabriel, commonly known as 4 (or as Security in the US); the soundtrack for the film Birdy, which he recorded between October and December 1984; and his album So, recorded in 1985 and released in 1986. The track "My Secret Place" from the Joni Mitchell album Chalk Mark in a Rain Storm was recorded at Gabriel's studio at Ashcombe House in 1986, as were parts of the 1987 Robbie Robertson album Robbie Robertson (although the sleeve credits erroneously locate Ashcombe House in London).
