= Bill Flanagan =

American writer and television executive

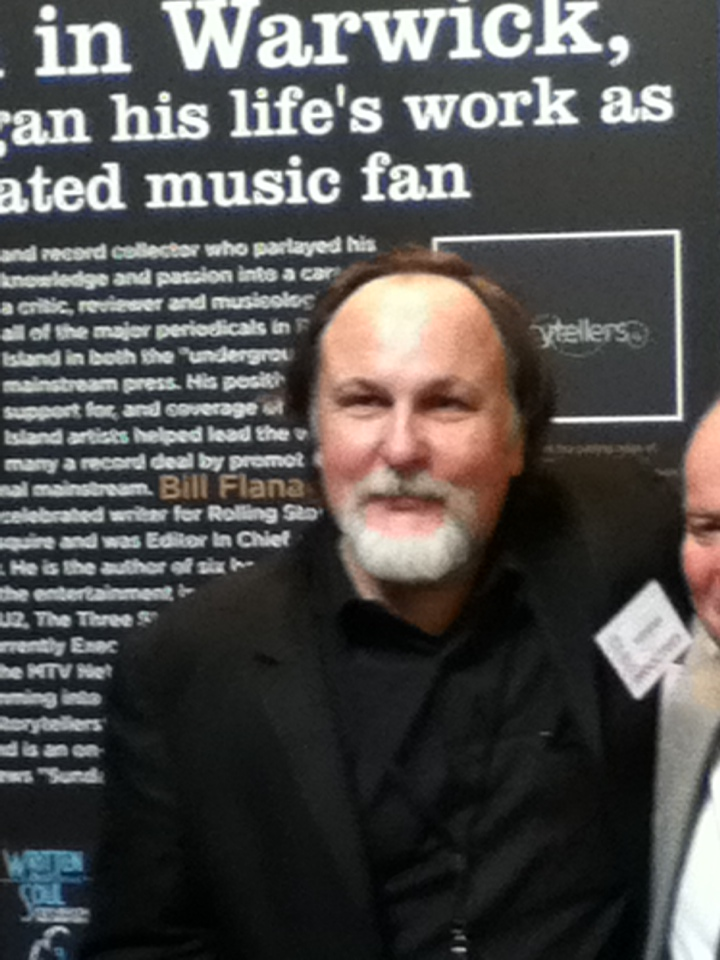
- Flanagan at the Rhode Island Music Hall of Fame
- Born: January 14, 1955 (age 71); Rhode Island, U.S.
- Education: Brown University
- Occupations: Author; radio host; television executive

Bill Flanagan (born January 14, 1955) is an American author, television executive and radio host. He was born in Rhode Island and graduated from Brown University in 1977. His books include Written in My Soul (1986), Last of the Moe Haircuts (1986), U2 at the End of the World (1995), and the novels A&R (2000), New Bedlam (2007), Evening's Empire (2010), and Fifty in Reverse (2020).

He is the screenwriter for the documentary Jimmy Carter: Rock n Roll President (August 2020) and produced Audible's best-seller Breakshot: James Taylor (2020) as well as Audible projects with St. Vincent: “St. Vincent: Words + Music” and Smokey Robinson (2020).

From 1995 until 2015 he was an executive at MTV Networks, retiring as Executive Vice President of the Viacom Music Group. As EVP/Editorial Director of MTV Networks, Flanagan oversaw the series VH1 Storytellers and CMT Crossroads. He has also worked on VH1's Legends, VH1 Archives, Hotel MTV, and many other series and specials. He was one of the producers of The Concert for New York City after the September 11 attacks and has produced, co-produced, or executive produced two televised concerts from the White House; The Beatles Revolution for ABC; Elvis Lives for NBC; and VH1 specials with Garth Brooks, Paul McCartney, Clint Eastwood, Bruce Springsteen, and Oprah Winfrey.

Flanagan currently hosts four series on Sirius XM Radio Channels - Flanagan's Wake on Tom Petty Radio, Written In My Soul on Volume, and The Fab Fourum and Northern Songs on the Beatles Channel.

Flanagan acts as Ombudsman of the Sundance Channel series Spectacle: Elvis Costello with.... He also appears on air as an essayist on CBS News Sunday Morning.

He has written for Rolling Stone, The New York Times, Esquire, Spy, Men's Journal, Vanity Fair, GQ, Commonweal, The New Yorker, and The Village Voice.
