= Somewhere Down the Crazy River =

- Standard international artwork

Single by Robbie Robertson

from the album Robbie Robertson
- Released: 1987
- Genre: Rock, spoken word
- Length: 4:57
- Label: Geffen
- Songwriter: Robbie Robertson
- Producers: Daniel Lanois; Robbie Robertson

Music video
- Robbie Robertson - Somewhere Down The Crazy River (Official Music Video) on YouTube

Alternative release
- Side A of Canadian single

"Somewhere Down the Crazy River" is a 1987 song by Robbie Robertson, initially released on Robertson's debut solo album Robbie Robertson, with Sam Llanas on backing vocals.

== Background ==
When one of the producers, Daniel Lanois, was asked about the inspiration for "Somewhere Down the Crazy River", he said that the song was "kind of like a guy with a deep voice telling you about steaming nights in Arkansas". He went on to say that Robertson was describing his experiences of hanging out in his old neighbourhood of Arkansas with Levon Helm (fellow The Band member) during hot nights in which they were "fishing with dynamite" and had asked a local for directions to "somewhere down the crazy river".

In terms of composition, the song features a "sweet and wonderful" chord sequence on the Suzuki Omnichord, which had been introduced to Lanois by Brian Eno. As Robertson developed the chord sequence, Lanois surreptitiously recorded him and superimposed his storytelling on top. Robertson said that he did not originally plan on recording the song with a spoken word delivery. Sam Llanas of the BoDeans was responsible for the response vocal.

In the United Kingdom, "Somewhere Down the Crazy River" was released by Geffen Records on June 27, 1988 with "Broken Arrow" as the B-side of all editions and the twelve-inch single featuring the song "Tailgate".

== Music video ==
Martin Scorsese directed a music video for the song, with Bob Jason and Amanda Temple handling the production through Limelight Films. The music video was filmed at Silvercup Studios in Queens. Steve Spears of the Tampa Bay Times said in his review that "things get pretty steamy near the end of the video for Robertson and [Maria] McKee as the two seem to take method acting seriously".

== Reception ==
The song was subject to mixed reviews by critics. Steve Simels of Stereo Review characterized the song as a "surreal, half-sung, half-spoken sketch of a late-night American landscape that jumbles New Orleans rhythm-and-blues and the Nigerian pop of Fela Anikulapo Kuti into as crazily evocative a piece of music as you're likely to hear this year"

Cash Box called it a "masterful cut" that "generates a powerful vision of steamy life in a more primitive phase, on a river from soul of Louisiana, or the Nile, or the mortal soul" and is "done with spoken word and a chant-like vocal and poetic lyrics that speak with a novelist's tongue and the heart of Huckleberry." Steve Spears of Tampa Bay Times called the song "sexy", whereas Mark Deming of AllMusic wrote that Robertson was "exploring the same iconography of the Band's best work, but without the same grace or subtle wit".

== Personnel ==
- Robbie Robertson – vocals, backing vocals, guitar
- Manu Katché – drums
- Bill Dillon – guitars
- Daniel Lanois – guitar, Omnichord
- Tony Levin – bass

Additional personnel

- Sammy Llanas – backing vocal

== Chart performance ==
"Somewhere Down the Crazy River" reached No. 15 on the UK Singles Chart, No. 24 on Billboard's Mainstream Rock Tracks and won Robertson and Lanois the Canadian Producer of the Year Award for 1989. In Robertson's home country Canada, it debuted at No. 95 on the week ending 2 April 1988 and then peaked at No. 91 for two weeks until the week ending 16 April 1988.

=== Weekly charts ===
Chart (1988)	Peak position
Australia (ARIA)	100
Belgium (Ultratop 50 Flanders)	8
Canada Top Singles (RPM)	91
Italy Airplay (Music & Media)	14
Netherlands (Dutch Top 40)	9
Netherlands (Single Top 100)	12
New Zealand (Recorded Music NZ)	40
UK Singles (Official Charts)	15
US Adult Contemporary (Billboard)	47
US Mainstream Rock (Billboard)	24

=== Year-end charts ===
Chart (1988)	Position
Netherlands (Dutch Top 40)	83
