= Robbie Robertson =

Canadian singer, songwriter and guitarist (1943–2023)

Robbie Robertson OC
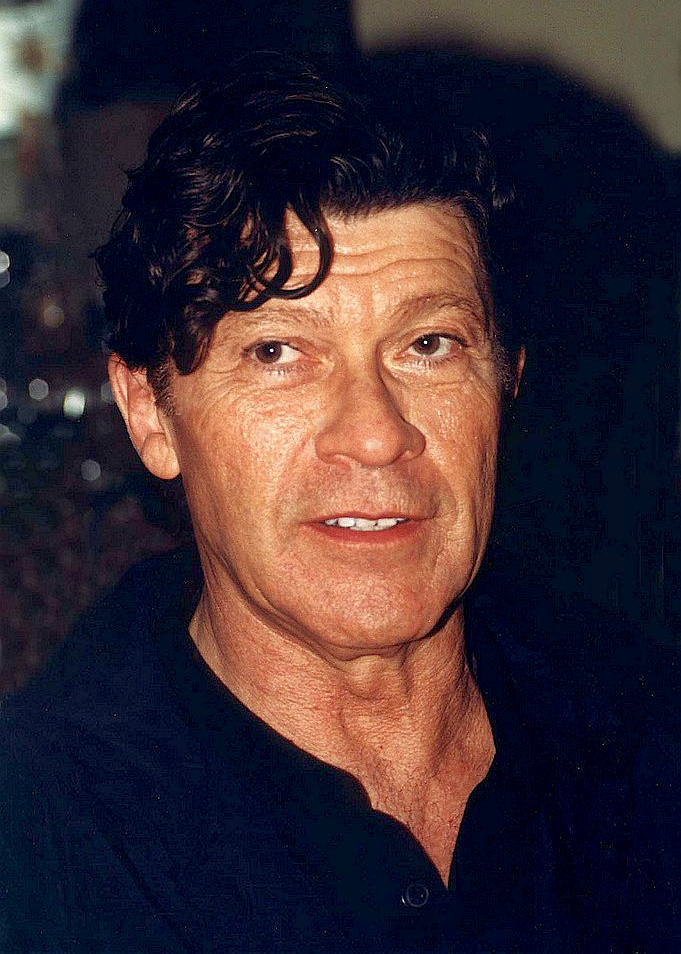
- Robertson in 2000
- Born: Jaime Royal Robertson; July 5, 1943; Toronto, Ontario, Canada
- Died: August 9, 2023 (aged 80); Los Angeles, California, U.S.
- Occupations: Musician; songwriter; singer; composer
- Years active: 1956–2023
- Spouses: Dominique Bourgeois (m. 1968; div. 2003); Janet Zuccarini (m. 2023)
- Children: 3, including Sebastian
- Musical career
- Genres: Rock; Americana; blues
- Instruments: Guitar; vocals
- Labels: Capitol; Geffen; Warner
- Formerly of: The Band

Jaime Royal "Robbie" Robertson OC (July 5, 1943 – August 9, 2023) was a Canadian musician, composer, and producer. Robertson was the onetime lead guitarist for Bob Dylan's backing band. He was also the guitarist and primary songwriter of the Band from its inception until his 1976 departure. In his later solo career, Robertson released six albums.

Robertson's work with the Band was instrumental in creating the Americana music genre. He was inducted into the Rock and Roll Hall of Fame and the Canadian Music Hall of Fame as a member of the Band; he was also inducted into Canada's Walk of Fame, both with the Band and on his own. Robertson is ranked 59th in Rolling Stone magazine's 2011 list of the 100 greatest guitarists of all time. He wrote "The Weight" and "The Night They Drove Old Dixie Down" with the Band and had a solo hit with "Somewhere Down the Crazy River". He was inducted into the Canadian Songwriters Hall of Fame and received a Lifetime Achievement Award from the National Academy of Songwriters.

Robertson collaborated on film and television soundtracks, usually with director Martin Scorsese. His soundtrack work began with The Band's farewell rockumentary film The Last Waltz (1978) and included dramatic films such as Raging Bull (1980), The King of Comedy (1983), The Color of Money (1986), The Irishman (2019), and Killers of the Flower Moon (2023), the last of which was dedicated to his memory and garnered him a posthumous nomination for the Academy Award for Best Original Score.

== Early life ==
Jaime Royal "Robbie" Robertson was born on July 5, 1943. His mother, Rosemarie Dolly Chrysler, was born on February 6, 1922. Chrysler was Cayuga and Mohawk, and was raised on the Six Nations of the Grand River reserve near Hamilton. Chrysler later lived with an aunt in the Cabbagetown neighbourhood of Toronto and worked at the Coro jewellery plating factory. She met James Patrick Robertson there and married him in 1942.

James and Rosemarie Robertson continued working at the Coro factory, and they lived in several Toronto neighbourhoods while Robbie Robertson was a child. An only child, Robbie Robertson often travelled with his mother to the Six Nations reserve to visit family. Here he was taught guitar, particularly by his older cousin Herb Myke. He became a fan of rock and roll and rhythm and blues through the radio, listening to disc jockey George "Hound Dog" Lorenz play rock on WKBW from Buffalo, New York, and staying up to listen to John R.'s all-night blues show on WLAC, a clear-channel station in Nashville, Tennessee.

When Robertson was 12 years old, as his mother was in the process of obtaining a divorce from James Robertson, she told him that his biological father was Alexander David Klegerman. Klegerman was a Jewish-American gambler with whom Robertson's mother had been involved before her marriage to James Robertson. Robertson wrote in his 2016 memoir, Testimony, that his mother told him that Klegerman had died in a hit-and-run accident on the Queen Elizabeth Way before Robbie Robertson was born. In fact, Klegerman was killed in June, 1946, shortly before Robertson turned three years old. (“1 killed, 6 Hurt In Motor Mishaps Over Week-End, The Globe and Mail, July 1, 1946). Robertson's mother later arranged for her son to meet his paternal uncles, Morris (Morrie) and Nathan (Natie) Klegerman. Robertson later stated that his uncles "quickly pulled me into their world and went out of their way to make me feel like family".

== Early career ==
When Robertson was 14, he worked two brief summer jobs in the travelling carnival circuit, first for a few days in a suburb of Toronto, and later as an assistant at a freak show for three weeks during the Canadian National Exhibition. He later drew from this experience for his song "Life is a Carnival" (with the Band) and the movie Carny (1980), which he both produced and starred in.

The first band Robertson joined was Little Caesar and the Consuls, formed in 1956 by pianist/vocalist Bruce Morshead and guitarist Gene MacLellan. He stayed with the group for almost a year, playing popular songs of the day at local teen dances. In 1957, he formed Robbie and the Rhythm Chords with his friend Pete "Thumper" Traynor (who later founded Traynor Amplifiers). They changed their name to Robbie and the Robots after they watched the film Forbidden Planet and took a liking to the film's character Robby the Robot. Traynor customized Robertson's guitar for the Robots, fitting it with antennae and wires to give it a space age look. Traynor and Robertson joined with pianist Scott Cushnie and became The Suedes. At a Suedes show on October 5, 1959, when they played CHUM Radio's Hif Fi Club on Toronto's Merton Street, Ronnie Hawkins first became aware of them and was impressed enough to join them for a few numbers.

=== With Ronnie Hawkins and the Hawks ===
Robertson began shadowing Hawkins after the Suedes opened for the Arkansas-based rockabilly group Ronnie Hawkins and the Hawks at Dixie Arena. One afternoon he overheard Hawkins say he needed some new songs since they were going into the studio to record the next month. Hoping to ingratiate himself, Robertson stayed up all night and wrote two songs, "Someone Like You" and "Hey Boba Lu", and played them for Hawkins the next day. The showman was impressed and recorded both of them for his new album, Mr Dynamo (1959). Hawkins brought Robertson to the Brill Building in New York City to help him choose songs for the rest of the album.

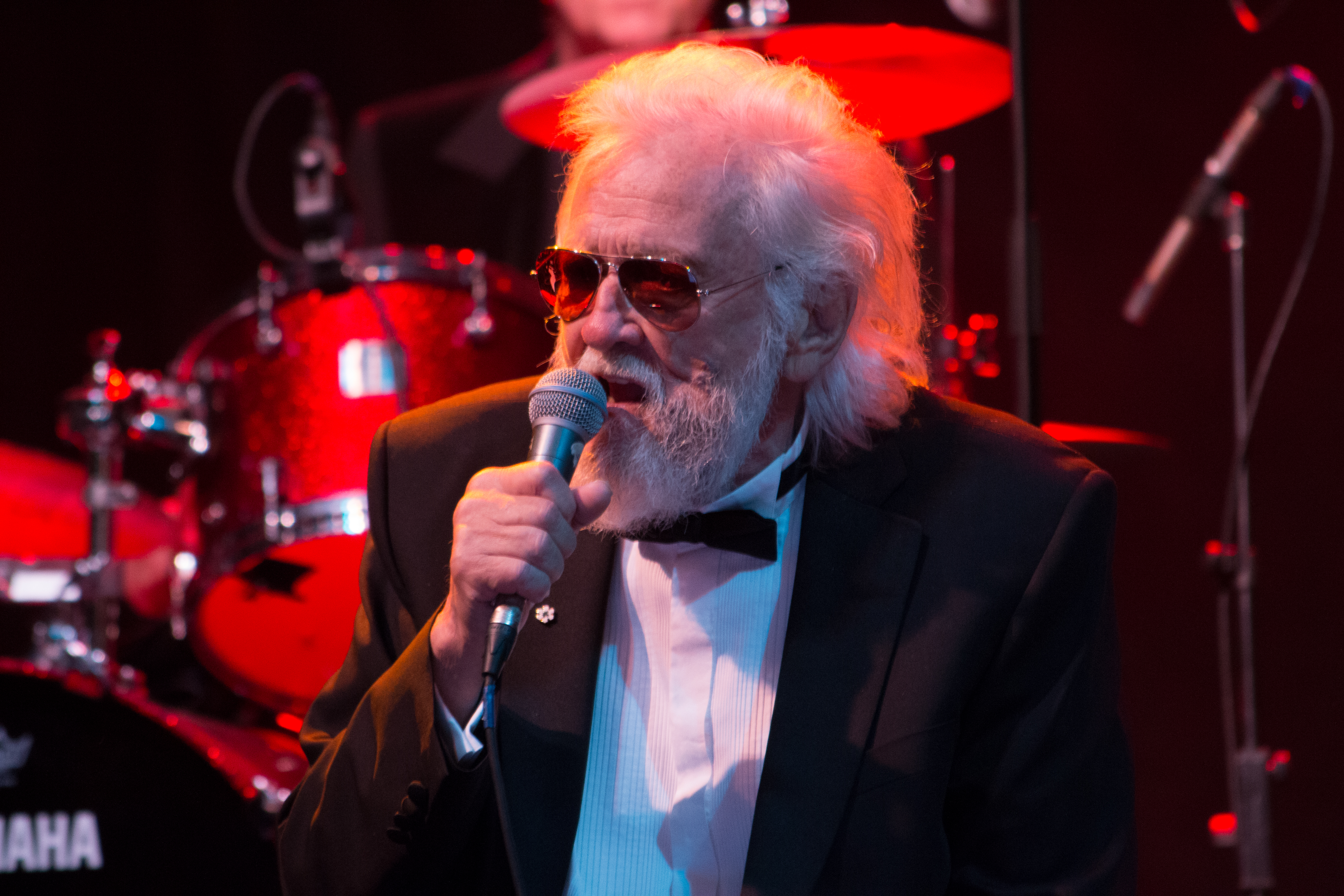
Ronnie Hawkins (here pictured performing in 2014) hired Robertson as a member of his backup band the Hawks in 1960.

Hawkins hired pianist Scott Cushnie away from the Suedes and took him on tour in Arkansas with the Hawks. When the Hawks' bass player left the group, Cushnie recommended that Hawkins hire Robertson to replace him on bass. Hawkins invited Robertson to Arkansas, and then flew to the UK to perform on television there. Left in Arkansas, Robertson spent his living allowance on records and practised intensively each day. Upon returning, Hawkins hired him to play bass. Cushnie left the band a few months later. Robertson soon switched from bass to playing lead guitar for the Hawks. He developed into a guitar virtuoso.

Roy Buchanan, a few years older than Robertson, was briefly a member of the Hawks and became an important influence on Robertson's guitar style: "Standing next to Buchanan on stage for several months, Robertson was able to absorb Buchanan's deft manipulations with his volume speed dial, his tendency to bend multiple strings for steel guitar-like effect, his rapid sweep picking, and his passion for bending past the root and fifth notes during solo flights."

Drummer/singer Levon Helm was already a member of the Hawks and soon became close friends with Robertson. The Hawks continued to tour the United States and Canada, adding Rick Danko, Richard Manuel, and Garth Hudson to the Hawks lineup in 1961. This lineup, which later became the Band, toured with Hawkins throughout 1962 and into 1963. They also hired the saxophone player Jerry Penfound and later Bruce Bruno, who were both with the group in their intermediary period as Levon and the Hawks.

Ronnie Hawkins and the Hawks cut sessions for Roulette Records throughout 1961–1963, all of which Robertson appeared on. The sessions included three singles: "Come Love" b/w "I Feel Good" (Roulette 4400 1961); "Who Do You Love" b/w "Bo Diddley" (Roulette 4483 1963); and "There's A Screw Loose" b/w "High Blood Pressure" (Roulette 4502 1963).

=== With Levon and the Hawks ===
The Hawks left Ronnie Hawkins at the beginning of 1964 to go on their own. The members of the Hawks were losing interest in playing in the rockabilly style and favoured blues and soul music. In early 1964, the group approached agent Harold Kudlets about representing them, which he agreed to do, booking them a year's worth of shows in the same circuits as they had been in before with Ronnie Hawkins. Originally dubbed The Levon Helm Sextet, the group included all of the future members of the Band as well as Jerry Penfound on saxophone and Bob Bruno on vocals.

After Bruno left the group in May 1964, the group changed their name to Levon and the Hawks. Penfound stayed with the group until 1965. Kudlets kept the group busy performing throughout 1964 and into 1965, finally booking them into two lengthy summer engagements at the popular nightclub Tony Mart's in Somers Point, New Jersey, at the Shore. They played six nights a week alongside Conway Twitty and other acts.

The members of Levon and the Hawks befriended blues artist John P. Hammond while he was performing in Toronto in 1964. Later in the year, the group agreed to work on Hammond's album So Many Roads (released in 1965) at the same time that they were playing the Peppermint Lounge in New York City. Robertson played guitar throughout the album, and was billed "Jaime R. Robertson" in the album's credits.

Levon and the Hawks cut the single "Uh Uh Uh" b/w "Leave Me Alone" under the name the Canadian Squires in March 1965. Both songs were written by Robertson. The single was recorded in New York and released on Apex Records in the United States and on Ware Records in Canada. As Levon and the Hawks, the group cut an afternoon session for Atco Records later in 1965, which yielded two singles, "The Stones I Throw" b/w "He Don't Love You" (Atco 6383) and "Go, Go, Liza Jane" b/w "He Don't Love You" (Atco 6625). Robertson also wrote all three of the tracks on Levon and the Hawks' Atco singles.

=== With Bob Dylan and the Hawks ===
==== 1965–1966 World Tour ====
Toward the end of Levon and the Hawks' second engagement at Tony Mart's in New Jersey, in August 1965, Robertson received a call from Albert Grossman Management requesting a meeting with singer Bob Dylan. The group had been recommended to both Grossman and to Dylan by Mary Martin, one of Grossman's employees; she was originally from Toronto and was a friend of the band. Dylan was also aware of the group through his friend John Hammond, whose album So Many Roads members of the Hawks had performed on.

Robertson agreed to meet with Dylan. Initially, Dylan intended simply to hire Robertson as the guitarist for his backing group. Robertson refused the offer, but did agree to play two shows with Dylan, one at the Forest Hills Tennis Stadium in Forest Hills, New York, on August 28, and one at the Hollywood Bowl in Los Angeles on September 3. Robertson suggested they use Levon Helm on drums for the shows.

Robertson and Helm performed in Dylan's backing band, along with Harvey Brooks and Al Kooper for both shows. The first at Forest Hills received a predominantly hostile response, but the second in Los Angeles was received slightly more favourably. Dylan flew up to Toronto and rehearsed with Levon and the Hawks September 15–17, as Levon and the Hawks finished an engagement there, and hired the full band for his upcoming tour. Robertson thus became Dylan's guitarist as Dylan entered his "legendary electric period".

Dylan and the Hawks toured the United States throughout October–December 1965, with each show consisting of two sets: an acoustic show featuring only Dylan on guitar and harmonica, and an electric set featuring Dylan backed by the Hawks. The tours were largely met with a hostile reaction from fans who knew Dylan as a prominent figure in the American folk music revival, and thought his move into rock music a betrayal. Helm left the group after their November 28 performance in Washington, D.C.

On November 30, 1965, Dylan cut a studio session with members of the Hawks, which yielded the non-LP single "Can You Please Crawl Out Your Window?" Dylan completed the Blonde on Blonde album in Nashville in mid-February 1966, employing Robertson for one of these sessions, which took place on February 14.

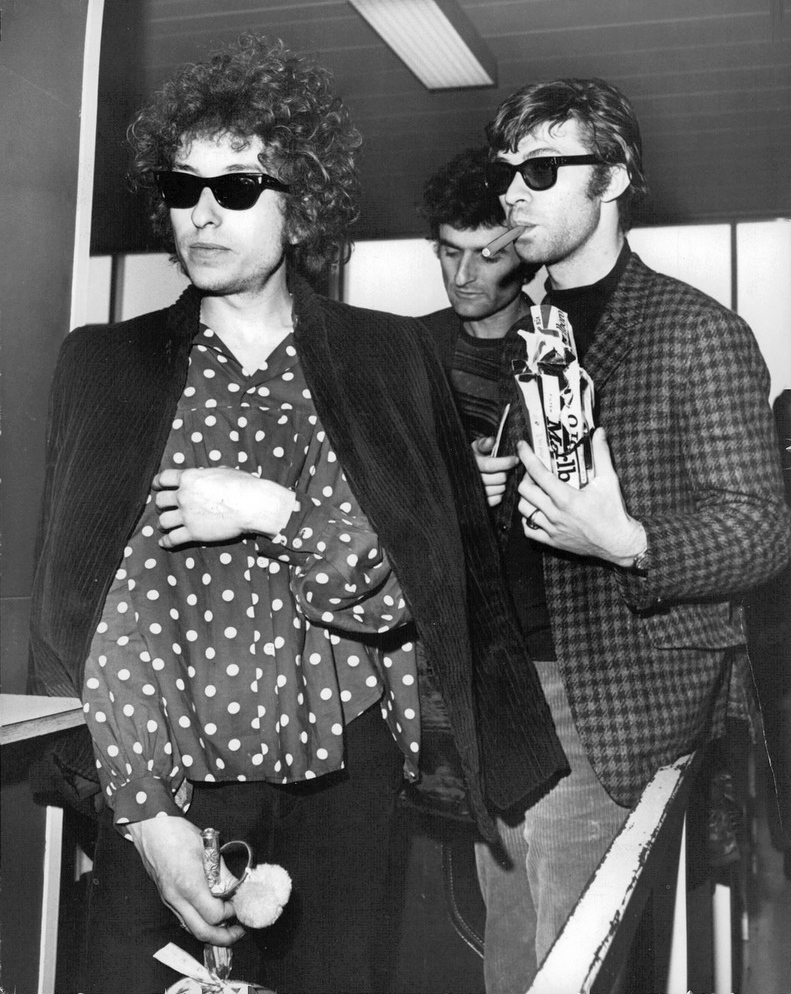
Robertson (right) with Bob Dylan in 1966.

Dylan and the Hawks played more dates in the continental United States from February to March 1966 of Bob Dylan's 1966 World Tour. From April 9–May 27, they played Hawaii, Australia, Europe, and the UK and Ireland. The Australian and European legs of the tour received a particularly harsh response from disgruntled folk fans. The May 17 Manchester Free Trade Hall show is best known for an angry audience member audibly yelling "Judas!" at Dylan; it became a frequently-bootlegged live show from the tour, but was eventually released officially as The Bootleg Series Vol. 4: Bob Dylan Live 1966, The "Royal Albert Hall" Concert.

==== "Basement Tapes" period ====
On July 29, 1966, Dylan sustained an injured neck from a motorcycle accident, and retreated to a quiet domestic life with his new wife and child in upstate New York. Some of the members of the Hawks were living at the Chelsea Hotel in New York City at the time, and were kept on a weekly retainer by Dylan's management.

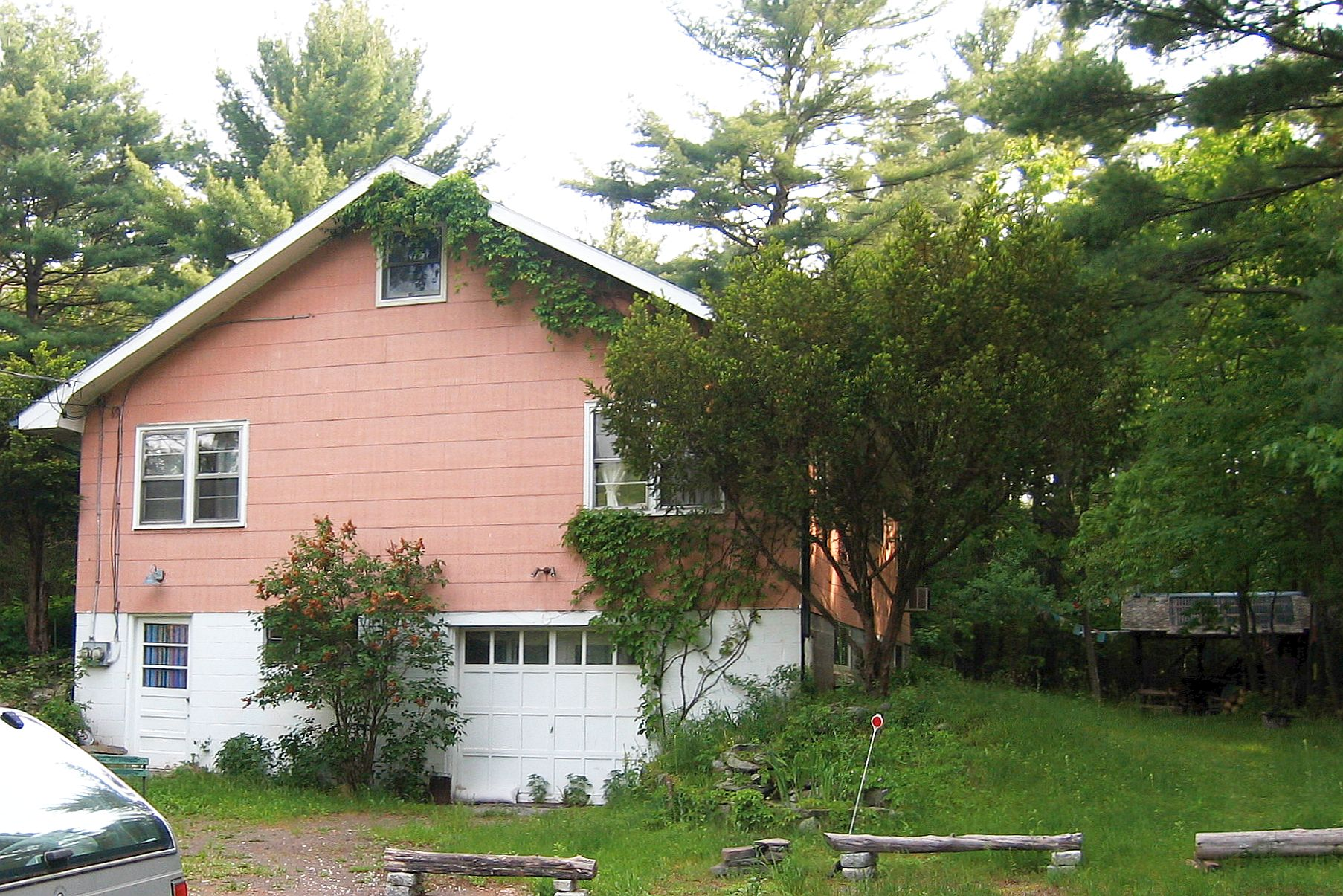
The "Big Pink" house in 2006. "Big Pink" was the house where Bob Dylan and the Band's Basement Tapes were recorded, and the music from the Band album Music From Big Pink was written.

In February 1967, Dylan invited the members of the Hawks to come up to Woodstock, New York to work on music. Robertson had met a French-Canadian woman on the Paris stop of Dylan's 1966 world tour, and the two moved into a house in the Woodstock area. The remaining three members of the Hawks rented a house near West Saugerties, New York; it was later dubbed "Big Pink" because of its pink exterior.

Dylan and the members of the Hawks worked together at the Big Pink house every day to rehearse and generate ideas for new songs, many of which they recorded in Big Pink's makeshift basement studio. The recordings were made between the late spring and autumn of 1967. Previous Hawks member Levon Helm returned to the group in August 1967. By this time, Robertson's guitar style had evolved to be more supportive of the songs and less devoted to displaying speed and virtuosity.

In time, word about these sessions began to circulate, and in 1968, Rolling Stone magazine co-founder Jann Wenner brought attention to these tracks in an article entitled "Dylan's Basement Tape Should Be Released".

In 1969, a bootleg album with a plain white cover compiled by two incognito music industry insiders featured a collection of seven tracks from these sessions. The album, which became known as The Great White Wonder, began to appear in independent record stores and receive radio airplay. This album became a runaway success and helped to launch the bootleg recording industry.

In 1975, Robertson produced an official compilation, The Basement Tapes, which included a selection of tracks from the sessions. An exhaustive collection of all 138 extant recordings was released in 2014 as The Bootleg Series Vol. 11: The Basement Tapes Complete.

== The Band ==
=== 1967–1968: Music from Big Pink ===
In late 1967, Dylan left to record his next album, John Wesley Harding (1967). After recording the basic tracks, Dylan asked Robertson and Garth Hudson about playing on the album to fill out the sound. Robertson liked the starkness of the sound and recommended Dylan leave the tracks as they were. Dylan worked with the Hawks again when they were his backup band for two Woody Guthrie memorial concerts at Carnegie Hall in New York City in January 1968. Three of these performances were later released by Columbia Records on the LP A Tribute to Woody Guthrie, Vol. 1 (1972).

Over the course of the "Basement Tapes" period, the group had developed a sound of their own. Grossman went to Los Angeles to shop the group to a major label, securing a contract with Capitol Records. The group went to New York to begin recording songs with music producer John Simon. Capitol brought the group to Los Angeles to finish the album. The resulting album, Music from Big Pink, was released in August 1968. The group called itself The Band, and Music from Big Pink was its debut studio album.

Robertson was the principal songwriter and lead guitarist of the Band. He wrote four of the songs on Music From Big Pink, including "The Weight", "Chest Fever", "Caledonia Mission", and "To Kingdom Come". He is listed in the songwriting credits as "J.R. Robertson". He sang lead vocals on the track "To Kingdom Come"; he did not sing on another Band song released to the public until "Knockin' Lost John" on 1977's Islands. Two of Robertson's compositions for the album, "The Weight" and "Chest Fever", became important touchstones in the group's career. "The Weight" was influenced by the films of director Luis Buñuel, in particular Nazarín (1959) and Viridiana (1961), and reflects the recurring theme in Buñuel's films about the impossibility of sainthood. The song portrays an individual who attempts to take a saintly pilgrimage and becomes mired in requests from other people to do favors for them along the way. The mention of "Nazareth" at the beginning of the song refers to Nazareth, Pennsylvania, where the C. F. Martin & Company guitar manufacturer is located; it was inspired by Robertson seeing the word "Nazareth" in the hole of his Martin guitar.

Although "The Weight" reached No. 21 on the British radio charts, it did not fare as well on the American charts, initially stalling at No. 63. Nevertheless, "The Weight" has since become the Band's best known song. It has been covered by many artists, appeared in dozens of films and documentaries, and has become a staple of American rock music.

=== 1969–1973: Expansion and acclaim ===
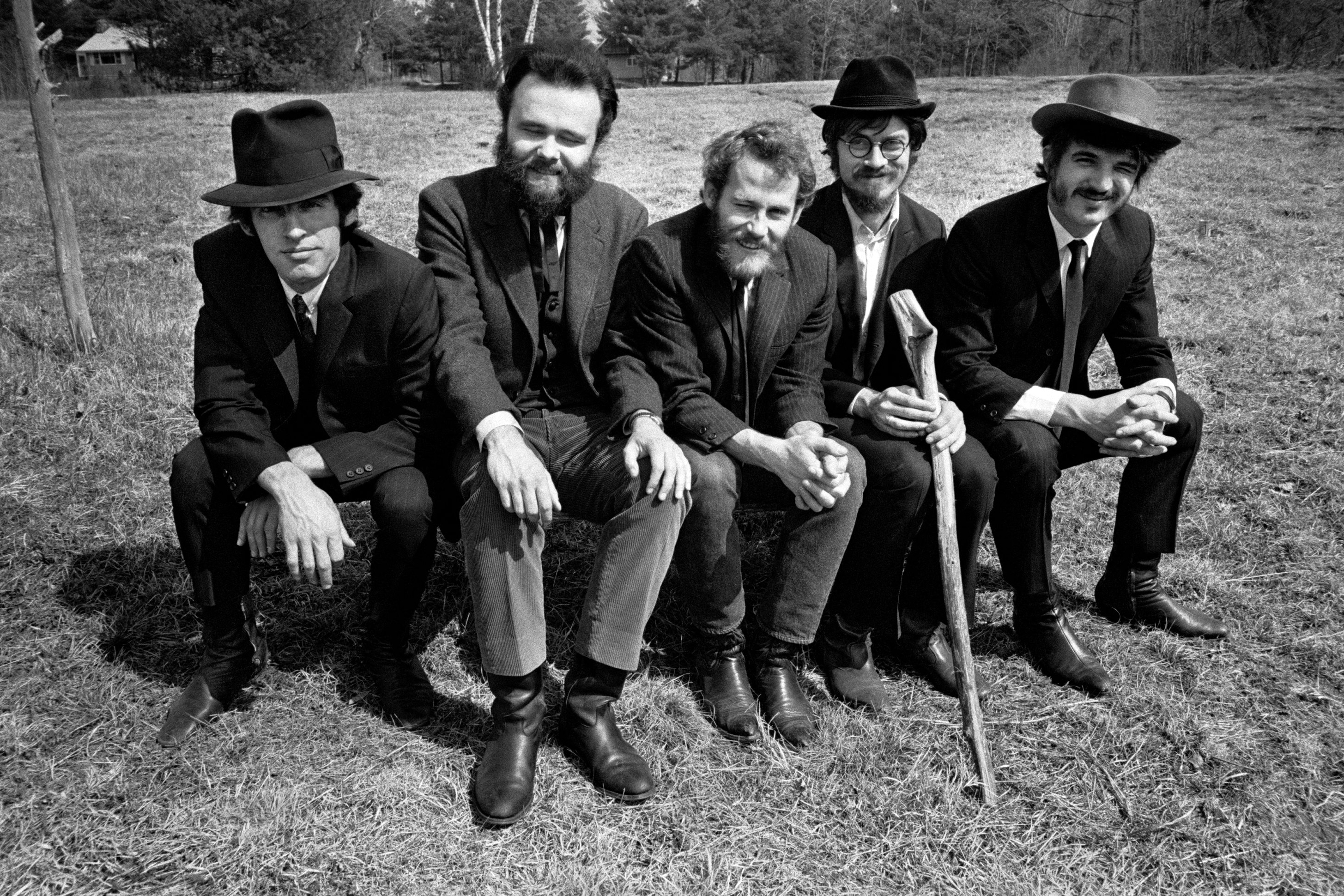
The Band in 1969. Robertson is second from the right.

The Band began performing regularly in spring 1969, with their first live dates as the Band taking place at the Winterland Ballroom in San Francisco. Their most notable performances that year were at the 1969 Woodstock Festival and the UK Isle of Wight Festival with Bob Dylan in August.

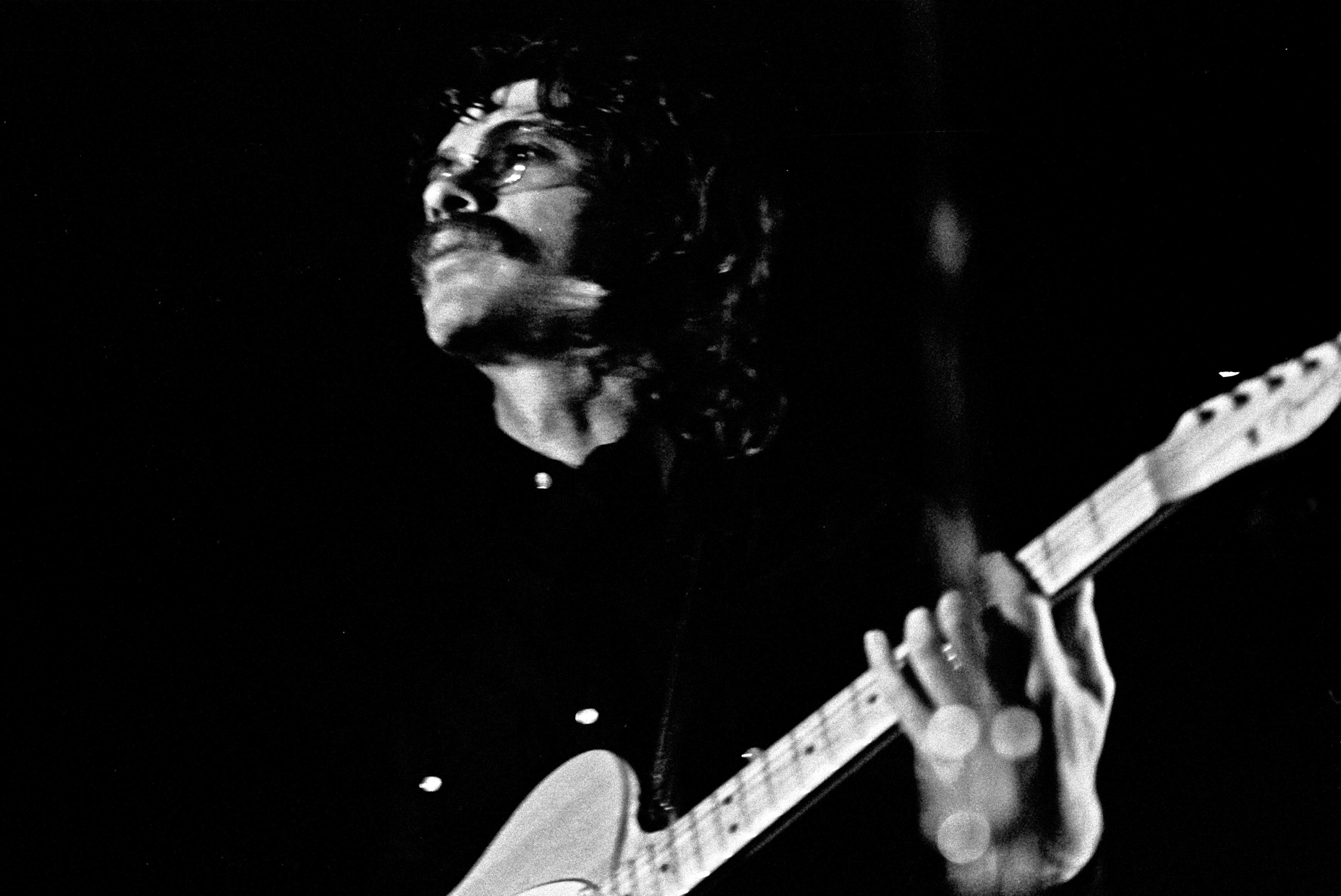
Robertson performing in 1971

The Band's self-titled second album was released in September 1969. It became a critical and commercial success. The album received almost universal critical praise, peaked at No. 9 on the U.S. pop charts, and stayed on the Top 40 for 24 weeks. Robertson wrote or co-wrote each song on the album. The Band works as a loose concept album of Americana themes, and was instrumental in the creation of the Americana music genre. It was included in the Library of Congress' National Recording Registry in 2009.

The song from The Band that had the strongest cultural influence was "The Night They Drove Old Dixie Down". The song was written by Robertson, who spent about eight months working on it. The lyrics tell of the last days of the American Civil War, portraying the suffering of the protagonist, Virgil Caine, a poor white Southerner. Robertson said he had the music to the song in his head and would play the chords over and over on the piano but had no idea what the song was to be about. Later, the concept came to him and he researched the subject with help from Helm, a native of Arkansas. Although the Band's original version of the song was only released as the B side of the single "Up on Cripple Creek", a cover version by Joan Baez went to No. 3 on the charts in 1971 and helped to popularize the song. The song was number 245 on Rolling Stone magazine's 2004 list of the 500 greatest songs of all time. Pitchfork Media named it the forty-second best song of the 1960s. The song is included in the Rock and Roll Hall of Fame's "500 Songs that Shaped Rock and Roll" and Time magazine's All-Time 100.

On November 2, 1969, the Band appeared on the Ed Sullivan Show, one of only two television appearances they made. On January 12, 1970, the Band was featured on the cover of Time magazine. The Band rented The Woodstock Playhouse in Woodstock, New York with the intent of recording a new live album there, but the city council voted against it, so they recorded on location, but without an audience. Robertson handled most of the songwriting duties as before. Robertson brought in Todd Rundgren to engineer the album which was recorded in two weeks' time. These sessions resulted in the Band's third album, Stage Fright. Stage Fright became the Band's highest-charting album, peaking at No. 5 on September 5 and staying on the Billboard Top 40 for 14 weeks.

The Band's next album, Cahoots, was recorded at Albert Grossman's newly built Bearsville Studios and was released in October 1971. The album received mixed reviews and peaked at No. 24 on the Billboard charts, only remaining on the Billboard Top 40 for five weeks. Cahoots is notable for its cover of Bob Dylan's "When I Paint My Masterpiece", as well as for featuring the concert favourite "Life Is a Carnival". The inclusion of "When I Paint My Masterpiece" came about when Dylan stopped by Robertson's home during the recording of Cahoots and Robertson asked if he might have any songs to contribute. That led to Dylan playing an unfinished version of "When I Paint My Masterpiece" for him. Dylan soon completed the song and the Band recorded it for the album.

The Band continued to tour throughout 1970–1971. A live album recorded at a series of shows at the Academy of Music in New York City between December 28–31, 1971 was released in 1972 as the double album Rock Of Ages. Rock of Ages peaked at No. 6, and remained in the Top 40 for 14 weeks.

After the Academy of Music shows, the Band again retreated from performing live. They returned to the stage on July 28, 1973, to play the Summer Jam at Watkins Glen alongside the Allman Brothers Band and the Grateful Dead. A recording of the Band's performance was released by Capitol Records as the album Live at Watkins Glen in 1995. With over 600,000 people in attendance, the festival set a record for "Pop Festival Attendance" in the Guinness Book of World Records. The record was first published in the 1976 edition of the book.

In October 1973, the Band released an album of cover songs entitled Moondog Matinee, which peaked at No. 28 on the Billboard charts. Around the time of the recording of Moondog Matinee, Robertson began working on an ambitious project entitled Works that was never finished or released. One lyric from the Works project, "Lay a flower in the snow", was used in Robertson's song "Fallen Angel", which appeared on his 1987 self-titled solo album.

=== 1974: Reunion with Bob Dylan ===
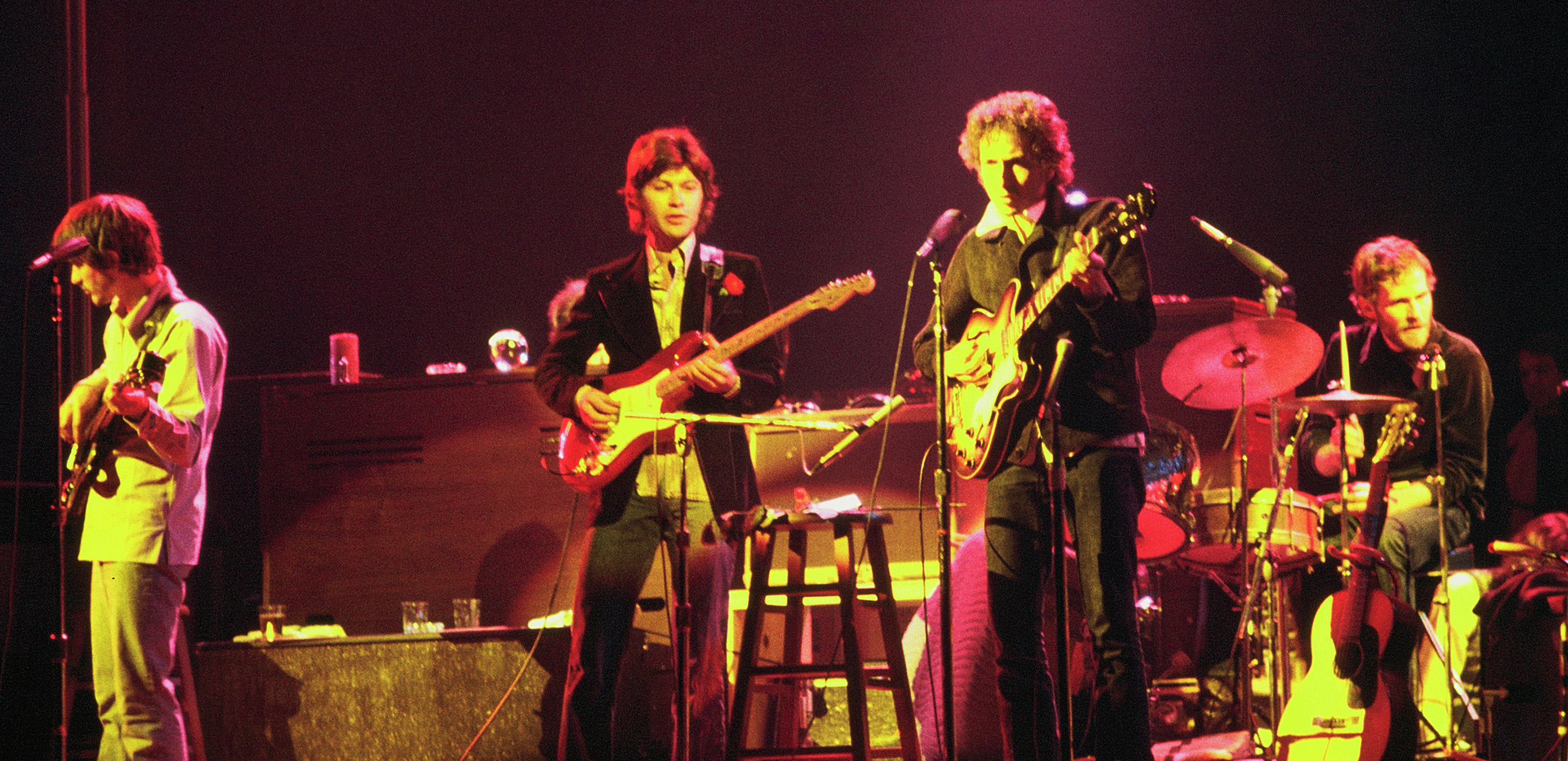
Bob Dylan and the Band performing at the Chicago Stadium in Chicago, Illinois, on the 1974 reunion tour, Robertson is second from the left

Bill Graham took out a full-page advertisement in The New York Times to spread the word that Bob Dylan and the Band were going on tour in 1974. The response was one of the largest in entertainment history up to that point, with between five and six million requests for tickets mailed in for 650,000 seats. Graham's office ended up selling tickets off on a lottery basis, and Dylan and the Band netted $2 million from the deal.

While preparing for the tour, the Band went into the studio with Dylan to record a new album for Asylum Records, Planet Waves (1974). Sessions took place at Village Recorder in West Los Angeles, California, from November 2–14, 1973. Planet Waves was released on February 9, 1974. The album was No. 1 on the Billboard album charts for four weeks, and spent 12 weeks total in the Billboard Top 40. Planet Waves was Bob Dylan's first No. 1 album; it was also the first and only studio album that Dylan and the Band recorded together.

The 1974 tour began at the Chicago Stadium on January 3, 1974 and ended at The Forum in Inglewood, California on February 14. The final three shows of the tour at The Forum in Inglewood, California were recorded and assembled into the double album Before the Flood. Credited to "Bob Dylan/The Band", Before the Flood was released by Asylum Records on July 20, 1974. The album debuted at No. 3 on the Billboard charts, and spent ten weeks in the Top Forty.

=== 1974–1975: Shangri-La Studios ===
Following the 1974 reunion tour with Bob Dylan, rock manager Elliot Roberts booked the Band with the recently reunited Crosby, Stills, Nash, and Young. On September 4, both artists played Wembley Stadium in London, appearing with Jesse Colin Young and Joni Mitchell.

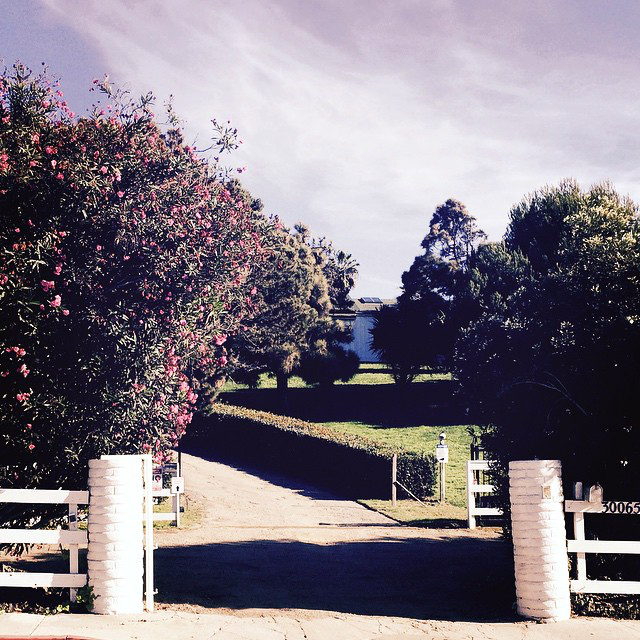
The entrance to Shangri-La Studios in 2016. The Band had the ranch house on the Shangri-La property converted into a recording studio in 1974.

After moving to Malibu in 1973, Robertson and the Band had discovered a ranch in Malibu near Zuma Beach called "Shangri-La" and decided to lease the property. The album release of The Basement Tapes (1975), credited to Bob Dylan and the Band, was the first album production that took place in the new studio at Shangri-La. The album, produced by Robertson, featured a selection of tapes from the original 1967 Basement Tapes sessions with Dylan, as well as demos for tracks eventually recorded for the Music From Big Pink album. Robertson cleaned up the tracks, and the album was released in July 1975.

One of the best-known tracks on the Band's next album, Northern Lights – Southern Cross (1975), is "Acadian Driftwood", the Band's first song with specifically Canadian subject matter. Robertson was inspired to write "Acadian Driftwood" after seeing the 1971 documentary Acadia, Acadia (L'Acadie, L'Acadie?!?) on Canadian television while in Montreal. Northern Lights – Southern Cross was released on November 1, 1975. The album received generally positive reviews, and reached No. 26 on the Billboard charts, remaining on the Top 40 for five weeks.

=== 1976–1978: The Last Waltz ===
The Band began touring again in June 1976, performing throughout the summer. The members of the Band were splintering off to work on other projects, with Levon Helm building a studio in Woodstock and Rick Danko having been contracted to Arista Records as a solo artist. While on the summer tour, member Richard Manuel severely injured his neck in a boating accident, so ten dates were cancelled.

During this time, Robertson suggested the Band cease to tour. He said they agreed to perform a "grand finale" show, part ways to work on their various projects, and then regroup. Helm later made the case in his autobiography, This Wheel's on Fire, that Robertson had forced the Band's breakup on the rest of the group. For his part, Robertson later stated that concerns about heroin use by Danko, Helm, and Manuel led him to take control of the Band and led to his departure from the Band.

Concert promoter Bill Graham booked the Band at the Winterland Ballroom on American Thanksgiving, November 25, 1976. The Last Waltz was a gala event, with ticket prices of $25 per person. It included a Thanksgiving dinner served to the audience, and featured the Band performing with various musical guests.

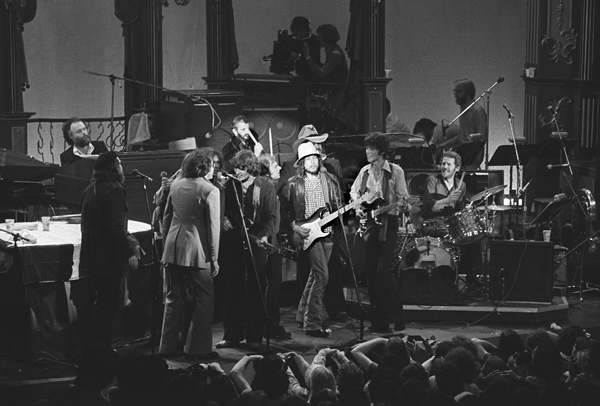
The Band with musical guests performing "I Shall Be Released" at The Last Waltz concert on November 25, 1976

Robertson wanted to document the event on film and approached director Martin Scorsese to see if he was interested in shooting the concert. Robertson and Scorsese developed a 200-page script for the show.

Rehearsals for The Last Waltz concert began in early November. Warner Bros. Records president Mo Ostin offered to fund its filming in exchange for the right to release its music on an album. The Band were contractually obligated to supply Capitol Records with one more album before they could be released to work with Warner Bros. In between rehearsals for The Last Waltz, they worked on the studio album Islands for Capitol. Robertson wrote or co-wrote eight of the ten tracks. One of the songs, "Knockin' Lost John", features Robertson on vocals; it was the first Band song Robertson had sung on since "To Kingdom Come" from Music From Big Pink. "Christmas Must Be Tonight" was inspired by the birth of Robertson's son, Sebastian, in July 1974.

Approximately 5,000 people attended The Last Waltz. After the concert event was finished, Scorsese had 400 reels of raw footage to work with. The Last Waltz album was released by Warner Brothers Records on April 7, 1978, as a 3-LP set. The first five sides feature live performances from the concert, and the last side contains studio recordings from the MGM sound stage sessions, including Out of the Blue, which would be released as a single and which is the third and last Band song on which Robertson sang lead. The album peaked at No. 16 on the Billboard charts, and remained in the Top 40 for 8 weeks.

The Last Waltz was released to movie theatres on April 26, 1978. The film fared well with both rock and film critics. Robertson and Scorsese made appearances throughout America and Europe to promote the film.Over time, The Last Waltz has become lauded by many as an important and pioneering rockumentary. Its influence has been felt on subsequent rock music films such as Talking Heads' Stop Making Sense (1984), and U2's Rattle and Hum (1988).

In his mixed review, Roger Ebert wrote, "In The Last Waltz, we have musicians who seem to have bad memories. Who are hanging on. Scorsese's direction is mostly limited to closeups and medium shots of performances; he ignores the audience. The movie was made at the end of a difficult period in his own life, and at a particularly hard time (the filming coincided with his work on New York, New York). This is not a record of serene men, filled with nostalgia, happy to be among friends."

Robertson left the band in 1976, but performed with them one final time on March 1, 1978 at the Roxy in Los Angeles.

=== Copyright controversy ===
Robertson is credited as writer or co-writer of the majority of The Band's songs and, as a result, has received most of the songwriting royalties generated from the music. That developed into a point of contention, especially for Helm. In his 1993 autobiography, This Wheel's on Fire: Levon Helm and the Story of The Band, Helm disputed the validity of the songwriting credits as listed on the albums and explained that The Band's songs were developed in collaboration with all members. Danko concurred with Helm: "I think Levon's book hits the nail on the head about where Robbie and Albert Grossman and some of those people went wrong and when The Band stopped being The Band... I'm truly friends with everybody but, hey—it could happen to Levon, too. When people take themselves too seriously and believe too much in their own bullshit, they usually get in trouble." Robertson denied that Helm had written any of the songs attributed to Robertson.

== Session work and production work ==
Robertson produced Jesse Winchester's debut self-titled album, which was released in 1970 on Ampex Records. The album features Robertson playing guitar throughout the album, and co-credits the track "Snow" to Robertson as well.

Robertson played guitar on ex-Beatle Ringo Starr's third solo album, Ringo (1973), performing with four-fifths of the Band on the track "Sunshine Life For Me (Sail Away Raymond)". Robertson contributed a guitar solo on the track "Snookeroo" on Starr's fourth album, Goodnight Vienna (1974).

Robertson played guitar for Joni Mitchell on the track "Raised on Robbery", which was released on her album Court and Spark. In 1974, Robertson also played guitar on Carly Simon's version of "Mockingbird", which featured Simon singing with her then-husband James Taylor.

In 1975, Robertson produced and played guitar on singer/guitarist Hirth Martinez's debut album Hirth From Earth. Bob Dylan had heard Martinez, and recommended him to Robertson. Robertson identified strongly with Martinez' music, helped him to secure a recording contract with Warner Bros. Records, and agreed to produce Martinez' debut album. He also played guitar on Martinez' follow-up album, Big Bright Street (1977).

In 1975, Eric Clapton recorded the album No Reason to Cry at the Band's Shangri-La Studios with help from members of the Band. Robertson played lead guitar on the track "Sign Language".

In the mid-1970s, Robertson connected with singer Neil Diamond, and the two began collaborating on a concept album about the life and struggles of a Tin Pan Alley songwriter. The resulting album, entitled Beautiful Noise, was recorded at Shangri-La Studios in early 1976. It reached No. 6 on the Billboard charts and remained in the Top 40 for sixteen weeks. Robertson produced the album, co-wrote the track "Dry Your Eyes" with Diamond (which he would go on to perform at The Last Waltz), and played guitar on "Dry Your Eyes", "Lady-Oh", and "Jungletime". He produced Diamond's live double album Love at the Greek (1977), which was recorded in 1976 at the Greek Theatre in Los Angeles. Love at the Greek reached No. 8 on the Billboard charts and remained in the Top 40 for nine weeks.

In 1977, Robertson contributed to two album projects from the Band alumni. Robertson played guitar on "Java Blues" on Rick Danko's self-titled debut album, and also played guitar on the Earl King-penned "Sing, Sing, Sing" on the album Levon Helm & the RCO All-Stars.

Also in 1977, Robertson contributed to the second self-titled album by singer-songwriter Libby Titus, who was the former girlfriend of Levon Helm. Robertson produced the track "The Night You Took Me To Barbados In My Dreams" (co-written by Titus and Hirth Martinez), and produced and played guitar on the Cole Porter standard "Miss Otis Regrets".

Robertson co-produced the track "The Best of Everything", which was originally intended for the film The King of Comedy but instead was included on the Tom Petty and the Heartbreakers album Southern Accents. Robertson also worked on the horn arrangements for the track, and brought in Band alumni Richard Manuel and Garth Hudson as guests.

In 1986, Robertson appeared as a guest on the album Reconciled by the Call, playing guitar on the track "The Morning".

Also in 1986, Robertson was brought on as creative consultant for Hail! Hail! Rock 'n' Roll (1987), a feature film saluting Chuck Berry. Robertson appears on camera, interviewing Chuck Berry, and then playing guitar while Berry recites poetry.

In 1988, Robertson collaborated as a songwriter with Lone Justice lead singer Maria McKee. One of the songs they co-wrote, "Nobody's Child", was released on McKee's self-titled debut album in 1989.

In 1992, Robertson produced the song "Love in Time" for Roy Orbison's posthumous album King of Hearts. "Love In Time" was a basic demo Orbison had recorded that was believed to be lost, but had just recently been rediscovered. Robertson set about augmenting Orbison's basic vocal track with new arrangements and instrumentation, with the intent of making it sound like the arrangements were there from the beginning instead of later additions.

== Solo career ==
=== Robbie Robertson (1987) ===
Robertson began work on his first solo album, Robbie Robertson, in July 1986 after signing with Geffen Records. Robertson chose fellow Canadian Daniel Lanois to produce the album. The album was recorded at The Village Recorder in West Los Angeles, California; at Bearsville Studios near Woodstock, New York; in Dublin, Ireland, with U2; and in Bath, England, with Peter Gabriel. Robertson employed a number of guest artists on the album, including U2, Gabriel, Bodeans, and Maria McKee. Garth Hudson and Rick Danko also made appearances on the album. Robertson wrote one track, "Fallen Angel", in honor of Richard Manuel after his death in March 1986. Released on October 26, 1987, Robbie Robertson peaked at No. 35 on the Billboard 200, remaining in the top 40 for three weeks. The album charted even higher in the UK, peaking at No. 23 on the UK Albums Chart and remaining on the chart for 14 weeks. Robbie Robertson received overwhelming critical acclaim at the time of its release, being listed as one of the top 10 albums of the year by several critics in Billboard's 1987 "The Critics' Choice" feature. The album was also listed as No. 77 on Rolling Stone's 1989 list of the 100 Best Albums of the Eighties.

Robertson had his single largest hit in the UK with "Somewhere Down the Crazy River", which features spoken word verses contrasted with singing in the choruses. The song reached No. 15 in the UK Hit Singles chart and remained in the chart for 11 weeks. The video for "Somewhere Down The Crazy River" was directed by Martin Scorsese, and features Maria McKee in an acting role. In the U.S., Robbie Robertson produced several hits on the Billboard Mainstream Rock charts, with "Showdown At Big Sky" coming in the highest (#2) and "Sweet Fire Of Love" the second highest (#7). The album was nominated for a Grammy Award for "Best Rock / Vocal Album" and was certified gold in the United States in 1991. In Canada, Robertson won Album of the Year, Best Male Vocalist of the Year, and Producer of the Year at the Juno Award ceremony in 1989. In 1991, Rod Stewart recorded a version of "Broken Arrow" for his album Vagabond Heart. Stewart's version of the song reached No. 20 on the Billboard 100 chart in the United States and No. 2 on the Billboard Top Canadian Hit Singles chart in Canada. "Broken Arrow" was also performed live by the Grateful Dead with Phil Lesh on vocals.

=== Storyville (1991) ===
Storyville was released on September 30, 1991. Robertson headed to New Orleans to collaborate with some of the city's natives like Aaron and Ivan Neville and the Rebirth Brass Band. Once again, Robertson brought in Band alumni Garth Hudson and Rick Danko as contributors. The album reached No. 69 on the Billboard 200 chart. Storyville received numerous positive reviews, with Rolling Stone giving it 4 1/2 stars out of 5, and the Los Angeles Times awarding it 3 stars out of 4. Two tracks from the album, "What About Now" and "Go Back To Your Woods", charted on the Billboard Mainstream Rock charts at No. 15 and No. 32 respectively. The album was nominated for Grammy Awards in the categories "Best Rock Vocal Performance (solo)" and "Best Engineer".

=== Music for the Native Americans (1994) ===
In 1994, Robertson returned to his roots. Forming a First Nations group called the Red Road Ensemble, Robertson recorded Music for the Native Americans, a collection of songs that accompanied a television documentary series produced by TBS. The Battle of Wounded Knee and the near-extinction of the bison are outlined in the song "Ghost Dance".

=== Contact from the Underworld of Redboy (1998) ===
On Contact from the Underworld of Redboy, Robertson departed from his typical production style and delved deep into a mix of rock, native, and electronic music. He employed the services of Howie B, DJ Premier, and producer Marius de Vries (Björk, Massive Attack). Through the songs on the album, he took a close look at native traditions like Peyote healing. Rolling Stone gave the album 4 out of 5 stars, and Robertson received a Juno Award for Best Music of Aboriginal Canada Recording.

=== How to Become Clairvoyant (2011) ===
Released on April 5, 2011, How to Become Clairvoyant was Robertson's fifth solo release. It arose from impromptu demo sessions in Los Angeles with Eric Clapton. Robertson performed "Straight Down The Line" with Robert Randolph and the Roots on The Tonight Show Starring Jimmy Fallon. How to Become Clairvoyant was also released as a deluxe edition containing five bonus tracks (four demos and the exclusive track "Houdini", named after the magician Harry Houdini). It debuted at No. 13 on the Billboard 200, marking the highest debut and highest chart position for his solo work. He teamed with painter and photographer Richard Prince to produce a limited collector's edition. The 2,500 LP-sized boxes came with an art book, a numbered set of five lithographs (including pieces by Prince and photographer Anton Corbijn), a set of original tarot cards, the original tracks, and ten bonuses.

=== Sinematic (2019) ===
Released on September 20, 2019, Sinematic was Robertson's sixth solo album. It features Van Morrison joining Robertson as dueling hitmen on the track "I Hear You Paint Houses", as well as other allusions to the world of Scorsese's films. Citizen Cope, Derek Trucks, and Frédéric Yonnet made guest appearances on the album.

== Film music career ==
He's a frustrated musician, and I guess I was a frustrated filmmaker. So it was a perfect connect.

— Robertson on his working relationship with Martin Scorsese

Robertson assisted Martin Scorsese on the music for the film Raging Bull (1980). Robertson and Scorsese would go on to have a long working relationship, with Robertson finding or creating music to underscore Scorsese's films. Raging Bull was the first such collaboration, and Robertson credited his work on it for sparking his interest in sourcing and underscoring film music. Robertson supplied three newly recorded instrumental jazz tracks for sourced music, which he also produced. These three tracks feature Robertson playing guitar, along with performances from the Band alumni Garth Hudson and Richard Manuel. One of the tracks, "Webster Hall", is co-written by Robertson and Garth Hudson. Robertson also worked with Scorsese on selecting the film's opening theme music, choosing the intermezzo from Cavalleria Rusticana by Italian opera composer Pietro Mascagni. The soundtrack was finally released by Capitol Records in 2005 as a 37 track, 2-CD set.

Robertson worked with Scorsese again on his next film, The King of Comedy (1983), and is credited in the film's opening credits for "Music Production". Robertson contributed one original song, "Between Trains", to the film's soundtrack. The song was written in tribute to "Cowboy" Dan Johnson, an assistant of Scorsese's who had recently died.

In June 1986, Robertson began working with Scorsese on his next film, The Color of Money. In addition to sourcing music for the film, Robertson also composed the film's score; it was the first time Robertson had ever written a dramatic underscore for a film. Robertson brought in Canadian jazz composer Gil Evans to orchestrate the arrangements. The best-known song on The Color of Money soundtrack is Eric Clapton's "It's in the Way That You Use It", which was co-written by Robertson. "It's in the Way That You Use It" reached No. 1 on the Billboard Mainstream Rock Songs chart in January 1987. Robertson produced a song for the film with blues player Willie Dixon entitled "Don't Tell Me Nothin'"; Dixon's track was co-written with Robertson.

In 1999, Robertson contributed songs to Oliver Stone's film, Any Given Sunday.

Robertson scored Scorsese's 2019 film, The Irishman, and consulted with music supervisor Randall Poster on the entire soundtrack.

He scored Scorsese's Killers of the Flower Moon shortly before his death. The film is dedicated to Robertson. He received a posthumous Academy Award nomination for his work on the film; he was the first Indigenous person nominated for the Academy Award for Best Original Score.

== Other work ==
=== Film appearances ===
After the release of The Last Waltz, MGM/UA, who released the film, viewed Robertson as a potential film actor, and provided Robertson with an office on the MGM lot. During this time, Martin Scorsese's agent, Harry Ulfand, contacted Robertson about the idea of producing a dramatic film about traveling carnivals, which Robertson was drawn to because of his childhood experiences working in carnivals. The result was the film Carny, directed by documentary filmmaker Robert Kaylor.

Although Robertson was initially only intended to be the producer of Carny, he ended up becoming the third lead actor in the film, playing the role of Patch, the patch man. Gary Busey played "Frankie", the carnival bozo and Patch's best friend. Jodie Foster was selected to play the role of Donna, a small town girl who runs away to join the carnival and threatens to come between the two friends. The film cast real life carnies alongside professional film actors, which created a difficult atmosphere on set. Carny opened to theaters on June 13, 1980. Also in 1980, Warner Bros released a soundtrack album for Carny, which is co-credited to Robertson and composer Alex North, who wrote the orchestral score for the film. The soundtrack was re-released on compact disc by Real Gone Music in 2015.

In November 2024, Robertson posthumously appeared in the documentary Return of the King: The Fall and Rise of Elvis Presley.

In October 2025, Robertson would posthumously appear in the documentary series Mr. Scorsese.

=== Writing ===
Robertson co-authored Legends, Icons and Rebels: Music That Changed the World with his son, Sebastian Robertson, and colleagues Jim Guerinot and Jared Levine. He also wrote Hiawatha and the Peacemaker, illustrated by David Shannon. His autobiography, Testimony, written over the course of five years, was published by Crown Archetype in November 2016.

In April 2025, Penguin Random House Canada publishers announced that a second volume of Robertson's memoirs, focused on his working relationship with Martin Scorsese, would be published in November 2025.

== Personal life ==
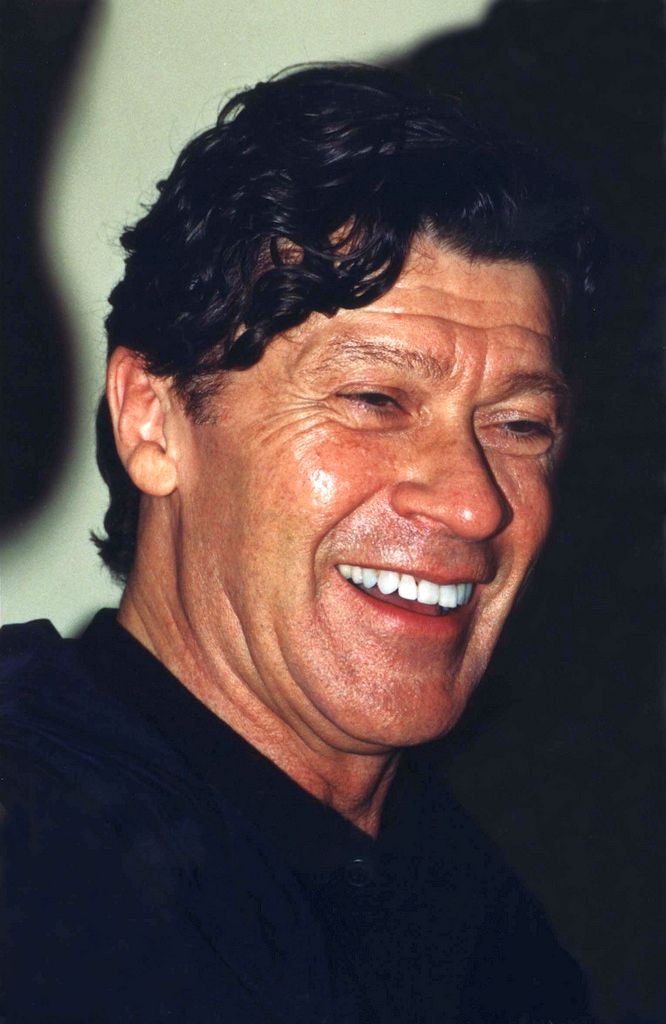
Robertson in 2000

On March 24, 1968, Robertson married Dominique Bourgeois, a Canadian journalist. They had two daughters and a son named Sebastian. The marriage ended in divorce.

Robertson married his girlfriend of four years, Canadian entrepreneur, restaurateur, and Top Chef Canada judge Janet Zuccarini, on March 12, 2023. Their marriage occurred only five months before his death.

Robertson was also involved in social causes and was a member of the Canadian charity Artists Against Racism, using his platform to support anti-racism initiatives and public awareness campaigns.

== Death and tributes ==
Robertson died at a Los Angeles hospital on August 9, 2023, at the age of 80, after a year-long battle with prostate cancer. His longtime manager, Jared Levine, stated that Robertson was surrounded by his family at the time of his death. In lieu of flowers, Levine requested that donations be made to the Six Nations of the Grand River, honoring Robertson’s heritage and lifelong connection to the community.

In November 2023, director Martin Scorsese held a tribute concert for Robertson in Los Angeles. Notable guests in attendance were Joni Mitchell, Leonardo DiCaprio, and Lily Gladstone.

In October 2024, another tribute concert with Scorsese's involvement was held at the Kia Forum.

=== Aftermath ===
In May 2024, Robertson's three adult children filed a lawsuit against his wife, Janet Zuccarini, alleging elder abuse and undue influence. The suit claimed that during a period of significant health decline, Zuccarini took advantage of Robertson's weakened condition to have him sign legal documents that would financially benefit her in the event of his death, without the full awareness or involvement of his children.

== Filmography ==
Year	Title	Role(s)	Notes	Ref.
1972	Eat the Document	Performer		
1978	The Last Waltz	Performer/producer	Directed by Martin Scorsese	
1980	Carny	Actor/writer/producer/composer		
1980	Raging Bull	Music consultant	Directed by Martin Scorsese	
1982	The King of Comedy	Music producer/composer	Directed by Martin Scorsese	
1986	The Color of Money	Composer	Directed by Martin Scorsese	
1994	Jimmy Hollywood	Composer		
1995	Robbie Robertson: Going Home	Documentary		
1995	Casino	Music consultant	Directed by Martin Scorsese	
1995	The Crossing Guard	Actor		
1996	Phenomenon	Executive producer		
1996	Dakota Exile	Narrator	Documentary	
1999	Forces of Nature	Creative music consultant		
1999	Wolves	Narrator		
1999	Any Given Sunday	Songs		
2001	The Life and Times	Himself	Episode: "A Portrait of Robbie Robertson"	
2002	Gangs of New York	Executive music producer	Directed by Martin Scorsese	
2003	Festival Express	Performer		
2004	Ladder 49	Original song "Shine Your Light"		
2007	Eric Clapton: Crossroads Guitar Festival 2007	Performer		
2010	Shutter Island	Music supervisor	Directed by Martin Scorsese	
2012	Curse of the Axe	Narrator	Documentary	
2013	Eric Clapton: Crossroads Guitar Festival 2013	Performer		
2013	The Wolf of Wall Street	Executive music producer	Directed by Martin Scorsese	
2016	Silence	Executive music producer	Directed by Martin Scorsese	
2017	Rumble: The Indians Who Rocked the World	Performer		
2018–23	Native America	Narrator	TV documentary series	
2019	The Irishman	Executive producer / composer	Directed by Martin Scorsese	
2019	Once Were Brothers: Robbie Robertson and the Band	Himself		
2023	Killers of the Flower Moon	Composer	Directed by Martin Scorsese; posthumous release	
2024	Return of the King: The Fall and Rise of Elvis Presley	Himself	Documentary; posthumous release	

== Discography ==
- Robbie Robertson (1987)
- Storyville (1991)
- Music for the Native Americans (soundtrack) (1994)
- Contact from the Underworld of Redboy (1998)
- How to Become Clairvoyant (2011)
- Sinematic (2019)

== Honours and accolades ==
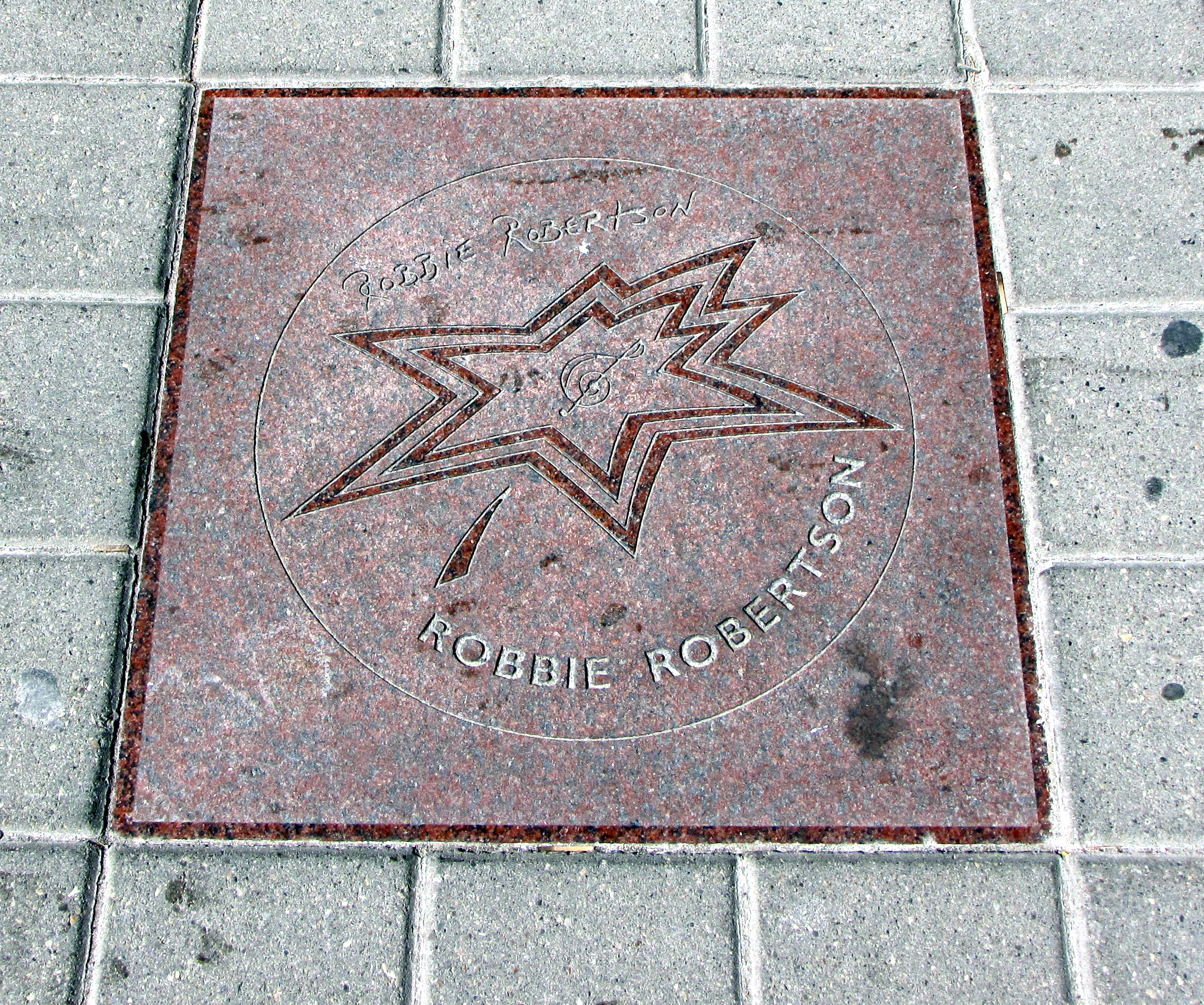
Robbie Robertson's star on Canada's Walk of Fame

The Band (including Robertson) was inducted into the Canadian Music Hall of Fame in 1989 and the Rock and Roll Hall of Fame in 1994. In 1997, Robertson received a Lifetime Achievement Award from the National Academy of Songwriters. In 2003, Robertson received the Indspire Aboriginal Lifetime Achievement Award. In 2003, Robertson was inducted into Canada's Walk of Fame.

In 2005, Robertson received an honorary doctorate from York University. In 2006, he received the Governor General's Performing Arts Award for Lifetime Artistic Achievement, Canada's highest honour in the performing arts. In 2008, Robertson and the Band received the Grammy Lifetime Achievement Award. In 2011, Robertson was inducted into the Canadian Songwriters Hall of Fame. On May 27, 2011, Robertson was made an Officer of the Order of Canada by Governor General David Johnston. In 2014, the Band was inducted into Canada's Walk of Fame.

On October 14, 2017, Robertson received the first Lifetime Achievement Award from the community of Six Nations. In 2019, Robertson was given a key to the city of Toronto by Mayor John Tory during a TIFF press conference for Once Were Brothers: Robbie Robertson and The Band, a documentary about Robertson. In 2019, Robertson was the recipient of the Lifetime Achievement Award in the Canadian Music Industry Hall of Fame from Canadian Music Week (CMW).

Robertson is ranked 59th in Rolling Stone magazine's 2011 list of the 100 greatest guitarists of all time.

Year	Association	Category	Project	Result	Ref.
1989	Grammy Awards	Best Rock Vocal Performance, Male	Robbie Robertson	Nominated	
1992	Grammy Awards	Best Rock Vocal Performance, Solo	Storyville	Nominated	
1995	Primetime Emmy Awards	Outstanding Individual Achievement - Cultural Programming	Robbie Robertson: Going Home	Nominated	
1995	Primetime Emmy Awards	Outstanding Music and Lyrics ("Pray")	Robbie Robertson: Going Home	Nominated	
1999	Grammy Awards	Best World Music Album	Contact from the Underworld of Redboy	Nominated	
2004	Grammy Awards	Best Soundtrack for Visual Media	Gangs of New York	Nominated	
2015	Grammy Awards	Best Soundtrack for Visual Media	The Wolf of Wall Street	Nominated	
2019	Critics' Choice Movie Awards	Best Original Score	The Irishman	Nominated	
2023	Hollywood Music in Media Awards	Best Original Score in a Feature Film	Killers of the Flower Moon	Won	
2023	Washington D.C. Area Film Critics Association Awards	Best Score	Killers of the Flower Moon	Nominated	
2023	Chicago Film Critics Association Awards	Best Original Score	Killers of the Flower Moon	Won	
2023	Dallas–Fort Worth Film Critics Association Awards	Best Musical Score	Killers of the Flower Moon	Won	
2023	St. Louis Film Critics Association Awards	Best Score	Killers of the Flower Moon	Runner-up	
2023	Golden Globe Awards	Best Original Score	Killers of the Flower Moon	Nominated	
2023	Critics' Choice Movie Awards	Best Original Score	Killers of the Flower Moon	Nominated	
2023	Academy Awards	Best Original Score	Killers of the Flower Moon	Nominated	
