= It Makes No Difference =

Robbie Robertson song

Song by The Band

from the album Northern Lights – Southern Cross
- Released: November 1975
- Genre: Rock
- Length: 6:34
- Label: Capitol
- Songwriter(s): Robbie Robertson
- Producer(s): The Band

"It Makes No Difference" is a song written by Robbie Robertson and sung by Rick Danko that was first released by The Band on their 1975 album Northern Lights – Southern Cross. It has also appeared on live and compilation albums, including the soundtrack to the film The Last Waltz. Among the artists that have covered the song are Solomon Burke, My Morning Jacket, The Icicle Works, Trey Anastasio, Over the Rhine and Eric Clapton.

== Lyrics and music ==
Critic Barney Hoskyns described "It Makes No Difference" as "an artlessly simple country-soul ballad." The Band biographer Craig Harris considers it "one of pop music's saddest songs." Music critic Nick DeRiso similarly states that "The Band, as a whole, has never constructed a sadder moment, nor one with more direct specificity." The song's theme is the singer's inability to get over a failed relationship. Among the metaphors used to portray the singer's sadness are images of weather, such as the sun never shining, constant rain and clouds hanging low.

Critics have attributed much of the success of "It Makes No Difference" to Rick Danko's lead vocal. Hoskyns considers that "there is something so elemental" in how Danko expresses his loss that it "transcends self-pity". According to DeRiso, Danko's vocal manages to express the "lonesome bottom of this song while retaining its sense of reckless emotional abandon," without ever sounding resigned to his fate. Levon Helm and Richard Manuel add harmony vocals on the chorus, adding to the sense of pain. Hoskyns and DeRiso also credit Robertson's and Garth Hudson's "anguished" guitar and saxophone solos for complementing the effect of the vocals. According to DeRiso, Danko, Hudson and Robertson are all "walking the same fine line — Danko, between torment and utter heartsick disaster; Hudson and Robertson between stabbing attempts at redemption and a reluctant acceptance."

According to Robertson, "I wrote this song specifically for Rick to sing and when we first started discovering the possibilities, it kept expanding to more levels of emotion. What Garth and I could add to finalize the statement of this song was purely instinctual."

== Personnel ==
Credits are adapted from the liner notes of A Musical History.

- Rick Danko - lead vocals, bass guitar
- Levon Helm - drums, backing vocals
- Garth Hudson - Lowrey organ, saxophone
- Richard Manuel - piano, backing vocals
- Robbie Robertson - electric guitar

== Reception ==
According to The New Rolling Stone Album Guide critic Mark Kemp, "It Makes No Difference" is one of three songs on Northern Lights – Southern Cross, along with "Ophelia" and "Acadian Driftwood," on which "Robertson reclaims his reputation as one of rock's great songwriters. Hoskyns considers it and "Acadian Driftwood" to be "the most moving songs Robertson had written in five years." Allmusic critic Rob Bowman claims that it "might be the best romantic ballad ever done by the group." The Sarasota Herald-Tribune described the song as "poignant" and praised its eloquence as being worthy of a Grammy Award. Pittsburgh Post-Gazette critic Ed Masley considers "It Makes No Difference" to be "Robertson's best song," praising its majesty and "heartbreaking soul."

== Other appearances ==
"It Makes No Difference" has appeared on many of The Band's live and compilation albums. A live performance was included on both the film The Last Waltz and both the 1978 version and 2002 version of its soundtrack album. AllMusic critic Mark Deming describes this rendition as "impassioned." In a generally negative review of the album, The Michigan Daily's R.J. Smith praises the performance of "It Makes No Difference" for Danko's "superb" vocal and for the group's "intensity." Another live version was included on Live in Tokyo 1983. The song has been included on the compilation albums The Best of the Band (1976), To Kingdom Come: The Definitive Collection (1989) and Greatest Hits (2000). It was also included on the box sets Across the Great Divide (1994) and A Musical History (2005).

== Cover versions ==
Solomon Burke covered "It Makes No Difference" on his 2005 album Make Do with What You Got. Deming praises his version for bring the song "to vivid and passionate life that's thrilling to hear." My Morning Jacket covered "It Makes No Difference" on the 2007 tribute album Endless Highway: The Music of The Band. Ben Windham of The Tuscaloosa News particularly praised the lead vocal and "biting guitar" of this version. My Morning Jacket also covered the song on Love for Levon in 2012. Over the Rhine covered the song on their 2013 album Meet Me at the Edge of the World. AllMusic critic James Christopher Monger praised their version as "a soulful, Carole King-inspired take.". Post-punk group the Mekons also covered the song on their F.U.N. 90 EP from 1990. Trey Anastasio covers the song with his band, the Trey Anastasio Band. Shannon McNally covered the song on her 2017 album Black Irish produced by Rodney Crowell. The Icicle Works covered the song on their 1986 EP ‘Up Here In The North of England’. Eric Clapton performed a cover of it at Scotiabank Arena in Toronto, Canada on September 10, 2023, in tribute to the passing of Robbie Robertson
