= Acadian Driftwood =

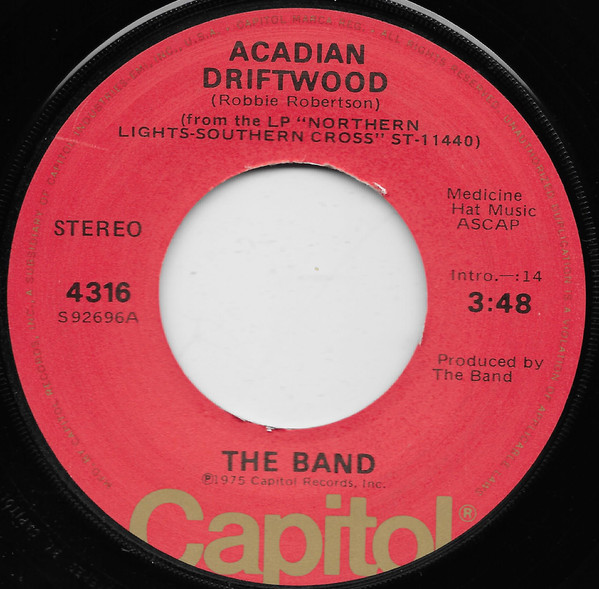
- 1976 single B-side label

Single by The Band

from the album Northern Lights – Southern Cross
- A-side: "Twilight"
- Released: 1976
- Recorded: 1975
- Genre: Roots rock, Canadiana
- Length: 6:42, single duration 3:48
- Label: Capitol Records
- Songwriter: Robbie Robertson
- Producer: The Band

The Band singles chronology
"Ophelia/Hobo Jungle" (1975)	"Acadian Driftwood" (1976)	"Georgia on My Mind/The Night They Drove Old Dixie Down" (1977)

"Acadian Driftwood" is a song by the Band. It was the fourth track on their sixth studio album Northern Lights – Southern Cross (1975), written by member Robbie Robertson. Richard Manuel, Levon Helm and Rick Danko trade off lead vocals and harmonize on the chorus.

== Overview ==
The song is a portrayal of the troubled history of Nova Scotia and Acadia. Specifically, it is about the Expulsion of the Acadians during the war between the French and the British over what is now Nova Scotia, New Brunswick, Prince Edward Island and most of Maine.

Robertson's lyrics were influenced by Henry Wadsworth Longfellow's 1847 poem Evangeline, which describes the deportation of Acadians. On The Band's recording of the song, the lead vocal is traded on the verses between Richard Manuel, Levon Helm, and Rick Danko, with all three singers harmonizing on the choruses. Instrumentally, the recording is noted for its overdubbed fiddle playing by Byron Berline.

Robertson took poetic license with the historical record. The deportations happened during the French and Indian War that had erupted in North America prior to the opening of the wider conflict of the Seven Years War, so "the war" was not "over" but in fact had only just begun. The expulsion commenced immediately after the British capture of Fort Beauséjour (1755) in present-day New Brunswick and not after "What went down on the Plains of Abraham," a battle fought in 1759 in Quebec. The deportations ended when the war ended, with the signing of the Treaty of Paris (1763).

AllMusic critic Rob Bowman described "Acadian Driftwood" as "a slightly more complex and ambitious (and successful) down-north analog to "The Night They Drove Old Dixie Down." The Sarasota Herald-Tribune affirmed the relationship with "The Night They Drove Old Dixie Down," noting that it had much of "the tone and historical sensitivity" as the earlier song. The Herald-Tribune further noted that the song deals with the theme in a way that not only highlights the plight of the Acadians but also relates it to continuing oppression in the world.

== Reception ==
Bowman rated "Acadian Driftwood" as "one of Robertson's finest compositions, equal to anything else the Band ever recorded." According to The New Rolling Stone Album Guide critic Mark Kemp, "Acadian Driftwood" is one of three songs on Northern Lights – Southern Cross, along with "Ophelia" and "It Makes No Difference," on which "Robertson reclaims his reputation as one of rock's great songwriters. Music critic Colin Larkin concurred that it is "one of Robertson's most evocative compositions." Music critic Barney Hoskyns considers it and "It Makes No Difference" to be "the most moving songs Robertson had written in five years." Dave Zurawik of The Milwaukee Sentinel praises the way the song "rattle[s] in [his] head and reverberates off [his] unconscious" for a long time.

Rolling Stone commented that in spite of a few factual inaccuracies, "there's no better single song that spotlights the voices of Rick Danko, Levon Helm and Richard Manuel than "Acadian Driftwood" ... The song is absolutely beautiful and features stellar fiddle work by Byron Berline".

In his book American Driftwood, about the history of Cajun and Zydeco music, Paul-Emile Comeau states that American Songwriter magazine called "Acadian Driftwood" a masterpiece of Acadian music. In addition to the book, Comeau produced a 13-part series called the Connexion Acadiene for CBC Radio and NPR.

== Personnel ==
Credits are adapted from the liner notes of A Musical History.

- Richard Manuel – lead and backing vocals, clavinet
- Levon Helm – lead and backing vocals, drums
- Rick Danko – lead and backing vocals, bass guitar
- Robbie Robertson – acoustic guitar (open tuning)
- Garth Hudson – accordion, piccolo, chanter
- Byron Berline – fiddle

== Performance history ==
"Acadian Driftwood" was performed by The Band as part of their famous Last Waltz concert. The concert performance was omitted from the Martin Scorsese film of the concert and the original 1978 soundtrack, but was included in the 2002 box set soundtrack.

Richard Shindell also covered the song on his 2007 album South of Delia, as did The Roches on the 2007 multi-artist tribute album, Endless Highway: The Music of The Band. Zachary Richard and Celine Dion also covered the song as a duet on Richard's 2009 album Last Kiss. Shawn Colvin covered it on her 2015 album Uncovered. Phil Beer frequently plays "Acadian Driftwood" in his solo performances, and with the Phil Beer Band and included it on his 2005 studio album Rhythm Methodist.
