= List of Basement Tapes songs (1975) =

The liner notes for The Basement Tapes give the following personnel credits for all songs on the album: Bob Dylan – acoustic guitar, piano, vocals; Robbie Robertson – electric guitar, acoustic guitar, drums, vocals; Richard Manuel – piano, drums, harmonica, vocals; Rick Danko – electric bass, mandolin, vocals; Garth Hudson – organ, clavinet, accordion, tenor saxophone, piano; Levon Helm – drums, mandolin, electric bass, vocals. In his book Million Dollar Bash, Sid Griffin analyzes each track and gives informed guesses about who is playing what, based on his insights into the six musicians' performance styles on various instruments, and his interviews with Robertson and engineer Rob Fraboni. Griffin's credits are listed below. All tracks by Bob Dylan and the Band were recorded in Woodstock, June to October 1967. Tracks by the Band are as indicated.

== Side one ==
=== "Odds and Ends" ===
Dylan – vocal; Robertson – electric guitar; Hudson – organ; Danko – bass, backing vocal; Manuel – drums. Overdubbed 1975: Hudson or Manuel – piano.

The chorus of the opening song—"Odds and ends, odds and ends/Lost time is not found again"—functions as "a kind of editorial comment on the entire Basement Tapes", writes Andy Gill, emphasizing the songs' "fragmentary form and fleeting pleasures". Clinton Heylin suggests that this was one of the final basement songs to be recorded, and that here Dylan acknowledges that "when it came to spouting catchphrase choruses while espousing mock profundities in the verses, the process had just about run its course. Dylan admits as much by singing, 'I've had enough, my box is clean/You know what I'm saying and you know what I mean'."

=== "Orange Juice Blues (Blues for Breakfast)" ===
Manuel – vocal, piano; Danko – bass. Recorded in Woodstock, 1967. Overdubbed 1975: Robertson – guitar; Hudson – organ, saxophone; Helm – drums.

Manuel and Danko laid down the basic track in Woodstock in 1967, according to Griffin, and the contributions of the rest of the Band were overdubbed eight years later. Critic Dave Hopkins notes that the demo version included as a bonus track on the 2000 Music from Big Pink reissue is the same performance, without overdubbing. Griffin calls the song "charming in its own right", but says it would not have fit in on the original Music from Big Pink because it was all too obviously from their past: "an up-tempo bluesy number that the Hawks might have played" in rural Ontario in 1964. Barney Hoskyns describes the song as one of the Band's early recordings that revealed "the breathtaking scope" of their musical range; he praises "the rollicking bar-room R&B style" of the performance.

=== "Million Dollar Bash" ===
Dylan – vocal, guitar; Hudson – organ; Manuel – piano, backing vocal; Danko – bass, backing vocal.

According to Dylan biographer Robert Shelton, "Million Dollar Bash" epitomizes what he sees as one of The Basement Tapes' principal themes – joy. Griffin named his detailed book about The Basement Tapes after this song, which has a similar instrumentation to 1950s rockabilly hits. According to Griffin, "Like Elvis's earliest single on Sun Records, the lack of a drummer does not prevent the assembled from swinging on this nonsense like the experienced players they are." Heylin heard in this song two references to the Coasters: "'Along came Jones'—a song title in itself—and 'emptied the trash'—a reference to 'Yakety Yak'." The song was released as The Basement Tapes' only single, b/w "Tears of Rage" (see below). It would be almost forty years before Dylan would perform the track, presenting it to an initially confused but joyous crowd during one of his shows in Brixton, London, in 2005.

In a 2014 interview promoting the release of The Bootleg Series Vol. 11: The Basement Tapes Complete, Dylan cited the Summer of Love as an impetus for the song.

=== "Yazoo Street Scandal" ===
Helm – mandolin, vocal; Robertson – guitar; Hudson – organ; Danko – bass; Manuel – drums. Recorded in Woodstock, late 1967.

This is one of the earliest examples of the Band's "grittily distinctive" sound coming together, according to Hoskyns. Its author, Robertson, has explained that it was based on an actual Yazoo Street in a town in Arkansas, Helm's home state: "I thought, 'Wow, they don't have streets like that in Canada. There's no streets up there called Yazoo!' It was like, 'Jesus, let me make up a little story here about stuff going on in this kind of almost red light district.' Everything was lit in red in that song for me." Initially, Robertson recorded the lead vocal for the first version of this song, but because it was set in the South, the Hawks decided that Levon Helm would be a more appropriate singer, employing what Hoskyns describes as his "best redneck-wildcat yelp".

=== "Goin' to Acapulco" ===
Dylan – vocal; Robertson – guitar; Hudson – organ; Danko – bass, backing vocal; Manuel – drums, backing vocal.

The release of this song, which had not previously appeared on any demo tapes or bootlegs, made clear that more basement tracks existed than fans had believed. "The song proposes a romp in that posh Mexican resort, but the heavy spirit is down in Juarez again", writes Shelton, who hears the anguish of Blonde on Blonde return to haunt the "basement proceedings". Heylin comments on its uninhibited sexual innuendo, "featuring the usual debauched narrator, rambunctious harmonies, and euphemistic ribaldry" of what he regards as the best basement songs.

=== "Katie's Been Gone" ===
Manuel – piano, vocal; Robertson – guitar; Hudson – organ; Danko – bass, backing vocal. Recording date disputed. Overdubbed 1975: Hudson – additional keyboards; (possibly) Helm – drums.

Probably one of the first numbers written by Manuel and Robertson in mid-1967, one of "the songs that all but announced the birth of the Band". The song is believed to have been inspired by singer Karen Dalton, a friend of Dylan's. A different mix of the same recording was released as a bonus track on the 2000 Music from Big Pink reissue. Griffin believes this was recorded in Woodstock, with drums overdubbed in 1975. Hoskyns asserts it was "almost certainly" recorded at CBS's Studio E in New York in September 1967, with a drummer present, possibly Gary Chester.

== Side two ==
=== "Lo and Behold" ===
Dylan – vocal, guitar; Hudson – organ; Manuel – piano, backing vocal; Danko – bass, backing vocal.

This is, for Heylin, another "song that gives precedence to word play over sense". Griffin notes that it is held together by "one of the key phrases of the Old Testament prophets in the King James Bible: Lo and behold!" "The whole song reads like a tall tale told by a self-aggrandizing barfly", writes Gill. "The rousing chorus harmonies—which prefigure the famous chorus harmonies which would become one of the hallmarks of the Band's music—join in like drinking pals saluting him with foaming beakers, urging the narrator on to ever more ridiculous flights of fancy, rising at the end to leave him no place to go but further into fantasy, the true source of American identity." "Lo and Behold" was adopted as the title of an album of unreleased Dylan songs—including a half-dozen basement tracks—recorded by the British group Coulson, Dean, McGuinness, Flint in 1972.

=== "Bessie Smith" ===
Danko – vocal, bass; Robertson – vocal, guitar; Manuel – piano; Hudson – organ; Helm – drums, backing vocal. Recording date disputed.

Rob Bowman stated in 2005 that this track was "probably" recorded at an "unknown studio" in late 1968. But in the notes for the 2000 reissue of the Band's fourth album, Cahoots, it is written that "Robbie [Robertson] is certain that 'Bessie Smith' was recorded sometime between their 1969 second album and Stage Fright", the group's third album, issued the following year. Based on the testimony of engineer Rob Fraboni, Griffin asserts that "Bessie Smith" was recorded by the Band in 1975 in their Shangri-La studio in Los Angeles, as The Basement Tapes was being prepared for official release. He calls it "the most far-fetched selection included on the official Basement Tapes release, even by Robertson's broad standards." A cover version of the song was issued in 1970 under the title "Going Down To See Bessie" on the self-titled debut album by Happy And Artie Traum. Critical reaction to the song is divided: Thomas Ward of Allmusic described it as "arguably one of the slightest and most routine songs of all the 'basement tapes'", and noted that it lacked many of the key qualities of Dylan and the Band's other work on the album. Rock critic Greil Marcus, on the other hand, describes the song as a "lovely idea", "the plaint of one of Bessie's lovers". Hoskyns, singling out Hudson's keyboard playing, writes that the song is "transformed by Garth into something as magically evocative as an old silent movie."

=== "Clothes Line Saga" ===
Dylan – vocal; Robertson – guitar; Hudson – keyboards; Danko – bass; Manuel – drums.

On the safety copy of the Basement Tapes, this song was labeled "Answer to Ode". Heylin interprets it as a parody of "Ode to Billie Joe", which was a hit single for Bobbie Gentry in mid-1967 when the basement songs were being taped. He calls it "as deadpan a deconstruction" of the Gentry hit as the Blonde on Blonde track "4th Time Around" was of The Beatles' "Norwegian Wood". (He adds that, in his view, Dylan generally parodied songs that he liked.) For Heylin, it illustrates Dylan's feeling that folk songs delivered "the underground story". An event with potentially world-shaking implications—"The vice president's gone mad!"—is treated in a detached, stoic manner by the community: "There's nothing we can do about it". The narrative piles up both banal and surreal details, but "Dylan delivers the 'saga' in the most laconic manner imaginable".

=== "Apple Suckling Tree" ===
Dylan – vocal, piano; Hudson – organ; Manuel – tambourine, backing vocal; Danko – bass, backing vocal; Robertson – drums.

Critic Greil Marcus identifies the tune as that of the ancient children's ditty "Froggy Went A-Courtin'" and quotes Danko's description of the recording: "It all felt natural, we didn't rehearse. One or two takes from conception, on paper, to the finish. We all knew it would never happen twice." Describing it as a good-natured nonsense song that really swings, Griffin suggests it was one of the last basement compositions to be recorded before Helm arrived in Woodstock and Dylan departed for Nashville.

=== "Please, Mrs. Henry" ===
Dylan – vocal, guitar; Hudson – organ; Manuel – piano, backing vocal; Danko – bass, backing vocal.

Heylin describes this as a hilariously bawdy song in which the singer yearns for relief both sexual ("Look Mrs Henry/There's only so much I can do/Why don't you look my way an' pump me a few?") and scatological ("Now I'm startin' to drain/My stool's gonna squeak/If I walk too much farther/My crane's gonna leak"). Marcus describes it as "a detailed explanation, addressed to either a landlady or a madam of just what it means to be too drunk to move, if not complain."

=== "Tears of Rage" ===
Dylan – vocal, guitar; Robertson – electric guitar; Hudson – organ; Manuel – piano, backing vocal; Danko – bass, backing vocal.

"Tears of Rage" is one of the most widely acclaimed songs from The Basement Tapes. Gill likens it to King Lear's soliloquy on the blasted heath in Shakespeare's tragedy: "Wracked with bitterness and regret, its narrator reflects upon promises broken and truths ignored, on how greed has poisoned the well of best intentions, and how even daughters can deny their father's wishes." He suggests that Dylan is linking the anguish of Lear's soliloquy to the divisions in American society apparent in 1967, as the Vietnam War escalated: "In its narrowest and most contemporaneous interpretation, the song could be the first to register the pain of betrayal felt by many of America's Vietnam war veterans. … In a wider interpretation [it] harks back to what anti-war protesters and critics of American materialism in general felt was a more fundamental betrayal of the American Declaration of Independence and the Bill of Rights." A strong Biblical theme runs through this song, according to Griffin, who notes that "life is brief" is a recurrent message in the Old Testament books Psalms and Isaiah. As a father, Dylan realizes now that "no broken heart hurts more than the broken heart of a distraught parent." Griffin calls the four minutes of this song "as representative of community, ageless truths and the unbreakable bonds of family as anything in the Band's canon—or anyone else's canon."

Marcus suggests that the "famous beginning"—"We carried you/In our arms/On Independence Day"—evokes a naming ceremony not just for a child but also for a whole nation. He writes that "in Dylan's singing—an ache from deep in the chest, a voice thick with care in the first recording of the song—the song is from the start a sermon and an elegy, a Kaddish."

== Side three ==
=== "Too Much of Nothing" ===
Dylan – vocal, guitar; Robertson – electric guitar; Hudson – organ; Manuel – piano, backing vocal; Danko – bass, backing vocal. Overdubbed 1975: Hudson – additional keyboards; Helm – (possibly) drums, backing vocal.

One of the most haunting themes of The Basement Tapes is an apprehension of the void. Shelton hears in this song an echo of the bald statement that Lear makes to his daughter Cordelia, "Nothing will come of nothing" (act I, scene 1). Marcus asserts that this was one of the songs recorded at the end of "the basement summer" in August or September 1967. He writes that these songs "are taken slowly, with crying voices. Dylan's voice is high and constantly bending, carried forward not by rhythm or by melody but by the discovery of the true terrain of the songs as they're sung. Richard Manuel's and Rick Danko's voices are higher still, more exposed."

By November 1967, this song was a Top 40 hit for Peter, Paul and Mary. In Dylan's original, the chorus addresses two ladies—"Say hello to Valerie/Say hello to Vivian/Send them all my salary/On the waters of oblivion"—but Peter, Paul and Mary changed the second name to "Marion," displeasing Dylan. According to the trio's Paul Stookey, Dylan consequently became disenchanted with the group: "We just became other hacks that were doing his tunes." Patrick Humphries notes that, whether by accident or design, the two women originally named share the names of the two wives of the major 20th-century poet T. S. Eliot. (Note: Eliot married Vivienne Haigh-Wood in 1915; they separated in 1933. Critics consider their marriage central to his writing The Waste Land (Gordon 2000, pp. 147–192). Eliot married Valerie Fletcher in January 1957, near the end of his life (Gordon 2000, pp. 496–536).)

=== "Yea! Heavy and a Bottle of Bread" ===
Dylan – vocal, guitar; Hudson – organ; Manuel – piano, backing vocal; Danko – bass, backing vocal.

The meaning of this song's lyric is unfathomable. In Gill's description, the lines appear to be knocked together from offhand phrases that display "an instinct for the enigmatic which rescues the song from being forgettable". Marcus calls it "the ultimate basement performance: an irreducible little throwaway that could have come from nowhere else." The low harmony part on the chorus is supplied by Manuel.

=== "Ain't No More Cane" ===
Helm – bass, vocal; Robertson – guitar, vocal; Hudson – accordion; Danko – mandolin, vocal; Manuel – drums, vocal. Recording date disputed.

This is a traditional Southern prison work song that Helm learned from his father while growing up in Arkansas. It had been recorded by several artists, including Lead Belly. Bowman states that this track was recorded between late 1967 and early 1968 in an "unknown studio". Fraboni recalled taping it with the Band years later at their Shangri-La studio in Los Angeles. "I remember doing it when we did 'Bessie Smith' in '75. They are both great songs and sound cool," he told Griffin. Helm sings the first verse; Robertson, the second; Danko, the third; and Manuel, the fourth. All four sing harmony on the chorus. Ward calls the song "one of the joys of the whole collection".

=== "Crash on the Levee (Down in the Flood)" ===
Dylan – vocal, guitar; Hudson – organ; Manuel – piano; Danko – bass.

In 1927, after the Mississippi floods had left half a million people homeless, Memphis Minnie and Kansas Joe recorded "When the Levee Breaks"; they sang, "Oh crying won't help you, praying won't do no good/When the levee breaks, mama you got to move". A 1975 reviewer wrote that "Dylan's song repeated these images, but ... added the Biblical notion that the flood was retribution for some past sin: 'Now it's sugar for sugar and salt for salt/If you go down in the flood it's gonna be your fault'." These lines are adapted from "James Alley Blues" by Richard "Rabbit" Brown—a song Dylan would have heard on Harry Smith's Anthology of American Folk Music.

=== "Ruben Remus" ===
Manuel – vocal, piano; Robertson – guitar; Hudson – organ; Danko – bass, backing vocal; Helm – drums. Recording date disputed.

The Band recorded at least four versions of the song: at two different Woodstock sessions, as well as at 1967 and 1968 studio sessions. Fraboni has identified the version on the album as an early 1968 Music from Big Pink sessions outtake, but Bowman's liner notes for A Musical History date it as a Woodstock recording from September–November 1967. Griffin says the song is "as effortlessly charming as 'Katie's Been Gone' and 'Ferdinand The Impostor', two more outtakes from the same era."

=== "Tiny Montgomery" ===
Dylan – vocal, guitar; Robertson – electric guitar, backing vocal; Hudson – organ; Manuel – backing vocal; Danko – bass, backing vocal.

This song is, according to Heylin, perhaps the first of the original compositions that Dylan and the Band recorded in Big Pink, having warmed up on a wide range of traditional material. He calls it "the prototype for a number of standout songs in a new-found style" that employs uninhibited, nonsensical lyrics: "Scratch your dad/Do that bird/Suck that pig/And bring it on home". He suggests that "this kind of wordplay would have had Edward Lear reaching for the smelling salts", as all pretense of sense is abandoned.

== Side four ==
=== "You Ain't Goin' Nowhere" ===
Dylan – vocal, guitar; Hudson – organ; Manuel – piano, backing vocal; Danko – bass, backing vocal; Robertson – drums. Overdubbed 1975: Robertson – electric guitar.

A first take of this song, unreleased until 2014's The Bootleg Series Vol. 11: The Basement Tapes Complete, features a stream of nonsensical lyrics, held together by the chorus, "Now look here dear soup, you'd best feed the cats/The cats need feeding and you're the one to do it/Get your hat, feed the cats/You ain't goin' nowhere". For Heylin, this first version demonstrates Dylan's talent for delivering "strings of pearls wrapped in riddles. ... Dylan had a tune, the last line of each verse (i.e., the title), and the chorus."

The Basement Tapes version, the second take, fleshes out the verses into something closer to a narrative. Gill argues that the first verse possesses a "stark rural cohesion" via its "brisk meteorological details"—frozen railings, rain and clouds—but the succeeding verses become more and more fantastic, ending with a non-sequitur about Genghis Khan supplying his kings with sleep.

The Byrds' version, released as a single on April 2, 1968, reached number 74 on the Billboard Hot 100. They transformed it into a classic of the then burgeoning genre of country rock, whereas on the basement version the country music flavor is more of an undercurrent, suggested by "the lilting chorus melody". Roger McGuinn felt that the song was perfect for the Byrds: "It was country-ish and had that Dylan mystique where you couldn't really figure what he was talking about, yet the lyrics nevertheless drew you in. ... I always thought it was about when Bob was laid up in Woodstock after the bike accident and sure wasn't going anywhere."

=== "Don't Ya Tell Henry" ===
Helm – mandolin, vocal; Robertson – guitar; Hudson – piano; Danko – bass, backing vocal; Manuel – drums. Recording date disputed.

This song was written by Dylan, and there is a 1967 recording with the Band on which he sings lead. The version sung by Dylan appears on The Bootleg Series Vol. 11: The Basement Tapes Complete.

According to Bowman, the Band-only version released on The Basement Tapes was recorded between late 1967 and early 1968 in an "unknown studio". Griffin, however, reports that Fraboni identified it as having been recorded in 1975. Griffin characterizes this version as musically superior to the "drunk-as-skunks" rendition with Dylan.

=== "Nothing Was Delivered" ===
Dylan – vocal, guitar; Robertson – electric guitar; Hudson – organ; Manuel – piano, backing vocal; Danko – bass, backing vocal.

For Marcus, Dylan's "cool cowboy vocal" helped turn it into the "best rewrite of Fats Domino's 'Blueberry Hill' anybody's ever heard." And Roger McGuinn heard a story behind this song: "'Nothing Was Delivered' sounded like a drug deal gone bad. It had a slightly dark or ominous tone." McGuinn also compared the song to Fats Domino and "Blueberry Hill". The Byrds recorded it for Sweetheart of the Rodeo. And for Shelton, it was one more reminder that the boozy camaraderie of The Basement Tapes is constantly subverted by an aching sense of nothingness and a quest for salvation.

=== "Open the Door, Homer" ===
Dylan – vocal, guitar; Robertson – electric guitar; Hudson – organ; Manuel – piano, backing vocal; Danko – bass, backing vocal.

The refrain of this song is lifted from a 1947 number one hit by Count Basie, "Open the Door, Richard"—which is what Dylan actually sings in his chorus. That song was based on a 1919 vaudeville skit by Harlem comic John Mason, so, as Griffin puts it, "this is a nonsense song based on a nonsense song". According to Heylin, Homer was "apparently" a nickname for the late novelist and musician Richard Fariña, a friend of Dylan's. Fariña died in a motorcycle crash on April 30, 1966, on his way home from a launch party for his debut novel, Been Down So Long It Looks Like Up to Me, so the song may be an homage to a departed friend. Danko thought Dylan changed the title from Richard to Homer because Richard was already there—in the shape of Richard Manuel.

"The song lopes along jauntily", writes Gill, "tendering obscure bits of baffling advice, some common sense, others with the cryptic power of folk remedies: value your memories properly, they won't come again; flush out your house if you don't want to be housing flushes; swim a certain way if you want to live off the fat of the land; and forgive the sick before you try to heal them. The sensible ones lend a sort of bogus credence to the less sensible". In Shelton's description, "Despite its light source, agony tempers the joy, contrasting not only Dylan's conflicts but also his ability to grow despite holding opposing ideas and impulses in his mind."

=== "Long Distance Operator" ===
Manuel – vocal, harmonica; Robertson – guitar; John Simon – piano; Hudson – organ; Danko – bass; Helm – drums. Recorded in Los Angeles, February 28, 1968.

This song was written by Dylan, and he had performed it as early as December 4, 1965, at a concert in Berkeley, California—soon after the Hawks had started to back him on his rock and roll tour. Dylan and the Band ran through this number in Woodstock in 1967, although the Basement Tapes version is an outtake from the 1968 Music from Big Pink sessions. Gill calls it "half an idea fleshed out to a riff" that is a funky blues extension of the classic Chuck Berry song "Memphis, Tennessee". The released version has had one verse cut; a longer version of the same take appears as a bonus track on the 2000 reissue of Music from Big Pink.

=== "This Wheel's on Fire" ===
Dylan – vocal, guitar; Hudson – organ; Manuel – piano, backing vocal; Danko – bass, backing vocal; Robertson – drums. Overdubbed 1975: Robertson – acoustic guitar.

"This Wheel's On Fire" closes the album "at a peak of sinister mystery", according to Gill, who suggests that it brings the record back to the motorcycle crash that created the circumstances for The Basement Tapes: "It is virtually impossible not to see the locked wheel of Dylan's Triumph 500 in the title, the very wheel upon which his own accelerating pursuit of disaster was borne so swiftly, and then arrested so abruptly. The verses brim with unfinished business, anchored by the certainty that 'we shall meet again'."

Both Gill and Shelton suggest that Dylan's lyric again draws upon Shakespeare's King Lear, echoing Lear's tormented words to his daughter: "Thou art a soul in bliss; but I am bound/Upon a wheel of fire, that mine own tears/Do scald like molten lead" (act IV, scene 7). Shelton describes how the song builds firmly through a series of tension-and-release peaks, and he connects the central image to the prophet Ezekiel's vision of a chariot that is recounted in the black spiritual "Ezekiel Saw the Wheel".
