= Ophelia (The Band song) =

Song performed by the Band

- Japanese single cover

Single by the Band

from the album Northern Lights – Southern Cross
- B-side: "Hobo Jungle"
- Recorded: 1975
- Genre: Roots rock; Americana
- Length: 3:32
- Label: Capitol Records
- Songwriter(s): Robbie Robertson
- Producer(s): The Band

"Ophelia" is a song written by Robbie Robertson that was first released by The Band on their 1975 album Northern Lights – Southern Cross. It was the lead single from the album. It has also appeared on several of the group's live and compilation albums, and has been covered by such artists as Vince Gill and My Morning Jacket.

== Lyrics and music ==
The lyrics tell of the singer's attempt to find the heroine Ophelia. The relationship between the singer and Ophelia is never made explicit. Author Craig Harris refers to her as the singer's old friend, while music critic Nick DeRiso considers her his lover. But he finds out that Ophelia has left town, apparently in a hurry. According to Band biographer Barney Hoskyns, the name Ophelia for the song did not come from Shakespeare's Hamlet but rather from Minnie Pearl's real name. But Shakespeare scholar Stephen M. Buhler sees some Shakespearean echoes in "Ophelia," particularly related to Othello. In particular, Buhler sees hints that perhaps Ophelia is a black woman in a Southern town who was forced to flee because of Southern attitudes at the time towards interracial relationships with the white singer. Lyrics Buhler uses to support this view include the following, suggesting that the relationship between Ophelia and the singer was illegal:

Honey, you know we broke the rule
Was somebody up against the law?

Lines such as the singer asking Ophelia to "please darken my door," suggest to Buhler that the issue may be the color of Ophelia's skin. But according to Harris' interpretation, nostalgia is the key theme to the song.

"Ophelia" is an uptempo song with similarities to earlier Band songs "The W.S. Walcott Medicine Show" from Stage Fright and "Life Is a Carnival" from Cahoots. The song has a Dixieland flavor. DeRiso hears a combination of rustic and modern elements in the music. Levon Helm sings the lead vocal. According to Hoskyns, the song has "the same good-humoured regret with which [Helm] infused "Up on Cripple Creek." Garth Hudson plays multiple instruments, including synthesizer and multiple brass and woodwind instruments, which contributes significantly to the Dixieland flavor. As a result of the success of Hudson's playing, DeRiso regards "Ophelia" as "Hudson's triumph, his musical testament, his masterpiece." Robertson plays a more prominent guitar part than he had typically played on earlier Band songs.

According to Robertson, "The chord progression on 'Ophelia' was something that could have come out of the 1930s. The storytelling was ancient and modern in the same breath. The full-on modernism in the sound, in the arrangement, was paramount in Garth’s experimentation. It is unquestionably one of his greatest feats, in my opinion, on any Band song."

== Personnel ==
Credits are adapted from the liner notes of A Musical History.

- Rick Danko – bass guitar
- Levon Helm – lead vocals, drums
- Garth Hudson – Lowrey organ, synthesizer, brass, woodwinds
- Richard Manuel – Hammond organ, backing vocals
- Robbie Robertson – electric guitar

== Reception ==
According to The New Rolling Stone Album Guide critic Mark Kemp, "Ophelia" is one of three songs on Northern Lights – Southern Cross, along with "Acadian Driftwood" and "It Makes No Difference," on which "Robertson reclaims his reputation as one of rock's great songwriters." Cash Box called it a "funky shuffle in the Band's best found-and-lost woman tradition," and said "Levon Helm's floppy drums kick the piece along, and his vocal is impeccably mournful" and that "Robbie Robertson plays an absolutely steaming guitar solo." Record World called it "a festive sounding tune chock full of Bayou funk."

== Other appearances ==
"Ophelia" appeared on many Band live and compilation albums. It appeared on the compilations albums The Best of the Band (1976), To Kingdom Come: The Definitive Collection (1989) and Greatest Hits (2000). It was also included on the box sets Across the Great Divide (1994) and A Musical History (2005). A live version was included in the film and album versions of The Last Waltz Another live version was included on Live in Tokyo 1983.

My Morning Jacket covered "Ophelia" on the 2013 tribute album Love for Levon. Vince Gill covered the song on the soundtrack to the 1994 film Maverick. ALO also recorded a version for the bonus disc to the 2007 tribute album Endless Highway: The Music of the Band.

"Ophelia" was one of the songs performed during the first (and so far only) live performance by Dr. Teeth and the Electric Mayhem at the Outside Lands Festival in 2016.

"Ophelia" was also recorded by Texas singer/songwriter Randy Brown and released on his 2007 album Hard Face to Face.

"Ophelia" is featured on the Gibson Brothers' 2006 album Long Way Back Home.

Widespread Panic covers the song regularly.
