= Lance Anderson (disambiguation) =

Lance Anderson is an American makeup artist.

Lance Anderson may also refer to:

- Lance Anderson, music producer on Live at the Wolf
- Lance Anderson, co-founder of Newsvine
- Lance Anderson (American football) (born 1971), American football coach
