= Hey Boy =

Hey Boy may refer to:

== Film ==
- Hey Boy (film), a 1948 Italian film
- Hey Boy (character), a character in the TV show Have Gun - Will Travel

== Music ==
=== Songs ===
- "Hey Boy" (Teddybears song), later covered by Polish group Blog 27 as "Hey Boy (Get Your Ass Up)"
- "Hey Boy" (Take That song)
- "Hey Boy!" (Kim-Lian song)
- "Hey Boy" (Sia song), 2020 single
- "Hey Boy", a song by Heidi Montag from the album Superficial
- "Hey Boy", a song by the Blow from the album Poor Aim: Love Songs
- "Hey Boy", a song by The Spiders (Japanese band)
- "Hey Boy", a song by Celeste (singer)
- "Hey Boy", a song by Brenda & the Tabulations
- "Hey Boy", a song by Lesley Duncan, 1966
- "Hey Boy", a song by Barry St. John
- "Hey Boy", a song by Magic Kids, 2009
- "Hey Boy", a song by Paul London (singer)
- "Hey Boy", a song by Tina Charles (singer)
- "Hey Boy Hey Girl", a single released by the Chemical Brothers
