= Look Out Cleveland =

Song by The Band

from the album The Band
- Released: September 22, 1969
- Length: 3:09
- Label: Capitol
- Songwriter: Robbie Robertson
- Producer: John Simon

"Look Out Cleveland" is the title of the Robbie Robertson-written song on The Band's self-titled album, also known as The Brown Album. The song begins with a boogie-woogie blues riff by pianist Richard Manuel followed by lead singer Rick Danko warning -- "Look out Cleveland, storm is coming through, And it’s runnin’ right up on you". The song's reference is presumably to Cleveland, Ohio, but Cleveland, Texas has also been suggested.

"Look Out Cleveland" differs from most of the songs on The Band's first two albums in that is more influenced by urban blues music than by rural music. According to music critic Nick DeRiso, Elton John's early song "Take Me to the Pilot" appears to be influenced by this song.

== Soundtrack listing ==
"Look Out Cleveland" is featured in the movie A Home at the End of the World, a film adaptation of the novel of the same name by Michael Cunningham. In the film, the song is used in a scene where the two main characters (played by Colin Farrell and Dallas Roberts), are singing along to the song while riding a truck.

== Cover versions ==
The song was covered by Albert Lee on his album "That's Alright Mama."

Blues artist Jackie Greene covered the song for Endless Highway: The Music of The Band, a 2007 tribute album to The Band.

Phish opened their show at Blossom Music Center in Cuyahoga Falls, OH, on June 12, 2010, with "Look Out Cleveland".

Charlie Robison covered the song on his 2013 album "High Life".

The Cold Irons, a band in Austin, Texas, have played “Look Out Cleveland” at every gig they have played since they formed in 2011.

Goose covered it on their 2021 live album 2020.10.03 Swanzey, NH.

== Personnel ==
- Rick Danko – lead vocal, bass guitar
- Levon Helm – drums, backing vocal
- Garth Hudson – Lowrey organ
- Richard Manuel – piano
- Robbie Robertson – electric guitar
