= Rusty Nail =

Rusty Nail or Rusty nail often refers to:

- Literally, a nail (fastener) covered in rust
- Rusty nail (cocktail), Scotch and Drambuie

The terms may also refer to:

== People ==
- Rusty Nails (filmmaker), a film director
- Rusty Nails, a children's entertainer who inspired The Simpsons character Krusty the Clown

== Arts, entertainment, and media ==
- Ron Hawkins and the Rusty Nails, a Canadian rock band
- Rusty Nails (album), by Jackie Greene
- "Rusty Nail" (song), by metal band X Japan
- "Rusty Nail", a song by groove metal band Grip Inc.
- Rusty Nails, an EP by Moderat
- Rusty Nail, the villain of the film Joy Ride (2001) and its two sequels, portrayed by actor Ted Levine
- "The Rusty Nail", an episode of Greek
