= The Basement Tapes =

Studio album by Bob Dylan and the Band
- Released: June 26, 1975
- Recorded: June–September 1967 (Dylan and the Band): 1967–1968 (The Band); 1975 (overdubs)
- Genres: Roots rock; Americana; alternative country
- Length: 76:41
- Label: Columbia
- Producers: Bob Dylan; The Band

Bob Dylan chronology
Blood on the Tracks (1975)	The Basement Tapes (1975)	Desire (1976)

The Band chronology
Before the Flood (1974)	The Basement Tapes (1975)	Northern Lights – Southern Cross (1975)

Singles from The Basement Tapes
- 1. "Million Dollar Bash" Released: September 1975

The Basement Tapes is the sixteenth studio album by the American singer-songwriter Bob Dylan and his second with the Band. It was released on June 26, 1975, by Columbia Records. Two-thirds of the album's 24 tracks feature Dylan on lead vocals backed by the Band, and were recorded in 1967, eight years before the album's release, in the lapse between the release of Blonde on Blonde and the subsequent recording and release of John Wesley Harding, during sessions that began at Dylan's house in Woodstock, New York, then moved to the basement of a house nicknamed Big Pink. While most of these songs had appeared on bootleg albums, The Basement Tapes marked their first official release. The remaining eight songs, all previously unavailable, feature the Band without Dylan and were recorded between 1967 and 1975.

During his 1965–1966 world tour, Dylan was backed by the Hawks, a five-member rock group who would later become famous as the Band. After Dylan was injured in a motorcycle accident in July 1966, four members of the Hawks came to Dylan's home in the Woodstock area to collaborate with him on music and film projects. While Dylan was out of the public's eye during an extended period of recovery in 1967, he and the members of the Hawks recorded more than 100 tracks together, incorporating original compositions, contemporary covers, and traditional material. Dylan's new style of writing moved away from the urban sensibility and extended narratives that had characterized his most recent albums, Highway 61 Revisited and Blonde on Blonde, toward songs that were more intimate and which drew on many styles of traditional American music. While some of the basement songs are humorous, others dwell on nothingness, betrayal and a quest for salvation. In general, they possess a rootsy quality anticipating the Americana genre. For some critics, the songs on The Basement Tapes, which circulated widely in unofficial form, mounted a major stylistic challenge to rock music in the late sixties.

When Columbia Records prepared the album for official release in 1975, eight songs recorded solely by the Band—in various locations between 1967 and 1975—were added to 16 songs taped by Dylan and the Band in 1967. Overdubs were added in 1975 to songs from both categories. The Basement Tapes was critically acclaimed upon release, reaching number seven on the Billboard Top LPs & Tape album chart. However, the release led some critics to question the omission of some of Dylan's best-known 1967 compositions and the inclusion of material by the Band that was not recorded in Woodstock.

== Background and recording ==
By July 1966, Bob Dylan was at the peak of both creative and commercial success. Highway 61 Revisited had reached number three on the US album chart in November 1965; the recently released double-LP Blonde on Blonde was widely acclaimed. From September 1965 to May 1966, Dylan embarked on an extensive tour across the US, Australia and Europe backed by the Hawks, a band that had formerly worked with rock and roll musician Ronnie Hawkins. The Hawks comprised four Canadian musicians—Rick Danko, Garth Hudson, Richard Manuel and Robbie Robertson—and one American, Levon Helm. Dylan's audiences reacted with hostility to the sound of their folk icon backed by a rock band. Dismayed by the negative reception, Helm quit the Hawks in November 1965 and drifted around the South, at one point working on an oil rig in the Gulf of Mexico. The tour culminated in a famously raucous concert in Manchester, England, in May 1966 when an audience member shouted "Judas!" at Dylan for allegedly betraying the cause of politically progressive folk music. (Note: For his detailed account of the Manchester concert, C. P. Lee interviewed members of the audience about the reasons for their hostility. One explained, "It was as if everything we held dear had been betrayed. He showed us what to think, I know that's a stupid thing to say but there he was marching with Martin Luther King, and suddenly he was singing this stuff about himself. We made him and he betrayed the cause" (Lee 1998, p. 154).) Returning exhausted from the hectic schedule of his world tour, Dylan discovered that his manager, Albert Grossman, had arranged a further 63 concerts across the US that year.

=== Motorcycle crash ===
On July 29, 1966, Dylan crashed his Triumph motorcycle near his home in Woodstock, New York, suffering cracked vertebrae and a mild concussion. The concerts he was scheduled to perform had to be cancelled. Biographer Clinton Heylin wrote in 1990 on the significance of the crash: "A quarter of a century on, Dylan's motorcycle accident is still viewed as the pivot of his career. As a sudden, abrupt moment when his wheel really did explode. The great irony is that 1967—the year after the accident—remains his most prolific year as a songwriter." In a 1969 Rolling Stone interview with Jann Wenner, Dylan said, "I had a dreadful motorcycle accident which put me away for a while, and I still didn't sense the importance of that accident till at least a year after that. I realized that it was a real accident. I mean I thought that I was just gonna get up and go back to doing what I was doing before ... but I couldn't do it anymore."

Dylan was rethinking the direction of his life while recovering from a sense of having been exploited. Nine months after the crash, he told New York Daily News reporter Michael Iachetta, "Songs are in my head like they always are. And they're not going to get written down until some things are evened up. Not until some people come forth and make up for some of the things that have happened." After discussing the crash with Dylan, biographer Robert Shelton concluded that he "was saying there must be another way of life for the pop star, in which he is in control, not they. He had to find ways of working to his own advantage with the recording industry. He had to come to terms with his one-time friend, longtime manager, part-time neighbor, and sometime landlord, Albert Grossman."

=== Early recordings ===
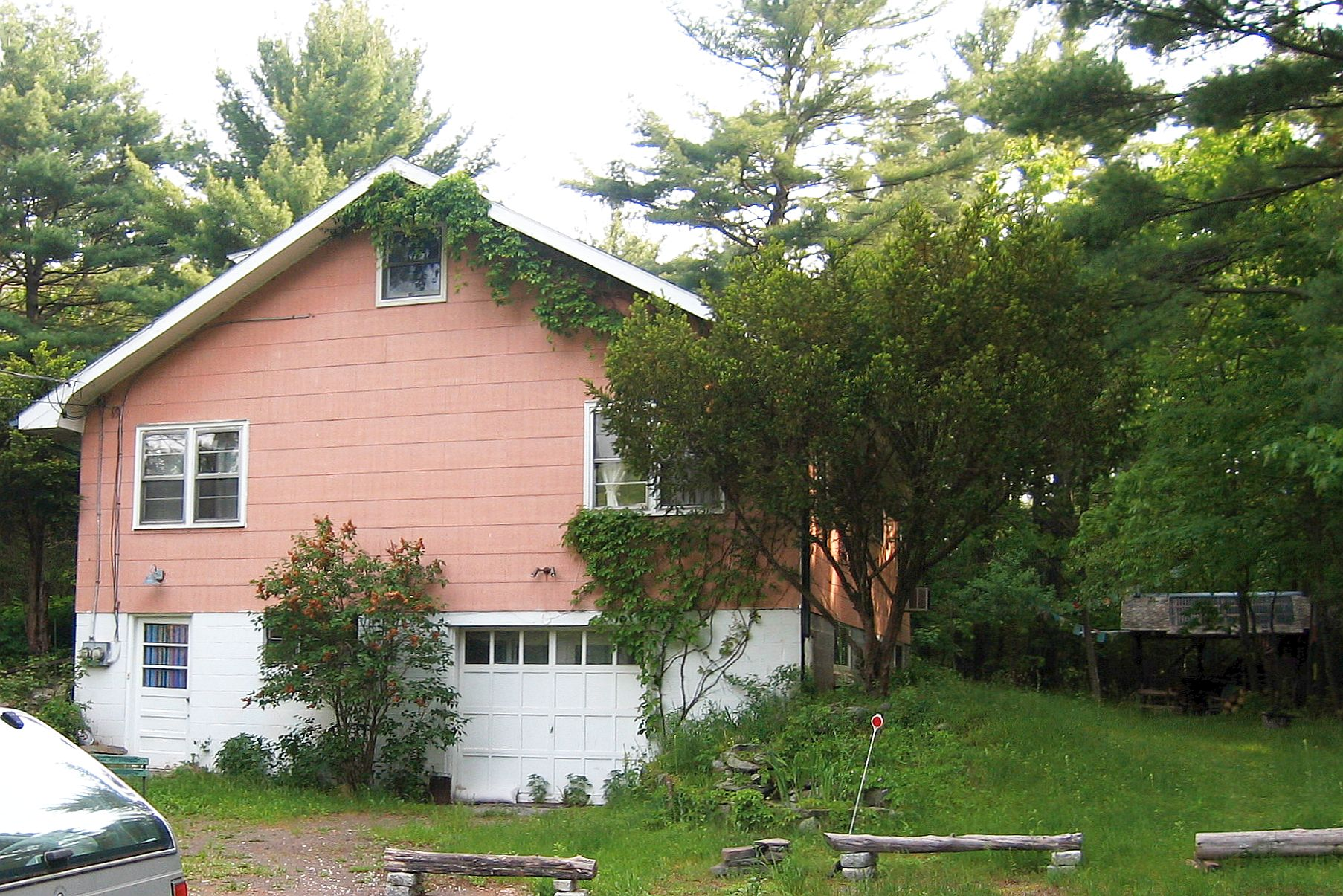
Big Pink, West Saugerties, New York (2006)

Rick Danko recalled that he, Richard Manuel and Garth Hudson joined Robbie Robertson in West Saugerties, a few miles from Woodstock, in February 1967. The three of them moved into a house on Stoll Road nicknamed "Big Pink"; Robertson lived nearby with his future wife, Dominique. Danko and Manuel had been invited to Woodstock to collaborate with Dylan on a film he was editing, Eat the Document, a rarely seen account of Dylan's 1966 world tour. At some point between March and June 1967, Dylan and the four Hawks began a series of informal recording sessions, initially at the so-called Red Room of Dylan's house, Hi Lo Ha, in the Byrdcliffe area of Woodstock. In June, the recording sessions moved to the basement of Big Pink. Hudson set up a recording unit, using two stereo mixers and a tape recorder borrowed from Grossman, as well as a set of microphones on loan from the folk trio Peter, Paul and Mary. Dylan would later tell Jann Wenner, "That's really the way to do a recording—in a peaceful, relaxed setting—in somebody's basement. With the windows open ... and a dog lying on the floor."

For the first couple of months, they were merely "killing time", according to Robertson, with many early sessions devoted to covers. "With the covers Bob was educating us a little", recalls Robertson. "The whole folkie thing was still very questionable to us—it wasn't the train we came in on. ... He'd come up with something like 'Royal Canal', (Note: Robertson is referring to "Banks of the Royal Canal (The Auld Triangle)" by Brendan Behan, one of the basement recordings that was bootlegged but never officially released until 2014's The Bootleg Series Vol. 11: The Basement Tapes Complete. The song first appeared in Behan's play The Quare Fellow, and Dylan probably learned it from Liam Clancy, who recorded it in 1965 (Barker 2008, pp. 303–305).) and you'd say, 'This is so beautiful! The expression!' ... He remembered too much, remembered too many songs too well. He'd come over to Big Pink, or wherever we were, and pull out some old song—and he'd prepped for this. He'd practiced this, and then come out here, to show us." Songs recorded at the early sessions included material written or made popular by Johnny Cash, Ian & Sylvia, John Lee Hooker, Hank Williams and Eric Von Schmidt, as well as traditional songs and standards. Linking all the recordings, both new material and old, is the way in which Dylan re-engaged with traditional American music. Biographer Barney Hoskyns observed that both the seclusion of Woodstock and the discipline and sense of tradition in the Hawks' musicianship were just what Dylan needed after the "globe-trotting psychosis" of the 1965–66 tour.

=== New compositions ===
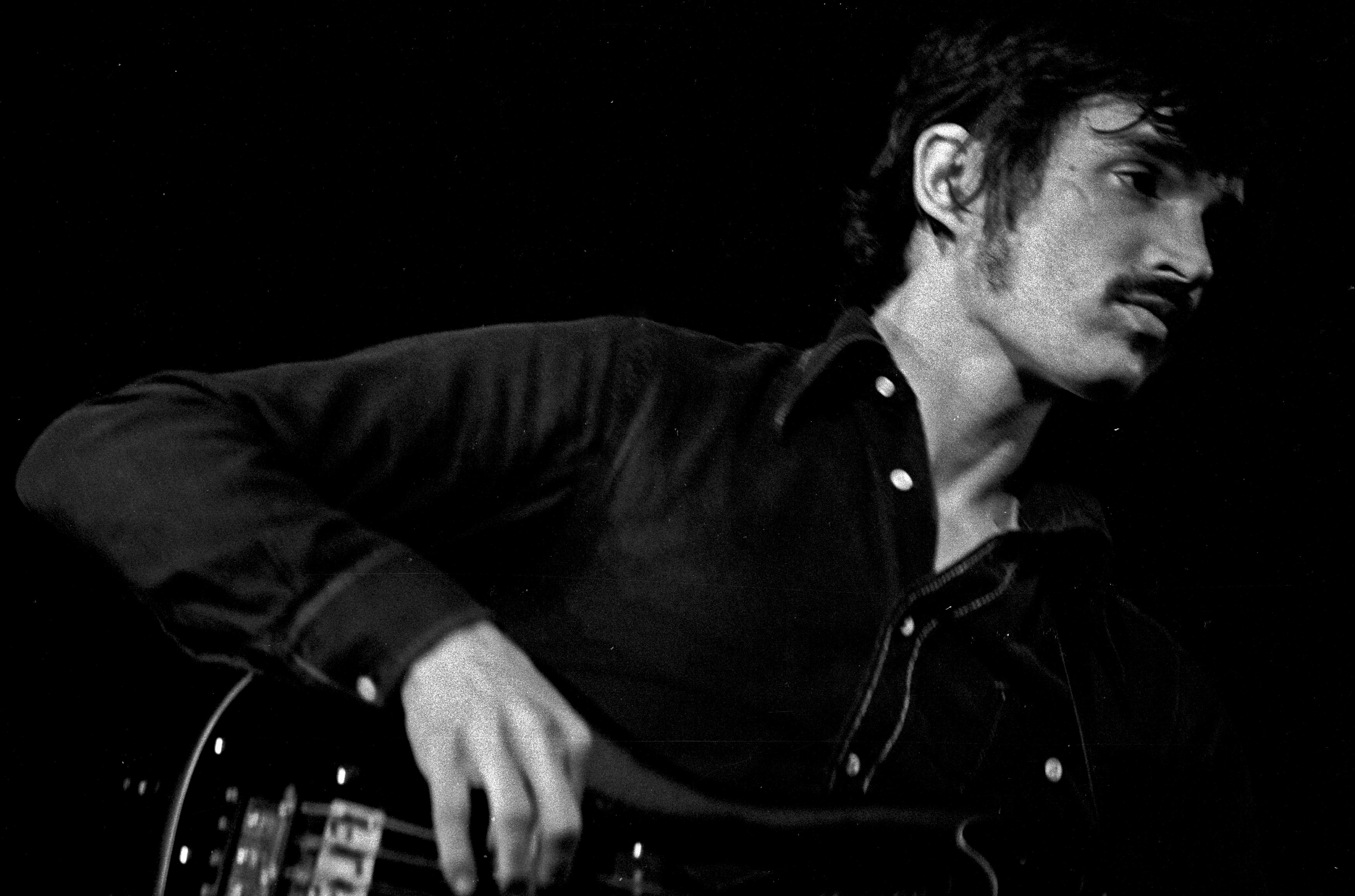
Bassist Rick Danko co-wrote "This Wheel's on Fire" with Dylan.

Dylan began to write and record new material at the sessions. According to Hudson, "We were doing seven, eight, ten, sometimes fifteen songs a day. Some were old ballads and traditional songs ... but others Bob would make up as he went along. ... We'd play the melody, he'd sing a few words he'd written, and then make up some more, or else just mouth sounds or even syllables as he went along. It's a pretty good way to write songs." Danko told Dylan biographer Howard Sounes, "Bob and Robbie, they would come by every day, five to seven days a week, for seven to eight months." Hudson added, "It amazed me, Bob's writing ability. How he would come in, sit down at the typewriter, and write a song. And what was amazing was that almost every one of those songs was funny."

Dylan recorded around thirty new compositions with the Hawks, including some of the most celebrated songs of his career: "I Shall Be Released", "This Wheel's on Fire", "Quinn the Eskimo (The Mighty Quinn)", "Tears of Rage" and "You Ain't Goin' Nowhere". Two of these featured his lyrics set to music by members of the Band: Danko wrote the music of "This Wheel's on Fire"; Manuel, who composed "Tears of Rage", described how Dylan "came down to the basement with a piece of typewritten paper ... and he just said, 'Have you got any music for this?' ... I had a couple of musical movements that fit ... so I just elaborated a bit, because I wasn't sure what the lyrics meant. I couldn't run upstairs and say, 'What's this mean, Bob: "Now the heart is filled with gold as if it was a purse"?'"

One of the qualities of The Basement Tapes that sets it apart from contemporaneous works is its simple, down-to-earth sound. The songs were recorded in mid-1967, during the "Summer of Love", the peak of the psychedelic era. In a 1978 interview, Dylan reflected on the period: "I didn't know how to record the way other people were recording, and I didn't want to. The Beatles had just released Sgt. Pepper which I didn't like at all. I thought that was a very indulgent album, though the songs on it were real good. I didn't think all that production was necessary." Of the sound and atmosphere of the basement recordings, Barney Hoskyns wrote that "Big Pink itself determined the nature of this homemade brew." "One of the things is that if you played loud in the basement, it was really annoying, because it was a cement-walled room", recalled Robertson. "So we played in a little huddle: if you couldn't hear the singing, you were playing too loud."

Mike Marqusee describes how the basement recordings represented a radical change of direction for Dylan, who turned his back on his reputation for importing avant-garde ideas into popular culture: "At the very moment when avant-gardism was sweeping through new cultural corridors, Dylan decided to dismount. The dandified, aggressively modern surface was replaced by a self-consciously unassuming and traditional garb. The giddiness embodied, celebrated, dissected in the songs of the mid-sixties had left him exhausted. He sought safety in a retreat to the countryside that was also a retreat in time, or more precisely, a search for timelessness."

"Apple Suckling Tree"
Greil Marcus calls the song a "half-written ditty about almost nothing but a country beat that swings and a drawl that would be at home anywhere in the South any time in the last couple of centuries." Comparing this second take of the song to the first, never officially released, he writes, "The group is looking for that beat, the second time through the tune they find it, they push it".

Dylan had married Sara Lownds in November 1965. By the time the basement sessions started in Big Pink around June 1967, he had two children: Maria (Sara's daughter from her first marriage) and Jesse Dylan. Anna Dylan was born on July 11, 1967. Both Heylin and biographer Sid Griffin suggest that recording had to move from Dylan's home to Big Pink when it became clear that the sessions were getting in the way of family life. Domesticity was the context of The Basement Tapes, as Hudson said in The Last Waltz: "Chopping wood and hitting your thumb with a hammer, fixing the tape recorder or the screen door, wandering off into the woods with Hamlet [the dog Dylan shared with the Band] ... it was relaxed and low-key, which was something we hadn't enjoyed since we were children." Several Basement Tapes songs, such as "Clothes Line Saga" and "Apple Suckling Tree", celebrate the domestic aspects of the rural lifestyle.

The intense collaboration between Dylan and the Hawks that produced the basement recordings came to an end in October 1967 when Dylan relocated to Nashville to record a formal studio album, John Wesley Harding, with a different crew of accompanying musicians. The same month, drummer Levon Helm rejoined his former bandmates in Woodstock, after he received a phone call from Danko informing him that they were getting ready to record as a group. (Note: Griffin writes that Helm's arrival in October meant that he did not play on most of the Dylan–Band 1967 Woodstock recordings, including the sixteen Dylan Basement Tapes album tracks—and it is unclear whether the drums overdubbed on "Too Much of Nothing" in 1975 were played by Helm. Griffin believes Helm drummed on eight unreleased recordings made by Dylan and the Band in the house on Wittenberg Road that Danko and Helm shared after vacating Big Pink (Griffin 2007, pp. 201, 221, 236–241). Heylin has suggested that Helm might be the drummer on four tracks on The Basement Tapes: "Odds and Ends", "Clothes Line Saga", "Apple Suckling Tree" and "Goin' to Acapulco" (Heylin 2009, pp. 376–381).) In his autobiography, Helm recalled how he listened to the recordings the Hawks had made with Dylan and remembered that he "could tell that hanging out with the boys had helped Bob to find a connection with things we were interested in: blues, rockabilly, R&B. They had rubbed off on him a little."

== Dwarf Music demos and Great White Wonder ==
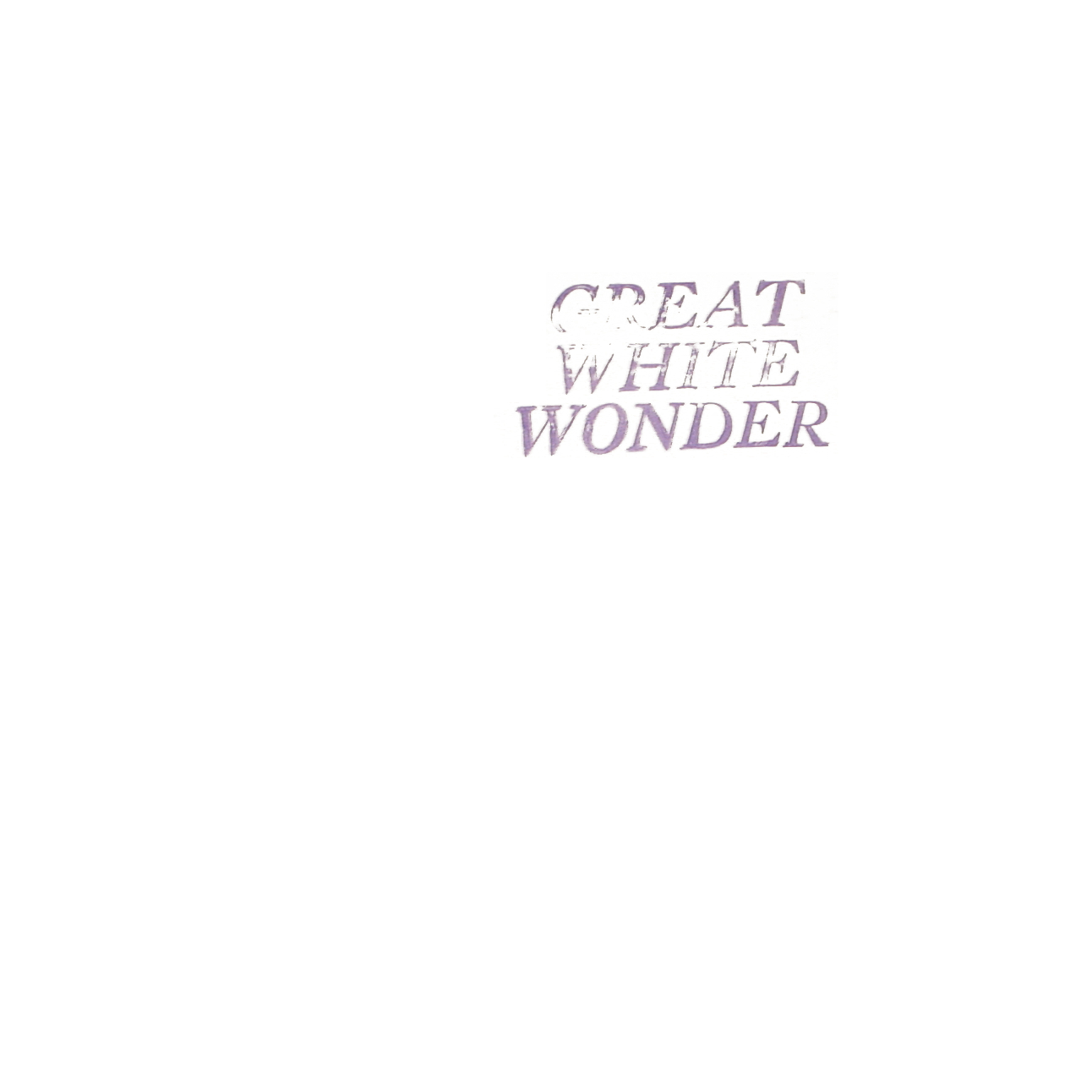
The bootleg Great White Wonder featured many of the songs recorded for The Basement Tapes—its release and popularity created demand for the official album

Dylan referred to commercial pressures behind the basement recordings in a 1969 interview with Rolling Stone: "They weren't demos for myself, they were demos of the songs. I was being PUSHED again into coming up with some songs. You know how those things go." In October 1967, a fourteen-song demo tape was copyrighted and the compositions were registered with Dwarf Music, a publishing company jointly owned by Dylan and Grossman. Acetates and tapes of the songs then circulated among interested recording artists. (Note: The songs on the demo were: "Million Dollar Bash", "Yea! Heavy and a Bottle of Bread", "Please Mrs. Henry", "Down in the Flood", "Lo and Behold", "Tiny Montgomery", "This Wheel's on Fire", "You Ain't Goin' Nowhere", "I Shall Be Released", "Tears of Rage", "Too Much of Nothing", "The Mighty Quinn", "Open the Door, Homer" and "Nothing Was Delivered" (Griffin 2007, pp. 229–230).)

Peter, Paul and Mary, managed by Grossman, had the first hit with a basement composition when their cover of "Too Much of Nothing" reached number 35 on the Billboard chart in late 1967. Ian & Sylvia, also managed by Grossman, recorded "Tears of Rage", "Quinn the Eskimo" and "This Wheel's on Fire". In January 1968, Manfred Mann reached number one on the UK singles chart with their recording of "The Mighty Quinn". In April, "This Wheel's on Fire", recorded by Julie Driscoll with Brian Auger and the Trinity, hit number five on the UK chart. That same month, a version of "You Ain't Goin' Nowhere" by the Byrds was issued as a single. Along with "Nothing Was Delivered", it appeared on their country-rock album Sweetheart of the Rodeo, released in August. The Hawks, officially renamed the Band, (Note: When Albert Grossman was shopping around for a recording contract for the Hawks in late 1967, the group instructed him to sign them under the name The Crackers—a derogatory term for poor white Southerners. The Band also mischievously dubbed themselves The Honkies. It was only when Helm joined them in Woodstock that they settled on calling themselves the Band (Hoskyns 1993, pp. 143–144).) recorded "This Wheel's on Fire", "I Shall Be Released" and "Tears of Rage" for their debut album, Music from Big Pink, released in July 1968. Fairport Convention covered "Million Dollar Bash" on their 1969 album Unhalfbricking.

As tapes of Dylan's recordings circulated in the music industry, journalists became aware of their existence. In June 1968, Jann Wenner wrote a front-page Rolling Stone story headlined "Dylan's Basement Tape Should Be Released". Wenner listened to the fourteen-song demo and reported, "There is enough material—most all of it very good—to make an entirely new Bob Dylan album, a record with a distinct style of its own." He concluded, "Even though Dylan used one of the finest rock and roll bands ever assembled on the Highway 61 album, here he works with his own band for the first time. Dylan brings that instinctual feel for rock and roll to his voice for the first time. If this were ever to be released it would be a classic."

Reporting such as this whetted the appetites of Dylan fans. In July 1969, the first rock bootleg appeared in California, entitled Great White Wonder. The double album consisted of seven songs from the Woodstock basement sessions, plus some early recordings Dylan had made in Minneapolis in December 1961 and one track recorded from The Johnny Cash Show. One of those responsible for the bootleg, identified only as Patrick, talked to Rolling Stone: "Dylan is a heavy talent and he's got all those songs nobody's ever heard. We thought we'd take it upon ourselves to make this music available." The process of bootlegging Dylan's work would eventually see the illegal release of hundreds of live and studio recordings, and lead the Recording Industry Association of America to describe Dylan as the most bootlegged artist in the history of the music industry.

== Release ==
In January 1975, Dylan unexpectedly gave permission for the release of a selection of the basement recordings, perhaps because he and Grossman had resolved their legal dispute over the Dwarf Music copyrights on his songs. Clinton Heylin argues that Dylan was able to consent following the critical and commercial success of his album Blood on the Tracks, released that same month: "After Blood on the Tracks, The Basement Tapes no longer had the status of a final reminder of Dylan's lost genius". In 1975, as well, the Band purchased Shangri-La ranch in Malibu, California, which they transformed into their recording studio.

Engineer Rob Fraboni was brought to Shangri-La to clean up the recordings still in the possession of Hudson, the original engineer. Fraboni had worked on Dylan's Planet Waves album, with backing by the Band, and the live Dylan–Band album Before the Flood, both released in 1974. Fraboni has described Robertson as the dominant voice in selecting the final tracks for The Basement Tapes and reported that Dylan was not in the studio very often. The stereo recordings made by Hudson were remixed to mono, while Robertson and other members of the Band overdubbed new keyboard, guitar, and drum parts onto some of the 1967 Woodstock recordings. According to Fraboni, four new songs by the Band were also recorded in preparation for the album's official release, one of which, a cover of Chuck Berry's "Going Back to Memphis", did not end up being included. There is disagreement about the recording date of the other three songs: "Bessie Smith", "Ain't No More Cane" and "Don't Ya Tell Henry". While Fraboni has recalled that the Band taped them in 1975, the liner notes for the reissued versions of the Band's own albums state that these songs were recorded between 1967 and 1970. Ultimately, eight of the twenty-four songs on The Basement Tapes did not feature Dylan, several of the studio outtakes postdating the sessions at Big Pink. In justifying their inclusion, Robertson explained that he, Hudson and Dylan did not have access to all the basement recordings: "We had access to some of the songs. Some of these things came under the heading of 'homemade' which meant a Basement Tape to us." Robertson has suggested that the Basement Tapes are, for him, "a process, a homemade feel" and so could include recordings from a wide variety of sources. "The idea," he said, "was to record some demos for other people. They were never intended to be a record, never meant to be presented. It was somewhat annoying that the songs were bootlegged. The album was finally released in the spirit of 'well, if this is going to be documented, let's at least make it good quality.'"

=== Cover art ===
The art director/design consultant credited on the 1975 album was Bob Cato. The cover photograph for the 1975 album was taken by designer and photographer Reid Miles in the basement of a Los Angeles YMCA. It poses Dylan and the Band alongside characters suggested by the songs: a woman in a Mrs. Henry T-shirt, an Eskimo, a circus strongman and a dwarf who has been identified as Angelo Rossitto. Robertson wears a blue Mao-style suit, and Manuel wears an RAF flight lieutenant uniform. Michael Gray has identified musicians David Blue and Neil Young in the photograph. The identification of Young has been disputed by Bill Scheele who has written that Young was not present. Bill Scheele and his brother John Scheele worked with the Band from 1969 until 1976 and were present in the cover photo. Some photos by John Scheele of the 1975 Hollywood YMCA photo shoot were included in the book accompanying the 2014 release The Bootleg Series Vol. 11: The Basement Tapes Complete which was digitally mastered by Peter J. Moore for which he won the Grammy Award for Best Historical Album in February 2016.

=== Reception and sales ===
Professional ratings
Retrospective reviews
Review scores
Source	Rating
AllMusic	5/5 stars
Chicago Tribune	4/4 stars
Christgau's Record Guide	A+
Encyclopedia of Popular Music	4/5 stars
Entertainment Weekly	A
PopMatters	9/10
The Rolling Stone Album Guide	5/5 stars
Tom Hull	A−

Columbia Records released The Basement Tapes on June 26, 1975. The album peaked at number seven on the Billboard Top LPs & Tape chart, and reached number eight in the UK. It was acclaimed by critics. John Rockwell of The New York Times hailed it as "one of the greatest albums in the history of American popular music." Rolling Stone's Paul Nelson called its contents "the hardest, toughest, sweetest, saddest, funniest, wisest songs I know". The review in The Washington Post declared, "He may perplex, irritate, and disappoint, but Dylan has to rank as the single greatest artist modern American pop music has produced." The Basement Tapes topped the Voice's Pazz & Jop Critics Poll. Robert Christgau, the poll's creator and supervisor, said the recordings sounded richer and stranger in 1975 than when they were made and concluded, "We don't have to bow our heads in shame because this is the best album of 1975. It would have been the best album of 1967, too."

== Criticism of 1975 album ==
Criticism of the 1975 official release of The Basement Tapes has centered on two issues: the recordings by the Band on their own, and the selection of the Dylan songs. In his book about the basement sessions, Greil Marcus describes the album's contents as "sixteen basement recordings plus eight Band demos". Critic Michael Gray writes of the album, "The interspersed tracks by the Band alone merely disrupt the unity of Dylan material, much more of which should have been included. Key songs missing here include 'I Shall Be Released' and 'The Mighty Quinn'". Heylin similarly argues that compiler Robbie Robertson did Dylan fans "a major disservice" by omitting those two songs as well as "I'm Not There" and "Sign on the Cross". He writes, "The album as released hardly gave a real idea of what they had been doing in Woodstock. Not even the two traditional songs pulled to the master reels—'Young But Daily Growin' and 'The Banks Of The Royal Canal'—made the final twenty-four cuts." Sasha Frere-Jones of The New Yorker, on the other hand, said of the 1975 release that, in comparison to the complete recordings released in 2011, "Robertson, with some exceptions, knew which the good songs were" and was right to clean up the recordings.

The authenticity of the 1975 album was questioned by a reviewer of the remastered version of the Band's Music from Big Pink, issued in 2000. Dave Hopkins noted that "Katie's Been Gone", which appears as a bonus track on the Big Pink reissue, is the same recording that appeared on The Basement Tapes, but now "in stereo and with improved sound quality beyond what the remastering process alone would provide". Hopkins declared, "The cat's out of the bag: 'Katie' and the other Band-only tracks on The Basement Tapes must have been intentionally muddied in the studio in 1975 so that they would fit better alongside the Dylan material recorded in the basement with a home reel-to-reel." Heylin also takes exception to Robertson's passing off the Band's songs as originating from the basement sessions. By including eight Band recordings to Dylan's sixteen, he says, "Robertson sought to imply that the alliance between Dylan and the Band was far more equal than it was: 'Hey, we were writing all these songs, doing our own thing, oh and Bob would sometimes come around and we'd swap a few tunes.'" Heylin asserts that "though revealing in their own right, the Band tracks only pollute the official set and reduce its stature."

"Don't Ya Tell Henry"
With Helm singing "with characteristic Southern brio", Hudson's honky-tonk piano and Robertson's lead guitar, this track reflects the distinctive sound that the Band developed. This is one of several Band-only songs on the album whose recording history is disputed: Bowman dates it to late 1967 or early 1968, while Griffin lists it among the songs Fraboni says were recorded in 1975.

Barney Hoskyns describes "Heylin's objections [as] the academic ones of a touchy Dylanologist: The Basement Tapes still contained some of the greatest music either Dylan or the Band ever recorded." Sid Griffin similarly defends the inclusion of the Band's songs: "'Ain't No More Cane' may be included under false pretenses, but it is stirring stuff. ... And while a Dylan fan might understandably grumble that he wanted to hear another Bob song, a fan equally versed and interested more generally in late 20th-century American music would only smile and thank the Good Lord for the gift of this song." Of the Band's version of "Don't Ya Tell Henry", he writes, "True, the argument could be made that Robertson was way outside his brief in including this on the two-LP set, as this wasn't from Woodstock or '67, and has no Dylan on it. ... But it is a song from The Basement Tapes era and it swings like a randy sailor on shore leave in a bisexual bar. So give Robbie a break."

By 1975, Dylan showed scant interest in the discographical minutiae of the recordings. Interviewed on the radio by Mary Travers, he recalled, "We were all up there sorta drying out ... making music and watching time go by. So, in the meantime, we made this record. Actually, it wasn't a record, it was just songs which we'd come to this basement and recorded. Out in the woods ..." Heylin has commented that Dylan seemed to "dismiss the work as unfinished therapy".

== Themes ==
Although The Basement Tapes reached the public in an unorthodox manner, officially released eight years after the songs were recorded, critics have assigned them an important place in Dylan's development. Michael Gray writes, "The core Dylan songs from these sessions actually do form a clear link between ... two utterly different albums. They evince the same highly serious, precarious quest for a personal and universal salvation which marked out the John Wesley Harding collection—yet they are soaked in the same blocked confusion and turmoil as Blonde on Blonde. 'Tears of Rage', for example, is an exact halfway house between, say, 'One of Us Must Know (Sooner or Later)' and 'I Dreamed I Saw St. Augustine'".

Singer-songwriter David Gray commented that the great achievement of The Basement Tapes is that Dylan found a way out of the anguish and verbal complexity that had characterized his mid-sixties albums such as Blonde on Blonde: "It's the sound of Dylan letting his guard down. 'Clothes Line Saga' and all those ridiculous songs, he's obviously just making it all up, they were having such a great time. The sound of the Band is so antiquated like something out of the Gold Rush and Dylan fits in because he's this storyteller with an ancient heart. At the time everything he did was so scrutinized, yet somehow he liberated himself from all that and enjoyed making music again. You hear an unselfconscious quality on this record which you don't ever hear again." "He mocks his own inertia and impotence", writes critic Mike Marqusee, "but with a much gentler touch than in Blonde on Blonde. In place of that album's strangled urgency, Dylan adopts a laconic humor, a deadpan tone that speaks of resignation and self-preservation in the face of absurdity and betrayal."

Robert Shelton has argued that The Basement Tapes revolves around two sets of themes. One group of songs is "tinctured with the search for salvation": "I Shall Be Released" (on the demo, but not on the album), "Too Much of Nothing", "Nothing Was Delivered", "This Wheel's On Fire", "Tears of Rage" and "Goin' To Acapulco". "'Nothing' and 'nowhere' perplex and nag" in these songs, he writes. "The 'nothing' echoes the artist's dilemma: death versus life, vacuum versus harvest, isolation versus people, silence versus sound, the void versus the life-impulse." A second group, comprising "songs of joy, signaling some form of deliverance", includes most of the remaining songs in the collection.

"Open the Door, Homer"
Clinton Heylin suggests that in this song Dylan may have been invoking the memory of his recently deceased friend Richard Fariña, apparently nicknamed Homer. In his vocal delivery, Dylan "sounds like someone exorcising a certain kind of ghost".

In his sleeve notes for the 1975 release of The Basement Tapes, Greil Marcus wrote, "What was taking place as Dylan and the Band fiddled with the tunes, was less a style than a spirit—a spirit that had to do with a delight in friendship and invention." He compared the songs to fabled works of American music: "The Basement Tapes are a testing and a discovery of roots and memory ... they are no more likely to fade than Elvis Presley's 'Mystery Train' or Robert Johnson's 'Love In Vain.'"

In 1997, after listening to more than 100 basement recordings issued on various bootlegs, Marcus extended these insights into a book-length study, Invisible Republic (reissued in 2001 under the title The Old, Weird America). In it, he quotes Robertson's memory of the recording: "[Dylan] would pull these songs out of nowhere. We didn't know if he wrote them or if he remembered them. When he sang them, you couldn't tell." Marcus calls the songs "palavers with a community of ghosts. ... These ghosts were not abstractions. As native sons and daughters they were a community. And they were once gathered in a single place: on the Anthology of American Folk Music". A collection of blues and country music recorded in the 1920s and 1930s, the Anthology—compiled by Harry Smith and originally released by Folkways Records in 1952—was a major influence on the folk music revival of the 1950s and the 1960s. Marcus suggests that Dylan's Basement Tapes shared with Smith's Anthology a sense of alchemy, "and in the alchemy is an undiscovered country".

== Legacy ==
While removed from the public's gaze, Dylan and the Band made music very different from the recordings of other major artists. Andy Gill writes, "Musically, the songs were completely at odds with what was going on in the rest of the pop world, which during the long, hot summer of 1967 was celebrating the birth of the hippie movement with a gaudy explosion of 'psychedelic' music—mostly facile paeans to universal love draped in interminable guitar solos." Patrick Humphries itemizes the ways in which Dylan's songs dissented from the dominant ethos of rock culture: "While the rock world vented its spleen on parents and leaders, Dylan was singing privately about parental fidelity. While George Harrison was testifying that life went on within and without you, Dylan was taking his potatoes down to be mashed. While Mick Jagger was 2,000 light years from home, Dylan was strapping himself to a tree with roots."

This aspect of the basement recordings became obvious when Dylan chose to record his next album, John Wesley Harding, in Nashville in late 1967. The songs on that record, according to Howard Sounes, revealed the influence of Dylan's daily reading of both the Bible and the Hank Williams songbook. And its sound came as a shock to other rock musicians. As producer Bob Johnston recalled, "Every artist in the world was in the studio trying to make the biggest-sounding record they possibly could. So what does [Dylan] do? He comes to Nashville and tells me he wants to record with a bass, drum and guitar." Dylan summed up the gap: "At that time psychedelic rock was overtaking the universe and we were singing these homespun ballads."

When the Band began work on their debut album, Music from Big Pink, in a New York studio in January 1968, they employed a recording technique similar to the one they had become familiar with during The Basement Tapes sessions. As Robertson described it, "We used the same kind of mic on everything. A bit of an anti-studio approach. And we realized what was comfortable to us was turning wherever we were into a studio. Like the Big Pink technique." That technique influenced groups including the Beatles, writes Griffin, who calls their Twickenham Get Back sessions in early 1969 an effort to record "in the honest, live, no frills, no overdubs, down home way that the Hawks/Band did for The Basement Tapes".

"Listening to The Basement Tapes now, it seems to be the beginning of what is called Americana or alt country," wrote Billy Bragg. "The thing about alt.country which makes it 'alt' is that it is not polished. It is not rehearsed or slick. Neither are The Basement Tapes. Remember that The Basement Tapes holds a certain cultural weight which is timeless—and the best Americana does that as well." The songs' influence has been detected by critics in many subsequent acts. Stuart Bailie wrote, "If rock'n'roll is the sound of a party in session, The Basement Tapes were the morning after: bleary, and a bit rueful but dashed with emotional potency. Countless acts—Mercury Rev, Cowboy Junkies, Wilco, the Waterboys—have since tried to get back to that place."

For Elvis Costello, The Basement Tapes "sound like they were made in a cardboard box. I think [Dylan] was trying to write songs that sounded like he'd just found them under a stone. As if they sound like real folk songs—because if you go back into the folk tradition, you will find songs as dark and as deep as these."

In 2003, Rolling Stone magazine ranked The Basement Tapes number 291 on its list of the 500 greatest albums of all time, number 292 in a 2012 revised list, and number 335 in the magazine's 2020 list. In a special issue devoted to Dylan's work, Q magazine awarded the record five stars, its highest rating, commenting that "Dylan's work is by turns haunting, hilarious and puzzling—and all of it taps into centuries of American song".

Hip hop group Public Enemy referenced the album in their 2007 Dylan tribute song "Long and Whining Road": "From basement tapes, beyond them dollars and cents / Changing of the guards spent, now where the hell the majors went?"

== Other released Basement Tape songs ==
Between 1985 and 2013, Columbia issued five additional 1967 recordings by Dylan from Big Pink: take 2 of "Quinn the Eskimo (The Mighty Quinn)" on Biograph in 1985, "I Shall Be Released" and "Santa-Fe" on The Bootleg Series Volumes 1–3 (Rare & Unreleased) 1961–1991 in 1991, "I'm Not There (1956)" on the I'm Not There soundtrack in 2007, and "Minstrel Boy" on The Bootleg Series Vol. 10 – Another Self Portrait (1969–1971) in 2013. In the early 1970s, Dylan released new recordings of five compositions from The Basement Tape era: live performances of "Minstrel Boy" and "Quinn the Eskimo" from the Isle of Wight Festival on August 31, 1969, appeared on Self Portrait, and October 1971 recordings with Happy Traum of "You Ain't Goin' Nowhere", "I Shall Be Released" and "Down in the Flood" appeared on Bob Dylan's Greatest Hits Vol. II.

In 2005, the Band compilation A Musical History was released, which includes the 1967 Woodstock Band recordings "Words and Numbers", "You Don't Come Through", "Caledonia Mission", "Ferdinand the Imposter" and "Will the Circle Be Unbroken". In 1968, the Band re-recorded "This Wheel's on Fire", "Tears of Rage", "I Shall Be Released" and "Caledonia Mission" in studios in New York and Los Angeles for Music From Big Pink. Versions of other Band Basement Tape compositions, recorded in various locations between 1967 and possibly 1975, appear on Across the Great Divide and A Musical History, and as bonus tracks on the 2000 reissues of Music From Big Pink and Cahoots. Live versions by the Band of various Basement Tapes songs have also been issued: "I Shall Be Released" on Before the Flood; "Caledonia Mission" and "This Wheel's On Fire" on Rock of Ages, with "I Shall Be Released", "Down in the Flood" and "Don't Ya Tell Henry" appearing on the album's 2001 reissue; "I Shall Be Released" on The Last Waltz and "This Wheel's On Fire" on the 2002 box set release of the album; "I Shall Be Released" and "Don't Ya Tell Henry" on Live at Watkins Glen; and "Ain't No Cane on the Brazos" recorded live at the Woodstock Festival in August 1969, on Across the Great Divide.

On March 31, 2009, Legacy Records issued a remastered version of the original 1975 Basement Tapes double album, which critics praised for its improved sound quality. According to reviewer Scott Hreha, there was "something about the remastering that makes it feel more like an official album—the earlier CD version's weak fidelity unfairly emphasized the 'basement' nature of the recordings, where it now possesses a clarity that belies its humble and informal origins."

In the early 1990s, a virtually complete collection of all of Dylan's 1967 recordings in Woodstock was released on a bootleg five-CD set, The Genuine Basement Tapes. The collection, which contains over 100 songs and alternate takes, was later remastered and issued as the four-CD bootleg A Tree With Roots. On November 4, 2014, Columbia/Legacy issued The Bootleg Series Vol. 11: The Basement Tapes Complete, an official 6-CD box set containing 139 tracks, mastered by Peter J. Moore, which comprises nearly all of Dylan's basement recordings, including 30 never-bootlegged tracks. A companion 2-CD set containing highlights from the recordings, The Basement Tapes Raw, was also released.

For a comprehensive list of the 1967 Basement Tapes session recordings, see List of Basement Tapes songs.

== Track listing ==
All tracks are written by Bob Dylan, except where noted.

Side one
No.	Title	Writer(s)	Lead vocals	Length
1.	"Odds and Ends"		Dylan	1:47
2.	"Orange Juice Blues (Blues for Breakfast)*"	Richard Manuel	Manuel	3:39
3.	"Million Dollar Bash"		Dylan	2:32
4.	"Yazoo Street Scandal*"	Robbie Robertson	Levon Helm	3:29
5.	"Goin' to Acapulco"		Dylan	5:27
6.	"Katie's Been Gone*"	Manuel, Robertson	Manuel	2:46
Total length:				19:40

Side two
No.	Title	Writer(s)	Lead vocals	Length
1.	"Lo and Behold!"		Dylan	2:46
2.	"Bessie Smith*"	Rick Danko, Robertson	Danko, Robertson	4:18
3.	"Clothes Line Saga"		Dylan	2:58
4.	"Apple Suckling Tree"		Dylan	2:48
5.	"Please, Mrs. Henry"		Dylan	2:33
6.	"Tears of Rage"	Dylan, Manuel	Dylan	4:15
Total length:				19:38

Side three
No.	Title	Writer(s)	Lead vocals	Length
1.	"Too Much of Nothing"		Dylan	3:04
2.	"Yea! Heavy and a Bottle of Bread"		Dylan	2:15
3.	"Ain't No More Cane*"	Traditional	Helm, Robertson, Danko, Manuel	3:58
4.	"Crash on the Levee (Down in the Flood)"		Dylan	2:04
5.	"Ruben Remus*"	Manuel, Robertson	Manuel	3:16
6.	"Tiny Montgomery"		Dylan	2:47
Total length:				17:24

Side four
No.	Title	Writer(s)	Lead vocals	Length
1.	"You Ain't Goin' Nowhere"		Dylan	2:42
2.	"Don't Ya Tell Henry*"		Helm	3:13
3.	"Nothing Was Delivered"		Dylan	4:23
4.	"Open the Door, Homer"		Dylan	2:49
5.	"Long Distance Operator*"		Manuel	3:39
6.	"This Wheel's on Fire"	Danko, Dylan	Dylan	3:52
Total length:				20:38

Asterisks indicate the eight previously unreleased recordings made by The Band which don’t feature Dylan.
Note: The cassette version includes LP sides one and two on side one, and LP sides four and three (in that order) on side two.

== Personnel ==
- Bob Dylan – acoustic guitar, piano, vocals
- Rick Danko – bass guitar, mandolin, backing vocals
- Levon Helm – drums, mandolin, bass guitar, vocals
- Garth Hudson – Lowrey organ, clavinet, accordion, tenor saxophone, piano
- Richard Manuel – piano, drums, harmonica, vocals
- Robbie Robertson – electric guitar, acoustic guitar, drums, backing vocals

== See also ==
- List of Basement Tapes songs (1975)
- Lost on the River: The New Basement Tapes
- The Bootleg Series Vol. 11: The Basement Tapes Complete
