= American Myth =

Studio album by Jackie Greene
- Released: March 14, 2006
- Genre: Americana
- Label: Verve Forecast

Jackie Greene chronology
Sweet Somewhere Bound (2004)	American Myth (2006)	Giving up the Ghost (2008)

Professional ratings
Review scores
Source	Rating
AllMusic	4/5 stars

American Myth is a 2006 album released by Jackie Greene.

== Track listing ==
1. "Intro" – 0:50
2. "Hollywood" – 4:59
3. "So Hard to Find My Way" – 4:10
4. "Just as Well" – 4:57
5. "I'm So Gone" – 4:13
6. "Never Satisfied (Revisited)" – 3:58
7. "Love Song; 2:00 AM" – 5:05
8. "When You're Walking Away" – 4:46
9. "Cold Black Devil/14 Miles" – 4:53
10. "Closer to You" – 3:57
11. "I'll Let You In" – 5:19
12. "Farewell, So Long, Goodbye" – 3:30
13. "Supersede" – 9:57
14. "Marigold" – 5:34
