= Love for Levon =

2012 benefit concert

Love for Levon: Benefit To Save The Barn
- Promotional poster
- Location: East Rutherford, New Jersey, U.S.
- Venue: Izod Center
- Date: October 3, 2012
- Attendance: 15,000

Love for Levon: Benefit to Save the Barn was a benefit concert held on October 3, 2012 at the Izod Center in East Rutherford, New Jersey. The concert was a posthumous tribute to the life of The Band's co-lead vocalist and drummer Levon Helm, who died of throat cancer on April 19, 2012. The concert featured a wide variety of musicians who had worked with Helm as well as musicians who were influenced by him. Proceeds from the concert went towards keeping Helm's Woodstock barn in his family's control as well as continuing his Midnight Ramble concert series in the barn. The concert's musical directors were Don Was and Helm's frequent collaborator Larry Campbell. The concert was released on CD and DVD on March 19, 2013.

== Album and video ==
Love for Levon: A Benefit to Save the Barn

Live album by various artists
- Released: March 19, 2013
- Recorded: October 3, 2012
- Venue: Izod Center; East Rutherford, New Jersey
- Genre: Rock, Americana
- Label: Time Life Entertainment

The concert was released as a two-disc album on CD, and also as a two-disc video on DVD and Blu-ray, on March 19, 2013.

== Musicians ==
=== House bands ===
There were two separate house bands for the performance which shared many of the same members. One band was The Levon Helm Band and the other was The All Star Band. The horn section backed both bands for most songs. Some songs included only some members of either band, and My Morning Jacket performed their songs with only the assistance of the horn section.

The All Star Band

- Larry Campbell – acoustic and electric guitar, mandolin, fiddle, lead and backing vocals
- Amy Helm – lead and backing vocals
- Teresa Williams – lead and backing vocals
- Greg Leisz – acoustic and electric guitar
- Kenny Aronoff – drums
- Don Was – bass guitar, double bass
- Brian Mitchell – piano, organ, accordion, keyboards

The Levon Helm Band

- Larry Campbell – acoustic and electric guitar, mandolin, fiddle, lead and backing vocals
- Amy Helm – lead and backing vocals
- Teresa Williams – lead and backing vocals
- Jim Weider – acoustic and electric guitar
- Justin Guip – drums
- Byron Isaacs – bass guitar, double bass
- Brian Mitchell – piano, organ, accordion, keyboards

The Horn Section

- Steven Bernstein – trumpet, alto horn, soprano trombone
- Jay Collins – tenor saxophone
- Earl McIntyre – trombone
- Howard Johnson – tuba, baritone saxophone
- Erik Lawrence – soprano and alto saxophone

=== Special guests ===
Roger Waters, Garth Hudson, My Morning Jacket, John Mayer, Joe Walsh, Dierks Bentley, Eric Church, Gregg Allman, Bruce Hornsby, Ray LaMontagne, John Hiatt, Grace Potter, Warren Haynes, Lucinda Williams, Mavis Staples, Allen Toussaint, David Bromberg, Robert Randolph, John Prine, Jorma Kaukonen, Marc Cohn, Jakob Dylan, Mike Gordon, Joan Osborne, Jai Johanny Johanson, Jon Randall, Matt Burr, Barry Mitterhoff, Jessi Alexander, Steve Jordan, Shawn Pelton, Rami Jaffee and G.E. Smith

== Setlist ==
The set list was composed primarily of songs by The Band and Levon Helm solo (including songs they covered or recorded on with another artist). The running order and songs performed consisted of:

1. The All-Star Band
  - "The Shape I'm In" (ft. Warren Haynes, Rami Jaffee)
  - "Long Black Veil" (ft. Gregg Allman, Haynes)
2. "Trouble in Mind" (ft. Larry Campbell, Justin Guip, Byron Issacs, Jai Johanny Johanson, Jorma Kaukonen, Barry Mitterhoff)
3. The Levon Helm Band
  - "This Wheel's on Fire" (ft. Campbell, Shawn Pelton)
  - "Little Birds" (ft. Campbell, Guip, Amy Helm, Isaacs, Teresa Williams)
  - "Listening to Levon" (ft. Marc Cohn, Greg Leisz)
  - "Move Along Train" (ft. Mavis Staples)
  - "Life is a Carnival" (ft. Johanson, Allen Toussaint)
  - "When I Paint My Masterpiece" (ft. Garth Hudson, Joan Osborne, John Prine)
4. "Anna Lee" (ft. Campbell, Helm, Bruce Hornsby, Williams)
5. The All-Star Band
  - "Ain't Got No Home" (ft. Jakob Dylan, Jaffee)
  - "Whispering Pines" (ft. Jaffee, Lucinda Williams)
  - "Rag Mama Rag" (ft. Mike Gordon, John Hiatt)

Intermission

1. The All-Star Band
  - "Don't Do It" (ft. David Bromberg, Gordon, Osborne)
2. "I Shall Be Released" (ft. Matt Burr, Grace Potter, Don Was)
3. The All-Star Band
  - "Tears of Rage" (ft. Steve Jordan, Ray LaMontagne, John Mayer)
  - "Rockin' Chair" (ft. Jessi Alexander, Dierks Bentley, Jon Randall)
  - "Chest Fever" (ft. Alexander, Bentley, Randall, Hudson)
  - "A Train Robbery" (ft. Eric Church)
  - "Get Up Jake" (ft. Church)
  - "Tennessee Jed" (ft. Campbell, Jordan, Mayer)
  - "Up on Cripple Creek" (ft. Robert Randolph, Joe Walsh)
4. My Morning Jacket (ft. Steven Bernstein, Jay Collins, Howard Johnson, Erik Lawrence, Earl McIntyre)
  - "Ophelia"
  - "It Makes No Difference"
  - "The Night They Drove Old Dixie Down" (ft. G.E. Smith, Roger Waters)
5. The All-Star Band
  - "Wide River to Cross" (ft. Helm, Smith, Waters)
6. The All-Star and Levon Helm Bands
  - "The Weight" (ft. all guest musicians)
