= Gone Wanderin' =

Studio album by Jackie Greene
- Released: November 19, 2002
- Genre: Americana
- Length: 49:59
- Label: Dig Music
- Producer: Zachary Proteau

Jackie Greene chronology
Gone Wanderin' (2002)	Rusty Nails (2003)

Professional ratings
Review scores
Source	Rating
Allmusic	3.5/5 stars

Gone Wanderin' is the debut studio album released by Jackie Greene.

== Track listing ==
All songs written by Jackie Greene except where indicated.

1. "Gone Wanderin'" – 2:55
2. "Tell Me Mama, Tell Me Right" – 2:36
3. "Travelin' Song" – 3:57
4. "Mexican Girl" – 4:02
5. "Down in the Valley Woe" – 4:22
6. "Cry Yourself Dry" – 4:27
7. "By the Side of the Road, Dressed to Kill" – 4:18
8. "Freeport Boulevard" – 3:17
9. "Judgement Day" – 2:52
10. "Gracie" – 4:33
11. "Maria, Maria (It's a Sin to Tell a Lie)" – 2:48
12. "The Ballad of Sleepy John" – 5:07
13. "Messin' with the Kid" (Live, with Mick Martin & The Blues Rockers) (Mel London) – 4:39
