= Music for Our Lady Queen of the Angels =

Studio album by Garth Hudson
- Released: September 10, 1980
- Recorded: September 1979 – March 1980
- Genre: Symphonic rock
- Length: 61:15
- Label: Buscador EGH (1980); Other People's Music (2005)
- Producer: Garth Hudson

Garth Hudson chronology
Music for Our Lady Queen of the Angels (1980)	The Sea to the North (2001)

Professional ratings
Review scores
Source	Rating
Allmusic	Link

Music for Our Lady Queen of the Angels is the first solo album by Canadian multi-instrumentalist Garth Hudson, released in 1980 (see 1980 in music).

The album is a soundtrack for a special installation for exhibition at the Los Angeles Museum of Science and Industry by sculptor Tony Duquette. The title is a reference to Our Lady Queen of the Angels and the naming of the Pueblo de Los Angeles.

The music that Hudson wrote and recorded for this exhibition was released on cassette under the title Our Lady Queen of the Angels: A Celebrational Environment by Tony Duquette on his own label. It was reissued in 2005, with the same original master tapes.

== Track listing ==
All pieces by Garth Hudson.

1. "Music for Our Lady Queen of the Angels" – 11:01
2. "Poetic Invocation" – 10:45
3. "Music for the Garden of the Angels" – 7:23
4. "Music for Our Lady Queen of the Angels, Pt. 2" – 10:50
5. "Music for the Garden of the Angels, Pt. 2" – 7:05
6. "Music for Our Lady Queen of the Angels (Reprise)" – 10:39

== Personnel ==
- Garth Hudson: keyboards, organ, piano, pedal steel, synthesizers, mini moog, saxophones, trumpet, clavinet, mellotron, vocals
- Doug Atwell: Violin.
- Pete Grant: Dobro, pedal steel.
- Dale Turner: Trumpet.
- John Hernandez: Percussion.
- Maud Hudson: Vocals.
- Richard Manuel: Vocals.
- David Mook: Vocals.
- Dani Johnson: Vocals.
- Keg Johnson: Vocals.

Technical personnel:

- Ray Bradbury: Poem Writer.
- Charlton Heston: Narration.
- Garth Hudson: Music Composer, producer, engineer.
- Wayne Neuendorf: Engineer.
- Douglas Perry: Engineer.
- Al Schmitt, Jr.: Engineer.
- Tom Seufert: Engineer.
- Karen Siegel: Engineer.
- Walt Weiskopf: Engineer.
- Tim Kramer: Engineer.
- Paul Lani: Engineer.
- Daniel Lazerus: Engineer.
- Larry Hinds: Engineer.
- Steve Hirsch: Engineer.
- Jim Allen: Engineer.
- Ed Anderson: Engineer.
- Jay Antista: Engineer.
- Ray Blair: Engineer.
- Jerry Brown: Engineer.
- Kirk Butler: Engineer.
- Morgan Cavett: Engineer.
- Joel Fein: Engineer.
- Howard Gale: Engineer.
- Jerry Hall: Engineer.
- Peter J. Moore: Remastering.
