= Northern Lights – Southern Cross =

Studio album by the Band
- Released: November 1975
- Recorded: Spring–Summer 1975
- Studios: Shangri-La Studio, Zuma Beach, California
- Genres: Roots rock; folk rock; country rock; Americana
- Length: 40:39
- Label: Capitol
- Producer: The Band

The Band chronology
The Basement Tapes (1975)	Northern Lights – Southern Cross (1975)	The Best of the Band (1976)

Professional ratings
Review scores
Source	Rating
AllMusic	4/5 stars
Christgau's Record Guide	B+
MusicHound	3.5/5 stars
The Rolling Stone Album Guide	3.5/5 stars
Uncut	8/10

Northern Lights – Southern Cross is the sixth studio album by Canadian-American rock group the Band. It was released in November 1975 through Capitol Records. The album was self-produced and is the only Band album entirely written by guitarist Robbie Robertson. Recorded at the band's own Shangri-La studio, it was the group's first album of original material since Cahoots (1971).

Reviews for Northern Lights – Southern Cross were positive, with many considering it an improvement over the group's previous few albums. However, it was not as commercially successful as the Band's earlier work, stalling at number 26 in the US. "Ophelia" was released as a single, reaching number 62 on the Billboard Hot 100.

== Track listing ==
All tracks are written by Robbie Robertson.

Side one
No.	Title	Lead vocals	Length
1.	"Forbidden Fruit"	Levon Helm	5:56
2.	"Hobo Jungle"	Richard Manuel	4:10
3.	"Ophelia"	Helm	3:29
4.	"Acadian Driftwood"	Manuel; Helm; Rick Danko	6:41
Total length:			20:16

Side two
No.	Title	Lead vocals	Length
1.	"Ring Your Bell"	Danko; Manuel; Helm	3:53
2.	"It Makes No Difference"	Danko	6:30
3.	"Jupiter Hollow"	Helm; Manuel	5:18
4.	"Rags and Bones"	Manuel	4:42
Total length:			20:23

Bonus tracks (2001 reissue)
No.	Title	Lead vocals	Length
9.	"Twilight" (early alternate version)	Helm; Danko	3:13
10.	"Christmas Must Be Tonight" (alternate version)	Danko	3:01
Total length:			46:53

== Personnel ==
The Band

- Rick Danko – bass, guitar, violin, harmonica, vocals, mixing
- Levon Helm – drums, guitar, percussion, vocals
- Garth Hudson – organ, keyboards, accordion, saxophones, synthesizers, piccolo, brass, woodwind, chanter, bass, mixing
- Richard Manuel – acoustic and electric piano, keyboards, organ, drums, clavinet, percussion, vocals
- Robbie Robertson – guitars, piano, clavinet, melodica, percussion, mixing

Additional personnel

- Byron Berline – fiddle on "Acadian Driftwood"
- Nat Jeffrey – engineer, mixing
- Rob Fraboni – engineer, mixing
- Ed Anderson – engineer

== Charts ==
Album - Billboard (United States)

Year	Chart	Position
1976	Billboard 200	26

Singles - Billboard (United States)

Year	Single	Chart	Position
1976	"Ophelia"	Hot 100	62
