= Endless Highway: The Music of the Band =

Compilation album by various artists
- Released: January 30, 2007
- Recorded: July 19, 2005 – August 1, 2006
- Genre: Rock, Americana
- Label: 429 Records

Professional ratings
Review scores
Source	Rating
AllMusic	4/5 stars

Endless Highway: The Music of the Band, a tribute to the Band, was released on January 30, 2007.

== Track listing ==
All songs written by Robbie Robertson unless noted otherwise.

1. "This Wheel's on Fire" (Bob Dylan, Rick Danko) performed by Guster – 3:24
2. "King Harvest (Has Surely Come)" performed by Bruce Hornsby and the Noisemakers – 4:03
3. "It Makes No Difference" performed by My Morning Jacket – 6:19
4. "I Shall Be Released" (Dylan) performed by Jack Johnson with ALO – 4:11
5. "The Weight" performed by Lee Ann Womack – 4:48
6. "Chest Fever" performed by Widespread Panic – 6:34
7. "Up on Cripple Creek" performed by Gomez – 4:37
8. "The Night They Drove Old Dixie Down" performed by the Allman Brothers Band – 5:03
9. "Stage Fright" performed by Steve Reynolds – 3:44
10. "Rag Mama Rag" performed by Blues Traveler – 3:18
11. "Whispering Pines" (Richard Manuel, Robertson) performed by Jakob Dylan – 4:05
12. "Acadian Driftwood" performed by the Roches – 6:20
13. "The Unfaithful Servant" performed by Rosanne Cash – 4:56
14. "When I Paint My Masterpiece" (Dylan) performed by Josh Turner – 5:03
15. "Life Is a Carnival" (Danko, Levon Helm, Robertson) performed by Trevor Hall – 4:09
16. "Look Out Cleveland" performed by Jackie Greene – 3:13
17. "Rockin' Chair" performed by Death Cab for Cutie – 5:31

Bonus disc included 4 extra songs.

1. "Across the Great Divide" performed by Lucas Reynolds
2. "Ophelia" performed by ALO
3. "Bessie Smith" performed by Joe Henry
4. "The Shape I'm In" performed by Gov't Mule
