= Jackie Greene =

American musician (born 1980)

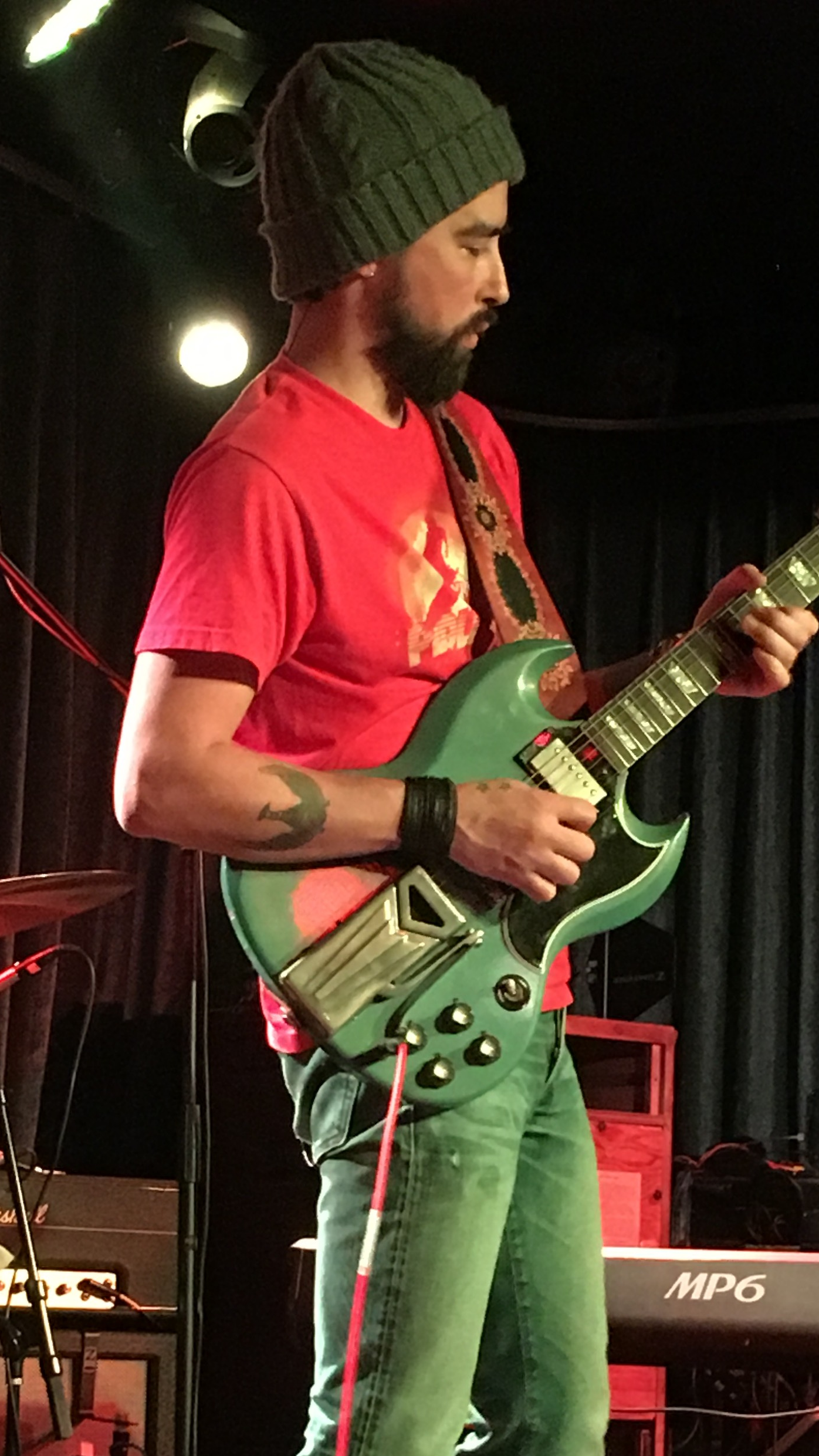
- Greene performing in February 2016

Background information
- Born: November 27, 1980 (age 45); Salinas, California, United States
- Genres: Americana, roots rock, blues
- Occupations: Singer, songwriter, musician
- Instruments: Guitar, piano, keyboards, harmonica, mandolin, banjo, drums
- Years active: 2002–present
- Labels: Dig Music, Verve Forecast, 429
- Website: www.jackiegreene.com

Jackie Greene (born November 27, 1980) is an American singer-songwriter and musician. He has a solo career and became a member of The Black Crowes in 2013, though the band broke up in 2015 before he could contribute any studio work.

== Early life and education ==
Greene was born Chris Nelson in Salinas, California. He grew up in Cameron Park near Sacramento, where he developed an interest in music at an early age, starting with the piano. At 14, he began to play guitar and within a short time, was able to sit in with local bar bands. As he got older, he began composing his own songs.

He attended and graduated from Oak Ridge High School in El Dorado Hills, California. He played on May 30, 2026, with Terrapin Crossroads, primarily a Grateful Dead cover band, in Monte Rio, California.

== Career ==
After graduating from high school, Greene moved to Sacramento, where he began playing at local establishments, including Marilyn's, Fox & Goose, and The Blue Lamp. He recorded in a makeshift garage studio, burning his own CDs and selling them everywhere he could. Using the money he saved, Greene was eventually able to record and release his first full-length album, Rusty Nails, at Sound Solutions Recording Studio in Fair Oaks with the help of musician, engineer, producer Thomas Victor Ford.

In late 2002, Greene released his first album with DIG, Gone Wanderin', which won the California Music Award for the Best Blues/Roots Album in 2003 and remained on the national Americana charts for over a year. In 2004, Greene released his third album, Sweet Somewhere Bound, and began receiving radio play for singles like "Honey I Been Thinking About You".

Greene has toured nationally with Gov't Mule, Los Lobos, Mark Knopfler, B.B. King, Phil Lesh, Ratdog, Huey Lewis, Susan Tedeschi, Taj Mahal, and Buddy Guy, and has played major U.S. festivals, including All Good, Gathering of the Vibes, Mountain Jam, Grateful Garcia Gathering, Newport Jazz, Newport Folk, South by Southwest, Wakarusa, Winnipeg Folk, Bonnaroo, Outside Lands, and Rothbury. He has performed with Levon Helm at several Midnight Rambles.

In early 2005, he signed with Verve Forecast. Sweet Somewhere Bound was reissued that year, followed by a new release, American Myth, in March 2006. The following year, Greene joined Phil Lesh and Friends, the Grateful Dead bassist's ensemble dedicated to the interpretation of the Dead's extensive song book. Other members of the band at the time included John Molo, Larry Campbell and Steve Molitz. Also in 2005 his song "I Will Never Let You Go" was used in the score for the movie Brokeback Mountain, winning the Academy Award in 2005 for Best Original Score, and which was also released on the Verve label.

In 2007, his cover of "Look Out Cleveland" was included on the tribute album Endless Highway: The Music of The Band.

Meanwhile, Greene continued to pursue solo efforts, releasing Giving Up the Ghost on 429 Records in April 2008, and made his second visit to Late Night with Conan O'Brien in June 2008, performing "Like A Ball & Chain". Another song from the album, "I Don't Live in a Dream", was featured on episodes of the NBC television series Life in November 2008 and ABC's Private Practice in March 2009.

In October through November 2009, Jackie Greene played a series of shows with Gov't Mule, culminating at the end of the tour on Halloween at the Tower Theater in Upper Darby Township, Pennsylvania, during which Jackie played and sang through an entire set of Rolling Stones songs with Gov't Mule.

The Jackie Greene Band currently features Nathan Dale and Jeremy Plog on guitar, Jon Cornell on bass, and Fitz Harris on drums. Past members included Steve Taylor, Zack Bowden, Hence Phillips, Matt McCord, Bruce Spencer, Ben Lefever, and Nick Swimley.

Greene was a member of Trigger Hippy. In early 2012 Greene, Bob Weir of the Grateful Dead and Chris Robinson of the Black Crowes embarked on an acoustic tour. They called themselves the Weir, Robinson, Greene trio, or WRG for short.

In spring 2013, Greene joined the Black Crowes as lead guitarist, replacing Luther Dickinson, for the band's Lay Down With Number 13 world tour.

More recently, Greene was featured in World Gone Mad, the new album from the Weight Band, on a Jerry Garcia cover. In 2019, he embarked upon his 100% Greene Tour starting with a two-night engagement at Ophelia's in Denver, CO followed by stops at various locations of City Winery.
In 2023, Greene toured with Govt Mule for their "Dark Side of the Mule" tour.

== Discography ==
- Gone Wanderin' (2002)
- Rusty Nails (2003)
- Sweet Somewhere Bound (2004)
- American Myth (2006)
- Giving Up the Ghost (2008)
- Small Tempest (2009)
- Till the Light Comes (2010)
- Back to Birth (2015)
- The Dig Years (2017 Re-release) (Blue Rose Music)
- The Modern Lives – Vol 1 (2017) (Blue Rose Music)
- The Modern Lives – Vol 2 (2018) (Blue Rose Music)
- Live from Town Hall (2019) (Blue Rose Music)
- 100% Greene - Live at the Throckmorton Theatre (2019) (Blue Rose Music)
