= Rock's Backpages =

Online archive of music journalism

- Producer: Rock's Backpages (United Kingdom)
- History: 2000–present

Access
- Cost: Subscription

Coverage
- Disciplines: Music
- Record depth: Full-text
- Format coverage: Articles
- No. of records: 56,000

Links
- Website: rocksbackpages.com

Rock's Backpages is an online archive of music journalism, sourced from contributions to the music and mainstream press from the 1950s to the present day. The articles are full text and searchable, and all are reproduced with the permission of the copyright holders. The database was founded in 2000 by British music journalist Barney Hoskyns. As of March 2025 its database contains over 56,000 articles, including interviews, features and reviews, which covered popular music from blues and soul up to the present date. Rock's Backpages also features over 900 audio interviews with musicians from Jimi Hendrix and Johnny Cash to Kate Bush and Kurt Cobain.

The articles are sourced from magazines including Creem, Rolling Stone, New Musical Express, Melody Maker, Crawdaddy! and Mojo. The database contains contributions from over 800 journalists, primarily from the US and UK, including Dave Marsh, Nick Kent, Charles Shaar Murray, Nick Tosches, Mick Farren, Vivien Goldman, Al Aronowitz and Ian MacDonald. While some articles are free to read, access to most requires a subscription.

Since 2018, Hoskyns has co-hosted the Rock's Backpages podcast with his colleagues Mark Pringle, Martin Colyer and Jasper Murison-Bowie: guests on the almost 200 episodes have included the abovementioned Kent, Murray and Goldman, along with fellow RBP contributors Neil Tennant, Val Wilmer, Nick Hornby, Simon Reynolds and Ann Powers. Non-RBP guests have included Joe Boyd, Chris Blackwell, Pamela Des Barres, Midge Ure, Billy Bragg, Penelope Spheeris and Peter Guralnick.

Rock's Backpages has also published anthologies of articles about Radiohead, Steely Dan and Joni Mitchell. In 2024, Barney Hoskyns and Jasper Murison-Bowie co-edited Phew, Eh, Readers? a collection of pieces by (and about) the late Tom Hibbert.
