= Sweet Somewhere Bound =

Studio album by Jackie Greene
- Released: July 20, 2004
- Genre: Americana
- Length: 66:21
- Label: Dig Music
- Producer: Jackie Greene, David Houston

Jackie Greene chronology
Rusty Nails (2003)	Sweet Somewhere Bound (2004)	American Myth (2006)

Professional ratings
Review scores
Source	Rating
Allmusic	3.5/5 stars

Sweet Somewhere Bound is the third studio album released by Jackie Greene.

== Track listing ==
1. "About Cell Block #9" – 3:44
2. "Honey I Been Thinking About You" – 4:45
3. "Sweet Somewhere Bound" – 4:59
4. "Miss Madeline (3 Ways to Love Her)" – 5:39
5. "A Thing Called Rain" – 4:35
6. "Write a Letter Home" – 4:47
7. "I Don't Care About My Baby" – 4:05
8. "Alice on the Rooftop" – 4:51
9. "Seven Jealous Sisters" – 4:11
10. "Emily's in Heaven" – 5:24
11. "Sad to Say Goodbye" – 4:55
12. "Everything to Me" – 6:03
13. "Don't Mind Me, I'm Only Dying Slow" – 7:56
