= Paul London (singer) =

Canadian singer

Paul Hutchins, stage name Paul London, is a Canadian singer. Originally from Kingsville, Ontario, he moved to the Windsor, Ontario/Detroit area, where there was more work for musicians. It was there, in 1959, that he joined up with another London band, the Silhouettes (featuring Garth Hudson), and they became Paul London and The Capers (later "Kapers"). The band went on to release two singles, one ("Rosie Lee") recorded at RCA Victor in Toronto, and another )"Sugar Baby" at Chess Studios in Chicago, while other Chess recordings remained unreleased. The band broke up after a few years (although a Hutchins-less band re-formed as "The Capers" in 1965), and Hutchins continued a solo career as Paul London.
