= Rusty Nails (album) =

Studio album by Jackie Greene
- Released: January 14, 2003
- Genre: Americana
- Length: 60:08
- Label: Dig Music

Jackie Greene chronology
Gone Wanderin' (2002)	Rusty Nails (2003)	Sweet Somewhere Bound (2004)

Rusty Nails is the second studio album released by Jackie Greene, released by Dig in 2003.

== Track listing ==
No.	Title	Length
1.	"Pale Blue Monday"	6:00
2.	"Santa Fe Girl"	5:19
3.	"The Lord Mistreats Me"	3:41
4.	"Georgia"	4:11
5.	"Passin' On the Blues"	4:32
6.	"Blue Sky"	4:32
7.	"Gettin' By"	5:31
8.	"The Rusty Nail"	3:47
9.	"Waiting for the Whistle"	5:08
10.	"Falling Back"	4:03
11.	"Never Satisfied"	3:39
12.	"What I Know"	3:27
13.	"Freeport Boulevard"	6:18
Total length:		65:08
