= Live at the Wolf =

Live album by Garth and Maud Hudson
- Released: October 18, 2005
- Recorded: September 8, 2002
- Genre: Folk rock
- Length: 54:28
- Label: Make It Real
- Producer: Lance Anderson

Garth and Maud Hudson chronology
To the Sea to the North (2001)	Live at the Wolf (2005)

Professional ratings
Review scores
Source	Rating
Allmusic	3.5/5 stars

Live at the Wolf is the first live album by The Band's member Garth Hudson, and his wife Maud. It's only a Piano-Accordion-vocal album.

This album is a recording of an intimate performance by the Hudsons, who were there to celebrate the opening weekend of the new London Public Library's Wolf Performance Hall in London, Ontario, Canada.

Hudson displays a virtuosity on the piano that is reminiscent of Art Tatum. He weaves in and out of jazz standards, quoting from a wide range of jazz piano history. He is a master of the idiom and is as at home in Teddy Wilson style walking tenths, as in Harlem stride. During the concert, Hudson was on a wheeled secretary chair, and would wheel over to his wife Maud between numbers to confer on the next song they would play.

This CD is one of a series of recordings on Canada's Make It Real Records (MIR), which is a boutique label, that specializes in recording real music, in real time on real instruments. "Live at the Wolf" is the only non-studio recording on the label. Other recordings by MIR include 2B3 The Toronto Sessions – various Hammond organ artists, My Regeneration – The Prima Donnas, Brotherhood – Blackburn, Footwork – Anderson & Sloski, Shorthanded – Lance Anderson.

== Track listing ==
1. "Every Time I See The Sun" (Garth Hudson) – 7:10
2. "It Makes No Difference" (Robbie Robertson) – 4:30
3. "Stand By Me" (Albert Tindley) – 5:04
4. "International Medley" (Garth Hudson) – 5:43
5. "Willow Weep For Me" (Ann Ronell) – 5:39
6. "You'll Be Thinkin'" (Maud Hudson) – 3:37
7. "Young Blood" (Jerry Leiber/Doc Pomus/Mike Stoller) – 2:53
8. "Beyond the Breakers" (Garth Hudson/Eric Andersen) – 4:02
9. "Concert Hora" (traditional) – 2:03
10. "Blind Willie McTell" (Bob Dylan) – 3:54
11. "Give Ear Unto My Prayer" (Jacob Arcadelt) – 1:03
12. "The Weight" (Robbie Robertson) – 5:48
13. "Little Island Blues" (Garth Hudson) – 2:03
  - Studio Bonus track

== Personnel ==
- Garth Hudson: Piano, accordion, vocals.
- Maud Hudson: Vocals.

Technical personnel:

- Lance Anderson: Producer, mixing, liner notes.
- Eddie Baltimore: Location recording engineer.
- Bruce Longman: Assistant engineer.
- Garth Hudson: Mixing, liner notes.
- Maud Hudson: Liner notes.
- Inaam Haq: Studio engineer, mixing.
- Peter J. Moore: Mastering.
- Kathy Hunt: Pre-Production
- Dave Mizrahi: Pre-Production
- Jeff Mochrie: Pre-Production
- Paul Reid: Pre-Production
- Slawomira Weber: Pre-Production
- James Stewart Reaney: Liner Notes
