= Barney Hoskyns =

British music critic (born 1959)

Barney Hoskyns (born 5 May 1959) is a British music critic and editorial director of the online music journalism archive Rock's Backpages.

== Biography ==
Hoskyns attended Westminster School , an elite private school in Westminster, London, in the precincts of Westminster Abbey , in existence from the 14th century, then graduated from the University of Oxford with a first class degree in English. He began writing about music for Melody Maker and New Musical Express, quitting his job as staff writer at NME to research a book about soul music. The result was Say It One Time For The Brokenhearted (1987). He went on to write more than fifteen books on musicians and music history.

Hoskyns has written regularly on pop culture and the arts for British Vogue, where for five years he was a contributing editor, and for The Times, The Guardian, The Independent, The Observer and Arena magazine. He has also contributed to Harper's Bazaar, Interview magazine, Spin magazine and Rolling Stone, as well as to Amazon.com and CDNOW. Between 1993 and 1999, Hoskyns worked as associate editor and then U.S. editor of Mojo magazine.

Hoskyns' book Glam! Bowie, Bolan & The Glitter Rock Revolution was published in 1998, tying in with Todd Haynes' Velvet Goldmine. Haynes provided an introduction.

In 2000, Hoskyns became senior editor of CDNow in London. He left to co-found Rock's Backpages, an online library of classic rock journalism that launched in September 2001.

Hoskyns has been a regular broadcaster and pundit on both radio and television in the UK, appearing on the Top Ten series (Channel 4), the I Love The 80s/90s series (BBC 2), Walk On By (BBC 2), Behind The Music (VH1) and Classic Albums (BBC 2). He was the consultant on the 2005 series Soul Deep (BBC 2). A BBC documentary based on his 2005 book Hotel California: Singer-Songwriters & Cocaine Cowboys In The L.A. Canyons was broadcast in 2007.

Hoskyns is married to interior designer and former actor Natalie Forbes. He has three sons from his first marriage to Victoria Sandler and two stepsons from his marriage to Forbes.

== Bibliography ==
Hoskyns' 1996 book Waiting For The Sun was nominated for a Ralph J. Gleason award in the US. Kirkus Reviews called it "a caustic, gossipy, refreshingly idiosyncratic history of the music business in Los Angeles."

Mojo reviewer Jim Farber gave Hoyskyns' Small Town Talk (spring 2016) four stars and described it as "a pitch-perfect East Coast corollary to his Laurel Canyon classic Hotel California".

In 2017, Hoskyns published Never Enough: A Way Through Addiction, an autobiographical account of how he became a heroin addict a few days after graduating from Oxford University, and how he finally overcame his addiction at the age of 23. The Guardian wrote of the account that "it’s unclear whether (Hoskyns) still harbours an affection for the attendant myth that helped guide him towards heroin", going on to comment on the book's "hint of almost fond nostalgia for the milieu of low-rent posh bohemia in which (Hoskyns) fed his habit...It's an ambitious, intelligent book that seeks to explain the appeal of drugs and drug culture, as well as the existential angst that drove Hoskyns to find oblivion at the end of a needle."

=== Nonfiction ===
- Say It One Time For The Brokenhearted: Country Soul In The American South (UK: Fontana, 1987; Bloomsbury reissue 1998)
- Montgomery Clift: Beautiful Loser (UK: Bloomsbury/ US: Grove, 1992)
- Across The Great Divide: The Band and America (UK: Viking; US: Hyperion, 1993; Hal Leonard Books US reissue, 2006)
- Waiting For The Sun: Strange Days, Weird Scenes & The Sound Of Los Angeles (UK: Viking/US: St. Martin's Press, 1996)
- Beneath the Diamond Sky: Haight-Ashbury 1965-1970 (UK: Bloomsbury; US: Simon & Schuster,1997)
- Glam! Bowie, Bolan & The Glitter Rock Revolution (UK: Faber; US: Simon & Schuster, 1998)
- The Mullet: Hairstyle Of The Gods (Bloomsbury, 1999), with Mark Larson
- The Sound and the Fury: 40 Years of Classic Rock Journalism: A Rock's Backpages Reader (Bloomsbury, 2003), editor
- Ozzy Osbourne: A Rock's Backpages Reader (Omnibus, 2004), editor
- Hotel California: Singer-Songwriters & Cocaine Cowboys In The L.A. Canyons (UK: 4th Estate/HarperCollins; US: Wiley, 2005)
- Led Zeppelin IV (Rock of Ages series) (Rodale Books, 2006)
- Lowside of the Road: A Life of Tom Waits (Faber and Faber, 2008)
- Trampled Under Foot: The Power and Excess of Led Zeppelin (UK: Faber, 2012); published in the US as Led Zeppelin: The Oral History of the World's Greatest Rock Band (Wiley, 2012)
- Small Town Talk: Bob Dylan, The Band, Van Morrison, Janis Joplin, Jimi Hendrix & Friends in the Wild Years of Woodstock (UK: Faber; US: Da Capo, 2016)
- Never Enough: A Way Through Addiction (Constable, 2017)
- Joni: The Anthology (Picador, 2017)

=== Fiction ===
- The Lonely Planet Boy: A Pop Romance (UK/US: Serpent's Tail, 1995)
