= Garth Hudson =

Canadian multi-instrumentalist (1937–2025)

Garth Hudson CM
- Hudson in 1969

Background information
- Born: Eric Garth Hudson; August 2, 1937; Windsor, Ontario, Canada
- Died: January 21, 2025 (aged 87) Woodstock, New York, U.S.
- Genres: Rock; Americana; jazz; folk; country; roots rock
- Occupations: Multi-instrumentalist; composer
- Instruments: Keyboards; saxophone; accordion
- Years active: 1949–2023
- Label: Capitol
- Formerly of: The Band; Burrito Deluxe
- Website: garthandmaud.com³

Eric Garth Hudson CM (August 2, 1937 – January 21, 2025) was a Canadian multi-instrumentalist best known as the keyboardist and occasional saxophonist for the Band. He was a principal architect of the group's sound and was described as "the most brilliant organist in the rock world" by Keyboard magazine. In 1994, Hudson was inducted into the Rock and Roll Hall of Fame as a member of the Band.

A master of the Lowrey organ, Hudson's other primary instruments were piano, accordion, electronic keyboards, and saxophones (soprano, alto, tenor, baritone, bass). He was a much-in-demand and respected session musician, performing with dozens of artists; Elton John has cited him as an early influence. By the time of his death in 2025, he was the Band's last surviving original member.

== Biography ==
=== Early life ===
Hudson was born in Windsor, Ontario, Canada, on August 2, 1937. His parents, Fred James Hudson and Olive Louella Pentland, were musicians. His mother played piano and accordion and sang. His father, a farm inspector who had fought as a fighter pilot in World War I, played drums, C melody saxophone, clarinet, flute and piano. Hudson moved with his family to London, Ontario, around 1940. Starting piano lessons at an early age, Hudson also played organ at his Plymouth Brethren church and his uncle's funeral parlour, and performed country songs on the accordion. Classically trained in piano, music theory, harmony and counterpoint, Hudson wrote his first song at the age of eleven and first played professionally with dance bands in 1949, at the age of twelve. He attended Broughdale Public School and Medway High School before studying music (primarily Bach's chorales and The Well-Tempered Clavier) at the University of Western Ontario. During this period, he grew increasingly frustrated with the rigidity of the classical repertoire, leading him to drop out after a year.

In 1956, he joined London band the Silhouettes. The group relocated to the Windsor/Detroit area where work was more plentiful. It was there, in 1958, that the Silhouettes joined with fellow Londoner Paul "London" Hutchins and became Paul London and the Capers. Hudson primarily played saxophone in the group, and some piano in a style inspired by Johnnie Johnson, but saw his first Lowrey organ at a show in Detroit and determined that he would get one. The group found moderate success and plenty of work, recording a few songs in Toronto in 1960, changing their name to "...Kapers" with a 'K', recording a few more songs at Chess Studios in Chicago.

Hudson was first approached by Ronnie Hawkins and Levon Helm in the summer of 1961, after a Kapers show in London, and invited to join the Hawks, an offer he declined. The Hawks persisted, and in December 1961, Hudson agreed to join the band on two conditions: that Hawkins buy him a Lowrey organ, and that he be paid an extra $10 a week ($112.69 in 2026) by each of the other band members to give music lessons to the other Hawks. This second condition was in part to justify the move to his parents, who he feared would think he was squandering his years of music education by playing in a rock and roll band. Discussing the thinking behind his early fears in The Last Waltz, Hudson told interviewer-director Martin Scorsese: "There is a view that jazz is 'evil' because it comes from evil people, but actually the greatest priests on 52nd Street and on the streets of New York City were the musicians. They were doing the greatest healing work. They knew how to punch through music that would cure and make people feel good."

When the 24-year-old Hudson joined the Hawks, the backing band for Ronnie Hawkins, the band already consisted of 21-year-old Levon Helm (drums), and 18-year-olds Robbie Robertson (guitar), Rick Danko (bass) and Richard Manuel (piano). The lineup that would become the Band was now complete.

=== Lowrey organ ===
Hudson was one of the few organ players in rock and roll and rhythm and blues to eschew a Hammond organ. Upon joining the Hawks, Hudson took the opportunity to negotiate the procurement of a new Lowrey organ as part of his compensation. The Lowrey organ offered a different mix of features, and Hudson played one with Ronnie Hawkins and the Hawks and with Bob Dylan and the Band, playing three different models: originally a Festival (FL) console, which was replaced by a Lincolnwood TSO-25 during 1969, and later still a horseshoe console H25 model, as depicted in The Last Waltz.

=== The Band: 1965–1976 ===
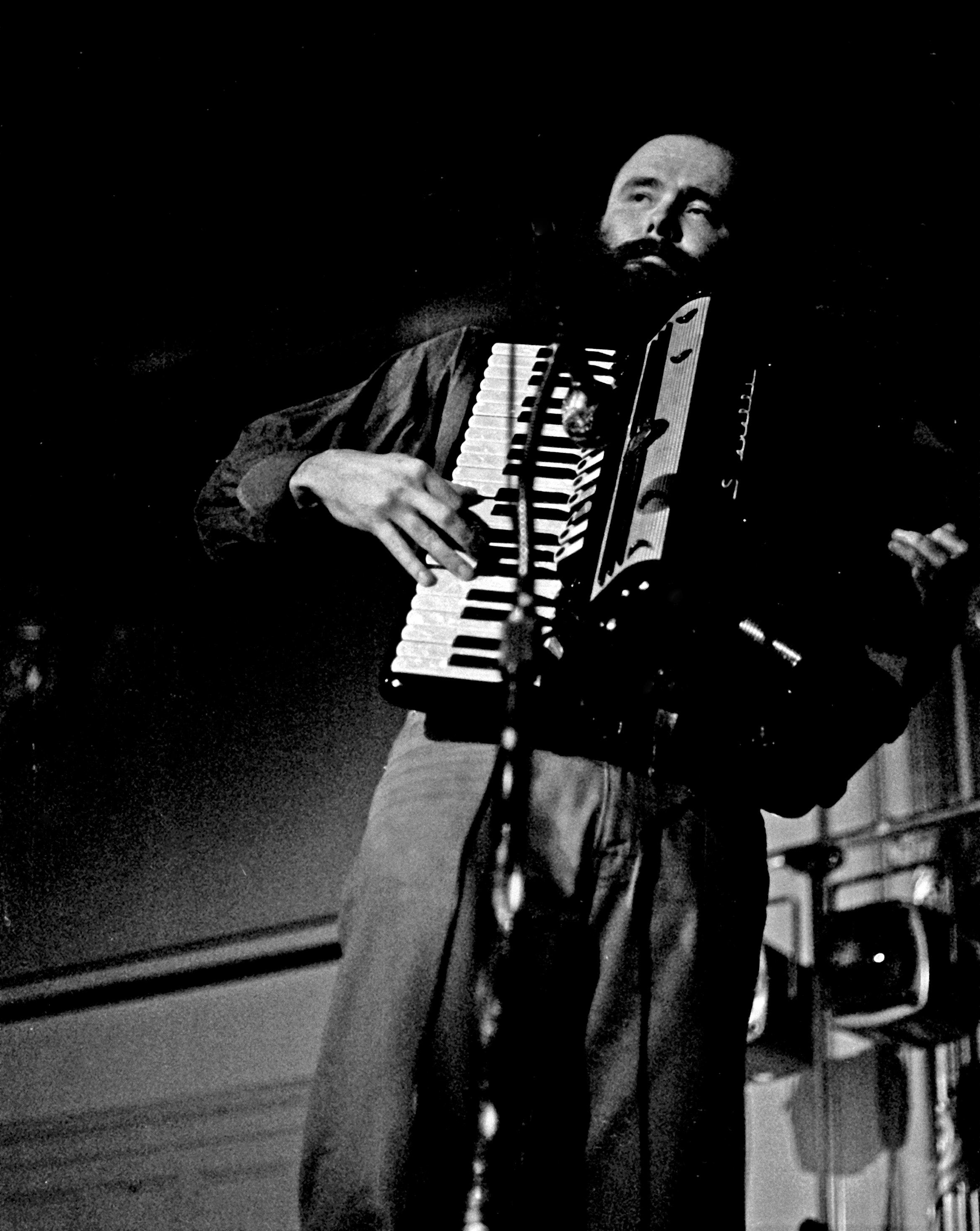
Hudson performing with the Band, Hamburg, Germany, May 1971.

Under the strict supervision of Hawkins, the Hawks became an accomplished band. They split from Hawkins in 1963, recorded two singles and toured almost continually, playing in bars and clubs, usually billed as Levon and the Hawks. Hudson started work as a session musician in 1965, playing on John Hammond Jr.'s So Many Roads along with Robertson (guitar) and Helm (drums).

In August 1965, they were introduced to Bob Dylan by manager Albert Grossman's assistant, Mary Martin. In October, Dylan and the Hawks recorded the single "Can You Please Crawl Out Your Window?" and, in January 1966, recorded material with Dylan for what would turn into the Blonde on Blonde album. Dylan recruited the band to accompany him on his controversial 1966 "electric" tour of the United States, Australia and Europe. (An album of Dylan's 1966 performance with his band, The "Royal Albert Hall" Concert, was finally released in 1998.) Subsequent to Bob Dylan's motorcycle accident in July 1966, the group settled in a pink house in West Saugerties, New York, near Woodstock. Dylan was a frequent visitor, and Hudson's recordings of their collaborations resulted in The Basement Tapes.

By 1968, the group recorded its debut album, Music from Big Pink. The album was recorded in Los Angeles (at Capitol) and New York (at A&R Studio). Capitol originally announced that the group would be called the Crackers, but when Music from Big Pink was released they were officially named the Band. The album includes Hudson's organ showcase, "Chest Fever", a song that in the Band's live shows would be vastly expanded by a solo organ introduction, entitled "The Genetic Method", an improvisational work that would be played differently at each performance. An example can be heard on The Band's performance at Woodstock, in which the organ intro was an improvisation based on Bach's Toccata and Fugue in D minor; another example can be heard on the live album Rock of Ages. Hudson was also adept at the accordion, which he played on some of the group's recordings, such as "Rockin Chair", from The Band; the traditional "Ain't No More Cane", from The Basement Tapes; Dylan's "When I Paint My Masterpiece"; and Bobby Charles's "Down South in New Orleans" during The Last Waltz. His saxophone solo work can be heard on such songs as "Tears of Rage" (from Big Pink) and "Unfaithful Servant" (from The Band). Hudson is credited with playing all of the brass and woodwinds on the studio version of "Ophelia" from the 1975 album Northern Lights - Southern Cross. This album, the first to be recorded in the Band's Shangri-La recording studio in Malibu, California, also saw Hudson adding synthesizers to his arsenal of instruments.

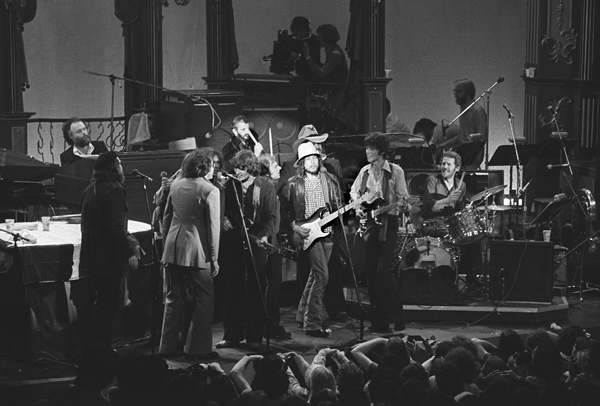
Hudson is playing organ to the left, at the Last Waltz concert in 1976

Hudson provided innovative accompaniment. For example, the song "Up on Cripple Creek" features Hudson playing a clavinet through a wah-wah pedal to create a swampy sound reminiscent of a Jew's harp or the croak of a frog. This clavinet–wah wah pedal configuration was later adopted by many funk musicians.

The initial iteration of the Band made its final bow as a touring band with a lavish final concert on Thanksgiving Day 1976 at the Winterland Ballroom in San Francisco, an all-star tribute concert documented in The Last Waltz.

=== The Band reformed: 1980s–1990s ===
The Band released one more album after the Last Waltz, Islands, and then dissolved. By then, Hudson had married his singer/actress wife, Maud. He had his own property, Big Oak Basin Dude Ranch, in Malibu, which was destroyed by wildfires in 1978, after extensive renovations that included an impressive studio.

He was active during this period as a session musician, performing on movie soundtracks and albums by many other artists, including Emmylou Harris, Van Morrison (Wavelength) and Leonard Cohen (Recent Songs). He composed music for Our Lady Queen of the Angels, a multimedia show created for the Los Angeles bicentennial in 1980. In the early 1980s he accompanied the Call on one of their albums and appeared with them in a music video which was played on MTV. He can be seen playing two separate keyboards in the Call's video for "The Walls Came Down".

The Band reformed in 1983, with all the original members except Robbie Robertson. Richard Manuel, who had lived at Hudson's ranch in 1978, died by suicide in 1986. Supplemented by a rotating roster of additional musicians, the Band continued to tour, releasing three albums in the 1990s.

In 1988, Hudson recorded "Feed the Birds" on Stay Awake: Various Interpretations of Music from Vintage Disney Films, produced by Hal Willner.

In 1990 Hudson, playing accordion and soprano saxophone, along with bandmates Levon Helm and Rick Danko, who harmonized with the vocalists, took part in Roger Waters's massive performance of The Wall at the Berlin Wall.

As a member of the Band, Hudson was inducted into the Juno Hall of Fame in 1989 and the Rock and Roll Hall of Fame in 1994. He played on various solo efforts of his bandmates Rick Danko, Levon Helm, and Robbie Robertson.

=== Solo artist: 2001–2023 ===
Hudson released his first solo album, The Sea to the North, on September 11, 2001. In 2002, with his home in foreclosure and Robertson having bought out his stake in the Band, Hudson declared bankruptcy for the third time. He continued to record and perform. On July 13, 2002, he was honoured with the Canada South Blues Society's Lifetime Achievement Award.

In 2002, he joined Burrito Deluxe, a quasi-reunion of country-rock group Flying Burrito Brothers. Other members included pedal steel player Sneaky Pete Kleinow, Carlton Moody of the Moody Brothers on lead vocals and guitars, bassist Jeff "Stick" Davis of the Amazing Rhythm Aces, and drummer Rick Lonow. The group recorded two albums, Georgia Peach and The Whole Enchilada, before Kleinow departed in 2004 because of health problems.

In 2005, Hudson formed his own 12-piece band, the Best!, with his wife, Maud on vocals. That same year, Garth and Maud Hudson released Live at the Wolf, a piano and vocal album recorded live at the Wolf Performance Hall in London, Ontario. Maud died on February 28, 2022.

On November 20, 2005, Hudson received the Hamilton Music Award for Best Instrumentalist.

He continued as a much-in-demand session player, performing with such artists as Neko Case (Fox Confessor Brings the Flood and Middle Cyclone), Chris Castle (Last Bird Home), Teddy Thompson (Separate Ways), the Secret Machines (Ten Silver Drops), the Sadies (Live 2006), the Lemonheads, Jonah Smith (2006 self-titled debut), Yesterday's News (The Northside Hotel), Billy the Kid (The Lost Cause) and others. He contributed an original electronic score to an off-Broadway production of Dragon Slayers, written by Stanley Keyes and directed by Brad Mays in 1986 at the Union Square Theatre in New York. The production was restaged with a new cast in Los Angeles in 1990.

A few of the artists Hudson performed with in 2006 are Ronnie Hawkins, the Sadies, Neko Case, Heavy Trash, John Hiatt, the North Mississippi All-Stars, Blackie and the Rodeo Kings, and Chris Zaloom, some of these performances were recorded. Hudson and his talent on piano are prominently featured in the 2007 Daniel Lanois DVD documentary Here Is What Is.

In 2010, Hudson released Garth Hudson Presents: A Canadian Celebration of the Band. The album features Canadian artists covering songs that were recorded by the Band. Hudson plays on every track and co-produced the album with Peter J. Moore. Acts that appear on the album include Neil Young, Bruce Cockburn, Blue Rodeo, Cowboy Junkies, the Trews, Great Big Sea, Hawksley Workman, Mary Margaret O'Hara, Chantal Kreviazuk, Raine Maida and Ian Thornley.

In 2012, Garth and Maud Hudson invited family and friends for a three-day party at Clubhouse Studio in Rhinebeck, New York to celebrate his 75th birthday. It went so well, they held three more over the next three years and called them the Birthday Sessions. At the time of Garth's death, audio and video materials were being prepared for release.

Garth Hudson made his final public appearance on April 16, 2023, performing in Kingston, New York, in the Flower Hill House Concert No. 6, where he played Duke Ellington‘s “Sophisticated Lady”.

=== Death ===
Hudson died in his sleep at a nursing home in Woodstock, New York, on January 21, 2025, at the age of 87. Among the many tributes, Bob Dylan wrote, “Sorry to hear the news about Garth Hudson. He was a beautiful guy and the real driving force behind the Band..."

== Awards and honours ==
=== As a solo artist ===
- Canada South Blues Society – Lifetime Achievement Award, 2002
- Hamilton Music Scene – Instrumentalist of the Year, 2005
- Dofasco Hamilton Music Awards – Lifetime of Achievement Award, 2007
- Blues Hall of Fame – inducted as a "Legendary Blues Artist", 2012
- London Music Hall Of Fame – inducted 2014
- Member of the Order of Canada, 2019

=== As a member of the Band ===
- Juno Award's Canadian Music Hall of Fame – inducted 1989
- Rock and Roll Hall of Fame – inducted 1994
- Grammy Awards – Lifetime of Achievement Award, 2008
- Canada's Walk of Fame – inducted 2014

== Discography ==
=== Albums ===
Garth Hudson studio albums
| Year | Album | Label | Note |
|---|---|---|---|
| 1980 | Music for Our Lady Queen of the Angels | Buscador Music | Cassette only release. 2005 CD reissue on Other People's Music |
| 2001 | The Sea to the North | Breeze Hill Records | Reissued by Dreamsville Records, Woodstock Records, Corazong Records |

Garth Hudson live albums
| Year | Album | Label | Note |
|---|---|---|---|
| 2005 | Live at the Wolf | Make It Real Records | With Maud Hudson |

=== Other appearances ===
Garth Hudson studio appearances
| Year | Album | Label | Note |
|---|---|---|---|
| 1988 | Stay Awake: Various Interpretations of Music from Vintage Disney Films | A&M Records | "Feed the Birds" (from "All Innocent Children Had Better Beware" medley) |
| 2010 | Garth Hudson Presents: A Canadian Celebration of the Band | Curve Music/Sony Music | all tracks |
| 2013 | The Beautiful Old: Turn-of-the-Century Songs | Doubloon Records | "The Rosary (1898)", "Till We Meet Again (1918)" |

Garth Hudson live appearances
| Year | Album | Label | Note |
|---|---|---|---|
| 2006 | The Harry Smith Project: Anthology Of American Folk Music Revisited | Shout! Factory | "No Depression in Heaven" (with Maud Hudson) |
| 2013 | Love for Levon (A Benefit to Save The Barn) | Time Life | Appears with John Prine on "When I Paint My Masterpiece" and Dierks Bentley on "Chest Fever" |

Garth Hudson guest appearances
| Year | Album | Label | Note |
|---|---|---|---|
| 1965 | So Many Roads | Vanguard Records | with John P. Hammond |
| 1975 | The Muddy Waters Woodstock Album | Chess Records | with Muddy Waters |

== Film credits ==
Hudson is credited in the following films:

- 1978 The Last Waltz (performer)
- 1980 Raging Bull (additional music composer)
- 1983 The King of Comedy (additional music)
- 1983 The Right Stuff (additional music composer)
- 1986 Man Outside (actor – Cheney/additional music)
- 1990 The Wall – Live in Berlin (performer)
- 1993 The 30th Anniversary Concert Celebration (performer)
- 2003 Festival Express (performer)
- 2008 Here Is What Is (performer)
- 2013 Love for Levon (performer)

== See also ==
- Keyboard Magazine – "Garth Hudson: Legendary Organist with '60s Supergroup the Band" December 1983
