= Jed Hilly =

American music executive

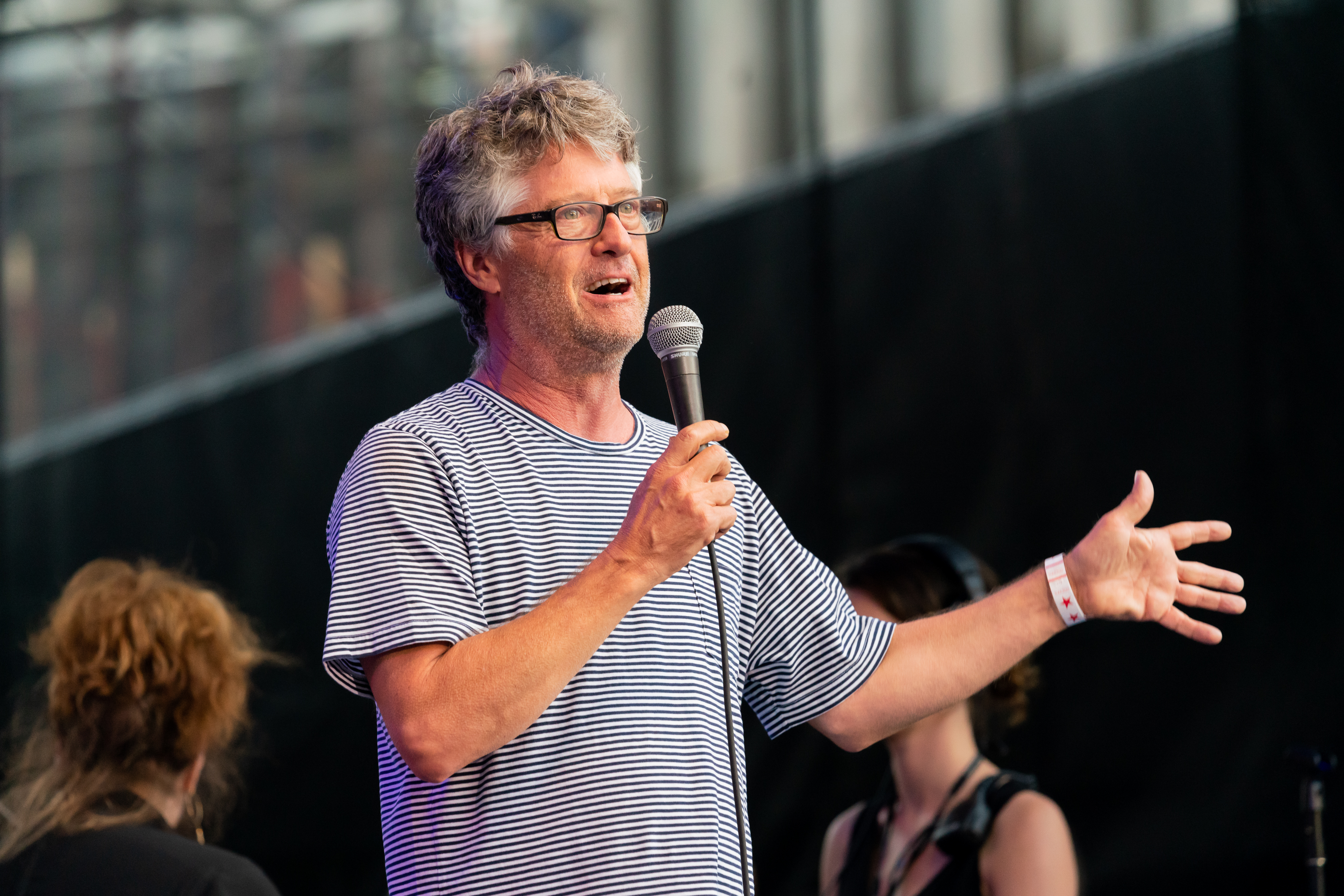
Hilly in 2019

Jed Hilly is the American Executive Director of the Americana Music Association. Hilly was formerly the vice-president of Digital Asset Management and Marketing Services at Sony Music Entertainment, Inc.

== Career ==
=== Orbison Records ===
Following the 9/11 disaster, Hilly relocated his family to Nashville, Tennessee. There he was hired by Barbara Orbison, widow of singer Roy Orbison as Vice President of Orbison Records, where he steered numerous initiatives that re-monetized the catalog of the artist. He coordinated museum exhibits and helped to produce the American Music Master Series at the Rock & Roll Hall of Fame; oversaw the campaign to encourage the US Postal Service to issue a commemorative stamp to honor Roy Orbison; and initiated numerous other projects and re-releases of the Orbison catalog that resulted in tripling sales over previous years.

=== Americana Music Association ===
In the spring of 2007, Hilly accepted the position as Executive Director of the Americana Music Association, whose mission is to foster growth of Americana music. During his tenure, expansion has been evident such as the Recording Academy’s decision (2010) to add the Americana Category to its list of Grammy Awards and in 2011, Merriam-Webster to added the word, Americana, as a musical term, to its prestigious Collegiate Dictionary.

Hilly has steered the Association to increased attendance totals at their annual Americana Music Festival and Conference and significantly, raised the profile of the genre with Rolling Stone magazine printing the Americana Music Airplay Chart, the creation of the Americana Landing Page at amazon.com and major feature stories about the genre and the organization in Billboard, the New York Times, LA Times, Wall Street Journal and hundreds of other periodicals worldwide. Hilly is the Executive Producer of the annual Americana Honors & Awards show at the Historic Ryman Auditorium, which is broadcast around the world on PBS and AXS TV along with BBC Radio 2, XM/Sirius Satellite Radio, WSM, Voice of America and NPR.org. In recent years the organization has been bolstered with ever-growing support and attendance of artists like Bonnie Raitt, John Fogerty, Robert Plant and Alison Krauss, Lyle Lovett, Steve Earle and Levon Helm (with whom Hilly produced the GRAMMY and EMMY Award-winning PBS special Levon Helm: Ramble at the Ryman). The recent success and inclusion into the Americana umbrella of new and emerging artists like the Avett Brothers, the Civil Wars, Mumford & Sons, Tift Merritt, the Lumineers and Grace Potter & the Nocturnals has broadened the scope of the Americana audience to the next generation of music loving fans.

Hilly has served on the National Association of Recording Merchandisers (NARM) and Recording Industry Association of America (RIAA) merchandising committees; the Rock & Roll Hall of Fame American Music Masters Advisory board, the Nashville Mayors Music Council and is an active member of NARM, the Recording Academy (NARAS) and the Country Music Hall of Fame.

== Personal life ==
Hilly grew up outside of New York City and on his family’s farm in Vermont. Hilly has three children and plays the bass guitar.
