= The Weight =

1968 single by The Band

- Original French single

Single by the Band

from the album Music from Big Pink
- B-side: "I Shall Be Released"
- Released: August 8, 1968
- Recorded: January 1968
- Studio: A&R Recorders (studio A), New York City
- Genre: Country rock; roots rock; folk rock
- Length: 4:34
- Label: Capitol
- Songwriter: Robbie Robertson
- Producer: John Simon

The Band singles chronology
"The Weight" (1968)	"Up on Cripple Creek" (1969)

Audio
- "The Weight" by the Band on YouTube

"The Weight" is a song by Canadian-American rock band the Band that was released as a single in 1968 and on the group's debut album Music from Big Pink. It was their first release under this name, after their previous releases as Canadian Squires and Levon and the Hawks. Written by Band member Robbie Robertson, the song is about a visitor's experiences in a town mentioned in the lyric's first line as Nazareth. "The Weight" has significantly influenced American popular music, having been listed as No. 41 on Rolling Stone's 500 Greatest Songs of All Time published in 2004. Pitchfork named it the 13th best song of the 1960s, and the Rock and Roll Hall of Fame named it one of the 500 Songs that Shaped Rock and Roll. PBS, which broadcast performances of the song on Ramble at the Ryman (2011), and Austin City Limits and Quick Hits (both 2012), describes it as "a masterpiece of Biblical allusions, enigmatic lines and iconic characters" and notes its enduring popularity as "an essential part of the American songbook."

"The Weight" is one of the Band's best known songs, gaining considerable album-oriented rock airplay even though it was not a significant hit single for the group in the US, peaking at only No. 63. After it was released, the record debuted just six days later on KHJ's "'Boss 30' records" and peaked at No. 3 there three weeks later. The Band's recording also fared well in Canada and the UK, peaking at No. 35 in Canada and No. 21 in the UK in 1968. Cash Box called it a "powerhouse performance." American Songwriter and Stereogum both ranked the song number three on their lists of the Band's greatest songs. In 1968 and 1969, three cover versions were released; their arrangements appealed to a wide diversity of music audiences.

== Composition ==
"The Weight" was written by Robbie Robertson, who found the tune by strumming idly on his guitar, a 1951 Martin D-28, when he noticed that the interior included a stamp noting that it was manufactured in Nazareth, Pennsylvania (C. F. Martin & Company is situated there), and he started crafting the lyrics as he played. The inspiration for and influences affecting the composition of "The Weight" came from the music of the American South, the life experiences of band members, particularly Levon Helm, and movies of filmmakers Ingmar Bergman and Luis Buñuel. The original members of the Band performed "The Weight" as an American Southern folk song with country music (vocals, guitars and drums) and gospel music (piano and organ) elements.

The lyrics, written in the first person, are about a traveler's arrival, visit, and departure from a town called Nazareth, in which the traveler's friend, Fanny, has asked him to look up some of her friends and send them her regards, though with each encounter, he comes away with more favors he must do, and those favors become more favors, until the weight of doing so many unexpected tasks causes him to pick up his bag and leave town altogether and return to Fanny. The singers, led by Helm, vocalize the traveler's encounters with people in the town from the perspective of a Bible Belt American Southerner, like Helm himself, a native of rural Arkansas.

The characters in "The Weight" were based on real people that members of the Band knew. According to Robertson, Fanny is based on Frances "Fanny" Steloff, the founder of a New York City bookstore where he explored scripts by Buñuel. Helm explained in his autobiography, This Wheel's on Fire that "Carmen" was from Helm's hometown, Turkey Scratch, Arkansas, "young Anna Lee" mentioned in the third verse is Helm's longtime friend Anna Lee Amsden, and, according to her, "Crazy Chester" was an eccentric resident of Fayetteville, Arkansas, who carried a cap gun. Ronnie Hawkins would tell him to "keep the peace" at his Rockwood Club when Chester arrived.

According to Robertson, "The Weight" was inspired by the surreal imagery of Buñuel's films, specifically their criticism of organized religion, particularly Catholicism. The song's lyrics and music invoke vivid imagery, the main character's perspective is influenced by the Bible, and the episodic story was inspired by the predicaments Buñuel's film characters faced that undermined their goals for maintaining or improving their moral character. Of this, Robertson once stated:

(Buñuel) did so many films on the impossibility of sainthood. People trying to be good in Viridiana and Nazarín, people trying to do their thing. In "The Weight" it's the same thing. People like Buñuel would make films that had these religious connotations to them but it wasn't necessarily a religious meaning. In Buñuel there were these people trying to be good and it's impossible to be good. In "The Weight" it was this very simple thing. Someone says, "Listen, would you do me this favour? When you get there will you say 'hello' to somebody or will you give somebody this or will you pick up one of these for me? Oh? You're going to Nazareth, that's where the Martin guitar factory is. Do me a favour when you're there." This is what it's all about. So the guy goes and one thing leads to another and it's like "Holy shit, what's this turned into? I've only come here to say 'hello' for somebody and I've got myself in this incredible predicament." It was very Buñuelish to me at the time.

== Legacy ==
In the 1969 road movie Easy Rider, the song was used as recorded by the Band, but their recording was not licensed for the later soundtrack album. To deal with this, ABC-Dunhill commissioned Smith, a band that recorded for the label at the time, to record a nearly identical cover version of the song for the soundtrack album.

Several commercials have featured the song, including one by Cingular Wireless in 2004 that led to a lawsuit from Helm against advertising agency BBDO, claiming that he did not permit them the rights to use the song. Helm lost the lawsuit in 2012, after the court ruled that Helm had signed a contract in 1968 allowing the record label to license it at their discretion. Helm's lawyer said the label had permission to promote the music, not products. The song was featured in the films Girl, Interrupted (1999), Starsky and Hutch (2004, in reference to Easy Rider, riding similar choppers, dressed in similar costumes), Dawn of the Planet of the Apes (2014), and The King of Staten Island (2020).

In Lee Cronins 2026 horror film Lee Cronin's The Mummy, the song can be heard from a car radio. Mark Kennedy from The Associated Press calls this in his movie review "perhaps the weirdest use of The Band's classic song “The Weight."

== Personnel ==
Credits are adapted from the liner notes of A Musical History.

- Levon Helm – lead and harmony vocals, drums
- Rick Danko – co-lead and harmony vocals, bass guitar
- Richard Manuel – Hammond organ, harmony vocals
- Garth Hudson – piano
- Robbie Robertson – acoustic guitar

== Songwriting credit dispute ==
The songwriting credit to Robbie Robertson for "The Weight", like credit for many of the songs performed by the Band, was disputed years later by Levon Helm. Helm insisted that the composition of the lyrics and the music was collaborative, declaring that each band member made a substantial contribution. In an interview, Helm credited Robertson with 60 percent of the lyrics, Danko and Manuel with 20 percent each of the lyrics, much of the music credit to Garth Hudson, and a small credit to himself for lyrics.

== Versions by other artists ==
External media

Audio
- "The Weight" (from The Last Waltz) by the Band featuring the Staple Singers on YouTube
- "The Weight" by Aretha Franklin on YouTube
- "The Weight" by Diana Ross & the Supremes and the Temptations on YouTube

Video
- "The Weight" (visualizer) by the Staple Singers on YouTube

- Jackie DeShannon recorded "The Weight" for her 1968 album Laurel Canyon. Released as a single, it reached number 55 on the Billboard Hot 100 on September 28, 1968.
- The Staple Singers recorded it, which was released on their 1968 album Soul Folk in Action. Later, as part of the production of the concert film The Last Waltz, the group recorded a performance of the song with the Band, and the song has continued to be closely associated with Mavis Staples. The Staple Singers performed the song with Marty Stuart for the 1994 compilation album Rhythm, Country and Blues, which paired country singers with R&B singers.
- Aretha Franklin released a cover of "The Weight" in 1969, with Duane Allman on slide guitar, that reached number 19 on the Billboard Hot 100 and number three on its Rhythm & Blues Singles chart on March 29, 1969. It also reached number 10 on the Cashbox Top 100. The song is included on her 1970 album This Girl's in Love with You.
- In 1969, Diana Ross & the Supremes and the Temptations recorded a version of "The Weight" for their album Together. Released as a single, it appeared on several charts, including numbers 46 on Billboard magazine's Hot 100 and 33 on its Best Selling Soul Singles charts. (Note: Also reached No. 36 in Canada, No. 39 on U.S. Cashbox Top 100, No. 37 on U.S. Record World 100 Top Pops, and No. 21 on U.S. Record World Top 50 R&B.)
- Australian rock musician Jimmy Barnes recorded a cover of "The Weight" with Australian band the Badloves for his seventh studio album, Flesh and Wood (1993). Released as a single on November 8, 1993, this version peaked at number six on the Australian ARIA Singles Chart for four weeks in 1993 and 1994. It was Australia's 83rd-best-selling single of 1993.
- The Grateful Dead began performing "The Weight" during their live shows in 1990, debuting the song on March 28, 1990, at the Nassau Veterans Memorial Coliseum in Uniondale, New York. Over the next five years, they performed the song 41 times. Their final rendition took place on March 23, 1995, at the Charlotte Coliseum in Charlotte, North Carolina.
- In 2006, Canadian country music artist Aaron Pritchett covered "The Weight" on his album Big Wheel. It was released as a single and reached number six on the Billboard Canada Country chart, and number 90 on the Canadian Hot 100.
- Weezer covered "The Weight" as an international bonus track for their 2008 self-titled album.
- In September 2019, Robertson and Ringo Starr, along with musicians from four continents, compiled an eclectic version of "The Weight" for Playing for Change.
