= Amy Helm =

American singer-songwriter

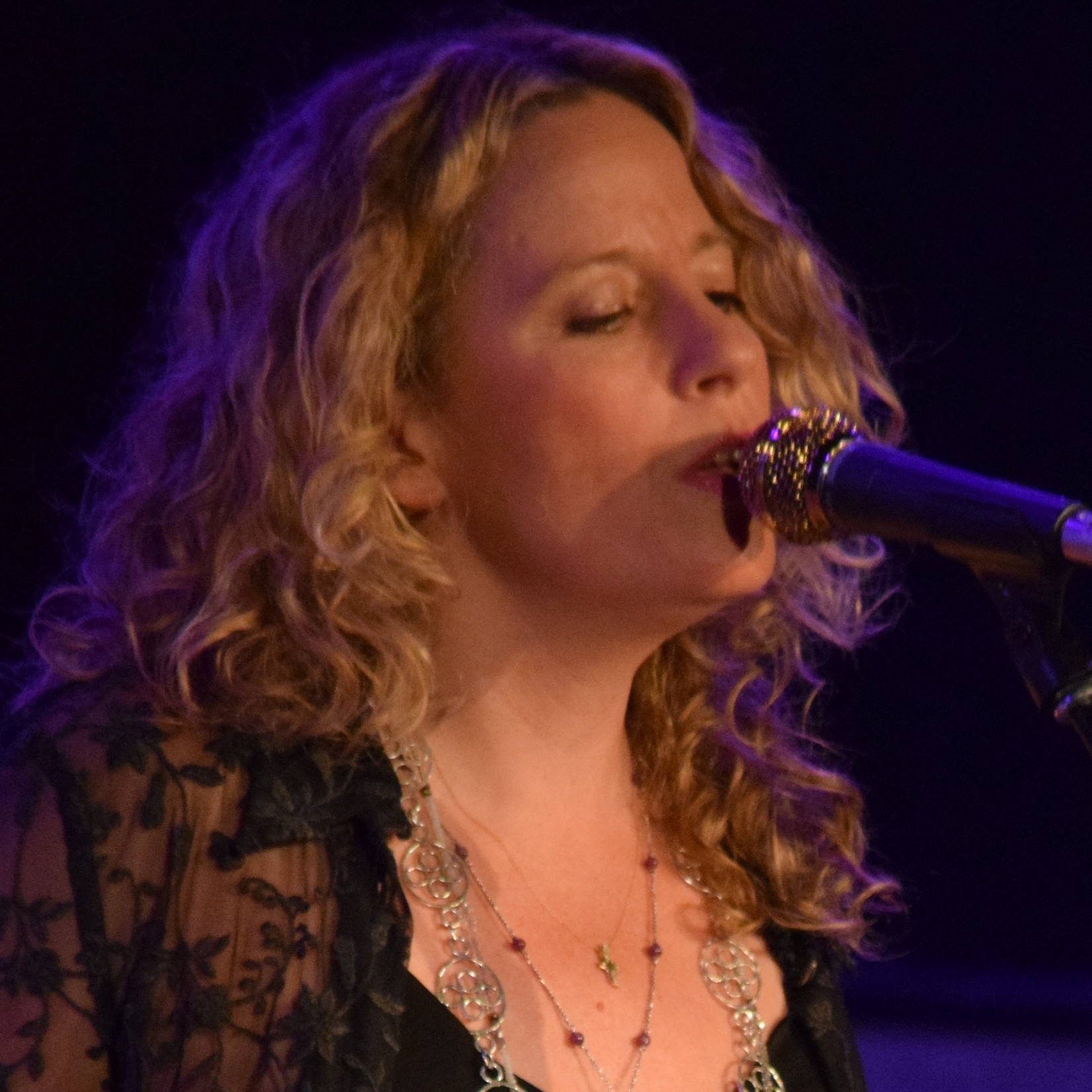
- Helm in 2015

Background information
- Born: Amy Helm; December 3, 1970 (age 55); Woodstock, New York, U.S.
- Genres: Folk rock, folk, rock, blues, country, Americana
- Occupations: Musician, producer, artist
- Instruments: Vocals, guitar, mandolin, bass, drums, whistler
- Years active: 1997–present
- Spouse: Jay Collins (m. 2007, divorced)
- Website: www.amyhelm.com

Amy Helm (born December 3, 1970) is an American singer-songwriter and musician. She is the daughter of drummer Levon Helm and singer Libby Titus. She is a past member of the Levon Helm's Midnight Ramble Band and Ollabelle, as well as her own touring band.

Her debut solo album, Didn’t It Rain, was released in July 2015, and her second release This Too Shall Light was released September 2018 on Yep Roc Records.

Helm conducted an in-depth interview about her life and career with The Pods & Sods Network in 2016. That year she and her band performed at the Edmonton Folk Music Festival.

== Early life ==
Helm was born in Woodstock, New York, and spent her childhood between Woodstock, Los Angeles, California and Manhattan, New York. She attended Trinity High School in the Upper West Side neighborhood of Manhattan where she studied jazz with Aaron Bell, while singing in bands, playing in New York City clubs and bars.

== Music career ==
In 1999, Helm joined her father in his blues band The Barn Burners. They toured the country playing traditional blues music.

In 2001, she was a co-founding member of alt-country ensemble Ollabelle, which toured and recorded for 10 years, releasing three critically acclaimed albums, Ollabelle (2004), Riverside Battle Songs (2006), and Neon Blue Bird (2011).

In 2004, she and her father built the Midnight Ramble concerts at his home in Woodstock, New York. The concerts began as a rent party and grew into a Woodstock institution, featuring artists such as Emmylou Harris, Allen Toussaint, Elvis Costello, Phil Lesh, and many others.

Growing out of the Midnight Rambles, Levon Helm recorded his first album in 25 years, Dirt Farmer, which was produced by Amy and Larry Campbell. Dirt Farmer went on to win the Grammy award for Best Traditional Folk Album in February 2008. In 2009, they recorded Electric Dirt, which won the first-ever Grammy award for Best Americana Album in 2010. She also was a part of the live album Ramble at the Ryman, recorded in 2008 at the Ryman Auditorium in Nashville. This album won the 2012 Grammy award for Best Americana Album.

Helm has extensive credits as a background vocalist and whistler on records by artists such as Steely Dan, Mercury Rev, Linda Thompson, William Bell, Rich Robinson, and Rosanne Cash.

In 2015, she released her first solo album, Didn't It Rain which featured her father's last recorded drum performances. The album also featured members of the Midnight Ramble Band and Amy's touring band, as well as other players and singers such as John Medeski, Bill Payne, and Catherine Russell.

In 2017, Helm recorded her second album with producer Joe Henry in Los Angeles. The album features musicians Doyle Bramhall II, Tyler Chester, Jen Condos, and Jay Bellerose, as well as a background vocal section consisting of Allison Russell, JT Nero, and Adam Minkoff. The album, entitled This Too Shall Light, was released on September 21, 2018 on Yep Roc Records. The album's title track premiered on Rolling Stone Country.

== Personal life ==
Helm resides in Woodstock, New York. She is the stepdaughter of Donald Fagen from the band Steely Dan through his marriage to Libby Titus in 1993.

== Discography ==
=== Studio albums ===
- Didn’t It Rain (eOne, 2015)
- This Too Shall Light (Yep Rock, 2018)
- What the Flood Leaves Behind (Renew, 2021)
- Silver City (Sun Records, 2024)

=== As guest ===
With Levon Helm

- Souvenir, Vol. 1 (1998)
- The Midnight Ramble Sessions Vol. 2 (2005)
- Dirt Farmer (2007)
- Angels Serenade (2008)
- Electric Dirt (2009)
- Ramble at the Ryman (2011)
- It's Showtime: The Midnight Ramble Sessions Vol. 3 (2014)

With Ollabelle

- Olabelle (2004)
- Riverside Battle Songs (2006)
- Before This Time (2008)
- Neon Blue Bird (2011)

With others

- Matt Andersen, Coal Mining Blues (2011)
- Matt Andersen, Weightless (2014)
- Marcia Ball, The Tattooed Lady and the Alligator Man (2014)
- The Band, Jubilation (1998)
- William Bell, This Is Where I Live (2016)
- Blackie and the Rodeo Kings, Kings and Queens (2011)
- Tracy Bonham, Wax & Gold (2015)
- Larry Campbell & Teresa Williams, Larry Campbell & Teresa Williams (2015)
- Laura Cantrell, Humming by the Flowered Vine (2005)
- Rosanne Cash, The River & The Thread (2014)
- Sean Costello, Sean Costello (2004)
- Danielia Cotton, The Real Book (2014)
- Donna the Buffalo, Silverlined (2008)
- Donald Fagen, Kamakiriad (1993)
- Donald Fagen, Morph the Cat (2006)
- The Holmes Brothers, State of Grace (2007)
- Christine Lavin, I Was in Love with a Difficult Man (2002)
- Colin Linden, Rich in Love (2015)
- Mercury Rev, Deserter's Songs (1998)
- Mercury Rev, All Is Dream (2001)
- Elizabeth Mitchell, Sunny Day (2010)
- Arlen Roth, Toolin' Around Woodstock (2008)
- Shivaree, Rough Dreams (2002)
- Shivaree, Who's Got Trouble? (2005)
- Steely Dan, Two Against Nature (2000)
- Ben Sidran, Dylan Different (2009)
- Chris Smither, Leave the Light On (2006)
- Alexis P. Suter, Live at the Midnight Ramble (2007)
- Linda Thompson, Won't Be Long Now (2013)
- Trans-Siberian Orchestra, The Lost Christmas Eve (2004)
- Various Artists, The Lost Notebooks of Hank Williams (2011)
- Various Artists, Treasure of the Broken Land: The Songs of Mark Heard (2017)
- Kenny White, Symphony in 16 Bars (2004)
