= Whitey Morgan and the 78's (album) =

Studio album by Whitey Morgan and the 78's
- Released: October 12, 2010
- Recorded: December 2009 & January 2010; Levon Helm Studios, Woodstock, NY
- Genre: Country, outlaw country, honky tonk
- Label: Bloodshot Records

Whitey Morgan and the 78's chronology
| Honky Tonks and Cheap Motels (2008) | Whitey Morgan and the 78's (2010) | Sonic Ranch (2015) |

Whitey Morgan and the 78's is the second studio album by Whitey Morgan and the 78's.

== Recording history ==
It was recorded in December 2009 and January 2010 at Levon Helm's studio in Woodstock, New York. The band members at the time of recording included Whitey Morgan (Eric David Allen) on vocals, acoustic and electric guitar, Benny James Vermelyen on guitar and vocals, Tamineh Gueramy on fiddle, Jeremy Mackinder on bass, and Mike Popovich on drums. Guest musicians on the album include multi-instrumentalist Larry Campbell performing pedal steel guitar on two tracks. The album was released in the United States on October 12, 2010, and it debuted at #64 on the Billboard Country Album Charts.

== Artistic production ==
The album design, layout, and photography was done by Mike Popovich.

== Track listing ==
1. Bad News (John D. Loudermilk)
2. Turn Up the Bottle
3. Memories Cost A Lot (Billy Don Burns)
4. Buick City
5. Meanest Jukebox in Town (Johnny Paycheck)
6. Cheaters Always Lose
7. Hard Scratch Pride
8. Honky Tonk Queen
9. Where Do Ya Want It? (Dale Watson)
10. I Ain't Drunk
11. Long Road Home

== Reviews ==
Professional ratings
Review scores
| Source | Rating |
|---|---|
| AllMusic | 4/5 stars |

Thom Jurek at AllMusic wrote, "The highest points here are Morgan's own songs: they are disciplined, often clever, and always written to be played by this particular band live and without compromise." Furthermore, the album earned four out of five stars in the All Music rating system. Country Music Chicago heralds Whitey Morgan as a "country music's next renaissance man" in a January 2011 article.

== Chart performance ==
| Chart (2010) | Peak position |
|---|---|
| U.S. Billboard Top Country Albums | 64 |
| U.S. Billboard Top Heatseekers | 48 |
