= Ramble at the Ryman =

Live album by Levon Helm
- Released: May 17, 2011
- Recorded: September 17, 2008
- Genres: Americana, country rock, roots rock
- Length: 70:47
- Label: Vanguard Records
- Producer: Larry Campbell

Levon Helm chronology
| Electric Dirt (2009) | Ramble at the Ryman (2011) |

Professional ratings
Aggregate scores
| Source | Rating |
|---|---|
| Metacritic | 82/100 |
Review scores
| Source | Rating |
| AllMusic | 4/5 stars |
| All About Jazz | 4.5/5 stars |
| Paste | 8.5/10 |
| PopMatters | 7/10 |
| Q | 4/5 stars |
| Record Collector | 4/5 stars |
| Uncut | 4/5 stars |

Ramble at the Ryman is a 2011 live album recorded by American rock multi-instrumentalist Levon Helm during his September 17, 2008 performance at Nashville's Ryman Auditorium. The performance kicked off the beginning of the Americana Music Festival & Conference. The album features six songs by The Band and other cover material, including songs from previous Helm solo releases. Helm's band is led by multi-instrumentalist Larry Campbell and Helm's daughter, vocalist and mandolinist Amy Helm.

The performance recorded for the album is a traveling version of Helm's Midnight Ramble, usually held at his home and studio in Woodstock, New York.

The album won the 2012 Grammy Award for Best Americana Album. Helm previously won this award for his 2009 studio album Electric Dirt.

== Track listing ==
| No. | Title | Writer(s) | Length |
|---|---|---|---|
| 1. | "Ophelia" | Robbie Robertson | 3:58 |
| 2. | "Back to Memphis" | Chuck Berry | 4:54 |
| 3. | "Fannie Mae" | Ronnie Hawkins | 3:33 |
| 4. | "Baby Scratch My Back" | Slim Harpo | 4:13 |
| 5. | "Evangeline" | Robertson | 3:31 |
| 6. | "No Depression in Heaven" | A.P. Carter or James David Vaughan | 4:01 |
| 7. | "Wide River to Cross" | Buddy Miller, Julie Miller | 4:44 |
| 8. | "Deep Elem Blues" | Traditional | 7:12 |
| 9. | "Anna Lee" | Laurelyn Dossett | 4:02 |
| 10. | "Rag Mama Rag" | Robertson | 4:21 |
| 11. | "Time Out for the Blues" | Dan Hart, Buddy Starcher | 2:44 |
| 12. | "A Train Robbery" | Paul Kennerley | 5:41 |
| 13. | "The Shape I’m In" | Robertson | 4:43 |
| 14. | "Chest Fever" | Robertson | 7:03 |
| 15. | "The Weight" | Robertson | 6:14 |

== Personnel ==
- Levon Helm – vocals, mandolin, drums
- Larry Campbell – acoustic guitar, electric guitar, fiddle, mandolin, vocals
- Teresa Williams – acoustic guitar, vocals
- Paul Ossola – bass
- Tony Leone – drums
- Amy Helm – mandolin, drums, vocals
- Brian Mitchell – organ, piano, accordion, vocals
- George Receli – percussion
- Erik Lawrence – saxophone
- Jay Collins – saxophone
- Clark Gaytons – trombone, tuba
- Steven Bernstein – trumpet
- Billy Bob Thornton – vocals
- John Hiatt – vocals, acoustic guitar
- Sheryl Crow – vocals, autoharp
- Buddy Miller – vocals, guitar
- Sammy Davis – vocals, harmonica
- Sam Bush – vocals, mandolin
- Richard Dodd – mastering
- Justin Guip – mixing
- Michael Davis – mixing
- Carrie Smith – art direction
- Paul Laraia – cover photograph
- Barbara O'Brien – associate producer
- John O'Neill – associate producer
