= Chris Castle =

American singer-songwriter

- Castle in 2019

Background information
- Born: Chris Castle; January 29, 1976 (age 50)
- Origin: Sandusky, Ohio, United States
- Genres: Folk
- Occupation: Singer-songwriter community activist politician
- Instruments: Vocals; Guitar harmonica
- Years active: 1994–present

Chris Castle (born January 29, 1976) is an American folk/Americana singer-songwriter.

== Early life ==
Castle was born in Sandusky, Ohio, and his family moved to New London around the time he was four. His parents had migrated to Ohio from eastern Kentucky in the late sixties, and Castle was exposed to Appalachian Music from a very early age. His father (a Vietnam War veteran) committed suicide when Castle was nine years old; a theme that would later inspire Castle's first official single and video, Both Ends of A Gun.

== Early career ==
Castle spent his teen years as a staff-writer in Nashville, Tennessee, working under such notable writers as Casey Kelly, Wood Newton, and Earl Bud Lee. At twenty-one, he would leave Music Row to again perform in bars and coffeehouses in northern Ohio.

Castle enrolled in Bowling Green State University as a political science major, where he met Pulitzer Prize winner Edward Albee in 2006. The veteran playwright convinced him to return to songwriting and Chris began crafting the songs that would become Hollow Bones in Monotone. "He's the one who talked me into dropping out of college, so I can blame it on (him). He was telling me about holding up a mirror to our society and holding it up to yourself. He had great stuff to say about real art."

== As a recording artist ==
Castle's 2007 release, Hollow Bones in Monotone, established him at Americana/Folk radio and allowed him to tour more extensively throughout the US. That same year, Castle was named featured artist at Folk Alley, in addition to being a finalist in the Granite State Songwriting Contest, in Newmarket, New Hampshire.

In January 2012, Castle released Last Bird Home through his own record label, Dirtsandwich Music Company. Dirtsandwich also served as Castle's publishing arm, and was a BMI-affiliated limited-liability corporation. The album was recorded and in 2011 at Levon Helm Studios in Woodstock, New York. Contributing to the performances were The Band's Garth Hudson, Maud Hudson, Tommy Ramone of the Ramones, Gabriel Butterfield (son of Blues musician Paul Butterfield) and The Womack Family Band, among others. Last Bird Home marked the first chart success of Chris Castle's long career.

Castle returned to performing in October 2019, releasing his first collection of new songs in nearly a decade. "Still Portrait Of A Spinning Wheel" was released on October 4 at Cleveland's Beachland Ballroom and Tavern. In June of 2023, he returned to Woodstock to join producer Larry Campbell, engineer Justin Guip, and bassist Brandon Morrison at Milan Hill Studios to record Long Way to the Bottom, his first full-length album in more than ten years. The ten song LP includes material written between 2006 and 2023, and prominently features Campbell's string work on guitars, mandolin, fiddle, and pedal steel.

The New London Day's Rick Koster calls Castle "a tunesmith of almost scary vision, narrative acumen and hooky instinct".

== Community leadership ==
Castle began focusing his energies on the city of Norwalk as a whole, through his Imagine Norwalk campaign. Imagine Norwalk hosted several community-wide events throughout the summer of 2014 and 2015, which bolstered the local economy and garnered an exciting degree of citizen participation. The program was adopted by the Norwalk Economic Development Corporation in April 2015, and was presented the Ohio Art Education Association's "Distinguished Business/Organization for Art Education" award for north central Ohio the following October.

Castle was honored in October 2014 by Norwalk City Council and both the Ohio House of Representatives and the Ohio Senate. The Norwalk Economic Development Corporation (NEDC) recognized Castle and Imagine Norwalk with their 2014 "Innovation Award".

In April 2015, Castle was named Assistant Director for the Norwalk Economic Development Corporation (NEDC) where he focused on the Norwalk area's business attraction, retention and expansion efforts. That same year, he was elected to Norwalk City Council, garnering 58% of ward four votes, beginning a four-year term in January 2016.

In March 2017, Castle co-sponsored legislation with at-large Councilman Kelly Beck, which would have legalized medical marijuana cultivation within the city of Norwalk. The ordinance passed in a 4–3 vote but was quickly vetoed by Norwalk Mayor Rob Duncan.

In June 2017, Castle began producing and co-hosting a Norwalk-centric video podcast called The Maple City Minute with fellow Norwalk City Council member Samantha Ludwig Wilhelm. He resigned from his position at the Norwalk Economic Development Corporation in September 2017, to re-focus his energies on the podcast and on the wider-reaching goal of overall community development.

== Discography ==
Title	Album details	Peak chart positions				
Title	Album details	Roots Music Report	Roots 66	Freeform American Roots	AMA Internet Chart	AMA Terrestrial Chart
Hollow Bones in Monotone	Release date: July 7, 2007; Label: self-released; Formats: CD, music download	—	—	—	—	—
Songbook Volume I	Release date: September 9, 2009; Label: self-released; Formats: CD, music download	—	—	—	—	—
Of God & Man	Release date: June 25, 2011; Label: Dirtsandwich Music Company; Formats: CD, music download	—	—	—	—	—
Last Bird Home	Release date: January 12, 2012; Label: Dirtsandwich Music Company; Formats: CD, music download	5	7	26	26	73
Still Portrait Of A Spinning Wheel	Release date: October 1, 2019; Label: self-released; Formats: CD, music download	—	—	—	—	—
Long Way to the Bottom	Release date: May 17, 2024; Label: Dirtsandwich Music Company; Formats: CD, music download	—	—	—	—	—
"—" denotes releases that did not chart
