= American Son (album) =

Studio album by Levon Helm
- Released: 1980
- Studio: Bradley's Barn, Mount Juliet, Tennessee
- Genre: Country rock
- Length: 35:20
- Label: MCA
- Producer: Fred Carter, Jr.

Levon Helm chronology
Levon Helm (1978)	American Son (1980)	Levon Helm (1982)

Professional ratings
Review scores
Source	Rating
Allmusic	4.5/5 stars
Rolling Stone	favorable

American Son is a studio album by American country rock musician Levon Helm, who is most famous for his work as drummer for the rock group the Band. It was released in October 1980 on MCA Records and was Helm's third studio album. It had generally been considered Levon Helm's best solo work until the release of Dirt Farmer in 2007.

== Background ==
Helm played the part of Loretta Lynn's father in the 1980 film Coal Miner's Daughter and was asked to record a version of Bill Monroe's "Blue Moon of Kentucky" for the film's soundtrack. The session went well, and producer Fred Carter, Jr., decided to cut more tracks. Using a band of veteran Nashville session players, Carter and Helm recorded 20 tracks over two weeks, half of which ended up on American Son.

== Critical reception ==
Billboard's reviewers noted that the album was more rock-like than country-like and pleasant to listen to. The authors also suggested that due to the success of the film, which starred Levon Helm, sales of the disc would be high.

== Track listing ==
1. "Watermelon Time in Georgia" (Harlan Howard) – 3:53
2. "Dance Me Down Easy" (Larry Henley, Billy Burnette) – 2:51
3. "Violet Eyes" (Tom Kimmel) – 3:10
4. "Stay with Me" (Fred Carter) – 3:03
5. "America's Farm" (Ronnie Rogers) – 3:09
6. "Hurricane" (Keith Stegall, Stewart Harris, Thom Schuyler) – 4:04
7. "China Girl" (Joe New, Jeff Silbar) – 3:19
8. "Nashville Wimmin" (Howard) – 4:13
9. "Blue House of Broken Hearts" (Bill Martin, Todd Cerney) – 3:29
10. "Sweet Peach Georgia Wine" (Ronnie Reynolds) – 3:51

== Personnel ==
- Levon Helm – drums, vocals, backing vocals, harmonica
- Jerry Shook – guitar, mandolin
- Buddy Emmons – steel guitar
- Kenneth Buttrey – drums
- Jerry Carrigan – drums
- Hargus "Pig" Robbins – piano, electric piano
- Bobby Ogdin – organ, electric piano
- Billy Sanford – guitar
- Henry Strzelecki – bass, backing vocals
- Mitch Humphries – organ, backing vocals
- Steve Gibson – guitar, electric guitar
- Steve Schaffer – bass
- Clifford Robertson – organ
- Beegie Adair – piano
- Todd Cerney – backing vocals
- Buzz Cason – backing vocals
- Buster Phillips – drums

=== Technical personnel ===
- Jim Foglesong – executive producer
- Fred Carter, Jr. – producer, arranger, guitar, backing vocals
- Joe Mills – engineer
- Ernie Winfrey – engineer
- Bobby Bradley – assistant engineer
- George Osaki – art direction
- Andy Engel – design
- Joo Chung – cover illustration

== Chart performance ==
Chart (1980)	Peak position
Canadian RPM Country Albums	24
