= Electric Dirt =

Studio album by Levon Helm
- Released: June 30, 2009
- Studio: Levon Helm Studio, Woodstock, New York
- Genre: Roots rock, country rock, Americana, R&B
- Length: 43 min
- Label: Dirt Farmer/Vanguard
- Producer: Larry Campbell

Levon Helm chronology
Dirt Farmer (2007)	Electric Dirt (2009)

Professional ratings
Aggregate scores
Source	Rating
Metacritic	84/100
Review scores
Source	Rating
AllMusic	4/5 stars
The Boston Phoenix	3.5/4 stars
Entertainment Weekly	B+
Los Angeles Times	3.5/4 stars
Mojo	4/5 stars
PopMatters	8/10
Record Collector	4/5 stars
Rolling Stone	4/5 stars
Slant Magazine	3.5/5 stars
Uncut	4/5 stars

Electric Dirt is the final studio album from American musician Levon Helm, released in 2009. It is the follow-up to his Grammy-winning 2007 album Dirt Farmer. In Uncut's list of the 150 best albums between 2000 through 2009, Electric Dirt was listed 80th. It won the first ever Grammy Award for Best Americana Album, an inaugural category in 2010. The track "Growin' Trade", cowritten with Larry Campbell, was Helm's first cowritten song since his debut solo album, Levon Helm & the RCO All-Stars.

== Track listing ==
1. "Tennessee Jed" (Jerry Garcia, Robert Hunter) – 5:58
2. "Move Along Train" (Roebuck Staples) – 3:22
3. "Growin' Trade" (Levon Helm, Larry Campbell) – 4:22
4. "Golden Bird" (Happy Traum) – 5:11
5. "Stuff You Gotta Watch" (Muddy Waters) – 3:38
6. "White Dove" (Carter Stanley) – 3:29
7. "Kingfish" (Randy Newman) – 4:24
8. "You Can’t Lose What You Ain’t Never Had" (Muddy Waters) – 4:01
9. "When I Go Away" (Larry Campbell) – 4:32
10. "Heaven’s Pearls" (Anthony Leone, Byron Isaacs, Fiona McBain, Amy Helm, Glenn Patscha) – 4:09
11. "I Wish I Knew How It Would Feel to Be Free" (Richard Carroll Lamp, Willy E. Taylor) – 3:25

iTunes bonus tracks

12. "That's Alright" (Arthur Crudup) – 4:53 (from Souvenir Vol. 1)
13. "Ashes of Love" (Jack Anglin, Johnnie Wright, Jim Anglin) - 3:57

== Personnel ==
- Levon Helm - lead vocals, mandolin
- Larry Campbell - producer, guitars, violin, backing vocals
- Amy Helm - backing vocals
- Theresa Williams - backing vocals
- Jim Weider - guitar
- Brian Mitchell - keyboards
- Howard Johnson - Baritone sax, Tuba
- Clark Gayton - trombone
- Jay Collins - tenor sax
- Erik Lawrence - saxophones
- Steve Bernstein - trumpet
- Byron Isaacs - bass

== Production notes ==
- Cover art conception: Levon Helm
- Cover art production: Michael (Mike) DuBois
- Photos: Ahron R. Foster
- Layout and design: Carrie Smith
