= Fred Carter Jr. =

American singer and guitarist (1933–2010)

- Playing at the Station Inn in 1983

Background information
- Born: Fred F. Carter Jr. December 31, 1933; Winnsboro, Louisiana, U.S.
- Died: July 17, 2010 (aged 76) Nashville, Tennessee, U.S.
- Occupations: Musician, producer, singer, composer
- Instruments: Guitar, mandolin, bass, vocals
- Years active: 1950s–2008

Fred F. Carter Jr. (December 31, 1933 – July 17, 2010) was an American guitarist, singer, producer and composer.

== Early career ==
Carter was raised in the delta country in Winnsboro, the seat of Franklin Parish in northeastern Louisiana, United States. Carter grew up with the musical influences of jazz, country & western, hymns, and blues. His first instrument was the mandolin which he began playing at the age of three. He later began playing fiddle. While in the Air Force in his late teens, he was the bandleader for the USO variety show entertaining troops across Europe. His bunkmate during the tour was the MC and fellow serviceman Larry Hagman, who went on to television fame. After leaving the Air Force, Carter attended Centenary Music College on scholarship as a violist despite the fact he could not read music, but instead had to memorize all of his orchestral pieces.

After leaving Centenary, Carter began his professional career in the 1950s, his first partner in music was another Franklin Parish native, Allen "Puddler" Harris. He started taking up guitar seriously in his early 20s and became a principal on the Louisiana Hayride. While on the Hayride, he formed lifelong friendships with many musicians including Slim Whitman, Floyd Cramer, Sonny James, Hank Snow, Faron Young, Johnny Horton, Jim Reeves and many others. Carter met Roy Orbison during this time and became part of his band and moved to Hollywood with him. Later, he worked with Orbison in Nashville on the Monument Sessions, being heard on "Dream Baby" as the opening guitar. He subsequently worked with Dale Hawkins of "Suzie Q" song fame, and then joined Dale's cousin Ronnie Hawkins whose group, The Hawks, later became The Band, (sans Hawkins). During this busy and formative time, Carter also toured and became lifelong friends with Conway Twitty.

In the early 1960s, Carter settled into the Nashville session scene. He quickly earned a place as part of Nashville's 'A Team'. His discography for the next three decades is extensive and wide-ranging: Carter played guitar and mandolin for two of Joan Baez's albums in the late 1960s. He then worked on Simon and Garfunkel's Bridge over Troubled Water. Notably, Carter provide numerous memorable guitar performances including five guitar parts for "The Boxer" by Simon and Garfunkel, "I'm Just an Old Chunk of Coal (But I'm Gonna Be a Diamond Someday)" by John Anderson, "I've Always Been Crazy" and "Whistlers and Jugglers" by Waylon Jennings. He also played guitar and bass on the Bob Dylan albums Self Portrait and Nashville Skyline; as well as on the Connie Francis hit single, "The Wedding Cake". During this time Carter was also a member of the supergroup Levon Helm and the RCO All Stars, composed of Levon Helm, Booker T. Jones, Dr. John, Donald "Duck" Dunn, and the Saturday Night Live horns.

== Later career ==
Carter owned Nugget Records in Goodlettsville, Tennessee, for many years. Songs including Jessi Colter's "I'm Not Lisa", were originally recorded at Nugget. Willie Nelson recut his famed Phases and Stages album with Carter at Nugget, after Nelson expressed dissatisfaction with the first version of the album cut in Muscle Shoals, Alabama.

Production credits for Carter include Levon Helm's American Son album on MCA Records, and Bobby Bridger's "Heal in the Wisdom". He helped Dolly Parton and Tanya Tucker land their first record deals.

Carter was a member of the band Levon Helm and The RCO All-Stars. This band was composed of Helm, Carter, Steve Cropper, Booker T. Jones, Donald "Duck" Dunn, Dr. John, Paul Butterfield, and the NBC Saturday Night Live horns. Carter also played with Helm on The Muddy Waters Woodstock Album with Garth Hudson, Paul Butterfield, Bob Margolin, Pinetop Perkins Howard Johnson (on sax)

He played the fiddle, when Sissy Spacek performed the song "Some small Crime", written by her, together with Levon Helm in the 1980 TV show The Midnight Special. He also played guitar and mandolin in that Midnight Special episode on more songs from the 1980 movie Coal Miner's Daughter

He had small roles in several films including The Adventures of Huck Finn starring Elijah Wood.

Carter's daughter is singer Deana Carter.

In 2008, he was profiled in an extensive article in Fretboard Journal, written by music journalist and historian Rich Kienzle.

Carter died on July 17, 2010, at Vanderbilt University Medical Center in Nashville, following a stroke.

== As sideman ==
- Sounds of Silence - Simon & Garfunkel (1966)
- Any Day Now - Joan Baez (1968)
- Nashville - Ian & Sylvia (1968)
- David's Album - Joan Baez (1969)
- Bridge over Troubled Water - Simon & Garfunkel (1970)
- Rock and Roll Resurrection - Ronnie Hawkins (1972)
- Angel Clare - Art Garfunkel (1973)
- Giant of Rock 'n' Roll - Ronnie Hawkins (1974)
- The Muddy Waters Woodstock Album (bass, guitar) - Muddy Waters (1976)
- Kenny Rogers - Kenny Rogers (1976)
- Love Lifted Me - Kenny Rogers (1976)
- Levon Helm & the RCO All-Stars - Levon Helm (1977)
- Love or Something Like It - Kenny Rogers (1978)
- American Son - Levon Helm (1980)

== Honors ==
A highway marker was placed in Carter's hometown of Winnsboro, Louisiana, honoring him on Saturday, January 29, 2022, by the Northeast Louisiana Music Trail.
