= Levon Helm (1982 album) =

Studio album by Levon Helm
- Released: 1982
- Recorded: 1981
- Studio: Muscle Shoals Sound Studio
- Label: Capitol
- Producer: Barry Beckett, Jimmy Johnson

Levon Helm chronology
American Son (1980)	Levon Helm (1982)	Dirt Farmer (2007)

Professional ratings
Review scores
Source	Rating
AllMusic	3/5 stars

Levon Helm is a 1982 album by Levon Helm. It was his second eponymous album and his last studio album until Dirt Farmer, released in 2007.

== Track list ==
1. "You Can't Win 'Em All" (Andy Bown, Tony Chapman)
2. "Lucrecia" (Richard Supa)
3. "Even a Fool Would Let Go" (Kerry Chater, Tom Snow)
4. "I've Got a Bet with Myself" (David Elliot)
5. "Money" (Janie Bradford, Berry Gordy)
6. "Get Out Your Big Roll Daddy" (Troy Seals, Roger Chapman)
7. "Willie and the Hand Jive" (Johnny Otis)
8. "The Got Song" (Tommy Talton)
9. "Give a Little Bit" (Talton)
10. "God Bless 'Em All" (Mickey Buckins)
11. "Summertime Blues" (Eddie Cochran) (2005 bonus track on European LP and US CD)

== Personnel ==
- Levon Helm – vocals, drums, percussion, mandolin
- Duncan Cameron, Pete Carr, Earl Cate, Jimmy Johnson, Wayne Perkins – guitar
- David Hood – bass guitar
- Barry Beckett, Ernest Cate, Steve Nathan – keyboards
- Mickey Buckins, Owen Hale, Roger Hawkins – drums, percussion
- Harvey Thompson, Robert Harwell – tenor saxophone
- Ronald Eades – baritone saxophone
- Ben Cauley, Harrison Calloway – trumpet
- Charles Rose – trombone
- Jimmy "Doc" Simpson – clarinet
- Ava Aldridge, Bonnie Bramlett, Lenny LeBlanc, Mac McAnally, Richard Supa, Robert Byrne, Ron Eoff, Russell Smith, Terry Cagle, Wayne Perkins, Will McFarlane – vocals
