= The Womack Family Band =

American family band

The Womacks
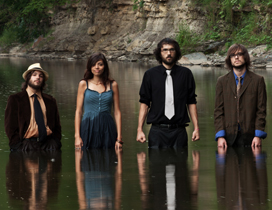
- The Womacks in 2010

Background information
- Origin: Norwalk, Ohio, United States
- Genres: Americana, folk rock
- Years active: 2008-2015, 2025-present
- Labels: Far Around Music, Untitled
- Members: Haley Heyman; Noah Heyman; Tony Schaffer; Cory Webb
- Past members: Kevin Obermeyer; Emily Keener; Seth Bain; Tommy Christian; Cory Boomer

The Womacks are an Americana music quartet from Norwalk, Ohio. The group consisted of Haley Heyman (guitar, mandolin, keyboards, vocals), Noah Heyman (guitar, mandolin, bass guitar, banjo, vocals), Tony Schaffer (piano, guitar, bass guitar, alto saxophone, trumpet, clarinet, vocals), and Cory Webb (drums). The band's unique and varied sound could be attributed to the group's three distinct songwriters, which allowed a new lyrical perspective with each song.

== Formation and band name ==
The members of The Womacks gradually came together around multi-instrumentalist Tony Schaffer, who had been performing with Americana Singer-Songwriter and fellow Ohioan Chris Castle. Schaffer and Noah Heyman started performing together as an acoustic duo in 2008, adding vocalist Haley Heyman to the line-up within six months. That same year, the trio became the featured weekly act at the Office Bar in Norwalk, Ohio, where they met bartender and drummer Cory Webb. Initially called "The Womack Brothers Family Band," the "Womack" of their name was meant to be a tongue-in-cheek nod to fans of singer-songwriter Tommy Womack and was initially coined by Schaffer and Castle as a bar-band alias. The name was changed to "The Womack Family Band" after Haley joined the group. The name, which was used as the title for the band's 2010 debut, would last until 2014, when they shortened the band name once again, this time to "The Womacks".

== Debut album ==
Folk Alley named The Womack Family Band their featured artists of July 2010. The group released their self-titled debut disc The Womack Family Band on September 15 of the same year, at the Winchester Music Hall (Lakewood, OH). The debut record consisted of 15 songs, written by Noah and Haley Heyman, and Tony Schaffer, the group's three primary songwriters, and included songs like "When The Winter Breaks", "Hold On", "Bloodline Blues", and "Sysiphus Stone".

== "From Chestnut" EP ==
The band's next release was an EP titled "From Chestnut". The entire disc was, like the debut, recorded entirely in the Womacks home studio on Chestnut Street. The collection was released in September 2011 and included songs like "Sara", "Sugar Honey", and "Nothing".

== The Blue Room ==
The Womacks' second full-length release as The Womack Family Band, The Blue Room, was also recorded at Chestnut and was released in 2012. They named the album after the common room they shared in their home. Songs include "Sun Shine Down My Way," "A Silver Line of Peace," and "For Lysie."

== "WFB," name change and "The Great American Treat" ==
The band's next release would mark a transition in their career. The quasi-self-titled "WFB" EP would be released under the new moniker of The Womacks. Recorded in their new base of operations, a ranch the band affectionately called "Higbee" in Monroeville, OH, the EP's release was celebrated with a large-scale all-day music festival at the ranch declared "The Great American Treat." The event, which included camping, food and art vendors, and a robust lineup of other local acts, was held Fourth of July weekend 2014.

== Collaboration with Emily Keener ==
Over the course of the following year, the Womacks would collaborate with fellow local musician Emily Keener. Keener, who had performed at the 2014 Great American Treat, recruited the band to support her 2015 release East of the Sun, which would ultimately be released as her second, and the Womacks third, album under "Emily Keener and the Womacks" in March 2015. Keener would become a contestant on the reality competition show The Voice the following year.

== The Second Annual Great American Treat and Break-Up ==
The band celebrated a second year of the Great American Treat festival in 2015, once again in July, but this time with a larger two-day event. The event, once again hosting a number of other bands and artists as well as the previous year's amenities, was again held at the Womack ranch. The band's live performance, which this time included Keener, would prove to be their last live performance. On August 25, 2015, the band shared on their public Facebook page that Haley Heyman had left the band for personal reasons, and thus, because "the Womacks without Haley is not the Womacks," the band would dissolve. They concurrently announced and released an EP called "Live Treats," initially to be released at the July event, which the band described as including "the 8-member incarnation" of the band, which included the band's original four members and Keener, as well as Seth Bain, Tommy Christian, and Cory Boomer.

== 2025 April Fools Day announcements and "Reunion" ==
The band's official Facebook page resumed activity, reposting old videos and performances, throughout 2024 and early 2025. On April 1, 2025, the page posted an announcement of a new album called Museum Glass, along with album art reminiscent of their self-titled debut album, with the caption "Long overdue. New album coming 2025." User comments noted the post's proximity to April 1, positing that the announcement could be an April Fools' Day joke. This announcement was followed on April 2 with another announcement, with the same caption, for an album called Fools Gold, indicating the previous was indeed a joke. Comments on both posts from members of the band indicated that either a non-member was running the Facebook page or that one of the members was operating the page and playing pranks on the band's followers.

On April 27, 2025, a video with the caption "It's time to move on" was posted. In the video, each of the four founding band members appear and say "there is no Womack reunion show happening," with each subsequent member gradually providing more specific information about when a reunion show "will not be happening" and how advance tickets "can not be purchased."

On May 21, 2025, the Womacks official page shared a post from member Tony Schaffer's personal page more explicitly and officially referencing a reunion and practice for the band. The following month, on June 2, the band made tickets available for the officially announced reunion show at the independent venue Bock's Jukejoint in Amherst, Ohio. Shortly thereafter, the band was also announced as part of the lineup for the annual New London, Ohio music and arts festival Jubileego, featuring numerous bands that had performed at the band's American Treat events.

On August 2, 2025, the band's reunion show, referred to as The Womack Family Reunion, took place. Singer-songwriter and Great American Treat performer Hebdo performed as opening act. The Womacks performed with their original lineup of Tony Schaffer, Cory Webb, Noah Heyman, and Haley Heyman, along with intermittent appearances from the band's former collaborator Emily Keener.
