= Honky Tonks and Cheap Motels =

Studio album by Whitey Morgan and the 78's
- Released: September 23, 2008
- Recorded: 2008
- Studio: Rustbelt Studios, Royal Oak, Michigan
- Genre: Outlaw country
- Label: Small Stone Records

Whitey Morgan and the 78's chronology
| Honky Tonks and Cheap Motels (2008) | Whitey Morgan and the 78's (2010) |

Professional ratings
Review scores
| Source | Rating |
|---|---|
| AllMusic | 3.5/5 stars |

Honky Tonks and Cheap Motels is the first studio album by Whitey Morgan and the 78's.

== Recording ==
The album was recorded at Rustbelt Studios, Royal Oak, Michigan and released on September 23, 2008, by Small Stone Recordings. The members of the band at the time of recording included Whitey Morgan (Eric David Allen) on vocals and guitar, Benny James Vermeylen on guitar and vocals, Jeremy "Leroy" Biltz on guitar, Jeremy Mackinder on bass, and Mike Popovich on drums. Special Guest musician Fred Newell (known for his many recordings with Waylon Jennings) on pedal steel.

== Album art ==
The album design, layout, and photography was completed by Liz "Cupcake Detroit" Mackinder.

== Track listing ==
1. "Hold Her When She Cries"
2. "Crazy"
3. "If It Ain't Broke" (Eric Allen, Dan Coburn)
4. "Back to Back" (Billy Dee, Wendall Atkins)
5. "Cheatin' Again"
6. "Honky Tonk Angel"
7. "I'm on Fire" (Bruce Springsteen)
8. "Another Round"
9. "Goodbye Dixie"
10. "Love and Honor"
11. "Prove It All to You"
12. "Sinner"
