= Larry Campbell (musician) =

American singer and multi-instrumentalist (born 1955)

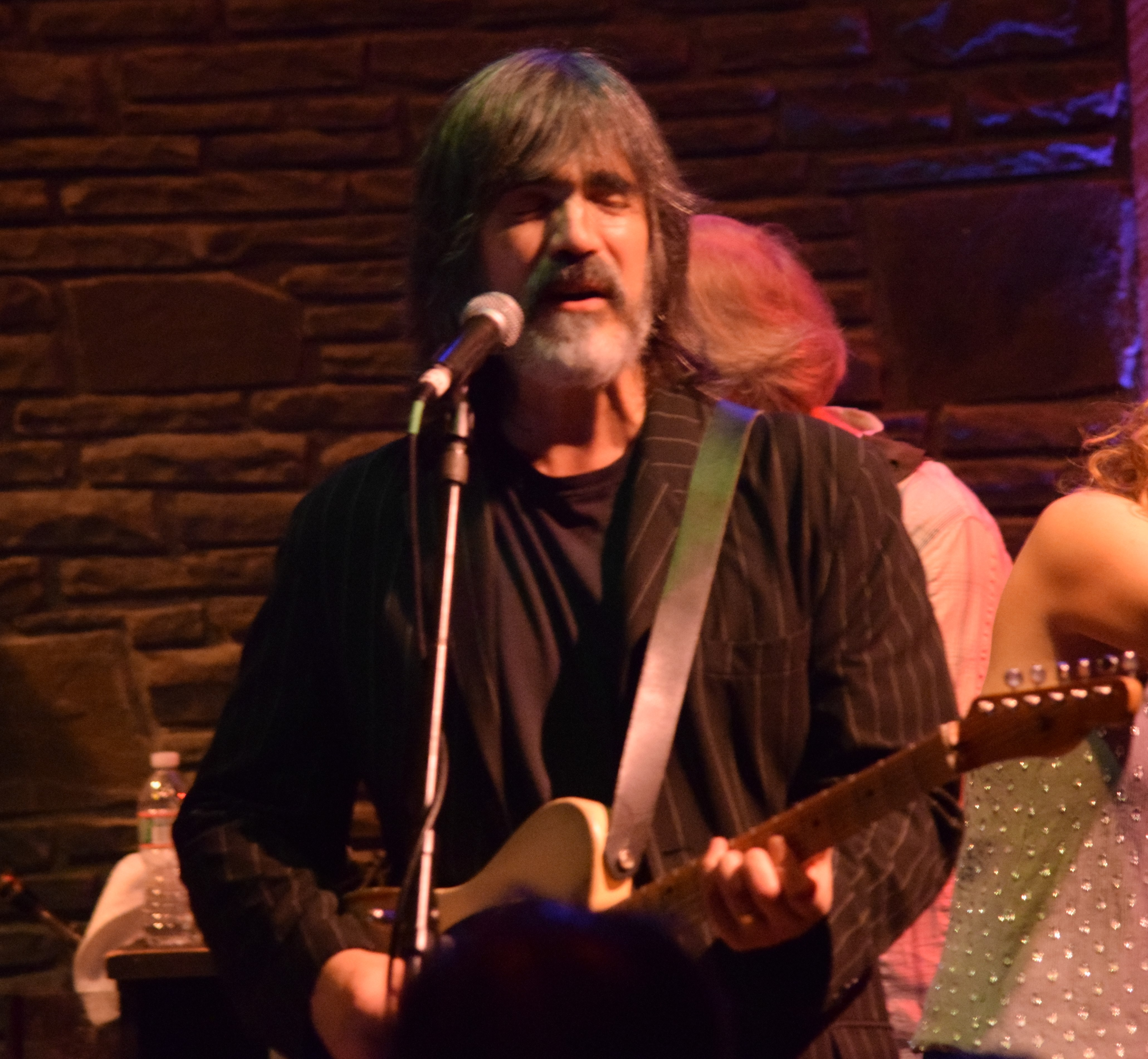

Background information
- Born: February 21, 1955 (age 71); New York City, U.S.
- Genres: Folk rock, blues, country
- Occupations: Musician, producer, composer
- Instruments: Guitar, vocals, violin, mandolin
- Years active: 1970s–present
- Spouse: Teresa Williams (m. 1988)
- Website: larrycampbellmusic.net

Larry Campbell (born February 21, 1955) is an American singer and multi-instrumentalist who plays many stringed instruments (including guitar, mandolin, pedal steel guitar, slide guitar, and violin) in genres including country, folk, blues, and rock. Campbell is best known for his time as part of Bob Dylan's Never Ending Tour band from 1997 to 2004, his association with Levon Helm of The Band, and the musical director of the Midnight Rambles.

Larry Campbell also has extensive experience as a studio musician. Over his 40-plus year career he has recorded with such artists as Levon Helm, Judy Collins, Lucy Kaplansky, Richard Shindell, Linda Thompson, Sheryl Crow, Chris Castle, Paul Simon, B. B. King, Willie Nelson, Eric Andersen, Buddy and Julie Miller, Kinky Friedman, Little Feat, Hot Tuna, Cyndi Lauper, k.d. lang, Anastasia Barzee, Rosanne Cash and Ayọ, among others.

== Biography ==
During the 1970s and 1980s, Campbell performed regularly on New York City's burgeoning country music scene, at well-known venues such as Greenwich Village's legendary Lone Star Cafe, City Limits, The Rodeo Bar, and O'Lunney's, near the United Nations. He contributed his talents to several musicals.

Beginning in the late 1970s, Campbell was also a member of The Woodstock Mountains Revue, a unique folk group that featured Artie & Happy Traum, Pat Alger, Jim Rooney, Bill Keith, John Herald, Eric Andersen and John Sebastian.

In 1982, Campbell performed in the orchestra for Alaska – The Musical, playing fiddle, acoustic and electric guitar, pedal steel and banjo. Campbell also performed in the orchestra for Big River in 1985, and Rhythm Ranch in 1989. In addition, he played pedal steel guitar, banjo, fiddle and guitar for the entire run of The Will Rogers Follies, which opened on Broadway on May 1, 1991.

Campbell was a member of Bob Dylan's "Never Ending Tour" band from March 31, 1997, until November 21, 2004. Through his association with Dylan's bass player Tony Garnier, Campbell joined the band, replacing John Jackson as a guitarist, and expanded the role to multi-instrumentalist, playing instruments such as cittern, violin/fiddle, pedal steel guitar, lap steel guitar, mandolin, banjo, and slide guitar.

Since Campbell's departure from Dylan's band, he has continued to make guest appearances with various artists and live acts including Peter Wolf, Elvis Costello, Emmylou Harris, Rosanne Cash, Furthur, and Phil and Friends. He has also produced albums for many artists, including Jorma Kaukonen.

Campbell toured regularly with Levon Helm, in addition to producing Helm's two Grammy-winning albums, Dirt Farmer and Electric Dirt, and acting as the musical director for Helm's Midnight Ramble concerts.

On September 18, 2008, at the 7th Annual Americana Music Association Honors and Awards Show, Campbell was presented with The Award for Lifetime Achievement for an Instrumentalist.

Campbell played banjo, fiddle, and pedal steel on The Black Crowes 2009 album Before the Frost...Until the Freeze. He also appears on the Outlaw Country band Whitey Morgan and the 78's recorded at Levon Helm's studio in December 2009 and January 2010, and Last Bird Home by Chris Castle, also recorded at Levon's studio in 2011.

Campbell played guitar, pedal steel, banjo, slide, mandolin, and fiddle on Dan Brenner's 2011 album Little Dark Angel produced by ten-time Grammy winner Jay Newland.

In 2012, Campbell won a Grammy award for the 2011 release Ramble at the Ryman.

Campbell and his wife, Teresa Williams, released a self-titled album on June 23, 2015, on Red House Records.

In 2019, Campbell and his wife filled in for Little Feat guitarist Paul Barrere during the band's 50th Anniversary Tour. The duo played with the band for most of the tour, from October 7–24, with Scott Sharrard taking over for the tour's last two dates on October 26 and 27, 2019. The duo's stint with Little Feat came shortly before Barrere's death on October 26, 2019.

== Personal life ==
Campbell is married to singer Teresa Williams. Williams and Campbell met in New York City while playing country music in the 1980s. They live in Woodstock, New York.

On March 24, 2020, Williams announced that Campbell had been diagnosed with COVID-19 amidst the COVID-19 pandemic. After a two-week illness, the couple released a performance of Rev. Gary Davis's "Let Us Get Together Right Down Here".

== Discography ==
Larry Campbell has contributed to many albums by various musical artists. This is a partial list.

- We Won't Dance – The Greg Trooper Band – 1986
- Picture Perfect Morning – Edie Brickell – 1994
- Cover Girl – Shawn Colvin – 1994
- Cry Cry Cry – Cry Cry Cry – 1998
- Love and Theft – Bob Dylan – 2001
- 23rd St. Lullaby – Patti Scialfa – 2004
- Rooftops – Larry Campbell – 2005
- Live at the Warfield – Phil Lesh and Friends – 2006
- Dirt Farmer – Levon Helm – 2007
- Abbey Sings Abbey – Abbey Lincoln – 2007
- River of Time – Jorma Kaukonen – 2009
- Electric Dirt – Levon Helm – 2009
- Before the Frost...Until the Freeze – The Black Crowes – 2009
- You Can Always Turn Around – Lucky Peterson – 2010
- Wood and Stone – Tara Nevins – 2010
- Whitey Morgan and the 78's – Whitey Morgan and the 78's – 2010
- Steady as She Goes – Hot Tuna – 2011
- Last Bird Home – Chris Castle – 2012
- Love for Levon: A Benefit to Save the Barn – various artists – 2013
- Only Slightly Mad – David Bromberg Band – 2013
- Ain't In No Hurry – Jorma Kaukonen – 2015
- Larry Campbell & Teresa Williams – Larry Campbell and Teresa Williams – 2015
- The Blues, the Whole Blues, and Nothing But the Blues – David Bromberg Band – 2016
- Contraband Love - Larry Campbell and Teresa Williams - 2017
- Resurrection - Kinky Friedman - 2019
- Travelin' Shoes - Marley's Ghost - 2019
- Big Road - David Bromberg - 2020
- I'll Meet You Here - Dar Williams - 2021
- Carry Me Home - Levon Helm / Mavis Staples - 2022
- Live at Levon's! - Larry Campbell and Teresa Williams - 2023
- Mixing Up the Medicine: A Retrospective - Bob Dylan - 2023
- More than a Whisper: Celebrating the Music of Nanci Griffith - Various Artists - 2023
- Queen of Me - Shania Twain - 2023
- The Bootleg Series, Vol. 17: Fragments - Time Out of Mind Sessions 1996-1997 - Bob Dylan - 2023
- To Lay Me Down - Dave McMurray - 2023
- Nebraska '82: Expanded Edition - Bruce Springsteen - Count Basie Theatre, Red Bank, NJ - 2025

Awards
| Preceded by Ry Cooder | AMA Lifetime Achievement Award for Instrumentalist; 2008 | Succeeded by Sam Bush |
