= Americana Music Association =

American non-profit organization

- Formation: 1999; 27 years ago
- Type: not-for-profit music organization
- Headquarters: Nashville, TN
- Official language: English
- Executive Director: Jed Hilly
- Website: americanamusic.org

The Americana Music Association is a not-for-profit trade organization advocating for American Roots Music globally, and supporting professionals within the field.

== Purpose ==
The Americana Music Association was founded in order to advocate and provide a network for Americana artists and industry professionals. The Association produces the annual Americana Music Festival and Conference, known as AMERICANAFEST, and the Americana Music Honors & Awards, typically held together in the fall. The association also manages and publishes radio airplay charts, publishes newsletters, conducts market research, and disseminates information about events in the Americana community.

== History ==
Founded in 1999, the association held its inaugural convention in September 2000 at the Hilton Suites in downtown Nashville, featuring performances by Sam Bush, Rhonda Vincent, Rodney Crowell, and Jim Lauderdale. The Americana Honors and Awards were added to the convention the following year. Americana icons Emmylou Harris, Billy Joe Shaver, and T-Bone Burnett were given lifetime achievement awards for performing, songwriting, and executive achievement, respectively. The 2001 convention also featured a surprise performance by Johnny Cash and June Carter Cash, with members of the Cash family. After being awarded the association's first "Spirit of Americana" Free Speech Award, Cash gave a recitation of his song-poem "Ragged Old Flag," before performing with June and their family. This was the last public performance the Cashes would ever give together.

Over time, the fall event attracted larger groups of fans and industry conferees, and the organization formally changed the name of its event to the Americana Music Festival and Conference. By 2008, the event had expanded to four days and moved its Awards Show to the historic Ryman Auditorium.

Previous musical performances at the conference have included Levon Helm's Ramble at the Ryman, John Fogerty, Grace Potter, The Avett Brothers, The Civil Wars, Bonnie Raitt, Booker T. Jones, Richard Thompson, Alabama Shakes, Punch Brothers, John Fullbright, and Robert Plant with Buddy Miller.

The Association's capstone event, the Americana Music Honors & Awards, aired live nationally on September 12, 2012, via AXS TV, broadcast via SiriusXM, WSM radio, and streamed by NPR.org. Musical segments of the awards show also appeared on PBS nationwide during the special presentation "ACL Presents: Americana Music Festival 2012". Additional international radio broadcasts via BBC2 and Voice of America began airing September 23, 2012.

== See also ==
- Americana Music Festival & Conference
- List of music organizations in the United States
