= Levon Helm (1978 album) =

Studio album by Levon Helm
- Released: 1978
- Studio: Cherokee, Hollywood, California; Muscle Shoals, Sheffield, Alabama
- Genre: Rock
- Label: ABC
- Producer: Donald "Duck" Dunn

Levon Helm chronology
Levon Helm & the RCO All-Stars (1977)	Levon Helm (1978)	American Son (1980)

Levon Helm is the second solo album by the American musician Levon Helm, released in 1978. Helm and collaborator Donald Dunn concentrated on singing and producing, respectively, rather than contributing on their main instruments of drums and bass. "I Came Here to Party" is a cover of the Tony Joe White song.

== Track listing ==
1. "Ain't No Way to Forget You" (Carroll Quillen, Grady Smith)
2. "Driving at Night" (Daniel Moore)
3. "Play Something Sweet" (Allen Toussaint)
4. "Sweet Johanna" (Johanna Hall, John Hall)
5. "I Came Here to Party" (Tony Joe White)
6. "Take Me to the River" (Al Green, Teenie Hodges)
7. "Standing on a Mountaintop" (Earl Cate, Ernie Cate)
8. "Let's Do It in Slow Motion" (Benny Latimore)
9. "Audience for My Pain" (Gerry Goffin, Barry Goldberg)

== Personnel ==
- Levon Helm – vocals
- Larry Byrom, Dan Ferguson, Jimmy Johnson – guitar
- Steve Cropper – guitar, percussion
- Scott Edwards, David Hood – bass guitar
- Barry Beckett, Randy McCormick – keyboards
- Willie Hall, Roger Hawkins – drums
- Lou Marini – tenor and alto saxophone
- Alan Rubin – trumpet
- Tom Malone – trombone, horn arrangements
- Earl Cate, Ernie Cate, Mary Berry – backing vocals
