= Dirt Farmer =

Studio album by Levon Helm
- Released: October 30, 2007
- Recorded: Levon Helm Studio, Woodstock, New York
- Genre: American folk
- Label: Vanguard
- Producer: Larry Campbell, Amy Helm

Levon Helm chronology
Levon Helm (1982)	Dirt Farmer (2007)	Electric Dirt (2009)

Professional ratings
Review scores
Source	Rating
Allmusic	3.5/5 stars
PopMatters	7/10
Rolling Stone	3.5/5 stars

Dirt Farmer is an album by American musician Levon Helm, former drummer and vocalist of The Band. The album was released on October 30, 2007, on Vanguard Records, and was Helm's first studio album since 1982. It was produced by guitarist Larry Campbell (who, like Helm, worked with Bob Dylan) and by Helm's daughter, Amy, both of whom also sing and perform on the album. It won the Grammy Award for Best Traditional Folk Album in February 2008.

== Track listing ==
1. "False Hearted Lover Blues" (Traditional) – 3:29
2. "Poor Old Dirt Farmer" (Tracy Schwarz) – 3:52
3. "The Mountain" (Steve Earle) – 3:35
4. "Little Birds" (Traditional) – 4:41
5. "The Girl I Left Behind" (Traditional) – 3:36
6. "Calvary" (Byron Isaacs) – 4:53
7. "Anna Lee" (Laurelyn Dossett) – 3:43
8. "Got Me a Woman" (Paul Kennerley) – 3:11
9. "A Train Robbery" (Paul Kennerley) – 5:28
10. "Single Girl, Married Girl" (A. P. Carter) – 3:18
11. "The Blind Child" (Traditional) – 3:26
12. "Feelin' Good" (J. B. Lenoir) – 3:31
13. "Wide River to Cross" (Buddy & Julie Miller) – 4:52

== Personnel ==
- Larry Campbell – dulcimer, acoustic guitar, fiddle, mandolin, percussion, arranger, background vocals, producer, guitar
- Georgette Cartwright – creative services coordinator
- Ahron R. Foster – photography
- Justin Guip – engineer, mixing
- Amy Helm – mandolin, percussion, piano, arranger, drums, vocals, background vocals, producer, harmony vocals, mandola
- Levon Helm – acoustic guitar, mandolin, arranger, drums, vocals, liner notes
- Byron Isaacs – bass, percussion, background vocals
- Buddy Miller – harmony vocals
- Julie Miller – harmony vocals
- Brian John Mitchell – piano, accordion, background vocals
- Glenn Patscha – pump organ
- George Receli – percussion
- Doug Sax – mastering
- Carrie Smith – art direction, design
- Teresa Williams – background vocals, harmony vocals
