= Levon Helm & the RCO All-Stars =

Levon Helm and the RCO All-Stars

Studio album by Levon Helm
- Released: November 19, 1977
- Studio: RCO (Woodstock, New York); Shangri-La (Malibu, California)
- Label: ABC
- Producer: Levon Helm, The RCO All-Stars

Levon Helm chronology
Levon Helm and the RCO All-Stars (1977)	Levon Helm (1978)

Professional ratings
Review scores
Source	Rating
Christgau's Record Guide	C+

Levon Helm and the RCO All-Stars is a 1977 album by the short-lived musical group of the same name. It was Levon Helm's first studio album independent of The Band. "RCO" is the name of the record studio cofounded by Helm where the album was recorded and derives from "ouR COmpany"

== Track listing ==
1. "Washer Woman" (Mac Rebennack)
2. "The Tie That Binds" (Mac Rebennack, Bobby Charles Guidry)
3. "You Got Me" (Booker T. Jones)
4. "Blues So Bad" (Henry Glover, Levon Helm)
5. "Sing, Sing, Sing (Let's Make a Better World)" (Earl King)
6. "Milk Cow Boogie" (Kokomo Arnold) (Traditional; arranged by Levon Helm and Donald Dunn)
7. "Rain Down Tears" (Henry Glover, Rudy Toombs)
8. "A Mood I Was In" (Fred Carter, Jr.)
9. "Havana Moon" (Chuck Berry)
10. "That's My Home" (Traditional; arranged by Levon Helm and Mac Rebennack)

== Chart performance ==
Chart (1977)	Peak position
Billboard 200	142

== Personnel ==
- Levon Helm – lead vocals, backing vocals, drums

The RCO All Stars

- Booker T. Jones – keyboards, percussion
- Mac Rebennack – keyboards, backing vocals, guitar, percussion
- Paul Butterfield – harmonica, backing vocals
- Fred Carter Jr., Steve Cropper – guitar
- Donald Dunn – bass guitar
- Howard Johnson – baritone saxophone, tuba
- Tom Malone – trombone
- Lou Marini – saxophone
- Alan Rubin – trumpet

Other musicians

- Emmaretta Marks – backing vocals
- Jeannette Baker – backing vocals
- John Flamingo – backing vocals
- Charles Miller – baritone saxophone (track 5)
- Jesse Ehrlich – strings (track 5)
- Louis Kievman – strings (track 5)
- Sid Sharp – strings (track 5)
- William Kurasch – strings (track 5)
- Robbie Robertson – guitar (track 5)
- Garth Hudson – accordion (track 5)

Technical

- Henry Glover – "Band Master"
- Recorded by Eddie Offord
