= Americana Music Festival & Conference =

- Location: Nashville, TN, USA
- Language: English
- Website: http://www.americanamusic.org

The Americana Music Festival & Conference is a music festival and music industry conference that takes place every year (usually in September). The first was held in 2000. It has since grown into a five-day multi-venue production. It is run by the Americana Music Association which is a professional not-for-profit trade organization whose mission is to promote awareness, provide a forum, and advocate for the creative and economic vitality of the Americana music genre.

== Overview ==
The Americana Music Festival & Conference is a five-day multi venue music festival and conference. All venues are located in or around downtown Nashville most within walking distance from the host hotel. In 2012, the event utilized nineteen different venues including The Ryman Auditorium, Hard Rock Cafe, and the SiriusXM theater at Bridgestone Arena. The host facility and hotel was the Sheraton Downtown Nashville Hotel.

The conference is held during the day. Registrants can attend informative panel sessions that feature prominent artists and music executives from the Americana genre, the exhibit hall, free luncheons (that also feature performances), evening parties held by various sponsors, networking events, book signings, movie screenings and the occasional surprise event. Each night, showcases are held simultaneously at six different venues that feature various Americana artists and bands. Fans are welcome to attend shows at one location or purchase a wristband to attend all four nights at any of the music venues. Shuttle buses are provided for conference registrants and wristband holders. The venues in 2012 were The Basement, The Rutledge, The Station Inn, Mercy Lounge, Cannery Ballroom and The High Watt.

The Americana Honors & Awards show is held during the week of the Americana Music Festival & Conference. It takes place at the historic Ryman Auditorium. Tickets are included with the conference registration until the award show sells out. The Americana Music Association urges people to sign up early so they will not miss out on the opportunity to attend.

Attendees have stated that the large event is a value. In 2012, rates varied from $350 (early bird rate) to $500 (standard rate) for non-members. Members of the association received a $100 discount.

== History ==
2000

November 10–11

The very first Americana Music Convention (its name was later changed to Americana Music Festival & Conference) was held at the Hilton Hotel in Nashville, TN. The two-day event featured artists such as Sam Bush, Porter Wagoner and Rodney Crowell. Approximately 350 registrants attended.

2001

November 1–3

Originally slated for September 14–16, the Americana Music Association decided to postpone the event after the September 11th attacks. Once reschedule, it was a success. The event expanded to three days and began with a Kickoff Party featuring Gillian Welch, Chip Taylor and Paul Thorn. The Keynote address was given by Rodney Crowell.

2002

September 12–14

"This Week in Americana", a nationally syndicated radio show, was taped at the conference and featured Kelly Willis. Pam Tillis was featured in a panel called "Deeper Roots: Americana Reissues, Classics and Legends".

2003

September 18–20

The Americana Music Conference moved to the Renaissance Hotel and presented its first trade show/exhibit hall. The Keynote was given by Ken Kragen, a notable manager for artists such as the Bee Gees, Kenny Rogers, Dottie West and many others. Rodney Crowell gave a special performance and interview. "This Week in Americana", a nationally syndicated radio show, was taped at the conference and featured Jessi Colter. A songwriter workshop was conducted by Jim Lauderdale, Darrell Scott and Chip Taylor.

2004

September 23–25

The event moved to the Nashville Convention Center. A songwriter's workshop was moderated by Frank Liddell and featured Bruce Robison, Radney Foster and Cowboy Jack Clement. The Avett Brothers played their first Americana Music Festival & Conference nightly showcase.

2005

September 8–10

Ashley Capps of Bonnaroo was the keynote address. The Kickoff Party featured the Avett Brothers followed by Elizabeth Cook, Bobby Bare, Marty Stuart, Solomon Burke and The Knitters.

2006

September 20–22

2007

October 31 - November 3

The event expanded to four days and featured two Keynote Interviews. One with Lyle Lovett and the other with Emmylou Harris. The first annual AMERICANARAMA was held at Grimey's New & Preloved Music.

2008

September 17–20

2008 was a big year for the Americana Music Festival & Conference with approximately 1000 registrants to the conference and 12,000 visitors to the nightly showcases. There were many noteworthy happenings. T-Bone Burnett made an unannounced keynote interview. The event produced Levon Helm's Ramble at the Ryman. There was a songwriter's round hosted by Jim Lauderdale with Robert Earl Keen and Grace Potter. A noteworthy panel was "Lonestar Legacy: Role of Texas in helping shape Americana Music" moderated by Tamara Saviano featuring recording artists Cody Canada of Cross Canadian Ragweed, Rosie Flores, Radney Foster and Bruce Robison. Each artist was also featured in the nightly showcases. Additionally, the Americana Music Festival & Conference teamed up with the Country Music Hall of Fame and Museum to present a screening of "Meet Glen Campbell: A documentary" with a discussion with Glen Campbell following. The biggest unexpected event of all was a performance by John Fogerty at the Mercy Lounge.

2009

September 10–19

The keynote interview of the year was with Rosanne Cash. An Intensive Songwriting event was held featuring Mary Gauthier and Darrell Scott.

2010

September 8–11

The event moved to the Sheraton Nashville Downtown Hotel. The keynote interview featured Mary Chapin Carpenter. Wanda Jackson participated in an interview and signing.

2011

October 12–15

The Civil Wars with acclaimed producer, Charlie Peacock, impressed the full house in the annual Keynote Interview. Steve Forbert gave an acoustic performance and displayed his photographs at the Tinney Contemporary Gallery.

2012

September 12–16

The event expanded to five days and utilized over 19 venues. It was the largest and most highly attended Americana Music Festival & Conference to date. Bonnie Raitt packed the Listening Lounge during her Keynote Interview with Ann Powers of NPR Music. A panel session, aptly named Charting New Waters, showcased presented innovative artists discussing how they navigate through the music industry. It included Robert Ellis, Charlie Faye, John Fullbright, Lera Lynn, Paul Thorn and Anthony da Costa. Wanda Jackson gave a surprise performance in the downstairs lobby of the Sheraton Downtown Nashville Hotel. Booker T. Jones was interviewed at the Country Music Hall of Fame and Museum. There was an author signing with Kinky Friedman, author of The Billy Bob Tapes: A Cave Full of Ghosts. More artists participated in panel sessions throughout the conference than ever before including Allison Moorer, Matraca Berg, Matthew Perryman Jones, Guy Clark, Rodney Crowell, Craig Krampf, Rose Cousins, Jody Stephens, Scott Bomar, Kelly Willis, Amy Black, Mark O'Shea, Victoria Shaw, Rod Picott, Susan Catteneo, Peter Cooper, Otis Gibbs, Oliver Wood and Sarah Jarosz.

2013

September 18–22

The event was again hosted at the Sheraton Nashville Downtown Hotel and utilized many venues in the downtown Nashville area.

2014

September 17–21

The host hotel was moved to the Hutton Hotel, 1808 West End Avenue. The Avett Brothers headlined a new outdoor Riverfront show. Special events included several interviews located at the Country Music Hall of Fame and Museum: Marty Stuart, Ry Cooder. There was also a performance at that venue by BR5-49, Paul Burch, Greg Garing, R.B. Morris, which celebrated the 20th anniversary of the Nashville "Lower Broadway Renaissance"

2015

September 15–20

Hutton Hotel, 1808 West End Evenue
