= This Wheel's on Fire: Levon Helm and the Story of the Band =

1993 book by Levon Helm

- First edition cover
- Author: Levon Helm with Stephen Davis
- Language: English
- Subject: Autobiography
- Publisher: William Morrow
- Publication date: 1993
- Publication place: United States
- Media type: Print
- Pages: 320
- ISBN: 0688-10906-3
- LC Class: ML419.H42A3 1993

This Wheel's on Fire: Levon Helm and the Story of the Band is the 1993 autobiography of actor and musician Levon Helm, focusing on his career as a member of the rock group the Band. The book, written with music journalist Stephen Davis, traces Helm's life from his childhood in the deep south through his years as a drummer and singer for the Band, to his struggle to establish a professional identity in the wake of the group's official end in 1976.

The book is notable for providing readers with an inside look at the evolution of a rock and roll group, as well as for placing the blame for the Band's break-up on the shoulders of guitarist Robbie Robertson. Among the accusations Helm makes against Robertson is conspiring with record companies to steal song-writing credits from other members of the Band, arranging the group's break-up as a part of a private agenda, and conspiring with The Last Waltz director Martin Scorsese (a personal friend of Robertson) to make Robertson appear to be the leader and most important member of the group.

Helm's bitterness toward Robertson is balanced by his effusive praise of other musicians, especially other members of the Band, even pausing to admire Robertson's stage presence and talent as a guitarist.
