= Turkey Scratch, Arkansas =

Turkey Scratch
- Unincorporated community
- Location within the state of Arkansas
- Coordinates: 34°38′38″N 90°55′38″W
- Country: United States
- State: Arkansas
- County: Phillips
- Elevation: 184 ft (56 m)
- Time zone: UTC-6 (CST)
  - Summer (DST): UTC-5 (CDT)
- GNIS feature ID: 55730

Turkey Scratch is an unincorporated community within Phillips County, Arkansas, United States.

== Notable people ==
- Levon Helm, rock multi-instrumentalist and singer (The Band)
- Robert Lockwood Jr., blues musician
