= Whitey Morgan and the 78's =

American country band

- Whitey Morgan in Woodstock, New York in 2009

Background information
- Origin: Flint, Michigan, U.S.
- Genres: Outlaw country; alternative country; country
- Years active: 2005–present
- Labels: Small Stone, Bloodshot, Whitey Morgan Music
- Members: Eric Allen (aka Whitey Morgan); Johnny Up; Joey Spina; Alex Lyon; Danny Raincheck; Eric Savage; Jack Quiggins
- Past members: Benny James Vermeylen; Jeremy Biltz; Tamineh Gueramy; Jeremy Mackinder; Mike Popovich; Dan Coburn; Brett Martin; Chris Hornus; Charlie Klein; Brett Robinson; Tony Martinez; Tony DiCello
- Website: whiteymorgan.com

Whitey Morgan and the 78's are an American country band based in Flint, Michigan. In 2010, they signed a recording contract with Chicago-based Bloodshot Records.

== Origins ==
Started in 2005, under the name Whitey Morgan and the Waycross Georgia Farmboys, the original members included Whitey Morgan (a.k.a. Eric Allen) on vocals and guitar, Jeremy Mackinder on bass, and Dylan Dunbar and Jack Schneider on guitar and drums, respectively. After establishing themselves in the Midwest Honky Tonk scene, the band recorded a self-produced EP which includes early versions of "Goodbye Dixie", "Prove It All To You", and "If It Ain't Broke". The band soon signed a deal with Detroit's own Small Stone Recordings and went back into the studio to record a cover version of Van Halen's "Runnin' with the Devil" for the label's compilation album, Sucking the 70's.

== History ==
=== 2007–2008: Honky Tonks and Cheap Motels ===
In 2007, the band changed its line-up to Whitey Morgan on vocals and guitar, Benny James Vermeylen (formerly of 3 Speed and South Normal) on guitar and vocals, Jeremy "Leroy" Biltz on guitar, Jeremy Mackinder on bass, and Mike Popovich (formerly of The Holy Cows 3 Speed, and The OffRamps) on drums, and officially became Whitey Morgan and the 78's. In 2008 the band released its debut album Honky Tonks and Cheap Motels on Small Stone Recordings.

=== 2009–present: Whitey Morgan and the 78's ===
In 2009, the band saw the addition of Tamineh Gueramy on fiddle. The band then headed to Woodstock, New York in the fall of 2009 to begin recording the follow-up to Honky Tonks... at the Levon Helm Studios. With almost 200 shows a year and the new album nearing completion, the band drew the attention of Chicago's Bloodshot Records and signed a new record contract. Their self-titled album was released on October 12, 2010. Ahead of the record's release, both Benny James and Mike Popovich left the band, replaced by Travis Harrett on the drums and Brett Robinson joined on pedal steel guitar. In April 2012, Jeremy Mackinder was replaced by Joey Spina on guitar. The album Grandpa's Guitar was released in December 2014. It features three cover tunes: Bruce Springsteen's "Highway Patrolman," "Today I Started Loving You Again" by Merle Haggard and Bonnie Owens, and "Dead Flowers" by The Rolling Stones.

== Personnel ==
As of August 2018, the line-up features Whitey Morgan on guitar/vocals, Johnny Up on pedal steel guitar, Joey Spina on guitar, Alex Lyon on Bass, Jack Quiggins on acoustic guitar and Eric Savage on drums.

== National recognition ==
After touring with fellow Michigan band The Deadstring Brothers and Wayne "the Train" Hancock, both Bloodshot Records recording artists, Whitey Morgan and the 78's were signed to Bloodshot in 2010. On October 16, 2010, the band performed on NPR's Mountain Stage. They played a four-song, fifteen-minute set. The episode also featured Scott Miller, Gene Watson and The Steel Drivers.

== Discography ==
Title	Album details	Peak chart positions			Sales
Title	Album details	US Country	US Heat	US Indie	Sales
Honky Tonks and Cheap Motels	Release date: September 23, 2008; Label: Small Stone Records	—	—	—	
Whitey Morgan and the 78's	Release date: October 12, 2010; Label: Bloodshot Records	64	48	—	
Sonic Ranch	Release date: May 19, 2015; Label: Whitey Morgan Music	30	10	29	US: 4,700
Hard Times and White Lines	Release date: October 26, 2018; Label: Whitey Morgan Music	19	2	5	US: 6,000
"—" denotes releases that did not chart

=== Music videos ===
Year	Video
2015	"Waitin' 'Round To Die"

== Awards ==
- 2009: 3 Detroit Music Awards: Best Country Vocal Performance, Best Country Songwriter, Best Country Album (following the release of their first studio album)
- 2010: Best Country Recording (following the release of Whitey Morgan and the 78's)
- 2014: Winner of The Ameripolitan Music Awards Outlaw Country Band of the Year
