= Brian Mitchell (musician) =

American musical artist

- Origin: New York, U.S
- Occupation: Musician
- Instruments: Piano, Hammond B-3 organ, accordion, various vintage keyboards and harmonica
- Website: Official website

Brian Mitchell is a musical artist who records and performs his own original music. He has also worked with artists such as Levon Helm & The Midnight Ramble Band, Bob Dylan, BB King, Al Green, Dolly Parton, Buster Poindexter, and Allen Toussaint. Mitchell has appeared on five Grammy Award-winning recordings, three with Levon Helm, and one each with BB King and with Les Paul. In 2015, Brian was inducted into the New York Blues Hall of Fame. He is known to have versatility on piano, Hammond B-3 organ, accordion, various vintage keyboards and harmonica, plus his distinct vocal stylings. Mitchell believed that music is life music can heal people

Mitchell is a native New Yorker and is a part of Manhattan's competitive live music scene. Known for kicking out high-energy performances, Mitchell's music “features a blend of gutbucket blues, funky New Orleans style R&B, quirky Latin rhythms, and occasional visits into outer space.”

Mitchell is currently performing throughout the country with The Weight, former members of The Band & The Levon Helm Midnight Ramble celebrating the music of The Band. He performs much of his original music with "The Brian Mitchell Band" as well as with his accordion power trio "Fatboy Kanootch" with Clark Gayton on tuba. He also performs funky electronica music with "House of Diablo" featuring Shawn Pelton on drums and electronic percussion at various nightclubs and performance spaces around New York City.

Mitchell's work as a composer has been featured in TV, film, and theatre. His original music with House of Diablo was featured in the Robert Altman movie Tanner On Tanner. His blues piano stylings were used in Bill Sims music for August Wilson's Broadway play "8 Pianos". He also cowrote the music for the AMC TV series Hell On Wheels with Marc Copely and James Dolan and recently, the song "Step Away" written by Mitchell and Christine Santelli was included on Bettye LaVette's Grammy nominated CD "Worthy".

Mitchell has made frequent TV appearances including performances on The Late Show with David Letterman, Late Night with Conan O’Brien, and The Tonight Show appearing with artists such as Dolly Parton, Dwight Yoakam, and Rosanne Cash. He has made an appearance on the soap opera "One Life To Live" as a mysterious piano man in the local hotel bar. Mitchell's accordion can be heard throughout Bob Dylan's version of the Dean Martin chestnut “Return To Me" on the HBO series The Sopranos. Other special collaborations include accompanying actor Christopher Walken on accordion in the movie "Search and Destroy" and playing piano with Amy Helm in the Vera Farmiga directed film "Higher Ground".

Mitchell performed with Levon Helm in the Grammy award-winning DVD Live At The Ryman along with Robert Plant, Steve Earle, Emmylou Harris, Buddy Miller, and Sheryl Crow. On the PBS show The Love For Levon Concert, he can be seen performing with Roger Waters, Gregg Allman & Warren Haynes, John Mayer, John Hiatt, John Prine, Mavis Staples, Lucinda Williams, Jakob Dylan, Dierks Bentley, Eric Church, and My Morning Jacket. On April 22, 2017, Mitchell performed on PBS once again with The Weight Band on "Live At The Infinity" and in November 2017, he appeared at The Woodland Festival in Namsos, Norway as the featured accordionist. In December 2017, he appeared at the 37th annual John Lennon Tribute at The Symphony Space performing the music of the Beatles' Sgt. Pepper's Lonely Hearts Club Band with Fatboy Kanootch.

His unique approach to performing and recording in the studio was the subject of a feature article in Keyboard Magazine. Subsequently, Brian has written various articles about his approach to performance as well as doing an interview with Allen Toussaint.

In 2018, Mitchell released the album World Gone Mad as a member of The Weight Band. The project features contributions from Levon Helm, Jackie Greene and Stan Szelest.
