= Levon Helm =

American drummer and vocalist (1940–2012)

- Helm in 1969
- Born: Mark Lavon Helm; May 26, 1940; Elaine, Arkansas, U.S.
- Died: April 19, 2012 (aged 71); New York City, U.S.
- Resting place: Woodstock Cemetery
- Occupations: Musician; songwriter; singer; record producer
- Years active: 1957–2012
- Spouse: Connie Orr (m. 1962, divorced) Sandra Dodd (m. 1981)
- Partner: Libby Titus (1969–1978)
- Children: Amy Helm
- Musical career
- Genres: Rock; Americana; country; folk; roots rock
- Instruments: Drums; vocals; mandolin; guitar; bass; harmonica
- Labels: Capitol; MCA
- Formerly of: The Band; Ringo Starr & His All-Starr Band
- Website: levonhelm.com

Mark Lavon "Levon" Helm (May 26, 1940 – April 19, 2012) was an American musician and actor who achieved fame as the drummer and one of the three lead vocalists for The Band, for which he was inducted into the Rock and Roll Hall of Fame in 1994. Helm was known for his deeply soulful, country-accented voice, multi-instrumental ability, and creative drumming style, highlighted on many of the Band's recordings, such as "The Weight", "Up on Cripple Creek", and "The Night They Drove Old Dixie Down".

Helm also had a successful career as a film actor, appearing as Loretta Lynn's father in Coal Miner's Daughter (1980), as Chuck Yeager's friend and colleague Captain Jack Ridley in The Right Stuff (1983), the father of Laura Dern's character in Smooth Talk (1985), as a Tennessee firearms expert in Shooter (2007), and as General John Bell Hood in In the Electric Mist (2009).

In 1998, Helm was diagnosed with throat cancer, which caused him to lose his singing voice. After treatment, his cancer eventually went into remission, and he gradually regained the use of his voice. His 2007 comeback album Dirt Farmer earned the Grammy Award for Best Traditional Folk Album in February 2008, and in November of that year, Rolling Stone magazine ranked him No. 91 on its list of 100 Greatest Singers of All Time. In 2010, Electric Dirt, his 2009 follow-up to Dirt Farmer, won the first Grammy Award for Best Americana Album, a category inaugurated in 2010. In 2011, his live album Ramble at the Ryman won the Grammy in the same category. In 2016, Rolling Stone ranked him No. 22 on its list of 100 Greatest Drummers of All Time.

== Biography ==
=== Early years ===
Born Mark Lavon Helm in Elaine, Arkansas, his father's earliest American ancestor was English colonist Robert Glidewell, born 1 February 1701 at Bristol, Prince George, Virginia, USA. Robert Glidewell was the father of Nash Glidewell who served in the 10th and 14th Virginia Continental army. Nash was present at Valley Forge under Captain John Tweatt.

Helm grew up in Turkey Scratch, a hamlet of Marvell, Arkansas. His parents, Emma “Nell” and Jasper “Diamond” Helm, were cotton farmers who shared a strong affinity for music. They encouraged their children to play and sing at a young age. Helm saw Bill Monroe and His Blue Grass Boys when he was 6, and he decided to become a musician. Helm began playing the guitar at age 8 and also played drums.

Arkansas in the 1940s and '50s stood at the confluence of a variety of musical styles, including traditional Delta blues, electric blues, country (including old-time music), and the incipient genre of rhythm and blues (R&B). Helm was influenced by each of these styles, which he heard on the Grand Ole Opry on radio station WSM and R&B on radio station WLAC in Nashville. He also saw the last vestiges of minstrelsy and other traveling variety shows, such as F. S. Wolcott's Original Rabbit's Foot Minstrels, which featured top Black artists of the era.

A key early influence on Helm was Sonny Boy Williamson II, who played electric blues and early R&B on the King Biscuit Time radio show on KFFA in Helena and performed regularly in Marvell with blues guitarist Robert Lockwood, Jr. In his 1993 autobiography, This Wheel's on Fire: Levon Helm and the Story of the Band, Helm describes watching Williamson's drummer, James "Peck" Curtis, intently during a live performance in the early 1950s and later imitating this R&B drumming style. Helm established his first band, the Jungle Bush Beaters, while in high school.

Helm also witnessed some of the earliest performances by early rock and roll and rockabilly artists, including Elvis Presley, Conway Twitty, Bo Diddley, and fellow Arkansas native Ronnie Hawkins. At age 17, Helm began playing in clubs and bars around Helena.

=== The Hawks ===
While he was still in high school, Helm was invited to join Ronnie Hawkins' band, the Hawks, a popular bar and club act in the South and Canada, where rockabilly acts were very successful. Helm's mother insisted that he graduate from high school before touring with Hawkins, but he was able to play with the Hawks locally on weekends. After his graduation in 1958, Helm joined the Hawks as a full-time member; they moved to Toronto, where they signed with Roulette Records in 1959 and released several singles, including a few hits.

Helm reports in his autobiography that fellow Hawks band members had difficulty pronouncing "Lavon" correctly and started calling him "Levon" (/ˈliːvɒn/ LEE-von) because it was easier to pronounce.

In 1961, Helm with bassist Rick Danko backed jazz guitarist Lenny Breau on several tracks recorded at Hallmark Studios in Toronto. These tracks are included on the 2003 release The Hallmark Sessions.

By the early 1960s, Helm and Hawkins had recruited an all-Canadian lineup of musicians: guitarist Robbie Robertson, bassist Rick Danko, pianist Richard Manuel, and organist Garth Hudson, all of whom were multi-instrumentalists. In 1963, the band parted ways with Hawkins and started touring as Levon and the Hawks and later as the Canadian Squires, before changing back to the Hawks. They recorded two singles but remained mostly a popular touring bar band in Texas, Arkansas, Canada, and on the East Coast of the United States, where they found regular summer club gigs on the New Jersey shore.

By the mid-1960s, songwriter and musician Bob Dylan was interested in performing electric rock music and asked the Hawks to be his backing band. Disheartened by fans' negative response to Dylan's new sound, Helm left the group in the autumn of 1965 for what turned out to be a two-year layoff, being replaced by a range of touring drummers (most notably Mickey Jones) and Manuel, who began to double on the instrument. He spent time with his family in Arkansas, but also undertook sojourns to Los Angeles, where he experimented with LSD and performed with Bobby Keys, and to Memphis and New Orleans, where he worked on a nearby oil platform. In the autumn of 1967, after what would later be called "the Summer of Love", he returned to the group.

After the Hawks toured Europe with Dylan, they followed him back to the U.S., remaining under salary, and settled near Dylan's home in Woodstock, New York. The Hawks recorded a large number of demonstration and practice tapes in nearby West Saugerties, New York, playing almost daily with Dylan, who had completely withdrawn from public life following a motorcycle accident in July 1966. These recordings were widely bootlegged and were partially released officially in 1975 as The Basement Tapes. The songs and themes developed during this period played a crucial role in the group's future direction and style. The Hawks also began writing their own songs, with Danko and Manuel also sharing writing credits with Dylan on a few songs.

=== The Band ===
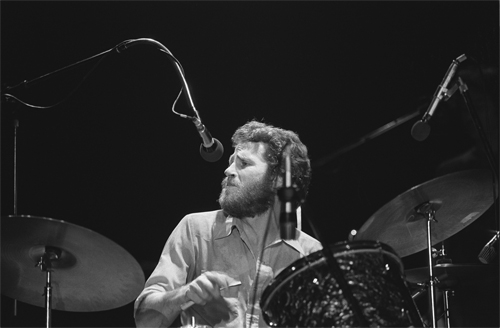
Helm with the Band at the Santa Cruz Civic Auditorium, 1976 (photo: David Gans)

Helm returned to the group, then referred to simply as "the band”, as it was known around Woodstock. While contemplating a recording contract, Helm had dubbed the band "The Crackers”, but when Robertson and their new manager Albert Grossman worked out the contracts, the group's name was given as "the Band”. Under these contracts, the Band was contracted to Grossman, who in turn contracted their services to Capitol Records. This arrangement allowed the Band to release recordings on other labels if the work was done in support of Dylan. Thus the Band was able to play on Dylan's Planet Waves album and to release The Last Waltz, both on other labels. The Band also recorded their own album, Music from Big Pink (1968), which catapulted them into stardom. Helm was the Band's only American member.

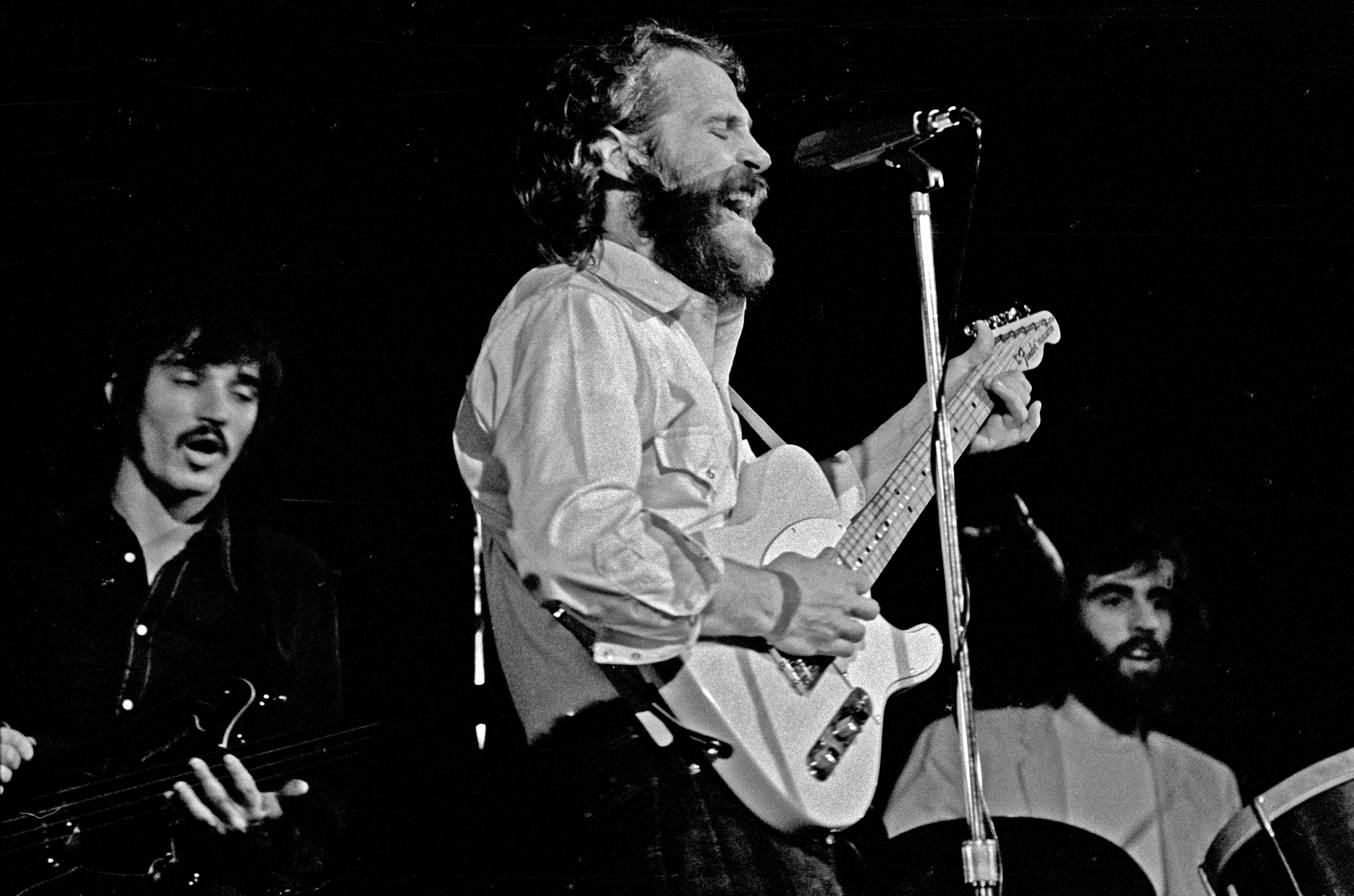
Helm, center, performing with the Band, Hamburg, 1971

On Music from Big Pink, Manuel was the most prominent vocalist, and Helm sang backup and harmony, with the exception of "The Weight". However, as Manuel's health deteriorated and Robbie Robertson's songwriting increasingly looked to the South for influence and direction, subsequent albums relied more and more on Helm's vocals, alone or in harmony with Danko. Helm was primarily a drummer and vocalist and increasingly sang lead, although, like all his bandmates, he was also a multi-instrumentalist. On occasion, Manuel switched to drums while Helm played mandolin, guitar, or bass guitar (while Danko played fiddle) on some songs. Helm played the 12-string guitar backdrop to "Daniel and the Sacred Harp".

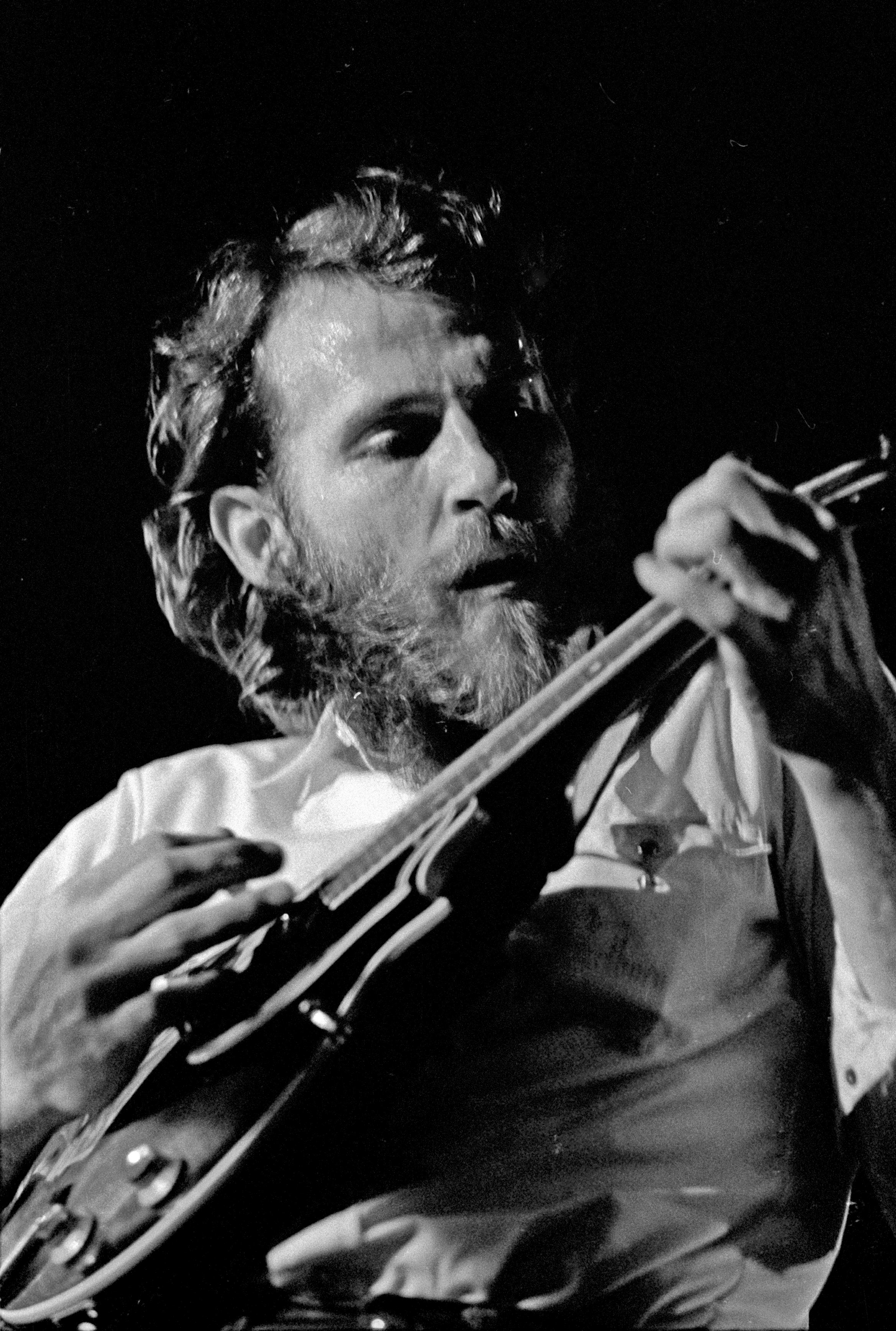
Helm playing the mandolin in 1971

Helm remained with the Band until their farewell performance on Thanksgiving Day, November 25, 1976, which was the subject of the documentary film The Last Waltz, directed by Martin Scorsese. Helm repudiated his involvement with The Last Waltz shortly after the completion of its final scenes. In his autobiography, Helm criticized the film and Robertson who produced it.

=== Solo, acting and the reformed Band ===
With the breakup of the Band in its original form, Helm began working on a solo-ensemble album, Levon Helm & the RCO All-Stars, with Paul Butterfield, Fred Carter, Jr., Emmeretta Marks, Howard Johnson, Steve Cropper, Donald "Duck" Dunn, Booker T. Jones, and others. Levon Helm and the RCO All-Stars recorded Live at The Palladium NYC, New Year's Eve 1977. The CD album released in March 2006 features over one hour of blues-rock music performed by an ensemble featuring Levon Helm (drums/vocals), Dr. John (keys/vocals), Paul Butterfield (harmonica/vocals), Fred Carter (guitar/vocals), Donald "Duck" Dunn (bass), Cropper (guitar), Lou Marini (saxophones), Howard Johnson (tuba/baritone sax), Tom "Bones" Malone (trombone), and Alan Rubin (trumpet).

This was followed in 1978 by the solo album Levon Helm. More solo albums were released in 1980 and 1982: American Son and (once again) Levon Helm, both produced by Fred Carter, Jr. He also participated in musician Paul Kennerley's 1980 country music concept album, The Legend of Jesse James, singing the role of Jesse James alongside Johnny Cash, Emmylou Harris, Charlie Daniels, Albert Lee, and others.

In addition to his work as musician, Helm also acted in several dramatic films. He was cast as Loretta Lynn's father in the 1980 film Coal Miner's Daughter, followed three years later by a role as U.S. Air Force test pilot and engineer Capt. Jack Ridley, in The Right Stuff. Helm was also the latter film's narrator. The 1987 under-appreciated End of the Line featured Levon as a small-town railroad employee alongside Wilford Brimley and Kevin Bacon. He played a Kentucky backwoods preacher in Fire Down Below. He played an eccentric old man in the 2005 film The Three Burials of Melquiades Estrada and appeared as Gen. John Bell Hood in the 2009 film In the Electric Mist. He also had a brief cameo as a weapons expert in the film Shooter with Mark Wahlberg.

In 1983, the Band reunited without Robbie Robertson, at first playing with an expanded lineup that included the entire Cate Brothers Band, but in 1985, paring down and adding Jim Weider on guitar. In 1986, while on tour, Manuel committed suicide. Helm, Danko, and Hudson continued in the Band, adding pianist Richard Bell and drummer/vocalist Randy Ciarlante and releasing the album Jericho in 1993 and High on the Hog in 1996. The final album from the Band was the 30th-anniversary album, Jubilation released in 1998.

In 1989, Helm and Danko toured with drummer Ringo Starr as part of his All-Starr Band. Other musicians in the band included singer and guitarist Joe Walsh, singer and pianist Dr. John, singer and guitarist Nils Lofgren, singer Billy Preston, saxophonist Clarence Clemons, and drummer Jim Keltner. Garth Hudson was a guest on accordion on some dates. Helm played drums and harmonica and sang "The Weight" and "Up on Cripple Creek" each night.

In the televised 1989 Juno Awards celebration, the Band was inducted into the Juno Awards' Hall of Fame. Helm was not present at the ceremony, but a taped segment of him offering his thanks was broadcast after the acceptance speeches by Rick Danko and Robbie Robertson. Richard Manuel's children accepted the award on behalf of their father. To conclude the televised special, Rick Danko, Garth Hudson, and Robbie Robertson performed "The Weight" with Blue Rodeo.

Helm performed with Danko and Hudson as the Band in 1990 at Roger Waters's epic The Wall – Live in Berlin Concert in Germany to an estimated 300,000 to half a million people.

In 1993, Helm published an autobiography titled This Wheel's on Fire: Levon Helm and the Story of the Band.

=== The Midnight Ramble ===
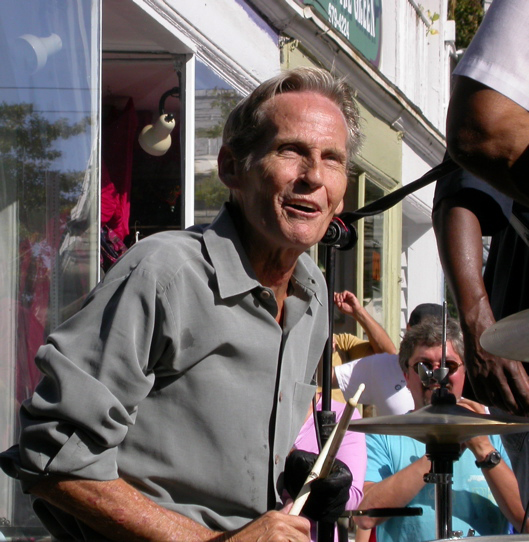
Helm performing in 2004

Helm's vocal cords were damaged due to a bout with throat cancer in the 1990s, and his clear, powerful tenor voice was replaced by a quiet rasp.

Helm's performance career in the 2000s revolved mainly around the Midnight Ramble at his home and studio, "The Barn", in Woodstock, New York. These concerts, featuring Helm and various musical guests, allowed him to raise money for his medical bills and to resume performing after a bout with cancer that nearly ended his career. Initially, Helm only played drums and relied on guest vocalists at the Rambles, but eventually his singing voice grew stronger. On January 10, 2004, he sang again at his Ramble sessions. In 2007, during production of Dirt Farmer, Helm estimated that his singing voice was 80% recovered.

The Levon Helm Band featured his daughter Amy Helm, Larry Campbell, Teresa Williams, Jim Weider (The Band's last guitarist), Jimmy Vivino, Mike Merritt, Brian Mitchell, Erik Lawrence, Steven Bernstein, Howard Johnson (tuba player in the horn section on the Band's Rock of Ages and The Last Waltz), Clark Gayton, Jay Collins (Helm's now former son-in-law), Byron Isaacs, and blues harmonica player Little Sammy Davis.

The Midnight Ramble was an outgrowth of an idea Helm explained to Martin Scorsese in The Last Waltz. Earlier in the 20th century, Helm recounted, traveling medicine shows and music shows such as F. S. Wolcott's Original Rabbit's Foot Minstrels, featuring African-American blues singers and dancers, would put on titillating performances in rural areas. (This was also turned into a song by the Band, "The W.S. Walcott Medicine Show," with the name altered so the lyric was easier to sing.)

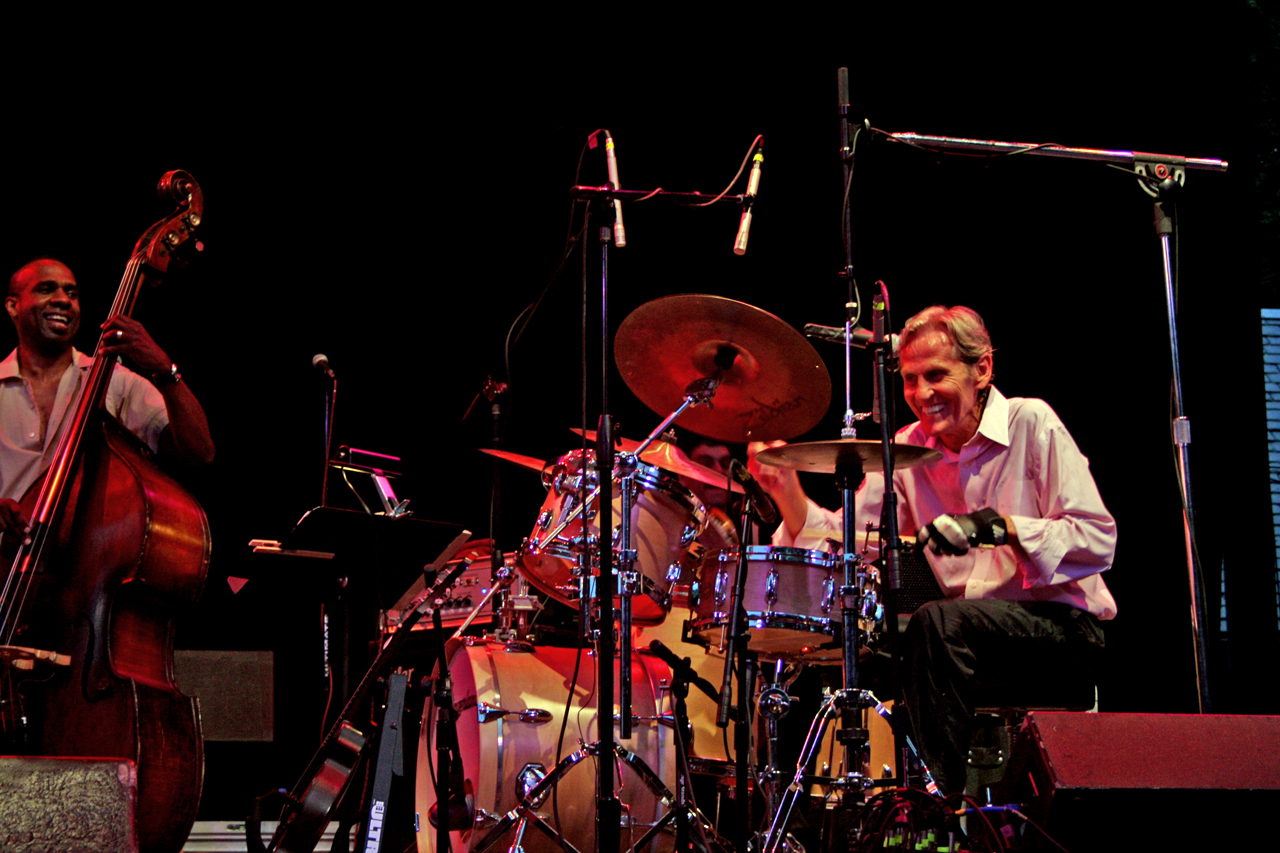
Helm performing in Central Park, New York, 2007

"After the finale, they'd have the midnight ramble," Helm told Scorsese. With young children off the premises, the show resumed: "The songs would get a little bit juicier. The jokes would get a little funnier and the prettiest dancer would really get down and shake it a few times. A lot of the rock and roll duck walks and moves came from that."

During this period, Helm switched to the matched grip and adopted a less busy, greatly simplified drumming style, as opposed to the traditional grip he used during his years with the Band.

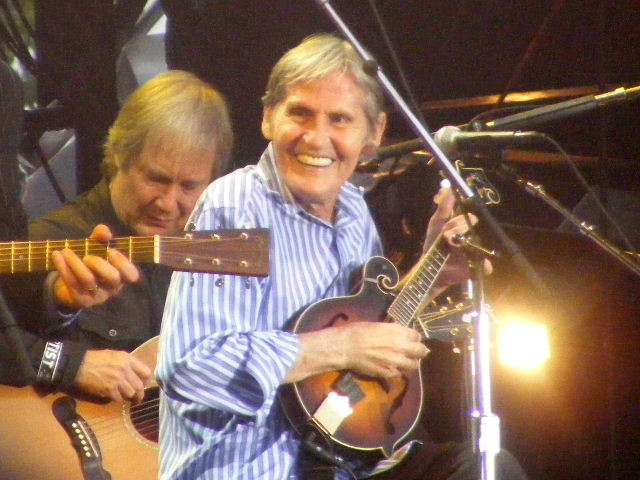
The Levon Helm Band performing at Austin City Limits Music Festival 2009

Helm was busy touring every year during the 2000s, generally traveling by tour bus to venues in eastern Canada and the eastern United States. After 2007, he performed in large venues such as the Beacon Theatre in New York City. Dr. John and Warren Haynes (the Allman Brothers Band, Gov't Mule) and Garth Hudson played at the concerts along with several other guests. At a show in Vancouver, Elvis Costello joined to sing "Tears of Rage". The Alexis P. Suter Band was a frequent opening act. Helm was a favorite of radio personality Don Imus and was frequently featured on Imus in the Morning. In the summer of 2009, a reality television series centering on the Midnight Ramble reportedly was in development.

In 2012, Levon Helm and his "midnight rambles" were featured on the PBS Arts site "Sound Tracks: Music Without Borders", including a poignant last interview with PBS's Marco Werman.

=== Dirt Farmer and comeback ===
The autumn of 2007 had the release of Dirt Farmer, Helm's first studio solo album since 1982. Dedicated to his parents and co-produced by his daughter Amy, the album combines traditional tunes Levon recalled from his youth with newer songs (by Steve Earle, Paul Kennerley, and others), which flow from similar historical streams. The album was released to almost immediate critical acclaim and earned him a Grammy Award in the Traditional Folk Album category for 2007. Also in 2007, Helm recorded "Toolin' Around Woodstock", an album with Arlen Roth on which Levon played drums and sang "Sweet Little 16" and "Crying Time". This album also featured Levon's daughter Amy and Roth's daughter Lexie, along with Sonny Landreth and Bill Kirchen.

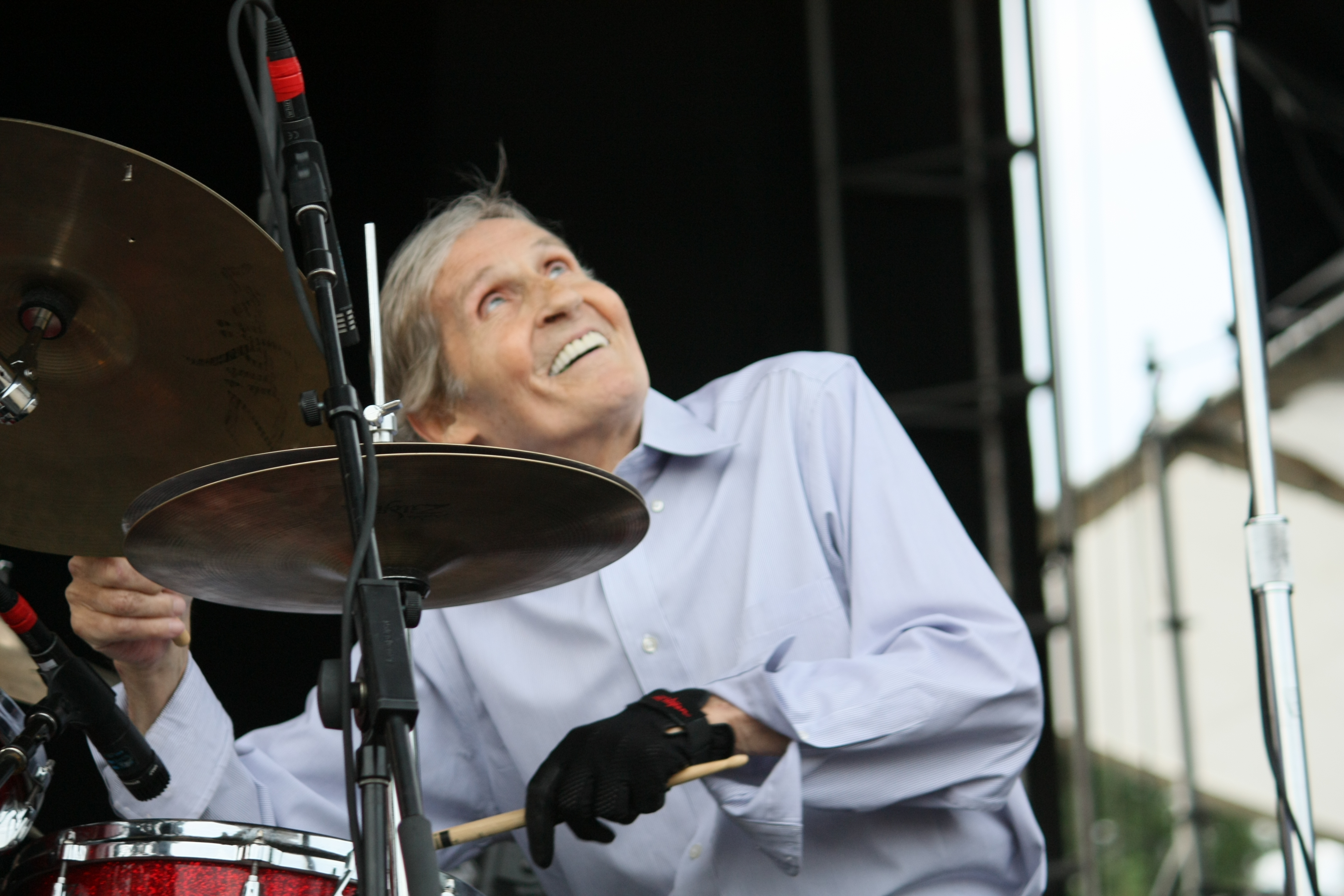
Levon Helm at Life is Good Festival in 2011

Helm declined to attend the Grammy Awards ceremony, instead holding a "Midnight Gramble" and celebrating the birth of his grandson, Lavon (Lee) Henry Collins.

In 2008, Helm performed at Warren Haynes's Mountain Jam Music Festival in Hunter, New York, playing alongside Haynes on the last day of the three-day festival. Helm also joined guitarist Bob Weir and his band RatDog on stage as they closed out the festival. Helm performed to great acclaim at the 2008 Bonnaroo Music Festival in Manchester, Tennessee.

Helm drummed on a couple of tracks for Jorma Kaukonen's February 2009 album River of Time, recorded at the Levon Helm Studios.

Helm released the album Electric Dirt on his own label on June 30, 2009. Like Dirt Farmer, an aim of Electric Dirt was to capture of feel of Helm's Midnight Rambles. The album won a best album Grammy for the newly created Americana category in 2010. Helm performed on the CBS television program Late Show with David Letterman on July 9, 2009. He also toured that same year in a supporting role with the band Black Crowes.

A documentary on Helm's day-to-day life titled Ain't in It for My Health: A Film About Levon Helm was released in March 2010. Directed by Jacob Hatley, it made its debut at the South by Southwest film festival in Austin, Texas, and went on to be screened at the Los Angeles Film Festival in June 2010. The film had a limited release in select theaters in the United States in the spring of 2013 and was released on DVD and Blu-ray later that year.

On May 11, 2011, Helm released Ramble at the Ryman, a live album recorded during his performance of September 17, 2008, at the Ryman Auditorium in Nashville. The album features Helm's band playing six songs by the Band and other cover material, including some songs from previous Helm solo releases. The album won the Grammy Award for Best Americana Album.

Some of his last sessions recorded in 2011 with Mavis Staples were released in 2022 as Carry Me Home.

== Legacy ==
George Harrison said that while writing his 1970 song "All Things Must Pass", he imagined Helm singing it.

Elton John's lyricist Bernie Taupin named the song "Levon" after Helm, although the song is not actually about him. Both John and Taupin said they were inspired by Helm, with Taupin saying during various interviews that he would "go down to their favourite record stores to buy The Band's records" along with Elton.

In 1994, Helm was inducted into the Rock and Roll Hall of Fame as a member of The Band.

Marc Cohn wrote the song "Listening to Levon" in 2007. "The Man behind the Drums", written by Robert Earl Keen and Bill Whitbeck, appeared on Keen's 2009 album The Rose Hotel. Tracy K. Smith's 2011 poem "Alternate Take", included in her Pulitzer Prize–winning collection Life on Mars, is dedicated to Helm. On the day of Helm's death, April 19, 2012, Tom Petty & the Heartbreakers, during a concert at the First Bank Center in Broomfield, Colorado, paid tribute to Levon by performing their song "The Best of Everything" and dedicating it to him.

At a concert on May 2, 2012, at the Prudential Center in Newark, NJ, Bruce Springsteen and the E Street Band performed "The Weight" as a tribute to Helm. Springsteen called Helm "one of the greatest, greatest voices in country, rockabilly and rock 'n' roll ... staggering ... while playing the drums. Both his voice and his drumming were so incredibly personal. He had a feel on the drums that comes out of certain place in the past and you can't replicate it." Springsteen also said it was one of the songs that he had played with drummer Max Weinberg in Weinberg's audition with the band.

On June 2, 2012, at Mountain Jam, Gov't Mule along with the Levon Helm Band (with Lukas Nelson coming on stage for the closing song) played a tribute set, including "The Night They Drove Old Dixie Down," "Up on Cripple Creek," "It Makes No Difference," and closing with "The Weight".

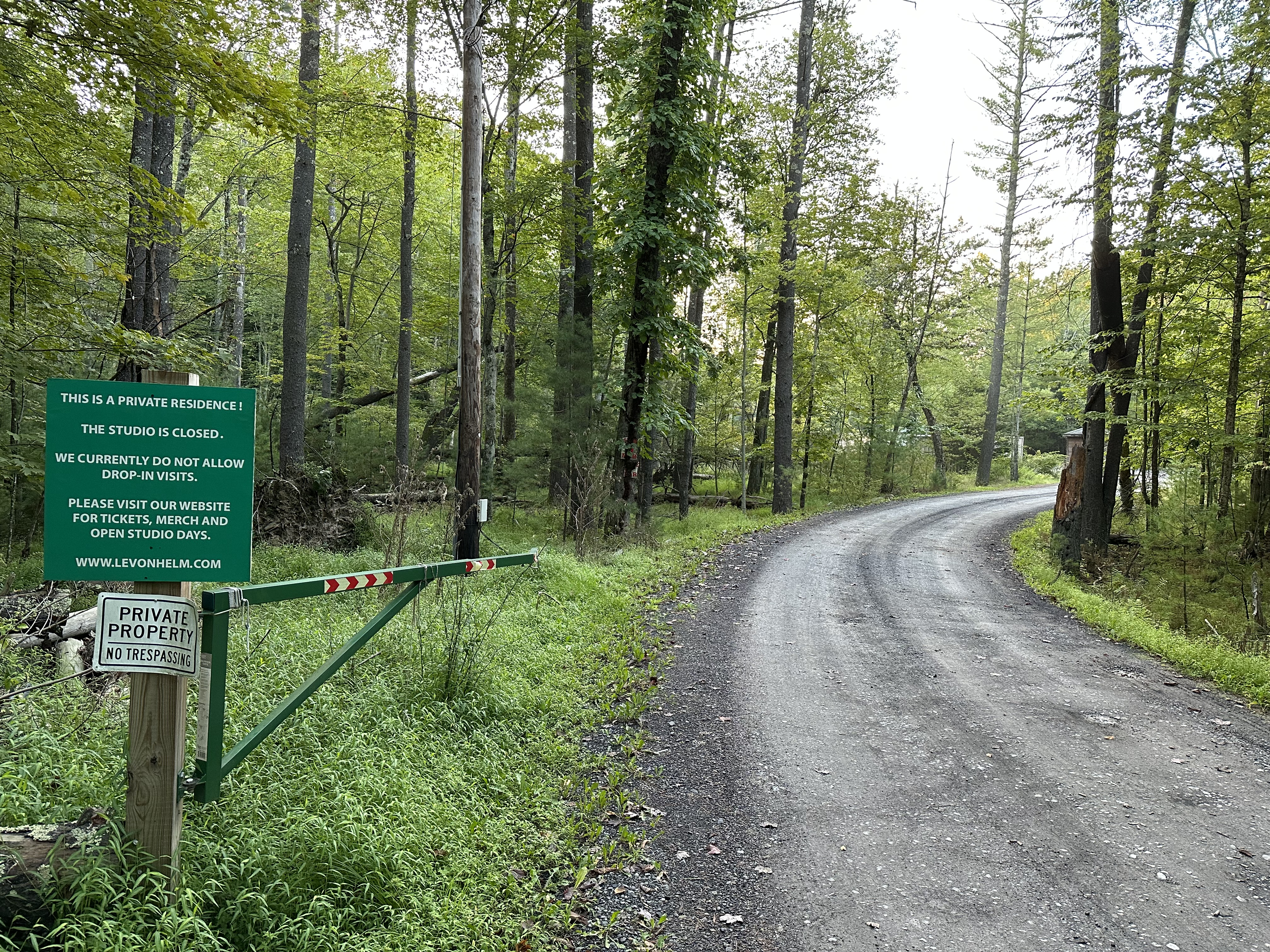
Gravel entrance road to ...

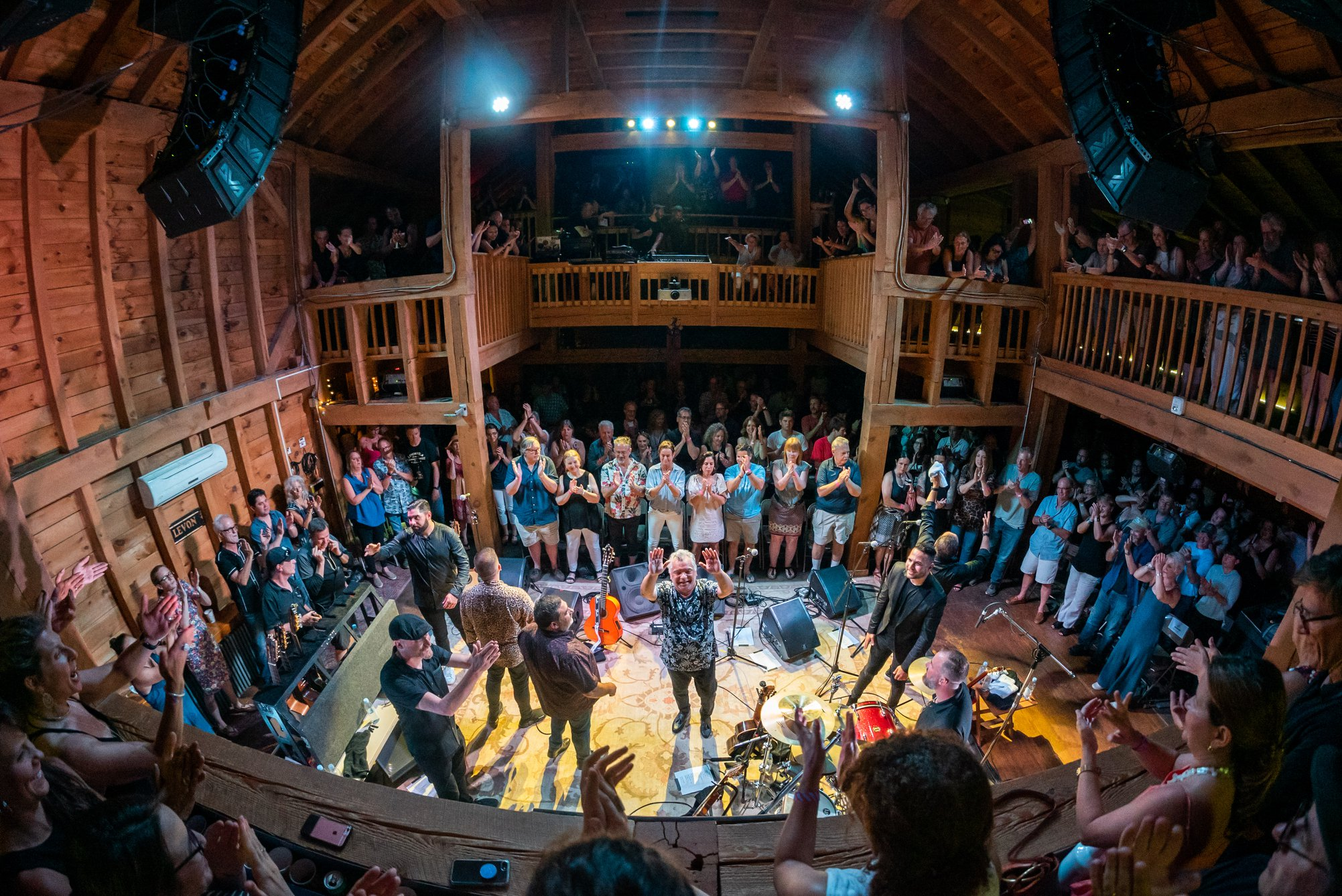
... and 2019 performance within, Levon Helm Studios in Woodstock

A tribute concert called Love for Levon took place at the Izod Center in East Rutherford, New Jersey, on October 3, 2012. The concert featured many special guests who had collaborated with and were inspired by Helm and The Band, including Roger Waters, Garth Hudson, Joe Walsh, Gregg Allman, Bruce Hornsby, Jorma Kaukonen, John Mayer, Mavis Staples, My Morning Jacket, Marc Cohn, John Hiatt, Allen Toussaint, Jakob Dylan, Mike Gordon, and others. Proceeds from the concert were to "help support the lasting legacy of Levon Helm by helping his estate keep ownership of his home, barn and studio, and to continue the Midnight Ramble Sessions".

At the 2013 Grammy Awards, the Zac Brown Band, Mumford & Sons, Elton John, Mavis Staples, T-Bone Burnett, and Alabama Shakes singer Brittany Howard performed "The Weight" as a tribute to Levon and other recently deceased musicians. They also dedicated the song to the victims of the Sandy Hook Elementary School shooting. In May 2013, the New York State Legislature approved a resolution to name State Route 375—the road that connects State Route 28 with the town of Woodstock—"Levon Helm Memorial Boulevard". Governor Andrew Cuomo signed the bill on June 20, 2013. In July 2017, U.S. 49 from Marvell, Arkansas, to Helena–West Helena was named The Levon Helm Memorial Highway by Act 810 of the Arkansas State Legislature. The Levon Helm Legacy Project is raising money to commission a bronze bust of Helm and to restore his boyhood home. The house, originally located in Turkey Scratch, Arkansas, was moved in 2015 to Marvell, where Helm attended school.

== Personal life ==
=== Family and relationships ===
Helm married a Canadian divorcée named Connie Orr (referred to in Robbie Robertson's memoir Testimony as "Connie B") in late 1962 in order to become a Canadian citizen and avoid the draft. Helm stated in his memoir that the relationship was “strictly platonic”, and that the two were still friends as of 1993. Orr's full name, the exact date of their marriage, and the date of their divorce are not known.

Helm first met singer-songwriter Libby Titus in July 1968, but the two did not begin a relationship until April 1969. Their daughter Amy Helm was born on 3 December 1970. Their relationship lasted until 1974, when, according to Helm, he and Titus decided to "make a break". Titus was initially married to novelist Barry Titus, who she divorced in 1968, and with whom she had a son named Ezra, who died in 2009. Titus remarried in 1993, to Donald Fagen of Steely Dan, who she remained married to until she died in October 2024.

Helm met Sandra Dodd in 1975 in California, possibly while he was still involved with Titus. Helm and Dodd were married on September 7, 1981. They had no children together. Dodd also allegedly did not allow Robertson to perform at Helm's Grammys tribute in 2013.

Helm's daughter Amy is a musician, was a founding member of the band Ollabelle, and has released several solo albums. She also performs in the "Helm Family Midnight Rambles" at Levon Helm Studios, which she is the current owner of. She has one son named Lavon Collins, who is a multi-instrumentalist and a current member of the band Roche Collins.

=== Health ===
Helm was a longtime smoker who struggled with heroin abuse.

In the late 1990s, Helm was diagnosed with throat cancer. Advised to undergo a laryngectomy, he instead underwent an arduous regimen of 27 radiation treatments. The tumor was then removed, but Helm lost his voice for a time. While his voice eventually returned, his "strong tenor" was "replaced by something raspy and ornery".

By April 2012, Helm's cancer had returned and had spread throughout his spine. During the 2012 Rock and Roll Hall of Fame induction ceremonies in Cleveland, Robbie Robertson sent "love and prayers" to Helm, fueling speculation about Helm's health. Helm had previously cancelled a number of performances, citing health issues or a slipped disk in his back. On April 17, 2012, Helm's wife Sandy and daughter Amy revealed that he had end-stage throat cancer. They posted the following message on Helm's website:

Dear Friends,

Levon is in the final stages of his battle with cancer. Please send your prayers and love to him as he makes his way through this part of his journey.

Thank you fans and music lovers who have made his life so filled with joy and celebration ... he has loved nothing more than to play, to fill the room up with music, lay down the back beat, and make the people dance! He did it every time he took the stage ...

We appreciate all the love and support and concern.

From his daughter Amy, and wife Sandy

On April 18, Robertson revealed on his Facebook page that he had a long visit with Helm at Memorial Sloan-Kettering Cancer Center the previous Sunday. On the same day, Garth Hudson posted on his personal website that he was "too sad for words". He then left a link for a video of the Alexis P. Suter Band and himself performing Bob Dylan's song "Knocking on Heaven's Door".

=== Death ===
Helm died on April 19, 2012, from complications of throat cancer at age 71.

Fans were invited to a public wake at Helm's Barn studio complex on April 26. Around 2,000 fans attended. The following day, after a private funeral service and a procession through the streets of Woodstock, Helm was interred in the Woodstock Cemetery, within sight of the grave of his longtime bandmate and friend Rick Danko. Former President Bill Clinton issued a statement following Helm's death.

== Discography ==
Studio albums

- Levon Helm & the RCO All-Stars (1977)
- Levon Helm (1978)
- American Son (1980)
- Levon Helm (1982)
- Souvenir, Vol. 1 with the Crowmatix (1998)
- Dirt Farmer (2007)
- Electric Dirt (2009)

Soundtrack

- Staying Together ("Lean on Me", "Hotel Buick", and "Big Love in a Small Town") (1989)

Other appearances

- "Blue Moon of Kentucky" – for Coal Miner's Daughter (1980)
- "Soulful Wind" – for Labour of Love: The Music of Nick Lowe (2001)
- "You Better Move On" – for The Imus Ranch Record (2008)
- "It Takes a Lot to Laugh, It Takes a Train to Cry" – for The Imus Ranch Record II (2010)
- "You'll Never Again Be Mine" – for The Lost Notebooks of Hank Williams (2011)

=== Live albums ===
- The Midnight Ramble Sessions, Volume One (2006)
- The Midnight Ramble Sessions, Volume Two (2006)
- Levon Helm & the RCO All Stars: Live at the Palladium NYC, New Years Eve 1977 (2006)
- FestivalLink.Net presents: Levon Helm Band MerleFest Ramble (MerleFest, NC 4/26/08)
- Ramble at the Ryman (2011)
- The Midnight Ramble Sessions, Volume Three (2014)
- Carry Me Home with Mavis Staples (2022)

=== Live appearances ===
- Musical guest performing "Sweet Peach Georgia Wine" and "Summertime Blues" with the Cate Brothers Band, and interacting with Eugene Levy, on Episode #79 ("One on the Town"), Second City Television Network ("SCTV") May 15, 1981
- "Going Back to Memphis" with James Cotten – for The Mississippi River of Song: A Musical Journey Down the Mississippi (1998)

=== Session work ===
With Ronnie Earl

- Ronnie Earl and Friends (2001)

With John P. Hammond

- So Many Roads (1965)

With Muddy Waters

- The Muddy Waters Woodstock Album (Chess, 1975)

With Eric Clapton

- No Reason to Cry (RSO, 1976)

With Paul Burlison

- Train Kept a-Rollin' (1997)

With Jorma Kaukonen

- River of Time (2009)

Other

- The Legend of Jesse James (1980)

== Filmography ==
Levon Helm performances and appearances
Year	Title	Role	Notes
1978	The Last Waltz	Himself – drums / mandolin / vocal	Documentary
1980	Coal Miner's Daughter	Ted Webb	
1982	Seven Brides for Seven Brothers	Stormy Weathers	Episode: "Catch a Falling Star"
1983	The Right Stuff	Jack Ridley / Narrator	
1984	The Dollmaker	Clovis	TV movie
1984	Best Revenge	Bo	
1985	Smooth Talk	Harry	
1987	End of the Line	Leo Pickett	
1987	Man Outside	Sheriff Leland Laughlin	
1989	Staying Together	Denny Stockton	
1990	The Wall – Live in Berlin		Video documentary
1993	The 30th Anniversary Concert Celebration |Himself-drums| |The Band performs for Bob Dylan’s 30th Anniversary celebration with Columbia records|		
1996	Feeling Minnesota	Bible Salesman	
1997	Fire Down Below	Rev. Goodall	
1997	Classic Albums: The Band - The Band	Himself	Video documentary
1998	The Adventures of Sebastian Cole	Juvie Bob	
2003	Festival Express	Himself – The Band	Documentary
2005	The Three Burials of Melquiades Estrada	Old Man with Radio	
2005	The Life and Hard Times of Guy Terrifico	Himself	
2007	Shooter	Mr. Rate	
2008	Only Halfway Home	Helm – Levon	
2009	Levon Helm: Ramble At The Ryman	Himself	Concert film
2009	In the Electric Mist	General John Bell Hood	Final acting role
2010	Ain't in It for My Health – A Film about Levon Helm	Himself	Documentary

Awards
Preceded by Emmylou Harris	AMA Lifetime Achievement Award for Performing; 2003	Succeeded by Chris Hillman
Preceded by Patty Griffin	AMA Artist of the Year; 2008	Succeeded by Buddy Miller
