= Production of Watchmen (2009 film) =

Teaser poster drawn by Watchmen illustrator Dave Gibbons for the 2007 Comic-Con International

Watchmen is a 2009 film based on the twelve-issue graphic novel series of the same name created by writer Alan Moore, artist Dave Gibbons, and colorist John Higgins, published by DC Comics between 1986 and 1987. The graphic novel's film rights were acquired by producer Lawrence Gordon in 1986. Many problems halted the adaptation's development, with four different studios and various directors and screenwriters being attached to the project through twenty years. In 2006, Zack Snyder, who at the time was filming another comic book adaptation, was hired by Warner Bros. to helm Watchmen. Filming started in 2007, and following deals with two of the previous companies involved in the development—Paramount Pictures was responsible for international distribution rights after budgetary issues in 2004, resulting in a lawsuit by 20th Century Fox. Fox, which was already contacted by Gordon in 1987, received $1 million of the gross—the Watchmen adaptation was finally released in March 2009.

== Pre-production ==
=== Failed projects ===
In August 1986, producer Lawrence Gordon acquired the film rights to Watchmen for 20th Century Fox, with producer Joel Silver working on the film. Fox asked author Alan Moore to write a screenplay based on his story, but when Moore declined the studio enlisted screenwriter Sam Hamm. On September 9, 1988, Hamm turned in his first draft, but said that condensing a 338-page, nine-panel-a-page comic book into a 128-page script was arduous. He took the liberty of re-writing Watchmen's complicated ending into a "more manageable" conclusion involving an assassination and a time paradox. Fox put the film into turnaround in 1991, and Gordon set up the project at a new company, Largo International, with Fox distributing the film. Although Largo closed three years later, Fox was promised that they would be involved if the project was revived.

Gordon and Silver moved the project to DC Comics' parent company, Warner Bros., where Terry Gilliam was attached to direct. Unsatisfied with how Hamm's script fleshed out the characters, Gilliam brought in Charles McKeown to rewrite it. The second draft, which was credited to Gilliam, Warren Skaaren, and Hamm rather than McKeown, used the character Rorschach's journal as a voice-over, and restored scenes from the comic book that Hamm had removed. According to Watchmen artist Dave Gibbons, filming was to take place at Pinewood Studios. Silver wanted to cast Arnold Schwarzenegger as Dr. Manhattan. Because both Gilliam and Silver's previous films, The Adventures of Baron Munchausen and Die Hard 2 respectively, went over budget, they were only able to raise $25 million for the film—a quarter of the necessary budget. As a result, Gilliam abandoned the project, and ultimately decided that Watchmen was unfilmable. Gilliam explained, "Reducing [the story] to a two or two-and-a-half hour film [...] seemed to me to take away the essence of what Watchmen is about." When Warner Bros. dropped the project, Gordon invited Gilliam back to helm the film independently. Gilliam again declined, believing that the comic book would be better directed as a five-hour miniseries.

"[Watchmen] was considered too dark, too complex, too 'smart'. But the world has changed [after the September 11, 2001 attacks]. I think that the new global climate has finally caught up with the vision that Alan Moore had in 1986. It is the perfect time to make this movie."

— David Hayter, in October 2001, on the project's timing

In October 2001, Gordon and Universal Studios signed screenwriter David Hayter to write and direct Watchmen in a "seven-figure deal". Hayter hoped to begin filming in early 2002, but did not turn in his first draft until July 2002. In May 2003, Hayter said he had Alan Moore's blessing on the film, despite Moore's disagreement with the project since its first incarnation. In July 2003, Watchmen producer Lloyd Levin announced the completion of Hayter's script, which he called "a great adaptation [...] that absolutely celebrates the book". Ultimately, Hayter and the producers left Universal over creative differences, and in October 2003, Gordon and Levin expressed interest in setting up Watchmen at Revolution Studios. The pair intended to shoot the film in Prague, but the project fell apart at Revolution Studios.

In July 2004, it was announced Paramount Pictures would produce Watchmen, and they hired Darren Aronofsky to direct Hayter's script. Gordon and Levin remained attached, collaborating with Aronofsky's producing partner, Eric Watson. Eventually, Aronofsky left to focus on The Fountain, and Paramount replaced him with Paul Greengrass, with a target release date of summer 2006. At this time, Paddy Considine was involved in negotiations for Rorschach. Jude Law (a fan of the comic) and Tom Cruise both lobbied for Ozymandias. Greengrass wanted Joaquin Phoenix for Dan Dreiberg and Hilary Swank as Laurie. To publicize the film, Paramount launched a now-defunct Watchmen teaser website that had a message board as well as computer wallpaper available to download. Graphic artist Tristan Schane drew designs of Dr. Manhattan for the film, which depicted him with visible intestines. Gilliam read Greengrass's revision of Hayter's script and liked it, but told Greengrass he did not think the studio would greenlight such a dark film. In March 2005, with rumors that high-profile projects, including Watchmen, were in danger of being cut, Paramount's CEO Donald De Line began urging a reduction in Watchmen's budget so the film could get the greenlight. When Brad Grey took over as Paramount's CEO, Levin feared potential budget cuts, so he made plans to move the project outside the United Kingdom in an effort to save money. Before he could, Paramount placed Watchmen in turnaround, again. In March 2019, concept footage from David Hayter's project was released on Supervoid Cinema's YouTube channel, featuring Iain Glen in the role of Nite-Owl and Ray Stevenson in the role of Rorschach.

In October 2005, Gordon and Levin began talks with Warner Bros., originally the second studio to be attached to Watchmen, and confirmed in December 2005 that Warner Bros. had picked up the film, but that Greengrass was no longer attached to direct. In addition, the film was marked as an "open writing assignment", which meant David Hayter's script would be put aside. Despite this change, Hayter expressed his hope that his script would be used by Warner Bros. and that he would be attached to direct his "dream project".

=== Successful development ===
After Warner Bros. officially became involved, the studio claimed that because Paramount had not fully reimbursed Universal for its development costs, Paramount had no legal claim over the film rights. Therefore, it would not be entitled to co-finance the film with Warner Bros. After negotiations between the studios, they agreed that Paramount would own 25% of the film and would distribute it outside North America. Impressed with Zack Snyder's work on the film 300, an adaptation of Frank Miller's comic book of the same name, Warner Bros. approached him to direct an adaptation of Watchmen. After spending a couple of weeks deciding whether he wanted to direct the film or not, Warner Bros. officially announced Snyder’s hiring on June 23, 2006, with Alex Tse attached to write the script. Drawing from "the best elements" from two of Hayter’s drafts, Tse’s script returned to the original Cold War setting of the Watchmen comic. Warner Bros. was open to keeping the 1980s setting, although less so to the R-rating that Snyder wanted; Snyder also decided to add a title montage sequence to introduce the audience to the alternate history of the United States that the film presented. Snyder kept the ending from one of Hayter's drafts, which simplified details of the conspiracy within the story, because he felt it would allow more screen time to explore characters' backstories.

"I didn't update [the 1985 setting] for a couple of reasons. I thought Nixon was important to the movie. He's not in the movie a lot, but [his presence] says a lot, [especially about] what a villain is. In the graphic novel, he's written with a lot of ambiguity of whether he's a bad guy or not. [Also] if you update this and make it about the war on terror, you're now asking me to make a comment of how I feel about the war on terror. This way, it's up to you how you decide to feel about it."

— Zack Snyder

Snyder said that he wanted the film to hold the same level of detail that was contained within the comic, with all of the easter eggs that were hidden within each frame of the comic's panels. As such, Snyder used the comic book as his storyboard, travelling with a copy and making notes on its pages. Next to the novel, Snyder cited Taxi Driver and Seven as visual influences. To make the film more topical, Snyder emphasized the existing subplot concerning energy resources. Roberto Orci and Alex Kurtzman met with Snyder twice during the later stages of pre-production to further revise the script, although Snyder explained the script was merely a document for the studio, and it was his storyboards that were his true guide while making the movie. James Kakalios, author of The Physics of Superheroes, was also hired as a scientific consultant.

== Production ==
Snyder hoped to have principal photography take place from June–September 2007, but filming was delayed until September 17, 2007. Snyder wanted a $150 million budget, but Warner Bros. preferred the budget remain under $100 million; the film ultimately finished with a budget of approximately $120 million. The production took place in Vancouver, where a New York City back lot was built. Sound stages were used for apartments and offices, while sequences on Mars and Antarctica were shot against green screens. Ten visual effects companies, Sony Pictures Imageworks and Intelligent Creatures among them, came on board to work on the film, which ended up having 1,100 shots featuring effects, a quarter of them being computer-generated imagery.

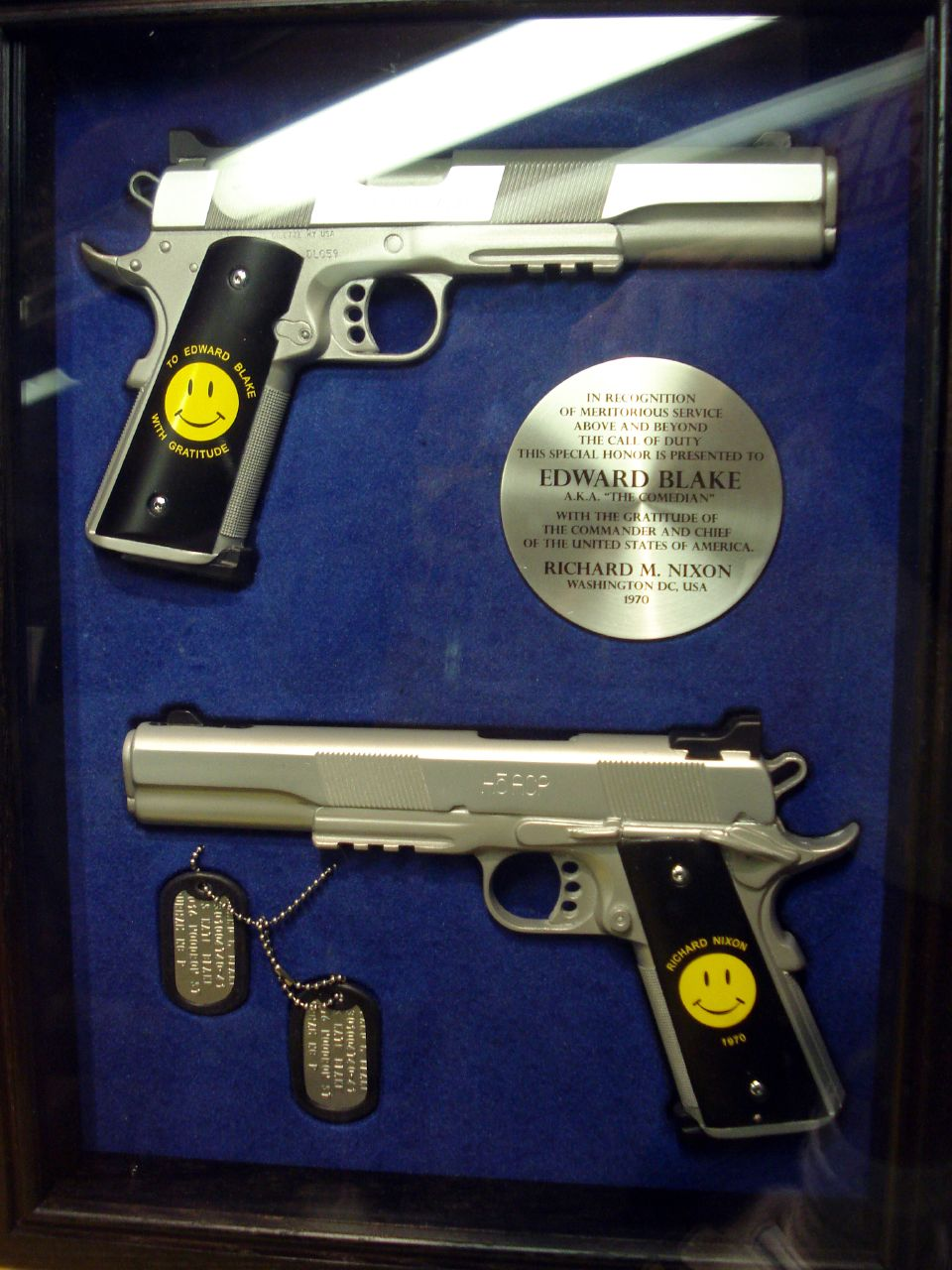
The Comedian's handguns on display at the 2008 Comic-Con

Comic book artists Adam Hughes and John Cassaday were hired to work on character and costume designs for the film. Costume tests were being done by March 2007. 300 associate producer Wesley Coller portrayed Rorschach in a costume test, which Snyder inserted into a trailer that accompanied the release of 300. Although he intended to stay faithful to the look of the characters in the comic, Snyder wanted Nite Owl to look scarier and Ozymandias to possess authentic Egyptian attire and artifacts. Ultimately, Oyzmandias, Nite Owl and Silk Spectre changed most from the comic, as Snyder felt "audiences might not appreciate the naiveté of the original costumes. So, there has been some effort to give them a [...] modern look—and not modern in the sense of 2007, but modern in terms of the superhero aesthetic". Costume designer Michael Wilkinson added that the costumes had to look realistic and protective, and that the Nite Owl costume should reflect Dan's interest in aerodynamics. The chain mail in his costume resemble a bird's feathers. Snyder also wanted the costumes to "comment directly on many of today’s modern masked vigilantes": The Ozymandias costume, with its molded muscles and nipples, parodies the costumes in Batman Forever and Batman & Robin. Throughout filming, Snyder also kept adding in dialogue to mention more of the characters' backstories so the film would be as faithful as possible.

Production designer Alex McDowell intended Nixon's war room to pay tribute to the war room in the film Dr. Strangelove. He also wanted Dr. Manhattan's apartment, which is inside his laboratory, to look like the work of Maison Jansen, explaining that "the powers that be, who know nothing about design, but needed [Manhattan] to feel like he was the most important guy in America". The apartment also echoes the film The Man Who Fell to Earth, with a book prop named Masterpieces in Paint and Poetry and a tennis courtroom with similar wallpaper. Set designers selected four Kansas City sculptors' works for use on the set of Dr. Manhattan's apartment, after discovering their works on the Internet. Filming ended on February 19, 2008.

== Post-production ==
=== Music ===
Composer Tyler Bates began scoring Watchmen in November 2007. He planned to visit the shoot for a week during each month, and view assembly cuts of scenes to begin rough composing. Snyder and Bates listened to the soundtracks of 1980s films such as Manhunter, Blade Runner, and To Live and Die in L.A. for inspiration. Bates switched between a Yamaha CS-80 or an MOTM for moments that he felt should have more ambience or synthesizers. Snyder wanted a scene where Nite Owl and Silk Spectre rescue people from a burning building to have a more traditional superhero feel, so Bates implemented a four to the floor guitar rhythm. A 64-strong choir and the 87-piece ensemble from the Hollywood Studio Symphony were hired for the more orchestral themes.

The film uses some of the songs mentioned in the comic. Bates said the challenge was composing music that would transition effectively into these famous songs. One of the songs is "The Times They Are a-Changin'" by Bob Dylan from whom Snyder and Bates received permission to use the stems so the three-minute song could play over the six-minute opening montage. My Chemical Romance, whose members are fans of the comic, covered Dylan's "Desolation Row" for the first half of the closing credits. The film also features two pieces from Philip Glass' score to 1982 film Koyaanisqatsi accompanying the birth of Dr. Manhattan.

Two albums, Watchmen: Music from the Motion Picture and Watchmen: Original Motion Picture Score were released on February 24, 2009 by Warner Sunset and Reprise Records. Additionally, a 12" vinyl picture disc was released on January 27, 2009. The A-side features My Chemical Romance's cover version of "Desolation Row", and the B-side features "Prison Fight" composed by Tyler Bates for the film's score. Both songs will also be featured on the Music From the Motion Picture and Original Motion Picture Soundtrack albums, respectively. A box set consisting of seven 7" picture disks was released on March 24, 2009. This set will also include My Chemical Romance performing "Desolation Row", as well as thirteen tracks from the Tyler Bates score.

=== Editing ===
Snyder's first cut of the film was three hours long. In keeping the film tight, Snyder dubbed himself "the gatekeeper" of the comic's easter eggs, "while [the studio] conspire to say, 'No. Length, length, length. Playability.' [...] I've lost perspective on that now, because to me, the honest truth is I geek out on little stuff now as much as anybody. Like, people will go, 'We've got to cut. You don't need that shot of Hollis Mason's garage sign.' And I'm like, 'What are you talking about? Of course you do. Are you crazy? How will people enjoy the movie without shit like that in it?' So it's hard for me." Snyder cut the film down to 162 minutes when he realized there was a way to further trim the film: removing the murder of Hollis Mason, the first Nite Owl, which "was easy without destroying the movie".

=== Moore and Gibbons' involvement ===
When 20th Century Fox acquired the film rights to Watchmen, the comic's writer Alan Moore was initially excited about the film adaptation. In a 1987 edition of Comics Interview, he revealed Sam Hamm, who was attached to write, visited him in Northampton for lunch and that he felt Hamm would provide an adaptation faithful to the comic's spirit. Ultimately, Hamm's script altered the ending, having Adrian Veidt die and Dr. Manhattan alter time so that Jon Osterman is not affected by the radiation. As a result, the remaining characters are teleported to the real world created as a result of time travel. In an interview with Variety's Danny Graydon, during Warner Bros.'s first possession of feature film rights for Watchmen, Moore changed his mind, adamantly opposing a film adaptation of his comic book. Moore felt that, contrary to others' opinion, the comic book was not cinematic. When he was approached by Terry Gilliam on how to film the comic book, Moore stated that he "didn't think it was filmable". Moore clarified for Graydon, "I didn't design it to show off the similarities between cinema and comics, which are there, but in my opinion are fairly unremarkable. It was designed to show off the things that comics could do that cinema and literature couldn't."

In December 2001, Moore further explained his opposition, citing how a reader can take the time to absorb the character backgrounds, by having the option of turning back the pages so that they can connect elements they had just read to past elements, but that film forces you to watch the story at 24 frames per second. Moore's opposition to the film adaptation crystallized after the 2003 film version of The League of Extraordinary Gentlemen was released, and he intended to give any resulting royalties from Watchmen to the comic's artist, Dave Gibbons. In Moore’s opinion, Hayter's script was the closest anyone could get to the original comic, but added that he would not be going to see the film when completed. Moore said, "My book is a comic book. Not a movie, not a novel. A comic book. It's been made in a certain way, and designed to be read a certain way: in an armchair, nice and cozy next to a fire, with a steaming cup of coffee."

In November 2006, Zack Snyder said that he hoped to speak to Moore before filming, though the writer had sworn off involvement with film or television productions after his disagreement over the V for Vendetta film adaptation. Moore signed a deal to go uncredited on the film, and for his share of the income be given to Gibbons, as he had done on V for Vendetta. Before filming began, Snyder said, "[I] totally respect his wishes to not be involved in the movie." Moore expressed discontent over the choice of Snyder, saying that he "had a lot of problems" with the comic book 300 and that, while he had not seen it, he had heard that Snyder's film adaptation was racist, homophobic, and "sublimely stupid".

In an early interview with Entertainment Weekly's Ken Tucker, Watchmen artist Dave Gibbons said that he thought the time had passed to make a Watchmen movie. Gibbons felt that the window to make a Watchmen movie was during the success of the 1989 Batman film. When that time passed, Gibbons also told Neon magazine that he was "[…] glad because it wouldn't have been up to the book". Gibbons felt it would probably be better adapted as a television series like The Prisoner. When given the opportunity, Gibbons enjoyed the script by Alex Tse. Gibbons gave Snyder some script advice, which Snyder accepted. He drew licensing art for the film, consulted on merchandise and the webcomics, publicized the film with Snyder, and wrote a tie-in book about the creation of the comic, entitled Watching the Watchmen. Moore did not mind Gibbons' involvement and felt it did not have any impact on their friendship. Snyder asked Gibbons to draw up a storyboard for the film's altered ending, which the comics' colorist John Higgins also returned to work on. Gibbons believed watching the film on DVD would emulate flipping through the book, with viewers pausing or rewinding the film to catch details.

=== Litigation ===
On February 14, 2008, 20th Century Fox brought a lawsuit against Warner Bros. that alleged copyright infringement on the Watchmen film property. The studio believed it held the rights to produce the film, or at least distribute it, no matter how many studios Watchmen passed through, and sought to block its release. Warner Bros. said that Fox repeatedly failed to exercise its rights over various incarnations of the production. Through producer Lawrence Gordon, Fox had bought the rights to the comic book in 1986. Fox alleges that when it put the project into turnaround in 1994, a separate 1991 deal that transferred some of the rights to Gordon still gave them the option of distribution, sequel rights, and a share of the profits should it be made by any other studio. Fox's interpretation of the 1994 turnaround deal also meant that Gordon would not fully control the rights until the studio's development costs—estimated by Fox at $1 million—had been reimbursed. Despite originally passing on the project, Fox also alleged that its agreement with Gordon contained a "changed elements" clause, meaning that if Gordon changed any of the key creative personnel on the film, Fox would have first option on participation, claiming that Gordon did not inform them of Snyder's joining the production in 2005.

Fox alleged that it contacted Warner Bros. before production began in 2005, and told the studio that it had violated Fox's 1991 and 1994 deals with Gordon. Warner Bros. claimed that it was originally unaware of either deal, and that in 2005 Fox had declined to produce the Hayter screenplay that formed the basis of the production. Warner Bros. also claimed that the 1994 deal did not cover distribution rights and had conferred upon Gordon all the rights he needed to take the film to Warner Bros. The studio's motion to dismiss the case in August 2008 was rejected by the judge.

On December 24, 2008, Judge Gary A. Feess granted 20th Century Fox's claim to a copyright interest in the film. An attorney for 20th Century Fox said that the studio would seek an order to delay the release of Watchmen. Producer Lloyd Levin revealed in an open letter that in 2005 both Fox and Warner Bros. were offered the chance to make Watchmen. Fox passed on the project while Warner Bros. made a deal to acquire the movie rights and move forward with development. An internal Fox email documented that executives at Fox felt the script was "one of the most unintelligible pieces of shit they had read in years". On January 15, 2009, the trade press reported that Fox and Warner Bros. had reached a settlement. Fox would receive a share of the box office, but no future ownership of the film. The settlement awarded Fox up to $10 million in development costs and legal fees, plus worldwide gross participation scaling from 5% to 8.5%.
