= Ollabelle =

American folk music group

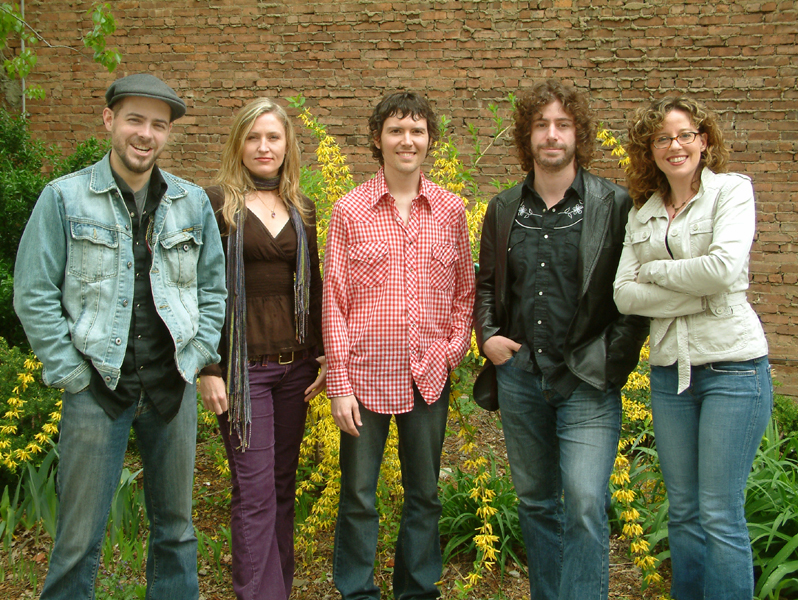
- Ollabelle in 2005

Background information
- Genres: Folk
- Years active: 2004–present
- Label: Sony / Verve Forecast
- Members: Amy Helm; Glenn Patscha; Byron Isaacs; Fiona McBain; Tony Leone
- Past members: Jimi Zhivago
- Website: www.ollabellemusic.net

Ollabelle is a New York–based folk music group named after the influential Appalachian songwriter Ola Belle Reed. The group is composed of five singing multi-instrumentalists hailing from disparate parts of the United States, Canada and Australia.

== History ==
Ollabelle formed during the post-9/11 days of 2001 at Sunday night gospel music sessions humorously dubbed "Sunday School for Sinners" held in a small bar called 9C (so named for its location at the corner of East 9th Street and Avenue C on Manhattan's Lower East Side). Their individual talents and musical tastes fused together to provide a unique musical experience influenced by various genres such as gospel, traditional/folk, blues, bluegrass, rock, soul, and even jazz. The group was featured on the National Public Radio program All Things Considered in a 2004 segment, and was part of bluegrass/country artist Alison Krauss' national Great High Mountain Tour (2004) which in addition to Ms. Krauss also featured the revered American traditional artist Ralph Stanley. The past several years have seen Ollabelle on the road touring many states including Alaska, several European countries, and they have also played at the 2004 Newport Folk Festival, the 2007 South by Southwest music event held annually in Austin, Texas, and North Carolina's MerleFest, (2008). More recently, Ollabelle toured as part of "The American Beauty Project" a live presentation of songs from the classic Grateful Dead album American Beauty in which Ollabelle do their interpretations of several songs including "Brokedown Palace". The American Beauty Project released a 2-CD live recording in 2007 featuring Ollabelle, Jim Lauderdale, Larry Campbell, Teresa Williams, Catherine Russell & David Gans. Ollabelle served as the house band for the Simon & Garfunkel tribute show at New York's Central Park Summerstage in June 2010.

Ollabelle's members continually add traditional and original material to their live performances. Ollabelle's first album (Ollabelle) was produced by the legendary T-Bone Burnett while their second album (Riverside Battle Songs) was co-produced with former Bob Dylan sideman Larry Campbell. Several members of Ollabelle guest on the 2006 album by American folk-blues artist Chris Smither entitled Leave the Light On and 2009 has seen the release of Before This Time an album culled from live performances featuring both old and new material.

Two members of Ollabelle, vocalist/mandola player Amy Helm and bassist/vocalist Byron Isaacs, are regular members of the Levon Helm Band (the late Levon Helm was Amy's father) and perform at Levon's Midnight Ramble concerts. Other Ollabelle members have occasionally joined up with the Levon Helm Band, including Tony Leone, who sometimes sat in on drums with the band while Levon Helm stepped out front and played mandolin.

Since leaving Ollabelle, Jimi Zhivago has focused on a solo career, as well as production for other artists. Most notably, he has recorded multiple times with singer-songwriter Kim Taylor, including 2006's I Feel Like a Fading Light and 2010's Little Miracle EP.

Since 2013, bassist Byron Isaacs has been the touring bassist and backing vocalist for The Lumineers, and has appeared on three of their albums, Cleopatra, III and Brightside. He has also released a solo album, Disappearing Man.

== Members ==
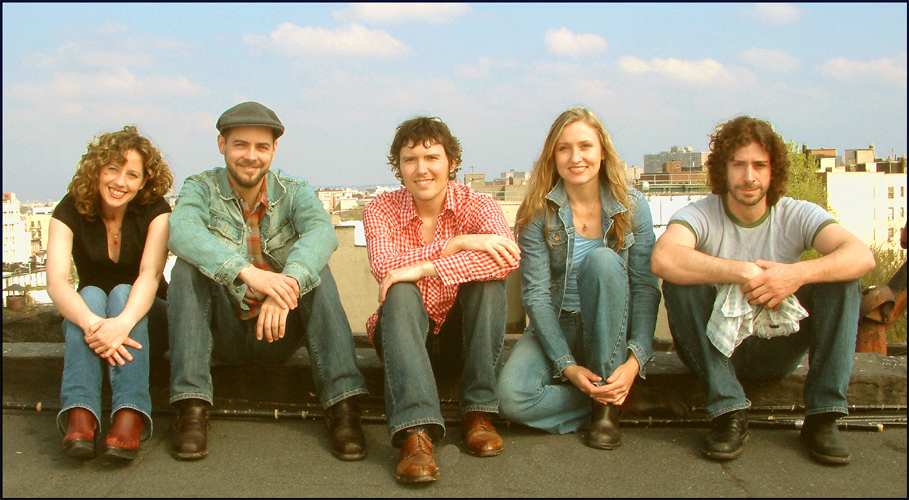
Ollabelle in Brooklyn, New York

Ollabelle consists of (as pictured left to right):

- Amy Helm – vocals, mandola
- Glenn Patscha – vocals, keyboards, accordion
- Byron Isaacs – vocals, bass, guitar, dobro
- Fiona McBain – vocals, acoustic and electric guitars, electric bass
- Tony Leone – vocals, drums, percussion, mandolin

Former member

- Jimi Zhivago – electric guitar, vocals

== Discography ==
- Ollabelle (2004)
- Riverside Battle Songs (2006)
- Before This Time (2009)
- Neon Blue Bird (2011)
