= Down in the Flood =

Song by Bob Dylan

from the album Bob Dylan's Greatest Hits Vol. II
- Published: 1967
- Released: November 17, 1971
- Recorded: September 24, 1971
- Genre: Folk rock; folk blues
- Songwriter: Bob Dylan

"Down in the Flood" is a song by Bob Dylan, originally recorded by Dylan in 1967 with the Band, and copyrighted that autumn. On some albums, it is listed as "Crash on the Levee", an alternate title. One of the 1967 recordings was released on the 1975 album The Basement Tapes and re-released in 2014 on The Bootleg Series Vol. 11: The Basement Tapes Complete, along with a preceding take.

Dylan re-recorded the song with Happy Traum in September 1971 using slightly different chords for inclusion on Bob Dylan's Greatest Hits Vol. II.

A live version performed with the Band in the early hours of January 1, 1972 was released on the 2001 reissue of the Band's Rock Of Ages.

Dylan's July 2002 re-recording of the song featured on the album, Masked & Anonymous: Music from the Motion Picture, the soundtrack to the 2003 film Masked & Anonymous.

== Cover versions ==
Sandy Denny covered the song on her 1971 album The North Star Grassman and the Ravens, as did The Derek Trucks Band for their 2009 Grammy Award-winning album Already Free. Blood, Sweat & Tears also covered the song on their fifth album, New Blood released in 1972 with Jerry Fisher singing lead.

Lester Flatt and Earl Scruggs also covered the song on their 1968 album, Changin' Times.

Chris Smither covered this song on his 1972 release Don't It Drag On, and again on his 1991 release, Another Way to Find You.

Mike Finnigan (keyboards, harmonica and vocals) and Jerry Wood (guitar) covered the tune on their 1972 Blue Thumb album, Crazed Hipsters.
