= It Ain't Easy =

It Ain't Easy may refer to:

- It Ain't Easy (film), a 1972 American film
- It Ain't Easy (Three Dog Night album) (1970)
- It Ain't Easy (Long John Baldry album) (1971)
- It Ain't Easy (Janie Fricke album) (1982)
- It Ain't Easy (Chris Smither album) (1984)
- "It Ain't Easy" (Ron Davies song)
- "It Ain't Easy" (Sugababes song)
- "It Ain't Easy", a song by Ratt from their self-titled album
- "It Ain't Easy", a song by Robert Forster from the album The Evangelist
- "It Ain't Easy", a song by Tupac Shakur from the album Me Against the World
- "It Ain't Easy (On Your Own)", a 2004 song by Ricky Fanté

== See also ==
- "Ain't Easy", a 2018 song by Elijah Woods x Jamie Fine
