= Happier Blue =

Studio album by Chris Smither
- Released: 1993
- Genre: Blues, folk
- Length: 50:17
- Label: Flying Fish, HighTone
- Producer: John Nagy

Chris Smither chronology
Another Way to Find You (1991)	Happier Blue (1993)	Up on the Lowdown (1995)

Happier Blue is an album by American singer/songwriter Chris Smither, released in 1993. It won a National American Independent Record Distributors (NAIRD) award.

== Reception ==
Professional ratings
Review scores
Source	Rating
Allmusic	4.5/5 stars
Robert Christgau	

Writing for Allmusic, critic Richard Meyer wrote of the album "All the elements of Chris Smither's distinctive style are here: passionate vocals, his cool songs, and some covers." Music critic Robert Christgau gave the album a two-star honorable mention and briefly commented "expansive new songs, congenial new band, and the stompingest foot this side of John Lee Hooker"

== Track listing ==
All songs by Chris Smither unless otherwise noted.

1. "Happier Blue"
2. "Memphis in the Meantime" (John Hiatt)
3. "The Devil's Real"
4. "No More Cane on the Brazos/Mail Order Mystics" (Smither, Traditional)
5. "No Reward"
6. "Already Gone (Flatfoot Blues)"
7. "Killing the Blues" (Rowland Salley)
8. "Rock and Roll Doctor" (Lowell George)
9. "Magnolia" (J. J. Cale)
10. "Honeysuckle Dog"
11. "Take it All"
12. "Time to Spend"

== Personnel ==
- Chris Smither – vocals, guitar, foot percussion
- Bill Urmson – bass
- Robin Batteau – violin
- Bill Brookheim – percussion
- Brad Hatfield – keyboards
- Bob Gay – saxophone
- Mark Egan – bass

== Production ==
- Produced and engineered by John Nagy
- Mastered by Toby Mountain
