= Up on the Lowdown =

1995 studio album by Chris Smither

Studio album by Chris Smither
- Released: 1995
- Recorded: December 1994
- Genre: Blues, folk
- Length: 40:41
- Label: HighTone
- Producer: Stephen Bruton

Chris Smither chronology
Happier Blue (1993)	Up on the Lowdown (1995)	Small Revelations (1997)

Up on the Lowdown is an album by the American musician Chris Smither, released in 1995. It was recorded at The Hit Shack, in Austin, Texas. "What Was It You Wanted" is a cover of the Bob Dylan song.

== Critical reception ==
Professional ratings
Review scores
Source	Rating
AllMusic	4.5/5 stars
The Sydney Morning Herald	3/5 stars

The St. Petersburg Times noted that "Smither's punchy guitar work plays host to a stripped-down backing of primarily bass, drums and keyboard." The Boston Globe wrote that "the roots-rocky texture suits his exquisitely rambunctious guitar and wise lyrics."

== Track listing ==
All songs by Chris Smither unless otherwise noted.

1. "Link of Chain" – 3:50
2. "'Deed I Do" – 3:38
3. "What Was It You Wanted" (Bob Dylan) – 5:16
4. "Up on the Lowdown" – 4:16
5. "Bittersweet" – 3:32
6. "Talk Memphis" (Jesse Winchester) – 3:09
7. "Can't Shake These Blues" (Steve Tilston) – 3:28
8. "I Am the Ride"– 3:51
9. "Time to Go Home" – 4:17
10. "Jailhouse Blues" (Traditional) – 5:24

== Personnel ==
- Chris Smither – vocals, guitar
- Chris Maresh – bass
- Mickey Raphael – harmonica
- Riley Osbourne – harmonica, keyboards
- Brannen Temple – drums, percussion

== Production ==
- Produced by Stephen Bruton
- Mastered by Jerry Tubb
