= Halloween II (2009 soundtrack) =

Film soundtrack and dialogue compilation

Halloween II (Original Motion Picture Soundtrack)

Soundtrack album by various artists
- Released: August 25, 2009
- Genre: Heavy metal
- Length: 45:48
- Label: Hip-O Records

Halloween II (Original Motion Picture Score)

Film score by Tyler Bates
- Released: August 25, 2009
- Genre: Film score
- Length: 50:41
- Label: Milan Records
- Producer: Tyler Bates

Tyler Bates chronology
Watchmen (2009)	Halloween II (2009)	The Haunted World of El Superbeasto (2009)

Two soundtracks were released for the 2009 slasher film Halloween II: an original soundtrack and an original score. The soundtrack album featured dialogues and songs, which were released by Hip-O Records on August 25, 2009. Tyler Bates original score was released on the same day through Milan Records.

== Development ==
For the sequel, Zombie only used Carpenter's original theme music in the final scene of the film, though the director admits that he and music composer Tyler Bates tried to find other places to include it. According to Zombie, Carpenter's music did not fit with what was happening in the film; whenever he or Bates would insert it into a scene it "just wouldn't feel right" to the director. Zombie also used popular culture songs throughout the film, with "Nights in White Satin" appearing the most prominently. Zombie chose songs that he liked, and that would enhance a given scene within the film. Nan Vernon, who recorded a new version of the song "Mr. Sandman" for the end credits of the 2007 remake, recorded a cover of "Love Hurts" for Halloween II.

== Release ==
An official soundtrack for the film was released on August 25, 2009. In addition, an album featuring the music of psychobilly band Captain Clegg and the Night Creatures was released in conjunction with Halloween II on August 28, 2009. Captain Clegg and the Night Creatures is a fictional band that appears in Halloween II. Tyler Bates' score was released in vinyl LPs in 2020.

== Reception ==
Jonathan Broxton of Movie Music UK panned the score, saying "it's an absolute wasteland, a complete abomination devoid of anything remotely resembling musical composition. It's like listening to the internal workings of a broken storage heater for an hour. I you value your sanity, I suggest giving this one a wide berth. I'm not kidding. The half star rating is simply to recognize that Bates didn't butcher Carpenter's theme beyond recognition." Jim Kaz of IGN wrote "While Zombie's forays into the Halloween film series have yielded mixed results, this latest soundtrack accompaniment does exactly what it's supposed to: raise the baby hairs on the back of your neck—and a little hell in your deck. And it does so with a creative mix of material that is anything but obvious." Rob Nelson of Variety wrote "Carpenter's classic synth score — chillingly deployed by Zombie throughout his previous entry — appears here only in the final minutes. Elsewhere on the soundtrack, the selection of 10cc's upbeat "The Things We Do for Love" is nothing if not ironic, particularly as Zombie's thing looks to have been done for other reasons."

== Track listing ==
=== Soundtrack album ===
No.	Title	Artist(s)	Length
1.	"He's F***ing Dead" (Dialogue)	Scout Taylor-Compton	0:12
2.	"Nights in White Satin"	The Moody Blues	4:25
3.	"Halloween Is Coming" (Dialogue)	Sheri Moon Zombie	0:21
4.	"The Things We Do for Love"	10cc	3:32
5.	"Who's Lee Marvin?" (Dialogue)	Brad Dourif	0:21
6.	"Amerarockers"	Scream	3:01
7.	"Jam & Jelly" (Dialogue)	Dayton Callie	0:15
8.	"Kick Out the Jams"	MC5	2:42
9.	"Ass Good" (Dialogue)	Daniel Roebuck	0:18
10.	"(I Know) I'm Losing You"	Rod Stewart	5:22
11.	"D-E-A-D" (Dialogue)	Malcolm McDowell	0:14
12.	"The Chase Is Better Than the Catch"	Motörhead	4:16
13.	"I'm Angel Myers" (Dialogue)	Scout Taylor-Compton	0:19
14.	"Therapy"	Tyler Bates	0:42
15.	"I Want to Party" (Dialogue)	Scout Taylor-Compton	0:21
16.	"Transylvania Terror Train"	Captain Clegg and the Night Creatures	2:27
17.	"Jack-O-Lantern and a Blonde" (Dialogue)	Jeff Phillips	0:29
18.	"Honky Tonk Halloween"	Captain Clegg and the Night Creatures	3:05
19.	"Bring Your Baby Back Home" (Dialogue)	Sheri Moon Zombie	0:12
20.	"I Just Want to Make Love to You"	Foghat	4:19
21.	"Snapped on by Weird Al" (Dialogue)	Chris Hardwick	0:20
22.	"Time to Die"	Void	1:36
23.	"I Love You Mommy" (Dialogue)	Scout Taylor-Compton	0:16
24.	"Love Hurts"	Nan Vernon	4:09
25.	"Nurse Killa"	Tyler Bates	2:34
Total length:			45:48

=== Score album ===
No.	Title	Length
1.	"Halloween Theme 2009"	3:04
2.	"I Killed A Man"	1:29
3.	"White Horse"	2:18
4.	"Stairs"	4:04
5.	"Love Shack"	3:09
6.	"I Won't Let You Down"	1:37
7.	"Killing Field"	2:35
8.	"I Found Boo"	2:31
9.	"Rabbit in Red"	7:30
10.	"Can I See the Pig?"	1:21
11.	"Van Kill"	1:17
12.	"Surveillance"	2:29
13.	"I'm Angel Myers"	1:39
14.	"Brackett Finds Annie"	5:21
15.	"We Are Family"	2:21
16.	"H1 Killing Spree"	7:56
Total length:		50:41

== Charts ==
Chart (2009)	Peak position
UK Soundtrack Albums (OCC)	33
US Soundtrack Albums (Billboard)	23
