= Honeysuckle Dog =

Studio album by Chris Smither
- Released: 2005
- Recorded: 1973
- Genre: Blues, folk
- Label: Okra-tone, Heavenly
- Producer: Michael Cuscuna

Chris Smither chronology
Train Home (2003)	Honeysuckle Dog (2005)	Leave the Light On (2006)

Honeysuckle Dog is an album by Chris Smither originally recorded in 1973 for United Artists Records but released in 2005. The album was not released until 2005 because the record label was purchased by Transamerica, which culled over half the UA roster of artists (including Smither) shortly before putting the label out of business altogether. Despite being dropped from the record label, Smither continued to tour, becoming a fixture in the New England folk clubs.

He would re-record a number of the songs for later albums on other labels.

Professional ratings
Review scores
Source	Rating
Tom Hull	B

== Track listing ==
All tracks composed by Chris Smither; except where indicated

1. "Sunshine Lady" (Paul MacNeil)
2. "Tribute to Mississippi John Hurt" (Hurt)
3. "Honeysuckle Dog"
4. "Rattlesnake Preacher" (Eric Von Schmidt)
5. "Rosalie"
6. "Guilty" (Randy Newman)
7. "It Ain't Easy" (Ron Davies)
8. "Lonely Time"
9. "Homunculus"
10. "Braden River"
11. "Steel Guitar" (Danny O'Keefe)
12. "Jailhouse Blues" (Traditional)

== Personnel ==
- Chris Smither – vocals, guitar
- Eric Kaz - piano, harmonica
- Dr. John - piano
- Lowell George - guitar
- David Holland - bass
- Patti Austin - background vocals
- Hilda Harris - background vocals
- Maretha Stewart - background vocals
- Robin Kenyatta - flute
- Jackie Lomax - bass
- Ray Lucas - drums
- Bill Payne - piano
- Pat Rebillot - piano, organ
- Perry Robinson - clarinet
- Mike Mainieri - vibraphone
- Chris Parker - drums
- Richard Anthony Davis - bass

== Production ==
- Produced by Michael Cuscuna
- Engineered by Mark Harmon, Nick Jameson, Harry Maslin
