= Live as I'll Ever Be =

Live As I'll Ever Be

Live album by Chris Smither
- Released: July 18, 2000
- Recorded: 1996–1999
- Genre: Blues, folk
- Label: HighTone

Chris Smither chronology
Drive You Home Again (1999)	Live As I'll Ever Be (2000)	Train Home (2003)

Live As I'll Ever Be is the title of a recording by American singer/songwriter Chris Smither. It is a live album recorded over the course of several years. The cover was painted by Eric Von Schmidt.

== Reception ==
Professional ratings
Review scores
Source	Rating
Allmusic	4/5 stars
PopMatters	(no rating)

Writing for Allmusic, critic Ann Wikstrom wrote of the album "There are entertaining song intros and bits of warm banter with the audience, too. Chris Smither is always at his best when he is performing live. In fact, he often says that he writes songs and records albums just so he can perform live, and not the other way around. Live As I'll Ever Be gives you a great front-row seat, any time you want it." Barbara Flaska of PopMatters wrote in her review "Smither is a guitarist, singer, and songwriter to be reckoned with. He sings in a beautifully timbered deep voice. His guitar work blends strong roots with his own innovative stylings."

== Track listing ==
All songs by Chris Smither unless otherwise noted.

1. "Intro" – :34
2. "Hold On" – 4:01
3. "The Devil's Real" – 4:57
4. "Link of Chain" – 4:48
5. "No Love Today intro" – 1:34
6. "No Love Today" – 4:42
7. "Caveman" – 5:21
8. "Winsome Smile" – 3:32
9. "Slow Surprise" – 3:40
10. "Help Me Now" – 3:34
11. "Small Revelations" – 4:06
12. "Can't Shake These Blues" (Smither, Steve Tilston) – 4:07
13. "Dust My Broom" – (Robert Johnson; arranged by Chris Smither) – 3:08
14. "I Am the Ride" – 3:57
15. "Up on the Lowdown" – 4:14
16. "Killing the Blues" (Rowland Salley) – 5:49

== Personnel ==
- Chris Smither – vocals, guitar
