= Don't It Drag On =

Studio album by Chris Smither
- Released: 1972
- Recorded: November 30 – December 4, 1971
- Studio: Bearsville Studios, Woodstock, New York
- Genre: Blues, folk
- Length: 34:56
- Label: Poppy, Tomato
- Producer: Michael Cuscuna

Chris Smither chronology
I'm a Stranger Too! (1970)	Don't It Drag On (1972)	It Ain't Easy (1984)

Don't It Drag On is an album by American singer/songwriter Chris Smither, released in 1972. It was re-released on CD along with I'm a Stranger Too! in 2002.

== Reception ==
Professional ratings
Review scores
Source	Rating
Allmusic	4/5 stars
Christgau's Record Guide	A−

Writing for Allmusic, critic Brett Hartenbach called Smither "a great writer who knows when to look elsewhere for material, a masterful guitarist who understands simplicity and a powerful singer with restraint.": and wrote of the album "while the bulk of Smither's material has a ruminative, melancholic tone, don't expect typical singer/songwriter fare." Village Voice critic Robert Christgau also praised the album, writing "Smither writes tough-minded yet numinous post-folk songs that do justice to his adventurous taste in other people's... A smart record."

== Track listing ==
All songs by Chris Smither unless otherwise noted.

1. "Lonesome Georgia Brown"
2. "Down in the Flood" (Bob Dylan)
3. "I've Got Mine"
4. "Statesboro Blues" (Blind Willie McTell)
5. "Another Way to Find You"
6. "No Expectations" (Mick Jagger, Keith Richards)
7. "Friend of the Devil" (John Dawson, Jerry Garcia, Robert Hunter)
8. "Don't It Drag On"
9. "Every Mother's Son"
10. "Mail Order Mystics"
11. "I Feel the Same"

== Personnel ==
- Chris Smither – vocals, guitar
- John Bailey – guitar, autoharp
- Rod Hicks – bass
- Happy Traum – banjo
- Bonnie Raitt – background vocals
- Maria Muldaur – background vocals
- Kathryn Rose – background vocals
- Roy Markowitz – drums
- Eric Kaz – piano
- Ben Keith – dobro, pedal steel guitar
- Stuart Schulman – violin

== Production ==
- Produced by Michael Cuscuna
- Engineered by Nick Jameson
- Milton Glaser – art direction, design
- Duane Michals – photography
- Bill Wasserzieher – reissue liner notes
