= Leave the Light On (Chris Smither album) =

Studio album by Chris Smither
- Released: September 19, 2006
- Genres: Blues, folk
- Label: Signature Sounds
- Producer: David Goodrich

Chris Smither chronology
Honeysuckle Dog (2005)	Leave the Light On (2006)	Time Stands Still (2009)

Leave the Light On is an album by American singer/songwriter Chris Smither, released in 2006. It was released on Mighty Albert, a new imprint established for him on Signature. Guest musicians on the record include Grammy Award-winner Tim O’Brien and members of Ollabelle.

The song, "Origin of Species" was named #42 on Rolling Stone Magazine's list of 100 Best Songs of the Year 2006.

== Reception ==
Professional ratings
Review scores
Source	Rating
Allmusic	4/5 stars
Robert Christgau	
Tom Hull	B+(***)
PopMatters	7/10 stars

Writing for Allmusic, critic Andy Whitman noted that there was no new ground covered by Smither but the album was still excellent. He wrote of the album "He's not flashy, but he plays exactly what fits each song... This very fine release is proof, if any is needed, that the light is still on, and shining very brightly." Music critic Robert Christgau gave the album a two-star honorable mention.

Steve Horowitz of PopMatters gave the album a 7 of 10-star rating, writing "Smither mines this territory again with much success on his latest album, Leave the Light On. The eight original tunes and four covers span a wide range of topics and moods... The notion of finite time casts a shadow over all of these songs, in the sense that this is the only world we have, the only life we lead, the only love we’ll know, etc. Let’s make our time on this planet count, not in the grand sense of destiny or history, but in terms of personal satisfaction... While Smither’s lyrics and vocal delivery are in the forefront of the production, his excellent acoustic guitar playing should be noted. Producer David Goodrich keeps the strings sounding clear and bright. His songs, his singing, and his playing make this a wonderful acoustic folk and blues album."

== Track listing ==
All songs by Chris Smither unless otherwise noted.

1. "Open Up" - 2:55
2. "Leave the Light On" - 3:47
3. "Shillin' for the Blues" - 4:33
4. "Seems So Real" - 4:26
5. "Origin of Species" - 3:05
6. "Cold Trail Blues" (Peter Case) - 4:29
7. "Diplomacy" - 2:27
8. "Father's Day" - 4:39
9. "Visions of Johanna" (Bob Dylan) - 5:22
10. "Blues in the Bottle" (Public Domain) - 3:29
11. "John Hardy" (Traditional) - 3:12
12. "John Hardy (Reprise)" (Traditional) - 1:32

== Personnel ==
- Chris Smither – vocals, guitar
- David Goodrich – guitar, kalimba, piano, bass
- Tim O'Brien – mandolin, mandocello, fiddle, background vocals
- Mike Piehl – drums
- Lou Ulrich – bass
- Sean Staples – background vocals
- Anita Suhanin – background vocals
- Ollabelle – background vocals
- Jazer Giles – accordion, piano

== Production ==
- Produced by David Goodrich
- Mixed by Mark Thayer and David Goodrich
- Mastered by Bob St. John
- Project coordination by Carol Young
- Art Direction & Design by Meghan Dewar
- Photography by Liz Linder and Morguefille
