= Riverside Battle Songs =

Studio album by Ollabelle
- Released: August 1, 2006
- Genre: Folk, Gospel, Country, Bluegrass
- Label: Verve Forecast
- Producer: Larry Campbell

Ollabelle chronology
| Ollabelle (2004) | Riverside Battle Songs (2006) |

Professional ratings
Review scores
| Source | Rating |
|---|---|
| George Graham | (Positive) |
| Allmusic | 3.5/5 stars |

Riverside Battle Songs is a 2006 album by Ollabelle. It was produced by Larry Campbell, best known for having played in Bob Dylan's band.

== Track listing ==
1. "See Line Woman"
2. "High On A Mountain"
3. "Heaven's Pearls"
4. "Fall Back"
5. "Dream The Fall"
6. "Blue Northern Lights"
7. "Reach For Love"
8. "Troubles Of The World"
9. "Riverside"
10. "Northern Star"
11. "Gone Today"
12. "Everything Is Broken"
13. "Last Lullaby"
