= Small Revelations =

Studio album by Chris Smither
- Released: January 14, 1997
- Recorded: September 14–28, 1996
- Genres: Blues, folk
- Length: 35:30
- Label: HighTone
- Producer: Stephen Bruton

Chris Smither chronology
| Up on the Lowdown (1995) | Small Revelations (1997) | Drive You Home Again (1999) |

Small Revelations is an album by the American singer/songwriter Chris Smither, released in 1997. Emmylou Harris recorded “Slow Surprise” for the Horse Whisperer soundtrack CD.

== Reception ==
Professional ratings
Review scores
| Source | Rating |
|---|---|
| AllMusic | 3/5 stars |
| Robert Christgau | |

Music critic Robert Christgau gave the album a three-star honorable mention, commenting: "blues his religion, his therapy, his metier."

== Track listing ==
All songs by Chris Smither unless otherwise noted.

1. "Thanks to You" (Jesse Winchester) – 2:43
2. "Slow Surprise" – 2:46
3. "Hold On" – 4:02
4. "Caveman" – 4:36
5. "Help Me Now" – 3:23
6. "Small Revelations" – 4:00
7. "Winsome Smile" – 3:44
8. "Dust My Broom"– 3:09
9. "Sportin' Life" (R. Johnson) – 3:07
10. "Hook, Line and Sinker" – 4:00

== Personnel ==
- Chris Smither – vocals, guitar
