= Drive You Home Again =

Studio album by Chris Smither
- Released: May 16, 1999
- Recorded: December 2–17, 1998
- Genre: Blues, folk
- Length: 46:17
- Label: HighTone
- Producer: Stephen Bruton

Chris Smither chronology
Small Revelations (1997)	Drive You Home Again (1999)	Live as I'll Ever Be (2000)

Drive You Home Again is an album by American singer/songwriter Chris Smither, released in 1999.

== Reception ==
Professional ratings
Review scores
Source	Rating
Allmusic	4/5 stars
Robert Christgau	A−
Tom Hull	B
Rolling Stone	4/5 stars

Writing for Allmusic, critic Jeff Burger wrote of the album "Smither's gravelly, instantly recognizable voice is a perfect fit for his pensive, sharply honed lyrics and his blues and folk-based music... Like Nick Drake and the Van Morrison of Astral Weeks days, Smither makes you feel as if you're in a dream. You may not want to wake up for a while." Music critic Robert Christgau wrote "...you'd never suspect he was a moral philosopher. But in fact he is that even rarer thing, a moral philosopher with good values, and here his songwriting takes over a career marked by killer covers... he thinks on his butt while keeping the beat with his foot. He's worth attending even if you think blues are history."

== Track listing ==
All songs by Chris Smither unless otherwise noted.

1. "Drive You Home Again" – 5:28
2. "Tell Me Why You Love Me" – 3:55
3. "No Love Today" – 4:57
4. "Hey, Hey, Hey" – 4:04
5. "Get a Better One" – 5:22
6. "Hold On II " – 3:24
7. "So Long" – 4:48
8. "Duncan & Brady" (Traditional)– 3:52
9. "Steel Guitar" (Danny O'Keefe) – 3:38
10. "Don't Make Promises" (Tim Hardin) – 3:25
11. "Rattlesnake Preacher" (Eric Von Schmidt) – 3:24

== Personnel ==
- Chris Smither – vocals, guitar
- Joel Jose Guzman – accordion, keyboards, melodica
- John Mills – saxophone
- Marty Muse – pedal steel guitar
- Chris Maresh – bass
- Mickey Raphael – harmonica
- Raul Rodriguez – tuba
- Brannen Temple – drums, percussion
- Malford Milligan – background vocals

== Production ==
- Produced by Stephen Bruton
- Mixed by Chet Himes
- Engineered by Jay Hudson
- Mastered by Jerry Tubb
