= Another Way to Find You =

Live album by Chris Smither
- Released: 1991
- Recorded: December 28–29, 1989 live in the studio at Soundtorack Studios, Boston
- Genre: Blues, folk
- Length: 56:02
- Label: Flying Fish, HighTone

Chris Smither chronology
It Ain't Easy (1984)	Another Way to Find You (1991)	Happier Blue (1993)

Another Way to Find You is a live studio album by American singer/songwriter Chris Smither, released in 1991. It was recorded in the studio in front of a live audience.

== Reception ==
Professional ratings
Review scores
Source	Rating
Allmusic	4.5/5 stars
Robert Christgau	A−
Tom Hull	B

Writing for Allmusic, critic Cub Koda wrote of the album "His guitar work is clean and well played, and his vocals attain a sense of engagement throughout. While his interpretations of tunes by Chuck Berry, Randy Newman, Elizabeth Cotton, Blind Willie McTell, Jimmy Reed and others are fine, the true highlights come with the originals..." Music critic Robert Christgau wrote of the album "Smither is an easy taste to acquire: he strums as if to the second line born, sings in a lazy, roughly luxuriant baritone, writes when he's got something to say, and understands o.p.'s from the inside out."

== Track listing ==
All songs by Chris Smither unless otherwise noted.

1. "High Heel Sneakers/Big Boss Man" (Tommy Tucker/Luther Dixon, Al Smith)
2. "Another Way to Find You"
3. "Down in the Flood" (Bob Dylan)
4. "Lonely Time"
5. "Lonesome Georgia Brown"
6. "Statesboro Blues" (Blind Willie McTell)
7. "Catfish" (Danny O'Keefe)
8. "Every Mother's Son"
9. "I Got Mine"
10. "Don't It Drag On"
11. "Love You Like a Man"
12. "I Feel the Same"
13. "Friend of the Devil" (Jerry Garcia, Robert Hunter)
14. "Shake Sugaree" (Elizabeth Cotten)
15. "Tulane" (Chuck Berry)
16. "Have You See My Baby?" (Randy Newman)
17. "A Song for Susan"
18. "Homunculus"

== Personnel ==
- Chris Smither – vocals, guitar
