= Desolation Row =

1965 song written and sung by Bob Dylan

Song by Bob Dylan

from the album Highway 61 Revisited
- Released: August 30, 1965
- Recorded: August 4, 1965
- Studio: Columbia, New York City
- Genre: Folk rock
- Length: 11:21
- Label: Columbia
- Songwriter: Bob Dylan
- Producer: Bob Johnston

"Desolation Row" is a song by the American singer-songwriter Bob Dylan. It was recorded on August 4, 1965, and released as the closing track of Dylan's sixth studio album, Highway 61 Revisited. The song has been noted for its length (11:21) and surreal lyrics in which Dylan weaves characters into a series of vignettes that suggest entropy and urban chaos.

== Recording ==
Although the album version of "Desolation Row" is acoustic, the song was initially recorded in an electric version. The first take was recorded during an evening session on July 29, 1965, with Harvey Brooks on electric bass and Al Kooper on electric guitar. This version was eventually released in 2005 on The Bootleg Series Vol. 7: No Direction Home: The Soundtrack.

On August 2, Dylan recorded five further takes of "Desolation Row". The Highway 61 Revisited version was recorded at an overdub session on August 4, 1965, in Columbia's Studio A in New York City. Nashville-based guitarist Charlie McCoy, who happened to be in New York, was invited by producer Bob Johnston to contribute an improvised acoustic guitar part and Russ Savakus played bass guitar. Author Mark Polizzotti credits some of the success of the song to McCoy's contribution: "While Dylan's panoramic lyrics and hypnotic melody sketch out the vast canvas, it is McCoy's fills that give it their shading." Outtakes from the August sessions were released on The Bootleg Series Vol. 12: The Cutting Edge 1965–1966 in 2015.

== Interpretation ==
When asked where "Desolation Row" was located, at a TV press conference in San Francisco on December 3, 1965, Dylan replied: "Oh, that's some place in Mexico, it's across the border. It's noted for its Coke factory." Al Kooper, who played electric guitar on the first recordings of "Desolation Row", suggested that it was located on a stretch of Eighth Avenue, Manhattan, "an area infested with whore houses, sleazy bars and porno supermarkets totally beyond renovation or redemption". Polizzotti suggests that both the inspiration and title of the song may have come from Desolation Angels by Jack Kerouac and Cannery Row by John Steinbeck.

When Jann Wenner asked Dylan in 1969 whether Allen Ginsberg had influenced his songs, Dylan replied: "I think he did at a certain period. That period of... 'Desolation Row,' that kind of New York type period, when all the songs were just city songs. His poetry is city poetry. Sounds like the city."

The southwestern flavored acoustic guitar backing and eclecticism of the imagery led Polizzotti to describe "Desolation Row" as the "ultimate cowboy song, the 'Home On The Range' of the frightening territory that was mid-sixties America". In the penultimate verse the passengers on the Titanic are "shouting 'Which Side Are You On?'", a slogan of left-wing politics, so, for Robert Shelton, one of the targets of this song is "simpleminded political commitment. What difference which side you're on if you're sailing on the Titanic?" In an interview with USA Today on September 10, 2001, the day before the release of his album Love and Theft, Dylan claimed that the song is "a minstrel song through and through. I saw some ragtag minstrel show in blackface at the carnivals when I was growing up, and it had an effect on me, just as much as seeing the lady with four legs."

The song opens with a report that "they're selling postcards of the hanging", and notes "the circus is in town". Polizzotti, and other critics, have connected this song with the lynching of three black men in Duluth. The men were employed by a traveling circus and had been accused of raping a white woman. On the night of June 15, 1920, they were removed from custody and hanged on the corner of First Street and Second Avenue East. Photo postcards of the lynchings were sold. Duluth was Bob Dylan's birthplace. Dylan's father, Abram Zimmerman, was eight years old at the time of the lynchings, and lived two blocks from the scene. Abram Zimmerman passed the story on to his son. (Note: In The Bootleg Series Volume 7 recording, Dylan changes the lyric "On her 22nd birthday she already is an old maid" to "On her twentieth birthday she was already an old maid." Irene Tusken, the supposed victim of the alleged rape that was the catalyst for the Duluth Lynchings was 19 years old at the time. (Fedo, Michael (2000). The Lynchings in Duluth. St. Paul, MN: Minnesota Historical Society Press))

== Reception and legacy ==
"Desolation Row" has been described as Dylan's most ambitious work up to that date. In the New Oxford Companion to Music, Gammond described "Desolation Row" as an example of Dylan's work that achieved a "high level of poetical lyricism." Clinton Heylin notes that Dylan is writing a song as long as traditional folk ballads, such as "Tam Lin" and "Matty Groves", and in that classic ballad metre, but without any linear narrative thread.

When he reviewed the Highway 61 Revisited album for The Daily Telegraph in 1965, the English poet Philip Larkin described the song as a "marathon", with an "enchanting tune and mysterious, possibly half-baked words". For Andy Gill the song is "an 11-minute epic of entropy, which takes the form of a Felliniesque parade of grotesques and oddities featuring a huge cast of iconic characters, some historical (Albert Einstein, Nero), some biblical (Noah, Cain and Abel), some fictional (Ophelia, Romeo, Cinderella), some literary (T. S. Eliot and Ezra Pound), and some who fit into none of the above categories, notably Dr. Filth and his dubious nurse."

According to the music historian Nicholas Schaffner, "Desolation Row" was the longest popular music track, until the Rolling Stones released "Goin' Home" (11:35) in 1966.

In 2010, Rolling Stone ranked "Desolation Row" at number 187 on their "500 Greatest Songs of All Time" list; the song was re-ranked at number 83 in the 2021 revision of the list. In 2020, The Guardian and GQ ranked the song number five and number three, respectively, on their lists of the 50 greatest Bob Dylan songs.

Dylan played the Isle of Wight Festival 1969, and "Desolation Row" was the name given to the hillside area used by the 600,000 ticketless fans at the 1970 event, before the fence was torn down.

== Live performance ==
Dylan debuted "Desolation Row" at Forest Hills Tennis Stadium in Queens, New York, on August 28, 1965, after he "controversially went electric" at the 1965 Newport Folk Festival. It was part of the acoustic set Dylan played before bringing on his electric band. Of the performance, music critic Robert Shelton described it as "A major new work ... filled with the incongruities of black humor and macabre imagery... another of Mr. Dylan's musical Rorschachs capable of widely varied interpretation ... It can best be characterized as a 'folk song of the absurd.'" The displaced images and Kafkaesque cavalcade of historical characters were at first greeted with laughter.

Live versions are included on Dylan's albums MTV Unplugged (1995; recorded November 1994), The Bootleg Series Vol. 4: Bob Dylan Live 1966, The "Royal Albert Hall" Concert (1998; recorded May 1966), The 1966 Live Recordings (2016 boxed set; multiple recording dates, with one concert released separately on the album The Real Royal Albert Hall 1966 Concert), and Live 1962–1966: Rare Performances From The Copyright Collections (2018; recorded April 1966). The song has been featured in live performances as recently as November 19, 2012 and was played in Bournemouth on May 4, 2017. Dylan once again performed the song at the Outlaw Music Festival Tour in 2024, a performance that gained media notice for his use of a small wrench, which he rhythmically tapped on the side of his microphone.

== Other renditions ==
=== My Chemical Romance ===
"Desolation Row"

Single by My Chemical Romance

from the album Watchmen: Music from the Motion Picture
- Released: January 26, 2009
- Recorded: October 2008
- Studio: Electric Lady Studios (New York City)
- Genre: Punk rock; pop-punk
- Length: 3:00
- Label: Reprise; Warner Sunset
- Songwriter: Bob Dylan
- Producer: My Chemical Romance

My Chemical Romance singles chronology
"Teenagers" (2007)	"Desolation Row" (2009)	"Na Na Na (Na Na Na Na Na Na Na Na Na)" (2010)

Music video
- "Desolation Row" on YouTube

The American rock band My Chemical Romance recorded a cover of "Desolation Row" for the 2009 soundtrack of the film Watchmen. A pop-punk and punk rock song, it was recorded in October 2008 at Electric Lady Studios, with producer Rich Costey. The first chapter of the comic on which the film is based ("At Midnight All the Agents") takes its name from a line in the song. This line is also quoted at the end of the chapter.

"Desolation Row" was released as a single on January 26, 2009, with an accompanying music video later being released on January 30. The song's music video, directed by Zack Snyder features the band performing in a theatre, with several shots cutting between the riot of people. It charted in multiple countries, reaching number 1 on the UK Rock & Metal Singles chart and number 7 on the Bubbling Under Hot 100 chart. On October 11, 2022, it was performed during the band's 2019-2023 reunion tour.

==== Background and composition ====
My Chemical Romance released their third studio album, The Black Parade, on October 23, 2006, through Reprise Records. A concept album, it centers around a man dying from cancer, known as "the Patient", who reflects upon his life as he nears his death, which is presented to him in the form of his fondest childhood memory: seeing a marching band. This also led to the creation of an alter-ego band named after the album, simply titled "The Black Parade". To promote the album, My Chemical Romance would perform around 60 standalone shows throughout 2006.

During this time, director Zack Snyder approached frontman Gerard Way to discuss recording "Desolation Row" for Snyder's upcoming film adaptation of the comic series Watchmen. Way agreed, and soon him and Snyder started the discussion of the recording process. Snyder initially wanted the band to cover the full song, however Way realized with the ten-minute runtime, the song would have to be split in order make way for a tighter, more "punkier" tune that could maintain that high energy. Way stated "I sat in a hotel and did a rough arrangement, which clocked in at around 2:40, and I paid careful attention to the lyrics, while losing some of my favorite verses I managed to keep the ones I felt were represented by Alan Moore in the comic."

"Desolation Row" is a pop-punk and punk rock song, with a length of three minutes. Chloe Spinks of Gigwise characterized the song as "A wall of sound emanating from a dive bar, warning you about the riotous Desolation Row". The song has been compared to the works of the Sex Pistols, the Ramones, Iggy Pop, and the Dead Kennedys. Additionally, it contains a guitar solo played by Ray Toro.

==== Release ====
Watchmen: Music from the Motion Picture was released on March 3, 2009. "Desolation Row" is the first song on the soundtrack. The song was released as the only single from the soundtrack prior to its release on January 26. The music video for the single was directed by Snyder, and was released on January 30, in which the band is depicted performing in a theatre, before police storm the building, with additional footage cutting between rioting crowds and people getting arrested. "Desolation Row" was released on 12 inch vinyl record on February 9, limited to 3,000 copies. A live performance of the song was included on the Bob Dylan charity album, Chimes of Freedom, released in 2012. My Chemical Romance also performed "Desolation Row" live on various occasions, including during the album release party for Danger Days: The True Lives of the Fabulous Killjoys (2010), the World Contamination Tour (2010-2012), and on October 11, 2022, where they played the song live for the first time since 2011 as part of the band's 2019-2023 reunion tour.

==== Commercial performance ====
In the United States, "Desolation Row" reached number 7 on the Bubbling Under Hot 100 chart the week of February 14, 2009, and went on to peak at number 20 on the Alternative Airplay chart. Outside of the US, the single went on to peak at number 47 and 69 on both the Digital Song Sales chart and the Canada Rock chart respectively. The single debuted in the United Kingdom and topped the UK Rock & Metal Singles chart, additionally peaking at number 52 on the UK Singles chart. On individual national charts, it reached number 52 on the Japan Hot 100 chart, number 22 on the Mexico Ingles Airplay chart, and number 18 on the Scotland Singles chart.

==== Charts ====
Chart performance for "Desolation Row"
Chart (2009)	Peak position
Canada Digital Song Sales (Billboard)	69
Canada Rock (Billboard)	47
Japan Hot 100 (Billboard)	52
Mexico Ingles Airplay (Billboard)	22
Scottish Singles Sales (Official Charts)	18
UK Singles (Official Charts)	52
UK Rock & Metal (Official Charts)	1
US Alternative Airplay (Billboard)	20
US Bubbling Under Hot 100 (Billboard)	7
US Hot Singles Sales (Billboard)	2

=== Other cover versions ===
The Grateful Dead performed a version of "Desolation Row" from the mid-1980s onwards. The song is included on their 2002 release Postcards of the Hanging, the album name alluding to the lyrics of "Desolation Row". The album features a recording from March 24, 1990, at the Knickerbocker Arena in Albany, New York. The song was frequently abbreviated in Dead set lists to "D-Row."

Chris Smither recorded the song on his 2003 album Train Home with Bonnie Raitt providing backup on vocals and slide guitar. It has also been recorded by Robyn Hitchcock on the album Robyn Sings.

Old 97's singer Rhett Miller borrowed "Desolation Row"'s melody for a new song, "Champaign, Illinois". It was recorded with Dylan's blessing and appears on Old 97's 2010 album The Grande Theatre, Volume One, with Dylan and Miller sharing writing credit.

Italian singer-songwriters Fabrizio de André and Francesco De Gregori wrote "Via della Povertà", an Italian translation of "Desolation Row", and included it on 1974 album Canzoni.

== In popular culture ==
Laura Branigan's 1985 single "Spanish Eddie" mentions the song in its chorus, "The night Spanish Eddie cashed it in / they were playin' "Desolation Row" on the radio"

A line from the song "At midnight, all the agents and the superhuman crew, go out and round up everyone that knows more than they do." is the closing quotation in chapter 1 of "Watchmen" by Alan Moore and Dave Gibbons. In a foreword for the collected editions of the series, Dave Gibbons claims "it began with Bob Dylan", that the lyrics reproduced for chapter 1 were the "spark that would one day ignite WATCHMEN."

The same line is evoked in Bruce Springsteen's 4th of July, Asbury Park as follows: "Did you hear the cops finally busted Madame Marie, for telling fortunes better than they do".

The title track of The War on Drugs' fifth album I Don't Live Here Anymore contains the lyrics, "Like when we went to see Bob Dylan/ We danced to "Desolation Row"".

In the sixth part of Jojo's Bizarre Adventure, "Desolation Road" is one of the 14 phrases that are uttered by antagonist Enrico Pucci in order to activate the Green Baby and acquire the Stand C-Moon.
