= I'm a Stranger Too! =

Studio album by Chris Smither
- Released: 1970
- Genre: Blues, folk
- Length: 36:13
- Label: Poppy, Tomato
- Producer: Michael Cuscuna, Ron Frangipane

Chris Smither chronology
I'm a Stranger Too! (1970)	Don't It Drag On (1972)

Alternative Cover
- Re-issue CD cover of I'm a Stranger Too! and Don't It Drag On

I'm a Stranger Too! is the title of the debut recording of Chris Smither. It was re-released on CD along with Don't It Drag On in 2002. Bonnie Raitt covered "Love (Me) Like a Man" on her second album Give It Up.

Professional ratings
Review scores
Source	Rating
Allmusic	3/5 stars

== Track listing ==
All songs by Chris Smither unless otherwise noted.

1. "A Short While Ago"
2. "A Song for Susan"
3. "I Am a Child" (Neil Young)
4. "Have You Seen My Baby?" (Randy Newman)
5. "Devil Got Your Woman"
6. "Homunculus"
7. "Love You Like a Man"
8. "Lonely Time"
9. "Look Down the Road"
10. "Old Kentucky Home (Turpentine and Dandelion Wine)" (Randy Newman)
11. "Time to Go Home"

== Personnel ==
- Chris Smither – vocals, acoustic guitar, arrangements
- John Bailey – acoustic and rhythm guitar, background vocals, arrangements
- Richard Davis – electric bass
- Russell George – acoustic bass, fiddle
- Al Rogers – drums, tambourine

== Production ==
- Produced by Michael Cuscuna and Ron Frangipane
- Engineered by Jay Tropp & Brooks Arthur
- Milton Glaser – graphic design
- Jim Bogin – photography
