= Train Home =

Studio album by Chris Smither
- Released: July 8, 2003
- Genres: Blues, folk
- Label: HighTone
- Producer: David Goodrich

Chris Smither chronology
| Live as I'll Ever Be (2000) | Train Home (2003) | Honeysuckle Dog (2005) |

Train Home is an album by American singer/songwriter Chris Smither, released in 2003. Guest Bonnie Raitt provides slide guitar and backup vocals on "Desolation Row".

== Reception ==
Professional ratings
Review scores
| Source | Rating |
|---|---|
| Allmusic | 3/5 stars |
| Robert Christgau | |

Writing for Allmusic, critic Hal Horowitz called the release "a quiet gem" and wrote of the album "Chris Smither settles into his distinctive combination of folk and blues with this excellent release. Although not pushing established boundaries, his rich, velvety voice and mature spoken-sung vocals convey a sense of truth and add depth to these introspective compositions." Music critic Robert Christgau gave the album a choice cut for "Let It Go".

== Track listing ==
All songs by Chris Smither unless otherwise noted.

1. "Train Home" – 4:12
2. "Outside In" – 4:11
3. "Confirmation" – 4:05
4. "Crocodile Man" (Dave Carter) – 3:33
5. "Lola" – 3:27
6. "Desolation Row" (Bob Dylan) – 7:45
7. "Call Time" – 3:35
8. "Candy Man" (Mississippi John Hurt) – 3:37
9. "Never Needed It More" – 3:17
10. "Let It Go" – 4:33
11. "Kind Woman" (Richie Furay) – 3:50

== Personnel ==
- Chris Smither – vocals, guitar
- David "Goody" Goodrich – guitar, banjo, bass, mandolin, piano, slide guitar, reed organ
- Richard Downs – horn
- Mike Piehl – drums
- Bonnie Raitt – background vocals, slide guitar
- Louise Ulrich – bass
- Anita Suhanin – background vocals

== Production ==
- Produced by David "Goody" Goodrich
- Mastered by Bob St. John
- Engineered and mixed by Mark Thayer
- Design by Jason Kruppa
- Photography by Thomas Petillo & Abigail Seymour

== See also ==
- List of train songs
