= Masked & Anonymous (soundtrack) =

Masked & Anonymous: Music From The Motion Picture

Soundtrack album by Various artists
- Released: July 15, 2003
- Label: Sony Music

Masked & Anonymous: Music from the Motion Picture is a 2003 soundtrack album by various artists performing songs by Bob Dylan, apart from Bob Dylan himself, who performs not only his own, but also some classic folk songs.

== Track listing ==
All songs by Bob Dylan, except where noted:

1. "My Back Pages" - The Magokoro Brothers
2. "Gotta Serve Somebody" - Shirley Caesar
3. "Down in the Flood" - Bob Dylan
4. "It's All Over Now, Baby Blue" - The Grateful Dead
5. "Most of the Time" - Sophie Zelmani
6. "On a Night Like This" - Los Lobos
7. "Diamond Joe" - Bob Dylan (Jack Elliot)
8. "Come Una Pietra Scalciata" (Like a Rolling Stone) - Articolo 31
9. "One More Cup of Coffee" - Sertab
10. "Non Dirle Che Non E' Cosi'" (If You See Her, Say Hello) - Francesco de Gregori
11. "Dixie" - Bob Dylan (Dan Emmett)
12. "Señor (Tales of Yankee Power)" - Jerry Garcia
13. "Cold Irons Bound" - Bob Dylan
14. "City of Gold" - The Dixie Hummingbirds

== Chart performance ==
Chart (2003)	Peak position
Norwegian Albums (VG-lista)	21
UK Soundtrack Albums (OCC)	8
