= Time Stands Still (Chris Smither album) =

Studio album by Chris Smither
- Released: September 29, 2009
- Genre: Blues, folk
- Length: 44:18
- Label: Signature Sounds
- Producer: David Goodrich

Chris Smither chronology
Leave the Light On (2006)	Time Stands Still (2009)	Lost and Found (2011)

Time Stands Still is an album of blues and folk music by American singer/songwriter Chris Smither, released in 2009. It was released on Signature Sound Recordings and produced by David Goodrich.

== Reception ==
Professional ratings
Review scores
Source	Rating
Allmusic	4.5/5 stars
Tom Hull	B+ (***)

Writing for Allmusic, critic Michael G. Nastos praised the album, writing

Chris Smither has never sounded better, especially on his lean-sounding guitar. He's more grounded, down to earth, and authentic in his attempt to keep his music very alive and well in troubled times... Of his many great recordings over the years, Time Stands Still might very well be Chris Smither's magnum opus, a triumph over tragedy and tough times that should provide valuable lessons to anyone who has felt abject pain caused by family losses, the grind-to-a-halt recession, unemployment, and that helpless, depressed feeling everyone has experienced. It is uplifting—a recording that you will relate to upon listening to for only a few minutes, but which you will savor all the way through.

== Track listing ==
All songs by Chris Smither unless otherwise noted.

1. "Don't Call Me Stranger" - 4:08
2. "Time Stands Still" - 3:45
3. "Surprise, Surprise" - 4:08
4. "I Don't Know" - 4:04
5. "Call Yourself" - 4:43
6. "Old Man Down" - 5:00
7. "I Told You So" - 3:46
8. "It Takes a Lot to Laugh, It Takes a Train to Cry" (Bob Dylan) - 4:26
9. "Miner's Blues" (Frank Hutchinson) - 3:08
10. "Someone Like Me" - 4:25
11. "Madame Geneva's" (Mark Knopfler) - 2:51

== Personnel ==
- Chris Smither – vocals, acoustic guitar
- David Goodrich – electric and acoustic guitar, piano
- Zak Trojano – percussion

== Production ==
- Produced by David Goodrich
- Mixed by Mark Thayer and David Goodrich
- Mastered by Ian Kennedy
- Project coordination by Carol Young
- Design by Meghan Dewar
- Photography by Jeff Fasano
