= It Ain't Easy (Chris Smither album) =

Studio album by Chris Smither
- Released: 1984
- Recorded: 1984
- Genres: Blues, folk
- Length: 56:02
- Label: Adelphi

Chris Smither chronology
Don't It Drag On (1972)	It Ain't Easy (1984)	Another Way to Find You (1991)

It Ain't Easy is an album by American singer/songwriter Chris Smither, released in 1984. The original contained 12 songs.

== Reception ==
Professional ratings
Review scores
Source	Rating
Allmusic	4/5 stars
Robert Christgau	(B+)

Writing for Allmusic, critic Brett Hartenbach wrote of the album "Smither never treats the songs as if they were museum pieces... There's not a false moment on the entire record. Highly recommended." Music critic Robert Christgau wrote of the album "...it's damn hard to make a consistently interesting album out of your voice and an acoustic guitar. Smither comes within a dud original and a few extraneous covers of bring it off..."

== Track listing ==
All tracks composed by Chris Smither; except where indicated

1. "Footloose"
2. "It Ain't Easy" (Ron Davies)
3. "John Hurt Medley" (Mississippi John Hurt)
4. "No Money Down" (Chuck Berry)
5. "Green Rocky Road" (Len Chandler, Robert Kaufman)
6. "Guilty" (Randy Newman)
7. "Maybellene" (Chuck Berry)
8. "Rosalie"
9. "One Plus One"
10. "Ninety Nine Year Blues" (Julius Daniels)
11. "The Glory of Love" (Billy Hill)
12. "Sitting on Top of the World" (Lonnie Chatmon, Walter Vinson)
13. "Once in a Very Blue Moon" (Patrick Alger, Eugene Levine)
14. "So Long, Harry Truman" (Danny O'Keefe)

== Personnel ==
- Chris Smither – vocals, guitar
