= Watchmen: Original Motion Picture Score =

Film score by Tyler Bates
- Released: March 3, 2009
- Genre: Film score
- Length: 44:43
- Label: Warner Bros. Records
- Producer: Tyler Bates

Tyler Bates chronology
The Day the Earth Stood Still (Original Motion Picture Soundtrack) (2008)	Watchmen: Original Motion Picture Score (2009)	Halloween II (Original Motion Picture Soundtrack) (2009)

Professional ratings
Review scores
Source	Rating
Empire	2/5 stars
IGN	8.5/10 stars
Allmusic	3.5/5 stars

Watchmen: Original Motion Picture Score is a film score album for the 2009 film Watchmen composed by Tyler Bates and performed by the Hollywood Studio Symphony. It was released concurrently with the soundtrack album Watchmen: Music from the Motion Picture.

The album's digital release comes with a bonus track, "Prison Fight (Philip Steir / Phat Prison Phight Remix)", at the end of the album.

== Track listing ==
All tracks are written by Tyler Bates, except where stated.

No.	Title	Length
1.	"Rescue Mission"	2:14
2.	"Don't Get Too Misty Eyed"	1:37
3.	"Tonight the Comedian Died"	2:44
4.	"Silk Spectre"	1:01
5.	"We'll Live Longer"	0:57
6.	"You Quit!"	0:39
7.	"Only Two Names Remain"	1:43
8.	"The American Dream"	1:57
9.	"Edward Blake – The Comedian"	2:42
10.	"The Last Laugh"	0:58
11.	"Prison Fight"	1:45
12.	"Just Look Around You"	5:52
13.	"Dan's Apocalyptic Dream"	1:18
14.	"Who Murdered Hollis Mason?"	0:56
15.	"What About Janey Slater?"	1:35
16.	"I'll Tell You About Rorschach"	4:10
17.	"Countdown"	2:47
18.	"It Was Me"	1:26
19.	"All That Is Good"	4:59
20.	"Requiem" (Excerpted from Mozart's "Requiem")	0:55
21.	"I Love You"	6:02
22.	"Prison Fight (Philip Steir / Phat Prison Phight Remix)"
Total length:		44:43

== See also ==
- Watchmen: Music from the Motion Picture
