= Watchmen: Music from the Motion Picture =

Soundtrack album by Various artists
- Released: March 3, 2009
- Genre: Rock; pop; soul; folk; soundtrack
- Length: 51:13
- Label: Reprise
- Producer: Various artists

Singles from Watchmen: Music from the Motion Picture
- 1. "Desolation Row" Released: January 26, 2009

Professional ratings
Review scores
Source	Rating
Empire	4/5 stars

Watchmen: Music from the Motion Picture is the film soundtrack album for the 2009 film Watchmen. The soundtrack features three songs written by Bob Dylan: "Desolation Row", "The Times They Are a-Changin'", and "All Along the Watchtower".

The film uses some of the songs mentioned in the comic, including "The Times They Are a-Changin'", Jimi Hendrix's cover of "All Along the Watchtower"; Simon and Garfunkel's "The Sounds of Silence"; Nena's "99 Luftballons"; a muzak version of Tears For Fears' "Everybody Wants to Rule the World"; and Nat King Cole's "Unforgettable". Many of the period songs were up-mixed to 5.1 surround for the film using the Penteo process. Tyler Bates, who wrote the film's original score, said the challenge was composing music that would transition effectively into these famous songs. Director Zack Snyder and Bates received Dylan's permission to use the stems from "The Times They Are a-Changin'" so the three-minute song could play over the six-minute opening. The story of how Dr. Manhattan came to be is accompanied by a montage of the pieces "Prophecies" and "Pruit Igoe" by Philip Glass, originally composed for the 1982 cult film Koyaanisqatsi. Nite Owl II and Silk Spectre II's sex scene aboard the Owl Ship is set to the tune of Leonard Cohen's "Hallelujah". Originally Zack Snyder used a recording of the song by Allison Crowe for the scene, but decided Crowe's version was "too romantic" and "too sexy" for a scene that is intended to come across as ironic and "ridiculous". Snyder ended up placing the original Cohen studio recording in this scene. My Chemical Romance, whose members are fans of the comic, covered Dylan's "Desolation Row" for the first half of the closing credits. The second half is followed by "First We Take Manhattan" sung by Leonard Cohen.

The song "The Beginning Is the End Is the Beginning", composed by American alternative rock band the Smashing Pumpkins for the soundtrack of Batman & Robin, although used in a promotional trailer, was not included on the soundtrack of Watchmen. Also used in trailers but left off of the soundtrack is the track "Take A Bow" by English alternative rock band, Muse, from their 2006 album, Black Holes and Revelations. Also in the ads are "Angel" by Massive Attack.

== Track listing ==
No.	Title	Artist	Length
1.	"Desolation Row"	My Chemical Romance	3:01
2.	"Unforgettable"	Nat King Cole	3:28
3.	"The Times They Are a-Changin'"	Bob Dylan	3:14
4.	"The Sound of Silence"	Simon & Garfunkel	3:07
5.	"Me and Bobby McGee"	Janis Joplin	4:31
6.	"I'm Your Boogie Man"	KC and the Sunshine Band	4:03
7.	"You're My Thrill"	Billie Holiday	3:24
8.	"Pruit Igoe" and "Prophecies"	Philip Glass	8:37
9.	"Hallelujah"	Leonard Cohen	4:37
10.	"All Along the Watchtower"	The Jimi Hendrix Experience	4:01
11.	"Ride of the Valkyries"	Budapest Symphony Orchestra	5:22
12.	"Pirate Jenny"	Nina Simone	6:39

- Tales of the Black Freighter was based on the lyrics to "Pirate Jenny".

== Charts ==
Chart performance
Chart (2009)	Peak position
Australian Albums (ARIA)	65
Austrian Albums (Ö3 Austria)	58
Canadian Albums (Nielsen SoundScan)	35
Greek Albums (IFPI)	47
Mexican Albums (Top 100 Mexico)	82
UK Compilation Albums (OCC)	28
UK Soundtrack Albums (OCC)	4
US Billboard 200	30
US Soundtrack Albums (Billboard)	3

== See also ==
- Watchmen: Original Motion Picture Score
