= Chris Smither =

American songwriter (born 1944)

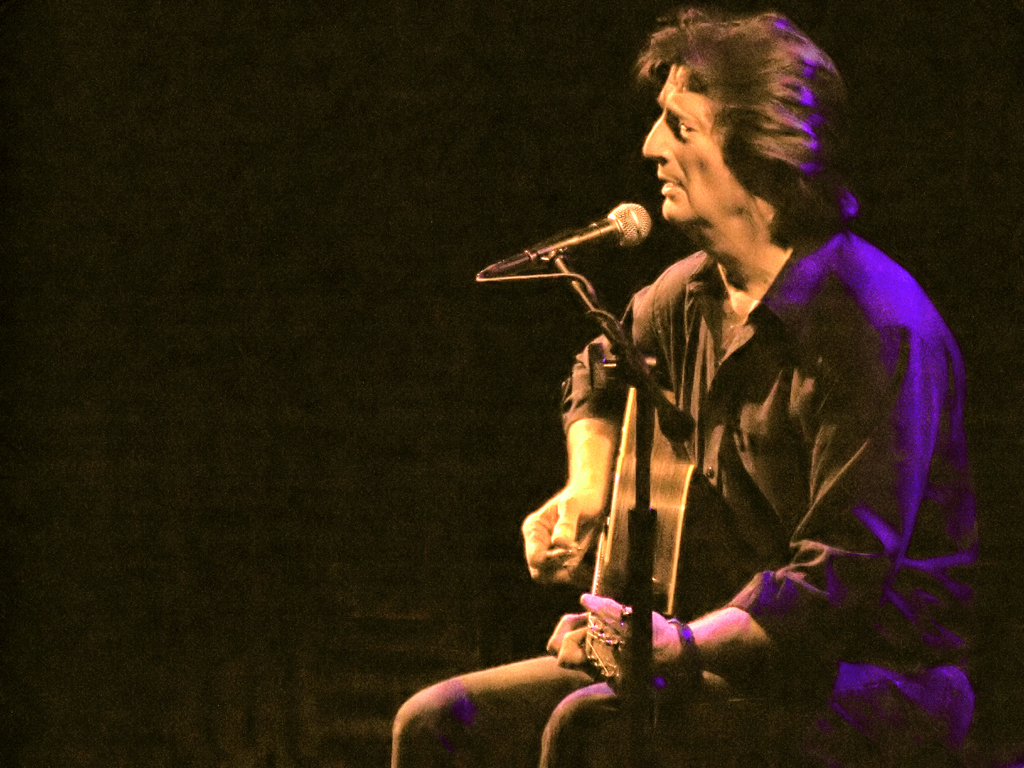
- Smither at Joe's Pub, New York City, September 2006

Background information
- Born: November 11, 1944 (age 81); Miami, Florida, U.S.
- Genres: Folk, rock, blues
- Occupation: Singer-songwriter
- Instruments: Vocals, guitar
- Years active: 1967–present
- Labels: Poppy, United Artists, Adelphi, Flying Fish, High Tone, Signature Sounds
- Website: www.smither.com

William Christopher Smither (born November 11, 1944) is an American folk/blues singer, guitarist, and songwriter. His music draws deeply from the blues, American folk music, and modern poets and philosophers.

== Early life, influences and education ==
He was born in Miami, Florida, United States to Catherine (nee Weaver) and William J. Smither. Although Smither does not himself credit family influence for his talents, uncle Howard E. Smither was an award-winning musicologist and author, and father William was a professor of Spanish and Mexican culture. The Smither family lived in Ecuador and the Rio Grande Valley in Texas before settling in New Orleans when Chris was three years old. He grew up in New Orleans, and lived briefly in Paris where he and his twin sister Mary Catherine attended French public school. In Paris Smither got his first guitar, which his father brought him from Spain. Shortly after, the family returned to New Orleans where his father taught at Tulane University.

In 1960, Smither and two friends entered and won a folk "Battle of the Bands" at the New Orleans Saenger Theatre. Two years later, Smither graduated from Benjamin Franklin High School in New Orleans and went on to attend the University of the Americas in Mexico City planning to study Latin-American anthropology like his father. It was there that a friend played Smither the Lightnin' Hopkins' record "Blues in My Bottle". After one year in Mexico, Smither returned to New Orleans where he attended Tulane for one year and discovered Mississippi John Hurt's music through the Blues at Newport 1963 album on Vanguard Records. Hurt and Hopkins would become cornerstone influences on Smither's own music.

In 1964, Smither flew to New York City two days prior to boarding the SS United States for the five-day transatlantic voyage to Paris for his Junior Year Abroad program, which his father helped administer for Tulane. While in New York, he stopped at The Gaslight Cafe to see his hero, Mississippi John Hurt. Once in Paris, Smither often spent time playing his guitar instead of attending classes.

Smither returned to New Orleans in 1965. With a few clothes and his guitar, he soon took off for Florida to meet another musical hero, Eric von Schmidt. Smither arrived uninvited at von Schmidt's door; von Schmidt welcomed Smither in, and upon listening to him play, advised him to go north to seek a place in the burgeoning folk scene in New York City or Cambridge, Massachusetts. Smither followed this advice, and arrived at Club 47 in Harvard Square several weeks later and found von Schmidt performing. Von Schmidt invited Smither on stage to play three songs.

== Professional career ==
Smither soon began writing and performing his own songs. He achieved some local notice and by 1967 was featured on the cover of The Broadside of Boston magazine. In 1968, music photographer David Gahr's book, The Face of Folk Music featured Smither's picture.

By 1969, after living in several places around Cambridge, Smither moved to Garfield Street in Cambridge and often visited Dick Waterman's house where Fred McDowell, Son House and other blues musicians were known to congregate. It was there that Smither first performed his song "Love You Like a Man" for Waterman's friend, Bonnie Raitt. That summer, he appeared at the Philadelphia Folk Festival for the first time.

In 1970, he released his first album I'm a Stranger Too! on Poppy Records, followed by Don't It Drag On the next year. He recorded a follow-up, Honeysuckle Dog, in 1973 for United Artists Records but Smither was dropped from the label and the album went unreleased until 2004, when it was issued by Tomato Records. Despite no longer having a recording contract, Smither continued to tour and became a fixture in New England's folk clubs.

In 1972, a longstanding working relationship with Bonnie Raitt took shape as Raitt's cover of "Love Me Like a Man" appeared on her third album Give It Up. Raitt made it a signature song of her live performances, and it has been included on several of her live albums and collections. She has expressed admiration for Smither's songwriting and guitar playing, once calling Smither "my Eric Clapton." In 1973, Raitt covered Smither's song "I Feel the Same" on her Takin' My Time album.

Following this early success, Smither's recording and songwriting career had a long fallow period while he struggled personally. In his official biography, Smither is quoted: "I was basically drunk for 12 years, and somehow I managed to climb out of it; I don't know why."

Smither began to re-emerge as a performer in the late 1970s, and gained a few press notices. In 1979, he was featured in Eric von Schmidt and Jim Rooney's book, Baby Let Me Follow You Down, and the next year in the UK's Melody Maker magazine.

In 1984, Smither's belated third album, It Ain't Easy was released on Adelphi Records, which the Boston Phoenix acoustic music critic Jon Herman called "the naked and sophisticated blues album that Eric von Schmidt, Rolf Cahn, Spider John Koerner, and other white revivalists groped for more than 20 years ago, at the dawn of the folk revival."

He recorded his next album, Another Way to Find You, in front of a live audience at Soundtrack Studio in Boston and in 1991 released it on Flying Fish Records. Later that year he received a Boston Music Award. Two years later, he was invited to compose music for a documentary on Southern folk artists and met Southern folk artist Mose T. In 1993, Smither recorded and released his fifth album, Happier Blue (Flying Fish), which earned Smither a National American Independent Record Distributors NAIRD award. Another two years later, he released Up on the Lowdown (Hightone Records), which was recorded at the Hit Shack in Austin, Texas. This was the first of three records produced by Stephen Bruton. Also that year, the Chris Smither Songbook I was published.

In 1996, he began recording live concerts in the US and Ireland for what would later become a live CD. The next year, he released his seventh album, Small Revelations (Hightone), and filmed an instructional guitar video for Happy Traum's Homespun Tapes in Woodstock, New York. In 1997, Smither's music was used exclusively on the entire score of the short film, The Ride, directed by John Flanders and produced by Flanders's company, RoughPine Productions. Flanders plays a folk-singer in the film who is largely influenced by Smither. The Ride won the Audience Best Film Award at the 2002 Moscow Film Festival.

1998 was a year of small breakthroughs and the start of a fertile songwriting and recording period for Smither. HighTone reissued Another Way to Find You and Happier Blue and Jorma Kaukonen invited Smither to teach at his Fur Peace Ranch in Ohio. In addition, Smither toured with Dave Alvin, Ramblin' Jack Elliott and Tom Russell as Hightone's Monsters of Folk tour, and Emmylou Harris recorded his song "Slow Surprise", for the Horse Whisperer soundtrack.

In 1999, Smither released Drive You Home Again (HighTone). Also in 1999 he went to New Zealand and played at the Sweetwaters Music Festival. In 2000, he released, Live As I'll Ever Be (HighTone), comprising the live recordings made two years earlier. His song "No Love Today" was featured in the Bravo network program Tale Lights. The following year, songwriter Peter Case invited Smither to be part of a Mississippi John Hurt tribute record for which he contributed the opening track, "Frankie and Albert". In 2003, Train Home was released on Hightone. In 2004, jazz singer Diana Krall covered "Love Me Like A Man" on her CD, The Girl in the Other Room.

In September 2006, Smither released Leave the Light On (Signature Sounds Recordings) produced by David 'Goody' Goodrich. His song, "Origin of Species," from the CD was named No. 42 on Rolling Stone Magazine's list of 100 Best Songs of the Year 2006. Smither was also named as 2007's Outstanding Folk Act by the Boston Music Awards. That year he also contributed an essay entitled "Become a Parent" to the book Sixty Things to Do When You Turn Sixty (Ronnie Sellers Productions). And he narrated a two-CD audio book recording of Will Rogers' Greatest Hits (Logofon Recordings).

Smither released a 78-minute live concert DVD, One More Night, (Signature Sounds) in February 2008. In May 2009, Smither's short story "Leroy Purcell" was published in Amplified (Melville House Publishing), a collection of fiction by fifteen prominent performing songwriters. Smither's thirteenth CD Time Stands Still was released on September 29, 2009, on Signature Sounds. On this, his most stripped down recording in some time, Smither worked with just two accompanists after the same trio had played a rare band performance – a non-solo setup required to play a Netherlands festival. About the recording Smither says, "We're the only three guys on this record, and most of the songs only have three parts going on. We had a freewheeling feeling at that festival gig, and we managed to make a lot of that same feeling happen in this record."

On February 8, 2011, Smither was profiled in The New York Times "Frequent Flier" column, entitled, "The Drawbacks of a Modest Celebrity," in which he recounts anecdotes from his four decades as a traveling musician.

Always wanting to treat his fans well, in 2011 Smither put out two fan projects: a collection of live tracks from newly discovered concert recordings from the 1980s–1990s titled Lost and Found and the rollicking EP, What I Learned in School, on which Smither covered six classic rock and roll songs. Smither followed these fan-projects with Hundred Dollar Valentine (2012), a studio record rated with five stars by the magazine MOJO. With longtime producer David "Goody" Goodrich at the helm, this collection sported the unmistakable sound Smither has made his trademark: fingerpicked acoustic guitar and evocative sonic textures meshed with spare, brilliant songs, delivered in a bone-wise, hard-won voice. American Songwriter magazine published Smither's blog about making his first record of all original material in his four-decade career.

In 2014, Chris Smither marked fifty years of songwriting with the release of Still on the Levee – a double-CD retrospective. Recorded in New Orleans at the Music Shed, this career-spanning project features fresh new takes on 24 iconic songs from his vast career – including "Devil Got Your Man," the first song he penned, on up to several of his most recent originals. The band included Billy Conway on drums. Coming out at the same time as Still on the Levee, the book Chris Smither Lyrics 1966–2012 features his complete set of lyrics complemented by select images and performance memorabilia from his decades-long career. To commemorate his career to-date, on September 30, 2014, Signature Sounds released an all-star tribute record (Link of Chain: A Songwriters' Tribute to Chris Smither) including a list of artists offering their takes on some Smither favorites including Josh Ritter, Bonnie Raitt, Loudon Wainwright III, Dave Alvin, Peter Case, Tim O'Brien and Patty Larkin.

The 2018 release Call Me Lucky also included Conway on drums.

== In pop culture ==
Several of author Linda Barnes’ books make reference to Chris Smither.

Keys to Tetuan by Israeli novelist Moshe Benarroch uses a line from Smither's song "I Am The Ride" on the opening page.

Smither appears in the short film The Singers, released in 2025. The film won the Academy Award for Best Live Action Short Film at the 98th Academy Awards.

== Discography ==
=== Albums ===
- 1970 – I'm a Stranger Too!
- 1971 – Don't It Drag On
- 1984 – It Ain't Easy
- 1991 – Another Way to Find You
- 1993 – Happier Blue
- 1995 – Up on the Lowdown
- 1997 – Small Revelations
- 1999 – Drive You Home Again
- 2000 – Live as I'll Ever Be
- 2003 – Train Home
- 2005 – Honeysuckle Dog (recorded in 1973)
- 2006 – Leave the Light On
- 2009 – Time Stands Still
- 2011 – Lost and Found
- 2012 – Hundred Dollar Valentine
- 2014 – Still on the Levee
- 2018 – Call Me Lucky
- 2020 – More From The Levee
- 2024 - All About The Bones

=== Live recordings ===
- Stuck in Amber, Bethlehem, Pennsylvania (1985)
- Chris Smither Live at McCabe's Guitar Shop 3/14/03 (2003)

=== Compilation albums ===
- Blues Live From Mountain Stage (The Devil's Real) (1995)
- Avalon Blues: A Tribute to the Music of Mississippi John Hurt (Frankie and Albert) (2001)
- Raise the Roof – A Retrospective (Winsome Smile) (2004)
- Various – 89.3 The Current by Minnesota Public Radio (Train Home) (2005)
- A Case for Case: A Tribute to the Songs of Peter Case (Cold Trail Blues) (2006)
- Tales from the Tavern, Vol.1 (Train Home) (2006)
- True Folk (Step It Up and Go with Jorma Kaukonen) (2006)
