= El Cancionero Mas y Mas =

El Cancionero: Mas y Mas

Box set by Los Lobos
- Released: November 7, 2000
- Recorded: 1977–2000
- Genres: Roots rock Chicano rock Latin rock
- Length: 5:01:03
- Label: Rhino/Warner Archives

Los Lobos chronology
This Time (1999)	El Cancionero: Mas y Mas (2000)	Good Morning Aztlán (2002)

Professional ratings
Review scores
Source	Rating
Allmusic	4.5/5 stars
The Guardian	4/5 stars
Rolling Stone Album Guide	4.5/5 stars

El Cancionero: Mas y Mas is a four-CD box set by the American rock band Los Lobos, released in 2000. It contains album tracks, live recordings, rarities, and alternate versions, as well as tracks from solo and side projects, soundtracks, and tribute albums. Of the eighty-six tracks on the box set, eleven are previously unissued.

"El Cancionero" translates as "songbook" or "the person who interprets songs," according to guitarist/drummer Louie Pérez. The set was the subject of an essay by author Nick Hornby in his collection Songbook.

== Reception ==
Writing for AllMusic, Stephen Thomas Erlewine called it "the definitive portrait of Los Lobos". He wrote, "As the set winds from the authentic Mexican folk music of 1977 through the gutsy roots rock of 1987 and the dreamy soundscapes of 1992 to the daring music of the mid-'90s and then the consolidation of their strengths on 1999's This Time, it's hard not to be astonished not just by the band's range, but the fact that they do it all really well."

The Guardian described the box set as "a comprehensive history of the band" with "dodgy patches among the triumphs". The eighty-six tracks are, according to The Guardian, "so varied it seems remarkable that they should be recorded by the same musicians."

== Track listing ==
Disc one: 1977 – 1987
No.	Title	Writer(s)	Original release	Length
1.	"Guantanamera"	José Diaz, José Marti, Julián Orbón, Pete Seeger	Los Lobos Del Este De Los Angeles (Just another band from East L.A.), 1978	4:52
2.	"Sabor A Mí"	Álvaro Carrillo	Los Lobos Del Este De Los Angeles (Just another band from East L.A.)	3:50
3.	"We're Gonna Rock"	Cesar Rosas	Various Artists: L.A. Rockabilly, 1983	2:13
4.	"Let's Say Goodnight"	David Hidalgo, Louie Pérez	...And a Time to Dance, 1983	2:35
5.	"Anselma"	César Suedan, Guadalupe Trigo	...And a Time to Dance	3:11
6.	"Why Do You Do"	Rosas	...And a Time to Dance	2:40
7.	"How Much Can I Do?"	Hidalgo, Pérez	...And a Time to Dance	2:21
8.	"I'm Sorry" (Live, 1984)	Ellas McDaniel, Harvey Fuqua, Alan Freed	previously unissued	2:30
9.	"Los Ojos De Pancha" (Live, 1984)	Juan Romero	previously unissued	2:25
10.	"Don't Worry Baby"	Rosas, Pérez, T-Bone Burnett	How Will the Wolf Survive?, 1984	2:47
11.	"I Got Loaded"	Camille Bob	How Will the Wolf Survive?	3:18
12.	"A Matter Of Time"	Hidalgo, Pérez	How Will the Wolf Survive?	3:49
13.	"Corrido #1"	Rosas	How Will the Wolf Survive?	2:41
14.	"Evangeline"	Hidalgo, Perez	How Will the Wolf Survive?	2:42
15.	"Lil' King Of Everything"	Hidalgo, Pérez	How Will the Wolf Survive?	1:19
16.	"Will the Wolf Survive?"	Hidalgo, Pérez	How Will the Wolf Survive?	3:42
17.	"Quatro Vicios" (Ry Cooder with David Hidalgo and Cesar Rosas)	Traditional, arranged by Ry Cooder	Ry Cooder: Music from the Motion Picture "Alamo Bay", 1985	3:38
18.	"I'm Gonna Be a Wheel Someday"	Dave Bartholomew, Roy Hayes, Antoine Domino	Various Artists: A Fine Mess: Original Motion Picture Soundtrack, 1986	2:09
19.	"One Time One Night"	Hidalgo, Pérez	By the Light of the Moon, 1987	4:49
20.	"Shakin' Shakin' Shakes"	Rosas, Burnett	By the Light of the Moon	4:12
21.	"Is This All There Is?"	Hidalgo, Pérez	By the Light of the Moon	3:58
22.	"My Baby's Gone"	Rosas	By the Light of the Moon	3:41
23.	"River of Fools"	Hidalgo, Pérez	By the Light of the Moon	2:55
24.	"Set Me Free (Rosa Lee)"	Rosas	By the Light of the Moon	3:39
25.	"Tears Of God"	Hidalgo, Pérez	By the Light of the Moon	3:43

Note

- Tracks 8 and 9 recorded live January 14, 1984 at La Casa de la Raza, Santa Barbara, California.

Disc two: 1987 – 1992
No.	Title	Writer(s)	Original release	Length
1.	"La Bamba"	Traditional, arranged by Ritchie Valens	Various Artists: La Bamba (soundtrack), 1987	2:55
2.	"Come On, Let's Go"	Valens	Various Artists: La Bamba (soundtrack)	2:12
3.	"Goodnight My Love"	George Motola, John Marascalco	Various Artists: La Bamba (soundtrack)	3:16
4.	"Rip It Up"	Robert Blackwell, Marascalco	Various Artists: La Bamba (soundtrack); previously unissued outtake	1:40
5.	"Volver, Volver" (Live, 1987)	Fernando Maldonado	Just Another Band from East L.A.: A Collection, 1993	3:47
6.	"I Wan'na Be like You (The Monkey Song)"	Richard M. Sherman, Robert B. Sherman	Various Artists: Stay Awake: Various Interpretations of Music from Vintage Disney Films, 1988	3:17
7.	"Estoy Sentado Aqui"	Rosas	La Pistola y El Corazón, 1988	2:28
8.	"La Pistola y El Corazón"	Hidalgo, Pérez	La Pistola y El Corazón	3:30
9.	"I Can't Understand"	Rosas, Willie Dixon	The Neighborhood, 1990	4:00
10.	"Someday"	Hidalgo, Pérez	Just Another Band from East L.A.: A Collection; outtake from The Neighborhood sessions	3:43
11.	"I Walk Alone"	Hidalgo, Pérez	The Neighborhood	3:00
12.	"Angel Dance"	Hidalgo, Pérez	The Neighborhood	3:13
13.	"Little John of God"	Hidalgo, Pérez	The Neighborhood	2:20
14.	"Down on the Riverbed"	Hidalgo, Pérez	The Neighborhood	4:06
15.	"Till the Hands Fall Off the Clock"	Hidalgo, Pérez	previously unissued; outtake from The Neighborhood sessions	3:55
16.	"Be Still"	Hidalgo, Pérez	The Neighborhood	3:34
17.	"The Neighborhood"	Hidalgo, Pérez	The Neighborhood	4:10
18.	"Bertha"	Robert Hunter, Jerry Garcia	Various Artists: Deadicated: A Tribute to the Grateful Dead, 1991	5:48
19.	"Bella Maria De Mi Alma"	Robert Kraft, Arne Glimcher	Various Artists: The Mambo Kings: Original Motion Picture Soundtrack, 1992	4:29
20.	"The Christmas Song" (Cesar Rosas & Steve Berlin; live, 1987)	Mel Tormé, Robert Wells	Various Artists: Yulesville, 1987	2:39

Notes

- Track 5 recorded live December 11, 1987 at the Hollywood Palladium, Hollywood, California.
- Track 20 recorded live October 18, 1987 in Burbank, California.

Disc three: 1992 – 1996
No.	Title	Writer(s)	Original release	Length
1.	"Dream in Blue"	Hidalgo, Pérez	Kiko, 1992	3:34
2.	"Wicked Rain"	Rosas	Kiko	3:04
3.	"Angels with Dirty Faces"	Hidalgo, Pérez	Kiko	4:03
4.	"That Train Don't Stop Here"	Rosas, Leroy Preston	Kiko	3:52
5.	"Kiko and the Lavender Moon"	Hidalgo, Pérez	Kiko	3:37
6.	"Saint Behind the Glass"	Hidalgo, Pérez	Kiko	3:19
7.	"When the Circus Comes"	Hidalgo, Pérez	Kiko	3:16
8.	"Peace" (Demo)	Hidalgo, Pérez	previously unissued	4:19
9.	"Rio de Tenampa" (Demo)	Hidalgo, Pérez	previously unissued	5:05
10.	"Try Me"	James Brown	from the film Untamed Heart, 1993; previously unissued	2:33
11.	"Alone in a Crowd"	John Genzale	Various Artists: I Only Wrote this Song for You: A Tribute to Johnny Thunders, 1994	3:00
12.	"Tomorrow Never Knows" (Live, 1993)	John Lennon, Paul McCartney	from the Lonesome Pine/PBS TV special In The Spotlight: A Beatles Songbook, aired 5 May 1993; previously unissued	5:14
13.	"Forever Night Shade Mary" (Latin Playboys)	Hidalgo, Pérez	Latin Playboys: Latin Playboys, 1994	3:05
14.	"Same Brown Earth" (Latin Playboys)	Hidalgo, Pérez	Latin Playboys: Latin Playboys	3:45
15.	"Down Where the Drunkards Roll"	Richard Thompson	Various Artists: Beat the Retreat: Songs by Richard Thompson, 1994	3:40
16.	"Route 90"	Clarence Garlow, Leon René	Papa's Dream, 1995	3:22
17.	"Lonely Avenue"	Doc Pomus	Various Artists: Till the Night is Gone: A Tribute to Doc Pomus, 1995	3:38
18.	"Midnight Shift"	Jimmy Ainsworth, Earl Lee	Various Artists: Not Fade Away (Remembering Buddy Holly), 1996	2:56
19.	"Mariachi Suite"	Hidalgo, Rosas, Conrad Lozano, Pérez, Steve Berlin	Various Artists: Desperado: The Soundtrack, 1995	4:22
20.	"She's About a Mover" (Live, 1996)	Doug Sahm	promotional single, 1996	4:25

Notes

- Track 12 recorded live January 9, 1993 at the Moritz von Bomhard Theatre/Kentucky Center for the Performing Arts, Louisville, Kentucky.
- Track 20 recorded live May 16, 1996 at the Wells Fargo Theater/Autry Museum of the American West, Los Angeles, California.

Disc four: 1998 – 2000
No.	Title	Writer(s)	Original release	Length
1.	"Revolution"	Hidalgo, Pérez	Colossal Head, 1996	3:07
2.	"Mas y Mas"	Hidalgo, Pérez	Colossal Head	4:42
3.	"Maricela"	Rosas	Colossal Head	3:50
4.	"Can't Stop the Rain"	Rosas	Colossal Head	3:35
5.	"This Bird's Gonna Fly"	Rosas	Colossal Head	4:16
6.	"Pepe & Irene" (with Money Mark)	Hidalgo, Pérez, Mark Nishita, Mario Caldato	Various Artists: Silencio=Muerte: Red Hot + Latin, 1997	3:33
7.	"Lonesome Tears in My Eyes" (with Paul Burlison)	Johnny Burnette, Dorsey Burnette, Paul Burlison, Al Mortimer	Paul Burlison: Train Kept A-Rollin', 1997	3:51
8.	"Me Estas Matando"	Rosas	Various Artists: The End of Violence: Songs from the Motion Picture Soundtrack, 1997	3:48
9.	"El Canoero" (Los Super Seven)	Traditional, arranged by Valerio Longoria	Los Super Seven: Los Super Seven, 1998	3:19
10.	"La Sirena" (Los Super Seven)	Traditional, arranged by Hidalgo	Los Super Seven: Los Super Seven	2:53
11.	"El Pescador" (Los Super Seven)	Lorenzo Barcelata	Los Super Seven: Canto, 2001	4:29
12.	"Little Heaven" (Cesar Rosas)	Rosas, Preston	Cesar Rosas: Soul Disguise, 1999	3:39
13.	"Soul Disguise" (Cesar Rosas)	Rosas, Preston	Cesar Rosas: Soul Disguise	3:19
14.	"Angelito" (Cesar Rosas)	Rosas	Cesar Rosas: Soul Disguise	4:25
15.	"Lemon 'n Ice" (Latin Playboys)	Hidalgo, Pérez	Latin Playboys: Dose, 1999	3:51
16.	"I'll Change My Style" (Houndog)	David Parker, Manuel Villa	Houndog: Houndog, 1999	3:49
17.	"Cumbia Raza (English version)"	Rosas	promotional single, 2000	2:52
18.	"Oh Yeah"	Rosas, Pérez	This Time, 1999	3:48
19.	"Viking"	Hidalgo, Pérez	This Time	3:32
20.	"This Time"	Hidalgo, Pérez	This Time	5:18
21.	"What's Going On" (with Sheryl Crow; live 1997)	Renaldo Benson, Al Cleveland, Marvin Gaye	This Time; Japanese bonus track	3:33

Note

- Track 21 recorded live August 2, 1997 at Molson Park, Barrie, Ontario, Canada.

== Personnel ==
Credits adapted from the album's liner notes.

Los Lobos

- David Hidalgo – vocals, electric and acoustic guitars, accordion, violin, banjo, 6-string bass, piano, drums, percussion
- Cesar Rosas – vocals, electric and acoustic guitars, mandolin
- Louie Pérez – drums, percussion, guitar, fraustophone, vocals, lead vocals on "Alone in a Crowd"
- Conrad Lozano – electric and acoustic basses, fretless bass, guitarrón, vocals, lead vocals on "Guantanamera"
- Steve Berlin – saxophones, flute, harmonica, melodica, keyboards, percussion

Additional musicians

- Charlie Tovar – congas, percussion (Disc one: 1, 2)
- T-Bone Burnett – acoustic guitar, organ (Disc one: 10-16), vocals (Disc one: 19-25)
- Alex Acuña – percussion (Disc one: 10-16, 19-25 / Disc two: 6, 12, 19 / Disc three: 1-7 / Disc four: 17), hand drums (Disc two: 11), shekere (Disc two: 14), drums (Disc four: 17)
- Ry Cooder – accordion, bajo sexto (Disc one: 17)
- Jim Dickinson – piano (Disc one: 17)
- Jorge Calderon – bass (Disc one: 17)
- Jim Keltner – drums (Disc one: 17 / Disc two: 16, 17), percussion (Disc one: 17 / Disc two: 17)
- Mitchell Froom – keyboards (Disc one: 19-25 / Disc three: 1-7, 13, 14 / Disc four: 15, 17-20), harmonium (Disc two: 12)
- Mickey Curry – drums (Disc one: 19-25 / Disc two: 1)
- Anton Fier – drums (Disc one: 19-25)
- Ron Tutt – drums (Disc one: 19-25)
- John Hiatt – vocals (Disc one: 19 / Disc two: 14)
- Danny Timms – organ, Wurlitzer (Disc two: 14), piano (Disc two: 16)
- Jerry Marrota – drums (Disc two: 11, 14 / Disc 4: 15), percussion (Disc four: 15)
- Levon Helm – vocals (Disc two: 13)
- Victor Bisetti – percussion (Disc two: 18 / Disc three: 1-10, 15-17, 19, 20 / Disc four: 1-8, 17-21), drums (Disc three: 8-12, 15, 17-20 / Disc four: 7, 12-14)
- Fermin Herrera – Veracruz harp (Disc three: 6)
- Pete Thomas – drums (Disc three: 1-7 / Disc four: 1-5, 18, 19)
- La Chilapeña Brass Band – horns (Disc three: 9)
- Tchad Blake – bass, guitar (Disc three: 13, 14 / Disc four: 15)
- Robert Rodriguez – guitar (Disc three: 19)
- Yuka Honda – keyboards, sampling (Disc four: 1-5)
- Efrain Toro – percussion (Disc four: 1-5)
- Money Mark – keyboards (Disc four: 6)
- Paul Burlison – guitar (Disc four: 7)
- Jim Weider – guitar (Disc four: 7)
- Joe Ely – guitar, vocals (Disc four: 9, 10)
- Rick Trevino – guitar (Disc four: 9, 10), vocals (Disc four: 9-11)
- Freddy Fender – acoustic bass, vocals (Disc four: 9, 10)
- Ruben Ramos – vocals (Disc four: 9-11)
- Joel Guzman – piano, organ, accordion, percussion, vocals (Disc four: 9, 10)
- Max Baca – bajo sexto, bass, drums, vocals (Disc four: 9, 10)
- Sarah Fox – backing vocals (Disc four: 9)
- Will-Dog – bass (Disc four: 11)
- Alberto Salas – piano, percussion (Disc four: 11)
- Cougar Estrada – drums, percussion (Disc four: 11)
- Raul Malo – vocals (Disc four: 11)
- Eddie Baytos – organ (Disc four: 12, 13)
- Flaco Jiménez – accordion, vocals (Disc four: 14)
- Wendy Melvoin – vocals (Disc four: 15)
- Lisa Coleman – vocals (Disc four: 15)
- Mike Halby – vocals, instruments (Disc four: 16)
- Aaron Ballesteros – drums (Disc four: 20)
- Sheryl Crow – vocals (Disc four: 21)

Technical

- Luis R. Torres – producer (Disc one: 1, 2)
- Los Lobos – producer (Disc one: 1, 2, 18-25 / Disc two: 7-11, 13-19 / Disc three: 1-11, 16-19 / Disc four: 1-6, 8, 17-20)
- Steve Berlin – producer (Disc one: 3-7, 10-16 / Disc two: 2-4 / Disc four: 9-11), mixing (Disc three: 18, 19)
- T-Bone Burnett – producer (Disc one: 4-7, 10-16, 19-25)
- Larry Hirsch – producer (Disc two: 9-11, 13-17), engineer (Disc one: 15, 18-25 / Disc two: 6-11, 13-17), mixing (Disc one: 15, 18 / Disc two: 9-17)
- Ry Cooder – producer (Disc one: 17)
- Mitchell Froom – producer (Disc two: 1, 12 / Disc three: 1-7 / Disc four: 1-5, 17-20)
- Hal Willner – producer (Disc two: 6)
- Tchad Blake – producer (Disc four: 1-5, 17-20), engineer (Disc two: 12 / Disc three: 1-7 / Disc four: 1-5, 17-20), mixing (Disc three: 1-7, 11, 17 / Disc four: 18-20)
- Latin Playboys – producer, engineer, mixing (Disc three: 13, 14 / Disc four: 15)
- John Chelew – producer (Disc three: 15)
- Leib Ostrow – producer (Disc three: 16)
- Eugene Rodriguez – producer (Disc three: 16)
- Cesar Rosas – producer (Disc four: 12-14, 21), engineer (Disc three: 16, 18, 19 / Disc four: 12-14), mixing (Disc three: 16 / Disc four: 8, 17, 21)
- Mario Caldato Jr. – producer, engineer, mixing (Disc four: 6)
- Jim Weider – producer (Disc four: 7)
- David Hidalgo – producer (Disc four: 16)
- David Sandoval – associate producer (Disc one: 1, 2)
- Joe Schiff – associate producer, engineer, mixing (Disc three: 15), assistant engineer (Disc two: 9-11, 13-17)
- David Hirshland – associate producer (Disc three: 15)
- Patrick Flynn – engineer (Disc one: 1, 2)
- Mark Fleisher – engineer, mixing (Disc one: 1, 2)
- George Johnsen – engineer (Disc one: 3)
- Mark Linett – engineer (Disc one: 4-14, 16), mixing (Disc one: 4-7), remixing engineer (Disc one: 21)
- Mark Ettel – engineer, mixing (Disc one: 17)
- Stephen Shelton – engineer (Disc two: 6), assistant engineer (Disc one: 19-25)
- Bob Schaper – engineer (Disc two: 1-4 / Disc four: 6), mixing (Disc two: 19 / Disc three: 18)
- Keith Keller – engineer (Disc two: 5)
- Scott Woodman – engineer (Disc two: 7, 8)
- Stacy Baird – engineer (Disc two: 9-11, 13-17)
- Clark German – engineer (Disc two: 9-11, 13-17)
- Dusty Wakeman – engineer (Disc two: 18)
- Peter Doell – engineer (Disc two: 18)
- Paul duGré – engineer (Disc two: 19 / Disc 3: 8, 9), mixing (Disc three: 8, 9)
- John Paterno – engineer (Disc four: 1-5, 7, 8, 17-20), assistant engineer (Disc three: 1-7, 13, 14 / Disc four: 15), mixing (Disc four: 8, 12-14)
- Bill Jackson – engineer (Disc three: 10, 17, 19), mixing (Disc three: 19)
- David Wells – engineer (Disc three: 11, 16)
- Warren Dennis – engineer, mixing (Disc three: 16)
- Dave McNair – engineer (Disc four: 9-11), mixing (Disc four: 9, 10)
- Husky Hoskulds – engineer (Disc four: 17-20), assistant engineer (Disc four: 15)
- Mike Monroe – engineer (Disc four: 16)
- Louis Stetzel – engineer (Disc four: 21)
- Charles Paakkari – assistant engineer (Disc one: 10-14, 16)
- Judy Clapp – assistant engineer (Disc one: 17)
- David Glover – assistant engineer (Disc one: 19-25)
- Mike Kloster – assistant engineer (Disc one: 19-25)
- Jimmy Preziosi – assistant engineer (Disc one: 19-25)
- Doug Schwartz – assistant engineer (Disc one: 19-25)
- Tony Chiappa – assistant engineer (Disc one: 17, 19-25)
- Magic Moreno – assistant engineer (Disc one: 19-25)
- Dan Bosworth – assistant engineer (Disc two: 9-11, 13-17 / Disc three: 1-7))
- Eric Rudd – assistant engineer (Disc two: 9-11, 13-17)
- Brian Soucy – assistant engineer (Disc two: 9-11, 13-17), mixing (Disc four: 17)
- Tom Nellen – assistant engineer (Disc two: 9-11, 13-17)
- Neal Avron – assistant engineer (Disc two: 9-11, 13-17)
- Julie Last – assistant engineer (Disc two: 12)
- Wendy Thompson – assistant engineer (Disc two: 19 / Disc three: 8, 9)
- Steve Gamberoni – assistant engineer (Disc four: 9, 10)
- Fred Rennert – assistant engineer (Disc four: 9, 10)
- Robert Breen – assistant engineer (Disc four: 11)
- Howard Willing – assistant engineer (Disc four: 17-20)
- Josh Turner – assistant engineer (Disc four: 17-20)
- Joe Zook – assistant engineer (Disc four: 17-20)
- Joe Ferla – mixing (Disc two: 6)
- Ralph Sall – mixing (Disc two: 18)
- Ray Blair – mixing engineer (Disc two: 18)
- Mike Kloster – mixing assistant (Disc two: 19)
- Michael Prince – mixing (Disc three: 16)
- John Holbrook – mixing (Disc four: 7)
- Paul Rabjohns – digital assembly (Disc three: 19)

Box set

- Gary Stewart – producer
- Tim Bernett – executive producer
- Los Lobos – executive producer
- Bill Inglot – remastering, sound producer
- Dan Hersch – remastering
- Cesar Rosas – music research
- Jo Motta – project coordinator
- Gary Peterson – discographical annotation
- Steve Berlin – discographical annotation
- Vanessa Atkins – editorial supervision
- Sheryl Farber – editorial supervision
- Daniel Goldmark – editorial research
- Louie Pérez – editorial direction, art supervision
- Shawn Amos – A&R editorial coordinator
- Hugh Brown – art direction
- Al Quattrocchi – art direction
- Jeff Smith – art direction
- Tornado Design – design
- James Austin – cover inspiration
- Stan Grant – cover painting
