= Just Another Band from East L.A. – A Collection =

Just Another Band From East L.A. - A Collection

Compilation album by Los Lobos
- Released: 31 August 1993
- Recorded: 1978–1993
- Genres: Chicano Rock, Roots Rock, Tex-Mex, Latin Rock, Heartland Rock
- Length: 2:26:16
- Labels: Slash/Warner Bros. (US); Slash/London (Europe)
- Producers: Los Lobos; T-Bone Burnett; Steve Berlin; Mitchell Froom; Larry Hirsch

Los Lobos chronology
Kiko (1992)	Just Another Band From East L.A. - A Collection (1993)	Papa's Dream (1995)

Professional ratings
Review scores
Source	Rating
AllMusic	4.5/5 stars
The Encyclopedia of Popular Music	4/5 stars
Rolling Stone Album Guide	4/5 stars
Spin Alternative Record Guide	9/10

Just Another Band from East L.A.–A Collection is a two-CD compilation album by Los Lobos, released in 1993. It chronicles the first fifteen years of the band's recordings, spanning from 1978 to 1993, and includes album tracks, soundtrack contributions, live recordings, and previously unreleased material.

== Track listing ==
Disc one
No.	Title	Writer(s)	Original release	Length
1.	"Volver, Volver" (Live, 1987)	Fernando Z. Maldonado	previously unreleased	3:47
2.	"El Cuchipe"	Ismael Orozco, Eduardo Gómez Bueno	Los Lobos del Este de Los Angeles, 1978	2:19
3.	"La Feria de la Flores"	Jesus Monge	Los Lobos del Este de Los Angeles	3:49
4.	"Sabor a Mí"	Álvaro Carrillo	Los Lobos del Este de Los Angeles	3:40
5.	"Let's Say Goodnight" (Live, 1987)	David Hidalgo, Louie Pérez	previously unreleased; originally from ...And a Time to Dance, 1983	3:29
6.	"Anselma"	Cesar Suedan, Guadalupe Trigo	...And a Time to Dance	3:08
7.	"Will the Wolf Survive?"	Hidalgo, Pérez	How Will the Wolf Survive?, 1984	3:43
8.	"A Matter of Time"	Hidalgo, Pérez	How Will the Wolf Survive?	3:48
9.	"I Got to Let You Know" (Live, 1987)	Cesar Rosas	previously unreleased; originally from How Will the Wolf Survive?	2:35
10.	"Don't Worry Baby"	Rosas, Pérez, T-Bone Burnett	How Will the Wolf Survive?	2:46
11.	"One Time One Night"	Hidalgo, Pérez	By the Light of the Moon, 1987	4:48
12.	"Shakin' Shakin' Shakes"	Rosas, Burnett	By the Light of the Moon	4:10
13.	"River of Fools" (Live, 1992)	Hidalgo, Pérez	previously unreleased; originally from By the Light of the Moon	2:42
14.	"Carabina.30-30" (Live, 1992)	Genaro Nunez	previously unreleased	3:36
15.	"Tears of God"	Hidalgo, Pérez	By the Light of the Moon	3:45
16.	"Set Me Free (Rosa Lee)"	Rosas	By the Light of the Moon	3:35
17.	"Come On, Let's Go"	Ritchie Valens	La Bamba (soundtrack), 1987	2:00
18.	"La Bamba"	Traditional, arr. Valens	La Bamba (soundtrack)	2:52
19.	"El Gusto"	Elpidio Ramirez	La Pistola y El Corazón, 1988	2:56
20.	"Estoy Sentado Aqui"	Rosas	La Pistola y El Corazón	2:27
21.	"La Pistola y El Corazón"	Hidalgo, Pérez	La Pistola y El Corazón	3:28
22.	"I Wanna Be Like You (The Monkey Song)"	Richard M. Sherman, Robert B. Sherman	Stay Awake: Various Interpretations of Music from Vintage Disney Films, 1988	3:17
Total length:				72:05

Disc two
No.	Title	Writer(s)	Original release	Length
1.	"Someday"	Hidalgo, Pérez	previously unreleased; 1989 outtake from The Neighborhood sessions	3:42
2.	"Down on the Riverbed"	Hidalgo, Pérez	The Neighborhood, 1990	4:05
3.	"Be Still"	Hidalgo, Pérez	The Neighborhood	3:34
4.	"The Neighborhood"	Hidalgo, Pérez	The Neighborhood	4:07
5.	"I Can't Understand"	Rosas, Willie Dixon	The Neighborhood	3:57
6.	"Angel Dance"	Hidalgo, Pérez	The Neighborhood	3:12
7.	"Bertha" (Live, 1992)	Jerry Garcia, Robert Hunter	previously unreleased; originally from Deadicated: A Tribute to the Grateful Dead, 1991	4:59
8.	"Saint Behind the Glass"	Hidalgo, Pérez	Kiko, 1992	3:15
9.	"Angels with Dirty Faces"	Hidalgo, Pérez	Kiko	4:02
10.	"Wicked Rain" (Live, 1992)	Rosas	previously unreleased; originally from Kiko	3:36
11.	"Kiko and the Lavender Moon"	Hidalgo, Pérez	Kiko	3:35
12.	"When the Circus Comes"	Hidalgo, Pérez	Kiko	3:15
13.	"Peace" (Live, 1992)	Hidalgo, Pérez	previously unreleased; originally from Kiko	6:21
14.	"Bella Maria De Mi Alma"	Robert Kraft, Arne Glimcher	The Mambo Kings: Original Motion Picture Soundtrack, 1992	4:26
15.	"What's Going On" (Live, 1992)	Al Cleveland, Renaldo Benson, Marvin Gaye	previously unreleased	4:51
16.	"Wrong Man Theme"	Los Lobos	from the television film The Wrong Man, 1993; previously unreleased	1:45
17.	"Blue Moonlight"	Rosas, Pérez	from the television film The Wrong Man; previously unreleased	3:46
18.	"Politician" (Live, 1992)	Jack Bruce, Pete Brown	previously unreleased	4:35
19.	"New Zandu"	Hidalgo, Pérez	Previously unreleased	3:08
Total length:				74:11

Notes

- "Volver, Volver" and "Let's Say Goodnight" recorded live December 11, 1987, at the Hollywood Palladium in Hollywood
- "I Got to Let You Know" recorded live February 25, 1987, at the Paradiso in Amsterdam
- "River of Fools" recorded live September 27, 1992, at Alberta Bair Theater in Billings, Montana
- "Carabina.30-30", "Wicked Rain", "Peace" and "Politician" recorded live November 16, 1992, at The Barns at Wolf Trap in Vienna, Virginia
- "Bertha" recorded live November 6, 1992, at The Carefree Theatre in West Palm Beach, Florida
- "What's Going On" recorded live September 12, 1992, at World Music Theatre in Tinley Park, Illinois

== Personnel ==
Los Lobos

- David Hidalgo
- Cesar Rosas
- Louie Pérez
- Conrad Lozano
- Steve Berlin

Production

- T-Bone Burnett – producer (Disc one: 6–8, 10–12, 15, 16)
- Steve Berlin – producer (Disc one: 6–8, 10, 17), mixing (Disc one: 9, 14 / Disc two: 7, 10, 13, 18)
- Los Lobos – producer (Disc one: 2–4, 11, 12, 15, 16, 19–21 / Disc two: 1–5, 8, 9, 11, 12, 14, 16, 17)
- Luis Torres – producer (Disc one: 2–4), liner notes
- Mitchell Froom – producer (Disc one: 18 / Disc two: 6, 8, 9, 11, 12, 19)
- Hal Willner – producer (Disc one: 22)
- Larry Hirsch – producer (Disc two: 1–5)
- Tchad Blake – producer (Disc two: 19)
- Keith Keller – engineer (Disc one: 1, 5)
- Cesar Rosas – engineer (Disc one: 9, 13, 14 / Disc two: 7, 10, 13, 18), mixing (Disc one: 9, 14 / Disc two: 7, 10, 13, 18)
- David Wells – engineer (Disc one: 9, 13, 14 / Disc two: 7, 10, 13, 18)
- Paul duGré – mixing (Disc one: 9, 14 / Disc two: 7, 10, 13, 18)
- Timothy Powell – engineer (Disc two: 15)
- Dave Collins – mastering

== Charts ==
Chart (1993)	Peak position
US Billboard 200	196
