= Good Morning Aztlán =

Studio album by Los Lobos
- Released: June 4, 2002
- Studios: CRG, Rowland Heights, California; Sunset Sound Factory, Hollywood, California
- Genre: Rock
- Length: 47:46
- Label: Mammoth
- Producers: Los Lobos, John Leckie

Los Lobos chronology
El Cancionero Mas y Mas (2000)	Good Morning Aztlán (2002)	The Ride (2004)

Professional ratings
Review scores
Source	Rating
AllMusic	4.5/5 stars
Rolling Stone	4/5 stars
Rolling Stone Album Guide	4/5 stars

Good Morning Aztlán is a studio album by the American band Los Lobos, released in 2002. It was reissued in 2004 (Mobile Fidelity SACD reissue).

== Track listing ==
All tracks are written by David Hidalgo and Louie Pérez, except where noted.

No.	Title	Writer(s)	Length
1.	"Done Gone Blue"		3:50
2.	"Hearts of Stone"		4:54
3.	"Luz de Mi Vida"	Cesar Rosas, Pérez	3:42
4.	"Good Morning Aztlán"		4:07
5.	"The Big Ranch"		3:53
6.	"The Word"	Rosas, Pérez	5:08
7.	"Malaqué"		4:32
8.	"Tony y Maria"		3:14
9.	"Get to This"		3:37
10.	"Maria Christina"	Rosas	3:12
11.	"What in the World"		2:50
12.	"Round & Round"		4:47

Bonus enhanced CD
No.	Title	Writer(s)	Length
1.	"Can't Stop the Rain" (Live)	Rosas	3:16
2.	"Manny's Bones" (Live)		3:18
3.	"Good Morning Aztlán documentary" (Video)

Note

- The original 2002 Mammoth Records issue came with a second CD containing two previously unreleased live recordings. It also included a documentary by Anastasia Simone and Ian Spencer about the making of the album.

== Personnel ==
Los Lobos

- David Hidalgo – guitar, vocals, bass, keyboards, requinto jarocho, melodica, drums
- Cesar Rosas – guitar, vocals, quatro
- Conrad Lozano – bass, vocals
- Louie Pérez – guitar, jarana, drums, percussion
- Steve Berlin – saxophone, flutes, MIDIsaxophone, keyboards, percussion

Additional musicians

- Pete Thomas – drums (1, 2, 4, 5)
- Cougar Estrada – drums (3, 7, 9, 10), percussion (7, 9, 10, 12)
- Rick Marotta – drums (6)
- Victor Bisetti – percussion (7, 8, 9, 10)
- Bucky Baxter – pedal steel guitar (1, 5, 8)
- Martha Gonzalez – background vocals (2, 8, 10, 12)
- Fermin Herrera – Veracruz harp (7)

Production

- Los Lobos – producer (all tracks)
- John Leckie – producer (all tracks, except 4, 8, 10), engineer, mixing
- Dave McNair – engineer, mixing
- Seth McLain – assistant engineer
- Kevin Dean – assistant engineer, mixing assistant
- Steven Rhodes – mixing assistant
- Bob Shaper – engineer, mixing (bonus CD)
- Robert Hadley – mastering
- Louie Perez – art direction
- Al Quattrocchi – art direction
- Jeff Smith – art direction
- Toronto Design, Los Angeles – design
- Sandow Birk – cover printing
- Mark Van S – photography

== Charts ==
Chart (2002)	Peak position
Italian Albums (FIMI)	48
US Billboard 200	82

"Hearts of Stone"

Chart (2002)	Peak position
US Adult Alternative Airplay (Billboard)	14
