= This Time (Los Lobos album) =

Studio album by Los Lobos
- Released: July 20, 1999
- Studios: Sunset Sound Factory, Hollywood, California
- Genres: Roots rock Chicano rock
- Length: 38:11
- Label: Hollywood
- Producers: Mitchell Froom, Tchad Blake, Los Lobos

Los Lobos chronology
Colossal Head (1996)	This Time (1999)	El Cancionero Mas y Mas (2000)

Professional ratings
Review scores
Source	Rating
AllMusic	3/5 stars
Robert Christgau	(3-star Honorable Mention)
Rolling Stone	3.5/5 stars
Rolling Stone Album Guide	4/5 stars

This Time is a studio album by Los Lobos, released in 1999 on Hollywood Records.

== Critical reception ==
Entertainment Weekly wrote that "the important thing is that Los Lobos do fusion like nobody else, twisting a tangle of influences into tightly wound explorations of sound and rhythm that are genuinely electric, not just eclectic."

== Track listing ==
All tracks are written by David Hidalgo and Louie Pérez, except where noted.

No.	Title	Writer(s)	Length
1.	"This Time"		3:31
2.	"Oh Yeah"	Cesar Rosas, Pérez	3:44
3.	"Viking"		3:30
4.	"High Places"		4:21
5.	"Cumbia Raza"	Rosas	2:45
6.	"Run Away With You"		3:03
7.	"Corazõn"		4:05
8.	"Some Say, Some Do"	Rosas, Pérez	3:09
9.	"Turn Around"		3:45
10.	"La Playa"		3:12
11.	"Why We Wish"		2:53

== Personnel ==
On the liner notes, the specific contributions of the members of Los Lobos are not mentioned, but are assumed to be the "usual," as noted below. Other personnel are credited as described below.

Los Lobos

- David Hidalgo – vocals, guitar, accordion, fiddle, requinto jarocho
- Louie Pérez – vocals, guitar, jarana
- Cesar Rosas – vocals, guitar, bajo sexto
- Conrad Lozano – vocals, bass, guitarron
- Steve Berlin – keyboards, horns

Additional musicians

- Pete Thomas – drums on all tracks except "Corazõn," "Cumbia Raza," and "This Time"
- Alex Acuña – drums and percussion on "Corazõn" and "Cumbia Raza"
- Aaron Ballesteros – drums on "This Time"
- Victor Bisetti – percussion
- Mitchell Froom – additional keyboards

Production

- Mitchell Froom – producer
- Tchad Blake – producer, engineer, mixing
- Los Lobos – producer
- John Paterno – engineer
- Husky S. Hoskulds – engineer
- Howard Willing – assistant engineer
- Josh Turner – assistant engineer
- Joe Zook – assistant engineer
- Bob Ludwig – mastering
- John Heiden – art direction
- Jeri Heiden – art direction
- Louie Pérez – art direction, Polaroid photography, art
- Clay Patrick McBride – band photography, collages

== Charts ==
Chart (1999)	Peak position
US Billboard 200	135

=== "This Time" ===
Chart (1999)	Peak position
US Adult Alternative Airplay (Billboard)	9
