= Ride This – The Covers EP =

Ride This: The Covers EP

EP by Los Lobos
- Released: August 3, 2004
- Studio: CRG Studio, Rowland Heights, California; Jarvis Recording, New York City, New York; Indre Studios, Philadelphia, Pennsylvania; Room 601, Embassy Suites, Philadelphia, Pennsylvania
- Genre: Roots rock, Chicano rock, soul
- Length: 29:43
- Label: Hollywood
- Producer: Los Lobos

Los Lobos chronology
The Ride (2004)	Ride This: The Covers EP (2004)	Live at the Fillmore (2005)

Professional ratings
Review scores
Source	Rating
AllMusic	link
Rolling Stone	link

Ride This – The Covers EP is an EP by Los Lobos, released August 3, 2004 by Hollywood Records. It is a companion piece to the album The Ride, released three months earlier, which featured numerous guest musicians. On Ride This, Los Lobos covers songs by seven of these artists, namely Tom Waits, Bobby Womack, Elvis Costello, Rubén Blades, Richard Thompson, 1960s Chicano rock band Thee Midniters, and the Blasters.

== Reception ==
AllMusic rated the album three-and-a-half stars out of five, writing that "Los Lobos honor the spirit of the originals while putting their own spin on the material". Giving the same rating, Rolling Stone felt similarly, writing: "The band deftly rearranges the dynamics of each song ... the often exquisite results reveal new dimensions in every cut."

== Track listing ==
No.	Title	Writer(s)	Length
1.	"Jockey Full of Bourbon"	Tom Waits	3:29
2.	"More Than I Can Stand"	Bobby Womack, Darryl Carter	4:08
3.	"Uncomplicated"	Elvis Costello	5:12
4.	"Patria"	Rubén Blades	5:19
5.	"Shoot Out the Lights"	Richard Thompson	4:55
6.	"It'll Never Be Over for Me"	Sam Bobrick, Norm Blagman	3:44
7.	"Marie Marie" (live at the Aladdin Theater, Portland, Oregon, August 26, 1999)	Dave Alvin	2:56

== Personnel ==
Credits adapted from the EP liner notes.

Los Lobos

- David Hidalgo
- Louie Pérez
- Cesar Rosas
- Conrad Lozano
- Steve Berlin

Additional musicians

- Cougar Estrada – drums, percussion
- Victor Bisetti – percussion

Production

- Los Lobos – producer
- Robert Carranza – engineer (1, 2, 5, 6), mixing (1, 2, 5, 6)
- Dave McNair – engineer (3, 4), mixing(3, 4), mastering
- Michael Comstock – engineer (3, 4)
- Cesar Rosas – engineer (4)
- Dan Gale – engineer (7)
- Louie Perez – art direction
- Al Quattrocchi – art direction
- Jeff Smith – art direction
- Tornado Design – design, photography
- Max Aguilera-Hellweg – photography
