= La Pistola y El Corazón =

Studio album by Los Lobos
- Released: October 11, 1988
- Recorded: "Noon June 13 to Midnight June 17, 1988"
- Studios: Sunset Sound Factory, Los Angeles, California
- Genres: Chicano rock Tex-Mex; Conjunto; Mariachi; Ranchera; Son Jarocho
- Length: 25:04
- Labels: Slash, Warner Bros.
- Producer: Los Lobos

Los Lobos chronology
By the Light of the Moon (1987)	La Pistola y El Corazón (1988)	The Neighborhood (1990)

La Pistola y El Corazón (Spanish for "The Pistol and the Heart") is the fourth album by the Mexican American rock group Los Lobos, released in September 1988 on Slash/Warner Bros. Records. The mini-album is dedicated to Tejano/Mariachi folk music. It won a Grammy Award in 1989 for Best Mexican-American Performance.

The cover is a painting by East L.A. Chicano artist George Yepes, who conceived the image after listening to a demo of the album. "It is a perfect marriage between the musical and the visual," said band member Louie Pérez. "George’s painting directs you to the heart of the whole record. It has the same tough image as the music itself." The original painting was purchased by Warner Brothers Records and given to singer Madonna as a gift. Shortly afterwards, the painting was destroyed when a fire burned down a trailer inhabited by Sean Penn and Madonna. Yepes has created several other versions, including two in the Cheech Marin collection. The cover has won numerous awards and was, in 1999, selected as one of the 100 Best Album Covers of All Time by the editors of Rolling Stone Magazine.

== Reception ==
Professional ratings
Review scores
Source	Rating
AllMusic	3/5 stars
Rolling Stone Album Guide	3.5/5 stars
Spin Alternative Record Guide	6/10

Geoffrey Himes of The Washington Post was positive in his review of the album, saying that it finds Los Lobos "approaching the tunes not as nostalgia or folklorico but as confessional dramas requiring all the individual verve they can muster. The playing and singing is not only technically marvelous ... but also emotionally urgent." Himes added that the album "lacks the grand ambition of Los Lobos' best records, but it succeeds marvelously at what it sets out to do."

In a retrospective review, William Ruhlmann of AllMusic wrote, "If this is a band that seems to do too many things well, in a sense they are at their best when they narrow their focus, and they are certainly masters of their style here."

== Track listing ==
No.	Title	Writer(s)	Length
1.	"La Guacamaya"	Traditional	2:05
2.	"Las Amarillas"	Traditional	3:04
3.	"Si Yo Quisiera"	Romualdo Garcia	2:42
4.	"(Sonajas) Mañanitas Michoacanas"	Yolanda Patricia Ayala	2:23
5.	"Estoy Sentado Aquí"	Cesar Rosas	2:28
6.	"El Gusto"	Elpidio Ramírez	2:58
7.	"Que Nadie Sepa Mi Sufrir"	Ángel Cabral, Enrique Dizeo	2:30
8.	"El Canelo"	Jacinto Gatica	3:27
9.	"La Pistola y El Corazón"	David Hidalgo, Louie Pérez	3:27

== Personnel ==
Los Lobos

- David Hidalgo – requinto jarocho (1, 8), vocals (1, 3, 8), violin (2, 4, 6), accordion (3, 5, 9), guitar (5, 7), lead vocals (6, 9), huapanguera (8)
- Cesar Rosas – lead vocals (1, 2, 3, 5, 7, 8), guitar (1, 4, 5, 7, 8), huapanguera (2, 6, 9), bajo sexto (3), vocals (6)
- Louie Pérez – jarana (1, 4, 6, 8, 9), vocals (1, 6, 8), snare drum (2, 3), vihuela (5), brushes (7)
- Conrad Lozano – guitarron (1, 2, 4, 5, 6, 9), vocals (1), tololoche (3, 7, 8)
- Steve Berlin – soprano saxophone (3, 5, 9)

Additional musicians

- Mouse – bells (2)
- The Lost Tribe Percussion Ensemble – sonajas (4)

Production

- Los Lobos – producer
- Larry Hirsch – engineer, mixing
- Scott Woodman – engineer
- Stephen Marcussen – mastering
- George Yepes – cover, design
- Louie Pérez – cover, cover concept
- Jeri Heiden – art direction

== Charts ==
Chart (1988)	Peak position
Finnish Albums (The Official Finnish Charts)	34
US Billboard 200	179
US Regional Mexican Albums (Billboard)	22

== Accolades ==
=== Grammy Awards ===
Award	Year
Best Mexican-American/Tejano Music Performance	1989
