= Papa's Dream =

1995 studio children's album by Los Lobos with Lalo Guerrero

Studio album by Los Lobos with Lalo Guerrero
- Released: February 14, 1995
- Studio: CRG Studio, Rowland Heights, California; Banquet Sound Studios, Sebastopol; Komotion International, San Francisco, California
- Genre: Children's music
- Length: 51:07
- Label: Music For Little People
- Producer: Los Lobos, Eugene Rodriguez, Leib Ostrow

Los Lobos with Lalo Guerrero chronology
Just Another Band from East L.A. – A Collection (1993)	Papa's Dream (1995)	Colossal Head (1996)

Professional ratings
Review scores
Source	Rating
AllMusic	3/5 stars
Entertainment Weekly	B+

Papa's Dream is a children's album by Los Lobos with Lalo Guerrero, released in 1995 through Music for Little People/Warner Bros. It features, among others, the Children's Coro of Los Cenzontles Musical Arts Center of San Pablo, California.

== Track listing ==
No.	Title	Writer(s)	Length
1.	"La Bamba"	Traditional / Eugene Rodriguez, Gilberto Gutierrez (additional lyrics)	3:05
3.	"Wooly Bully"	Domingo Samudio	3:18
5.	"Buzz, Buzz, Buzz"	John Gray, Bobby Day	2:34
7.	"Route 90"	Clarence Garlow, Leon René / Lalo Guerrero (new lyrics)	3:06
9.	"Corrido For Papa Lalo"	Traditional / Phillip Rodriguez (lyrics)	2:53
11.	"La Bicicleta"	Traditional	0:50
13.	"Cielito Lindo"	Traditional / E. Rodriguez, Gutierrez, Guerrero (new lyrics)	2:45
16.	"La Mañanita Alegre"	Traditional / E. Rodriguez, Gutierrez (new lyrics)	2:37
18.	"El Pato"	Traditional / E. Rodriguez (English lyrics)	2:27
20.	"De Colores"	Traditional / Guerrero (additional lyrics)	2:24
22.	"La Mañanitas Tapatias"	Traditional / Guerrero (English lyrics)	2:44
24.	"La Piñata"	Traditional / E. Rodriguez (new lyrics)	0:39
26.	"La, La, La"	Clarence Paul	3:16
28.	"La Bamba"	Traditional / E. Rodriguez, Gutierrez (new lyrics)	2:46
30.	"Wooly Bully Banda (Reprise)"	Samudio	1:03

Note

Even numbered tracks 2–14 and odd numbered tracks 15–31 are untitled and narration only.

== Personnel ==
Los Lobos with Lalo Guerrero

- David Hidalgo – guitar, vocals, accordion, violin, drums, hidalgarron, requinto jarocho, guitarrón jarocho
- Cesar Rosas – vocals, guitar, vihuela jarana
- Conrad Lozano – bass, guitarrón
- Louie Pérez – drums, jarana
- Steve Berlin – saxophone, keyboards
- Lalo Guerrero – narration, vocals, lead vocals (13, 20)

Additional musicians

- Victor Bisetti – percussion
- Gilberto Gutierrez – jarana, mosquito, zapateado (1)
- Jimmy Durchslag – trombone (26)
- Mark Guerrero – backing vocals (28)
- Hugo Arroyo – vocals (18, 28)
- Anne Danzer – vocals (26)
- Victoria Fernandez-McRorie – narration
- Herman Obregon – narration, backing vocals (22)
- Carmen Navarro – narration
- Fauna Dillon-Ostrow – narration
- Iona Dillon-Ostrow – narration
- Johanna Perez – narration
- Kai Ostrow – narration
- Nancy Esteva – narration
- Walter Emilio Perez – narration
- Los Cenzontles Children's Coro – vocals
- Eugene Rodriguez – choir conductor, backing vocals (3, 28)

Production

- Los Lobos – producer
- Eugene Rodriguez – producer
- Leib Ostrow – producer
- David Wells – engineer
- Cesar Rosas – engineer, mixing
- Phred Cirillo – engineer
- Michael Prince – mixing
- Warren Dennis – mixing, mastering
- Chip Dunbar – mastering
- Jim Fulton – narration assembly
- Tanya Mayo – narration coordinator
- Al Carlos Hernandez – story creation, writing
- Phillip Rodriguez – story creation, writing
- Sandy Bassett – art direction, design
- Rafael Lopez – illustration
