= Kiko (album) =

Studio album by Los Lobos
- Released: May 26, 1992
- Recorded: Sound Factory West Studio
- Genres: Art rock; Chicano rock; roots rock; Tex-Mex; Americana; psychedelic rock
- Length: 52:29
- Labels: Slash, Warner Bros.
- Producers: Mitchell Froom, Los Lobos

Los Lobos chronology
The Neighborhood (1990)	Kiko (1992)	Just Another Band From East L.A. - A Collection (1993)

Singles from Kiko
- 1. "Reva's House" Released: 1992; 2. "Kiko and the Lavender Moon" Released: 1992

Professional ratings
Review scores
Source	Rating
AllMusic	4.5/5 stars
Calgary Herald	A−
Encyclopedia of Popular Music	4/5 stars
Entertainment Weekly	B
Los Angeles Times	4/4 stars
Orlando Sentinel	5/5 stars
Q	4/5 stars
Rolling Stone	4/5 stars
The Rolling Stone Album Guide	5/5 stars
Spin Alternative Record Guide	8/10
Uncut	10/10

Kiko is the sixth album by the Mexican American rock group Los Lobos. With the exception of La Bamba's 2 million units sold, Kiko sold more units (vinyl, CDs, cassettes) than any other album in their 46 year career of original songs. Roughly 450,000 units were sold worldwide.

A year after the album's release, Los Lobos performed a version of the song "Kiko and the Lavender Moon," as "Elmo and the Lavender Moon," on the PBS series Sesame Street.

== Track listing ==
All songs written by David Hidalgo and Louie Pérez except where noted.

1. "Dream In Blue" – 3:34
2. "Wake Up Dolores" – 2:55
3. "Angels with Dirty Faces" – 4:02
4. "That Train Don't Stop Here" (Cesar Rosas, Leroy Preston) – 3:52
5. "Kiko and the Lavender Moon" – 3:35
6. "Saint Behind The Glass" – 3:17
7. "Reva's House" – 3:04
8. "When the Circus Comes" – 3:16
9. "Arizona Skies" – 2:45
10. "Short Side of Nothing" – 2:57
11. "Two Janes" – 3:53
12. "Wicked Rain" (Cesar Rosas) – 3:04
13. "Whiskey Trail" – 2:41
14. "Just a Man" – 3:40
15. "Peace" – 3:55
16. "Rio de Tenampa" – 1:59

== Personnel ==
- Steve Berlin - tenor, baritone, and soprano sax, flute, melodica, harmonica, organ, piano, synthesizer, percussion
- David Hidalgo - guitars, accordion, violin, banjo, piano, percussion, vocals
- Conrad Lozano - Fender 5-string jazz bass and 4-string precision bass, Godin fretless bass, guitarron, background vocals
- Louie Pérez - drums, vocals, guitars, percussion
- Cesar Rosas - electric and acoustic guitars, vocals
- Pete Thomas - drums
- Victor Bisetti - drums (15, 16), percussion
- Fermin Herrera - Veracruz harp (6)
- Alex Acuña - percussion
- Gary Mallaber - drums (2)
- Mitchell Froom and his House of Keyboards La Chilapeña brass band
- Tchad Blake - recording and mixing engineer

== Charts ==
Chart (1992)	Peak position
US Billboard 200	143

=== "Reva's House" ===
Chart (1992)	Peak position
US Alternative Airplay (Billboard)	24

== 20th Anniversary Edition ==
In August 2012 Shout! Factory released a 20th Anniversary Edition of the album complete with 5 bonus tracks. Along with the re-issue, a full length concert recorded in 2006 at the House of Blues, San Diego titled Kiko Live was released on DVD, Blu-ray, and CD.
