= Tin Can Trust =

Studio album by Los Lobos
- Released: August 3, 2010
- Studios: Manny's Estudio, East Los Angeles, California; Eagle Audio Recording, Fort Worth, Texas; Mission Bells, San Francisco, California; John Macy Sound, Denver, Colorado; Hinge Sound, Chicago, Illinois; Red Star Recording, Los Angeles, California; Milagro Studios, Walnut, California
- Genres: Chicano rock Blues rock Americana; Tex-Mex
- Length: 47:23
- Label: Shout! Factory
- Producer: Los Lobos

Los Lobos chronology
Los Lobos Goes Disney (2009)	Tin Can Trust (2010)	Disconnected in New York City (2013)

Professional ratings
Aggregate scores
Source	Rating
Metacritic	76/100
Review scores
Source	Rating
Allmusic	4/5 stars
Los Angeles Times	3/4 stars
Popmatters	8/10 stars
Rolling Stone	3/5 stars

Tin Can Trust is a 2010 album by the band Los Lobos, and is the band's first collection of new original material since 2006. It features rock 'n' roll, blues, two Spanish language tracks, and a Grateful Dead cover song. The album was nominated for a Grammy Award for Best Americana Album.

== Track listing ==
All tracks are written by David Hidalgo and Louie Perez, except where noted.

No.	Title	Writer(s)	Length
1.	"Burn It Down"		5:11
2.	"On Main Street"		3:16
3.	"Yo Canto"	Cesar Rosas	2:59
4.	"Tin Can Trust"		4:34
5.	"Jupiter Or The Moon"		4:22
6.	"Do the Murray"	Hidalgo	3:35
7.	"All My Bridges Burning"	Rosas, Robert Hunter	4:51
8.	"West L.A. Fadeaway" (Grateful Dead cover)	Jerry Garcia, Hunter	7:03
9.	"The Lady And The Rose"		4:10
10.	"Mujer Ingrata"	Rosas	2:45
11.	"27 Spanishes"		4:37

== Personnel ==
Instrumentation for Los Lobos is unspecified on the album, but this is the usual:

- David Hidalgo – vocals, guitar, accordion, fiddle, requinto jarocho
- Louie Pérez – vocals, guitar, drums, jarana
- Cesar Rosas – vocals, guitar, bajo sexto
- Conrad Lozano – vocals, bass, guitarron
- Steve Berlin – keyboards, woodwinds

Additional musicians

Credits adapted from the album's liner notes.

- Cougar Estrada – drums, percussion
- Susan Tedeschi – backing vocals (1)
- Rev. Charles Williams – keyboards (3, 7)

Technical

- Los Lobos – producer
- Shane Smith – engineer, mixing (3, 7)
- John Macy – engineer
- Dave Simon-Baker – engineer
- Jeff Ward – engineer
- Steve Weeder – engineer
- David Kalish – assistant engineer
- Nick Sullivan – assistant engineer
- Dave McNair – mixing (except 3, 7), mastering
- Cesar Rosas – mixing (3, 7)
- Louie Perez – art direction, photography
- Al Quattrocchi – art direction, photography
- Jeff Smith – art direction
- Tornado Design – design
- Drew Reynolds – photography
- Derek Dressler – A&R
- Robert Kim – project assistant
- Dave McIntosh – music business affairs

== Charts ==
Chart (2010)	Peak position
Dutch Albums (Album Top 100)	94
UK Independent Albums (Official Charts)	20
US Billboard 200	47
US Top Rock Albums (Billboard)	17
