= Colossal Head =

Studio album by Los Lobos
- Released: March 19, 1996
- Studio: Sunset Sound Factory, Los Angeles, California
- Genre: Funk rock, roots rock, avant-pop, Latino rock, blues rock
- Length: 42:55
- Label: Warner Bros.
- Producer: Mitchell Froom, Tchad Blake, Los Lobos

Los Lobos chronology
Papa's Dream (1995)	Colossal Head (1996)	This Time (1999)

Professional ratings
Review scores
Source	Rating
AllMusic	3/5 stars
Chicago Tribune	3/4 stars
Entertainment Weekly	B−
The Guardian	4/5 stars
Los Angeles Times	3.5/4 stars
Rolling Stone	2/5 stars
The Rolling Stone Album Guide	3.5/5 stars
Spin	8/10
The Village Voice	A

Colossal Head is the eighth studio album by the rock band Los Lobos. It was released in 1996 on Warner Bros. Records. The cover depicts Big Loo, a toy originally created by Louis Marx and Company in the 1960s.

== Track listing ==
No.	Title	Writer(s)	Length
1.	"Revolution"	David Hidalgo, Louie Pérez	3:10
2.	"Mas y Mas"	Hidalgo, Pérez	4:44
3.	"Maricela"	Cesar Rosas	3:51
4.	"Everybody Loves a Train"	Hidalgo, Pérez	3:30
5.	"Can't Stop the Rain"	Rosas	3:36
6.	"Life Is Good"	Hidalgo, Pérez	4:08
7.	"Little Japan"	Rosas, Pérez	5:09
8.	"Manny's Bones"	Hidalgo, Pérez	3:24
9.	"Colossal Head"	Hidalgo, Pérez	4:13
10.	"This Bird's Gonna Fly"	Rosas	4:18
11.	"Buddy Ebsen Loves the Night Time"	Hidalgo	2:57

== Personnel ==
Los Lobos

- David Hidalgo – vocals, guitar, accordion, fiddle, requinto jarocho
- Louie Pérez – vocals, guitar, drums, jarana
- Cesar Rosas – vocals, guitar, bajo sexto
- Conrad Lozano – vocals, bass, guitarron
- Steve Berlin – keyboards, horns

Additional musicians

- Victor Bisetti – drums, percussion
- Pete Thomas – drums
- Efrain Toro – percussion
- Yuka Honda – keyboards, samples

Production

- Mitchell Froom – producer
- Tchad Blake – producer, engineer
- Los Lobos – producer
- John Paterno – engineer
- Tom Recchion – art direction, design
- Jim Douglas – photographer

== Charts ==
Chart (1996)	Peak position
US Billboard 200	81

"Can't Stop the Rain"

Chart (1996)	Peak position
US Adult Alternative Airplay (Billboard)	12
