= ...And a Time to Dance =

EP by Los Lobos
- Released: 1983
- Recorded: 1983, Warner Bros. Studios, North Hollywood; Enactron, Burbank
- Genres: Tex-Mex, Rock en Español, Chicano rock, roots rock
- Labels: Slash, Rough Trade
- Producers: T-Bone Burnett, Steve Berlin

Los Lobos chronology
Los Lobos Del Este De Los Angeles (1978)	...And a Time to Dance (1983)	How Will the Wolf Survive? (1984)

Professional ratings
Review scores
Source	Rating
AllMusic	3.5/5 stars
Robert Christgau	A−
Rolling Stone	4/5 stars
Rolling Stone Album Guide	3.5/5 stars
Spin Alternative Record Guide	8/10

...And a Time to Dance is a 1983 EP by Los Lobos. It was co-produced by T-Bone Burnett and Steve Berlin (not yet a full-time member of the band) and was the band's first release on Slash Records. The EP brought the band its first wide acclaim. It was voted best EP of the year in the Village Voice's influential Pazz & Jop critics poll. Critic Robert Christgau gave the record an "A−" in his Consumer Guide, calling it "good old rock and roll East L.A. style." Trouser Press raved about "a spicy romp (in two languages) back and forth across musical borders few can traverse with such ease," while Rolling Stone called it "an infectious dance record that deserves to be heard by rock fans."

The track "Anselma" won the first Grammy Award for Best Mexican-American Performance. The album was mixed and recorded entirely digitally.

== Track listing ==
Side One
No.	Title	Writer(s)	Length
1.	"Let's Say Goodnight"	David Hidalgo, Louie Pérez	2:30
2.	"Walking Song"	David Hidalgo, Louie Pérez	2:45
3.	"Anselma"	Cesar Suedan, Guadalupe Trigo	3:04

Side Two
No.	Title	Writer(s)	Length
4.	"Come On Let's Go"	Ritchie Valens	2:08
5.	"How Much Can I Do?"	David Hidalgo, Louie Pérez	2:34
6.	"Why Do You Do"	Cesar Rosas	2:17
7.	"Ay Te Dejo En San Antonio"	Don Santiago Jimenez	2:31

== Personnel ==
- David Hidalgo – guitar, accordion, vocals
- Cesar Rosas – guitar, bajo sexto, vocals
- Louie Pérez – drums, vocals
- Conrad Lozano – bass, vocals, guitarrón

=== Additional personnel ===
- Steve Berlin – saxophones, production
- T-Bone Burnett – production
- Recorded and mixed by Mark Linett
