= How Will the Wolf Survive? =

Studio album by Los Lobos
- Released: October 1984
- Genres: Rock and roll; Tejano music
- Length: 33:11
- Label: Slash/Warner Bros.
- Producers: T-Bone Burnett, Steve Berlin

Los Lobos chronology
...And a Time to Dance (1983)	How Will the Wolf Survive? (1984)	By the Light of the Moon (1987)

Singles from How Will the Wolf Survive?
- 1. "Will the Wolf Survive?" Released: 1984

How Will the Wolf Survive? is the major label debut album by Los Lobos, released in October 1984.

In 1989, How Will the Wolf Survive? was ranked at number 30 on Rolling Stone magazine's list of the 100 greatest albums of the 1980s. It was ranked at number 461 on the magazine's 2003 list of the 500 greatest albums of all time, and also placed on updates of the list in 2012 (at number 455) and 2020 (at number 431).

== Background ==
Though they had performed together around Los Angeles for over a decade, Los Lobos had previously released only one full-length album, the self-produced Los Lobos del Este de Los Angeles, in 1977. In 1983, they released an extended play entitled ...And a Time to Dance, which was well-received by critics, but only sold about 50,000 copies. However, the sales of the EP earned the band enough money to purchase a Dodge van, enabling them to tour throughout the United States for the first time. Los Lobos began composing How Will the Wolf Survive? at the home of drummer Louie Pérez's brother-in-law, a time in which several songs, including "A Matter of Time", were written. Pérez explained, "We'd sit down with a guitar, a tape recorder and a jar of Taster's Choice, and we were coffee achievers all afternoon."

The album's title and the song "Will the Wolf Survive?" were inspired by a National Geographic article entitled "Where Can the Wolf Survive", which the band members related to their own struggle to gain success in the United States while maintaining their Mexican roots. Pérez recalled, "It was like our group, our story: What is this beast, this animal that the record companies can't figure out? Will we be given the opportunity to make it or not?"

== Music ==
On How Will the Wolf Survive?, Los Lobos experimented with various genres, including styles reflective of the group's traditional Mexican roots. "I Got Loaded" features influences of R&B, while "A Matter of Time" blends country and blues sensibilities.

Both "A Matter of Time" and "Will the Wolf Survive?" discuss the lives of immigrants in the United States. "A Matter of Time" is about a Mexican crossing the border in search of a better life.

== Chart performance ==
In the United States, How Will the Wolf Survive? spent 34 weeks on the Billboard 200 albums chart, reaching its peak position of number 47 in early March 1985.

== Critical reception ==
Professional ratings
Review scores
Source	Rating
AllMusic	4.5/5 stars
The Boston Phoenix	4/4 stars
CD Review	4/5 stars
Daily News	3.5/4 stars
Orlando Sentinel	5/5 stars
Rolling Stone	4/5 stars
The Rolling Stone Album Guide	4/5 stars
Spin Alternative Record Guide	9/10
Tallahassee Democrat	5/5 stars
The Village Voice	A

Critical reaction to the album was favorable. Robert Christgau of The Village Voice praised the group's originality: "Their debut LP makes it sound as if they invented the style. Who did the original of that one, you wonder, only to discover that you're listening to the original." Mark Deming's retrospective review for AllMusic gushed, "While rarely flashy, even a casual listen offers all the proof you might need that Los Lobos were a band of world-class musicians, with David Hidalgo's guitar work especially impressive throughout."

== Track listing ==
No.	Title	Writer(s)	Length
1.	"Don't Worry Baby"	Cesar Rosas, Louie Pérez, T-Bone Burnett	2:43
2.	"A Matter of Time"	David Hidalgo, Pérez	3:55
3.	"Corrido #1"	Rosas	2:42
4.	"Our Last Night"	Hidalgo, Pérez	3:08
5.	"The Breakdown"	Hidalgo, Pérez, Burnett	4:12
6.	"I Got Loaded"	Camille Bob	3:20
7.	"Serenata Norteña"		2:53
8.	"Evangeline"	Hidalgo, Pérez	2:43
9.	"I Got to Let You Know"	Rosas	2:35
10.	"Lil' King of Everything"	Hidalgo, Pérez	1:19
11.	"Will the Wolf Survive?"	Hidalgo, Pérez	3:41
Total length:			33:11

== Personnel ==
- Steve Berlin – saxophones, percussion
- David Hidalgo – lead vocals, guitar, accordion, lap steel, percussion
- Conrad Lozano – vocals, bass, guitarrón
- Louie Pérez – vocals, drums, bajo quinto
- Cesar Rosas – lead vocals, guitar, bajo sexto, mandolin

=== Additional personnel ===
- Alex Acuña – percussion
- T-Bone Burnett – acoustic guitar, organ

== Charts ==
Chart (1985)	Peak position
Canada Top Albums/CDs (RPM)	31
New Zealand Albums (RMNZ)	13
UK Albums (Official Charts)	77
US Billboard 200	47

=== "Will the Wolf Survive?" ===
Chart (1985)	Peak position
US Billboard Hot 100	78
US Mainstream Rock (Billboard)	26

=== "Don't Worry Baby" ===
Chart (1984–1985)	Peak position
US Mainstream Rock (Billboard)	28
