= The Neighborhood (album) =

1990 studio album by Los Lobos with contributions from several musicians

Studio album by Los Lobos
- Released: September 4, 1990
- Studios: Ocean Way, Los Angeles, California; Sunset Sound, Hollywood, California
- Genres: Chicano rock, blues rock
- Length: 44:52
- Labels: Slash, Warner Bros.
- Producers: Larry Hirsch, Los Lobos

Los Lobos chronology
La pistola y el corazón (1988)	The Neighborhood (1990)	Kiko (1992)

The Neighborhood is the fifth album by the Chicano rock band Los Lobos. It was released in 1990 and includes contributions from Levon Helm and John Hiatt, among others.

The album peaked at No. 103 on the Billboard 200 in September 1990.

== Production ==
The album followed a period of writer's block, brought on by the success of "La Bamba," and a confusion about what musical direction to go in. The New York Times noted a more prominent blues influence, "in different moods and textures." Some tracks employed session drummers in place of Louie F. Pérez, Jr.

== Critical reception ==
Professional ratings
Review scores
Source	Rating
AllMusic	4/5 stars
Chicago Sun-Times	3.5/4 stars
Chicago Tribune	4/4 stars
Entertainment Weekly	B+
Los Angeles Times	3.5/5 stars
NME	7/10
Orlando Sentinel	4/5 stars
Rolling Stone	4/5 stars
The Rolling Stone Album Guide	4/5 stars
Spin Alternative Record Guide	7/10

Reviewing The Neighborhood for the Chicago Tribune, Greg Kot said that Los Lobos had "translated" their mastery of blues, country, R&B and Mexican folk "into 13 songs of startling simplicity and power", describing the album as "East L.A. soul music, played and sung with utter conviction." Chicago Sun-Times critic Don McLeese stated that it "confirms that the music of Los Lobos has deeper dimensions than the good-time revivalism of 'La Bamba'"; in Rolling Stone, McLeese noted the album's "simplicity and understatement" and summarized it as "a bringing-it-all-back-home affair" which "finds a spiritual dimension, a sense of wonder in the course of everyday life." For The Washington Post, Geoffrey Himes wrote that "the album is a bold claim by these second-generation immigrants that they are Americans, and that all of America's culture belongs to them." Ira Robbins of Entertainment Weekly lauded the band's musical versatility and concluded that "despite the disconcerting lack of focus, what's in this musical melting pot is mighty tasty."

Los Angeles Times journalist Chris Willman credited Los Lobos with maintaining their "edge" throughout The Neighborhood, even in moments that "are so outrightly sentimental that they would be sheer Capra-corn in almost any other group's hands". While finding the band's songwriting not at par with "their stylistic mastery", Gavin Martin of NME deemed the album "Los Lobos' most successful collection to date". Critic Robert Christgau, however, gave it a grade of "neither".

Retrospectively, AllMusic's Mark Deming called The Neighborhood "a genuine step forward for a great band, as well as the jumping-off point to their most experimental period." In The Rolling Stone Album Guide, J. D. Considine commented that the album showed Los Lobos sounding "reinvigorated" and "stronger than ever" with material that played to the band's musical strengths. Trouser Press praised it as "exciting, evocative and highly satisfying."

== Track listing ==
All songs written by David K. Hidalgo and Louie F. Pérez, Jr., except where noted.

No.	Title	Writer(s)	Length
1.	"Down on the Riverbed"		4:05
2.	"Emily"		3:49
3.	"I Walk Alone"		3:00
4.	"Angel Dance"		3:13
5.	"Little John of God"		2:19
6.	"Deep Dark Hole"		2:24
7.	"Georgia Slop"	(Jimmy McCracklin)	2:45
8.	"I Can't Understand"	(Cesar J. Rosas, Willie Dixon)	4:00
9.	"The Giving Tree"		3:07
10.	"Take My Hand"		4:45
11.	"Jenny's Got a Pony"		4:03
12.	"Be Still"		3:34
13.	"The Neighborhood"		4:07

== Personnel ==
- David K. Hidalgo - vocals, electric and acoustic guitars, 6-string bass, tiple, accordion, bajo sexto, violine, Hawaiian steel, koto guitar, drums, percussion
- Cesar J. Rosas - vocals, electric and acoustic guitars, bajo-sexto, huapanguera
- Louie F. Pérez, Jr. - drums, percussion, guitars, jarana, hidalguer
- Conrad R. Lozano - vocals, fender precision and 5-string bass, guitarron, upright bass
- Steve M. Berlin - tenor, baritone and soprano saxophones, organ, clavinet, percussion

Additional personnel

- Jerry Marotta - drums (track 1, 3)
- Danny Timms - organ, wurlitzer, piano (track 1, 12)
- Alex Acuña - percussion, shekere, hand drums (track 1, 3, 4)
- John Hiatt - vocals (track 1, 10)
- Jim Keltner - drums, percussion (track 2, 6, 9, 10, 11, 12, 13)
- Levon Helm - vocals, mandolin (track 2, 5)
- Mitchell Froom - harmonium (track 4)

Production

- Larry Hirsch - producer, engineer, mixing
- Los Lobos - producer
- Mitchell Froom - producer (track 4)
- Clark Germain - engineer
- Stacy Baird - engineer
- Brian Soucy - assistant engineer
- Dan Bosworth - assistant engineer
- Eric Rudd - assistant engineer
- Joe Schiff - assistant engineer
- Neal Avron - assistant engineer
- Tom Nellen - assistant engineer
- Tchad Blake - engineer (track 4)
- Julie Last - assistant engineer (track 4)
- Stephen Marcussen - mastering
- Terry Robertson-Mota - art direction, design
- Louie Perez - art visions
- Carlos Almaraz - paintings
- Max Aguilera-Hellweg - photography

== Charts ==
Chart (1990–1991)	Peak position
Canada Top Albums/CDs (RPM)	51
Dutch Albums (Album Top 100)	88
New Zealand Albums (RMNZ)	44
Swiss Albums (Schweizer Hitparade)	38
US Billboard 200	103

"Down on the Riverbed"

Chart (1990)	Peak position
US Mainstream Rock (Billboard)	33
US Alternative Airplay (Billboard)	16
