= Sí Se Puede! =

Studio album by Various
- Released: March 1977
- Recorded: January–February 1977
- Studio: A&M (Hollywood, California)
- Genre: Tejano, Norteño
- Length: 34:09
- Label: Pan American Ent.
- Producer: Art P. Brambila

Professional ratings
Review scores
Source	Rating
AllMusic	3.5/5 stars

Sí Se Puede! (Spanish for "Yes We Can!") is a 1977 various artists charity album featuring Los Lobos and various vocalists, including the Salas Brothers of the band Tierra. Proceeds from the album went towards the United Farm Workers of America. "Sí, se puede" is the motto of the United Farm Workers of America.

== Background ==
In 1976, Art Brambila, a television and music producer from Los Angeles, was looking for a sponsor for his new Latin music television show, The Mean Salsa Machine. He had heard that Cesar Chavez, president of the United Farm Workers, had a relationship with Coca-Cola and asked him for help to secure a deal with the company. When Chavez succeeded in getting the sponsorship for the show, Brambila wanted to repay him. Brambila decided to put together an album of songs honoring Chavez and the United Farm Workers, and chose Los Lobos, then a local Mexican folk combo called Los Lobos Del Este De Los Angeles, to be the backing band for the project. They would accompany a variety of vocalists performing songs celebrating Chavez's accomplishments and the struggle of farm workers.

Vocalists Carmen Moreno from Fresno, Geri Gonzales of East L.A., the Salas brothers of Lincoln Heights, Ramon "Tiguere" Rodriguez from Phoenix, Brambila's brother Raul, and the Santa Isabel School Choir from East Los Angeles were selected to participate. Herb Alpert, President of A&M Records, donated studio time and, in January 1977, Brambila assembled the musicians at A&M’s studio in Los Angeles to record the album. In March 1977, the United Farm Workers Union was presented with 5,000 copies of the album. "I could utilize the talents of many local artists I’d worked with in my earlier years as a record producer and the union could sell [the album] at rallies, marches, and huelgas", Brambila recalled.

== Reissues ==
The album has been reissued on CD in 1994 and 2005 by Brown Bag Records and digitally in 2014 by Fantasy.

== Track listing ==
No.	Title	Writer(s)	Length
1.	"De Colores"	Traditional	5:10
2.	"Huelga en General"	Luis Valdez, Baldemar Gomez	3:14
3.	"Yo Estoy Con Chavez"	Ramon "Tiguere" Rodriguez	2:30
4.	"Mujeres Valientes"	Miguel Francisco Barragan	2:20
5.	"Mañana Is Now"	Art P. Brambila	3:20
6.	"Telingo Lingo"	Traditional	1:50
7.	"Corrido de Dolores Huerta #39"	Carmen Moreno	4:00
8.	"Chicanita de Aztlán"	Rodriguez	4:20
9.	"Sangre Antigua"	Moreno	4:25
10.	"No Nos Moverán"	Traditional, spanish lyrics by Juanita M. Domínguez, Brambila	3:00

== Personnel ==
Credits adapted from the album's liner notes.

Vocalists

- Alfonso Tafoya – spoken word introduction (1)
- Children from the School of Santa Isabel, East Los Angeles – vocals (1)
- Carmen Moreno – vocals (2, 7, 9, 10)
- Steve Salas – vocals (2, 10), background vocals
- Ramon "Tiguere" Rodriguez – vocals (3)
- Raul Brambila – vocals (4)
- Geri Gonzáles Logan – vocals (5, 10)
- Diana Cruz – vocals (8)
- Rudy Salas – vocals (10), background vocals

Los Lobos Del Este De Los Angeles

- David Hidalgo – guitar, requinto jarocho, mandola, violin, background vocals, arrangements
- Cesar Rosas – guitar, mandolin, background vocals, vocals (6), arrangements
- Louie Pérez – charango, vihuela, guitar, requinto romantico, palitos, arrangements
- Conrad R. Lozano – guitarron, upright bass, background vocals, vocals (10), arrangements
- Frank Gonzáles – harp, mandolin, guitar, harmonica, background vocals, arrangements

Additional musicians

- Mark Fogelquist – violin
- Rudy "Bub" Villa – flute
- Arturo Gertz – harp

Production

- Art P. Brambila – producer, cover concept, design
- Steve Katz – engineer
- Ellis Sorkin – engineer
- Ed Thacker – engineer
- Carol Lee Dewey – photography
- Allan M. Galvan – photography
- Rod Dyer – graphics
- Cesar E. Chavez – liner notes
- Philip Sonnichsen – musical consultant
