= Live at the Fillmore (Los Lobos album) =

Live album by Los Lobos
- Released: March 15, 2005
- Recorded: Fillmore Auditorium, San Francisco, July 29 and 30, 2004
- Genre: Roots rock Chicano Rock
- Length: 70:49
- Label: Hollywood/Mammoth
- Producer: Los Lobos

Los Lobos chronology
Ride This - The Covers EP (2004)	Live at the Fillmore (2005)	Acoustic en Vivo (2005)

Professional ratings
Review scores
Source	Rating
Allmusic	4/5 stars

Live at the Fillmore, is the first live album by American group Los Lobos. It was recorded 29th and 30 July 2004 at The Fillmore Auditorium in San Francisco. The concert was also filmed and issued as a concert-DVD with the same title with slightly different set-list.

== Track listing ==
1. "Good Morning Aztlán" (David Hidalgo, Louie Pérez) – 4:32
2. "I Walk Alone" (David Hidalgo, Louie Pérez) – 3:47
3. "Maria Christina" (Cesar Rosas) – 3:36
4. "Charmed" (David Hidalgo, Louie Pérez) – 5:45
5. "Luz De Mi Vida" (Cesar Rosas, Louie Pérez) – 4:11
6. "Rita"(David Hidalgo, Louie Pérez) – 5:31
7. "The Neighborhood" (David Hidalgo, Louie Pérez) – 7:47
8. "Maricela" (Cesar Rosas) – 4:33
9. "Tears of God" (David Hidalgo, Louie Pérez) – 4:50
10. "Viking" (David Hidalgo, Louie Pérez) – 4:40
11. "How Much Can I Do?" (David Hidalgo, Louie Pérez) – 3:26
12. "Kiko and the Lavender Moon" (David Hidalgo, Louie Pérez) – 3:37
13. "Cumbia Raza" (Cesar Rosas) – 9:09
14. "What's Going On" (Renaldo Benson, Alfred Cleveland, Marvin Gaye) – 5:25

=== Bonus Disc (acoustic) ===
1. "Saint Behind the Glass" (David Hidalgo, Louie Pérez) - 3:28
2. "Maricela" (Cesar Rosas) - 4:00
3. "Guantanamera" (José Fernández Diaz) - 5:00
