= By the Light of the Moon (album) =

Studio album by Los Lobos
- Released: January 19, 1987
- Studios: Sunset Sound, Los Angeles, California
- Genre: Rock and roll
- Length: 40:29
- Labels: Slash, Warner Bros.
- Producers: T-Bone Burnett, Los Lobos

Los Lobos chronology
How Will the Wolf Survive? (1984)	By the Light of the Moon (1987)	La Pistola y El Corazón (1988)

Singles from By the Light of the Moon
- 1. "Shakin' Shakin' Shakes" Released: 1987; 2. "Set Me Free (Rosa Lee)" Released: 1987

By the Light of the Moon is the third album by the Mexican American rock group Los Lobos, released in 1987.

== Critical reception ==
Professional ratings
Review scores
Source	Rating
AllMusic	4/5 stars
The Encyclopedia of Popular Music	4/5 stars
Orlando Sentinel	4/5 stars
The Rolling Stone Album Guide	2.5/5 stars
Spin Alternative Record Guide	8/10
The Village Voice	A−

The Chicago Tribune wrote that "not since Bruce Springsteen's Nebraska has a rock-and-roll album taken such a brutally frank look at the betrayals of the American Dream."

== Track listing ==
No.	Title	Writer(s)	Length
1.	"One Time One Night"	Hidalgo, Pérez	4:48
2.	"Shakin' Shakin' Shakes"	Rosas, Burnett	4:13
3.	"Is This All There Is?"	Hidalgo, Pérez	4:00
4.	"Prenda Del Alma"	traditional	3:21
5.	"All I Wanted to Do Was Dance"	Hidalgo, Pérez, Burnett	3:57
6.	"Set Me Free (Rosa Lee)"	Rosas	3:35
7.	"The Hardest Time"	Hidalgo, Pérez	3:12
8.	"My Baby's Gone"	Rosas	3:41
9.	"River of Fools"	Hidalgo, Pérez	2:55
10.	"The Mess We're In"	Hidalgo, Pérez	3:01
11.	"Tears of God"	Hidalgo, Pérez	3:46
Total length:			40:29

== Credits ==
Writing, performance and production credits are adapted from the album liner notes.

=== Personnel ===
Los Lobos

- David Hidalgo – lead vocals, guitars, accordion, six-string bass, lap steel, violin, hidalguera, percussion
- Cesar Rosas – lead vocals, guitars, bajo sexto, mandolin, vihuela
- Conrad Lozano – Fender electric bass, acoustic bass, guitarrón, vocals
- Louie Pérez – drums, guitars, tenor longneck plectrum, hidalguera
- Steve Berlin – tenor and baritone saxophones, harmonica

Session members

- Alex Acuña – percussion
- T-Bone Burnett – vocals
- Mickey Curry – drums
- Anton Fier – drums
- Mitchell Froom – keyboards
- Ron Tutt – drums

Production

- T-Bone Burnett, Los Lobos – production
- Bernie Grundman – mastering
- Larry Hirsch – recording, mixing
- David Glover, Mike Kloster, Stephen Shelton, Jimmy Preziosi, Doug Schwartz, Tony Chiappa, Magic Moreno – assistant recording
- Mark Linett – remixing ("Is This All There Is?")

Artwork and design

- Jeff Price, Jeri McManus – art direction
- Lendon Flanagan – photography

== Charts ==
Chart (1987)	Peak position
Australian Albums (Kent Music Report)	62
Canada Top Albums/CDs (RPM)	20
Dutch Albums (Album Top 100)	42
Finnish Albums (The Official Finnish Charts)	18
New Zealand Albums (RMNZ)	12
Swedish Albums (Sverigetopplistan)	29
UK Albums (Official Charts)	77
US Billboard 200	47

"One Time, One Night"

Chart (1987)	Peak position
US Hot Country Songs (Billboard)	55

"Shakin' Shakin' Shakes"

Chart (1987)	Peak position
US Mainstream Rock (Billboard)	4

"Set Me Free (Rosa Lee)"

Chart (1987)	Peak position
US Mainstream Rock (Billboard)	21
