= Los Cenzontles =

Mexican-American musical group

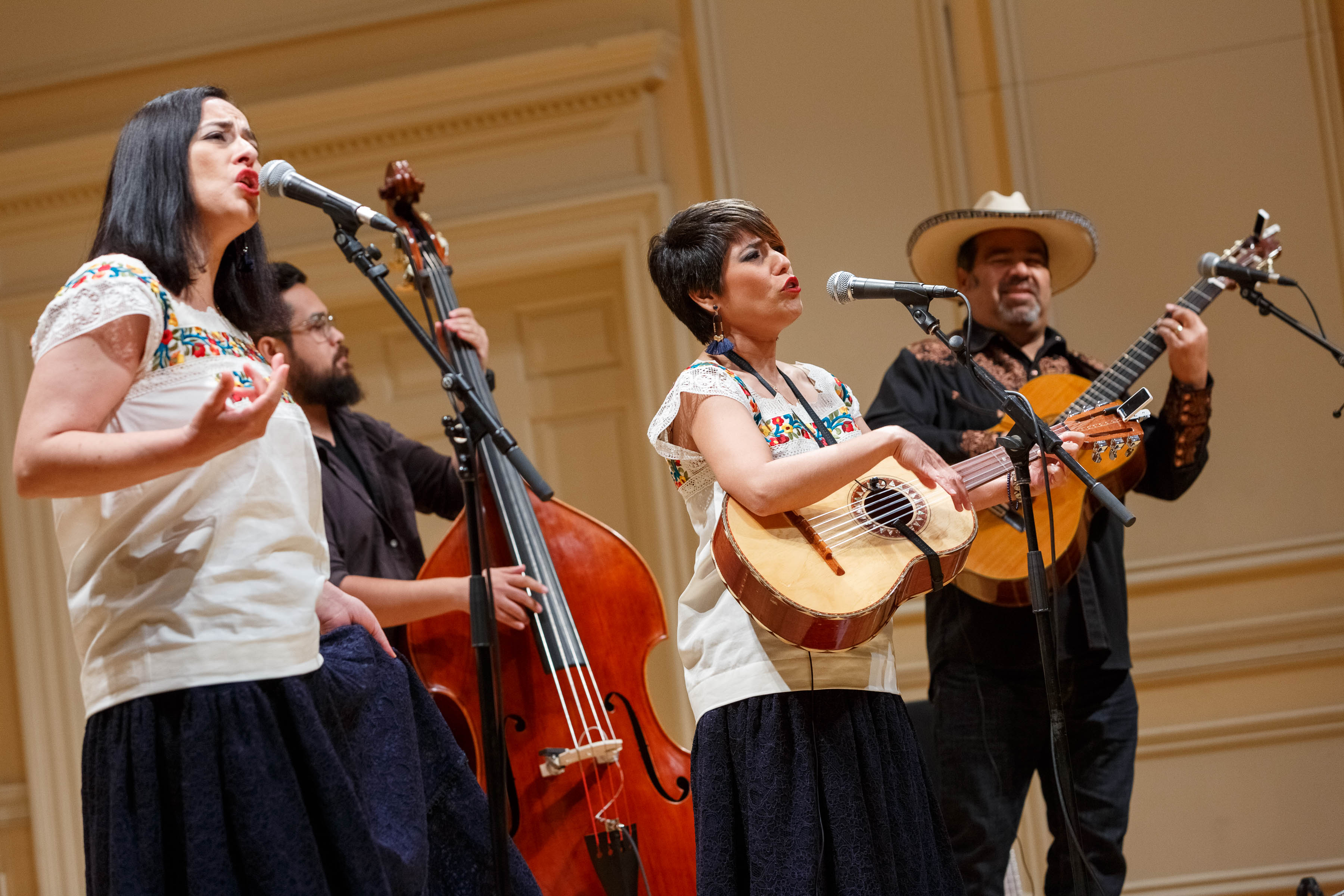
- Los Cenzontles perform at the Library of Congress in 2019

Background information
- Origin: San Pablo, California, United States
- Genres: Mexican folk, chicano rock, Mexican son, son jarocho, ranchera, traditional mariachi
- Years active: 1989 - Present
- Members: Eugene Rodriguez; Fabiola Trujillo; Lucina Rodriguez; Emiliano Rodriguez
- Website: http://www.loscenzontles.com

Los Cenzontles (Nahuatl for The Mockingbirds) is a Mexican-American group, cultural arts academy, and media production studio, that promotes Mexican roots music through research, performance, education, musical recordings and videos. They are based in the working-class city of San Pablo, California where they form the core of Los Cenzontles Cultural Arts Academy, where the members of the group were trained. Los Cenzontles have revived and promoted little known styles of Mexican regional music since 1989. The group has collaborated with numerous artists that include David Hidalgo, Linda Ronstadt, Los Lobos, Ry Cooder, Taj Mahal, Jackson Browne, The Chieftains and Flaco Jimenez, among others. Los Cenzontles has produced 30 tradition-based and cross cultural albums, 4 documentaries, and hundreds of video shorts available on their YouTube channel.

== History ==
Los Cenzontles was begun in 1989 by Eugene Rodriguez as part of a California Arts Council artist residency. The goal of the Los Cenzontles Project was to create a place for area youth to learn traditional Mexican music and dance. When students' training advanced, the original touring group of Los Cenzontles was formed to showcase Mexican folk music and focus on educational outreach. That same year Eugene met Grupo Mono Blanco, leaders in the fandango movement in Veracruz, Mexico. He established a long-term international collaboration designed to bridge the Jarocho and Chicano communities. Chicano teen members of Los Cenzontles traveled to rural Veracruz in 1991, 93 and 98. Rodriguez established the Fandango Project with support from the US Mexico Fund for Culture to create a residency to promote increased cultural participation in California for Gilberto Gutierrez, of Mono Blanco, and photographer Silvia Gonzalez de Leon.

In 1994, three major events provoked Rodriguez to incorporate Los Cenzontles as a non-profit organization:

1. That year the recording of Papa's Dream, produced by Eugene for Los Lobos, Lalo Guerrero and members of Los Cenzontles was released. The recording was subsequently nominated for a Grammy for Best Musical Album for Children.
2. Eugene Rodriguez incorporated Los Cenzontles Mexican Arts Center as a non-profit, responding to spiraling social problems among local youth.
3. That same year, 15-year-old Cecilia Rios, San Pablo resident and close friend of many of the Center's students, was brutally raped and murdered. In response to the tragic loss, the members of Los Cenzontles composed their first original work, El Corrido de Cecilia Rios.

In 1995, the group released its first album, Con Su Permiso, Señores. The group has released 23 albums in 21 years and have collaborated with David Hidalgo, Jackson Browne, Taj Mahal, Ry Cooder, The Chieftains, Linda Ronstadt, Lalo Guerrero, Pete Sears, Gregorio Hernández Ríos "El Goyo", Lázaro Ros, Mariachi los Camperos de Nati Cano, Carlos Caro, Shira Kammen, The Estrada Brothers, Saul Hernandez, Bobby Black, Bill Evans (banjo), Julian Gonzalez, Atilano Lopez, Grupo Mono Blanco and Santiago Jimenez, Jr. Currently, Los Cenzontles tours venues in the United States, Europe, Caribbean and Mexico. Los Cenzontles has also opened performances for Los Tigres del Norte, Los Lobos and Jaguares.

In 1997 Los Cenzontles Mexican Arts Center (LCMAC) sponsored the International Youth in the Tradition Festival featuring workshops and performances in Son Jarocho, Conjunto, Mariachi and Banda. The five-day festival featured youth groups from Mexico and California and artists including Lalo Guerrero, Yolanda del Rio, Graciela Beltran, Grupo Mono Blanco and others. The Festival was sponsored by the US Mexico Fund for Culture.

In 2002 LCMAC received the Coming Up Taller Award from the President's Committee on the Arts and the Humanities.

With support from the James Irvine Foundation, Los Cenzontles began developing a 3-part documentary series in 2003. The “Cultures of México in California” project is a cultural preservation/awareness project that explores the changing role of roots music and dance in Mexican immigrant and Mexican-American communities in California. Their first DVD, Pasajero, was released in 2004.

In 2013, Eugene Rodriguez was awarded a United States Artists Oliver Fellowship.

In 2016, Los Cenzontles completed a successful 11 day tour to Cuba where they performed numerous concerts and cultural exchanges in various cities that included Havana, Sancti Spiritus, Las Tunas and Santa Clara. The resulting documentary Conexiones: A Cuban Mexican Connection has been broadcast on Public Television on numerous affiliates nationwide and screened at many film festivals.

In 2017, they collaborated with Jackson Browne on the composition, recording and video of their song The Dreamer about DACA youth.

In 2018, Los Cenzontles performed with Preservation Hall Jazz Band at the SFJazz Gala that was followed up by an invitation to the group to do a week long residency at Preservation Hall in New Orleans.

In 2019, 22 members of Los Cenzontles, ages eight to adult, accompanied Linda Ronstadt on a trip to Sonora, Mexico to perform at the birthplace of Linda's grandfather. Jackson Browne also traveled on the trip that was filmed by director James Keach for an upcoming documentary.

In June 2019, the group performed at the Kennedy Center Millenium stage and Library of Congress in Washington D.C.

Today, Los Cenzontles continues to perform, research, teach, present and create new work.

== Current members ==
- Fabiola Trujillo - Voice
- Lucina Rodriguez - Voice, jarana, guitar, percussion, zapateado
- Eugene Rodriguez - Voice, guitars
- Verenice Velazques - Versos, dance, percussion

== Discography ==
- Con Su Permiso, Señores, 1995
- You'll Come Flying, 1997
- Amor, Paz y Sinceridad, 1999
- Volando en los Cafetales, 1999
- Hypnotizada, 1999
- De Una Bonita, 2000
- Cancionero, 2000
- Cuatro Maestros, 2001
- Media Vida, 2002
- Plan de la Villa, 2002
- El Pasajero, 2003
- Pocas Palabras, 2003
- Pasajero, A Journey of Time and Memory, 2004
- El Chivo Traditional Mariachi Volume III, 2004
- El Toro Viejo Traditional Mariachi Volume IV, 2006
- Los Senn-sont-less, 2007
- Songs of Wood and Steel, 2008 (with David Hidalgo)
- American Horizon, 2009 (with Taj Mahal and David Hidalgo)
- San Patricio, 2010 (contributing three songs with The Chieftains and Ry Cooder)
- Estado de Verguenza, 2010 (single)
- Raza de Oro, 2010
- Flor de Canela, 10 Anos de Dueto compilation, 2011
- Regeneration, 2012
- Los Cenzontles with David Hidalgo - Puro Jam, 2013
- American Roulette EP, 2014 (with David Hidalgo)
- Shades of Brown, Zydeco Mexican Connection 2015 (with David Hidalgo & Andre Thierry)
- Alma Campirana, 2015
- Covers, 2016
- Carta Jugada, with Los Texmaniacs and Flaco Jimenez, 2017
- Covers 2, 2018
- Con Mucho Sentimiento, Los Cenzontles Juvenil, 2018
- A La Mar, with Shira Kammen, 2018
- Alma P'urhépecha, with Atilano Lopez Patricio, 2018
- Juntos a La Distancia, 2002
- Son Con Son, En El Suelo Americano, with Mono Blanco and Kiki Valera, 2023

== DVD and video ==
- Pasajero, A Journey of Time and Memory, 2004
- Fandango, Searching for the White Monkey, 2006
- Vivir (To Live), 2008
- Los Cenzontles on YouTube
- Tata's Gift, 2014
- Jackson Browne - The Dreamer (Featuring Los Cenzontles)
- Conexiones: A Cuban Mexican Connection
- Musical Conversations - Los Cenzontles at Preservation Hall, 2020
- Songs of Wood & Steel, 2023
- Alma P'urhépecha, 2018
- Linda and La Marisoul, 2022
- P'urhépecha Uékani (Beloved P’urhépecha), 2022
- Living Altars, 2020
- Puntos de Vida (Threads of Life), 2021
- Conexiones: A New Orleans Mexican Connection, 2019
- Cuatro Maestros, 2022
- Caminos del Son, 2022
- Esperanza del Corazón, 2023
- Joy in Music, 2021
- The Fandango Project, 1993

== Bird of Four Hundred Voices ==
In 2024, Eugene Rodriguez published a personal and professional memoir titled, "Bird of Four Hundred Voices: A Mexican American Memoir of Music and Belonging."

Set against a historical backdrop where globalization in the 1990s spurred Mexican migration, altering US demographics and impacting the Mexican American community, Bird of Four Hundred Voices challenges us to reimagine our perceptions of tradition, identity, and belonging. Additionally, the rise of white supremacy, which threatens American democracy, as well as the one-size-fits-all "box-checking" of contemporary philanthropy adds further urgency to this reexamination. The book has received widespread praise.

Eugene Rodriguez’s memoir is a testament to the power of music as a unifying force between different cultures. Through his creation of Los Cenzontles in 1989, Rodriguez defied the rigidity of formal education and championed Mexican musical heritage, revealing how music can transcend boundaries and heal historical wounds. Highlighting collaborations with icons like Linda Ronstadt, Flaco Jiménez and Los Lobos, this book is both a celebration of Mexican culture and a powerful exploration of persistence.
