= Making Movies (band) =

American rock and roll band

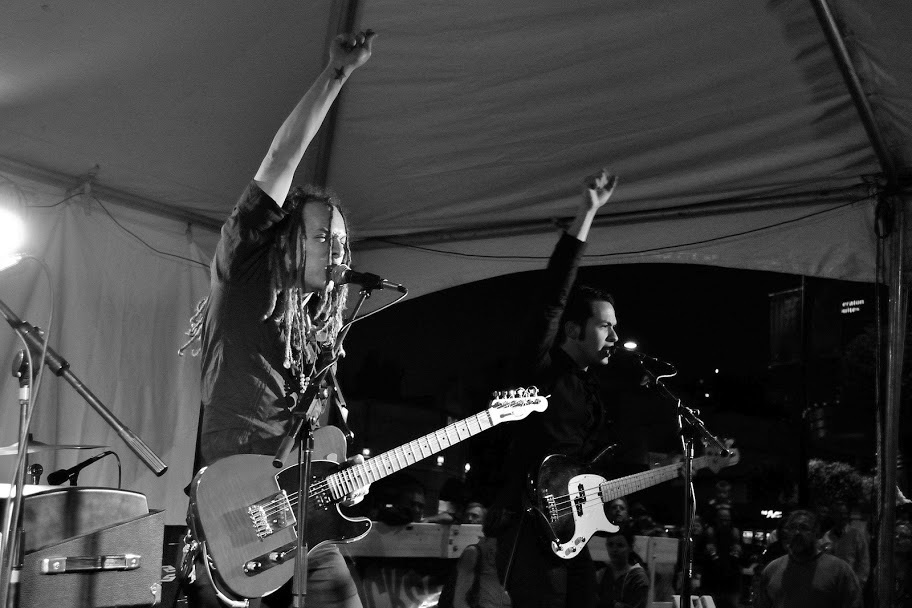
- Enrique and Diego Chi from Making Movies performing at the Plaza Art Fair, singing their song "Libertad"(2013)

Background information
- Origin: Kansas City, Missouri, US
- Genres: Indie rock, Latin rock, Son Cubano, Afro-Cuban, Cumbia, Spoken WordAmerican Roots
- Years active: 2009–present
- Labels: The Record Machine, independent
- Members: Enrique Chi; Juan Carlos Chaurand; Diego Chi; Duncan Burnett
- Past members: Brendan Culp; Andres Chaurand
- Website: www.mkngmvs.com

Making Movies is an international rock n' roll band known for its Latino activism in the United States and abroad. Formed in Kansas City, MO in 2009, their music includes elements of rock, cumbia, psychedelia, American roots, son cubano, and spoken word.

== Career ==
The band is composed of Panamanian brothers Enrique Chi (vocals, guitar) and Diego Chi (bass), along with Juan-Carlos Chaurand (percussion, keys) from Mexico, and Duncan Burnett (drums) from Kansas. Past members include Andres Chaurand and Brendan Culp. The band currently resides in Los Angeles, and Kansas City.

The band was nominated in 2019 for the Latin Grammy Album of the Year for their collaboration with Ruben Blades on the song “No Te Calles”, the first single from Blades album Paraiso Road Gang, and also featured on Making Movies most recent album ameri'kana. "No Te Calles" was also featured on NPR's Best Songs of 2019 .

Of the band's 5 album releases, their 3 LP's; A La Deriva (2014), I Am Another You (2017), and ameri'kana (2019), have all been produced by Steve Berlin of Los Lobos. The band released a string of acoustic singles in 2018 that featured collaborations with Latinx peers Las Cafeteras and Flor De Toloache. The band also joined Rubén Blades in Mexico City at the Auditorio Nacional in November 2019.

== History ==
In June 2012, the band released a self-produced EP and 7" titled “Aguardiente” on the Kansas City record label, The Record Machine.

In March 2012, the band recorded their sophomore album, titled A La Deriva ("adrift" or "swept away"), produced by Steve Berlin of Los Lobos. On a 10-day recording session, the band traveled to Portland, OR. to record and work with Berlin. The album, released on March 5, 2013, tells a story based on the struggles of an immigrant family that tragically falls apart in US-America, and the consequential impact on the following generation. Taking cues from Latin American folklore, the band soundswings intensely, at times sounding like Compay Segundo being played by Jimi Hendrix and at other times like Talking Heads digging deep into a dembow. In discussing the title track of the album, "Deriva," Felix Contreras of NPR's AltLatino said, “...the young band Making Movies (and its producer, Steve Berlin of Los Lobos) shows us how deeply thought-out lyrics sound next to a rhythm track that somehow both propels and floats without violating the laws of physics."

In May 2017, Making Movies performed at the Kennedy Center as a part of the JFK Centennial celebrations.

I Am Another You was released in 2017, and was produced by Steve Berlin. The album tells this story of three young men from different parts of the world who each face a crisis and go through terrible suffering. Though one man is from Venezuela, one is from Mexico, and one is from the Midwest, the parallels of their suffering reveal that they are, in actuality, the same person. This is intended to invoke the spirit of the Mayan phrase, “in lak’ech ala k’in” (English: "I am another you, and you are another me").

The quartet has toured with Hurray for the Riff Raff, Los Lobos, Tennis, Ozomatli, Ha Ha Tonka, Aterciopelados, Molotov, Neon Indian, Cold War Kids, Enanitos Verdes, Arterciopelados, PXNDX, Enjambre and Mariachi El Bronx among others.

== Critical reception ==
Making Movies' 2017 album, I Am Another You, has received generally positive praise from critics. NPR's Alt.Latino listed the album in its "Favorite Music of 2017 (So Far)", and it received favorable reviews from Remezcla, Clrvynt, and US-American Songwriter.

I Am Another You reached #3 on Billboard's Latin Pop Album Sales and #8 on Latin Album Sales and World Album Sales.

== Discography ==
Date	Title	Label
June 5, 2012	Aguardiente EP	The Record Machine
March 5, 2013	A La Deriva	United Interests
May 26, 2017	I Am Another You	3/2 Recordings
May 25, 2018	Ritmo De Mi Pueblo	3/2 Recordings
Jan 18, 2019	No Te Calles	with Ruben Blades
May 24, 2019	ameri'kana	3/2 Recordings
May 7, 2021	Boring Bits	
May 21, 2021	La Marcha	
Feb 4, 2022	En Vivo (sin aplauso)	
July 20, 2023	Medicina	
Sept 24, 2025	La Marea (feat. Mireya)	
