= Sí Se Puede =

Sí Se Puede may refer to:

- Sí se puede, the motto of the United Farm Workers of America
- Sí Se Puede!, a 1977 various artists charity album
- "Sí Se Puede" (Dexter), a 2008 television episode
