= Los Lobos =

American rock band

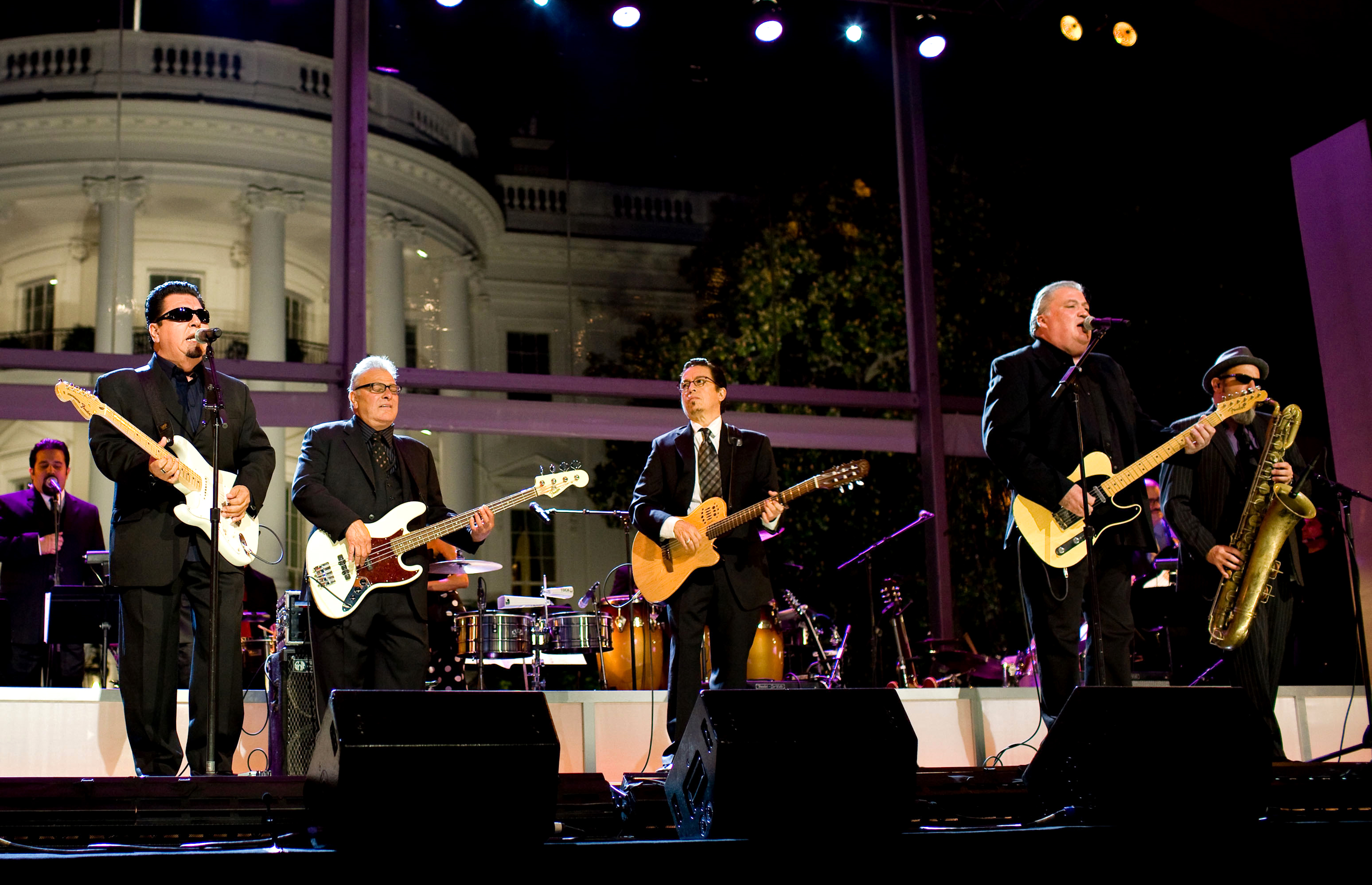
- Los Lobos performing at the White House in 2009

Background information
- Origin: East Los Angeles, California, U.S.
- Genres: Chicano rock; roots rock; Latin rock; Tex-Mex; country rock; Americana; heartland rock; cowpunk
- Years active: 1973–present
- Labels: Slash; Warner Bros.; Rough Trade; London; Mammoth; 429; RCA
- Members: David Hidalgo; Louie Pérez; Cesar Rosas; Conrad Lozano; Steve Berlin
- Past members: Francisco González; Richard Escalante
- Website: www.loslobos.org

Los Lobos (pronounced [los ˈloβos], Spanish for "the Wolves") is an American rock group from East Los Angeles, California. Their music is influenced by rock and roll, Tex-Mex, country, zydeco, folk, R&B, blues, brown-eyed soul, and traditional music such as cumbia, boleros and norteños. The band rose to international stardom in 1987, when their version of "La Bamba" peaked at the top of the Billboard Hot 100, and also topped the charts in the United Kingdom, and several other countries. Songs by Los Lobos have been recorded by Elvis Costello, Waylon Jennings, Frankie Yankovic, and Robert Plant. In 2015, they were nominated for induction into the Rock and Roll Hall of Fame. In 2018, they were inducted into the Austin City Limits Hall of Fame. They are also known for performing the theme song for Handy Manny. As of 2024, they have been nominated for twelve Grammy Awards and have won four.

== History ==
=== 1973–79: Formation and early releases ===
Vocalist and guitarist David Hidalgo and drummer Louie Pérez met at Garfield High School in East Los Angeles, California, and bonded over their mutual affinity for musical acts such as Fairport Convention, Randy Newman and Ry Cooder. Pérez recalls, "We're looking at each other, 'You like this stuff? I thought I was the only weird one.' So I went over to his house one day for about a year, which we spent listening to records, playing guitars, and starting to write songs." The two borrowed reel-to-reel recorders from a friend and created multitrack recordings of music spanning from parody songs to free-form jazz. They later enlisted fellow students Frank González, Cesar Rosas and Conrad Lozano to complete the group's lineup, in 1973. Their first album, Los Lobos del Este de Los Angeles, was recorded at two studios in Hollywood in 1977 over a period of about four months. At that time, they all had regular jobs, and it was hard to get together for the sessions. To accommodate that situation, their producer Luis Torres would call the engineer, Mark Fleisher, who owned and operated a high-speed tape duplicating studio in Hollywood, to find a studio when he knew all the band members could get off work that night. Most of the songs were recorded at a studio on Melrose Avenue, located next to the Paramount studios at the time, and a low-priced studio on Sunset Boulevard.

The band members were unsatisfied with playing only American Top 40 songs and began experimenting with the traditional Mexican music they listened to as children. This style of music received a positive reaction from audiences, leading the band to switch genres, performing at hundreds of weddings and dances between 1974 and 1980. "If you were married between 1973 and 1980 in East L.A., we probably played your wedding," said Louie Perez. "They would pay us like $400 for the four of us, a case of beer, and all the mole we could eat..." said David Hidalgo. However, Los Lobos took notice of the popular groups on the Hollywood music scene and added influences of rock to its sound.

Originally, they called themselves Los Lobos del Este (de Los Angeles), which translates to The Wolves of the East (of Los Angeles), a play on the name of the norteño band Los Tigres del Norte. There was another conjunto band at the time named "Los Lobos Del Norte", which had released several albums already. The name was quickly shortened to Los Lobos.

=== 1980–88: How Will the Wolf Survive? and commercial success ===
The band's first noteworthy public appearance occurred in 1980 at the Olympic Auditorium in Los Angeles, when they were hired by David Ferguson and CD Presents to open for Public Image Ltd. On September 28, 1983, the band released an extended play entitled ...And a Time to Dance, which was well received by critics but sold only about 50,000 copies. Slash Records/Warner Bros Records was not confident enough in Los Lobos to release a standard 10-song LP. So they released a 7-song debut LP. Seven months after the release, the group won a Grammy Award for Best Mexican American Song in 1984 However, the sales of the EP earned the group enough money to purchase a Dodge van, enabling the band to tour throughout the United States for the first time. Los Lobos returned to the studio in the summer of 1984 to record its first major-label album, How Will the Wolf Survive? The album's title and the title song were inspired by a National Geographic article entitled "Where Can the Wolf Survive?," which the band members related to their own struggle to gain success in the United States while maintaining their Mexican roots.

Los Lobos were exposed to Rock and Roll audiences when they opened for The Clash, and they later opened for the Los Angeles band the Blasters, whose influences included rhythm and blues and rockabilly. Philadelphia born Steve Berlin played saxophone for the Blasters then left the group to join Los Lobos. When he joined the band, Berlin spoke about his similar record collection to the other members of Los Lobos, where they shared loves for George Jones and Hank Williams.

The film Colors includes "One Time, One Night" in the opening credits, although the song was not included on the soundtrack album. In 1986, members of Los Lobos appeared alongside Tomata du Plenty in the punk rock musical Population: 1. In 1987, they released a second album, By the Light of the Moon. In the same year, they recorded some Ritchie Valens covers for the soundtrack of the film La Bamba, including the title track, which became a number one single for the band plus "Come On Let's Go" and "Donna" which also charted. In 1988, they followed with another album, La pistola y el corazón, featuring original and traditional Mexican songs. The album never peaked above #189 in the pop charts, but it did garner Los Lobos their second Grammy Award for Best Mexican American Album in 1990. Also in 1988 they contributed their cover of "I Wan'na Be Like You (The Monkey Song)", to the Disney tribute album Stay Awake: Various Interpretations of Music from Vintage Disney Films.

=== 1988–94: The Neighborhood and Kiko ===
In the late 1980s and early 1990s the band toured extensively throughout the world, opening for such acts as Bob Dylan, U2 and the Grateful Dead.

Los Lobos returned with The Neighborhood in 1990, and the more experimental Kiko (produced by Mitchell Froom) in 1992. Kiko sold more units (over 400,000 sold) than the previous two albums and was voted 'Album of the year' by the Los Angeles Times and Chicago Sun-Times. The band contributed a lively cover of "Bertha", a song which they often performed live, to the Grateful Dead tribute–rain forest benefit album Deadicated. In 1994 they also contributed a track, "Down Where the Drunkards Roll", to the Richard Thompson tribute album Beat the Retreat.

On the band's twentieth anniversary in 1993, they released a two-CD collection of singles, outtakes, live recordings and hits, entitled Just Another Band from East L.A.

=== 1995–98: Papa's Dream and Colossal Head ===
In 1995, Los Lobos released the prestigious and bestselling record Papa's Dream on Music for Little People Records along with veteran guitarist and singer Lalo Guerrero. The album garnered a Grammy nomination for Best Children's Album. The band also scored the film Desperado. The album track "Mariachi Suite" won a Grammy Award for Best Pop Instrumental Performance and was their 3rd Grammy Award.

In 1996, they released Colossal Head. In spite of the fact that the album was critically acclaimed, Warner Brothers decided to drop the band from their label. Los Lobos spent the next few years on side projects. The band contributed along with Money Mark to the AIDS benefit album Silencio=Muerte: Red Hot + Latin, produced by the Red Hot Organization, on which they performed "Pepe and Irene."

=== 1999–2006: Mammoth Records, subsequent releases ===
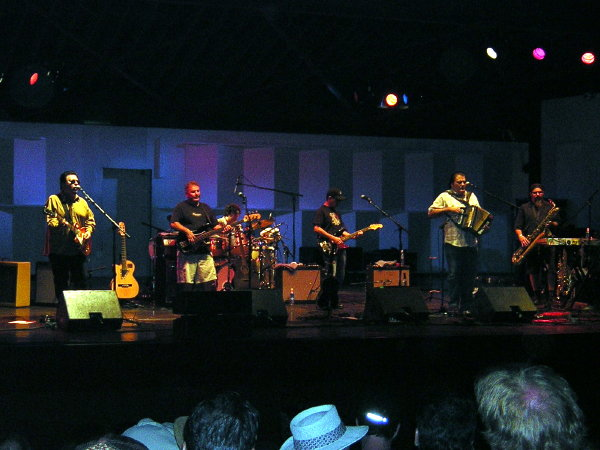
Los Lobos on stage in 2005

Los Lobos signed to Mammoth Records (a music division of The Walt Disney Company) in 1997 and released This Time in 1999. Mammoth also reissued 1977's Del Este de Los Angeles. In November 2000, Rhino/Warner Archives released the boxed set Cancionero: Mas y Mas.

In 2001, Los Lobos was awarded the El Premio Billboard Award.

The band released their Mammoth Records debut, Good Morning Aztlan in 2002. They released The Ride in 2004 as an unofficial 30th Anniversary album. The Ride featured Tom Waits, Mavis Staples, Bobby Womack, Elvis Costello and others covering Los Lobos music with the band. They did a follow-up album in 2005, Ride This – The Covers EP featuring Los Lobos covers of songs by Dave Alvin, Waits, Costello and others.

Los Lobos released its first full-length live-show DVD Live at the Fillmore in 2004. The DVD captures the band's act over a two-day period in July at the famed San Francisco venue.

In September 2006, Los Lobos released The Town and the City (Mammoth Records) to much critical acclaim. The album's lyrics deal with Louis Perez's childhood in East Los Angeles, while the music provides complex and original soundscapes reminiscent of their previous release Kiko. Cartoonist Jaime Hernandez did the artwork for the album. The album is told in the first person, with each song serving as an episodic step.

=== 2007–present ===
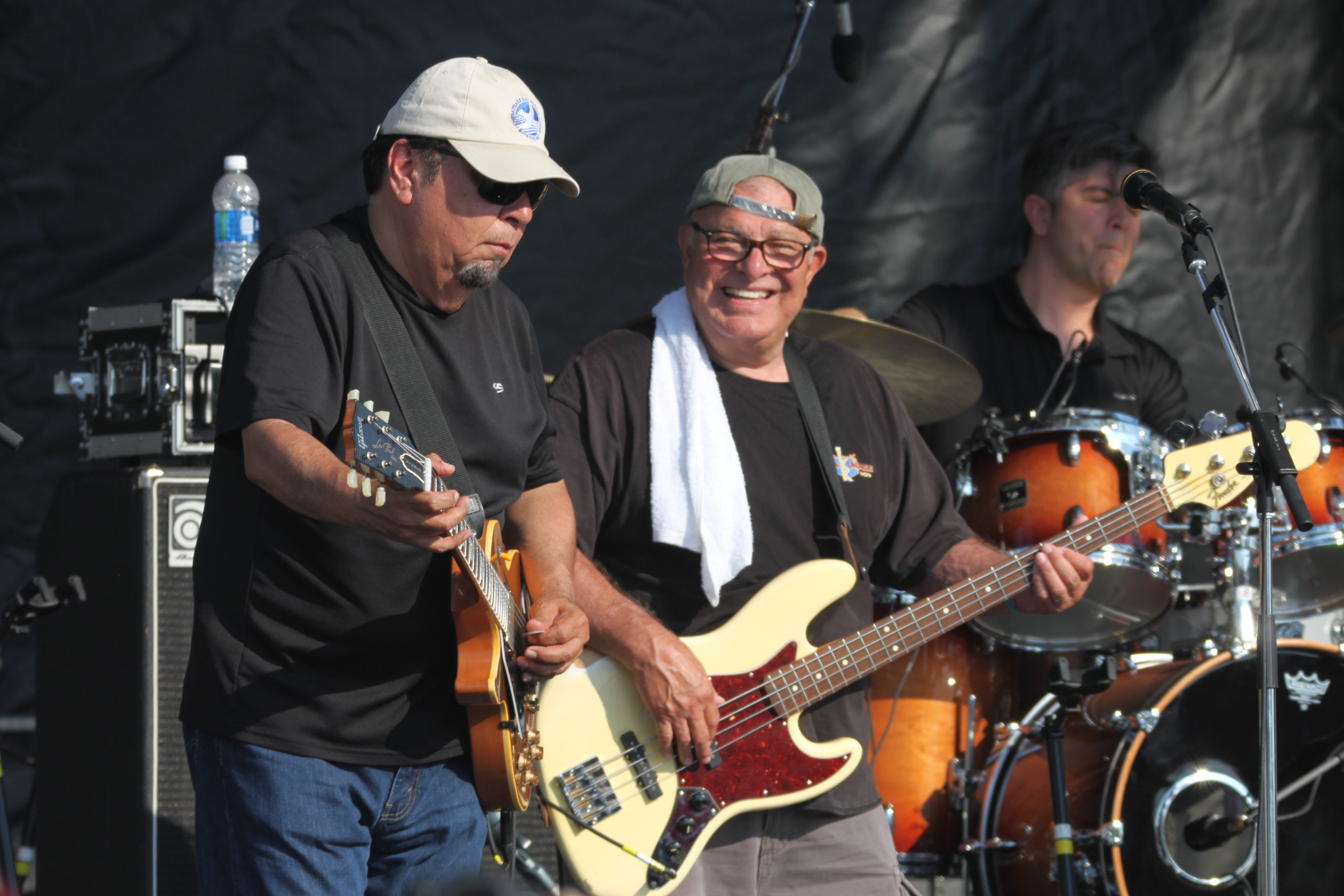
Los Lobos performing in 2017: Cesar, Conrad and Enrique

In 2007, Los Lobos performed a cover of Bob Dylan's "Billy 1" (from Pat Garrett & Billy the Kid) for the soundtrack to Todd Haynes's film I'm Not There. Also in 2007, they participated in Goin' Home: A Tribute to Fats Domino (Vanguard), contributing their version of Domino's "The Fat Man."

In 2009, the group under contract to Disney Music released an album of Disney covers, Los Lobos Goes Disney (Disney Sound/Walt Disney Records) and participated in a tribute album to the late Doug Sahm, Keep Your Soul: A Tribute to Doug Sahm (Vanguard). The same year, on October 13, they also played on the South Lawn of the White House during the "In Performance at the White House: Fiesta Latina" concert, celebrating Hispanic musical heritage.

In 2010, Cesar Rosas and David Hidalgo were featured artists in the Experience Hendrix Tour.

On August 3, 2010, the group released their first album in four years, Tin Can Trust. In 2011, the group was nominated for two Grammy Awards for Tin Can Trust in the categories of Best Rock Instrumental Performance and Best Americana Album.

In 2011, the group was awarded the Latin Grammy Lifetime Achievement Award.

In 2013, the group toured Europe supporting Neil Young and Crazy Horse.

On September 25, 2015, their album Gates of Gold was released.

On October 9, 2015, Los Lobos was nominated for induction into the Rock and Roll Hall of Fame for the first time.

In 2017, Los Lobos appeared in the multi award-winning documentary film The American Epic Sessions directed by Bernard MacMahon, where they recorded "El Cascabel", live direct-to-disc on the first electrical sound recording system from the 1920s. During their session, the belt holding the 100Ib weight that powered the 1924 cutting lathe broke and Jack White had to rush to an upholstery shop to repair it.

Los Lobos was inducted into the Austin City Limits Hall of Fame in 2018.

On October 4, 2019, Los Lobos released Llegó Navidad, an album of Christmas music from Central America and South America with Mexican folk songs, as well as an original song by Hidalgo and Pérez.

On January 1, 2020, Los Lobos performed in the Tournament of Roses Parade in Pasadena, California.

The band was a recipient of a 2021 National Heritage Fellowship awarded by the National Endowment for the Arts, which is the United States government's highest honor in the folk and traditional arts.

On July 30, 2021, Los Lobos released their 18th album, Native Sons, on New West Records. It is a collection of 12 songs written or performed by California-based musicians (including Jackson Browne, The Beach Boys, The Blasters, Thee Midniters, Willie Bobo, and Lalo Guerrero) with one song written by Hidalgo and Pérez, the title track "Native Sons".

The group's co-founder and former band member Francisco González died on March 30, 2022, at the age of 68.

On April 3, 2022, at the 64th Annual Grammy Awards which was held at the MGM Grand Garden Arena in Las Vegas, Los Lobos won their fourth Grammy Award for Native Sons, this time in the Best Americana Album category.

On November 25, 2023, Los Lobos celebrated their 50th Anniversary at their alma mater, James Garfield High School in East Los Angeles with a sold-out performance at the high school's auditorium. Two shows earlier that week in Los Angeles also sold out immediately: The Whisky a Go Go in West Hollywood and The Paramount Theatre in Boyle Heights.

In February 2024, Los Lobos were inducted into the California Hall of Fame.

In March 2026, a documentary film titled Los Lobos Native Sons, premiered at the South By Southwest Film Festival in Austin, Texas. A film five years in the making, among the people interviewed are musicians Tom Waits, Linda Rondstadt, Ozomatli, Flaco Jimenez, Bonnie Raitt and actors Cheech Marin, Edward James Olmos and Chicano activist Dolores Huerta.

== Members ==
- David Hidalgo – vocals, guitar, accordion, fiddle, requinto jarocho (1973–present)
- Louie Pérez – drums, guitar, jarana huasteca, vocals (1973–present)
- Cesar Rosas – vocals, guitar, bajo sexto (1973–present)
- Conrad Lozano – bass, guitarron, vocals (1973–present)
- Steve Berlin – saxophone, flute, keyboards, percussion (1982–present)

=== Former members ===
- Francisco "Frank" González – vocals, mandolin, arpa jarocha (1973–1976; died 2022)
- Richard Escalante – bass, vocals (1973–1974)

=== Touring musicians ===
- Victor Bisetti – drums, percussion (1990–2003)
- Cougar Estrada – drums, percussion (2003–2011)
- Enrique "Bugs" González – drums, percussion (2012–2020)
- Alfredo Ortiz – drums, percussion (2021–present)

== Discography ==
=== Albums ===
- Los Lobos del Este de Los Angeles (Just another band from East L.A.), 1978
- How Will the Wolf Survive?, 1984
- By the Light of the Moon, 1987
- La Pistola y el Corazón, 1988
- The Neighborhood, 1990
- Kiko, 1992
- Papa's Dream, 1995
- Colossal Head, 1996
- This Time, 1999
- Good Morning Aztlán, 2002
- The Ride, 2004
- The Town and the City, 2006
- Los Lobos Goes Disney, 2009
- Tin Can Trust, 2010
- Gates of Gold, 2015
- Llegó Navidad, 2019
- Native Sons, 2021

=== Live albums ===
- Live at the Fillmore, 2005
- Acoustic en Vivo, 2005
- Chuy's Tape Box, Vol. 1, 2005
- One Time, One Night: Live Recordings Vol. 1, 2007
- One Time, One Night: Live Recordings Vol. 2, 2010
- Kiko Live, 2012 (Recorded February 24, 2006 at House of Blues, San Diego)
- Disconnected in New York City, 2013

=== Compilations ===
- Just Another Band from East L.A. – A Collection, 1993
- El Cancionero Mas y Mas, 2000 (boxed set)
- Wolf Tracks – Best of Los Lobos, 2006

=== Extended plays ===
- ...And a Time to Dance, 1983
- Ride This – The Covers EP, 2004

=== Soundtrack, compilation, and guest appearances ===
- Si Se Puede!, Various Artists, 1977 (Pan American) – backing band on all tracks
- Eating Raoul: Original Motion Picture Soundtrack, 1982 (Varèse Sarabande) – "Diablo Con Vestido" and "How Much Can I Do"
- L.A. Rockabilly, 1982 (Rhino Records) – "We're Gonna Rock"
- Graceland, Paul Simon, 1986 (Warner Bros.) – "All Around the World or the Myth of Fingerprints"
- A Fine Mess: Original Motion Picture Soundtrack, 1986 (Motown) – "I'm Gonna Be a Wheel Someday"
- The Money Pit: Original Motion Picture Soundtrack, 1986 – "La Bamba"
- La Bamba: Original Motion Picture Soundtrack, 1987 (Slash/Warner Bros.) – "La Bamba", "Come On, Let's Go" and six others
- Colors, 1988 (Orion Pictures) – "One Time, One Night" (not on soundtrack album)
- Stay Awake: Various Interpretations of Music from Vintage Disney Films, 1988 (A&M Records) – "I Wanna Be Like You (The Monkey Song)"
- Bull Durham: Original Motion Picture Soundtrack, 1988 (Capitol) – "I Got Loaded"
- Hey Good Lookin (video), Buckwheat Zydeco, 1990 – with David Hidalgo and Dwight Yoakam
- Deadicated: A Tribute to the Grateful Dead, 1991 (Arista) – "Bertha"
- The Mambo Kings: Original Motion Picture Soundtrack, 1992 (Elektra) – "Beautiful Maria of My Soul"
- In The Spotlight: A Beatles Songbook, 1993 (Lonesome Pine/PBS TV special) – "Tomorrow Never Knows"
- Untamed Heart, 1993 (Metro-Goldwyn-Mayer) – "Try Me" (not on soundtrack album)
- Beat the Retreat – Songs by Richard Thompson, 1994 (Capitol) – "Down Where the Drunkards Roll"
- I Only Wrote this Song for You: A Tribute to Johnny Thunders, 1994 (Essential) – "Alone in a Crowd"
- Grammy's Greatest Moments Volume III, 1994 – live performance of "La Bamba" from the 1988 Grammy Awards
- Desperado: The Soundtrack, 1995 (Epic Soundtrax) – primary score composer and performer
- The Last Supper, 1995 Columbia Pictures – "Wicked Rain" (not on soundtrack album)
- Till the Night is Gone: A Tribute to Doc Pomus, 1995 (Forward/Rhino) – "Lonely Avenue"
- Feeling Minnesota: Original Soundtrack, 1996 (Atlantic Records) - "Minnesota Medley"
- Not Fade Away (Remembering Buddy Holly), 1996 (MCA) – "Midnight Shift"
- The End of Violence: Songs from the Motion Picture Soundtrack, 1997 (Outpost Recordings) – "Me Estas Matando"
- Silencio=Muerte: Red Hot + Latin, 1998 (H.O.L.A. Records) – "Pepe and Irene"
- The Sopranos: Music from the HBO Original Series, 1999 (Playtone, Columbia, Sony Music Soundtrax) – "Viking"
- Live at the World Café - Volume 9, 1999 (World Cafe) – "This Time"
- Spy Kids: Music from the Dimension Motion Picture, 2001 (Chapter III Records) – "Spy Wedding" and "Oye Como Spy"
- House of Mouse, 2001 – End Credits Music
- Look at All the Love We Found: A Tribute to Sublime, 2005 (Cornerstone RAS) – "Pawn Shop"
- Nacho Libre: Music from the Motion Picture, 2006 (Lakeshore Records) – "Saint Behind the Glass"
- Handy Manny, 2006 (Buena Vista Television, Disney–ABC Domestic Television television series) – "Handy Manny Theme Song"
- I'm Not There: Original Soundtrack, 2007 (Sony Music Soundtrax, Columbia) – "Billy 1"
- Goin' Home: A Tribute to Fats Domino, 2007 (Vanguard) – "The Fat Man"
- Keep Your Soul: A Tribute to Doug Sahm, 2009 (Vanguard) – "It Didn't Even Bring Me Down"
- Man of Somebody's Dreams: A Tribute to Chris Gaffney, 2010 (Yep Roc Records) – "A Man of Somebody's Dreams"
- El Infierno: Soundtrack, 2010 (Bandidos Films) – "Mexico Americano", "Serenato Norteña" and "Prenda del Alma"
- Rango: Music from the Motion Picture, 2011 (Anti-) – "El Canelo", "Walk Don't Rango" and "Rango Theme Song"
- Use Me, David Bromberg, 2011 (Appleseed) – "The Long Goodbye"
- Music from The American Epic Sessions: Original Motion Picture Soundtrack, 2017 (Lo-Max, Columbia, Third Man) – "El Cascabel"

=== DVD ===
- Live at the Fillmore, 2004
- Kiko Live, 2012 (Recorded February 24, 2006 at House of Blues, San Diego)

=== Singles ===
Year	Single	Peak chart positions											Certifications (sales threshold)	Album
Year	Single	AUS	BEL	CAN	ESP	FRA	IRE	NED	NZ	SUI	UK	US	Certifications (sales threshold)	Album
1981	"Under the Boardwalk"	—	—	—	—	—	—	—	—	—	—	—		Non-album songs
1981	"Farmer John"	—	—	—	—	—	—	—	—	—	—	—		Non-album songs
1983	"Ay Te Dejo en San Antonio"	—	—	—	—	—	—	—	—	—	—	—		...and a Time to Dance
1984	"Let's Say Goodnight"	—	—	—	—	—	—	—	—	—	—	—		...and a Time to Dance
1984	"Don't Worry Baby"	—	—	—	—	—	—	—	—	—	57	—		How Will the Wolf Survive?
1984	"Will the Wolf Survive"	—	—	—	—	—	—	38	—	—	—	78		How Will the Wolf Survive?
1987	"Shakin' Shakin' Shakes"	—	—	—	—	—	—	—	—	—	—	—		By the Light of the Moon
1987	"Set Me Free (Rosa Lee)"	—	—	—	—	—	—	—	45	—	99	—		By the Light of the Moon
1987	"Come On, Let's Go"	22	13	25	9	—	9	24	14	22	18	21		La Bamba (soundtrack)
1987	"La Bamba"	1	2	1	1	1	1	2	1	1	1	1	BPI: Silver; CAN: Platinum	La Bamba (soundtrack)
1988	"Donna"	98	27	—	—	29	—	—	32	26	83	—		La Bamba (soundtrack)
1988	"One Time, One Night"	—	—	—	—	—	—	—	—	—	—	—		By the Light of the Moon
1990	"Down on the Riverbed"	—	—	67	—	—	—	—	—	—	—	—		The Neighborhood
1991	"Bertha"	—	—	—	—	—	—	—	—	—	—	—		Deadicated: A Tribute to the Grateful Dead
1992	"Bella María de Mi Alma"	—	—	—	—	—	—	—	—	—	—	—		Just Another Band from East LA: A Collection
1992	"Reva's House"	—	—	—	—	—	—	—	—	—	—	—		Kiko
1992	"Kiko and the Lavender Moon"	—	—	—	—	—	—	—	—	—	—	—		Kiko
2000	"Cumbia Raza"	—	—	—	—	—	—	—	—	—	—	—		This Time
"—" denotes releases that did not chart

=== Featured singles ===
Year	Single	Artist	Album
2010	"Wasted Days and Wasted Nights"	Rick Trevino	Non-album song

== See also ==
- Desperado Soundtrack
- Los Super Seven
- Latin Playboys
- Handy Manny
