= Jarana =

A jarana is a guitar-like string instrument from Mexico. There are different regional versions of the jarana, notably:

- Jarana huasteca, string instrument of the Huastec region, Mexico
- Jarana jarocha, string instrument of Veracruz, Mexico
- Jarana yucateca, dance and musical form of Yucatán, Mexico

It can also refer to:

- Harana (serenade), a serenade tradition in rural areas in the Philippines
- A traditional Mexican couples dance, typical of Yucatán and Campeche, on the music which accompanies it
- The noun jarana in Spanish translates to "revelry" or "animated party".
