= Steve Berlin =

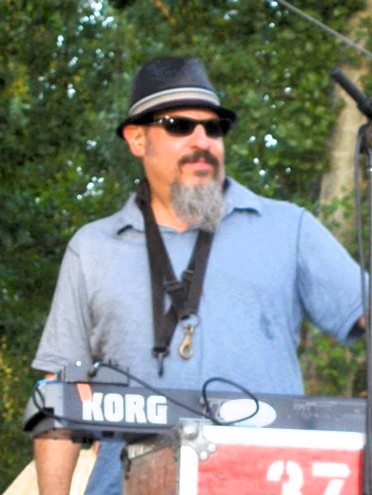
- Berlin in 2009

Background information
- Born: September 14, 1955 (age 71); Philadelphia, Pennsylvania, United States
- Genre: Rock
- Occupations: Musician, producer, songwriter
- Instruments: Saxophone, keyboards, flute

Steven M. Berlin (born September 14, 1955, in Philadelphia) is an American saxophonist, keyboardist and record producer, best known as a member of the rock group Los Lobos and, before that, Top Jimmy & the Rhythm Pigs, the Blasters, and the Flesh Eaters. Berlin is married and lives with his wife and children in Portland, Oregon. Berlin joined the band Tuatara as a side project in 1998 on their second album, Trading with the Enemy.

== Background ==
As either a session musician or producer, Berlin has worked with the Soul Survivors, Crash Test Dummies, Backyard Tire Fire, The Beat Farmers, John Lee Hooker, the Paladins, Faith No More, Dave Alvin, R.E.M., the Go-Go's, the Smithereens, the Replacements, Leo Kottke, Sheryl Crow, the Act, Los Super Seven, Ozomatli, Rickie Lee Jones, Leftover Salmon, String Cheese Incident, Alec Ounsworth (Clap Your Hands Say Yeah), Raul Malo, Rick Trevino, Jackie Greene, the Tragically Hip, Great Big Sea, the Bridge, Nathan Wiley, the Dandy Warhols, Making Movies, No Te Va Gustar, Brownout, Shinyribs, Deer Tick and John Wesley Harding.
