= Cesar Rosas =

American singer-songwriter

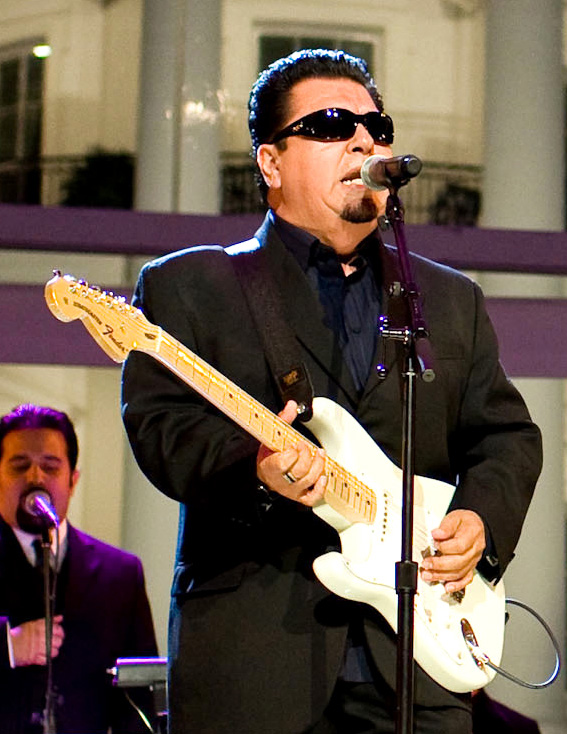
- Cesar Rosas performing at the White House, 2009

Background information
- Born: 26 September 1954 (age 71); Hermosillo, Mexico
- Genres: Chicano rock, Tex-Mex, latin rock, roots rock, blues-rock, brown-eyed soul, Americana
- Occupations: Musician, songwriter
- Instruments: Vocals, guitar
- Label: Rykodisk

Cesar J. Rosas (born September 26, 1954) is an American singer, songwriter and guitarist best known as a member of the rock and roll group Los Lobos. Rosas also participates in the Latin supergroup Los Super Seven. Rosas is known for his trademark black sunglasses, goatee and black hair. He plays guitar left handed.

Aside from live shows with Los Lobos, Cesar Rosas has been active as a session musician and sideman during the past several decades. In addition, he released a solo album, Soul Disguise, in February 1999, and toured after its release.

== Biography ==
Rosas was born in Mexico and grew up in Los Angeles. He was deeply interested in music from his teens, taking inspiration from a wide range of performers including traditional Mexican styles, mainstream rock & roll, as well as soul music and R&B. He met the musicians who would later form Los Lobos while a teenager at Garfield High School.

Rosas generally writes material solo and sings his own tunes, while bandmates David Hidalgo and Louie Pérez work as a duo for their songs that Hidalgo sings.

Los Lobos were embraced by the 1980s LA punk rock scene, and Rosas reports taking inspiration from the energy and aggressive guitar styles of punk rock bands.

== Personal life ==
Rosas has three daughters, Ruby, Amber and Victoria.

Rosas's wife Sandra Rosas was reported missing in October, 1999. Her daughters had returned home, and discovered her missing along with signs of a struggle such as broken glass and the front door wide open. Her half-brother Gabriel Gómez quickly became a suspect in the case, given his long history of criminal activities and recent tensions with Sandra. Though her body was not immediately found, Gómez was tried on the basis of circumstantial evidence and convicted of her murder. He was sentenced to life in prison without the possibility of parole. Gómez later led police to Sandra Rosas' remains on November 22, 2000, in Santa Clarita.

== Solo discography ==
- Soul Disguise (1999)
- Live from the Galaxy [recorded at the Galaxy Theater, Santa Ana, California, in 1999] (2015)
- La Fiesta (2016)

== See also ==
- List of kidnappings
