= Conrad Lozano =

American musician

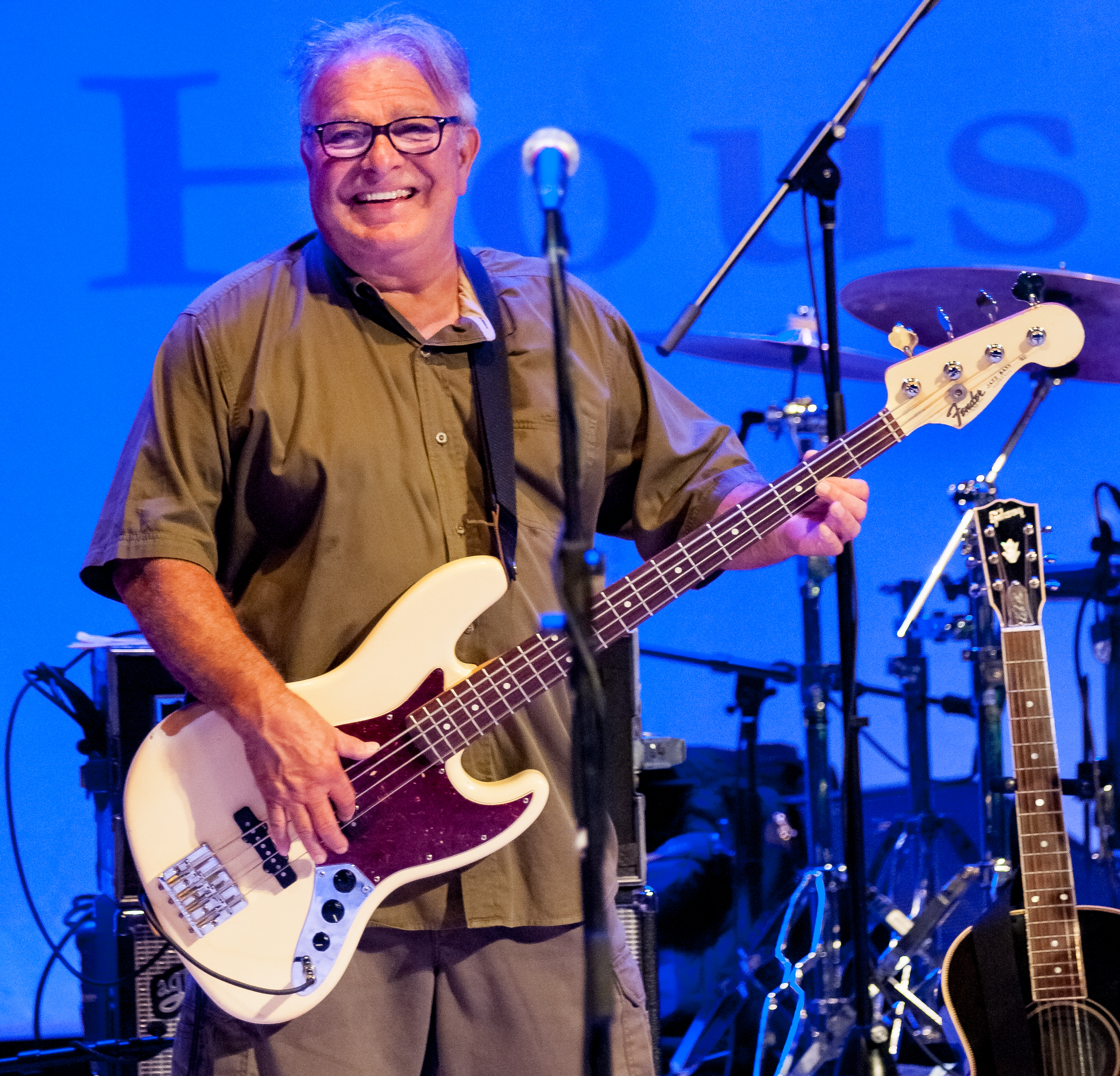
Conrad Lozano performs with Los Lobos at Boarding House Park in Lowell, Massachusetts

Conrad R. Lozano (born March 21, 1951, in Los Angeles, California) is an American musician and the bass player for Los Lobos.
