= David Hidalgo =

American musician

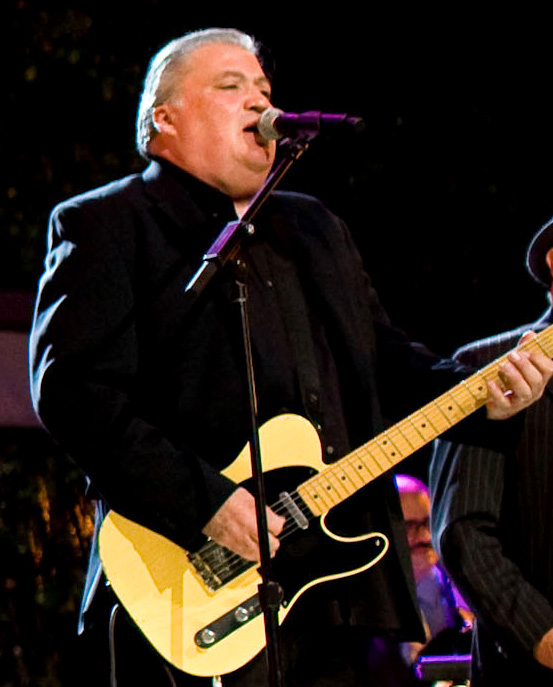
- Hidalgo performing with Los Lobos on the South Lawn of the White House, October 13, 2009

Background information
- Born: David Kent Hidalgo; October 6, 1954 (age 72); Los Angeles, California, U.S.
- Genres: Chicano rock; roots rock; Tex-Mex; Americana; cowpunk
- Occupations: Musician; songwriter
- Instruments: Vocals; guitar; accordion; violin; 6-string banjo; cello; requinto jarocho; percussion; drums
- Years active: 1973–present

David Kent Hidalgo (born October 6, 1954) is an American singer-songwriter and multi-instrumentalist, best known for his work with the band Los Lobos. Hidalgo frequently plays accordion, violin, 6-string banjo, cello, requinto jarocho, percussion, drums and guitar as a session musician on other artists' releases.

== Career ==
In 1973, Hidalgo was one of the founding members of Los Lobos, for which he wrote most songs together with Louie Pérez. He also participated as a guest musician on albums of other artists, among them David Alvin, Buckwheat Zydeco, Paul Burlison, T-Bone Burnett, Peter Case, Toni Childs, Marc Cohn, Ry Cooder, Elvis Costello, Crowded House, The Fabulous Thunderbirds, John Lee Hooker, Rickie Lee Jones, Leo Kottke, Roy Orbison, Dolly Parton, Pierce Pettis, Bonnie Raitt, Paul Simon, Taj Mahal, Suzanne Vega, Bob Dylan and Tom Waits. He is a member of the supergroup Los Super Seven and of the Latin Playboys, a side project made up of some of the members of Los Lobos. With Mike Halby of Canned Heat, he formed another band, Houndog, as a side project. He also appeared on national television in the U.S., backing Waits.

In 1987, he contributed the song "Will the Wolf Survive?" to the movie Promised Land. For Dennis Hopper's Colors (1988), he wrote the song "One Time, One Night". He wrote the songs "Manifold De Amour", "Forever Night Shade Mary" and "Chinese Surprize" for the 1995 action film Desperado. He contributed his melancholic song "La pistola y el corazón" for the movie The Mexican (2001).

Hidalgo's songs have been covered by the Jerry Garcia Band, Waylon Jennings, Bonnie Raitt and others. He has performed in Eric Clapton's Crossroads Guitar Festival since its inception in 2004, including a performance with Los Lobos in April 2013 at Madison Square Garden. Clapton joined the band on stage for their song "Burn It Down", from their 2010 album, Tin Can Trust.

== Personal life and family ==
His son, David Jr., is the drummer for the band Social Distortion. His other son Vincent has played bass for the band Mariachi El Bronx.

== Discography ==
=== Selected collaborations ===
- T-Bone Burnett (guitar, accordion, vocals, 8-String Bass on T-Bone Burnett (1986)
- Peter Case (The Man with the Blue Post Modern Fragmented Neo-Traditionalist Guitar)
- Los Cenzontles (co-producer, songwriter and multi-instrumentalist on Songs of Wood & Steel)
- Eric Clapton (Crossroads festival DVD, CD)
- Ry Cooder (Chávez Ravine)
- Elvis Costello (harmony vocal on King of America, guitar and harmony vocal on Momofuku)
- Toni Childs (House of Hope)
- Crowded House (accordion "As Sure as I Am" on Woodface (1991))
- Bob Dylan (accordion on Together Through Life and Christmas in the Heart; guitar, accordion, violin on Tempest)
- John Hammond (guitar, mandolin, vocals on Ready for love (2003))
- John Lee Hooker (multiple projects)
- Roy Orbison (King of Hearts)
- Willy DeVille (Backstreets of Desire, Crow Jane Alley)
- Gov't Mule (Politician) (guitar and vocals on The Deepest End, Live in Concert)
- The 1994 tribute to songwriter Mark Heard, Strong Hand of Love
- Mato Nanji
- Luther Dickinson (3 Skulls and the Truth, Blues Bureau International)
- Rickie Lee Jones (Traffic from Paradise, The Evening of My Best Day)
- Tonio K. (Olé)
- Leo Kottke (Try and Stop Me)
- G. Love & Special Sauce (viola on "Missing My Baby")
- Taj Mahal & Los Cenzontles (co-producer, songwriter and multi-instrumentalist on "American Horizon")
- Ozomatli (multiple projects)
- Dolly Parton (Treasures)
- Pierce Pettis (Chase the Buffalo)
- Bonnie Raitt (Fundamental)
- Marc Ribot (Border Music)
- Paul Simon ("All Around the World or The Myth of Fingerprints" on Graceland (1986))
- Martin Simpson (Kambara Music in Native Tongues (1998))
- Tremoloco (Dulcinea)
- Suzanne Vega (99.9F°)
- Tom Waits (accordion on "Cold, Cold Ground" and "Train Song" on Frank's Wild Years (1987); accordion and violin on "Whistle Down the Wind" on Bone Machine (1992); guitar, accordion, violin, bass, backing vocals on several tracks on Bad As Me (2011))
- Buckwheat Zydeco (multiple projects)

== Music videos ==
Year	Video
1990	"Hey Good Lookin'" (with Buckwheat Zydeco and Dwight Yoakam)
