= Louie Pérez =

American songwriter and musician

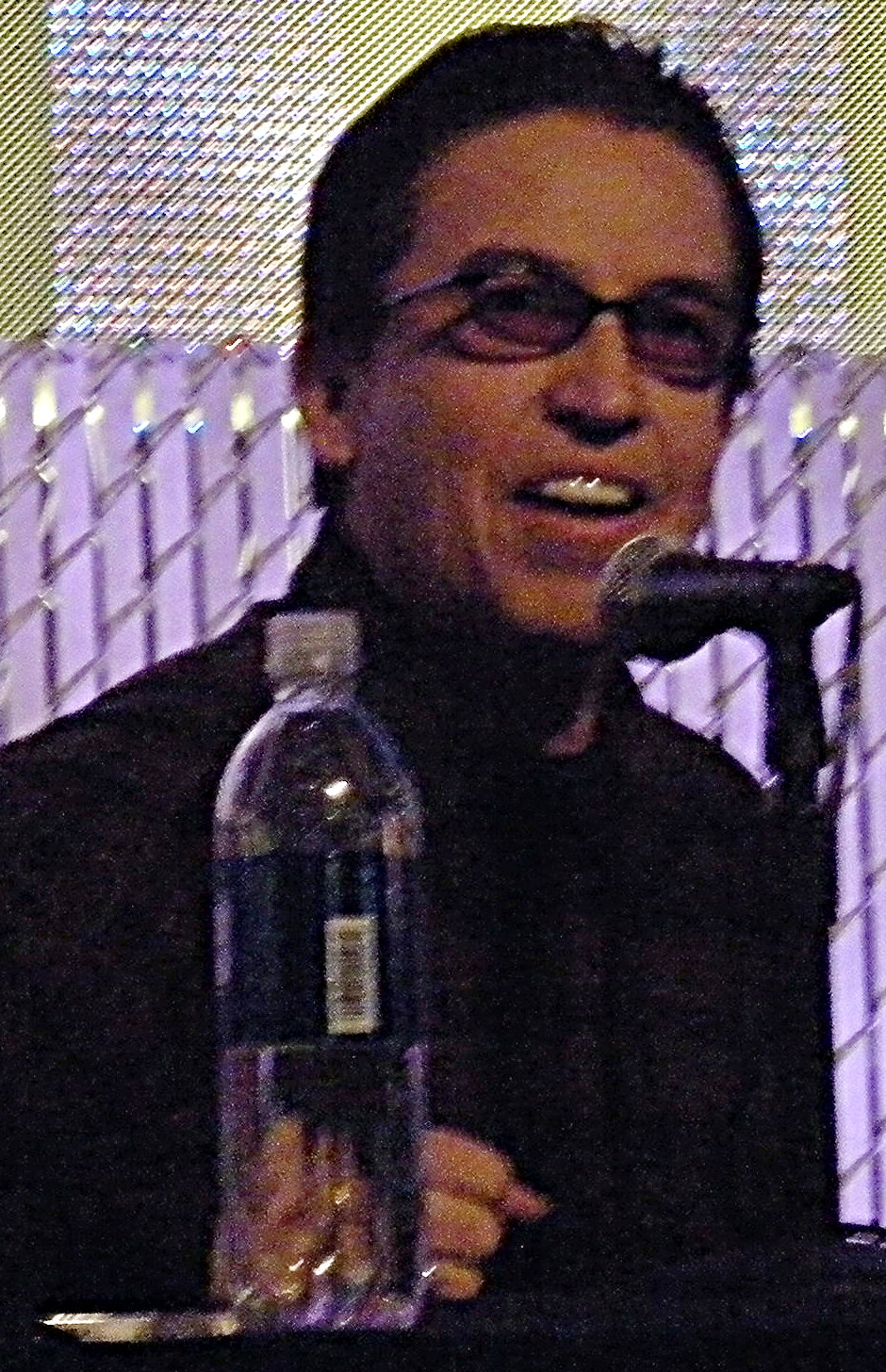
- Pérez in 2008
- Born: January 29, 1953 (age 73); Los Angeles, California
- Occupations: American musician and songwriter
- Spouse: Mary Savaglio Perez
- Children: Louis Perez III, John Perez, Matthew Perez
- Website: loslobos.org latinplayboys.org

Louis Frausto Pérez, Jr. (born January 29, 1953) is an American songwriter, percussionist and guitarist for Los Lobos and Latin Playboys.

Pérez started with Los Lobos playing primarily jarana (a small Mexican guitar) and singing. He is one of the founding members of Los Lobos, established in 1973. As Los Lobos ventured into Norteño music and rock, Pérez became the drummer, first with just a snare drum. In 1990, Victor Bisetti was hired to be a combination drum tech, drum coach and percussionist. As time went on, Bisetti took a more active role as drummer, allowing Pérez to move back to the front of the stage and start playing guitar. Bisetti was replaced in 2003 by Ruben (Cougar) Estrada. Estrada was replaced by Enrique "Bugs" Gonzalez in 2013. Estrada was replaced by drummer Fredo Ortiz in 2014.

Pérez continues to be Los Lobos' primary lyricist. He also paints in his free time and has been the art director and artistic supervisor on many of Los Lobos' albums.
