= Pet Sounds 50th Anniversary World Tour =

2016–19 concert tour by Brian Wilson

- Tour by Brian Wilson with Al Jardine and Blondie Chaplin
- Location: North America, Europe, Oceania, Asia
- Associated album: Pet Sounds
- Start date: March 26, 2016
- End date: June 21, 2019
- No. of shows: 155 in North America; 51 in Europe; 7 in Oceania; 6 in Asia; 219 total

The Pet Sounds 50th Anniversary World Tour was a worldwide concert tour by American musicians Brian Wilson, Al Jardine, and Blondie Chaplin held to commemorate the 50th anniversary of the Beach Boys' album Pet Sounds (1966). Scheduled for more than 100 dates, it marks Wilson and Jardine's final performances of the album.

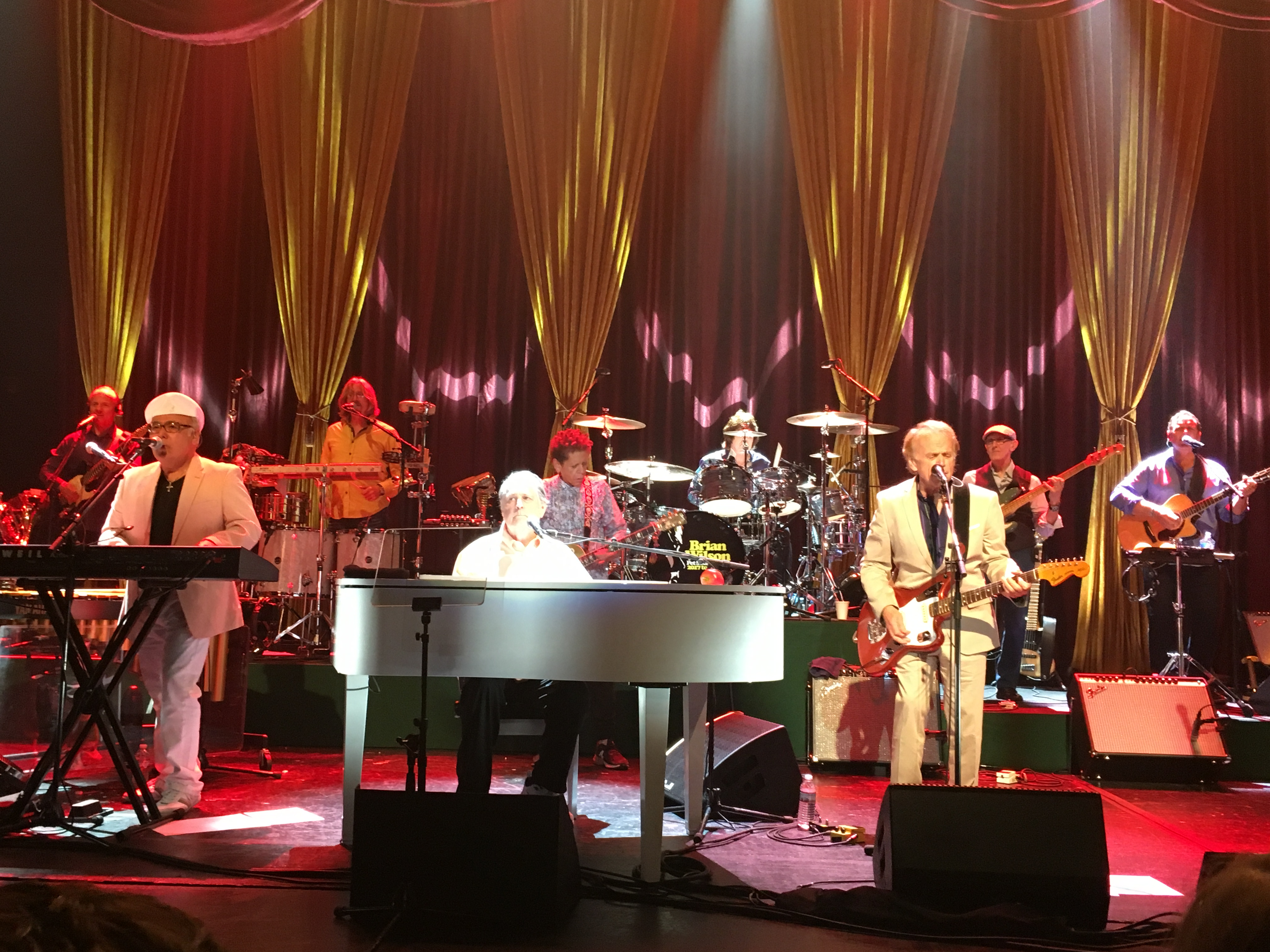
Brian Wilson and his band performing at The Lincoln Theatre in Washington, D.C. during the Pet Sounds 50th Anniversary World Tour.

== Background ==
Wilson's first (and previous) world tour of Pet Sounds was in 2000, backed by a different orchestra in each venue, and he also performed the entire album on three occasions without an orchestra on his 2002 tour. The concerts received favorable reviews, however, critics focused on Wilson's "trancelike" demeanor and odd interview responses. Recordings from Wilson's 2002 concert tour were released as Brian Wilson Presents Pet Sounds Live. Rolling Stone's Dorian Lynskey says that the shows helped establish the now-ubiquitous practice of artists playing "classic albums" in their entirety. In late 2006, Jardine joined Wilson and his band for a short tour celebrating the 40th anniversary of Pet Sounds.

In 2013, Wilson and Jardine performed the album at two shows, unannounced, also with original Beach Boys guitarist David Marks. In 2016, to celebrate the album's 50th anniversary, Wilson and Jardine performed the album on tour in Australia, Japan, Europe, Canada and the United States. The tour was planned as his final performances of the album, but occasional shows were performed through 2020. A concert reviewer noted that Wilson received a standing ovation every time he performed a track from the album.

== Set list ==
Songs performed

Surfin' Safari

- "409"

Surfin' U.S.A.

- "Shut Down"
- "Surfin' U.S.A."

Surfer Girl

- "In My Room"
- "Catch a Wave"
- "Hawaii"
- "Little Deuce Coupe"
- "Surfer Girl"

Shut Down Volume 2

- "Don't Worry Baby"
- "Fun, Fun, Fun"

All Summer Long

- "All Summer Long"
- "I Get Around"
- "Little Honda"
- "Hushabye"
- "Drive-In"

Beach Boys Concert

- "Monster Mash"
- "Johnny B. Goode"

Christmas Album

- "Little Saint Nick"

Today!

- "Dance, Dance, Dance"
- "Do You Wanna Dance?"
- "Please Let Me Wonder"
- "She Knows Me Too Well"

Summer Days (And Summer Nights!!)

- "California Girls"
- "Help Me, Rhonda"
- "Girl Don't Tell Me"
- "Salt Lake City"
- "Then I Kissed Her"
- "You're So Good to Me"
- "Let Him Run Wild"

Beach Boys' Party!

- "Barbara Ann"

Pet Sounds

- "Wouldn't It Be Nice"
- "You Still Believe in Me"
- "That's Not Me"
- "Don't Talk (Put Your Head on My Shoulder)"
- "I'm Waiting for the Day"
- "Let's Go Away for Awhile"
- "Sloop John B"
- "God Only Knows"
- "I Know There's an Answer"
- "Here Today"
- "I Just Wasn't Made for These Times"
- "Pet Sounds"
- "Caroline, No"

Smiley Smile/Smile

- "Good Vibrations"
- "Heroes and Villains"

Wild Honey

- "Darlin'"
- "Wild Honey"
- "Aren't You Glad"
- "Let the Wind Blow"
- "I'd Love Just Once to See You"

Friends

- "Wake the World"

20/20

- "Cotton Fields"
- "Do It Again"
- "Our Prayer"

Sunflower

- "Add Some Music to Your Day"

Surf's Up

- "Feel Flows"

Carl and the Passions – "So Tough"

- "All This is That"
- "Marcella"

Holland

- "California Saga: California"
- "Sail On, Sailor"
- "Funky Pretty"

15 Big Ones

- "Susie Cincinnati"

The Beach Boys Love You

- "Honkin' Down the Highway"
- "The Night Was So Young"

Brian Wilson

- "Love and Mercy"

No Pier Pressure

- "One Kind of Love"
- "Sail Away"

Miscellaneous

- "River Deep – Mountain High"

The following sets were played in Auckland, New Zealand on March 26, 2016.

Set one

1. "Our Prayer"
2. "Heroes and Villains"
3. "California Girls"
4. "Dance, Dance, Dance"
5. "I Get Around"
6. "Shut Down"
7. "Little Deuce Coupe"
8. "Then I Kissed Her"
9. "Wake the World"
10. "Add Some Music To Your Day"
11. "Honkin' Down the Highway"
12. "In My Room"
13. "Surfer Girl"
14. "Don’t Worry Baby"
15. "One Kind of Love"
16. "Funky Pretty"
17. "Wild Honey"
18. "Sail On, Sailor"

Set two

1. "Wouldn't It Be Nice"
2. "You Still Believe in Me"
3. "That's Not Me"
4. "Don't Talk (Put Your Head on My Shoulder)"
5. "I'm Waiting for the Day"
6. "Let's Go Away for Awhile"
7. "Sloop John B"
8. "God Only Knows"
9. "I Know There's an Answer"
10. "Here Today"
11. "I Just Wasn't Made for These Times"
12. "Pet Sounds"
13. "Caroline, No"
14. "Good Vibrations"

Encore

1. "All Summer Long"
2. "Help Me, Rhonda"
3. "Barbara Ann"
4. "Surfin’ USA"
5. "Fun Fun Fun"
6. "Love and Mercy"

== Tour dates ==
Date	City	Country	Venue
Oceania
March 26, 2016	Auckland	New Zealand	Auckland Civic Theatre
March 28, 2016	Byron Bay	Australia	Tyagarah Park (Byron Bay Bluesfest)
March 29, 2016	Sydney	Australia	Sydney Opera House
March 31, 2016	Sydney	Australia	Sydney Opera House
April 3, 2016	Melbourne	Australia	Palais Theatre
April 5, 2016	Adelaide	Australia	Adelaide Entertainment Centre
April 7, 2016	Perth	Australia	Riverside Theatre
Asia
April 12, 2016	Tokyo	Japan	Tokyo International Forum
April 13, 2016	Tokyo	Japan	Tokyo International Forum
April 15, 2016	Osaka	Japan	Orix Theater
North America
April 28, 2016	Jackson	United States	Thalia Mara Hall
~~April 30, 2016~~ (cancelled)	Austin	United States	Carson Creek Ranch (Levitation)
May 1, 2016	Grand Prairie	United States	Verizon Theatre at Grand Prairie
Europe
May 15, 2016	Bristol	England	Colston Hall
May 17, 2016	Birmingham	England	Birmingham Symphony Hall
May 18, 2016	Cardiff	Wales	St David's Hall
May 20, 2016	London	England	London Palladium
May 21, 2016	London	England	London Palladium
May 22, 2016	London	England	London Palladium
May 24, 2016	Manchester	England	O_{2} Apollo Manchester
May 26, 2016	Edinburgh	Scotland	Usher Hall
May 27, 2016	Glasgow	Scotland	Glasgow Royal Concert Hall
May 29, 2016	Gateshead	England	The Sage Gateshead
May 31, 2016	Liverpool	England	Philharmonic Hall
June 1, 2016	Nottingham	England	Nottingham Royal Concert Hall
June 4, 2016	Barcelona	Spain	Parc del Fòrum (Primavera Sound)
Asia
June 8, 2016	Raanana	Israel	Raanana Park
Europe
June 10, 2016	Porto	Portugal	Parque de Cidade (NOS Primavera Sound)
North America
June 12, 2016	Brooklyn	United States	McCarren Park
June 14, 2016	Burlington	United States	Flynn Center for the Performing Arts
June 15, 2016	Portland	United States	Merrill Auditorium
June 17, 2016	Boston	United States	Boston Symphony Hall
June 18, 2016	Boston	United States	Boston Symphony Hall
June 19, 2016	Lenox	United States	Koussevitzky Music Shed
June 30, 2016	San Diego	United States	Del Mar Fairgrounds
July 1, 2016	Las Vegas	United States	The Joint
July 3, 2016	Ottawa	Canada	Confederation Park (Ottawa Jazz Festival)
July 4, 2016	Toronto	Canada	Massey Hall
July 6, 2016	Burlington	United States	Flynn Center for the Performing Arts
July 7, 2016	Montréal	Canada	Salle Wilfrid-Pelletier (Montreal International Jazz Festival)
July 9, 2016	Phoenix	United States	Celebrity Theatre
July 10, 2016	Los Angeles	United States	Hollywood Bowl
July 15, 2016	Elizabeth	United States	Horseshoe Southern Indiana
July 16, 2016	Chicago	United States	Union Park (Pitchfork Music Festival)
July 17, 2016	Council Bluffs	United States	Harrah's Stir Cove
July 20, 2016	Kansas City	United States	Muriel Kauffman Theatre
July 21, 2016	St. Charles	United States	Family Arena
July 22, 2016	Tunica	United States	Horseshoe Casino Tunica
July 23, 2016	Bossier City	United States	Riverdome at Horseshoe Casino and Hotel
July 29, 2016	Paso Robles	United States	Chumash Grandstand Arena
August 16, 2016	Bowling Green	United States	SKyPAC
August 18, 2016	Asheville	United States	Thomas Wolfe Auditorium
August 19, 2016	Raleigh	United States	Duke Energy Center for the Performing Arts
August 20, 2016	Roanoke	United States	Elmwood Park
August 22, 2016	Newport News	United States	Ferguson Center for the Arts
August 23, 2016	Baltimore	United States	Hippodrome/The Trance-Merrick Performing Arts Center
August 25, 2016	Pittsburgh	United States	Benedum Center
August 27, 2016	Atlantic City	United States	Circus Maximus Theater
August 28, 2016	Gilford	United States	Bank of New Hampshire Pavilion at Meadowbrook
August 29, 2016	Syracuse	United States	New York State Fairgrounds
Europe
September 1, 2016	Randers	Denmark	Værket
September 3, 2016	Brighton	England	Preston Park (Together the People)
September 4, 2016	Southend-on-Sea	England	Cliffs Pavilion
September 6, 2016	Reykjavík	Iceland	Harpa
North America
September 9, 2016	Atlanta	United States	Fox Theatre
September 10, 2016	St. Augustine	United States	St. Augustine Amphitheatre
September 11, 2016	Sarasota	United States	Van Wezel Performing Arts Hall
September 13, 2016	St. Petersburg	United States	Mahaffey Theater
September 14, 2016	Hollywood	United States	Hard Rock Live
September 16, 2016	Nashville	United States	Ryman Auditorium
September 17, 2016	Nashville	United States	Ryman Auditorium
September 19, 2016	Charlotte	United States	Blumenthal Performing Arts Center
September 20, 2016	North Bethesda	United States	Music Hall at Strathmore
September 21, 2016	Red Bank	United States	Count Basie Theatre
September 23, 2016	Upper Darby	United States	Tower Theater
September 24, 2016	New York City	United States	Beacon Theatre
September 25, 2016	Easton	United States	State Theatre
September 27, 2016	Wallingford	United States	Toyota Oakdale Theatre
September 28, 2016	Buffalo	United States	University at Buffalo Center for the Arts
September 30, 2016	Detroit	United States	Fox Theatre
October 1, 2016	Chicago	United States	Chicago Theater
October 2, 2016	Minneapolis	United States	Orpheum Theatre
October 4, 2016	Denver	United States	Paramount Theatre
October 5, 2016	Salt Lake City	United States	Abravanel Hall
October 7, 2016	Portland	United States	Arlene Schnitzer Concert Hall
October 8, 2016	Seattle	United States	Paramount Theatre
October 10, 2016	Arcata	United States	John Van Duzer Theatre
October 12, 2016	San Francisco	United States	Nob Hill Masonic Center
October 13, 2016	San Francisco	United States	Nob Hill Masonic Center
October 14, 2016	Stateline	United States	Harrah's Lake Tahoe
October 15, 2016	Sacramento	United States	Community Theater
Europe
October 28, 2016	London	England	Royal Albert Hall
October 30, 2016	Paris	France	Salle Pleyel
October 31, 2016	Basel	Switzerland	Event Halle (Baloise Session)
Asia
November 3, 2016	Dubai	United Arab Emirates	Tennis Stadium
Europe
November 6, 2016	Oslo	Norway	Oslo Spektrum
November 7, 2016	Malmö	Sweden	Malmö Live Konserthus
North America
December 1, 2016	Monterrey	Mexico	Auditorio Pabellón M
December 3, 2016	Acapulco	Mexico	Hotel Pierre Mundo Imperial (Trópico)
March 18, 2017	Indio	United States	Fantasy Springs Resort Casino
March 27, 2017	Orlando	United States	Dr. Phillips Center for Performing Arts
March 29, 2017	New Orleans	United States	Saenger Performing Arts Theater
March 31, 2017	Durant	United States	Choctaw Grand Theater
April 1, 2017	Mayetta	United States	Prairie Band Casino & Resort
April 2, 2017	Wichita	United States	Hartman Arena
April 4, 2017	Fort Collins	United States	Lincoln Center
April 6, 2017	Boise	United States	Velma V. Morrison Center For The Performing Arts
April 8, 2017	Vancouver	Canada	Queen Elizabeth Theatre
April 9, 2017	Seattle	United States	Paramount Theatre
April 12, 2017	Edmonton	Canada	Northern Alberta Jubilee Auditorium
April 13, 2017	Calgary	Canada	Southern Alberta Jubilee Auditorium
April 15, 2017	Winnipeg	Canada	Burton Cummings Theatre
April 17, 2017	Sioux City	United States	Orpheum Theater
April 18, 2017	Des Moines	United States	Des Moines Civic Center
April 19, 2017	Milwaukee	United States	Riverside Theater
April 21, 2017	Columbus	United States	Palace Theatre
April 22, 2017	Northfield	United States	Hard Rock Rocksino Northfield Park
April 23, 2017	Indianapolis	United States	Murat Theatre
April 25, 2017	Hershey	United States	Hershey Theatre
April 26, 2017	Albany	United States	Palace Theatre
April 28, 2017	Newark	United States	Prudential Hall, New Jersey Performing Arts Center
April 29, 2017	Lynn	United States	The Lynn Memorial Auditorium
April 30, 2017	Worcester	United States	Hanover Theatre for the Performing Arts
May 2, 2017	Wilkes-Barre	United States	The F.M. Kirby Center for the Performing Arts
May 3, 2017	Washington, D.C.	United States	Lincoln Theatre
May 4, 2017	Washington, D.C.	United States	Lincoln Theatre
May 6, 2017	Knoxville	United States	Tennessee Theatre
May 7, 2017	Chattanooga	United States	Tivoli Theatre
May 9, 2017	Birmingham	United States	BJCC Concert Hall
May 12, 2017	Houston	United States	Revention Music Center
May 13, 2017	Austin	United States	The Moody Theater
May 14, 2017	Austin	United States	The Moody Theater
May 16, 2017	Tulsa	United States	Brady Theater
May 18, 2017	Albuquerque	United States	Kiva Auditorium
May 19, 2017	Tucson	United States	Centennial Hall – University of Arizona
May 20, 2017	Laughlin	United States	Rio Vista Outdoor Amphitheater @ Harrah's Laughlin
May 22, 2017	Phoenix	United States	Celebrity Theatre
May 24, 2017	San Diego	United States	Civic Theatre
May 26, 2017	Hollywood	United States	Pantages Theatre
May 27, 2017	Hollywood	United States	Pantages Theatre
May 28, 2017	Santa Barbara	United States	Santa Barbara Bowl
June 15, 2017	Honolulu	United States	Neal S. Blaisdell Concert Hall
June 16, 2017	Honolulu	United States	Duke Kahanamoku Lagoon
Europe
June 29, 2017	Odense	Denmark	Odeon
June 30, 2017	Copenhagen	Denmark	Tivoli Gardens
July 3, 2017	Amsterdam	Netherlands	Koninklijk Theater Carré
July 4, 2017	Ostend	Belgium	Casino Kursaal
July 5, 2017	Utrecht	Netherlands	TivoliVredenburg Grote Zaal
July 8, 2017	Bilbao	Spain	Kobetamendi (Bilbao BBK Live)
July 9, 2017	Montreux	Switzerland	Auditorium Stravinski (Montreux Jazz Festival)
July 13, 2017	Pori	Finland	Kirjurinluoto (Pori Jazz Festival)
July 15, 2017	Perugia	Italy	Arena Santa Giuliana (Umbria Jazz Festival)
July 17, 2017	Lyon	France	Théâtre Antique de Fourvière (Les Nuits de Fourvière)
July 19, 2017	Frankfurt	Germany	Jahrhunderthalle
July 20, 2017	Vienna	Austria	Wiener Stadthalle
July 23, 2017	Galway	Ireland	Absolute Big Top (Galway Arts Festival)
July 25, 2017	Dublin	Ireland	Bord Gais Energy Theatre
July 28, 2017	Liverpool	England	Exhibition Centre
July 29, 2017	Penrith	England	Lowther Deer Park (Kendal Calling)
July 30, 2017	Dorset	England	Lulworth Castle (Camp Bestival)
August 1, 2017	London	England	Eventim Apollo
August 2, 2017	Sheffield	England	Sheffield City Hall
August 3, 2017	Glasgow	Scotland	Kelvingrove Bandstand
August 5, 2017	Glastonbury	England	Glastonbury Abbey (Glastonbury Extravaganza)
August 6, 2017	Newcastle	England	Times Square (Live from Times Square)
North America
August 26, 2017	Lincoln	United States	Thunder Valley Casino Resort
September 15, 2017	Moncton	Canada	The Molson Canadian Centre
September 16, 2017	Halifax	Canada	Scotiabank Centre
September 18, 2017	Kitchener	Canada	Centre in The Square
September 19, 2017	Rochester	United States	University of Rochester – Kodak Hall at Eastman Theatre
September 21, 2017	Mashantucket	United States	The Grand Theater at Foxwoods
September 22, 2017	Boston	United States	Orpheum Theatre
September 23, 2017	New York City	United States	Radio City Music Hall
September 25, 2017	Lancaster	United States	American Music Theatre
September 26, 2017	Red Bank	United States	Count Basie Theatre
September 29, 2017	New Bedford	United States	The Zeiterion Performing Arts Center
September 30, 2017	Atlantic City	United States	Golden Nugget
October 1, 2017	Syracuse	United States	The Oncenter Crouse Hinds Theater
October 3, 2017	South Bend	United States	Morris Performing Arts Center
October 4, 2017	Toledo	United States	Stranahan Theater
October 6, 2017	Rosemont	United States	Rosemont Theatre
October 7, 2017	Florence	United States	Belterra Casino Resort and Spa
October 8, 2017	Peoria	United States	Peoria Civic Center
October 12, 2017	Fresno	United States	Big Fresno Fair
October 13, 2017	Saratoga	United States	Mountain Winery
October 14, 2017	Costa Mesa	United States	Pacific Amphitheatre
July 19, 2018	Morristown	United States	Mayo Performing Arts Center
July 22, 2018	Kingston	United States	Ulster Performing Arts Centre
July 24, 2018	Wilmington	United States	Wilson Center-Cape Fear Stage
July 25, 2018	North Charleston	United States	North Charleston Performing Arts Center
Asia
August 7, 2018	Tel Aviv	Israel	Heichal HaTarbut
Europe
August 9, 2018	Cropredy	England	Festival Site
August 11, 2018	Taormina	Italy	Teatro Greco
August 16, 2018	Berlin	Germany	Admiralspalast
August 19, 2018	Edinburgh	Scotland	Edinburgh Playhouse
August 24, 2018	Birmingham	England	Digbeth Arena
August 25, 2018	Portsmouth	England	Southsea Common
North America
October 27, 2018	Bangor	United States	Cross Insurance Center
November 2, 2018	Richmond	United States	Dominion Arts Center
November 3, 2018	Bensalem	United States	Parx Casino: Xcite Center
November 5, 2018	Washington, D.C.	United States	The Kennedy Center
November 6, 2018	Huntington	United States	Keith Albee Performing Arts Center
November 8, 2018	Atlanta	United States	Fox Theatre
November 9, 2018	Augusta	United States	The Bell Auditorium
November 10, 2018	Clearwater	United States	Ruth Eckerd Hall
November 16, 2018	Louisville	United States	Louisville Palace
November 20, 2018	Grand Rapids	United States	DeVos Performance Hall
November 21, 2018	Toronto	Canada	Sony Centre for the Performing Arts
November 23, 2018	Ottawa	Canada	TD Place
November 25, 2018	Windsor	Canada	The Colosseum at Caesars Windsor
June 7, 2019	Lynn	United States	Lynn Auditorium
June 8, 2019	Concord	United States	Chubb Theater at CCA
June 9, 2019	Burlington	United States	Flynn Theatre
June 11, 2019	Red Bank	United States	Count Basie Theatre
June 12, 2019	Baltimore	United States	Hippodrome Theatre
June 15, 2019	Lewiston	United States	Artpark Mainstage Theater
June 16, 2019	Lenox	United States	Tanglewood Music Center
June 18, 2019	Huber Heights	United States	Rose Music Center at The Heights
June 20, 2019	Nashville	United States	Schermerhorn Symphony Center
June 21, 2019	Nashville	United States	Schermerhorn Symphony Center
June 23, 2019	Aurora	United States	RiverEdge Park

== Personnel ==
Current members:

- Brian Wilson – vocals, piano
- Al Jardine – vocals, guitar, banjo, percussion
- Mike D'amico – drums, percussion
- Bob Lizik – bass guitar
- Nelson Bragg – vocals, percussion
- Probyn Gregory – vocals, guitar, trumpet, French horn, theremin, trombone
- Matt Jardine – vocals, guitar, percussion
- Rob Bonfiglio – vocals, guitar, percussion (substituted for Matt Jardine, then replaced Wonder)
- Gary Griffin – vocals, keyboards, vibraphone
- Darian Sahanaja – vocals, keyboards, vibraphone
- Paul Von Mertens – vocals, saxophone, flute, clarinet, harmonica
- Blondie Chaplin – vocals, guitar, percussion

Special Guests:

Billy Hinsche – keyboards, vocals

Former members:

- Nicky Wonder – vocals, guitar (died August 6, 2019)
- Jim Laspesa – vocals, percussion (substitute for Nelson Bragg)
- Casey McDonough – vocals (substitute for Matt Jardine)

== Absences and Lineup Changes ==
Darian was present at the start of the tour in March and April 2016 for the New Zealand, Australia, and Japan shows, but was subsequently absent from the tour. In his absence, various musicians filled in the vocals/keyboards spot. On July 10, 2016, both Billy Hinsche and Darian Sahanaja played the show with Billy playing the first set, Darian playing the second set, and both musicians playing the encore. Darian permanently rejoined the tour in May 2017.

In April 2017, Casey McDonough of NRBQ filled in for Matt Jardine for a few shows. For most of 2018 & 2019, Jim Laspesa filled in for Nelson Bragg. In November & December 2018, Rob Bonfiglio filled in for Matt Jardine.

In September, 2017, Gary Griffin was absent from the band's shown in Kitchener, Ontario. He returned for future shows after that.

On August 6, 2019, Nicky Wonder died at the age of 59. He was replaced by Rob Bonfiglio.
