= The Beach Boys in Concert =

Live album by the Beach Boys
- Released: November 19, 1973
- Recorded: August 1972 – September 3, 1973
- Genre: Rock
- Length: 75:49
- Label: Brother/Reprise
- Producer: The Beach Boys

The Beach Boys chronology
Holland (1973)	The Beach Boys in Concert (1973)	Endless Summer (1974)

The Beach Boys in Concert is the third live album by American rock band the Beach Boys, released in November 1973. It was their first live album since Live in London (1970), as well as the only live album and the final album on which Blondie Chaplin and Ricky Fataar appeared as official members.

== Reception ==
Professional ratings
Review scores
Source	Rating
AllMusic	4/5 stars
Blender	3/5 stars
Encyclopedia of Popular Music	2/5 stars
MusicHound	3.5/5
Rolling Stone	(favorable)
The Rolling Stone Album Guide	3/5 stars

The Beach Boys in Concert gave the band their best chart peak since 1967's Wild Honey by reaching number 25, and earning them their first gold record since 1966's Best of The Beach Boys.

== Track listing ==
Side one
No.	Title	Writer(s)	Recording date and venue	Length
1.	"Sail On, Sailor"	Brian Wilson, Tandyn Almer, Ray Kennedy, Jack Rieley, Van Dyke Parks	April 20, 1973 - Hollywood Palladium, Los Angeles, CA	3:21
2.	"Sloop John B"	traditional, arr. Wilson	April 20, 1973 - Hollywood Palladium, Los Angeles, CA	3:12
3.	"The Trader"	Carl Wilson, Rieley	September 3, 1973 - Pine Knob Amphitheater, Clarkston, MI	4:46
4.	"You Still Believe in Me"	B. Wilson, Tony Asher	August 31, 1973 - Syria Mosque, Pittsburgh, PA	2:58
5.	"California Girls"	B. Wilson, Love	August 19, 1973 - Nassau Coliseum, Uniondale, NY	2:57
6.	"Darlin'"	B. Wilson, Love	September 1, 1973 - Century Theatre, Buffalo, NY	2:21

Side two
No.	Title	Writer(s)	Recording date and venue	Length
7.	"Marcella"	B. Wilson, Almer, Rieley	November 19, 1972 - Capitol Theatre, Passaic, NJ	3:55
8.	"Caroline, No"	B. Wilson, Asher	August 18, 1973 - The Mosque, Richmond, VA	3:04
9.	"Leaving This Town"	C. Wilson, Ricky Fataar, Blondie Chaplin, Love	August 19, 1973 - Nassau Coliseum, Uniondale, NY	6:59
10.	"Heroes and Villains"	B. Wilson, Parks	August 18, 1973 - The Mosque, Richmond, VA	3:51

Side three
No.	Title	Writer(s)	Recording date and venue	Length
11.	"Funky Pretty"	B. Wilson, Rieley, Love	August 31, 1973 - Syria Mosque, Pittsburgh, PA	4:04
12.	"Let the Wind Blow"	B. Wilson, Love	November 19, 1972 - Capitol Theatre, Passaic, NJ	4:22
13.	"Help Me, Rhonda"	B. Wilson, Love	September 3, 1973 - Pine Knob Amphitheater, Clarkston, MI	4:59
14.	"Surfer Girl"	B. Wilson	September 3, 1973 - Pine Knob Amphitheater, Clarkston, MI	2:35
15.	"Wouldn't It Be Nice"	B. Wilson, Asher, Love	November 19, 1972 - Capitol Theatre, Passaic, NJ	2:45

Side four
No.	Title	Writer(s)	Recording date and venue	Length
16.	"We Got Love"	Fataar, Chaplin, Love	August 19, 1973 - Nassau Coliseum, Uniondale, NY	5:25
17.	"Don't Worry Baby"	B. Wilson, Roger Christian	November 19, 1972 - Capitol Theatre, Passaic, NJ	3:11
18.	"Surfin' U.S.A."	Chuck Berry, B. Wilson	August 31, 1973 - Syria Mosque, Pittsburgh, PA	2:49
19.	"Good Vibrations"	B. Wilson, Love	November 19, 1972 - Capitol Theatre, Passaic, NJ	4:49
20.	"Fun, Fun, Fun"	B. Wilson, Love		3:16
Total length:				75:49

== Personnel ==
The Beach Boys

- Carl Wilson – vocals, lead guitar, electric piano
- Dennis Wilson – vocals, electric piano
- Al Jardine – vocals, rhythm guitar
- Mike Love – vocals
- Blondie Chaplin – vocals, guitars, bass
- Ricky Fataar – vocals, drums

Additional personnel

- Ed Carter – bass, guitars
- Billy Hinsche – vocals, guitar, keyboards
- Robert Kenyatta – percussion
- Mike Kowalski – drums, percussion
- Carli Muñoz – keyboards
- Joe Pollard – percussion on "Sail On, Sailor" and "Sloop John B"
- Richard Didymus Washington – percussion on "Sail On, Sailor" and "Sloop John B"

== Bibliography ==
- Badman, Keith (2004). The Beach Boys: The Definitive Diary of America's Greatest Band, on Stage and in the Studio. Backbeat Books. ISBN 978-0-87930-818-6.
