= Child of Winter (Christmas Song) =

Single by the Beach Boys
- B-side: "Susie Cincinnati"
- Released: December 23, 1974
- Recorded: November 18, 1974
- Genre: Christmas
- Length: 2:50
- Label: Brother/Reprise (1321)
- Songwriters: Brian Wilson, Steve Kalinich
- Producer: Brian Wilson

The Beach Boys singles chronology
"California Saga/California" (1973)	"Child of Winter (Christmas Song)" (1974)	"Sail On, Sailor" (1975)

"Child of Winter (Christmas Song)" is a song by American rock band the Beach Boys that was released as a standalone single on December 23, 1974. Written by Brian Wilson and Stephen Kalinich, it was the only Beach Boys single issued between the albums Holland and 15 Big Ones. The B-side was "Susie Cincinnati".

== Background ==
In a 1997 interview, Kalinich said of the song,

Brian and I decided we wanted to do a children's song and we somehow combined "Here Comes Santa Claus" with Gene Autry; I came up with this lyric about a child of winter and Brian put music to it, and then we went in to Brother Studio and recorded it. ... We just wanted to do a Christmas album. I remember I wanted to release this, but the Beach Boys didn't think there were enough harmonies, and they kind of sabotaged a major release.

== Recording ==
An early version with Dennis Wilson on lead vocals and Carl Wilson singing the bridge is reported to exist.

== Release history ==
When released in other countries, the single featured the live version of "Good Vibrations" from The Beach Boys in Concert as a B-side.

"Child of Winter (Christmas Song)" was included on the band's 1998 compilation Ultimate Christmas.

== Personnel ==
Per Stephen Kalinich.

The Beach Boys

- Mike Love – lead vocal
- Brian Wilson – "Grinch voice", "everything else"
- Carl Wilson – guitar
- Dennis Wilson – drums

Additional personnel

- Carnie Wilson – sleigh bell
- Wendy Wilson – sleigh bell
- Stephen Kalinich – kazoo
