= California Feelin' =

Song written by Brian Wilson and Stephen Kalinich

Song by Brian Wilson

from the album Classics Selected by Brian Wilson
- Released: July 2, 2002
- Recorded: 2002
- Genre: White gospel
- Length: 2:49
- Label: Capitol
- Songwriters: Brian Wilson; Stephen Kalinich
- Producer: Brian Wilson

Licensed audio
- "California Feelin'" on YouTube

"California Feelin'" is a song written by Brian Wilson and Stephen Kalinich that was recorded by the Beach Boys in the early 1970s and recorded for the first time from Brian Wilson on November 12, 1974. Wilson recorded a solo version in 2002 for the Beach Boys compilation Classics Selected by Brian Wilson. Wilson’s bandmate Al Jardine later recorded his own version for his debut solo album A Postcard from California. Two composite versions of the Beach Boys' original recordings – one complete and the other a piano/vocal demo – were included on the 2013 compilation Made in California.

"California Feelin'"

Song by Al Jardine

from the album A Postcard from California
- Released: 2010
- Genre: White gospel
- Label: Fontana
- Songwriters: Brian Wilson; Stephen Kalinich
- Producer: Al Jardine

== Background ==
The song was written by Brian Wilson and Stephen Kalinich for Wilson's American Spring side project. Kalinich considered the song white gospel and added "I think it frightened him a little to let his defenses down and give the vocal all he had." In 1976, Wilson said of the song, "It's got a feeling to it. ... There's something about it that's very warm. It's sort of a Bill Medley–Brian Wilson combination."

== Recording ==
It was first tracked as a demo in November 1974 by Brian Wilson in a session that was engineered by Chuck Britz. Wilson, unhappy with his performance, instructed the engineer to scrap the tape, but this was not heeded. The Beach Boys' 1974 and 1978 versions of "California Feelin'" were eventually released for the 2013 compilation Made in California. Compiler Alan Boyd explained:

That was one of the first songs recorded for the L.A. (Light Album) in 1978 at Criteria, the Bee Gees studio, in Miami. A rough mix has been circulating for many years but we did a little track editing and pulled some things out on it. I’ve always loved the song and there are multiple versions of it out there. There’s a version by The Honeys, Brian (Wilson) has recorded it. But we’re finally getting the Beach Boys master out. It features a beautiful vocal by Carl. The song almost has a gospel tinge to it. We even used part of Brian’s original first attempt at a lead vocal on it too, which no one has heard.

== Music video ==
An official music video was released in 2014. It was the winner of a fan contest devised during the promotion of Made in California.

== Personnel ==
Credits from Craig Slowinski.

The Beach Boys

- Al Jardine - backing vocals
- Bruce Johnston - co-lead and backing vocals
- Mike Love - backing vocals
- Brian Wilson - lead (intro) and backing vocals, piano
- Carl Wilson - lead and backing vocals, electric guitar

Additional musicians

- Ed Carter - bass guitar
- Bobby Figueroa - drums, tambourine
- Carli Muñoz - Fender Rhodes electric piano
- Phil Shenale - Oberheim synthesizers
- Sterling Smith - Hammond organ
