= Classics Selected by Brian Wilson =

Classics selected by Brian Wilson

Compilation album by The Beach Boys
- Released: July 2, 2002
- Recorded: June 1963–November 1972, Except "California Feelin' ": Spring 2002
- Genre: Rock
- Length: 56:57
- Label: Capitol
- Producer: Brian Wilson and Carl Wilson
- Compiler: Brian Wilson

The Beach Boys chronology
Hawthorne, CA (2001)	Classics selected by Brian Wilson (2002)	Good Timin': Live at Knebworth England 1980 (2002)

Professional ratings
Review scores
Source	Rating
AllMusic	4.5/5 stars
Blender	4/5 stars
Encyclopedia of Popular Music	4/5 stars

Classics selected by Brian Wilson is a compilation of songs by The Beach Boys and released through Capitol Records in mid-2002. It was compiled by Brian Wilson himself that February. It includes a new recording of an unreleased 1970s track, "California Feelin'" not by The Beach Boys but Wilson and his live band.

Brian wrote in the liner notes:

Picking just 19 Beach Boys favorites is one of the hardest things I ever had to do. If you asked me tomorrow I would probably want to include "Kiss Me, Baby", "Salt Lake City", "Girl Don't Tell Me", "The Little Girl I Once Knew", "At My Window" and, from Holland, "Funky Pretty" & "Mount Vernon and Fairway". Blondie Chaplin's vocal on the fadeout to "Funky Pretty" is sensational. But here's my list as of today... Brian Wilson's 19 favorites on February 11, 2002.

Wilson's choices tend to favor his ballads, from "Surfer Girl" and "The Warmth of the Sun" to his Pet Sounds and Smile material. Later song selections include "'Til I Die" and "Sail On, Sailor".

Classics selected by Brian Wilson briefly made the US charts, reaching number 159 during a chart stay of 1 week.

== Track listing ==
All tracks use stereo mixes available at the time. Thus, tracks 3, 9 and 10 are in mono.

1. "Surfer Girl" (Brian Wilson) – 2:26
  - "I have to include this one. The first song I ever wrote. I started humming it in my car, then finished it when I got home. It’s a very spiritual song. We recorded it a few times, but this version comes from the Surfer Girl album."
2. "The Warmth of the Sun" (Brian Wilson, Mike Love) – 2:52
  - "I wrote this in honor of President John F. Kennedy. He was assassinated on November 22, 1963, and that night, Mike and I got together at my office in Hollywood and wrote the song."
3. "I Get Around" (Brian Wilson, Mike Love) – 2:12
  - "The Beach Boys' very first Number One hit. To me, it has a special social lyric, a dynamic arrangement. It's a very commercial record."
4. "Don't Worry, Baby" (Brian Wilson, Roger Christian) – 2:47
  - "The b-side for "I Get Around". When I wrote this one, I was inspired by "Be My Baby". A special, sweet song. My voice sounded very young on that one."
5. "In My Room" (Brian Wilson, Gary Usher) – 2:11
  - "My brothers Carl and Dennis and I used to sing three-part harmony in our room when we were kids. Songs like "Come down, come down/From your ivory tower". "In My Room" was a song that I taught them to sing, and it really has the feel of what it was like in our room when we were kids."
6. "California Girls" (Brian Wilson, Mike Love) – 2:45
  - "My favorite Beach Boys records. A wonderful bass line... I would say that it's probably the Beach Boys anthem."
  - Uses Endless Harmony Soundtrack stereo remix, 2000 Mark Linnet version
7. "God Only Knows" (Brian Wilson, Tony Asher) – 2:52
  - "This song was written really quickly... probably in less than an hour. It's an honor to have written this one. It was also a pretty controversial record in that, as far as I know, it was the first rock song to have "God" in the title. It's a love song, but not a love song to a person."
  - Uses The Pet Sounds Sessions stereo remix
8. "Caroline, No" (Brian Wilson, Tony Asher) – 2:17
  - "This was the last cut on Pet Sounds. It represents the sweetest I can sing."
  - Uses The Pet Sounds Sessions stereo remix, without the passing train/barking dogs coda
9. "Good Vibrations" (Brian Wilson, Mike Love) – 3:36
  - "Derek Taylor called it a "pocket symphony". To me, it was really a production achievement."
10. "Wonderful" (Brian Wilson, Van Dyke Parks) – 2:21
  - "A happy, beautiful song that makes you feel enlightened."
  - Smiley Smile version
11. "Heroes and Villains" (Brian Wilson, Van Dyke Parks) – 3:38
  - "I'm so proud of Van Dyke Parks' lyrics, and I think the music is inspiring to listen to."
  - Uses Hawthorne, CA stereo remix
12. "Surf's Up" (Brian Wilson, Van Dyke Parks) – 4:12
  - "Another amazing lyric from Van Dyke. Pure poetry set to music."
13. "Busy Doin' Nothin'" (Brian Wilson) – 3:03
  - "I wrote that song about a typical day in my life – a special lyric and Brian Wilson vocal."
14. "We're Together Again" (Ron Wilson) – 1:46
  - "This song was recorded in the late 1960s, and for some reason, it didn't get onto an album. I always liked it a lot and was glad when it was included on the 'Friends/20/20' two-fer. By the way, that's me singing the lead up high."
  - Non-album B-side, available on Friends/20/20 twofer CD
15. "Time to Get Alone" (Brian Wilson) – 2:37
  - "This is one that I wrote for Redwood, the vocal group that I signed to Brother because I thought they were gonna be the next big thing. After it was cut, The Beach Boys decided that they should do it instead. Redwood changed their name and their version finally came out a few years ago on a Three Dog Night "Best Of" CD."
16. "This Whole World" (Brian Wilson) – 1:56
  - "A very special vocal by Carl, and the lyrics are very spiritual. The melody and chord pattern rambles but it comes back to where it started."
17. "Marcella" (Brian Wilson, Jack Rieley) – 3:53
  - "It represents one of the first times we tried to emulate The Rolling Stones. In my mind, it was dedicated to the Stones, but I never told them that. It's one of the rockingest songs I ever wrote."
18. "Sail On, Sailor" (Brian Wilson, Van Dyke Parks, Tandyn Almer, Ray Kennedy, Jack Rieley) – 3:18
  - "Van Dyke really inspired this one. We worked on it originally; then, the other collaborators contributed some different lyrics. By the time the Beach Boys recorded it, the lyrics were all over the place. But I love how this song rocks."
19. "'Til I Die" (Brian Wilson) – 2:41
  - "Wow. This is a really sad one. I was going through some tough times and this song just came out. I think it really speaks for itself."
20. "California Feelin'" (Brian Wilson, Stephen Kalinich) – 2:49
  - "California Feelin'" is a special song written in the early '70s, originally for the Beach Boys; although never officially recorded or released by the Boys, it has always been a favorite of mine. So a few months ago, I took my new band into the studio and I think we accomplished what we set out to do, that being putting a lot of love in this song with our voices. I hope you like it as much as I liked recording it for you. Brian Wilson."
  - Written in 1974 and unreleased by The Beach Boys, this new version is by Brian Wilson in 2002 and backed by his live band

== Personnel ==
- Herb Agner – Project Manager
- Kevin Flaherty – A&R
- Joe Gastwirt – Mastering
- Mark Linett – Compilation Engineer
- Kazunori Uemura – Package Design
- Brian Wilson – Producer, Selection
- Carl Wilson – Producer
- Satoru Yonekawa – Package Design

== Charts ==
Chart (2013)	Peak position
US Billboard 200	159
