= Funky Pretty =

Single by the Beach Boys

from the album Holland
- A-side: "California Saga/California"
- Released: April 16, 1973
- Recorded: 1972
- Genre: R&B
- Length: 4:09
- Label: Brother
- Songwriter(s): Brian Wilson; Mike Love; Jack Rieley
- Producer(s): The Beach Boys

The Beach Boys singles chronology
"Sail On, Sailor" (1973)	"Funky Pretty" (1973)	"Child of Winter (Christmas Song)" (1974)

"Funky Pretty" is a song by American rock band the Beach Boys from their January 1973 album Holland. Themed around astrology, the song was written by Brian Wilson, Mike Love, and Jack Rieley. Carl Wilson explained that the song was quickly recorded in a "spontaneous flurry". Brian was an active participant in its production, a rare occurrence at the time. In April 1973, it was issued as the B-side to their single "California Saga/California".

== Background ==
Rolling Stone wrote of the song in its review of Holland:

"Funky Pretty" is more on the guttural side of R&B. A cosmic love song to an astrological lovely, it mounts its grit in a swirl of harmonic complications, again underlining Blondie Chaplin's more straightforward vocal dexterity with a defiantly baroque choral signature: Vivaldi meets the Regents on a magic synthesizer. It makes for a beautiful track, built on economical and even monotonous musical premises that delight in their unreasonably complex development.

Asked about the song in a 2013 interview, manager Jack Rieley said:

That was the test of Brian’s commitment to the idea that Bruce Johnston's not in the band, but Blondie and Ricky are. Funky Pretty is, to me, the modern Beach Boys because Mike, Carl, Brian and Blondie sing. Carl was doing funky songs as far back as to when he covered I Was Made to Love Her by Stevie Wonder on Wild Honey. It was in his bones and his blood.

Drummer Ricky Fataar remembered,

I think [Brian] might even be playing drums on the song. I missed playing on that because I was sick. I had a cold or something that week. I didn't see Brian all that much. I can't even remember seeing him in the studio in Holland. Everyone had their own family situation and we'd just go to work and occasionally see each other. It wasn't like a one-big-family thing.

Guitarist Blondie Chaplin stated,

On "Funky Pretty", Brian came down while we were trying to work out the vocals and he was doing a mix that I thought was even better than what eventually came out on the record.

== Personnel ==
Credits from Craig Slowinski, John Brode, Will Crerar and Joshilyn Hoisington.

The Beach Boys

- Blondie Chaplin - lead (chorus) and backing vocals
- Al Jardine - lead (chorus) vocals
- Mike Love - lead (chorus) and backing vocals
- Brian Wilson - backing vocals, upright piano, drums, congas, Moog synthesizers, producer
- Carl Wilson - lead (verse and bridge) and backing vocals, electric guitar, producer

Additional musicians

- Billy Hinsche - backing vocals
- Diane Rovell - backing vocals
- Marilyn Wilson - backing vocals

== Cover versions ==
- 2012 – Christopher Holland, Corner Green
