= Paradise in Distress =

Studio album by Golden Earring
- Released: 12 April 1999
- Recorded: 1999
- Genre: Hard rock
- Length: 67:29
- Label: Import
- Producer: Golden Earring; John Sonneveld

Golden Earring chronology
Naked II (1997)	Paradise in Distress (1999)	Last Blast of the Century (2001)

Professional ratings
Review scores
Source	Rating
Allmusic	link

Paradise in Distress is the twenty-third album by Dutch hard rock band Golden Earring, released in 1999 (see 1999 in music). The album was not issued in the U.S.

== Track listing ==
All songs written by Hay and Kooymans except where noted.

1. "Paradise in Distress" – 5:42
2. "Apocalypse" – 4:53
3. "Evil Love Chain" (Hay, Kooymans, E.H. Roelfzema) – 4:16
4. "Darling" – 5:27
5. "Take My Hand-Close My Eyes" – 4:48
6. "The Fighter" – 7:24
7. "One Night Without You" – 4:32
8. "Whisper in a Crowd" – 3:37
9. "Deja Voodoo" (Hay, Kooymans, Roelfzema) – 5:49
10. "Bad News to Fall in Love" (Hay, Kooymans, Roelfzema) – 5:08
11. "42nd Street" (Hay, Kooymans, Roelfzema) – 3:00
12. "Fluid Conduction" – 4:10
13. "Desperately Trying to Be Different" (Hay, Kooymans, Roelfzema) – 4:08
14. "Gambler's Blues" (Hay, Kooymans, Roelfzema) – 4:35

== Personnel ==
Golden Earring

- Barry Hay – lead vocals, guitars
- George Kooymans – guitars, vocals
- Rinus Gerritsen – bass, mouth harp
- Cesar Zuiderwijk – drums

Additional musicians

- Birgit Lewis Gospel Train – choir (1)
- Nico Brandsen – Hammond organ (1, 7, 10), strings (6), piano (8)
- Alaor Soares – percussion (2–4, 7, 10)
- André Sommer – pedal steel guitar (3, 4, 8)
- Bertus Borges – saxophone (3, 5)
- Frans Blanker – saxophone (3, 5)
- Gerbrand Westveen – saxophone (3, 5)
- Philip Colb – saxophone (3, 5)
- Roland Brunt – saxophone (3, 5)
- Sacha de Brun – backing vocals (5, 7)
- Simone Roerade – backing vocals (5, 7)
- John Sonneveld – strings (14)

== Production ==
- Producers: Golden Earring, John Sonneveld
- Engineer: John Sonneveld
- Mastering: Miles Showell
- Saxophone arrangement: Hans Hollestelle

== Charts ==
=== Weekly charts ===
Chart (1999)	Peak position
Dutch Albums (Album Top 100)	5

=== Year-end charts ===
Chart (1999)	Position
Dutch Albums (Album Top 100)	87

== Certifications ==
Region	Certification	Certified units/sales
Netherlands (NVPI)	Gold	50,000^{^}
^{^} Shipments figures based on certification alone.
