= Disconnected in New York City =

Live album by Los Lobos
- Released: October 22, 2013
- Recorded: December 2012
- Genre: Chicano rock; roots rock; blues rock; Heartland rock; Americana; Tex-Mex; Latin rock
- Label: 429
- Producer: Los Lobos

Los Lobos chronology
Tin Can Trust (2010)	Disconnected in New York City (2013)	Gates of Gold (2015)

Professional ratings
Review scores
Source	Rating
AllMusic	3.5/5 stars
Record Collector	3/5 stars

Disconnected in New York City is a 2013 live album by Los Lobos.

== Track listing ==
1. Intro
2. "The Neighborhood"
3. "Oh Yeah"
4. "Chuco's Cumbia"
5. "Tears of God"
6. "Venganza"
7. "Tin Can Trust"
8. "Gotta Let You Know"
9. "Maria Christina"
10. "Malaque"
11. "Little Things"
12. "Set Me Free Rosa Lee"
13. "La Bamba/Good Lovin'" - Medley
