= Love Sweat =

Studio album by Golden Earring
- Released: 8 December 1995
- Recorded: 1995
- Genre: Hard rock
- Length: 48:47
- Label: Columbia

Golden Earring chronology
Face It (1994)	Love Sweat (1995)	Naked II (1997)

Love Sweat is the twenty-second album by Dutch hard rock band Golden Earring, released in 1995. It contains covers of other artists' songs. The album was not issued in the U.S.

Professional ratings
Review scores
Source	Rating
Allmusic	link

== Track listing ==
1. "When I Was Young" (Vic Briggs, Eric Burdon, Barry Jenkins, Danny McCulloch, John Weider) - 3:10
2. "Darkness, Darkness" (Jesse Colin Young) - 3:54
3. "Gotta See Jane" (Eddie Holland, Ronald Miller, R. Dean Taylor) - 3:15
4. "My Little Red Book" (Burt Bacharach, Hal David) - 2:50
5. "Sail on, Sailor" (Brian Wilson, Van Dyke Parks, Tandyn Almer, Ray Kennedy, Jack Rieley) - 3:19
6. "Motorbikin'" (Chris Spedding) - 2:55
7. "I'll Be Back Again" (John Lennon, Paul McCartney) - 3:37
8. "This Wheel's on Fire" (Rick Danko, Bob Dylan) - 4:02
9. "Ballad of a Thin Man" (Dylan) - 5:07
10. "Collage" (Patrick Cullie, Joe Walsh) - 3:36
11. "Move Over" (Janis Joplin) - 3:46
12. "Who Do You Love" (Ellas McDaniel) - 3:36
13. "Turn the Page" (Bob Seger) - 5:35

== Personnel ==
- George Kooymans - guitar, vocals
- Rinus Gerritsen - bass guitar
- Barry Hay - guitar, vocals
- Cesar Zuiderwijk - drums

== Charts ==
=== Weekly charts ===
Chart (1995–96)	Peak position
Dutch Albums (Album Top 100)	17

=== Year-end charts ===
Chart (1996)	Position
Dutch Albums (Album Top 100)	89
