= Naked II =

Live album by Golden Earring
- Released: 9 November 1997
- Recorded: 1997
- Genre: Hard rock
- Length: 56:24
- Label: CNR
- Producer: John Sonneveld

Golden Earring chronology
Love Sweat (1995)	Naked II (1997)	Paradise in Distress (1999)

Professional ratings
Review scores
Source	Rating
Allmusic	link

Naked II is the second live acoustic album and fifth live overall album by Dutch hard rock band Golden Earring, released in 1997 (see 1997 in music). The album was not issued in the U.S.

== Track listing ==
All songs written by Hay and Kooymans except where noted.

1. "Who Do You Love?" (Ellas McDaniel) – 3:22
2. "Buddy Joe" (Kooymans) – 2:21
3. "She Flies on Strange Wings" (Kooymans) – 6:11
4. "Quiet Eyes" – 3:53
5. "Going to the Run" – 3:54
6. "Bombay" – 3:41
7. "Burning Stuntman" – 4:09[Studio Recording]
8. "Mood Indigo" – 4:13[Studio Recording]
9. "Where Will I Be" (Kooymans) – 4:06
10. "This Wheel's on Fire" (Rick Danko, Bob Dylan) – 3:15
11. "Johnny Make Believe" – 4:40
12. "When the Lady Smiles" – 5:21
13. "The Devil Made Me Do It" – 7:18

== Personnel ==
- Rinus Gerritsen – bass
- Barry Hay – guitar, vocals
- George Kooymans – guitar, vocals
- Cesar Zuiderwijk – drums

Additional personnel

- John Sonneveld – producer, engineer
- Cicero Vonnegun – keyboard

== Charts ==
=== Weekly charts ===
Chart (1997–1998)	Peak position
Dutch Albums (Album Top 100)	2

=== Year-end charts ===
Chart (1997)	Position
Dutch Albums (Album Top 100)	49

Chart (1998)	Position
Dutch Albums (Album Top 100)	77

== Certifications ==
Region	Certification	Certified units/sales
Netherlands (NVPI)	Platinum	100,000^{^}
^{^} Shipments figures based on certification alone.
