= Gates of Gold =

Studio album by Los Lobos
- Released: September 25, 2015
- Studios: Blue Velvet Studio, Santa Ana, California; Blue Cat Studios, San Antonio, Texas; Playground Recording Studios, Nashville, Tennessee; Milagro Studios, Walnut, California; Native Sound Recording, St. Louis, Missouri; Revolution Recording, Toronto, Ontario, Canada
- Genres: Chicano rock, roots rock, Americana, Tex-Mex, Latin rock
- Length: 42:44
- Labels: 429 Records, Proper Records (Europe)
- Producer: Los Lobos

Los Lobos chronology
Disconnected in New York City (2013)	Gates of Gold (2015)	Llegó Navidad (2019)

Professional ratings
Review scores
Source	Rating
The Absolute Sound	3.5/5 stars
AllMusic	4/5 stars
American Songwriter	3/5 stars
CL Tampa Bay	4/5 stars
Elmore Magazine	91/100
Glide Magazine	9/10
Record Collector	4/5 stars

Gates of Gold is the fifteenth studio album by the American rock band Los Lobos, released in September 2015. It was released worldwide through 429 Records and in Europe through Proper Records. It is the band's first full-length studio album since 2010's Tin Can Trust.

== Track listing ==
All tracks are written by David Hidalgo and Louie Pérez, except where noted.

No.	Title	Writer(s)	Length
1.	"Made to Break Your Heart"		4:44
2.	"When We Were Free"		5:09
3.	"Mis-Treater Boogie Blues"	Cesar Rosas	3:09
4.	"There I Go"		3:15
5.	"Too Small Heart"		3:51
6.	"Poquito Para Aqui"	Rosas	3:54
7.	"Gates of Gold"		3:50
8.	"La Tumba Sera el Final"	Francisco Vidal	2:38
9.	"Song of the Sun"		3:40
10.	"I Believed You So"	Rosas	4:23
11.	"Magdalena"		4:11

== Personnel ==
Credits adapted from the album's liner notes.

Los Lobos

- David Hidalgo – vocals, guitar, drums, bass, keyboards
- Cesar Rosas – vocals, guitar, bajo sexto
- Louie Pérez – guitar, jarana
- Conrad Lozano – bass
- Steve Berlin – saxophones, keyboards

Additional musicians

- David Hidalgo Jr. – drums
- Syd Straw – backing vocals (1)
- Marcos J. Reyes – percussion (1, 2, 4, 6, 8)
- Mitchell Froom – keyboards (2, 7)
- Oscar Utterstrom – trombone (2)
- Sammy Avila – organ (3, 6, 10), piano (10)
- Robert Crowell – alto saxophone (5)
- Josh Baca – accordion (6)
- Juan Perez – bass (6, 10)

Technical

- Los Lobos – producer
- Shane Smith – engineer, mixing (except 1)
- Darren Frandsen – assistant engineer
- Matt Jacobson – assistant engineer
- Jesse Druehl – assistant engineer
- Joe Trevino – additional engineer
- Adam Landry – additional engineer
- Cesar Rosas – additional engineer, photography
- Dave Beeman – additional engineer
- Stephen Koszler – additional engineer
- Niko Bolas – mixing (1)
- Dave McNair – mastering (except 3, 6, 8, 10)
- Stephen Marsh – mastering (3, 6, 8, 10)
- Mando Tavares – production coordination
- Al Quattrocchi – art direction
- Jeff Smith – art direction
- Tornado Design – art direction
- Louie Pérez – photography
- John Gilhooley – photography
- Noé Montes – photography

== Charts ==
Chart (2015)	Peak position
Belgian Albums (Ultratop Flanders)	99
Dutch Albums (Album Top 100)	57
UK Independent Albums (Official Charts)	45
US Billboard 200	153
US Top Album Sales (Billboard)	71
US Top Rock Albums (Billboard)	26
