= Llegó Navidad =

Studio album by Los Lobos
- Released: October 4, 2019
- Recorded: July 2019
- Studio: Nest Recorders, Los Angeles, California, United States
- Genre: Chicano rock
- Length: 40:23
- Language: English, Spanish
- Label: Rhino Records
- Producer: Los Lobos

Los Lobos chronology
Gates of Gold (2015)	Llegó Navidad (2019)	Native Sons (2021)

Llegó Navidad is a 2019 Christmas album from American Chicano rock band Los Lobos. The album is a diverse collection of songs that has received commercial and critical success.

== Recording and release ==
Rhino Records approached the band with the prospect of recording a studio album, which was an idea they had debated before, without recording one. Los Lobos reached out to song collectors and friends to gather a body of music that included 147 Latin Christmas songs (including one original tune), spanning several decades and the entirety of the Americas, across genres or styles as diverse as cumbia, cancion, ranchera, salsa, son jarocho, and Tex-Mex styles. The band promoted the album with live performances of Christmas songs interspersed with their regular material while on tour.

== Reception ==
=== Critical reception ===
The editorial staff of AllMusic Guide scored this album 4.5 out of five stars, with reviewer Mark Deming calling this a "fresh and interesting" take on standard Christmas albums that includes diverse styles and genres that displays the "passion, skill, and joy" that the band has fostered for decades. In The Arts Desk, Russ Coffey rated Llegó Navidad three out of five stars, noting that the band mixes not only genres but also moods that range from serious to silly. Writing for the Associated Press, John Rogers calls this album "a holiday recording pretty much like no other". Ludovic Hunter-Tilney of Financial Times scored this album four out of five stars, noting that the diverse Latin music is a "welcome twist" on the Christmas album theme.

A Rolling Stone overview of 2019 Christmas albums by Connor Ratliff highly recommends Llegó Navidad, in part due to introducing the author to new music. In 2022, Stephanie Kaloi wrote a listing of the 25 best Christmas albums of all time for Entertainment Weekly and included this one, writing that although it is not as familiar as some of the other music on her list, "within a few spins, each track became just as familiar as the holiday hits we've loved for years".

=== Sales chart performance ===
Llegó Navidad was the first top 10 album by Los Lobos on the Billboard charts in 19 years, debuting at eight on the Latin Pop Albums chart.

== Track listing ==
1. "La Rama" (traditional, arranged by Los Lobos) – 3:33
2. "Reluciente Sol" (traditional, arranged by Los Lobos) – 2:46
3. "It's Christmas Time in Texas" (Freddy Fender) – 2:51
4. "Amarga Navidad" (José Alfredo Jiménez) – 2:54
5. "Arbolito de Navidad" (José Barros) – 4:01
6. "¿Dónde Está Santa Claus?" (Al Greiner, Rod Parker, and George Scheck) – 4:05
7. "Llegó Navidad" (Javier Vázquez) – 4:00
8. "Las Mañanitas" (traditional, arranged by Los Lobos) – 2:31
9. "La Murga" (Willie Colón and Héctor "Lavoe" Pérez) – 4:06
10. "Christmas and You" (David Hidalgo and Louie Pérez) – 3:35
11. "Regalo de Reyes" (David Lama) – 3:09
12. "Feliz Navidad" (José Feliciano) – 2:58

== Personnel ==
Los Lobos

- Steve Berlin – saxophones, keyboards, Omnichord, production
- David Hidalgo – vocals, guitar, requinto guitar, drums, keyboards, production
- Conrad Lozano – vocals, guitarrón, double bass, production
- Louie Pérez – vocals, guitar, jarana, drums, production
- Cesar Rosas – vocals, guitar, bajo sexto, vihuela, production

Additional musicians

- Josh Baca – accordion
- Jason Lozano – drums
- Alfredo "El Nino" Ortiz – congas, bongos, percussion
- Marcos J. Reyes – congas, timbales, percussion
- Chris Sorem – Omnichord, recording, mixing

Technical personnel

- Gustavo Arellano – curation and research
- Piero F. Giunti – photography
- Grant Hier – liner notes
- Jeremy Leung – recording and mixing assistance
- Jon Luini – video
- Ruairi O'Flaherty – mastering at Echo Studio, Los Angeles, California, United States
- Al Quattrocchi – art direction
- Louie Pérez – art direction
- ZZ Satriani – video
- Jeff Smith – art direction
- Tornado Creative – design
- Pablo Yglesias – curation and research

== Charts ==
Chart performance for Llegó Navidad
Chart (2019)	Peak
US Latin Pop Albums (Billboard)	1
US Top Latin Albums (Billboard)	10

== See also ==
- 2019 in American music
- 2019 in rock music
- List of 2019 albums
