= Native Sons (Los Lobos album) =

Studio album by Los Lobos
- Released: 2021
- Label: New West
- Producer: Steve Berlin

Los Lobos chronology
Llegó Navidad (2019)	Native Sons (2021)

Native Sons is an album by the American band Los Lobos, released in 2021. The album is a collection of cover songs dedicated to music from the band's hometown of Los Angeles, California, except for one new original song.

The album peaked at No. 7 on Billboard's Americana/Folk Albums chart. It won a 2022 Grammy Award in the Best Americana Album category.

== Production ==
The album was produced by bandmember Steve Berlin. It was recorded during the band's longest break from touring in 20 years. The title track is the only original composition. "Love Special Delivery" was originally by Thee Midniters, and was one of the first hit rock songs by a Chicano band. "The World Is a Ghetto", by War, was the band's favorite cover to record.

== Critical reception ==
Professional ratings
Review scores
Source	Rating
AllMusic	4/5 stars
Philadelphia Daily News	3/4 stars
Pitchfork	7.2/10
Winnipeg Free Press	3.5/5 stars

AllMusic deemed the album "essential listening from one of America's greatest bands," writing that Los Lobos make the songs their own "with the imagination, spirit, and commitment of their performances, not to mention their impressive chops and the incredible feel that comes from more than four decades of working together." The Star Tribune concluded that it "is a testament to how Los Lobos themselves are as richly varied as the city and borderland territory that birthed them." The Mercury News praised the cover of "Sail On, Sailor".

== Track listing ==
No.	Title	Writer(s)	Original artist	Length
1.	"Love Special Delivery"	Jimmy Espinoza / William Garcia	Thee Midniters (1966)	2:22
2.	"Misery"	Barrett Strong	Barrett Strong (1961)	2:32
3.	"Bluebird"	Stephen Stills	Buffalo Springfield (1967)	3:07
4.	"For What It's Worth"	Stephen Stills	Buffalo Springfield (1966)	3:29
5.	"Los Chucos Suaves"	Lalo Guerrero	Lalo Guerrero (1940s)	3:26
6.	"Jamaica Say You Will"	Jackson Browne	Jackson Browne (1972)	3:16
7.	"Never No More"	Percy Mayfield / Don Malone	Percy Mayfield (1962)	2:36
8.	"Native Son"	David Hidalgo / Louie Pérez	Los Lobos	3:10
9.	"Farmer John"	Don Harris / Dewey Terry	Don and Dewey (1959)	2:29
10.	"Dichoso"	Nick Jimenez	Willie Bobo (1966)	3:36
11.	"Sail On, Sailor"	Brian Wilson; Tandyn Almer; Van Dyke Parks; Ray Kennedy; Jack Rieley	The Beach Boys (1972)	3:20
12.	"The World Is a Ghetto"	War: Papa Dee Allen; Harold Brown; B.B. Dickerson; Lonnie Jordan; Charles Miller; Lee Oskar; Howard Scott	War (1972)	8:33
13.	"Flat Top Joint"	Dave Alvin	The Blasters (1980)	2:51
14.	"Where Lovers Go"	Mario Paniagua	The Jaguars (1965)	4:32

== Charts ==
Chart (2021)	Peak position
Belgian Albums (Ultratop Flanders)	41
Dutch Albums (Album Top 100)	76
Scottish Albums (Official Charts)	65
Swiss Albums (Schweizer Hitparade)	32
UK Independent Albums (Official Charts)	29
US Independent Albums (Billboard)	30
US Americana/Folk Albums (Billboard)	7
US Top Album Sales (Billboard)	12
US Top Rock Albums (Billboard)	46
