= California Saga/California =

Single by the Beach Boys

from the album Holland
- B-side: "Funky Pretty"
- Released: May 1973
- Recorded: 1972
- Genre: Rock
- Length: 3:21
- Label: Brother
- Songwriter: Al Jardine

The Beach Boys singles chronology
"Sail On, Sailor" (1973)	"California Saga/California" (1973)	"Child of Winter (Christmas Song)" (1974)

"California Saga/California" is a song by American rock band the Beach Boys from their January 1973 album Holland. It was written by Al Jardine and is the first song written solely by him to appear on any of the group's albums. It is the third and final part of the "California Saga" series of songs on Holland. In May 1973, a remixed version was issued as a single under the title "California Saga (On My Way to Sunny Californ-i-a)".

== Recording ==
"California" features Brian Wilson – who was otherwise barely present at the Holland sessions – singing the opening line "On my way to sunny Californ-i-a". Jardine remembered, "We came down to the studio to do a mix-down so [Brian] could get home. Then suddenly, [he] came in and said, 'Give me a microphone.' He walked straight in. I hadn't seen him for a month. He walked up to the microphone and started singing, 'I'm on my way to sunny Californ-i-a.' He then left the microphone and walked out." Wilson corroborated this story, also calling the track "a song to lift your spirits up."

Former Beach Boy Bruce Johnston, who had officially left the band several months earlier, explained in a 2013 interview, "I had to secretly come down and do vocals. Al told me, 'I've got this track 'California Saga' and I want you to sing on it.' That's a cool track and I sang background on that uncredited."

== Single release ==
In the UK, "California Saga/California" (backed with "Sail On, Sailor") was issued in February 1973 as the lead single from Holland, reaching number 37. Biographer Mark Dillon surmised that Jardine's song was chosen as a single because his 1970 production of "Cotton Fields" had been the band's last hit there.

In March 1973, the band remixed and overdubbed new vocals onto "California Saga/California" for a U.S. single release. Released in May, the single (backed with "Funky Pretty") reached number 84. Record World said that it "has all the sound of many of their hits, complete with those legendary harmonies." On the New Zealand Listener charts it reached number 15.

== Personnel ==
Credits from Craig Slowinski, John Brode, Will Crerar and Joshilyn Hoisington.

The Beach Boys

- Blondie Chaplin – electric guitar (with wah-wah pedal)
- Ricky Fataar – drums, pedal steel guitar
- Al Jardine – backing vocals, banjos, electric 12-string guitar, producer
- Mike Love – lead and backing vocals
- Brian Wilson – intro vocal
- Carl Wilson – backing vocals, Hammond B-3 organ, Moog synthesizer (bass)

Additional musicians

- Bruce Johnston – backing vocals
- Charles Lloyd – flute
- Frank Mayes – baritone saxophone, horn arrangement
- Unknown musicians – tenor saxophone, 2 trumpets, diatonic harmonica

== Al Jardine version ==
Jardine re-recorded the song for his 2010 solo album, A Postcard from California. The song features Neil Young, David Crosby and Stephen Stills.
