= Al Jardine =

American musician (born 1942)

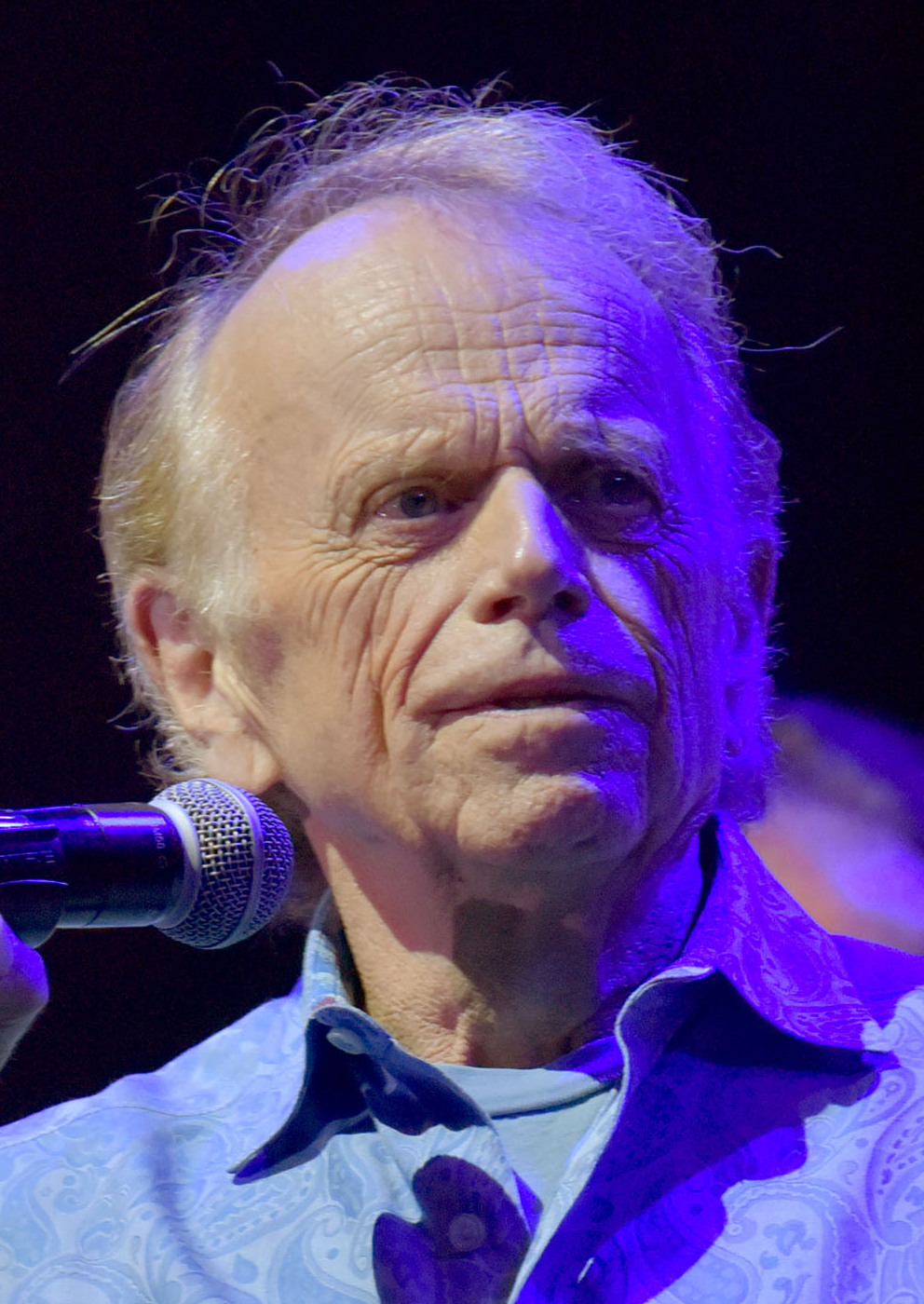
- Jardine performing in 2019

Background information
- Born: Alan Charles Jardine; September 3, 1942 (age 84); Lima, Ohio, U.S.
- Origin: Hawthorne, California, U.S.
- Genres: Rock; pop; folk
- Occupations: Musician; singer; songwriter
- Instruments: Vocals; guitar; bass
- Years active: 1961–present
- Member of: Pet Sounds Band
- Formerly of: The Beach Boys
- Website: aljardine.com

Alan Charles Jardine (born September 3, 1942) is an American musician, singer, and songwriter who co-founded the Beach Boys. He is best known as the band's rhythm guitarist, harmony vocalist, and occasional lead singer on singles such as "Help Me, Rhonda" (1965) and "Then I Kissed Her" (1965).

Jardine originally performed in a folk group while a student at Hawthorne High School, where he befriended Brian Wilson. After both enrolled at El Camino College, Jardine invited Wilson to record at a professional studio and together formed the Beach Boys with Brian's brothers Carl and Dennis and their cousin Mike Love. Jardine left the group in early 1962 and returned in late 1963. From the late 1960s to 1970s, he contributed as a co-writer or co-producer on singles such as the originals "California Saga/California" (1973) and "Lady Lynda" (1979, a UK top-10 hit), and cover versions of "Cottonfields" (1970) and "Come Go with Me" (1979).

Jardine was inducted into the Rock and Roll Hall of Fame as a member of the Beach Boys in 1988. Following Carl's death in 1998, he stopped touring with the band and has since performed as a solo artist. He has released one solo studio album, A Postcard from California (2010), and EP, Islands in the Sun (2025). In 2011, he briefly rejoined the band for their 50th anniversary tour and subsequently toured alongside Brian until 2022. Since 2025, Jardine has performed with the Pet Sounds Band, consisting of musicians from Wilson's backing band.

== Early life ==
Alan Charles Jardine was born at Lima Memorial Hospital in Lima, Ohio, the younger of two children to Virginia and Donald Jardine. After spending his first years of childhood in Lima, he moved with his family to Rochester, New York, where his father worked for Eastman Kodak and taught at the Rochester Institute of Technology. His family later moved to San Francisco and then to Hawthorne, California, where he and his older brother Neal spent the remainder of their youth.

At Hawthorne High School, he was a fullback on the football team, soon befriending backup quarterback Brian Wilson. Jardine also watched Brian and brother Carl Wilson singing at a school assembly. After attending Ferris State University during the 1960–61 academic year, Jardine registered as a student at El Camino College in 1961. There, he was reunited with Brian and first presented the idea of forming a band as the two worked through harmony ideas together in the college's music room. Jardine's primary musical interest was folk and he learned banjo and guitar specifically to play folk music. When the Beach Boys formed at Wilson's home, he first tried to push the band toward folk but was overruled in favor of rock and roll.

A versatile string instrumentalist, Jardine played stand-up bass on the Beach Boys' first recording, the song "Surfin'" (1961). He fully rejoined the Beach Boys in the summer of 1963 at Brian Wilson's request and worked alongside guitarist David Marks with the band until October 1963, when Marks quit the Beach Boys after a disagreement with the band's manager, Murry Wilson.

== Career ==
=== 1960s–1980s ===
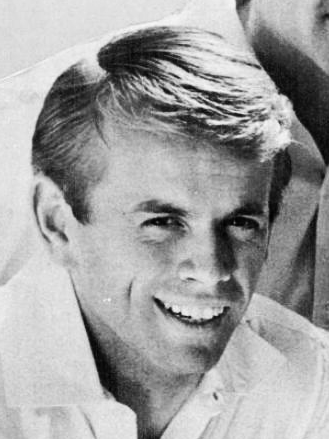
Jardine in 1965

Jardine played double bass on the Beach Boys' first (and only) record for Candix Records, "Surfin'", but quit the band a few months later, in February 1962. A common misconception from this time states that Jardine left to focus on dental school, but he did not apply to dental school until 1964; he left due to creative differences and his belief that the newly-formed group would not be a commercial success. Jardine was replaced by David Marks on rhythm guitar. Jardine returned in spring 1963 as bassist so Brian could make fewer touring appearances. Issues between Marks, his parents, and manager/the Wilsons' father Murry led Marks to quit in October 1963. Jardine became the Beach Boys' rhythm guitarist following Marks' departure.

Jardine first sang lead on "Christmas Day", on 1964's The Beach Boys' Christmas Album and followed with the Number 1 hit "Help Me, Rhonda". It was at Jardine's suggestion that the Beach Boys recorded a version of the folk standard "Sloop John B", which Brian Wilson arranged and produced for their Pet Sounds album in 1966.

After Brian Wilson discontinued touring in late 1964, Jardine took on a more prominent role as a lead vocalist during live performances with the group. Beginning with his contributions to the Friends album, Jardine also became a songwriter and wrote or co-wrote a number of songs for the Beach Boys. "California Saga: California" from the Holland album, charted in early 1973. Jardine's song for his first wife, "Lady Lynda" (1978), scored a Top Ten chart entry in the UK. Increasingly from the time of the Surf's Up album, Jardine became involved alongside Carl Wilson in production duties for the Beach Boys. He shared production credits with Ron Altbach on M.I.U. Album (1978) and was a significant architect (with Mike Love) of the album's concept and content. As with "Lady Lynda" and his 1969 rewrite of Lead Belly's "Cotton Fields," "Come Go with Me" and "Peggy Sue" on M.I.U. Album were Jardine productions, the first being a measurable hit in the UK.

Jardine instigated the Beach Boys' recording of a remake of the Mamas and the Papas' song "California Dreamin'" (featuring Roger McGuinn), reaching No. 8 on the Billboard adult contemporary chart in 1986. The associated music video featured in heavy rotation on MTV and secured extensive international airplay. The video featured all the surviving Beach Boys and two of the three surviving members of the Mamas and the Papas, John Phillips and Michelle Phillips (Denny Doherty was on the East coast and declined), along with former Byrds guitarist Roger McGuinn.

Jardine was inducted into the Rock and Roll Hall of Fame as a member of the Beach Boys in 1988.

=== 1990s–2000s ===
In 1991, Jardine had allegedly been "suspended" by Love from the band prior to the recording of the album Summer in Paradise, supposedly because of a dispute about content; however, he returned during the sessions to sing lead vocals on two of the album's songs and contributed to the partial re-recording of tracks for the UK release of the album.

Early in 1997, Carl Wilson was diagnosed with lung and brain cancer after years of heavy smoking. Despite his terminal condition, Carl continued to perform with the band on its 1997 summer tour (a double-bill with the band Chicago) while undergoing chemotherapy. During performances, he sat on a stool and needed oxygen after every song. David Marks rejoined the group in Carl's absence, touring with Love, Jardine, and Johnston. Carl died on February 6, 1998, at the age of 51, two months after the death of the Wilsons' mother, Audree.

After Carl's death in 1998, Jardine left the Beach Boys, leaving Love as the only original member in the group playing live concerts; Love retained David Marks (until Marks himself left in 1999) and Bruce Johnston in his group. Jardine continued to tour and recorded with his band, "Beach Boys Family and Friends", with a rotating lineup that utilized many former longtime Beach Boys touring members, including Billy Hinsche (originally from Dino, Desi and Billy before working with The Beach Boys), Ed Carter, Bobby Figueroa, and Daryl Dragon (better known as “The Captain” from Captain and Tennille after leaving The Beach Boys), alongside Jardine's sons Matt (who himself had worked as an assistant stage manager for The Beach Boys from 1986 until 1988 and then as a member of the backing band, contributing percussion and vocals, from 1988 until 1998) and Adam, Brian Wilson's daughters Carnie and Wendy (who had worked as a trio in Wilson Phillips and as a duo as The Wilsons), and Owen Elliot (the daughter of Cass Elliot of The Mamas and the Papas). (Jardine and his band were also promoted or billed under the banners "Al Jardine, Beach Boy" and "Al Jardine of the Beach Boys" during this time.)

Jardine began to perform regularly with his band, "Beach Boys Family and Friends", until he ran into legal issues for using the name without a license from the band's corporate holdings company (and occasional record label), BRI (Brother Records). (Love had already received a license from BRI after Carl's death.) BRI and Love initiated legal action against Jardine after a 1999 show where promoters had incorrectly billed Jardine's band as "The Beach Boys". Meanwhile, Jardine sued Love, claiming that he had been excluded from their concerts, and BRI, through its longtime attorney, Ed McPherson, sued Jardine in Federal Court. Jardine, in turn, counter-claimed against BRI for wrongful termination. The courts later ruled in favor of BRI and Love, in the dispute over the Beach Boys' name and that of Jardine's band, "Beach Boys' Family and Friends", denying Jardine the use of the Beach Boys name in any fashion. Jardine proceeded to appeal this decision in addition to seeking $4 million in damages. The California Court of Appeal ruled that Love acted wrongfully in freezing Jardine out of touring under the Beach Boys name, allowing Jardine to continue with his lawsuit. The case ended up being settled outside of court with the terms not disclosed.

In 2002, Jardine and his band released their first solo live album, Live in Las Vegas (see discography section below for track listing). The number of the band's live appearances dwindled after the lawsuit, partially since Jardine had little name recognition compared to the Beach Boys touring band led by Mike Love or to Brian Wilson's solo performances. In late 2006, Jardine joined Wilson and his band for a short tour celebrating the 40th anniversary of Pet Sounds.

In 2009, Jardine's lead vocal on "Big Sur Christmas" was released on MP3 download, produced by longtime Red Barn Studios engineer Stevie Heger under Heger's band's name, Hey Stevie. The track also was released on the Hey Stevie album, Eloquence.

=== 2010s ===
==== 2010–2015 ====
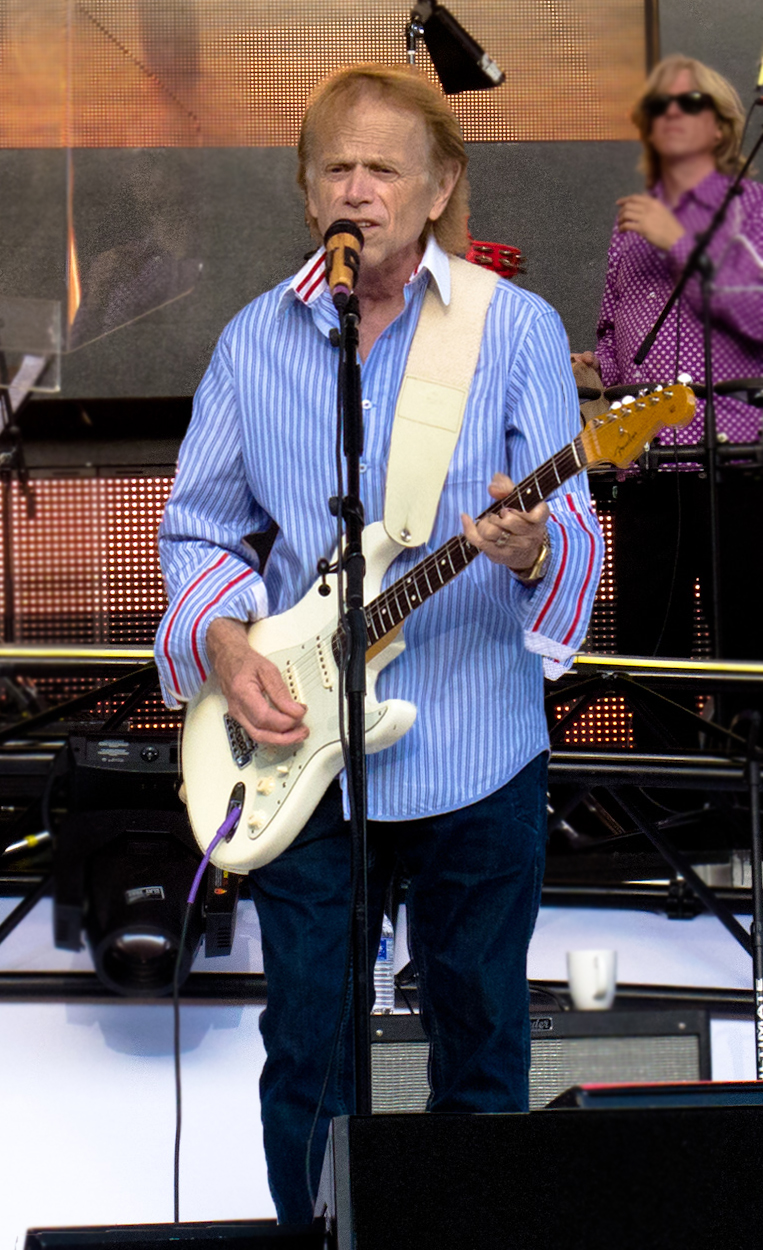
Jardine performing with the Beach Boys during their 2012 reunion tour

Jardine released A Postcard from California, his solo debut, in June 2010 (re-released with two extra tracks on April 3, 2012). The album features contributions from Beach Boys Brian Wilson, Carl Wilson (posthumously), Bruce Johnston, David Marks, and Mike Love. There are also guest appearances from Glen Campbell (who had frequently worked with The Beach Boys as a touring musician and session guitarist in the mid-1960s), David Crosby, Neil Young, Stephen Stills, Steve Miller, Scott Mathews, Gerry Beckley and Dewey Bunnell (members of America) and Flea. A spoken intermission written by Stephen Kalinich, called "Tidepool Interlude", features actor Alec Baldwin. Also in 2010, Brian Wilson and Jardine sang on "We Are the World 25: for Haiti", a new recording of "We Are the World" (with partially revised lyrics), which was released as a charity single to benefit the population of Haiti. Jardine made his first appearance with the Beach Boys touring band in more than 10 years in 2011 at a tribute concert for Ronald Reagan's 100th birthday; at this concert, he sang lead on "Help Me, Rhonda" and "Sloop John B". He made a handful of other appearances with Love and Johnston's touring band in preparation for a reunion.

In December 2011, it was announced that Brian Wilson, Mike Love, Al Jardine, David Marks, and Bruce Johnston would reunite for a new Beach Boys album and The Beach Boys 50th Anniversary Reunion Tour in 2012. On February 12, 2012, the Beach Boys performed at the 2012 Grammy Awards, in what was billed as a "special performance" by organizers. It marked the group's first live performance to include Wilson since 1996, Jardine since 1998, and Marks since 1999. Released on June 5, That's Why God Made the Radio debuted at number 3 on the US charts, expanding the group's span of Billboard 200 top-ten albums across 49 years and one week, passing the Beatles with 47 years of top-ten albums. Critics generally regarded the album as an "uneven" collection, with most of the praise centered on its closing musical suite. The album features the song "From There to Back Again,” on which Jardine shared lead vocals with Wilson. Critics have acclaimed Jardine's performance in the song, with Ryan Reed of Paste magazine praising his "stand-out lead vocal", while John Bush of Allmusic deemed the song the "most beautiful" in the album, having been "impeccably" framed by Wilson around Jardine's "aging but still sweet" voice. (Also in 2012, David Marks released the album The Circle Continues, which featured a guest appearance from Jardine on vocals on the song "I Sail Away".)

Ultimately, the reunion tour ended in September 2012 as planned, after a final show on September 28, but amid erroneous rumors that Love had dismissed Wilson from the Beach Boys. At this time, Love and Johnston had announced via a press release that following the end of the reunion tour the Beach Boys would revert to the pre-reunion tour Love/Johnston lineup, without Brian, Jardine, or Marks, all of whom expressed surprise. Wilson, Jardine, and Marks had been opposed to this decision, which was made by Love, but were unable to act on it because Love still had his pre-reunion license to use the band's name, and all booked reunion dates had been fulfilled, allowing Love to boycott an extension of a reunion. Wilson had hoped to record another studio album as part of a continued reunion, and Jardine reportedly asked Love to reconsider his decision. However, Love was committed to touring only with Johnston and their touring band, though he was (at least briefly) open to the idea of recording another studio album.

Although such dates were noted in a late June issue of Rolling Stone, it was widely reported that the three had been "fired". Love later wrote that the end of the reunion came partly as a result of "interference" from Brian's wife and manager Melinda Ledbetter-Wilson and that he (Love) "had wanted to send out a joint press release, between Brian and me, formally announcing the end of the reunion tour on September 28. But I couldn't get Brian's management team on board..." On October 5, Love responded in a self-written press release to the Los Angeles Times stating he "did not fire Brian Wilson from the Beach Boys. I cannot fire Brian Wilson from the Beach Boys ... I do not have such authority. And even if I did, I would never fire Brian Wilson from the Beach Boys." He claimed that nobody in the band "wanted to do a 50th anniversary tour that lasted 10 years" and that its limited run "was long agreed upon". On October 9, Wilson and Jardine submitted a written response to the rumors stating: "I was completely blindsided by his press release ... We hadn't even discussed as a band what we were going to do with all the offers that were coming in for more 50th shows."

From late September, Love and Johnston continued to perform under the Beach Boys name, while Wilson, Jardine, and Marks toured as a trio in 2013, and a subsequent tour with guitarist Jeff Beck also included Blondie Chaplin at select dates. Wilson and Jardine continued to tour together in 2014 and following years, often joined by Chaplin; Marks declined to join them after 2013. Jardine has appeared at almost every single Brian Wilson concert or other performance since the end of the Beach Boys’ 50th Anniversary reunion tour in 2012, with very few exceptions. (Note: Exceptions, in which Brian Wilson performed without Jardine, include January 10, 2013; February 24, 2013; January 22, 2014; October 23, 2014; and May 16, 2015.) During this time, Jardine also continued to make sporadic solo appearances with his band. In June 2013, Wilson's website announced that he was recording and self-producing new material with Jardine, Marks, Chaplin, Don Was, and Jeff Beck. It stated that the material might be split into three albums: one of new pop songs, another of mostly instrumental tracks with Beck, and another of interwoven tracks dubbed "the suite" which initially began form as the closing four tracks of That's Why God Made the Radio. In January 2014, Wilson declared in an interview that the Beck collaborations would not be released.

==== 2015–2019 ====
Released in April 2015, No Pier Pressure marked another collaboration between Wilson and Joe Thomas, featuring guest appearances from Jardine, Marks, Chaplin, and others. In 2016, Wilson and Jardine embarked on the Pet Sounds 50th Anniversary World Tour, promoted as Wilson's final performances of the album, with Chaplin appearing as a special guest at all dates on select songs. Jardine has since contributed to all of Wilson's tours since then. In July 2016, Jardine appeared in an episode of the Adult Swim series Decker, playing the role of the President's "science advisor". Jardine and his son Matt contributed backing vocals to John Mayer's "Emoji of a Wave", which was released in 2017.

In 2018, Jardine began performing solo storyteller concerts called "Al Jardine – A Postcard From California - From the Very First Song With a Founding Member of the Beach Boys" which featured his son Matt and long time Peter Asher associate Jeff Alan Ross. Jardine continued to tour these shows into 2020, while still performing with the Brian Wilson band.

In July 2018, Wilson, Jardine, Love, Johnston, and Marks reunited for a one-off Q&A session moderated by director Rob Reiner at the Capitol Records Tower in Los Angeles. It was the first time the band had appeared together in public since their 2012 tour.

In April 2019, Jardine was inducted into the Rochester Music Hall of Fame. Also in 2019, Jardine and Marks performed at a benefit concert for charity (called "California Saga 2") to raise money for the homeless. That same year, Wilson and Jardine (with Chaplin) embarked on a co-headlining tour with the Zombies, performing selections from Friends and Surf's Up.

=== 2020s ===
==== 2020–2024 ====
In February 2020, Wilson's and Jardine's official social media pages encouraged fans to boycott the band's music out of concern for animal rights after it was announced that Love's Beach Boys would perform at the Safari Club International Convention in Reno, Nevada. The concert proceeded despite online protests, as Love issued a statement that said his group has always supported "freedom of thought and expression as a fundamental tenet of our rights as Americans." In October, Love and Johnston's Beach Boys performed at a fundraiser for Donald Trump's presidential re-election campaign; Wilson and Jardine again issued a statement that they had not been informed about this performance and did not support it.

In March 2020, Jardine was asked about a possible reunion and responded that the band would reunite for a string of live performances in 2021, although he believed a new album was unlikely. In response to reunion rumors, Love said in May that he was open to a 60th anniversary tour, although Wilson has "some serious health issues", while Wilson's manager Jean Sievers commented that no one had spoken to Wilson about such a tour. In February 2021, it was announced that Brian Wilson, Love, Jardine, and the estate of Carl Wilson had sold a majority stake in the band's intellectual property to Irving Azoff and his new company Iconic Artists Group; rumors of a 60th anniversary reunion were again discussed.

On February 12, 2021, Jardine released a CD single featuring a new rendition of his bonus track from "A Postcard from California" titled "Waves of Love 2.0" (as the A-side) and a new song "Jenny Clover" (as the B-side). It was co-written and produced by his long time collaborating partner Larry Dvoskin. A portion of the proceeds were earmarked to raise money for "The World Central Kitchen" charity org. In April 2021, Omnivore Recordings released California Music Presents Add Some Music, an album featuring Love, Jardine, Marks, Johnston, and several children of the original Beach Boys (most notably on a re-recording of The Beach Boys' "Add Some Music to Your Day" from 1970's Sunflower). Also in 2021, a live version of Wilson and Jardine performing "In My Room" at the Ryman Auditorium in Nashville, Tennessee (recorded at an unknown time between 2013 and 2021) was released on the soundtrack album to the Wilson documentary Long Promised Road.

In 2022, the group was expected to participate in a "60th anniversary celebration". Azoff stated in an interview from May 2021, "We're going to announce a major deal with a streamer for the definitive documentary on The Beach Boys and a 60th anniversary celebration. We're planning a tribute concert affiliated with the Rock & Roll Hall of Fame and SiriusXM, with amazing acts. That's adding value, and that's why I invested in The Beach Boys." On Mike Love's 81st birthday, Jardine once again hinted at a possible reunion on his Facebook page by stating that he was "looking forward" to seeing Love at the "reunion"; however, no reunion occurred. Also in 2022, Jardine announced the "Al Jardine Family & Friends Tour" featuring Carnie and Wendy Wilson of Wilson Phillips. The group also included Jardine's son, Matt Jardine; the eight-member band for the tour was to be led by Carnie's husband, Rob Bonfiglio, who is Wilson Phillips’ musical director and performs regularly in Brian Wilson's band. The band was also to include longtime Beach Boys associates Ed Carter, Bobby Figueroa, and Probyn Gregory. That same year, Jardine made a guest appearance on the song "Best Summer Ever" by the group Drifting Sand, and he and Blondie Chaplin also participated in what turned out to be Wilson's final tour, a co-headlining tour with the band Chicago. Since 2022, Jardine has been touring in two configurations: "Family & Friends" and the "Endless Summer Beach Band" (the latter featuring a lineup of all of musicians in the "Family & Friends" configuration, minus Carnie and Wendy Wilson).

In January 2023, the tribute concert mentioned by Azoff in 2021 was announced as being part of the "Grammys Salute" series of televised tribute concerts. On February 8, three days after the 2023 Grammy award ceremonies, A Grammy Salute to the Beach Boys was recorded at the Dolby Theatre in Hollywood and subsequently aired as a two-hour special on CBS on April 9. Present for the taping were Wilson, Jardine, Marks, Johnston, and Love—this time not as performers but as featured guests, seated in a luxury box at the theatre and overlooking tribute performances covering the gamut of their catalog by mostly contemporary artists. According to Billboard, the program had 5.18 million viewers.

==== 2024–present ====
In March 2024, the band announced the release of a self-titled documentary that would be released by streaming service Disney+; it would include archived interviews from various members of the band and their inner circle, including Brian Wilson, Love, Jardine, Marks, Johnston, Carl Wilson, Dennis Wilson, Chaplin, Fataar, Brian Wilson's ex-wife Marilyn, and Don Was, among others. The documentary was directed by Frank Marshall and Thom Zimny and was released on May 24, 2024. The documentary included some footage from a private reunion of Brian Wilson, Love, Jardine, Marks, and Johnston at Paradise Cove, where the Surfin' Safari album cover photo was taken in 1962. Brian Wilson, Love, Jardine, Marks, Johnston, and Blondie Chaplin also participated in a non-performing reunion at the documentary's premiere on May 24, 2024.

In August 2024, Jardine released the single "Wish", co-written and recorded with Dvoskin. In a September 2024 interview with Rolling Stone to promote "Wish", Jardine revealed that the song was written in the early 1990s, during a period in which Brian Wilson was not working regularly with the band; the song was therefore dedicated to, and inspired by, Brian Wilson and the late Dennis Wilson. Jardine will donate a portion of proceeds to the Make-A-Wish Foundation. Jardine also announced that "Wish" would hopefully appear on a second solo album, for which he is planning to finish some unreleased songs. Jardine released the four-song EP Islands In The Sun on May 30, 2025. Johnston, Neil Young and Flea made guest appearances on the EP.

In August 2024, Jardine revealed that, with Brian Wilson's permission for the use of his band and name, he was planning a tour with many of the musicians from the Brian Wilson Band, minus Wilson himself. He tentatively planned for the setlist to include a mixture of deep cuts from the band's 1970s albums, as well as their classic hits. On April 17, 2025, Jardine announced that he along with the Pet Sounds Band will hit the road for a brief tour with dates in July, August, and September 2025. Jardine had hoped that Wilson could potentially participate in Los Angeles-area concerts; following Wilson's death on June 11, 2025, he decided to continue with the Pet Sounds Band shows in honor of Wilson. On June 17, 2025, Jardine announced further dates with the Pet Sounds Band to take place in Australia in October and November 2025. On September 30, 2025, these tour dates were rescheduled to June 2026.

== Personal life ==
In 1964, Jardine married Lynda Sperry, and they have two sons, including Matthew. They divorced in 1982. Jardine married Mary Ann Helmandollar the following year, and they are the parents of two sons.

== Book ==
Jardine has authored one book, Sloop John B: A Pirate's Tale (2005), illustrated by Jimmy Pickering. The book is a children's story about a boy's Caribbean adventure with his grandfather, reworded from the original folk lyric of the song "Sloop John B". It also includes a free CD with singalong acoustic recording by Jardine.

== Discography ==
Albums and EPs

Year	Album details
2001	Live in Las Vegas: Released: 2001; Tracks: "Dance, Dance, Dance"; "Do You Wanna Dance"; "Catch a Wave"; "Hawaii; Do It Again"; "Darlin'"; "Wild Honey"; "Come Go with Me"; "Surfer Girl"; "Don't Worry, Baby"; "Shut Down"; "Little Deuce Coupe"; "I Get Around"; "In My Room"; "Girl Don't Tell Me"; "Break Away"; "Sail On Sailor"; "God Only Knows"; "Sloop John B"; "Wouldn't It Be Nice"; "Good Vibrations"; "Heroes & Villains"; "Help Me, Rhonda"; "Surfin' USA"; "Barbara Ann"; "Fun, Fun, Fun"; "California Energy Blues"
2010	A Postcard from California: Released digitally and on CD on demand: June 29, 2010; Limited edition Black Friday vinyl release: November 23, 2018; CD and digital download reissue: c. 2022
2025	Islands in the Sun (EP): EP released on May 30, 2025, and features guest appearances by Bruce Johnston, Neil Young, and Flea

Singles

Date of release	Title	Album	Label
December 2002	"PT Cruiser"/"PT Cruiser" (a cappella)/"PT Cruiser" (track)	N/A	CQ
November 17, 2009	"Christmas Day"	N/A	Jardine Tours
April 16, 2011	"Don't Fight the Sea" (featuring The Beach Boys) b/w "Friends" (a cappella) (non-album track)	A Postcard from California	Capitol
2015	"Hurry Up, Hurry Up, Santa Claus"	N/A	William V Roach
December 10, 2017	"Sunshine to Snowflakes"	N/A	Deborah Arman Lent
February 12, 2021	"Waves of Love 2.0" b/w "Jenny Clover" (non-album track)	A Postcard from California reissue	Do What You Love Media
August 22, 2024	"Wish"	TBD	Miracle Media

== Bibliography ==
- Carlin, Peter Ames (2006). Catch a Wave: The Rise, Fall, and Redemption of the Beach Boys' Brian Wilson. Rodale. ISBN 978-1-59486-320-2.
- Love, Mike (2016). Good Vibrations: My Life as a Beach Boy. Penguin Publishing Group. ISBN 978-0-698-40886-9.
- Matijas-Mecca, Christian (2017). The Words and Music of Brian Wilson. ABC-CLIO. ISBN 978-1-4408-3899-6. Archived from the original on June 19, 2020.
- Murphy, James B. (2015). Becoming the Beach Boys, 1961-1963. McFarland. ISBN 978-0-7864-7365-6.
