= Holland (album) =

1973 studio album by the Beach Boys

Studio album by the Beach Boys
- Released: January 8, 1973
- Recorded: June 3 – November 28, 1972
- Studios: BBC 2 (Baambrugge); Village Recorders (California)
- Genres: Soft rock; pop
- Length: 36:19
- Labels: Brother; Reprise
- Producer: The Beach Boys

The Beach Boys chronology
Carl and the Passions – "So Tough" (1972)	Holland (1973)	The Beach Boys in Concert (1973)

Singles from Holland
- 1. "Sail On, Sailor" / "Only with You" Released: February 1973; 2. "California Saga/California" / "Funky Pretty" Released: May 1973

Holland is the nineteenth studio album by American rock band the Beach Boys, released January 8, 1973, on Brother/Reprise. It is their first album recorded without Bruce Johnston since 1965, their second with Blondie Chaplin and Ricky Fataar, and their final studio album created under the de facto leadership of Carl Wilson and manager Jack Rieley. The LP was originally packaged with a bonus EP, Mount Vernon and Fairway, which consisted of a 12-minute fairy tale written and produced by Brian and Carl Wilson.

Per its title, Holland was recorded over the summer of 1972 at a barn in Baambrugge, near Amsterdam, where the band members and their entourage had decamped for several months in the pursuit of creative inspiration. Recording the album was an unprecedented and extremely costly venture, as the group had commissioned their engineers to renovate the barn, which had housed an existing studio, using components from the band's studio in Los Angeles that were dismantled, shipped to the Netherlands in crates, and then reassembled. Ultimately, only the album's basic tracks were recorded in the Netherlands, with the band finishing off the record in late 1972 at Village Recorders in Los Angeles. Total expenses were estimated at $250,000 (equivalent to $1.92 million in 2025).

Holland received generally favorable reviews. It peaked at number 36 in the US and number 20 in the UK, and it produced two singles: "Sail On, Sailor" and "California Saga/California". Subsequently, the band recorded little in the studio for the next two years. Instead, they released the live album The Beach Boys in Concert (1973), and did not follow up with another studio album until 15 Big Ones (1976). In 2022, an expanded version of Holland was packaged within the compilation Sail On Sailor – 1972.

== Background ==
In late December 1970, the Beach Boys played three concert dates in Rotterdam and Amsterdam as part of a short European tour. On the first date, which had been scheduled to begin at 12:30 a.m., the band arrived four hours late due to a missed flight, and were surprised to find that the concert hall venue, the De Doelen, Rotterdam, was still packed with attendees. Furthermore, the audience shouted for the group to perform their new songs, rather than their past hits. Carl Wilson told a local magazine, "I love this audience. Our last albums [20/20 and Sunflower] sold poorly in the US, our financial situation is disastrous – and here we have success. I like this country." (Note: The next day, Bruce Johnston told an interviewer, "The audience is very respected by me and the band. ... They listen to the lyrics. I might consider living here.")

Reports from this period suggested that the group were planning to move from Los Angeles to Britain once their recording commitments were finished. In one report, manager Jack Rieley said they were "definitely leaving Los Angeles because of the smog." Later, Rieley told Rolling Stone, "I wanted to [shift our base] and so did Carl. [Holland] seemed like an interesting place. But most importantly, I felt that The Beach Boys had to do a record outside of California, to get away from that whole scene, find a new scene, and create in that new scene." (Note: The south of France, where the Rolling Stones had recently recorded Exile on Main St., was also under consideration as a possible venue. Johnston stated that he had suggested that the group record their new album in France, "but somehow it ended up being recorded in Holland. I had to secretly come down and do vocals. ... even though I was out of the band, I still sang on albums.")

The Beach Boys in early 1972, months before recording Holland

During the recording of Carl and the Passions – "So Tough", in late February 1972, the band returned to the Netherlands to film a promotional clip for their forthcoming single, "Marcella", and play a televised concert at the RAI Congrescentrum. There, the group decided on the Netherlands as the venue for their next recording project, and where they would set up headquarters for the next several months. A few days later, the band announced drummer Ricky Fataar and guitarist Blondie Chaplin as new additions to their official line-up. Bruce Johnston, who had joined in 1965, resigned from the group in April 1972.

The band had expected to record their Netherlands-based album at a local studio, however, the country's few studios were already overbooked. To get around this, the group commissioned their engineer, Steve Moffit, to design and construct a portable mixing desk – something which had never been done before – and have it shipped to their Netherlands base. This meant dismantling the band's private studio located in Brian Wilson's home. (Note: The components were shipped to Amsterdam in crates that each costed $5,000 in shipping (equivalent to $36,000 in 2025). It took over four weeks to accomplish this.) Later, at the end of May, Moffit discovered a barn in Baambrugge, within 10 miles of Amsterdam, that housed an existing recording studio, which he then converted for the band's own purposes. The group also tasked their publicist, Bill DeSimone, with finding eleven houses for the Beach Boys' entourage, unaware that the Netherlands had suffered from a chronic housing shortage. After two weeks, he successfully secured four houses for the group. From May 5 to June 3, the group toured Europe and the UK while using their new homes and offices around Amsterdam as a base.

Members of the group and their entourage – which included several wives, girlfriends, and relatives; Rieley and his dog; engineers Moffitt, Gordon Rudd, and Jon Parks; assistant Russ Mackie, and secretary Carol Hess and her husband – took residence at various locations within a 30-mile radius of central Amsterdam. Carl and Chaplin lived in Hilversum; Fataar lived in Vreeland; and Mike Love and Al Jardine lived in Bloemendaal. Brian, who had long resisted making the trip, ultimately settled in Laren with his wife Marilyn, their two children Carnie and Wendy, Marilyn's sister Diane Rovell, and a housekeeper. (Note: Wilson's family had initially made the trip without him, leaving him behind in Los Angeles.) It took three attempts for Brian to successfully get on the flight from Los Angeles to Amsterdam. (Note: In the first two attempts, Brian changed his mind after arriving to the airport. On the third, Brian got on the plane, but wandered away after it landed, leaving his ticket and passport. His family found him asleep in the lobby of Schiphol Airport.)

== Production ==
The sessions in Holland lasted from June 3 to August 15, 1972, at the BBC 2 Baambrugge studio near Amsterdam. (Note: Despite a similar name, the studio had no connection to the British Broadcasting Company.) Initially, the studio was in a non-functioning state, as there was not enough time to test the equipment shipped from Los Angeles before the group were due to record. According to biographer Steven Gaines, Moffit "spent eighteen hours a day for the next four and a half weeks trying to get the equipment running. This ruined the touring schedule the Beach Boys expected to keep in Europe, severely limiting the needed income to cover the expense of living in Holland." Al Jardine remembered, "It was rough being in Holland. We were working 24/7 in a small homemade rebuilt piecemeal little studio in a garage next to a cow pasture. Yeah, it was rough. We didn't even have the correct electricity [...] so that kind of affected the sound of our equipment. It was a mixed blessing."

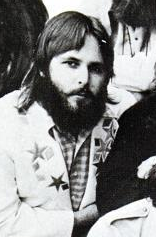
Holland was the last Beach Boys album led by Carl Wilson.

According to Fataar, "Everybody would come in with a piece of a song or a completed song and kind of play around with it and then figure out how we wanted to record it. It was very casual." Carl produced every track on Holland, except for the songs by Dennis Wilson, which Dennis produced himself. In the middle of recording, Dennis moved to the Canary Islands, opting to return to the studio only for certain sessions. Biographer Jon Stebbins explains that Dennis had not felt "comfortable living in Holland".

Brian did not join most of his bandmates' sessions, instead preferring to work alone on late nights. Fataar said, "I can't even remember seeing him in the studio in Holland. Everyone had their own family situation and we'd just go to work and occasionally see each other. It wasn't like a one-big-family thing." Carl recalled, "It was a very creative time for me. Brian had me working on the album very hard so he could have some time for himself. He wasn't really up for doing much, as far as going into the studio every day." Biographer Peter Ames Carlin writes,

Most days [Brian] avoided making the drive over to the studio in Baambrugge, choosing instead to sit in his house while peering out at the countryside, often dulling his senses with pot and glasses of hard apple cider. When Brian did drive off in his rented Mercedes, there was no telling where he might go or what condition he'd be in when he got back. One day he got so drunk that he wrapped the car around a telephone pole. The Mercedes was totaled, but Brian staggered out of the smoking wreckage without a scratch.

At the end of the Holland stay, in early August, the band attended a party hosted by the Dutch record company Bovema Negram, where Rieley announced to local journalists that the Beach Boys' next release would be a double album titled Holland. However, only the album's basic tracks were recorded in Holland; the band subsequently returned to California for further recording. Rieley stayed behind, intending from this point onward to manage the group from his office in Amsterdam. (Note: Years later, the Baambrugge studio was demolished.)

From late September through early October, the band refined the tracks at Village Recorders in Los Angeles, and a master was assembled on October 9. It was expected that the album would be released on November 5, but this motion was halted by Reprise/Warner Bros. executives who felt that the LP was a weak effort and lacked a hit single. The band were displeased; Gaines quoted one Warner Bros. executive as saying, "It was bloodshed. Everybody went wild." To satisfy the record company, the group recorded one more song, "Sail On, Sailor", after which the album was remastered and completed in late November. Production expenses for Holland totaled $250,000 (equivalent to $1.92 million in 2025). Rieley remarked of the exorbitant cost, "Someday accounting will face a column just titled 'Holland.'"

== Songs ==
=== Side one ===
"Sail On, Sailor"
Opening track "Sail On, Sailor", sung by Blondie Chaplin, represented a significant musical departure for the Beach Boys.

"Sail On, Sailor" was written primarily by Van Dyke Parks and Brian Wilson with Rieley, Tandyn Almer, and Ray Kennedy. There are several contradicting accounts of the song's origins. Carlin states that the song was essentially co-written by Wilson and Parks in 1971, with Kennedy and Almer's contributions dating from impromptu sessions at Three Dog Night singer Danny Hutton's house during the epoch. Brian refused to participate on the recording.

"Steamboat" was written by Dennis and Rieley, and sung by Carl. The lyrics reference Robert Fulton, the inventor of the steamboat. Carlin described the song as "a dreamlike journey back to the mythic heart of Mark Twain's America, borne by the insistent chug of an actual steam engine, hurtling keyboard glissandos, and a wonderfully bluesy slide guitar break". Musician Scott McCaughey wrote, "the chugging, almost industrial rhythm bed sounds like a modern sampled tape loop or a latter-day Tom Waits creation."

"California Saga" is a three-part series of songs – "Big Sur", "The Beaks of Eagles", and "California" – that the members of the group produced when they had been feeling homesick. "Big Sur", an acoustic number about rural life in Northern California, is the first song in which Mike Love wrote both the words and music. It was originally recorded during the Surf's Up sessions; the version on Holland is a rerecording. (Note: The original Surf's Up version of "Big Sur" was released on the 2021 compilation Feel Flows.) "The Beaks of Eagles", composed by Jardine, is partly based on Robinson Jeffers' poem of the same name. "California" has Brian, who was otherwise barely present at the group's sessions, singing the opening line "On my way to sunny Californ-i-a". (Note: Jardine remembered, "We came down to the studio to do a mix-down so [Brian] could get home. Then suddenly, [he] came in and said, 'Give me a microphone.' He walked straight in. I hadn't seen him for a month. He walked up to the microphone and started singing, 'I'm on my way to sunny Califon-i-a.' He then left the microphone and walked out".)

=== Side two ===
"The Trader" is a two-part composition by Carl, with lyrics by Rieley, who explained, "Carl was speaking out about the fact that it's wrong to subjugate a people, as so many have been. The Trader is really about racism; these people who got their orders from the king or queen and colonised Africa, for example. The tender part of the song asks the Africans to reply. I believe it's quite touching. I wasn't consciously trying to do something political." According to Carl, the lyrics explore "Manifest Destiny as seen through the eyes of the conquering and the conquered."

"Leaving This Town" was written primarily by Fataar, who said, "I had parts of it and Carl came in the studio and suggested other things, so we were just making it up as we went along." "Only with You" was composed by Dennis, with words by Mike Love, and sung by Carl. "Funky Pretty" was produced by Carl and Brian, and features every member of the group trading the lead vocal.

=== Leftover ===
Among the outtakes, "We Got Love" is an anti-apartheid song by Blondie Chaplin, Fataar, and Love that was dropped from the album's track listing to make way for "Sail On, Sailor". A live recording of "We Got Love" was included on the album The Beach Boys In Concert (1973). "Hard Time" (not to be confused with another song with the title) was written by Chaplin and recorded on October 4. "Pa, Let Her Go Out", written by Brian, was an alternate set of lyrics for the "Better Get Back in Bed" section of the fairy tale. In 2006, a user on a Beach Boys message board shared a recording of Brian singing "Little Children (Daddy Dear)" and "Susie Cincinnati" at a piano, recorded using a tape machine the user lent to Wilson while in Holland. All the songs listed were released on the 2022 archival box set Sail On Sailor – 1972. One song from the sessions, "Lazy Lizzie", was released on We Gotta Groove: The Brother Studio Years.

"Carry Me Home" was written by Dennis, who shared the lead vocal with Chaplin. Stebbins refers to the song as "the most expressive of emotional pain" of any Beach Boys songs. Dennis explained to an interviewer, "I wrote a song intended for Holland about Vietnam. I got the image of a soldier—me—dying in a ditch, and I ended up doing a song about it. The soldier began feeling, 'Why the hell am I here?' Then the coldness started move up his body, from his feet to his legs, to his chest ... until he was dead. See? It was too negative! How could I put that on a Beach Boys album?" The song would have been released on the 2013 box set Made in California had there not already been a large number of Dennis songs on the compilation. Brother Records archive manager Alan Boyd said, "We also felt a little uncomfortable with the idea of at this point in time of Dennis singing (recites lyrics), 'Please God don't let me die'." The song eventually was released fifty years after being recorded, as a teaser single for the Sail On Sailor boxset, which it was also included in.

== Packaging and bonus disc ==
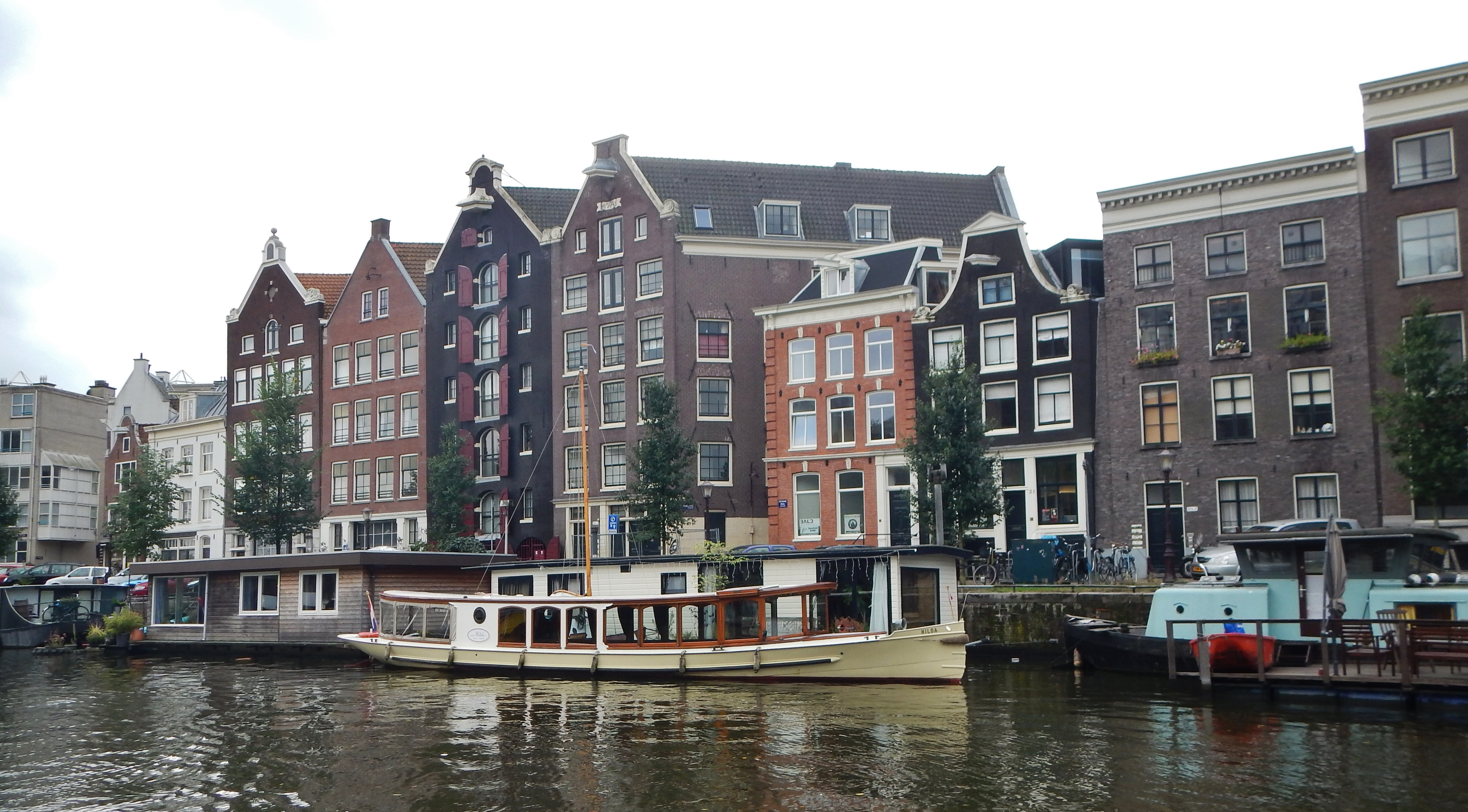
The Kromme Waal canal seen on the Holland cover, pictured in 2013

The front cover depicts (upside down) a tugboat in the Kromme Waal, a canal in central Amsterdam. Holland was packaged with a 12-page booklet that provided a historical overview of the album's making, plus a bonus EP, Mount Vernon and Fairway, that Brian and Carl had produced during the Holland sessions. The EP represented a compromise, as Brian had wanted Mount Vernon and Fairway featured on the album, a proposal that his bandmates had vetoed.

== Release ==
Released on January 8, 1973, Holland peaked at number 36 in the U.S. and number 20 in the UK. Despite having a lower chart showing, the record outsold Carl and the Passions. Lead single "Sail On, Sailor" (backed with "Only with You") was issued in February and reached number 79. In the UK, the lead single was "California Saga/California" (backed with "Sail On, Sailor"), reaching number 75. (Note: Dillon surmised that Jardine's song was chosen as the lead single in the UK because his production of "Cotton Fields" had been the band's last hit there.) In March, the band remixed and overdubbed new vocals onto "California Saga/California" for a U.S. single release. Released in May, the single (backed with "Funky Pretty") reached number 84.

From March 7 to May 17, the Beach Boys embarked on a ten-week U.S. tour with a supporting band that included guitarist Billy Hinsche, keyboardist Carlos Munoz, drummer Joe Pollard, bassist Ed Carter, and percussionist Richard "Didymus" Washington. Their set list included "Funky Pretty", "Leaving This Town", "California Saga/California", and "Sail On, Sailor". According to music historian Keith Badman, critics noted "some unusually long pauses between each song and the group's sometimes negative reaction to any audience requests for oldies." Brian Wilson, who last appeared with his bandmates in concert in 1970, briefly joined them onstage during their encore at the Hollywood Palladium on April 20.

Over the next two years, the group maintained a touring regimen, but recorded very little in the studio. On November 19, Warner/Reprise issued The Beach Boys in Concert, a live double album that became the band's best-selling release on the label. It included live performances of "Sail On, Sailor", "The Trader", "Leaving This Town", "Funky Pretty", and the Holland outtake "We Got Love".

== Critical reception ==
=== Contemporary ===
Holland received generally favorable reviews at the time of release. Rolling Stone's Jim Miller, who was displeased with Carl and the Passions, praised Holland for its "occasionally unnerving simplicity of viewpoint [and] its frequently ornate perfection." The magazine later ranked it among the five best albums of 1973. Robert Christgau of The Village Voice praised the sound quality of Holland, but believed that the album had strayed too far from what the Beach Boys did best, stating, "I suppose that in time their tongue-tied travelogue of Big Sur may seem no more escapist than 'Fun Fun Fun', but who'll ever believe it's equally simple, direct, or innocent?" In Britain, Melody Maker's Richard Williams wrote, "I expect more from the Beach Boys than from anyone else. Holland has the goods."

=== Retrospective ===
Retrospective professional ratings
Review scores
Source	Rating
AllMusic	2.5/5 stars
Blender	2/5 stars
Christgau's Record Guide	C
Encyclopedia of Popular Music	4/5 stars
MusicHound	3/5

Holland became regarded by many fans as the Beach Boys' "last, high-quality original album". Music journalist Peter Doggett opined, "After the false start of Carl And The Passions, Holland proved that the Beach Boys could function as a creative rock band beyond the self-imposed limits of their 60s hits." Mojo's Danny Ecleston referred to Holland as his favorite Beach Boys album, as well as their "least-heard (and certainly last) great record."

The album has been included in some opinion polls and rankings.

- In 1999, it was ranked number 21 in The Guardian's list of the "Top 100 Albums That Don't Appear in All the Other Top 100 Albums of All Time".
- In 2000, it was voted number 648 in the third edition of Colin Larkin's All Time Top 1000 Albums.
- In 2007, it was ranked number 100 in OOR Magazine's list of the "100 Best Albums of All Time".

Less favorably, AllMusic reviewer John Bush rued that Holland was a "surprisingly weak" effort. Douglas Wolk of Blender thought that the band "got way self-indulgent, recording poetry, flutes and Moog solos." Among biographers, Stebbins called the record "a very respectable effort", though "not of the caliber of Pet Sounds or Sunflower". John Tobler praised the "California Saga" trilogy and "The Trader", but decreed, "some of the [other] tracks were less than exceptional".

Brian's 2016 memoir, I Am Brian Wilson, states of Holland: "There are some great songs on that record. 'Steamboat' kicks ass. I really like 'Only with You' and 'Funky Pretty', too. It's a damned good album no matter where or how we made it."

== Influence ==
Elvis Costello ranked the album as one of his favorite records of all time. Tom Petty penned liner notes for the 2000 CD reissue, in which he described the album as "beautiful" and singled out "The Trader" as the album's "centerpiece". Primal Scream covered the Holland outtake "Carry Me Home". Camper Van Beethoven stated that Holland was an enormous inspiration on their 2013 album La Costa Perdida.

== Track listing ==
Side one
No.	Title	Writer(s)	Lead vocal(s)	Length
1.	"Sail On, Sailor"	Brian Wilson, Jack Rieley, Ray Kennedy, Tandyn Almer, Van Dyke Parks	Blondie Chaplin	3:22
2.	"Steamboat"	Dennis Wilson, Rieley	Carl Wilson and Dennis Wilson	4:33
3.	"California Saga/Big Sur"	Mike Love	Mike Love	2:56
4.	"California Saga/The Beaks of Eagles"	Robinson Jeffers, Al Jardine, Lynda Jardine	Love (first and third spoken word verses) and Al Jardine (second spoken word verse, choruses)	3:49
5.	"California Saga/California"	A. Jardine	Love (intro: Brian Wilson)	3:21

Side two
No.	Title	Writer(s)	Lead vocal(s)	Length
1.	"The Trader"	C. Wilson, Rieley	C. Wilson	5:04
2.	"Leaving This Town"	Ricky Fataar, Blondie Chaplin, C. Wilson, Love	Chaplin with Fataar	5:49
3.	"Only with You"	D. Wilson, Love	C. Wilson	2:59
4.	"Funky Pretty"	B. Wilson, Love, Rieley	C. Wilson, Jardine, Chaplin, and Love	4:09
Total length:				36:19

CD and digital bonus tracks (Mount Vernon and Fairway)
No.	Title	Writer(s)	Length
10.	"Mt. Vernon and Fairway – Theme"	B. Wilson	1:34
11.	"I'm the Pied Piper – Instrumental"	B. Wilson, C. Wilson	2:20
12.	"Better Get Back in Bed"	B. Wilson	1:39
13.	"Magic Transistor Radio"	B. Wilson	1:43
14.	"I'm the Pied Piper"	B. Wilson, C. Wilson	2:09
15.	"Radio King Dom"	B. Wilson, Rieley	2:38

2015 Remastered iTunes bonus track
No.	Title	Writer(s)	Lead vocal(s)	Length
16.	"We Got Love"	Fataar, Chaplin, Love	Fataar with Chaplin	5:56

== Personnel ==
Credits from Craig Slowinski, John Brode, Will Crerar and Joshilyn Hoisington. Track numbering refers to CD and digital releases of the album.

The Beach Boys

- Blondie Chaplin – lead (1, 7, 9), backing (1, 7), and round vocals (9); bass (1, 3, 4, 7, 8) and electric guitars (5)
- Ricky Fataar – co-lead (7) and backing vocals (1, 2, 7); drums (all tracks except 9), congas (7); pedal steel guitar (3, 5, 8); Hammond organ (7), ARP Odyssey (7); producer (7)
- Al Jardine – lead (4, 9), harmony (5) and backing vocals (3–5, 8), narration (4); acoustic (3, 4) and electric guitars (5), banjos (5); producer (3–5)
- Mike Love – lead (3, 5, 9), harmony (3, 5), backing (1, 3, 4, 7, 8), and round vocals (9), narration (4)
- Brian Wilson – backing (6, 9) and intro vocals (5); upright piano (9), Moog synthesizers (9); drums (9), congas (9); co-arranger (1), vocal arrangement (6); producer (9)
- Carl Wilson – lead (2, 6, 8, 9), harmony (2, 3, 5, 8), backing (all tracks except 4 and 7), round (9), and response vocals (1); acoustic (2) and electric guitars (1, 6, 8, 9); grand (1) and upright pianos (2–4, 6, 7), Wurlitzer electric piano (1, 6–8), Hammond organ (1, 4–6), ARP Odyssey (1) and Moog synthesizers (5, 6); jaw harp (2); vocal arrangement (6); producer (1, 2, 6, 9)
- Dennis Wilson – harmony (2), backing (2, 8), and bass vocals (2); clavinet (2), Wurlitzer electric piano (2), celeste (2), Moog synthesizers (2), upright piano (8); producer (2, 8)

Touring musician

- Billy Hinsche – backing vocals (9)

Guests

- Gerry Beckley – backing vocals (1, 7)
- Bruce Johnston – backing vocals (5)
- Jack Rieley – backing vocals (2, 6)
- Diane Rovell – backing vocals (4, 9)
- Jonah Wilson – intro voice (6)
- Marilyn Wilson – backing vocals (4, 6, 9)

Session musicians

- Kevin Michaels – tambourine (1), sleigh bells (6)
- Tony Martin Jr. – pedal steel guitar (2)
- Charles Lloyd – flute (4, 5)
- Frank Mayes – baritone saxophone (5), horn arrangement (5)
- Rogier van Otterloo – string arrangement (8)

Unaccounted credits

- Hammond organ (2), ARP Odyssey (2), water chimes (2), diatonic harmonica (3–5); 2 violins (8), viola (8), cello (8)

Technical and production staff

- Stephen Moffitt – engineer (all tracks except 7); co-engineer (1)
- Rob Fraboni – engineer (7); co-engineer (1)
- Jon Parks – second engineer (all tracks)
- United Visuals (Amsterdam) – layout
- Russ Mackie – album photography, art

== Charts ==
Chart (1973)	Peak position
Canadian Album Chart	12
Dutch Album Chart	9
UK Top 40 Album Chart	20
U.S. Billboard Top LPs & Tape	36

== Bibliography ==
- Badman, Keith (2004). The Beach Boys: The Definitive Diary of America's Greatest Band, on Stage and in the Studio. Backbeat Books. ISBN 978-0-87930-818-6.
- Benoit, Shelley (1997) [1973]. "Holland: The Making of an Album". In Abbott, Kingsley (ed.). Back to the Beach: A Brian Wilson and the Beach Boys Reader (1st ed.). London: Helter Skelter. pp. 89–98. ISBN 978-1900924023.
- Carlin, Peter Ames (2006). Catch a Wave: The Rise, Fall, and Redemption of the Beach Boys' Brian Wilson. Rodale. ISBN 978-1-59486-320-2.
- Dillon, Mark (2012). Fifty Sides of the Beach Boys: The Songs That Tell Their Story. ECW Press. ISBN 978-1-77090-198-8.
- Doggett, Peter (1997). "Hold On Dear Brother: The Beach Boys Without Brian Wilson". In Abbott, Kingsley (ed.). Back to the Beach: A Brian Wilson and the Beach Boys Reader (1st ed.). London: Helter Skelter. pp. 99–103. ISBN 978-1900924023.
- Gaines, Steven (1986). Heroes and Villains: The True Story of The Beach Boys. New York: Da Capo Press. ISBN 0306806479.
- Leaf, David (1978). The Beach Boys and the California Myth. New York: Grosset & Dunlap. ISBN 978-0-448-14626-3.
- Stebbins, Jon (2000). Dennis Wilson: The Real Beach Boy. ECW Press. ISBN 978-1-55022-404-7.
- Tobler, John (1978). The Beach Boys. Chartwell Books. ISBN 0890091749.
- White, Timothy (1996). The Nearest Faraway Place: Brian Wilson, the Beach Boys, and the Southern Californian Experience. Macmillan. ISBN 0333649370.
- Wilson, Brian; Greenman, Ben (2016). I Am Brian Wilson: A Memoir. Da Capo Press. ISBN 978-0-306-82307-7.
