= Sail On, Sailor =

Single by the Beach Boys

from the album Holland
- B-side: "Only with You"
- Released: February 1973
- Recorded: November 28, 1972
- Studio: Village, Los Angeles
- Genre: Rock
- Length: 3:22
- Label: Brother/Reprise
- Composers: Brian Wilson; Tandyn Almer; Van Dyke Parks
- Lyricists: Ray Kennedy; Jack Rieley
- Producer: The Beach Boys

The Beach Boys singles chronology
"Marcella" (1972)	"Sail On, Sailor" (1973)	"California Saga/California" (1973)

Audio sample
- file; help

"Sail On, Sailor" (sometimes titled "Sail On Sailor") is a song by American rock band the Beach Boys from their 1973 album Holland. It was written primarily by Van Dyke Parks and Brian Wilson with Ray Kennedy, Tandyn Almer, and Jack Rieley. The lead singer on the song is Blondie Chaplin, making this one of the band's few well-known songs not sung by Mike Love, Brian Wilson or Carl Wilson. The song was released as a single in 1973, backed with "Only with You", and peaked at No. 79 on the Billboard singles chart. A 1975 reissue (also backed with "Only with You") charted higher, at No. 49.

Brian Wilson himself later stated, "It's the only song that we did that I absolutely do not like at all. I never liked 'Sail On, Sailor'." However, Wilson personally selected the song as one of 19 track selections for the compilation Classics Selected by Brian Wilson, saying, "I love how this song rocks." According to biographer Jon Stebbins, the song "is perhaps the only perennial Beach Boys favorite to still thrive in the classic rock and album rock FM radio formats of the present."

== Background ==
=== Initial writing and demo tape ===
Van Dyke Parks, who was then director of audio-visual services at Warner Bros. Records, explained the impetus for the song: "I called [Brian] up out of the clear blue sky and at some point he said, 'Let's write a tune.' It was better than having him stare at the angels on his headboard and write tunes about them." On another occasion, he shared further context,

The entire group [had been] working on a record for delivery to the Warner Bros. label. Mo Ostin held great expectations for that record and suggested that my working with Brian again might goad him to similar creative heights we had reached in Smile. Mo was astonished that Brian wasn't participating in the album, and feeling somewhat deceived, thought I should step forward, as I was in large part the reason for their commitment to the group.

Parks credited himself as the primary composer of "Sail On, Sailor", saying, "I went over to Brian's with my new [tape recorder] and told him the name of the tune and sang those intervals, and he pumped out the rest of that song." In 2002, Wilson said of the song: "Van Dyke really inspired this one. We worked on it originally; then, the other collaborators contributed some different lyrics. By the time the Beach Boys recorded it, the lyrics were all over the place. But I love how this song rocks."

There exists a 15-minute cassette recording of Parks and Wilson writing the song on Wilson's piano. According to Parks, "it's clear from the contents [of the tape] that I authored the words and the musical intervals to 'Sail On, Sailor.' It's also clear that I composed the bridge, played them, and taught them to Brian." Biographer Timothy White quoted an anonymous source's description of the tape's contents, "Brian was playing that song on the piano. It was completely different words. He's singing different words; much better words." One of the discarded lyrical passages in the song was "Fill your sails with fortitude / and ride her stormy waves / You've got to sail on, sail on, sailor".

The tape, according to one report, begins with the following exchange:

Parks: Brian, there's something you gotta do for me, man. I want you to sit down at the piano, and I want you to write a song for me. Lyrics, melody, everything. I want you to do it right on the spot.

Wilson: I'd do anything for you, man, but would you do something for me?

Parks: I'd do anything for you, Brian.

Wilson: Hey, you gotta convince me, Van Dyke, that I'm not insane. Hypnotize me into thinking that I'm not insane. Convince me that I'm not insane.

Parks: Cut the shit, Brian. I want you to write this tune right here.

Another report of the tape's contents details a slightly different exchange:

Wilson: Hypnotize me, Van Dyke.

Parks: Cut the shit, Brian. You're a songwriter, that's what you do, and I want you to sit down and write a song for me.

Wilson: Hypnotize me, Van Dyke, and make me believe I'm not crazy. Convince me I'm not crazy.

Parks: Cut the shit, Brian, and play the tune.

Wilson: What's the name of the tune?

Parks: Sail On, Sailor.

Parks later said, "That was a tough moment for both Brian and me. I just went over to see how he was, and he wasn't good. Of course, you couldn't tell that from this song, because it represents such hope, but it came out of a very difficult time." He remembered, "It was a rare visit. In a five-day rush at that house, I came out with one song." Asked in 1976 about his remarks from the tape, Wilson responded, "I was serious. I used to think I was insane. I'm a lot saner since I've had my doctor."

Parks said that he subsequently "put the tape away, and lay low", as he had "wanted to avoid getting involved with the internecine group dilemmas once again." As of 2006, Parks did not know the whereabouts of the tape, having given it to Warner Bros. in 1972. A four-minute edit of the tape was later released on Sail On Sailor – 1972 (2022).

=== Alterations ===
Biographer Peter Ames Carlin stated that the song was essentially co-written by Wilson and Parks in 1971, with Kennedy and Almer's lyrical contributions dating from impromptu sessions at Three Dog Night singer Danny Hutton's house during the period. (Note: Conversely, in the liner notes written for the 2000 reissue of Holland, Scott McCaughey said that the song was originally written by Wilson with Almer and Kennedy, and that Parks "structur[ed] the song and add[ed] a middle-eight" before Rieley contributed a last minute lyric revision. In 2015, Wilson remembered "writing 'Sail On, Sailor' with a guy named Ray Kennedy. I wrote the music and he wrote the lyrics.") Wilson said in a 2007 interview:

I was at Danny Hutton's one time. Tandyn Almer and I wrote a song, "Sail On, Sailor" [...] on a Wurlitzer electric piano and Ray Kennedy was there and started writing some lyrics. "Ray, I didn’t know you could write lyrics. Keep playing! Keep playing!" We wrote the thing in about an hour and a half or two hours. Later, Van Dyke Parks tweaked it a little bit.

Kennedy recalled that "Sail On, Sailor" had originally been intended by Wilson for Three Dog Night, and that he had written the song with Wilson over the course of three days in 1970:

We went in and cut the basic tracks with Three Dog Night; we hadn't slept in about a week. Then Brian got up with a razor blade and cut the tapes and said, "Only Ray Kennedy or Van Dyke Parks can do this song." And he left. We all stood there looking at each other going, "What?" He called me every day after that, and I wouldn't talk to him. Three or four years later, I heard it on the radio and went, "Who's that?"

Manager Jack Rieley stated that when he was informed by Warner Bros. executives of the song's existence, he took a flight from Holland to Los Angeles and, while staying at a Holiday Inn, devised new lyrics that "reflected how I felt 'lost like a sewer rat alone but I sail…' about having to fly out to LA. Van Dyke contributed additional lyrics." Kennedy later sued to be recognized as the song's co-author. According to Parks, after the lawsuit, "my name and participation diminished, and in some ensuing cases I've been given no royalties or credit at all." Wilson, Almer, and Parks are officially listed as composers, while Rieley and Kennedy are officially listed as lyricists.

== Production ==
In October 1972, Warner rejected the Beach Boys' original version of Holland, which had contained "We Got Love" as the opening track, for lacking a potential hit single. According to Parks, "Holland arrived at the Burbank offices and it was the consensus of everyone in A&R, promotion, and distribution, that the album was 'un-releasable'." Biographer Timothy White writes,

With Holland in limbo and tempers flaring, a business associate close to the problem decided to contact several people near Brian in the hope that Brian either had composed or could be induced to compose a surefire single suitable for inclusion on the album. Among those approached was Van Dyke Parks. Parks was said to have shown up in the executive offices of Warner-Reprise "minutes" after he was telephoned, carrying a cassette of a song called "Sail On Sailor," which Brian had first drafted in the early 1970s.

After discussion among Warner executives, Parks said that he had the aforementioned tape of "Sail On, Sailor", and suggested that the song could be recorded as the album's lead track. The label then enjoined the Beach Boys to drop what the company perceived as the weakest track ("We Got Love") and replace it with the song. By Rieley's account,

We delivered Holland to Warner Bros and I was still in Holland. Brian was in transit back to the States when David Berson from Warners said, "Jack, there’s some gorgeous music on this album but Van Dyke Parks is telling us that you’re holding back a song." Van Dyke had heard an early skeletal version of what later became 'Sail On, Sailor' and raved about it to Warners. He told Mo Ostin and David Berson that I was holding back a great song. I didn't have a clue what he was talking about so I called Brian, and at first he didn’t have an idea either.

According to biographer Steven Gaines,

Ironically, when Mo Ostin and David Berson told the group they wanted to put "Sail on Sailor" on the Holland album and release it as a single, it became impossible for them to get Brian into the studio. When Brian finally got around to working, he started his usual procrastination, tinkering with the song, trying to make it perfect, as he had with "Good Vibrations" and Smile. Finally, the rest of the group did not allow Brian into the studio to work on it at all.

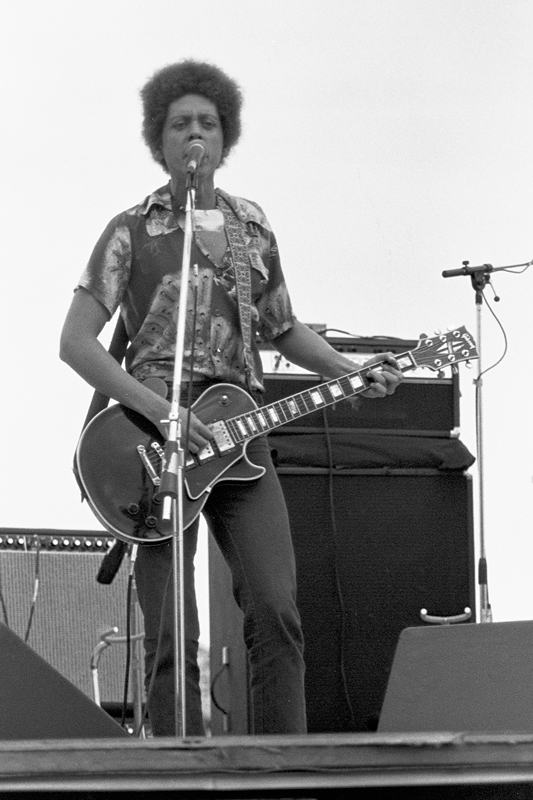
Lead vocalist Blondie Chaplin (1979)

The Beach Boys ultimately recorded the song at Village Recorders on November 28, 1972, with production by Carl Wilson. Brian remembered being "grossly incompetent" with the song and that he had failed to show up to the sessions. Ricky Fataar said, "I remember Carl called Brian to say 'Is this the right chord?' and 'What kind of a groove is it?' Brian was at home on the telephone telling us what to do with the song. He came up with this idea that Carl should play a part that was sort of like an SOS, Morse code signal ... 'Dd-dd-dd dd-dd-dd', and Carl went out and played that and it was just right."

The lead vocal was first attempted by Dennis Wilson, who sang the vocal once before leaving to go surfing. Carl was the next to attempt a vocal, but he then suggested that Blondie Chaplin make an attempt. After two takes, Carl decided that Chaplin's vocal would feature as the lead.

== Release ==
"Sail On, Sailor" was released as the lead single from Holland in February 1973, backed with "Only with You", and peaked at No. 79 on the Billboard Hot 100. On March 10, 1975, it was reissued (also backed with "Only with You") and charted higher, at No. 49.

In the UK, "Sail On, Sailor" was issued as a single in June 1975 and failed to chart. Pet Sounds lyricist Tony Asher, despite expressing distaste for much of the band's work after ceasing his collaboration with Brian Wilson, praised the song as "just dandy".

== Personnel ==
Credits from Craig Slowinski, John Brode, Will Crerar, and Joshilyn Hoisington.

The Beach Boys

- Blondie Chaplin – lead and backing vocals, bass guitar
- Ricky Fataar – backing vocals, drums
- Mike Love – backing vocals
- Carl Wilson – backing vocals, grand piano, Wurlitzer electric piano, electric guitar, Hammond organ, ARP Odyssey synthesizers, producer

Additional musicians

- Gerry Beckley – backing vocals
- Kevin Michaels – tambourine

== Cover versions ==
- 1976 – KGB, KGB (Ray Kennedy on lead vocals)
- 1977 – Steve Hunter, Swept Away
- 1980 – Ray Kennedy, Ray Kennedy
- 1986 – Ray Charles, The Beach Boys 25 Years Together: A Celebration in Waikiki
- 1995 – Golden Earring, Love Sweat
- 1996 – Shawn Colvin, Head Above Water
- 2001 – Darius Rucker & Matthew Sweet, An All-Star Tribute to Brian Wilson
- 2002 – The Bluetones, "After Hours"
- 2002 – Sting with Lulu, Together
- 2003 – Jimmy Buffett, Meet Me In Margaritaville: The Ultimate Collection
- 2007 – Jamie Cullum, Musicares Presents A Tribute to Brian Wilson
- 2007 – Sean Lennon & Mark Ronson, BBC Electric Proms
- 2021 – A.J. Croce, By Request
- 2021 – Mitch Rocket, 1979/Sail On Sailor
- 2021 – Los Lobos, Native Sons

== Charts ==
Chart (1973)	Peak position
Canada RPM Adult Contemporary	52
Netherlands	73
U.S. Billboard Hot 100	79
U.S. Cash Box Top 100	96

Chart (1975)	Peak position
Canada RPM Top Singles	73
U.S. Billboard Hot 100	49
U.S. Cash Box Top 100	62

== Bibliography ==
- Badman, Keith (2004). The Beach Boys: The Definitive Diary of America's Greatest Band, on Stage and in the Studio. Backbeat Books. ISBN 978-0-87930-818-6.
- Carlin, Peter Ames (2006). Catch a Wave: The Rise, Fall, and Redemption of the Beach Boys' Brian Wilson. Rodale. ISBN 978-1-59486-320-2.
- Gaines, Steven (1986). Heroes and Villains: The True Story of The Beach Boys. New York: Da Capo Press. ISBN 0306806479.
- Hoskyns, Barney (2007). Hotel California: The True-Life Adventures of Crosby, Stills, Nash, Young, Mitchell, Taylor, Browne, Ronstadt, Geffen, the Eagles, and Their Many Friends. John Wiley and Sons. ISBN 978-0-470-12777-3.
- Stebbins, Jon (2011). The Beach Boys FAQ: All That's Left to Know About America's Band. Backbeat Books. ISBN 9781458429148.
- Priore, Dominic (2005). Smile: The Story of Brian Wilson's Masterpiece. Sanctuary Publishing Ltd. ISBN 1-86074-627-6.
- White, Timothy (1996). The Nearest Faraway Place: Brian Wilson, the Beach Boys, and the Southern Californian Experience. Macmillan. ISBN 0333649370.
