= Sail On Sailor – 1972 =

Box set by the Beach Boys
- Released: December 2, 2022
- Recorded: December 4, 1971 – November 26, 1993
- Length: 6:00:52
- Label: Capitol/UME
- Producer: The Beach Boys (original recordings); Mark Linett, Alan Boyd (compilation)

The Beach Boys chronology
Feel Flows (2021)	Sail On Sailor – 1972 (2022)	The Beach Boys: Music From The Documentary (2024)

Sail On Sailor – 1972 is an expanded reissue of the albums Carl and the Passions – "So Tough" (1972) and Holland (1973) by American rock band the Beach Boys. Produced by engineer Mark Linett and Brother Records archive manager Alan Boyd, it was released by Capitol/UME on December 2, 2022. The title is taken from the Holland track "Sail On, Sailor".

== Background ==
In August 2021, Capitol/UME issued Feel Flows: The Sunflower & Surf's Up Sessions 1969–1971, which included versions of the "So Tough" tracks "Marcella" and "You Need a Mess of Help to Stand Alone". A follow-up to Feel Flows was first officially announced in a press release from April 2022 that discussed the Beach Boys' "60th anniversary celebration". The track listing, title, and release date for Sail On Sailor – 1972 was revealed on September 27. The original release date was to be November 18.

Sail On Sailor – 1972 was issued in multiple configurations. The six-disc Super Deluxe Edition box set contains 105 tracks, 80 of which were previously unreleased, including "Hard Time", "Carry Me Home", "Out in the Country", "Oh Sweet Something", "Spark in the Dark", "Rooftop Harry", "Body Talk (Grease Job)", "Pa Let Her Go Out (Better Get Back in Bed)", "Little Child (Daddy Dear)", and a medley of "Gimme Some Lovin'" and "I Need Your Love".

== Critical reception ==
Professional ratings
Aggregate scores
Source	Rating
Metacritic	82/100
Review scores
Source	Rating
AllMusic	4/5 stars
American Songwriter	3.5/5 stars
Spin	4/5 stars
Uncut	4/5 stars

At Metacritic, which assigns a normalized rating out of 100 to reviews from critics, Sail On Sailor received an average score of 82 based on six reviews, indicating "universal acclaim". AllMusic contributor Tim Sendra called it "a fine archival release" and "fascinating listening."

Reviewing the set for American Songwriter, Hal Horowitz decreed, "This wasn’t a tremendously fertile period for the group. Yet based on the animated gig and some inspired moments, they still sounded vital, and capable of writing impressive new music, albeit inconsistently and largely without Brian’s input." John Robinson of Spin wrote that listeners would likely "have mixed feelings" about this period in the band's history, although "[m]uch of the music is still delightful".

Mark Smotroff of Analog Planet felt that the set had a better mastering job than that afforded to Feel Flows.

== Track listing ==
=== 6-CD super deluxe edition ===
Disc one: Carl and the Passions – "So Tough"
No.	Title	Writer(s)	Length
1.	"You Need a Mess of Help to Stand Alone"	Brian Wilson, Jack Rieley	3:26
2.	"Here She Comes"	Ricky Fataar, Blondie Chaplin	5:06
3.	"He Come Down"	Al Jardine, B. Wilson, Mike Love	4:42
4.	"Marcella"	B. Wilson, Rieley, Tandyn Almer	3:50
5.	"Hold On, Dear Brother"	Fataar, Chaplin	4:42
6.	"Make It Good"	Dennis Wilson, Daryl Dragon	2:32
7.	"All This Is That"	A. Jardine, Carl Wilson, Love	3:58
8.	"Cuddle Up"	D. Wilson, Dragon	5:29
9.	"The Road Not Taken" (Demo)	A. Jardine, Robert Frost	2:23
10.	"All This Is That" (a cappella)		3:11
11.	"He Come Down" (2022 mix)		4:37
12.	"You Need a Mess of Help to Stand Alone" (track & backing vocals)		3:24
13.	"Marcella" (a cappella)		3:43
14.	"Make It Good" (alternate mix with intro)		3:09
15.	"Cuddle Up" (alternate mix)		4:48
16.	"Carl and the Passions/Pet Sounds promo"		1:02

Disc two: Holland
No.	Title	Writer(s)	Length
1.	"Sail On, Sailor"	B. Wilson, Almer, Ray Kennedy, Rieley, Parks	3:19
2.	"Steamboat"	D. Wilson, Rieley	4:34
3.	"California Saga (Big Sur)"	Love	2:55
4.	"California Saga (The Beaks of Eagles)"	Robinson Jeffers, A. Jardine, Lynda Jardine	3:49
5.	"California Saga (California)"	A. Jardine	3:23
6.	"The Trader"	C. Wilson, Rieley	5:06
7.	"Leaving This Town"	R. Fataar, Chaplin, C. Wilson, Love	5:47
8.	"Only with You"	D. Wilson, Love	3:00
9.	"Funky Pretty"	B. Wilson, Love, Rieley	4:12
10.	"Mount Vernon and Fairway – Theme"	B. Wilson	1:34
11.	"I'm the Pied Piper" (instrumental)	B. Wilson, C. Wilson	2:19
12.	"Better Get Back in Bed"	B. Wilson	1:38
13.	"Magic Transistor Radio" (2022 mix)	B. Wilson	0:47
14.	"I'm the Pied Piper" (2022 mix)	B. Wilson, C. Wilson	3:00
15.	"Radio King Dom"	B. Wilson, Rieley	2:40
16.	"We Got Love" (2022 mix)	R. Fataar, Chaplin, Love	5:28
17.	"Hard Time"	R. Fataar, Chaplin	3:17
18.	"Carry Me Home"	D. Wilson	3:26
19.	"California Saga (The Beaks of Eagles)" (1973 single mix)		3:49
20.	"California Saga (California)" (1973 single mix)		3:16
21.	"Sail On, Sailor" (backing track/2022 mix)		3:21
22.	"Holland Promo 1"		1:03

Disc three: Live at Carnegie Hall
No.	Title	Writer(s)	Length
1.	"Concert Intro: Jack Rieley"		2:06
2.	"Sloop John B"	traditional, arrangement by B. Wilson	3:08
3.	"You Need a Mess of Help to Stand Alone"		3:40
4.	"Leaving This Town"		6:11
5.	"Darlin'"	B. Wilson, Love	3:34
6.	"Only with You"		4:02
7.	"Heroes and Villains"	B. Wilson, Parks	3:57
8.	"Long Promised Road"	C. Wilson, Rieley	4:36
9.	"Don't Worry Baby"	B. Wilson, Roger Christian	4:41
10.	"Student Demonstration Time"	Jerry Lieber, Mike Stoller, Love	5:29
11.	"I Get Around"	B. Wilson, Love	2:44

Disc four: Live at Carnegie Hall
No.	Title	Writer(s)	Length
1.	"Intro to 2nd Set: Jack Rieley"		0:25
2.	"Marcella"		3:27
3.	"California Saga (California)"		3:30
4.	"Help Me, Rhonda"	B. Wilson, Love	5:56
5.	"Let the Wind Blow"	B. Wilson, Love	5:26
6.	"Medley: Wonderful / Don't Worry, Bill"	B. Wilson, Parks, R. Fataar, Chaplin, Steve Fataar, Brother Fataar	6:02
7.	"God Only Knows"	B. Wilson, Asher	2:55
8.	"Do It Again"	B. Wilson, Love	3:53
9.	"Wouldn't It Be Nice"	B. Wilson, Asher, Love	2:47
10.	"Wild Honey"	B. Wilson, Love	5:38
11.	"Good Vibrations"	B. Wilson, Love	6:34
12.	"California Girls"	B. Wilson, Love	2:53
13.	"Surfin' U.S.A."	B. Wilson, Chuck Berry	2:30
14.	"Fun, Fun, Fun"	B. Wilson, Love	2:52
15.	"Jumpin' Jack Flash"	Mick Jagger, Keith Richards	5:02

Disc five: 1972 sessions
No.	Title	Writer(s)	Length
1.	"You Need a Mess of Help to Stand Alone" (a cappella)		2:44
2.	"Marcella" (track & backing vocals)		3:08
3.	"Here She Comes" (session excerpt)		2:18
4.	"Here She Comes" (2022 mix)		5:10
5.	"He Come Down" (a cappella section)		1:23
6.	"Hold On, Dear Brother" (track & backing vocals)		4:28
7.	"Steamboat" (track & backing vocals)		4:30
8.	"California Saga (California)" (track & backing vocals)		3:16
9.	"The Trader" (track & backing vocals)		5:03
10.	"The Trader" (second section a cappella)		2:42
11.	"Only with You" (alternate mix)		2:54
12.	"Funky Pretty" (track & backing vocals)		3:54
13.	"Sail On, Sailor" (songwriting session)	B. Wilson, Parks	4:04
14.	"Sail On, Sailor" (a cappella)		3:10
15.	"Out in the Country" (version 1)	B. Wilson, Don Goldberg	3:01
16.	"Out in the Country" (version 2)		2:13
17.	"Oh Sweet Something"	R. Fataar, Chaplin	3:59
18.	"Spark in the Dark"	B. Wilson	3:55
19.	"Rooftop Harry"	B. Wilson	3:00
20.	"Body Talk (Grease Job)"	B. Wilson	2:53
21.	"Holland Promo 2"		1:02

Disc six: Bonus tracks
No.	Title	Writer(s)	Length
1.	"We Got Love" (live 1973)		6:03
2.	"California Saga (Big Sur)" (live 1973)		3:00
3.	"Funky Pretty" (live 1973)		4:17
4.	"The Trader" (live 1975)		5:28
5.	"Sail On, Sailor" (live 1975)		3:41
6.	"All This Is That" (live 1993)		4:14
7.	"Fairy Tale Music" (2022 mix)		4:37
8.	"Pa Let Her Go Out (Better Get Back in Bed)" (alternate version with intro)	B. Wilson	1:18
9.	"I'm the Pied Piper" (a cappella section)		0:31
10.	"Radio King Dom" (a cappella section)	B. Wilson	0:38
11.	"I'm the Pied Piper" (alternate take / spoken section)	B. Wilson	0:47
12.	"Mount Vernon and Fairway – Theme / A Casual Look" (medley / session excerpt)	B. Wilson, Ed Wells	2:58
13.	"Little Child (Daddy Dear)" (home recording)	Wayne Shanklin	1:19
14.	"Susie Cincinnati" (home recording)	A. Jardine	1:08
15.	"Gimme Some Lovin' / I Need Your Love" (medley)	Steve Winwood, Spencer Davis, Muff Winwood, B. Wilson	3:57
16.	"California Saga (Big Sur)" (2022 Saga Trilogy)		2:55
17.	"California Saga (The Beaks of Eagles)" (2022 Saga Trilogy)		2:27
18.	"California Saga (California)" (2022 Saga Trilogy)		3:23
19.	"Carry Me Home" (track and backing vocals)		3:23
20.	"All This Is That" (a cappella / alternate verse)		0:18

=== 5-LP super deluxe limited edition ===
LP one: Carl And The Passions - "So Tough"
No.	Title	Length
1.	"You Need a Mess of Help to Stand Alone"
2.	"Here She Comes"
3.	"He Come Down"
4.	"Marcella"
5.	"Hold On, Dear Brother"
6.	"Make It Good"
7.	"All This Is That"
8.	"Cuddle Up"

LP two: Holland
No.	Title	Length
1.	"Sail On, Sailor"
2.	"Steamboat"
3.	"California Saga (Big Sur)"
4.	"California Saga (The Beaks of Eagles)"
5.	"California Saga (California)"
6.	"The Trader"
7.	"Leaving This Town"
8.	"Only with You"
9.	"Funky Pretty"

7-inch EP: Mount Vernon and Fairway
No.	Title	Length
1.	"Mount Vernon and Fairway – Theme"
2.	"I'm the Pied Piper"
3.	"Better Get Back in Bed" (instrumental)
4.	"Magic Transistor Radio"
5.	"I'm the Pied Piper"
6.	"Radio King Dom"

LP three: Live at Carnegie Hall (first set)
No.	Title	Length
1.	"Concert Intro: Jack Rieley"
2.	"Sloop John B"
3.	"You Need a Mess of Help to Stand Alone"
4.	"Leaving This Town"
5.	"Darlin'"
6.	"Only with You"
7.	"Heroes and Villains"
8.	"Long Promised Road"
9.	"Don't Worry Baby"
10.	"Student Demonstration Time"
11.	"I Get Around"

LP four: Live at Carnegie Hall (second set)
No.	Title	Length
1.	"Intro to 2nd Set: Jack Rieley"
2.	"Marcella"
3.	"California Saga (California)"
4.	"Help Me, Rhonda"
5.	"Let the Wind Blow"
6.	"Wonderful / Don't Worry, Bill"
7.	"God Only Knows"
8.	"Do It Again"
9.	"Wouldn't It Be Nice"
10.	"Wild Honey"

LP five: Live at Carnegie Hall (second set continued) / Bonus tracks
No.	Title	Length
1.	"Good Vibrations"
2.	"California Girls"
3.	"Surfin U.S.A."
4.	"Fun, Fun, Fun"
5.	"Jumpin' Jack Flash"
6.	"We Got Love" (2022 mix)
7.	"Hard Time"
8.	"Carry Me Home"
9.	"Fairy Tale Music" (2022 mix)

=== 2-LP editions ===
==== LP one ====
Carl and the Passions – "So Tough" – as above

==== LP two ====
Holland – as above

==== 7" EP ====
Mount Vernon and Fairway – as above

=== 2-CD edition ===
Disc one: Carl and the Passions – "So Tough" + bonus tracks
No.	Title	Length
1.	"You Need a Mess of Help to Stand Alone"
2.	"Here She Comes"
3.	"He Come Down"
4.	"Marcella"
5.	"Hold On, Dear Brother"
6.	"Make It Good"
7.	"All This Is That"
8.	"Cuddle Up"
9.	"The Road Not Taken" (demo)
10.	"All This Is That" (a cappella)
11.	"He Come Down" (2022 mix)
12.	"You Need a Mess of Help to Stand Alone" (track & backing vocals)
13.	"Marcella" (a cappella)
14.	"Make It Good" (alternate mix with intro)
15.	"Cuddle Up" (alternate mix)
16.	"Carl and the Passions/Pet Sounds promo"
17.	"Intro to 2nd Set: Jack Rieley" (live at Carnegie Hall)
18.	"You Need a Mess of Help to Stand Alone" (live at Carnegie Hall)
19.	"Marcella" (live at Carnegie Hall)
20.	"Only with You" (live at Carnegie Hall)
21.	"Big Sur" (live at Carnegie Hall)
22.	"Funky Pretty" (live at Carnegie Hall)

Disc two: Holland + bonus tracks
No.	Title	Length
1.	"Sail On, Sailor"
2.	"Steamboat"
3.	"California Saga (Big Sur)"
4.	"California Saga (The Beaks of Eagles)"
5.	"California Saga (California)"
6.	"The Trader"
7.	"Leaving This Town"
8.	"Only with You"
9.	"Funky Pretty"
10.	"Mount Vernon and Fairway – Theme"
11.	"I'm the Pied Piper" (instrumental)
12.	"Better Get Back in Bed"
13.	"Magic Transistor Radio" (2022 mix)
14.	"I'm the Pied Piper" (2022 mix)
15.	"Radio King Dom"
16.	"We Got Love" (2022 mix)
17.	"Hard Time"
18.	"Carry Me Home"
19.	"California Saga (The Beaks of Eagles)" (1973 single mix)
20.	"California Saga (California)" (1973 single mix)
21.	"Sail On, Sailor" (2022 mix)
22.	"Holland Promo 1"
23.	"Sail On, Sailor" (live 1975)

== Charts ==
Chart performance for Sail On Sailor – 1972
Chart (2022)	Peak position
German Albums (Offizielle Top 100)	84

== See also ==
- List of unreleased songs recorded by the Beach Boys
