= Carl and the Passions – "So Tough" =

1972 album by the Beach Boys

Studio album by the Beach Boys
- Released: May 15, 1972
- Recorded: December 4, 1971 – April 13, 1972
- Studios: Beach Boys; Sunset Sound; Village; Sound City (Los Angeles)
- Genres: Rock; R&B
- Length: 34:12
- Labels: Brother; Reprise
- Producer: The Beach Boys

The Beach Boys chronology
Surf's Up (1971)	Carl and the Passions – "So Tough" (1972)	Holland (1973)

Singles from Carl and the Passions – "So Tough"
- 1. "You Need a Mess of Help to Stand Alone" Released: May 15, 1972; 2. "Marcella" Released: June 26, 1972

Carl and the Passions – "So Tough" is the eighteenth studio album by American rock band the Beach Boys, released May 15, 1972 on Brother/Reprise. The album is a significant musical departure for the band and is the first to feature the Flames' Blondie Chaplin and Ricky Fataar as additions to their official line-up. Band member Bruce Johnston left the group during the album's recording. It sold poorly and was met with lukewarm reviews, but later gained stature as a cult favorite among fans.

The album peaked at number 50 in the U.S. and number 25 in the UK. It produced two singles, "You Need a Mess of Help to Stand Alone" and "Marcella", both of which failed to chart in the U.S. Initial American pressings of the album included the band's 1966 release Pet Sounds as a bonus record. In 2022, an expanded version of the album was packaged within the compilation Sail On Sailor – 1972.

== Background ==
In June 1969, Carl Wilson attended a nightclub performance by the South African band the Flames in London. Impressed by what he saw, he later invited the group to the United States to sign with the Beach Boys' record label, Brother Records. From 1970 to 1971, the Flames were the Beach Boys' supporting act. Carl also produced the group's first album, The Flame, released in March 1971 as the only non-Beach Boys album ever issued by Brother. (Note: The Flames broke up before the second album, attempted in late 1971, could be finished.) After Dennis Wilson injured his hand, leaving him unable to play drums for a period, he was substituted onstage by the Flames' Ricky Fataar (and briefly touring musician Mike Kowalski).

The Beach Boys' second album on Reprise Records, Surf's Up, was released in August 1971 to critical acclaim and reached the U.S. and UK top 40. In late 1971, some reports stated that Dennis had left the group to work on his first solo album. According to biographer David Leaf, "Dennis was [at that time] constantly quitting [the band] or getting fired and then rejoining." By then, Fataar and the Flames' guitarist Blondie Chaplin were participating in the Beach Boys' recording sessions, and at Carl's and manager Jack Rieley's behest, soon became official members. Music historian Keith Badman attributes this decision to Carl's desire "to invigorate" the band "both musically and personally" at a time when factions of the group travelled "to and from every concert separately" and occasionally arrived "on stage from different entrances, just to avoid being with each other."

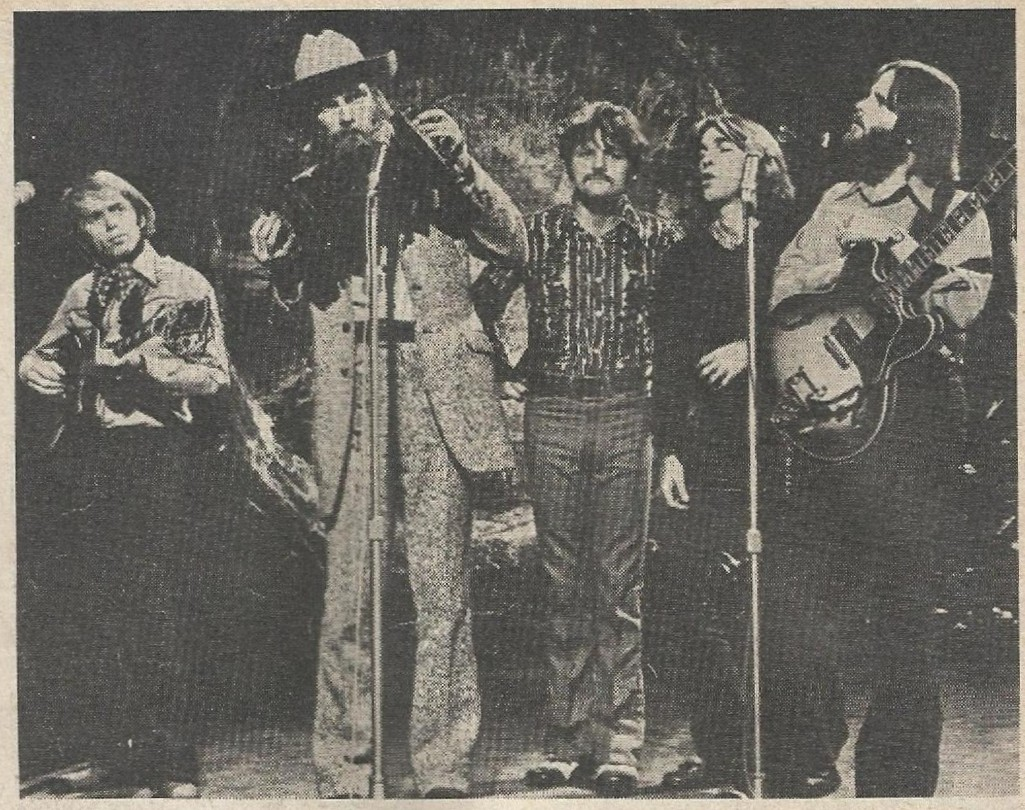
The Beach Boys performing in early 1972 before Bruce Johnston's departure in April. From left: Al Jardine, Mike Love, Johnston, Dennis Wilson, and Carl Wilson.

On February 29, 1972, the group held a press conference in London, where they announced the new additions in their line-up, as well as the imminent release of the album Smile, which had been shelved since 1967. Smile was never delivered; Leaf writes that the purpose of the latter announcement may have been to mislead Reprise into allowing the group more time to prepare the album that became Carl and the Passions. Bruce Johnston, who had joined the group in 1965, left the Beach Boys in April 1972 due to creative differences between him and his bandmates.

== Production ==
Sessions for the Beach Boys' third Reprise album lasted from December 4, 1971 to April 13, 1972, and were held largely at the band's private studio. Most of the basic tracks were recorded in December 1971, with the remainder of the album finished during the following April. The members worked in three separate factions: Carl, Fataar, and Chaplin; Love and Jardine; and Dennis with touring musician Daryl Dragon. Fataar stated, "It was just all done very piecemeal. Somebody would be cutting a track over at Village Recorders and somebody else would be recording at Sunset [...] It was an 'in between touring' kind of an album. [...] We kept changing studios all the time. Perhaps that's why it sounds so bad."

During this time, Brian Wilson, who had reduced his contributions to the group, was largely preoccupied spending time with Tandyn Almer. (Note: Brian's then-wife Marilyn recalled, "Brian spent months at Tandyn's place, day and night. In fact, I remember sleeping at Tandyn's house for two or three nights in a row.") Brian was absent for most of the sessions, and was more involved with producing the 1972 self-titled debut album by Spring, a collaboration with David Sandler. (Note: Sandler was under consideration to co-produce Carl and the Passions. Explaining why this never happened, Sandler commented, "There were personality things, family things, going on.") Chaplin stated, "We recorded some tracks in the studio at Brian's home. But most of the time he was up in his bedroom while we were working downstairs." In an interview held shortly after the release of Carl and the Passions, Johnston said: "I spoke to Brian a couple of weeks ago and he told me that he really didn't have too much to do with this album. [...] I don't hear his voice very much on this album." (Note: Johnston's decision to leave the band was partly due to his unhappiness with Wilson's creative withdrawal from the group.) Wilson's participation on the album's songs was limited to the three that he had co-written.

== Songs and outtakes ==
The recordings were very spontaneous. [We] branched out and did types of songs that we hadn't done in the past: gospel, some with the sound of a choir, and a couple from Ricky and Blondie that have a rock feel. When Carl writes now, he has that Brianesque feel.

— Mike Love, 1972

Brian's three song contributions were "You Need a Mess of Help to Stand Alone" (co-written with Rieley and co-produced with Carl), "Marcella" (co-written with Rieley and Almer), and "He Come Down" (co-written with Al Jardine and Love). "Marcella" was written about a masseuse from the Circus Maximus, a Santa Monica Boulevard massage parlor that Brian had frequented. "You Need a Mess of Help to Stand Alone" was originally written with Almer as "Beatrice from Baltimore" before the lyrics were revised by Rieley. "He Comes Down" was influenced by gospel and features Brian on keyboards and backing vocals. Love said, "On that one we're singing like a whole black church choir and it's a lot of fun. Basically it underscores the teachings of Jesus and Krishna and the Maharishi."

Dennis's two song contributions – "Make it Good" and "Cuddle Up" (originally titled "Old Movie") – were written with Daryl Dragon and originally intended for a cancelled solo album. Both of the songs are in a heavy orchestral style that is unlike any of the other songs on the largely R&B-based record. "All This Is That" (written by Carl, Jardine, and Love) was inspired by Maharishi Mahesh Yogi's Transcendental Meditation teachings and the Robert Frost poem "The Road Not Taken".

The Fataar–Chaplin team contributed two rock songs, "Here She Comes" and "Hold On Dear Brother". Biographer Mark Dillon writes, "The piano on their groovy cut 'Here She Comes' sounds like Traffic and the harmonies are in the Crosby, Stills and Nash vein. [...] Blondie sings the lead, as he does on [...] 'Hold On Dear Brother,' to which Ricky adds haunting steel guitar."

Unused tracks include "Oh Sweet Something", "Out in the Country", "Spark in the Dark", "Rooftop Harry", "Body Talk (Grease Job)" and a medley of "Gimme Some Lovin'" / "I Need Your Love", all of which were released on the 2022 compilation Sail On Sailor – 1972. "Rooftop Harry" is an instrumental that features Brian playing piano, electric bass, toy piano, and a calliope. Bruce Johnston recorded a discarded track, "Ten Years Harmony", with a re-recording by the supergroup California Music later released in 1974. The song later evolved into "Endless Harmony" from Keepin' the Summer Alive (1980). Still-unreleased material that was recorded during the album's sessions include "Funky Fever" and a cover version of Stephen Stills' "Change Partners".

== Packaging and bonus disc ==
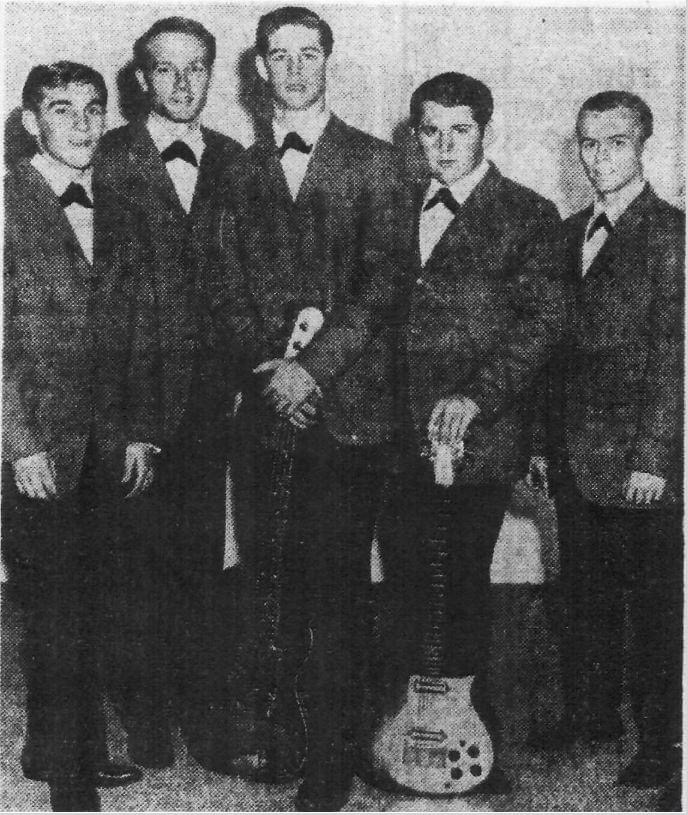
The album's title is a reference to a precursory iteration of the Beach Boys (pictured in 1961)

Some reports, including from the Wilsons' mother, state that "Carl and the Passions" had been a high school band formed by Brian, Mike Love, Carl, and another friend. Brian said that he had named the early band "Carl and the Passions" as a way to entice his unwilling brother into the group. However, Carl himself denied that such a group ever existed. Rieley recalled, "The original concept was to do an album called Landlocked, but they were under pressure to tour. There wasn't time to develop the depth that album would have required." (Note: Landlocked was also a working title for Surf's Up.) Instead, the band went with the title Carl and the Passions – "So Tough" as a nod toward Carl's increased leading role in the Beach Boys.

The inner sleeve included a group portrait featuring all the members together, including Brian. However, owing to his absence during much of the album's recording, his visage had to be doctored into the photo.

In the U.S., Carl and the Passions was originally packaged as a two-disc set, paired with Pet Sounds (1966), at no additional cost to consumers. Mike Love explained that the group had recently bought the rights to five of their out-of-print Capitol albums for seven years. Love said, "The thing we want to do is a combination of bringing everyone up to date and giving everyone a chance to get an old collectors' item that has been discontinued by the record company. Americans have to write to England if they want copies of albums like Smiley Smile." He credited the idea to Warner/Reprise.

Music journalist Peter Doggett states that the bonus record was originally planned to have been Smile. "That threat brought Brian Wilson down from his bedroom, and Pet Sounds was reissued instead."

== Release ==
Released on May 15, 1972, Carl and the Passions – "So Tough" reached number 50 in the U.S. The release was accompanied by lead single "You Need a Mess of Help to Stand Alone", which failed to chart. A second single, "Marcella", released on June 26, also failed to chart. According to music historian Keith Badman, the Pet Sounds pairing provoked "an unfavourable comparison with the landmark 1966 LP and contribute[d] to the album stalling [...] in the US charts." It became the band's worst-selling on Reprise. In the UK, where Carl and the Passions was issued as a standalone disc, the album reached number 25. (Note: Love said to the NME, "In England, it's coming out as a single album, because we couldn't get the rights to the old albums over here.")

From May 5 to June 3, the group toured Europe and the UK. The core members were supported onstage by guitarists Ed Carter and Billy Hinsche, keyboardists Daryl Dragon and Toni Tennille, as well as a horn section and two additional percussionists. Their set list included "Here She Comes" and "You Need a Mess of Help to Stand Alone". They appeared on The Old Grey Whistle Test on May 16 and Top of the Pops on May 31 (aired June 8). Elton John and Keith Moon joined them onstage at a concert in London. At the end of the tour, the band reconvened at their new headquarters in Holland and recorded what became the Holland album.

== Critical reception ==
Retrospective professional ratings
Review scores
Source	Rating
AllMusic	3.5/5 stars
Blender	2/5 stars
Christgau's Record Guide	C+
Encyclopedia of Popular Music	3/5 stars
MusicHound	3/5
The Rolling Stone Album Guide	2/5 stars

Carl and the Passions – "So Tough" failed to impress most critics. According to Leaf, the Pet Sounds pairing in America "helped make So Tough seem like the Beach Boys' worst album ever. Long-time Beach Boys fans were incensed that two of the eight cuts were by 'outsiders' (Blondie and Ricky), and nobody was particularly stimulated by the preachy tone of the TM tunes." General consensus holds "Marcella" to be the LP's finest song.

Robert Christgau of The Village Voice called the album "[f]airly pleasant, but even the highlights aren't all that hot." Rolling Stone's Stephen Davis felt that only four tracks were "acceptable", and that Brian's lack of genuine involvement hurt the album. (Note: Davis' review devoted more writing space to Pet Sounds than the new album.) NME's Josh Ingham called it "probably the least successful of the Beach Boys' albums." Conversely, in his review for The San Diego Door, Cameron Crowe wrote, "So Tough finds some excellent music with no trace of anything left over from the Pet Sounds days. I coulda sworn 'Hold On Dear Brother' was the Band."

Retrospectively, AllMusic's John Bush wrote, "The songwriting was neither as solid as 1970's Sunflower nor as idiosyncratic as 1971's Surf's Up though, and the few fans left from the '60s were undoubtedly turned off – if not by the weak songs, then certainly by the muddy sound. Still, there are a few moments of beauty". Doggett opined, "There were sublime moments [...] But unlike Sunflower and Surf's Up it sounded nothing like the work of a coherent band." He noted that Dennis' contributions were "magnificent epics, explorations of the heart in sound" that showed "his vision was way out of kilter the rest of the band"

Among biographers, John Tobler decreed in 1978 that Carl and the Passions was "generally accepted as being the lamest Beach Boy album since the fragmented 20/20 [and] bears the mark of a project with too little thought behind it." Peter Ames Carlin found the album to be "a schizophrenic affair" and "stylistically meandering". Jon Stebbins writes that apart from "Marcella", "Cuddle Up", and "Make It Good", the album "is forgettable".

In his 2016 memoir, Good Vibrations: My Life as a Beach Boy, Mike Love referred to Carl and the Passions as "a disjointed rush job, hastily assembled between live gigs, that even Carl admitted was weak overall [...] More than anything, the album emphasized how confused we were about our brand."

== Influence and legacy ==
Carl and the Passions has since become a "cult favorite" among some fans. Elton John penned liner notes for the 2000 CD reissue, writing: 'This is an album which I have loved for a long time... Carl and the Passions: So Tough has moments of breathtaking genius and experimentation. When this record was released, I remember how different and fresh it sounded. It still does'. In 1993, the band Saint Etienne titled their album So Tough as an homage to the Beach Boys. Likewise, they also named their compilation of the same year, You Need a Mess of Help to Stand Alone, after the Beach Boys song.

== Track listing ==
Side one
No.	Title	Writer(s)	Lead vocals	Length
1.	"You Need a Mess of Help to Stand Alone"	Brian Wilson, Jack Rieley	Carl Wilson	3:27
2.	"Here She Comes"	Ricky Fataar, Blondie Chaplin	Ricky Fataar, Blondie Chaplin	5:10
3.	"He Come Down"	Al Jardine, B. Wilson, Mike Love	Mike Love with C. Wilson, B. Wilson & Chaplin	4:40
4.	"Marcella"	B. Wilson, Tandyn Almer, Rieley	C. Wilson with Chaplin and Love	3:54

Side two
No.	Title	Writer(s)	Lead vocals	Length
1.	"Hold On Dear Brother"	Fataar, Chaplin	Chaplin	4:43
2.	"Make It Good"	Dennis Wilson, Daryl Dragon	Dennis Wilson	2:36
3.	"All This Is That"	Jardine, Carl Wilson, Love	Al Jardine, Love, C. Wilson	4:00
4.	"Cuddle Up"	D. Wilson, Dragon	D. Wilson	5:30
Total length:				34:12

Track notes per 2000 liner notes.

== Personnel ==
Credits from Craig Slowinski, John Brode, Will Crerar and Joshilyn Hoisington. Track numbering refers to CD and digital releases of the album.

The Beach Boys

- Blondie Chaplin – lead (2, 4, 5), harmony (2, 4, 5), and backing vocals (3, 4, 5, 8); bass (3, 5, 7), electric (2), and acoustic guitars (2, 5), electric slide guitar (2); handclaps (3), finger snaps (3)
- Ricky Fataar – lead (2), harmony (2, 5), and backing vocals (5); drums (all tracks except 6 and 8), tambourine (1), cabasa (2, 7), castanets (4); Hammond organ (2)
- Al Jardine – lead (7), harmony (7), and backing vocals (1, 3–4); handclaps (3), finger snaps (3)
- Bruce Johnston – backing vocals (4)
- Mike Love – lead (3–4), harmony (7), and backing vocals (1, 3–4, 7); handclaps (3), finger snaps (3)
- Brian Wilson – backing (1, 3–4) and response vocals (3); tack piano (1), Hammond organ (1, 3–4), grand piano (3–4), Wurlitzer electric piano (4), Moog synthesizer (4); handclaps (3), finger snaps (3); vibraphone (4)
- Carl Wilson – lead (1, 4, 7), harmony (5, 7), backing (1, 3–5, 7), and response vocals (3); electric (1, 3–4), acoustic (4–5, 8), and bass guitars (2); Wurlitzer electric piano (7), Rocksichord (7), upright piano (7); handclaps (3), finger snaps (3)
- Dennis Wilson – lead (6, 8) and backing vocals (4, 6, 8), grand piano (6), Hammond organ (8), Moog synthesizer (6)

Touring members

- Daryl Dragon – grand piano (8); orchestral arrangements (6, 8)
- Billy Hinsche – backing vocals; electric (1) and acoustic guitars (5)
- Toni Tennille – backing vocals (8)

Guests

- Tandyn Almer – bass guitar (1), autoharps (4)
- Jack Rieley – backing vocals (4)

Additional session musicians

- Norman Botnick – viola (6, 8)
- David Burk – viola (6, 8)
- Frank Capp – timpani (6, 8)
- Barbara Carlson – French horn (6)
- Vincent DeRosa – French horn (6)
- Doug Dillard – banjo (1)
- Bonnie Douglas – violin (6, 8)
- Assa Drori – violin (6, 8)
- David Duke – French horn (6)
- Chuck Findley – trumpet (6)
- Irving Geller – violin (6, 8)
- Nathan Gershman – cello (6, 8)
- Jim Hughart – arco double bass (6, 8)
- Dick Hyde – bass trombone (6)
- George Hyde – French horn (6)
- JoAnn Johannsen – cello (6, 8)
- Jan Kelley – cello (6, 8)
- Richard F. Kelley Sr. – arco double bass (6, 8)
- Stephens LaFever – bass guitar (6, 8)
- Alfred Lustgarten – violin (6, 8)
- Leonard Malarsky – violin (6, 8)
- Gordon Marron – electric violin w/ ring modulator (1)
- Tony Martin Jr. – pedal steel guitars (4)
- Lew McCreary – trombone (6)
- Ollie Mitchell – trumpet (6)
- Joseph Reilich – viola (6, 8)
- Red Rhodes – pedal steel guitar (5)
- Jay Rosen – violin (6, 8)
- Nathan Ross – violin (6, 8)
- Meyer Rubin – arco double bass (6, 8)
- Sheldon Sanov – violin (6, 8)
- Victor Sazer – cello (6, 8)
- David Schwartz – viola (6, 8)
- Leonard Selic – violin (6, 8)
- Spiro Stamos – violin (6, 8)
- Dorothy Wade – violin (6, 8)
- Shari Zippert – violin (6, 8)
- Alex Del Zoppo – upright piano (2, 5)
- Unknown – sleigh bells (4), cabasa (4), bongos (4); 2 trumpets (4), trombone (4), bass trombone (4)

Technical

- The Beach Boys – producers
- Steve Moffitt – engineer
- Ed Thrasher – art direction
- Dave Willardson – cover art

== Charts ==
Chart positions for Carl and the Passions – "So Tough"
Chart (1972)	Position
UK Albums (Official Charts)	25
U.S. Billboard Top LPs & Tape	50

== Bibliography ==
- Badman, Keith (2004). The Beach Boys: The Definitive Diary of America's Greatest Band, on Stage and in the Studio. Backbeat Books. ISBN 978-0-87930-818-6.
- Carlin, Peter Ames (2006). Catch a Wave: The Rise, Fall, and Redemption of the Beach Boys' Brian Wilson. Rodale. ISBN 978-1-59486-320-2.
- Dillon, Mark (2012). Fifty Sides of the Beach Boys: The Songs That Tell Their Story. ECW Press. ISBN 978-1-77090-198-8.
- Doggett, Peter (1997a). "Hold On Dear Brother: The Beach Boys Without Brian Wilson". In Abbott, Kingsley (ed.). Back to the Beach: A Brian Wilson and the Beach Boys Reader (1st ed.). London: Helter Skelter. pp. 99–103. ISBN 978-1900924023.
- Doggett, Peter (1997b). "Holy Man and Slow Booze: Dennis Wilson". In Abbott, Kingsley (ed.). Back to the Beach: A Brian Wilson and the Beach Boys Reader. Helter Skelter. pp. 163–168. ISBN 978-1-90092-402-3.
- Gaines, Steven (1986). Heroes and Villains: The True Story of The Beach Boys. New York: Da Capo Press. ISBN 0306806479.
- Leaf, David (1978). The Beach Boys and the California Myth. New York: Grosset & Dunlap. ISBN 978-0-448-14626-3.
- Love, Mike (2016). Good Vibrations: My Life as a Beach Boy. Penguin Publishing Group. ISBN 978-0-698-40886-9.
- Stebbins, Jon (2000). Dennis Wilson: The Real Beach Boy. ECW Press. ISBN 978-1-55022-404-7.
- Tobler, John (1978). The Beach Boys. Chartwell Books. ISBN 0890091749.
- White, Timothy (1996). The Nearest Faraway Place: Brian Wilson, the Beach Boys, and the Southern Californian Experience. Macmillan. ISBN 0333649370.
