= Cryin' Heart Blues =

Compilation album by Rick Danko
- Released: 2005
- Label: Other Peoples Music

Rick Danko chronology
Times Like These (2000)	Cryin' Heart Blues (2005)	At Dylan's Cafe (2009)

Cryin' Heart Blues is a seventeen-track 2005 compilation of studio sessions and live recordings by Rick Danko, the late bassist of The Band. The album was taken from a wide variety of sources, dating from the sessions for Danko's eponymous first album through to other studio sessions recorded between about 1978 to 1988 and live recordings from 1979 and 1990.

== Recording history ==
In 1978, Rick Danko headed back into the studio with one-time Beach Boy Blondie Chaplin, Little Feat drummer Richie Hayward, one-time Clapton keyboardist Dick Simms and guitarist Johnny Lee Schell to record his follow-up for the label, producing five tracks, one by Danko, three by Chaplin and one a cover of an old Four Tops number. Further sessions with Simms, one-time Wings drummer Denny Seiwell and guitarists Jim Atkinson, Michael DeTemple and Keith Ellison came later in the year, producing three additional tracks, two by Danko (one co-authored by DeTemple) and a cover of the country standard "Cryin' Heart Blues". Before any of these recordings could be released, however, Danko was dropped from Arista.

Still, Danko persevered, and co-headlined concerts with Paul Butterfield in 1979. Four tracks from a concert in Los Angeles are included on the album, two pulled from Rick Danko, one a cover of The Band's "Unfaithful Servant" (originally from The Band), and the Sun Records classic "Mystery Train" (also covered by The Band on Moondog Matinee). Also featured on these recordings are Chaplin and Hayward.

An alternate cut of "New Mexicoe", featuring three guitar heavyweights (Eric Clapton, Pete Townshend and Ronnie Wood) dates from the sessions for Danko's eponymous debut. Lacking the subdued nature of the album version, it is one stage of a work-in-progress.

Three tracks featuring Tommy Spurlock are also featured, two dating from 1988 studio sessions ("Twilight" and "When I Get My Just Rewards") and the third a 1990 live recording (an acoustic version of "Mystery Train"). All featuring Spurlock on lap steel and backing vocal, the group on the studio cuts include, among others Danko's Band-mate Garth Hudson.

Vocals on all tracks are by Danko, except on "Cheatin' Heart" (demo) and "Don't Make Promises" (both Chaplin, with the vocals recorded especially for the project in 2005) and "Mystery Train" (electric version) (Danko and Butterfield).

== Track listing ==
1. "Mystery Train" (acoustic version) (Junior Parker, Sam Phillips) – 4:02
2. "Twilight"+ (Robbie Robertson) – 3:36
3. "When I Get My Just Rewards" (Paul Kennerly) – 3:31
4. "Lay Back" (Nicky Chinn, Mike Chapman) – 2:52
5. "I'll Turn To Stone" (R. Dean Taylor, Holland-Dozier-Holland) – 2:33
6. "Cry Another Tear" (Blondie Chaplin) – 3:17
7. "Cheatin' Heart" (demo) (Chaplin) – 3:50
8. "Cheatin' Heart" (Chaplin) – 3:12
9. "It's Alright, It's O.K." (Rick Danko, Michael DeTemple) – 3:34
10. "Don't Make Promises" (Chaplin) – 4:41
11. "Old Mexico"++ (Danko) – 4:03
12. "Cryin' Heart Blues" (Big Joe Turner) – 1:39
13. "New Mexicoe" (Danko, Bobby Charles) – 4:24
14. "Brainwash" (Danko, Emmett Grogan) – 3:53
15. "Java Blues" (Danko, Grogan) – 5:22
16. "Unfaithful Servant" (Robertson) – 4:53
17. "Mystery Train" (electric version) (Junior Parker, Sam Phillips) – 4:08
- + Despite the credit, Danko claimed co-authorship of "Twilight" at various times in his career.
- ++ Also credited with Bobby Charles as co-author.
- Track 1 is a live recording from 1990.
- Tracks 2 and 3 are studio recordings from 1988.
- Tracks 4, 5, 6, 7, 8 and 10 are studio recordings from early 1978. The vocals for tracks 7 and 10 were recorded by Blondie Chaplin in 2005.
- Tracks 9, 11 and 12 are studio recordings from mid-1978.
- Track 13 is a 1977 alternate take of a song from Rick Danko, and
- Tracks 14, 15, 16 and 17 are live recordings from 1979.

== Personnel ==
- Rick Danko – bass, acoustic guitar and lead vocal (all tracks)
- Jim Atkinson – guitar (9, 11)
- Paul Butterfield – harmonica and vocal (14–17)
- Blondie Chaplin – guitar, piano and vocal (4–8, 10, 14–17)
- Eric Clapton – guitar (13)
- Michael DeTemple – guitar (9, 11)
- Keith Ellison – guitar (9, 11)
- Jim Goodall – drums (3)
- Marty Grebb – piano (9, 11)
- Richie Hayward – drums (4–8, 10, 14–17)
- Garth Hudson – keyboards (2–3)
- Maud Hudson – backing vocals (3)
- Sneaky Pete Kleinow – pedal steel (2)
- Jerry Peterson – saxophone (9, 11)
- Johnny Lee Schell – guitar (4–8, 10)
- Denny Seiwell – drums (9, 11)
- Dick Simms – organ (4–11)
- Tommy Spurlock – lap steel and backing vocals (1–3)
- Pete Townshend – guitar (13)
- David Vaught – bass (2–3)
- Sredni Vollmer – harmonica (2–3)
- Ronnie Wood – guitar (13)
- A. N. Other – piano and drums (13)
