= Times Like These (Rick Danko album) =

Compilation album by Rick Danko
- Released: 2000
- Genre: Folk rock
- Producer: Aaron Professor Louie Hurwitz, Jim Tullio

Rick Danko chronology
Live on Breeze Hill (1999)	Times Like These (2000)	Cryin' Heart Blues (2005)

Times Like These was Band bassist Rick Danko's final album, a posthumous release featuring tracks from a variety of sources dating from an aborted solo project in 1993 to Danko's final live performance in Ann Arbor, Michigan just days before his death.

Those tracks recorded specifically for the project were the title track (a song Danko had written in the 1970s but had yet to find a place for), "Ripple" (suggested by the President of Breeze Hill Records, who issued the album), "All Our Past Times" (in keeping with Danko's revisiting of a song from his younger days), "This Wheel's on Fire" (a second, unfinished, revisit, it features an entirely redone arrangement by The Crowmatix and Garth Hudson), "You Can Go Home" and "People of Conscience" (both written by Tom Pacheco, the former co-written by Danko, and focusing on human rights). Of the remaining four, "Book Faded Brown" and "Let the Four Winds Blow"- the latter sung by Danko cohort Aaron Hurwitz- date from Danko's last live show on December 6, 1999, both featuring posthumous overdubbing by Hurwitz and others. "Chain Gang" dated from the sessions for The Band's High on the Hog album and featured all of the late-period members of The Band except Levon Helm and "Change Is Good" featuring Joe Walsh dated from an aborted 1993 solo project for Elektra Records.

== Track listing ==
1. "Times Like These" (Danko) – 4:19
2. "Ripple" (Jerry Garcia, Robert Hunter) – 5:41
3. "All Our Past Times" (Danko, Eric Clapton) – 3:46
4. "Book Faded Brown" (Paul Jost) – 3:12
5. "Chain Gang" (Sam Cooke) – 4:10
6. "Change Is Good" (Danko, Jim Tullio, Ed Kaercher) – 4:10
7. "Sip the Wine" (Tim Drummond) – 5:19
8. "This Wheel's on Fire" (Danko, Bob Dylan) – 5:06
9. "You Can Go Home" (Danko, Tom Pacheco) – 5:34
10. "Let the Four Winds Blow" (Dave Bartholomew, Antoine "Fats" Domino) – 3:22
11. "People of Conscience" (Pacheco) – 4:10

== Personnel ==
- Richard Bell – synthesizers
- Gary Burke – drums
- Chris "Hambone" Cameron – Hammond organ
- Randy Ciarlante – drums, lead & backing vocals
- Rick Danko – bass, acoustic guitar, lead & backing vocals
- Terry Danko – bass
- Mike DeMicco – acoustic guitar, mandolin
- Mike Dunn – bass
- Jim Eppard – acoustic guitar, lap steel guitar, mandolin
- Hank Guaglianoe – drums
- Levon Helm – harmonica, mandolin
- Garth Hudson – accordion, keyboards, alto & soprano & tenor saxophones, synthesizer
- Maud Hudson – backing vocals
- Prof. Aaron "Louie" Hurwitz – accordion, bass, Hammond organ, piano, synthesizer, lead & backing vocals
- Bashiri Johnson – percussion
- Dennis Johnson – bass
- Tom Malone – baritone horn, trombone, tuba
- Greg Marsh – percussion
- Tom Pacheco – acoustic guitar
- Larry Packer – viola
- Scott Petito – bass
- Bill Ruppert – guitar
- Dean Sharp – drums
- Beth Reineke – backing vocals
- Leslie Ritter – backing vocals
- Marie Spinosa – percussion, backing vocals
- Jim Tullio – guitar, backing vocals
- Sredni Vollner – harmonica
- Joe Walsh – guitar, piano, backing vocals
- Jim Weider – dobro, acoustic & electric guitar, mandolin
- Eric Weissberg – banjo, acoustic guitar
