= Purple Gang (disambiguation) =

The Purple Gang were Jewish American bootleggers and hijackers in Detroit during the 1920s.

Purple Gang may also refer to:

- East Harlem Purple Gang, Italian American gang of drug dealers and hitmen
- The Purple Gang (film), a 1960 American crime film
- The Purple Gang (American band), a 1960s garage/psychedelic band
- The Purple Gang (British band), British rock band active intermittently since the 1960s
- Purple People Eaters, defensive line of the Minnesota Vikings from the late 1960s to the late 1970s
