= You Need a Mess of Help to Stand Alone (song) =

Single by the Beach Boys

from the album Carl and the Passions – "So Tough"
- B-side: "Cuddle Up"
- Released: May 15, 1972
- Recorded: 1972
- Genre: Rock
- Length: 3:27
- Label: Brother/Reprise
- Songwriters: Brian Wilson, Jack Rieley
- Producer: The Beach Boys

The Beach Boys singles chronology
"Surf's Up" (1971)	"You Need a Mess of Help to Stand Alone" (1972)	"Marcella" (1972)

Licensed audio
- "You Need a Mess of Help to Stand Alone" on YouTube

"You Need a Mess of Help to Stand Alone" is a song by American rock band the Beach Boys from their 1972 album Carl and the Passions – "So Tough". It was written by Brian Wilson and Jack Rieley, and was issued as the album's lead single with the B-side "Cuddle Up". The single failed to chart.

== Background ==
An earlier, unreleased version of the song was titled "Beatrice from Baltimore".

Asked about the song in 1972, Mike Love commented, "I like the track, it's one that requires a few plays to get into it. A point about a lot of Brian's things is that they are so oblique and often complex. His music is something that you have to listen to, because he'll put in subtleties that you can listen to for a year and not hear."

Record World said "The sound here is a bit confusing the first time around, but after a few listenings it becomes clear what's going on: another superfiine Beach Boys song."

== Alternate releases ==
A track and backing vocals mix of "You Need a Mess of Help to Stand Alone" was included on the 2021 box set Feel Flows as a teaser for the band's next archival release, Sail On Sailor – 1972 (2022).

== Legacy ==
- In 1993, Saint Etienne adopted the song title for their album You Need a Mess of Help to Stand Alone.
- In 1999, Hefner released a cover of "You Need a Mess of Help to Stand Alone" as a bonus track to their single "The Hymn for the Cigarettes".

== Personnel ==
Credits from Craig Slowinski, John Brode, Will Crerar and Joshilyn Hoisington.

The Beach Boys

- Ricky Fataar - drums, tambourine
- Al Jardine - backing vocals
- Mike Love - backing vocals
- Brian Wilson - backing vocals, tack piano, Hammond organ, producer
- Carl Wilson - lead and backing vocals, electric lead and rhythm guitars, producer

Additional musicians

- Tandyn Almer - bass guitar
- Doug Dillard - banjo
- Billy Hinsche - electric rhythm guitar
- Gordon Marron - electric violin w/ ring modulator
