= Rick Danko (album) =

Studio album by Rick Danko
- Released: 1977
- Genre: Rock
- Length: 32:20
- Label: Arista
- Producer: Rick Danko, Rob Fraboni

Rick Danko chronology
Rick Danko (1977)	Danko/Fjeld/Andersen (1991)

Professional ratings
Review scores
Source	Rating
Allmusic	3/5 stars
Christgau's Record Guide	B
The Philadelphia Inquirer	4/4 stars

Rick Danko is the 1977 debut by the bassist and singer for the Band. Featuring ten tracks mainly (but not completely; see "Sip the Wine" below) written by Danko, mostly in conjunction with lyricists Bobby Charles and Emmett Grogan, it was the first solo album by any member of the group and was Danko's only solo studio album; the other two albums he released in his lifetime were solo live recordings and collaborative studio albums.

Rick Danko is the only solo album by a member of the Band to feature each member of the group, with Garth Hudson playing accordion on "New Mexicoe", Robbie Robertson playing lead guitar on "Java Blues", Richard Manuel playing electric piano on "Shake It", and Levon Helm singing harmony vocal on the closing track "Once Upon a Time". Danko handled lead vocals, bass, and guitar. Other guests included Eric Clapton (guitar on "New Mexicoe"), Ronnie Wood (guitar on "What a Town"), Beach Boy and later Band member Blondie Chaplin (guitar and bass on various tracks) and Doug Sahm (guitar on various tracks).

== Sip the Wine ==
Although some versions of the album credit the song to Rick Danko, the album's fifth song, "Sip the Wine", is in fact a cover of Tim Drummond's 1971 song "To Lay Down Beside You", originally recorded by Joe Simon. Tim Drummond plays bass on a number of albums on which the song appears, including Rick Danko (although not on track "Sip the Wine").

== Track listing ==
1. "What a Town" (Danko, Bobby Charles)
2. "Brainwash" (Danko, Emmett Grogan)
3. "New Mexicoe" (Danko, Charles)
4. "Tired of Waiting" (Danko, Jim Atkinson)
5. "Sip the Wine" (Tim Drummond, originally titled "I Want to Lay Down Beside You")
6. "Java Blues" (Danko, Grogan)
7. "Sweet Romance" (Danko, Grogan)
8. "Small Town Talk" (Danko, Charles)
9. "Shake It" (Danko)
10. "Once Upon a Time" (Danko, Grogan)

== Personnel ==
=== Main players ===
- Rick Danko – bass, rhythm and lead guitars and lead vocal
- Michael DeTemple, Doug Sahm, and James Atkinson – guitars
- Walt Richmond – piano
- James Gordon – organ
- Denny Seiwell and Terry Danko – drums
- Gerry Beckley, Blondie Chaplin, Rob Fraboni, and Wayne Neuendorf – backing vocals
- Lewis Bustos, Jim Gordon, Charles McBurney, Rocky Morales and Jim Price – horn section
  - Horns arranged by Rick Danko, Doug Sahm and Rob Fraboni

=== Guests ===
- Ronnie Wood – guitar solo on "What a Town"
- Blondie Chaplin – guitar solo on "Brainwash", bass on "Small Town Talk"
- Tim Drummond – bass on "Brainwash" and "Java Blues"
- Eric Clapton – guitar on "New Mexicoe"
- Rob Fraboni – tambourine on "New Mexicoe" and "Shake It", vibraslap on "Tired of Waiting"
- Garth Hudson – accordion on "New Mexicoe"
- Joe Lala – percussion on "Tired of Waiting"
- Ken Lauber – piano on "Tired of Waiting", "Sweet Romance", and "Once Upon a Time"
- Robbie Robertson – guitar solo on "Java Blues"
- George Weber – organ on "Sweet Romance" and "Once Upon a Time"
- Gerry Beckley – acoustic guitar on "Shake It"
- Richard Manuel – Fender Rhodes piano on "Shake It"
- David Paich – Moog synthesizer on "Shake It"
- Levon Helm – harmony vocal on "Once Upon a Time"

Technical

- Produced by Rick Danko and Rob Fraboni
- Frank Laffitte – cover photography

== Charts ==
=== Weekly charts ===
Album
Chart (1978)	Peak position
US Billboard 200	119
