= Cuddle Up =

- Dutch release picture sleeve

Single by The Beach Boys

from the album Carl and the Passions – "So Tough"
- A-side: "You Need a Mess of Help to Stand Alone"
- Released: May 15, 1972
- Recorded: April 9, 1972
- Studio: Beach Boys Studio, Los Angeles
- Length: 5:30 (album); 5:20 (single)
- Label: Brother/Reprise
- Songwriters: Dennis Wilson, Daryl Dragon
- Producer: The Beach Boys

The Beach Boys singles chronology
"Surf's Up" (1971)	"Cuddle Up" (1972)	"Marcella" (1972)

"Cuddle Up" is a song by American rock band the Beach Boys that was written by Dennis Wilson and Daryl Dragon. It was concurrently released in two formats on May 15, 1972. One version was released on the album Carl and the Passions – "So Tough", and another as the b-side to "You Need a Mess of Help to Stand Alone".

== Recording ==
Following the release of the Beach Boys album Surf's Up in August 1971, Dennis Wilson collaborated with Daryl Dragon, intending to record a solo album. Cuddle Up was initially recorded for this project in late 1971 under the working title Old Movie.

After the idea for producing this solo album was abandoned, Dennis re-recorded "Cuddle Up" at his brother Brian's home studio in Bel Air, California on May 15, 1972 for the Beach Boys.

The lead vocal on Cuddle Up is performed by Dennis and production is credited to the Beach Boys.

A slightly different mix of Cuddle Up was pressed on the b-side to "You Need a Mess of Help to Stand Alone". It features alternate mixing, additional string overdubs and backing vocals.

== Reception ==
Matthew Greenwald of Allmusic stated ""Cuddle Up" is a somewhat top-heavy, classically influenced ballad. However, the lyrics and Dennis Wilson's excellent vocals render this an emotional masterpiece, closing the album out with style" and noted that it is essential listening for those exploring Dennis Wilson's talents.

== Personnel ==
Credits from Craig Slowinski, John Brode, Will Crerar and Joshilyn Hoisington

The Beach Boys

- Blondie Chaplin – backing vocals
- Carl Wilson – backing vocals, acoustic guitar
- Dennis Wilson – lead and backing vocals, Hammond organ, producer

Additional musicians

- Frank Capp – timpani
- Daryl Dragon – grand piano, co-arrangement, orchestra producer
- Stephens LaFever – bass guitar
- Toni Tennille – backing vocals
- Bonnie Douglas, Assa Drori, Irving Geller, Alfred Lustgarten, Leonard Malarsky, Jay Rosen, Nathan Ross, Sheldon Sanov, Leonard Selic, Spiro Stamos, Dorothy Wade, Shari Zippert – violins
- Norman Botnick, David Burk, Joseph Reilich, David Schwartz – violas
- JoAnn Johannsen, Jan Kelley, Nathan Gershman, Victor Sazer – cellos
- James D. Hughart, Richard F. Kelley Sr., Meyer Rubin – double basses

== Cover versions ==
- 1975 – Captain & Tennille, Love Will Keep Us Together
- 1976 – Bobby Goldsboro, A Butterfly For Bucky
