= All This Is That =

1972 song by the Beach Boys

Song by the Beach Boys

from the album Carl and the Passions – "So Tough"
- Released: May 15, 1972
- Recorded: December 1971 – c. April 1972
- Studio: Beach Boys Studio, Los Angeles, California
- Genre: Rock · pop · R&B
- Length: 4:00
- Label: Brother/Reprise
- Songwriters: Al Jardine, Carl Wilson, Mike Love
- Producers: Al Jardine, Carl Wilson

Music video
- "All This Is That" on YouTube

"All This Is That" is a song by American rock band the Beach Boys from their 1972 album Carl and the Passions – "So Tough". Written by Al Jardine, Carl Wilson, and Mike Love, the song was inspired by Maharishi Mahesh Yogi's Transcendental Meditation teachings and the Robert Frost poem "The Road Not Taken".

== Background ==
Asked about the song in a 2013 interview, Al Jardine gave the following explanation:

That was inspired by a Robert Frost poem "The Road Not Taken." It’s a real moving poem about choices, taking gambles rather than going the safe route. Someone turned me onto that poem so I went up on a little road in Big Sur right above my house by the Big Sur River, read it and I really got inspired. Then a lecture by Maharishi infused in me the wisdom of the ancient Veda scriptures, in particular the saying that we are all one.

He put it in the term of the Vedas meaning, “I am that, thou is that, all this is that.” I thought it was amusing at first and then realized how profound it was in its simplicity. It’s pretty amazing when you think about it. I thought, ‘What a great chorus that would make.”

Carl really took it to heart and added his own vibration to it at the end with that beautiful, soaring melodic mantra that he sings at the end. Unfortunately, not a lot of people heard the song because it wasn’t the kind of vehicle the Beach Boys are known for.

Mike Love said in a 1972 interview,

Alan and I were in New York for 2 1/2 months studying with the Maharishi and during that time we made a few songs, two of which are on this album. One is called 'All This Is That' which is a line from a basic tenet of Hindu or Buddah which says: "I am that; Thou are that; All this is that". It's a philosophical expression, which relates to universal creative intelligence from which everything is made up. It is the basis of all life. That philosophy is the background of the whole song, the lyrics are kind of illustrative of a mood or feeling of when a person meditates and takes a dive within the mind. The song is philosophical through the lyrics and creating a mood through the music. It creates a feeling which is born of our being involved with meditation. It has a very pretty feeling.

== Critical reception ==
In his 1978 biography of the Beach Boys, John Tobler wrote that it was unlikely that "All This Is That" (along with the album track "He Come Down") would "figure in anyone's favorite 20 Beach Boys tracks."

Reviewing the band's albums from 1966 to 1973, Record Collector's Jamie Atkins said that "All This Is That" was perhaps "one of the group's greatest achievements without Brian; a fantastically calming song with some of the finest vocal interplay of this period married to an airy melody that perfectly suited the by-now-perennial subject matter of transcendental meditation. And the note that Carl hits on the 'Jai guru dev' lyric has mood-altering qualities that, if it were possible to bottle it, would do wonders if available on prescription."

== Personnel ==
Credits from Craig Slowinski, John Brode, Will Crerar and Joshilyn Hoisington

The Beach Boys

- Blondie Chaplin - bass guitar
- Ricky Fataar - drums w/ brushes, cabasa
- Al Jardine - lead and backing vocals, producer
- Mike Love - backing vocals
- Carl Wilson - lead and backing vocals, upright piano, Wurlitzer electric piano, Rocksichord, producer
