= Bill Ruppert =

American guitarist

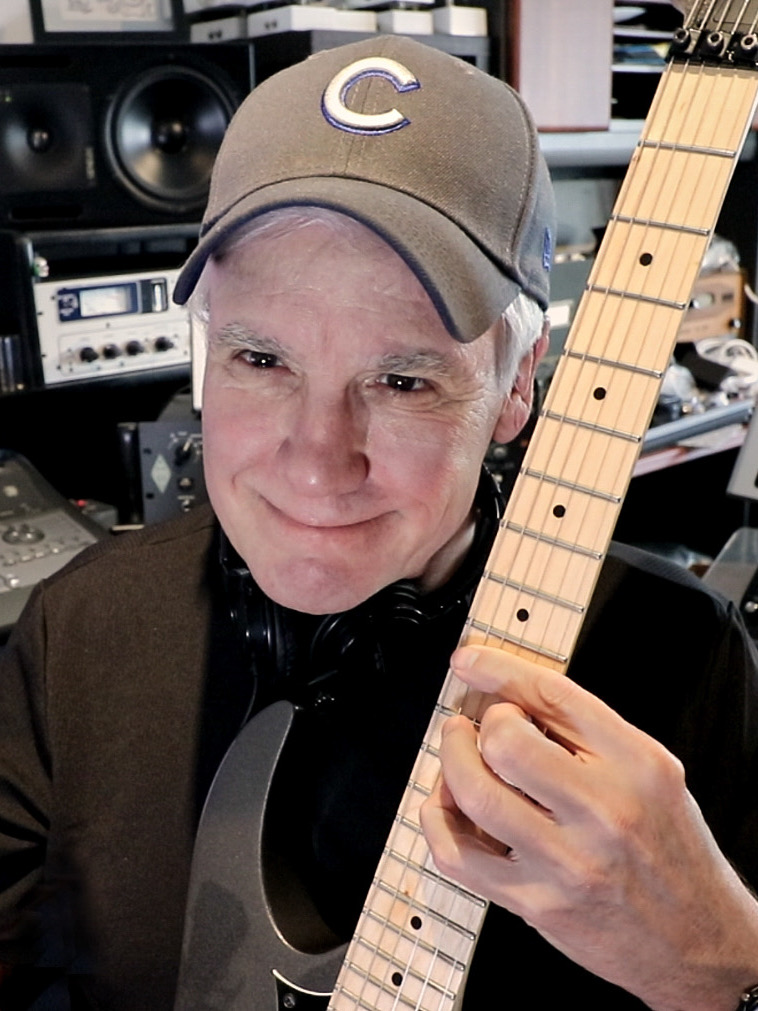
- Bill Ruppert, American guitarist

Background information
- Born: Chicago, Illinois
- Occupation: Session Musician
- Instrument: Guitar
- Years active: 1980s–present

Bill Ruppert (born June 10, 1954) is an American musician, known as one of the most prolific and widely heard studio guitarists, logging nearly 8,000 sessions in a career spanning over 30 years.

As a first-call studio guitarist and session musician, Ruppert has worked with a roster of top artist and commercial clients since the 1980s. He recorded guitar with Bryan Ferry of Roxy Music, Phil Collins of Genesis, Maurice White of Earth, Wind & Fire, Chuck Mangione and Richie Havens. In conjunction with Electro-Harmonix, he has created a series of Effectology videos using effects pedals to imitate different instruments, recreate classic songs, and mimic real-life sounds. Working with Electro-Harmonix, Ruppert was one of the principal designers of the B9/C9 organ machines as well as the Key9 electric piano machine, Mel9 Mellotron emulator, Synth9 synth machine, Bass9 bass machine and String9 String Ensemble. Ruppert has also worked with the Kemper profiling amplifier company as a consultant and sound designer.

== Life and career ==
Ruppert was born in Chicago, Illinois, to Frances and Clyde Ruppert. Clyde Ruppert was a saxophonist who played in the Glenn Miller division of the Air Force Band during WWII and later touring the world with Guy Lombardo Orchestra and other popular big bands. Ruppert's grandfather played drums with a young Benny Goodman during Goodman's early years in Chicago.

Growing up in a musical family, Ruppert focused his goals in that direction. After graduating from college, Bill taught guitar/music in grammar school and college. By 1986, he was the first-call guitarist in the Chicago commercial studio scene.

== Awards ==
Ruppert won a Clio Award in 1989 for his advertising music production role in the Durasoft Color Contacts commercial "Parachute" for Young & Rubicam, Chicago.

== Effectology ==
In 2009, Ruppert began creating a video series called Effectology, in which he recreated extraordinary sounds with a regular electric guitar and Electro-Harmonix gear. Topics ranging from inventing Halloween sounds to re-creating Kraftwerk's 'Autobahn' to generating Caribbean steel drum effects are covered. Ruppert is currently working with the design team at Electro-Harmonix creating new effects for electric guitar.

== Selected discography ==
Ruppert played on hundreds of commercially released recordings and soundtracks. These lists represent only a small fraction of his recorded performances.

=== Album credits on guitar ===
- Made in California (The Beach Boys, 2013)
- Black Robes and Lawyers (William Michael Dillon, 2011)
- Johnny Boy Would Love This: A Tribute to John Martyn (Various Artists, 2011)
- If Only... (Howard Hewett, 2007)
- Squur Dance (B-Cow, 2007)
- Hurricane Season (Shanna Zell, 2005)
- Have a Little Faith (Mavis Staples, 2004)
- Rough Grooves Surface (Tree Thirteen, 2004)
- Change Is Good (Lonie Walker, 2002)
- Couldn't Love You No More/No Little Boy (John Martyn, 2000)
- Times Like These (Rick Danko, 2000)
- Stars and Stripes, Vol. 1 (The Beach Boys, 1996)
- No Big Surprise: Anthology (Steve Goodman, 1994)
- No Little Boy (John Martyn, 1993)
- Boomchild (Dennis DeYoung, 1988)
- Keys to the City (Ramsey Lewis, 1987)
- Simple Things (Richie Havens, 1987)
- Unfinished Business (Steve Goodman, 1987)
- Bête Noire (Bryan Ferry, 1987)
- Save Tonight for Me (Chuck Mangione, 1986)
- Robin Angel (Robin Angel, 1986)
- You Love Looks Good on Me (Gene Chandler, 1985)
- Marbles (Software, 1981)

== Television shows (partial list) ==
Miami Vice (Pilot)	Kristin with Kristin Chenoweth
Late Line with Al Franken	Dempsey Makepeace (USA)
180 North (ABC)	WTTW promos (Chicago PBS)
CBS News	WGN News

== Television and radio commercials (partial list) ==
Ruppert played on thousands of television and radio commercials. These lists represent only a small fraction of his recorded performances. The full list of credits is on record with the Chicago Federation of Musicians.

Sears	Montgomery Ward	JC Penney
Carson Pirie Scott	McDonald's	Pizza Hut
Hardee's	Ford Motors	Chevrolet
Hyundai	Mazda	Pontiac
Chrysler	Oldsmobile	Coke
Pepsi	Dell Computer	7-up
Nokia	John Deere	Hallmark
Cellular One	Exxon Mobile	Oscar Mayer
Chef Boyardee	Nestle	SC Johnson & Sons
Keebler	Kellogg's	Red Lobster
Fannie Mae	Applebee's	TGI Friday's
White Castle	Popeyes Chicken	State Farm
BP Amoco	Alberto Culver	Fox Sports
Toys R Us	Allstate	Anheuser Busch
Coors	Micheloeb	Budweiser
Leinenkugel	Long John Silver	Bob Evans
Sony	Bayer	Procter & Gamble
Dove Soap	Kraft Foods	Blue Cross Blue Shield
Tombstone Pizza	Verizon	Wrigley
Gerber Foods	Polaroid	Kentucky Fried Chicken
Walt Disney	Country Insurance	Norelco
Aveeno	Wisconsin Lotto	Illinois Lottery
Mrs. Dash	Ace Hardware	Florida Dept. of Citrus
Carrier	Nationwide	Suave
Tropicana	Midas Muffler	Car-X
Big Lots	United Airlines	Southwest Airlines
Scrubbing Bubbles	Juicy Fruit	7-Eleven
Jimmy Dean Foods	Subway	Corona Beer
Jim Beam	Dodge	DiGiorno
Thera Flu	Dairy Board	Boeing
Bird's Eye	OfficeMax	US Post Office
Celebrex	Kimberly-Clark	Phillp Morris
Bisquick	Sara Lee	Six Flags
Barilla Pasta	Nabisco	US Army
Minute Maid	TWA	Shout
Morgan Stanley	Carnival Cruise	ATA
Gatorade	Mead	Skittles
Dollar Rent-a-Car	Rent-a-Center	Sam's Club
Aleve	Orange Crush	Glade Plug-Ins
Hamburger Helper	Clark Gasoline	Yellow Freight
Bob Evans	Barbie	GI Joe
Hershey Foods	Sargento Foods	Subaru
Fantastik	Busch Gardens	Paramount Pictures
Betty Crocker	Harrah's Casino	Wheaties
Buick	Boca	American Airlines
Pert Plus	Land's End	Cheeze-Its
Kawasaki	Jiffy Lube	Oscar Mayer
Off	ABC Television	CBS Television
PBS	Zip-Loc	Emerson Electronics
Craftsman	Cap'n Crunch	American Medical Assn.
Rotor-Rooter	ESPN	Pillsbury
Mr. Clean	Old El Paso	Luvs
Ace Hardware	Cool Whip	Payless
Motor Sports	Honda	Rent A Center
Nexium	McDonald's	White Castle
Ford	GE	LaQuinta
Humana	SC Johnson	CiCi's Pizza
Downey	Budweiser	Samsung
Old Style Beer	Auto Zone	Oldsmobile
Citgo	Domino's Pizza	Bow Flex
Case-IH	Chicago Bulls	Ore-Ida
Electro-Harmonix	Kemper Amplifiers	Mars Candy
Ministar Guitars	Dial	Kohler
Levi's	Durasoft	Lowenbrau
Milton Bradley	Busch Beer	Chili's
Jewel Foods	Toyota	Illinois Tourism
Kellogg's	Firestone	Tampax
Tombstone Pizza	Keebler	Celestial Seasonings
Chicago Fire (soccer)	Weber	Cadillac
Huffy	Cheetos	John Madden Football
Leo Burnett	Frosted Flakes	Gatorade
Secret	Starkist	Sunkist
Wrigley	Georgia Power	Glade
Hardee's	K-Mart	Raid
La-Z-Boy	Sara Lee	Payless
Chicago Field Museum	Arbonne	Mattel
Friendly's	Febreze	Frito-Lay

== Personal life ==
Ruppert married Joan Tortorici, television writer/producer, in 1977.
