= Michael DeTemple =

American musician (born 1947)

Michael DeTemple (born December 15, 1947) is an American musician and luthier known for his handmade solid-body guitars.

Born and raised in Los Angeles, California, DeTemple began repairing and maintaining a wide range of stringed instruments at the age of 13. Early on, he became acquainted with renowned guitarist Ernie Ball, who retained his services by paying with old guitars.

== Musician ==
He began playing banjo, guitar, and mandolin at 12, quickly achieving a high level of proficiency. He began hanging out at the Ash Grove folk club in Los Angeles, where he came into contact with a number of luminaries in the folk and blues genres including Taj Mahal, Doc Watson, Lightnin' Hopkins, Clarence White, and Jesse Ed Davis. At 14, he won his first Topanga Canyon Banjo and Fiddle Contest, winning three more times by eighteen. In 1966, Academy Award winning composer, Earl Robinson invited him to play in the "Winterfest Concerto for Five String Banjo and Orchestra" with the Los Angeles Philharmonic conducted by Lawrence Foster and later with Elmer Bernstein. In the 1970s, DeTemple worked as a studio musician, and contributed to a number of film scores and other projects. A notable studio performance during this period was on Dave Mason's bestselling album, Alone Together. He also developed a close friendship with the Band bass player, Rick Danko with whom he recorded, later playing live in the Rick Danko Band. Danko discovered his guitar work when DeTemple joined in on a jam session in the studio with Eric Clapton, Pete Townshend, and Ron Wood. Most recently he has played mandolin on John Fogerty’s DeJa Vu All Over Again and the supplemental disc of Kevin Costner's Open Range DVD Beyond Open Range: (The Making of Open Range).

== Guitar maker ==
In 1995, he founded DeTemple Guitars and began building handmade Stratocaster- and Telecaster-style solid body guitars using original 1950s vintage instruments as templates. His guitars are highly sought after by collectors and professional musicians. Master luthier Rick Turner, has referred to his guitars as "...the one out of 5,000 — the top half of one percent of all these types of guitars... the dream Strat-style guitars that everybody’s chasing after." He claims to have made guitars for Bob Dylan, John Fogerty and some known Jazz musicians. DeTemple is said to employ the "esoteric" centuries-old method of tap-tuning the woods he uses in his creations, although it is unclear whether or not the process is effective for non-acoustic instruments. He also uses "30,000 year-old fossilized Mastodon ivory tusk" nuts, his own pickups, bridges, blocks and other hardware. His guitars sell in mid-to-upper-four-figure range. There has been up to a three-year wait list. There is currently less than a one-year wait list. He lives in the San Fernando Valley area of Los Angeles, California.
