= Marcella (song) =

Single by the Beach Boys

from the album Carl and the Passions – "So Tough"
- B-side: "Hold On Dear Brother"
- Released: June 26, 1972
- Recorded: February 17, 1972
- Genre: Rock · Pop
- Length: 3:54
- Label: Brother/Reprise
- Songwriters: Brian Wilson, Tandyn Almer, Jack Rieley
- Producer: The Beach Boys

The Beach Boys singles chronology
"You Need a Mess of Help to Stand Alone" (1972)	"Marcella" (1972)	"Sail On, Sailor" (1973)

Licensed audio
- "Marcella" on YouTube

"Marcella" is a song by the American rock band the Beach Boys from their 1972 album Carl and the Passions – "So Tough". Written by Brian Wilson, Jack Rieley, and Tandyn Almer, the lyrics were inspired by Wilson's fixation with a local massage therapist. It is the last song to feature Bruce Johnston during his original tenure in the band.

== Background ==
The verse melody of "Marcella" branched from an earlier track entitled "I Just Got My Pay" (recorded during sessions for Sunflower) which itself branched from another discarded song called "All Dressed Up for School". I Just Got My Pay was released on the 1993 box set Good Vibrations: Thirty Years of The Beach Boys.

"Marcella" was written about a real woman that Wilson knew. Music journalist Nick Kent explains that she "worked at a parlour just off the strip called Circus Maximus" and had allowed Wilson to "stay and talk to her even though she was aware most of what he said was crazy bullshit." According to Jack Rieley:

About that time Brian began talking in detail about a massage parlour in West Hollywood and one of the girls who worked there. At first he spoke only of going there for massages. Some days later he began going on and on about the masseuse who he said was turning him on.… The only thing I could think of to quell Brian's fixation was to channel it. Thus it was I who suggested Marcella as the title for a tune Brian had been working on. With my promise to write the Marcella lyric, he jumped into the project with immense enthusiasm. Brian, Carl, Desper and I worked hard on that record. Dennis helped too. The zither was a cool idea but it was mixed poorly. My lyric was minor... efficient at best.

Wilson later said that one of the lead guitar parts was inspired by George Harrison's playing, namely, Harrison's solo on "Let It Be" (1970). On another occasion, Wilson said that the song "represents one of the first times we tried to emulate The Rolling Stones. In my mind, it was dedicated to the Stones, but I never told them that. It's one of the rockingest songs I ever wrote."

== Recording ==
"Marcella" was recorded on February 17, 1972 during the same session for "Out in the Country" and "Body Talk" at the Beach Boys' Bel Air studio.

== Release ==
"Marcella" (backed with "Hold On Dear Brother") was released on June 26, 1972 as the album's second single. It peaked at No. 110 on the Billboard Bubbling Under Hot 100 Singles chart, No. 116 on the Cashbox singles chart and No. 129 on the Record World singles chart.

Record World said it "is the Beach Boys at their very best."

== Personnel ==
Credits from Craig Slowinski, John Brode, Will Crerar and Joshilyn Hoisington.

The Beach Boys

- Blondie Chaplin - lead and backing vocals
- Ricky Fataar – drums, castanets
- Al Jardine – backing vocals
- Bruce Johnston – backing vocals
- Mike Love – lead and backing vocals
- Brian Wilson – backing vocals, grand piano, Wurlitzer electric piano, Hammond organ, Moog synthesizer (bass), vibraphone
- Carl Wilson – lead and backing vocals, electric and acoustic guitars, producer
- Dennis Wilson – backing vocals

Additional musicians

- Tandyn Almer – autoharps
- Tony Martin Jr. – pedal steel guitars
- Jack Rieley – backing vocals
- unidentified players – 2 trumpets, trombone, bass trombone, sleigh bells, cabasa, bongos
