= The Flame (The Flames album) =

Studio album by The Flames
- Released: 1970
- Recorded: 1970
- Genre: Power pop; hard rock
- Length: 38:30
- Label: Brother
- Producer: Carl Wilson

The Flames chronology
Soulfire!! (1968)	The Flame (1970)

The Flame is a 1970 album released by South African band the Flames produced by Beach Boys member Carl Wilson. It is the only non-Beach Boys album to be released on their Brother Records label—albeit distributed by Starday-King Records as opposed to Reprise. To avoid confusion with James Brown's band of the same name, the "s" on the Flames was dropped, but it was retained on South African pressings. Unlike previous Flames albums, which contain covers, all eleven tracks are originals written by the band.

The album was released on CD by the UK Fallout label in 2006. The album was re-released in 2011 under the name Psychedelic Essentials with a slightly different track order.

== Track listing ==
As per label, all songs written by Fataar/Chaplin/Fataar/Fataar.

1. "See the Light" – 3:06
2. "Make It Easy" – 3:06
3. "Hey Lord" – 3:49
4. "Lady" – 3:28
5. "Don't Worry, Bill" – 3:17
6. "Get Your Mind Made Up" – 4:10
7. "Highs and Lows" – 4:49
8. "I'm So Happy" – 3:17
9. "Dove" – 2:18
10. "Another Day Like Heaven" – 5:42
11. "See the Light (Reprise)" – 1:28

== Personnel ==
- Blondie Chaplin – guitar, vocals
- Ricky Fataar – drums, vocals
- Steve Fataar – guitar, vocals
- Brother Fataar – bass, vocals
- Steve Desper – engineer
- Robert Jenkins – art direction, photography
- Carl Wilson – producer
