= The Purple Gang (American band) =

American rock band

Background information
- Origin: Los Angeles, California, United States
- Genres: Garage rock; psychedelic rock
- Years active: 1965-1967
- Labels: Jerden, MGM
- Past members: Bob Corff; Alan Wisdom; Mark Landon; Marty Tryon; Harry Garfield; Tom Atwater

The Purple Gang was an American rock band from Los Angeles, California who were active from 1965 to 1967. They recorded a handful of singles for the MGM label, of which "Bring Your Own Self Down," composed by Tandyn Almer, is the best-known. Their work has appeared on compilations such as Just for Kicks Volume 1, which was issued by Misty Lane Records in 2004.

== History ==
The Purple Gang formed in North Hollywood in late 1965 with a membership composed primarily of students from North Hollywood High School. The band chose their name based on the infamous Chicago gang of the same name. According to former member Marty Tryon, "I am pretty sure the name The Purple Gang came from Rosemary Richland. She told us about the gangsters in Detroit that were called the Purple Gang during the 1930s. They got us purple shirts with puffy sleeves and away we went." Their original lineup consisted of Bob Corff (vocals), Alan Wisdom (guitar), Mark Landon (guitar), Marty Tryon (bass), Harry Garfield (keyboards), and Tom Atwater (drums) and their sound was influenced by bands such as the Beatles, the Byrds, and Love. The band's lead singer, Bob Corff, knew L.A. music promoter Tony Richland, who became the band's manager, and would later be associated with Harry Nilsson. Wisdom and Tryon had played in another local band, the Tegrams. They made their first live appearance playing in front of a gas station, an event which, according to popular legend, prompted drummer Atwater to coin the phrase "What a gas!"

In performance each member of the band would wear one purple glove, an idea which guitarist Landon subsequently brought along when he left the Purple gang and joined the Music Machine, led by Sean Bonniwell, who scored a huge hit in 1966 with "Talk Talk, and whose members would each wear one black glove. Bass player Tryon claims to have originally come up with the idea:

I was the one that started the glove idea. I got the idea from an old cowboy movie that had an outlaw in it named "Three Finger Jack." He wore a single black leather glove on the three finger hand, and was a bad-ass gunfighter. As a lark, I took one of my mom's white cotton gloves that fit very tightly and I dyed it purple. The band would occasionally play at clubs such as Filthy McNasty's and Pandora's Box, but are primarily known for their recordings.

In early 1966 they issued their debut single, "Answer the Phone," on the Jerden label. The group were then signed to MGM records and would release their second and best-known single, "Bring Your Own Self Down," which was composed by Tandyn Almer, who later achieved success with "Along Comes Mary". In 1967 they recorded their final MGM single, a rendition of Laura Nyro's "Poverty Train." They also recorded two songs Love tunes "Can't Explain" and "No Matter What You Do" which were never officially released. The Purple Gang broke up in mid-1967.

Mark Landon, who for a while played guitar with The Music Machine, is now an Emmy award-winning TV and film make-up artist. In 1967, Marty Tryon joined a group called the Lamp of Childhood, who had a contract with ABC Dunhill Records. Bob Corff toured in popular rock musicals such as Hair (musical), Jesus Christ Superstar, and Grease (movie) and became involved in a much-publicized affair with actress June Lockhart and now teachers acting and voice. Alan Wisdom now owns a telephone installation company. Harry Garfield, now using the name Harry Ascher, is Vice President of Universal Studios' Music Department. In the 1970 Marty Tryon worked as a TV session bassist for TV shows such as the Rockford Files and Hill Street Blues would later go on to play with the Smothers Brothers' house band in the Late 1970s and he eventually in addition to lighting and MIDI electronic musical programming, became their production manager. The Purple Gang's recordings have appeared on compilations including Just For Kicks Volume 1, issued by Misty Lane Records, which includes their entire recorded output, as well as The Lost Generation, Vol. 3.

== Membership ==
- Bob Corff (vocals),
- Alan Wisdom (guitar)
- Mark Landon (guitar),
- Marty Tryon (bass)
- Harry Garfield (keyboards)
- Tom Atwater (drums)

== Discography ==
- "Answer the Phone" b/w "Answer the Phone" (Jerden 794, rel. 1966)
- "Bring Your Own Self Down" b/w "One of the Bunch" (MGM 13607, rel. 1966)
- "Poverty Train" (flip side n/a) (MGM, rel. 1967)
