= The Flames =

South African musical group

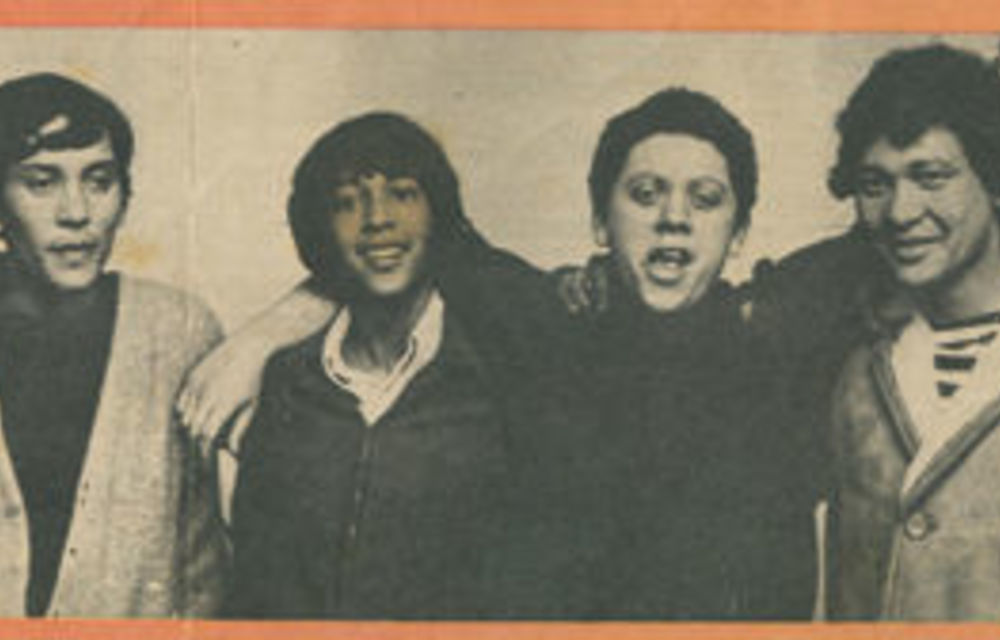
- The Flames in the 1960s. From left to right: Brother Fataar, Ricky Fataar, Blondie Chaplin, and Steve Fataar.

Background information
- Origin: Durban, South Africa
- Genres: Hard rock; power pop; rock and roll; psychedelic pop
- Years active: 1962–1970; 2000; 2011
- Past members: Steve Fataar; Brother Fataar; Ricky Fataar; Blondie Chaplin; George Fabre; Eugene Champion; Edries Fredericks; Mitchell "Baby" Duval; Simon Pontin

The Flames were a South African musical group formed in 1962. The band's best-known lineup consisted of brothers Steve (guitar, vocals), Brother (real name Edries, bass) and Ricky Fataar (drums) and Blondie Chaplin (guitar, vocals). Considered one of the most influential South African acts of all time, the band were known for their blend of soul and rock music.

The group disbanded in 1970, with Blondie Chaplin and Ricky Fataar subsequently joining the Beach Boys. The band has since reunited for performances in 2000 and 2011.

== Biography ==
Before the band's formation, Steve Fataar would enter and win talent shows at the Admiral Hotel. According to Fataar's friend Bing Kinsey, "he continued entering these contests, which put his mother in a bit of a bother as she had to drive him there. I recall that on one occasion, Steve had heard a song by Cliff Richard just once; I'm not sure whether it was 'Gee Whizz It's You' or 'I'm Looking out the Window.' I knew the song and taught it to him. That night he sang it at the talent contest and won." Eventually, Steve's brother, Edries Fataar, would join him shortly after.

The Flames were formed in 1962 by guitarist Steve Fataar, bassist Brother Fataar (real name Edries Fataar), drummer George Fabre, and guitarist Eugene Champion. Shortly before the band were set to play a show, Fabre withdrew from the band, with Ricky Fataar replacing him on drums shortly after.

During their formative years, the band primarily performed covers of The Shadows and The Ventures. Steve served as the band's the lead vocalist, with Eugene and Brother providing harmonies and occasionally providing lead vocals. Because of work commitments, Eugene Champion left the group in 1963, with Edries Fredericks replacing him. Fredericks' vocal abilities led the band to include more vocalization.

In early 1963, the group signed a recording contract with Trutone Records and produced their first recording at a studio in Durban run by John and Margaret Cahill. Two songs were recorded; "I Saw Her Standing There" and "Misery." Trutone decided not to release them, instead heavily promoting The Meteors' version of "I Saw Her Standing There", which became a hit in South Africa.

In April, the group travelled to Johannesburg to record four tracks. The first release from this recording session consisted of two instrumentals, "Mr. Moto" and "Dixie," and were distributed by Rave. "Mr. Moto" premiered on Eric Egan's morning program, leading to the band gaining widespread attention. The band's second single was released soon after, and further singles "Maniac" and "Modern Casanova" were eventually released. The label listed the artists as Steve and The Flames due to Steve Fataar's primary role as the group's frontman. In December, The Flames toured Port Elizabeth. After the shows, The Flames drove to Johannesburg to record their first album.

The band's first album was recorded over three days, with Art Heatley as producer and Dave Erbstoesser as sound engineer. However, "Pretty Woman." became the album's only single to garner radio airplay.

By 1964, the group had begun receiving mainstream reconigition. That year, they won Battle of The Bands, where Ricky was awarded Best Drummer. The group toured throughout the country and began to establish their popularity in the Cape, performing two tours to Cape Town as well as touring the Eastern Cape with shows in Port Elizabeth, Uitenhage and East London.

While songs by The Beatles were featured prominently in their repertoire, The Flames included songs by The Rolling Stones, The Beach Boys, Solomon Burke, Otis Redding and The Fortunes. Despite the group's popularity, the members failed to recoup costs. Edries Fredericks was in a serious relationship at the time, and eventually expressed concerned about the group's finances, culminating in his departure in 1966.

Mitchell "Baby" Duval replaced Edries Fredericks in 1966, and played on the band's second album That's Enough. before leaving the band. Blondie Chaplin, then a member of The Kittens, replaced Duval. The new line-up recorded their third and fourth album "Burning Soul" and "Soulfire", which were both produced by Grahame Beggs. Beggs later recorded a live album at the Al Fresco in Durban, which was eventually scrapped due to Beggs's concerns about the recording's failure to capture the band's sound.

By 1965, the band had begun touring internationally, with The Flames joining the Beach Boys' Brother label and moving to the United States. The group was renamed The Flame to avoid confusion with another band. The band's self-titled fifth album was released in 1970. It was the first ever rock album recorded in quadraphonic sound and the only non-Beach Boys album on the Brother records label, produced by Carl Wilson. The album's single "See The Light," reached the Billboard Hot 100. The group developed a following as they performed at different venues, mainly in the West Coast.

By 1970, Steve and Brother Fataar expressed their discontent living in the United States, with Brother Fataar moving to England shortly after, while Steve Fataar moved back to South Africa. Ricky Fataar and Blondie Chaplin dissolved the remains of the group later that year.

=== Post-break up ===
In early 1972, Ricky Fataar and Blondie Chaplin joined The Beach Boys. Fattar and Chaplin recorded two studio albums and the live The Beach Boys in Concert album. Chaplin left the group at the end of 1973 and worked with a number of other musicians, including members of The Band and The Byrds. He also recorded two solo albums. Since 1997, Chaplin has toured with the Rolling Stones. He is also a member of Skollie, a band formed with Keith Lentin and Anton Fig.

Ricky Fataar remained with the Beach Boys for another year following Chaplin's departure, leaving the band at the end of 1974. In 1978, he starred in the film All You Need Is Cash, as a member of the Rutles, a spoof on the Beatles. Fataar later became a producer, with his first major success being Renée Geyer's So Lucky, which also featured Chaplin as a vocalist. He later moved to Australia, producing a number of successful artists, including Tim Finn, Kate Ceberano, Dragon, and Wendy Matthews. Fataar additionally wrote scores for various Australian films.

Brother Fataar died on September 10, 1978, and Baby Duval died on an unknown date.

The Flames have reunited various times since their disbandment. In 2000 and 2011, the three surviving members of the band reunited for a few shows in South Africa.

Steve Fataar died on January 18, 2020, having performed at a show hours before. According to an IOL news article, Fataar died from his sleep from lung complications.

== Members ==
=== Principal members ===
- Steve Fataar – lead vocals, guitars (1962–1970, 2000, 2011; died 2020))
- Edries "Brother" Fataar – bass guitar, backing and occasional lead vocals (1962–1970; died 1978)
- Ricky Fataar – drums, percussion, backing and occasional lead vocals (1962–1970, 2000, 2011)
- Edries Fredericks – guitars, backing and occasional lead vocals (1963–1966)
- Blondie Chaplin – lead vocals, guitars (1967–1970, 2000, 2011)

=== Other members ===
- George Fabre – drums (1962)
- Eugene Champion – guitars (1962–1963)
- Mitchell "Baby" Duval – guitars, backing and occasional lead vocals (1966–1967)
- Simon Pontin - bass guitar (2000)

Timeline

== Discography ==
=== Singles ===
- "Dixie" b/w "Mr. Moto" (Rave 45 R219) (1963)
- "Maniac" b/w "Modern Casanova" (Rave 45 R220) (1963)
- "One Of These Days" b/w "Don't Play That Song" (Rave 45 R276) (July 1965)
- "Like A Baby" b/w "Glory Of Love" (Rave R285) (August 1966)
- "He'll Only Hurt You" b/w "You Don't Have To Say You Love Me" (Rave R286) (August 1966)
  - Note: Credited to "Zane Adams & the Flames"
- "If You Need Me" b/w "You Better Move On" (Rave R292) (February 1967)
- "Respect" b/w "Down In The Valley" (Rave R295) (March 1967)
- "Streamliner" b/w "Follow the Sun" (1968)
- "Lost" b/w "Restless" (Rave R301) (April 1968)
- "For Your Precious Love" b/w "A Place In The Sun" (Rave R307) (August 1968)
- "Don't Make Your Children Pay" b/w "Purple Haze" (Rave R309) (September 1968)
- "Can't Help Myself" b/w "Purple Raindrops" (Rave R310) (September 1968)
- "Tell It Like It Is" b/w "Don't Fight It" (Trutone TOS539) (April 1969)
- "See The Light" b/w "Get Your Mind Made Up" (Brother 45-3500) (October 1970)
- "Another Day Like Heaven" b/w "I'm So Happy" (Brother D45-3501) (January 1971)
- "If You Need Me" b/w "You Got It Made" (Rave TOS958) (January 1974)

=== Studio albums ===
- Ummm! Ummm! Oh Yeah!!! (1965)
- That's Enough (1967)
- Burning Soul (1967)
- Soulfire!! (1968)
- Soul Meeting!! (1968)
- The Flame (1970)

=== Live albums ===
- Reunion - Shongweni - September 2000 (2021)

=== Compilation Albums ===
- The Best Of The Flames (1969)
- Ball of Flames (1970)
- The Best Of The Flames (1994)
- Psychedelic Essentials (2011) (re-release of The Flame with different track order.)
