= Rick Danko =

Canadian singer, songwriter, and musician (1943–1999)

- Danko in 1969

Background information
- Born: Richard Clare Danko; December 29, 1943 (Note: Danko's birth certificate lists his birth year as 1942. However, Danko's family has repeatedly insisted that this is a mistake, and the correct year is 1943. As per Danko's brother Terry: "There was a discrepancy... my mother sent in his birth certificate I think a year afterward basically. Somehow the date became a year earlier."); Blayney, Ontario, Canada
- Died: December 10, 1999 (aged 55) Marbletown, New York, U.S.
- Genres: Rock; Americana; folk; blues; country; roots rock
- Occupations: Musician; singer; songwriter
- Instruments: Vocals; bass guitar; upright bass; guitar; fiddle
- Years active: 1954–1999
- Labels: Capitol; Arista; Rykodisc
- Formerly of: The Band; Ringo Starr & His All-Starr Band; Danko/Fjeld/Andersen
- Spouse(s): Grace Seldner (m. 1968; div. 1980) Elizabeth Biourd (m. 1989)

Richard Clare Danko (December 29, 1943 – December 10, 1999) was a Canadian musician, bassist, songwriter, and singer, best known as a founding member of the Band, for which he was inducted into the Rock and Roll Hall of Fame in 1994.

During the 1960s, Danko performed as a member of the Hawks, backing Ronnie Hawkins and then Bob Dylan. Then, between 1968 and 1977, Danko and the Hawks, now called the Band, released seven studio albums before breaking up. Beginning with the group's reformation in 1983 and up until his death, Danko participated in the Band's partial reunion.

== Biography ==
=== Early years (1943–1960) ===
Danko was born on December 29, 1943 in Blayney, Ontario, a farming community outside the town of Simcoe, the third of four sons in a musical family of Ukrainian descent. He grew up listening to live music at family gatherings and to country music, blues and R&B on the radio. He especially liked country music, and often his mother would let him stay up late to listen to the Grand Ole Opry on the radio.

His musical influences included Hank Williams, the Carter Family and, later, Sam Cooke. He also drew inspiration from the music of his eldest brother, Junior. Danko's second-eldest brother, Dennis, was an accomplished songwriter, and his younger brother, Terry, also became a musician.

He made his musical debut playing a four-string tenor banjo and guitar for his first-grade classmates, and while various sources differ slightly, all suggest he was headed to a professional career early. One report has him forming as lead guitarist his first "Rick Danko Band" at age 12 or 13, another reference mentions that by age 14 he was putting on country & western shows with his brothers, Maurice Jr., Dennis and Terry, using various group names. It is also written that he started a band at that age with his eldest brother, Maurice Junior and a local high school teacher on drums. This trio performed country music and R & B at local dance halls, sometimes rented themselves, weddings, and other events. The group, "The Starlights", expanded to included accordion, second guitar and "a girl singer", expanded their repertoire to include polkas for newer European immigrants.

By age 17, already a five-year music veteran and having already left the Simcoe Composite School and working by day as a butcher, Danko booked his band The Starlights as the opening act for Ronnie Hawkins.

As a child, Danko was diagnosed with asthma and hyperactivity. He was medicated for the latter, though recalled in an interview that he was "a little before Ritalin", which was not in widespread use until the late 1950s. In a 1977 interview, Danko mentioned that he had stopped taking medication for his "nerves" four years prior.

=== The Hawks (1960–1964) ===
Hawkins invited Danko to join the Hawks as rhythm guitarist. Around this time, Hawks bassist Rebel Paine was fired by Hawkins, who, wasting no time, ordered Danko to learn to play the bass with help from other members in the band. By September 1960, he was Hawkins's bassist.

In 1961, Danko with drummer Levon Helm backed guitarist Lenny Breau on several tracks recorded at Hallmark Studios in Toronto. These tracks are included on the 2003 release The Hallmark Sessions.

Soon joined by pianist Richard Manuel and multi-instrumentalist Garth Hudson, the Hawks played with Hawkins through mid-1963. An altercation that year between Danko and Hawkins led Danko, Levon Helm, Robbie Robertson, Manuel, and Hudson to give two-weeks' notice in early 1964, and they parted ways with Hawkins on reasonably amicable terms. The group had been planning to break with Hawkins and continue together as a band without a frontman, as a team of equal members.

=== Pre-Band (1964–1968) ===
Danko and the former Hawks initially performed as the Levon Helm Sextet with saxophonist Jerry Penfound. After Penfound left, they changed their name to The Canadian Squires, and finally to Levon and the Hawks. Playing a circuit that stretched geographically from Ontario to Arkansas, they became known as "the best damn bar band in the land."

In August 1965, Mary Martin, an assistant to Bob Dylan's manager Albert Grossman, heard Levon and the Hawks perform. Grossman introduced the band's music to Dylan, who was impressed. The band was performing at Tony Mart's, a popular club in Somers Point, New Jersey, and Grossman's office called the club to speak with Levon and the group about touring with Dylan.

Helm was not happy to be backing a "strummer" but reluctantly agreed, and the band became Dylan's backup group for a tour beginning in September. The tour, however, became too much for Helm, who departed in November. Through May 1966, Dylan and the remaining foursome (together with pick-up drummers, including the actor and musician Mickey Jones) traveled across the U.S., Australia, and Europe. After the final shows in Britain, Dylan retreated to his new home in Woodstock, New York, and the Hawks joined him there shortly thereafter.

=== The Band (1968–1977) ===
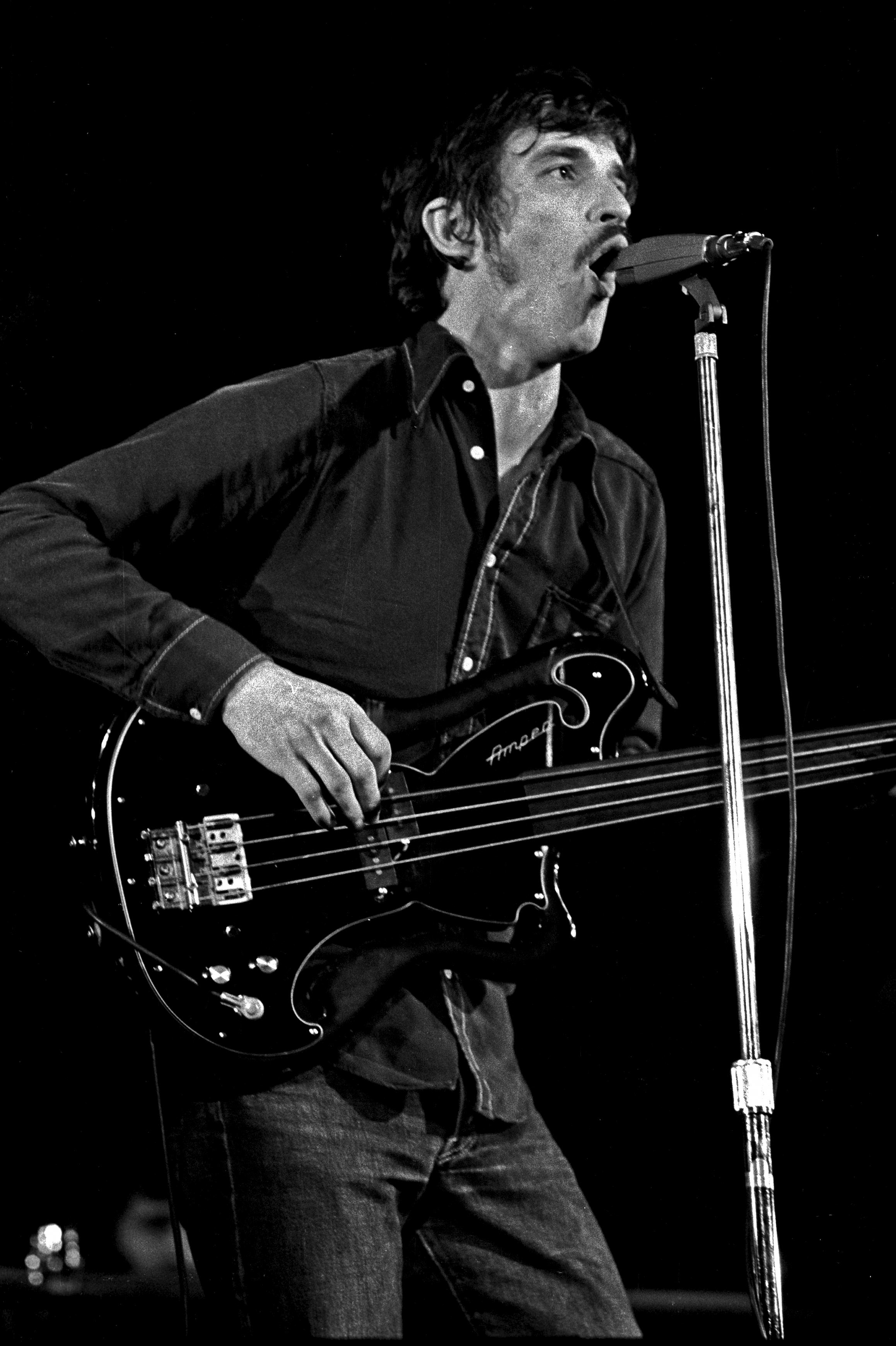
Danko on stage with The Band in 1971

It was Danko who found the pink house on Parnassus Lane in Saugerties, New York, which became known as Big Pink. Danko, Hudson, and Manuel moved in, and Robertson lived nearby. The Band's musical sessions with Dylan took place in the basement of Big Pink, between June and October 1967, generating recordings that were officially released in 1975 as The Basement Tapes. In October, the Hawks began demo recordings for their first album, with Helm rejoining the group in that month. Their manager, Albert Grossman, secured them a recording deal with Capitol Records in late 1967.

From January to March 1968, the Band recorded their debut album, Music from Big Pink, in recording studios in New York and Los Angeles. On this album, Danko sang lead vocal on three songs: "Caledonia Mission", "Long Black Veil" and "This Wheel's on Fire."

Before the Band could promote the album by touring, Danko was severely injured in a car accident, breaking his neck and back in six places, which put him in traction for months. While he was in traction, Danko's girlfriend, Grace Seldner, informed him that she was pregnant, and he proposed from his hospital bed. When they married at the Church of the Holy Transfiguration of Christ-on-the-Mount in Woodstock, Danko was still in a neck brace. Rick and Grace divorced in October 1980.

The Band finally made their concert debut at Bill Graham's Winterland Ballroom in San Francisco in April 1969. By this time, they were already hard at work on their eponymous second album. On that record, sometimes known as the Brown Album, Danko sang what would become two of his signature songs—and two of the group's best-loved classics: "When You Awake" and "Unfaithful Servant." Both songs exemplified Danko's talents as a lead singer and demonstrated his naturally plaintive voice.

Danko is featured in the documentary film Festival Express, about an all-star tour by train across Canada in 1970. On the train, he sings an impromptu version of "Ain't No More Cane" with Jerry Garcia and Janis Joplin.

In an interview published in Guitar Player, Danko cited bassists James Jamerson, Ron Carter, Edgar Willis, and Chuck Rainey as his musical influences. He eventually moved from the Fender Jazz Bass to an Ampeg fretless model and later a Gibson Ripper for The Last Waltz.

=== Later years (1977–1999) ===
After the Band performed its farewell concert (The Last Waltz) at Winterland in November 1976, Danko was offered a contract with Arista Records by Clive Davis, making him the first Band member to record a solo album. Issued in 1977, his self-titled début featured each of his former bandmates in addition to Ronnie Wood, Ringo Starr, Eric Clapton, Doug Sahm, Blondie Chaplin, and Danko's brother, Terry. The album was primarily recorded at the Band's California studio, Shangri-La. The poor sales of the album destined it for rarity status. After he recorded an unreleased follow-up album, Danko was dropped from Arista. The follow-up album was finally released as a part of Cryin' Heart Blues in 2005.

In early 1979 Danko opened shows for Boz Scaggs. Also in 1979, Danko and Paul Butterfield toured together as the Danko/Butterfield Band. Among the songs they covered was "Sail On, Sailor", originally recorded by the Beach Boys, with Blondie Chaplin, who toured with Danko/Butterfield, on guitar and vocals. From 1983 to 1999, Danko alternated between a reformed version of the Band featuring Helm, Hudson, and guitarist Jim Weider (and, from 1983 to 1986, Manuel); a solo career; and collaborations including award-winning work with singer-songwriter Eric Andersen and Norway's Jonas Fjeld as Danko/Fjeld/Andersen.

In 1984, Danko joined members of the Byrds, the Flying Burrito Brothers and others in a touring company called "The Byrds Twenty-Year Celebration." Several members of this band performed solo songs to start the show including Danko, who performed "Mystery Train". In 1989, he toured with Levon Helm and Garth Hudson as part of Ringo Starr's first All-Starr Band. On July 21, 1990, in Roger Waters's stage production of The Wall Concert in Berlin, Danko sang on the Pink Floyd songs "Comfortably Numb" and "Mother", the former with Van Morrison, Roger Waters, and Levon Helm, and the latter with Helm and Sinéad O'Connor. He recorded demos and made a number of appearances on albums by other artists throughout the 1980s and 1990s, and, in 1997, released Rick Danko in Concert. Two years later, a third solo album (Live on Breeze Hill) was released, and Danko was at work on a fourth (Times Like These) at the time of his death.

In the meantime, the Band (without Robbie Robertson and Richard Manuel) recorded three more albums, and Danko teamed with Fjeld and Andersen for two trio albums, Danko/Fjeld/Andersen in 1991 and Ridin' on the Blinds in 1994.

In 1994, Danko was inducted into the Rock and Roll Hall of Fame as a member of the Band.

Danko struggled with heroin addiction. On May 6, 1997, he was arrested in Japan for drug smuggling after his wife sent him heroin. Danko pleaded not guilty, but acknowledged having used heroin and stated that he would seek help if he were allowed to return to the United States. After spending ten and a half weeks in prison, Danko was released and given a suspended sentence.

== Death ==
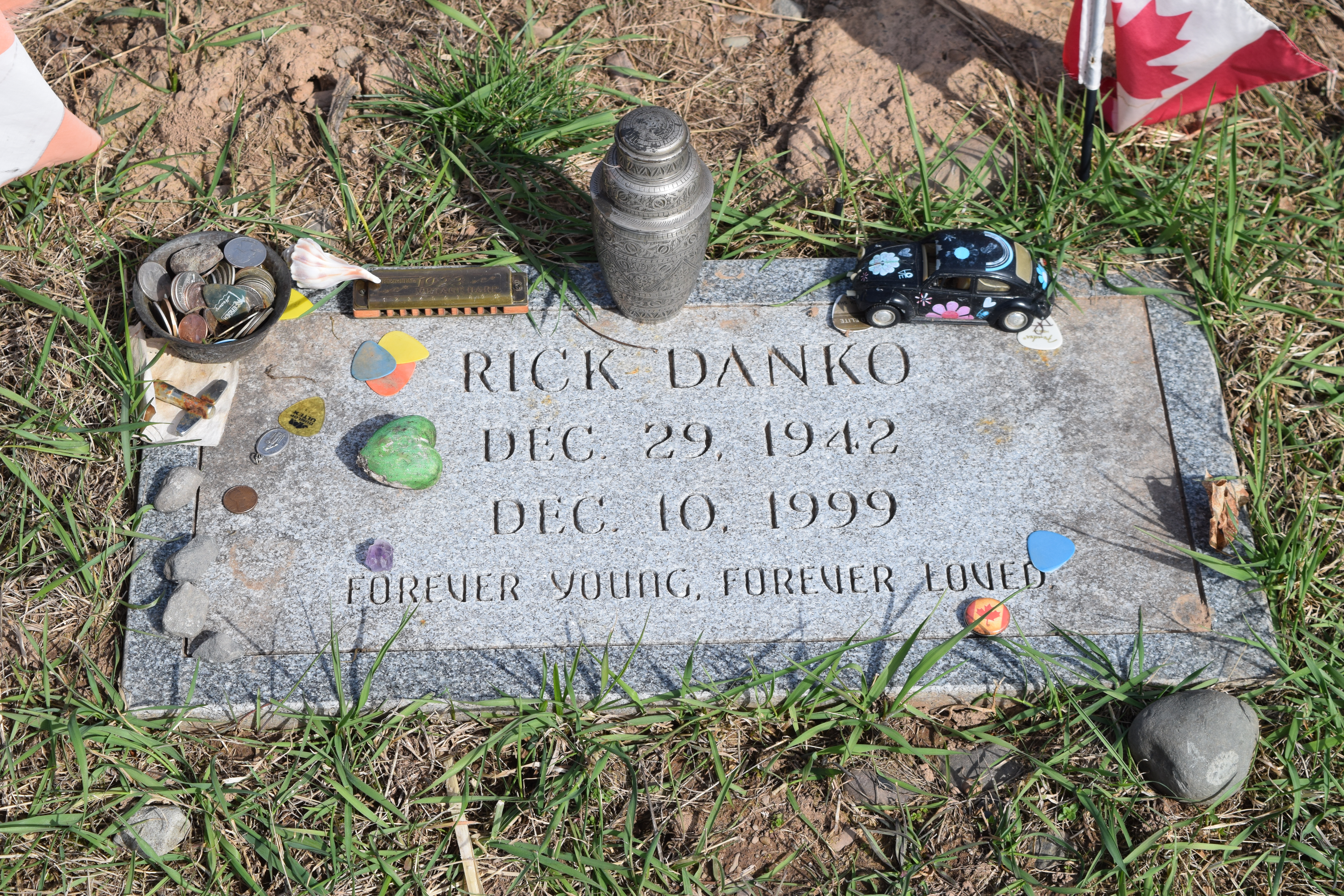
Danko's grave at the Woodstock Cemetery. Due to a mistake on Danko's birth certificate, his birth year is listed as 1942 rather than 1943.

On December 10, 1999, days after the end of a brief tour of the Midwest that included two shows in the Chicago area and a final gig at the Ark in Ann Arbor, Michigan, Danko died of heart failure in his sleep at his home in Marbletown, New York. He was 55.

He was survived by his second wife, Elizabeth (died 2013), whom he had married in 1989, a stepson, Justin, and a daughter, Lisa, from his first marriage. His son Eli, from Danko's first marriage, died in 1989, at age 18, from asphyxiation after heavy drinking while attending the State University of New York at Albany. Danko was buried next to Eli at Woodstock Cemetery, Woodstock, New York.

== Legacy ==
For the April 2012 edition of Bass Musician: Bass Magazine for Bass Players and the Bass Industry, Rob Collier wrote an article titled "How to Danko: A Lesson in the Style of Rick Danko".

In the Irish Times, Laurence Mackin wrote:

Together with bass player Rick Danko, [Levon] Helm formed one of the finest rhythm sections to ever put a groove to a beat, and a partnership that formed the backbone of the Band. In Danko, he had the perfect complementary player, one of the finest bassists and one of the gentlest souls. His music was subtle, his instinct for just the right note unwavering – he could play one beat in four bars, but lord could he make it count. Their subtle, intense rhythmic conversation brought shape and distinction to the Band's music – it gave it heart and soul.

The Drive-By Truckers' song "Danko/Manuel," written by Jason Isbell, was released on their album The Dirty South in 2004. Steve Forbert released "Wild as the Wind (A Tribute to Rick Danko)" on Just Like There's Nothin' To It in 2004. Martin Hagfors honored Danko on the Home Groan song You Made a Difference in 2000.

A number of musical artists have cited Danko as an influence, including Elvis Costello, John Doe, Mumford & Sons, Lucinda Williams, Jay Farrar, Neko Case, Robbie Fulks, Cindy Cashdollar, Craig Finn of the Hold Steady, Chris Tomson of Vampire Weekend, Mike Watt, and Eric Clapton who said "Rick's singing has had a tremendous influence on me ... you have to be a great musician before you can sing like that."

Rick Danko memorial plaque May 30, 2020. Blayney, Ontario

== Notable instruments ==
Danko used various basses throughout his career. He played a mid-sixties sunburst Fender Jazz Bass on the 1966 World Tour with Bob Dylan, and on the recording of Music from Big Pink and The Band, as well as early live shows by the Band, including Woodstock and the Isle of Wight Festival. In late 1969, the Band was given some equipment by Ampeg, which included a fretted Ampeg AEB, a fretless Ampeg AMUB and an Ampeg "Baby Bass", a fiberglass-made electric upright bass. The fretless AMUB, modified with a Precision Bass pickup (see picture above, of Danko performing with the Band in Hamburg, 1971), was his bass of choice for the next years to come, and can be heard prominently on Stage Fright and Cahoots, and was used live, as can be seen in the film Festival Express also in video footage included in the Live at the Academy of Music 1971 release. This fretless bass was sold on eBay from a private collection in early 2012 for $35,000. He was also seen performing with Fender Precision Basses and he also owned four Gibson Rippers, and would change out the pickups to experiment with different tones. Photos and video show him often playing a blonde one and also a sunburst, which was featured in The Last Waltz.

Throughout the 1990s, Danko played a custom-built hollow-body electric bass by luthier Mark Dan, with Alembic pickups, which he referred to as "One of the greatest basses that I've ever had". His other main bass throughout the 1990s was a red electric hollowbody bass from the Norwegian Workshop Guitar Company with two types of Alembic Pickups. His amp of choice was a blueline Ampeg SVT, and he also used a 1959 Fender Bassman.

== Discography ==
=== Studio albums ===
Solo

- Rick Danko (1977) (U.S. #119)

With Danko/Fjeld/Andersen

- Danko/Fjeld/Andersen (1991)
- Ridin' on the Blinds (1994)

Other appearance

- "Blue Tail Fly" for American Children (1989)

=== Live and compilation ===
Live albums

- Rick Danko in Concert (1997)
- Live on Breeze Hill (1999)

Compilation albums

- Times Like These (2000)
- Cryin' Heart Blues (2005)

Archival releases

- At Dylan's Cafe (2007)
- Live at the Tin Angel, 1999 (2011)
- Live at Uncle Willy's, 1989 (2011)
- Live at the Iron Horse, Northampton 1995 with Blondie Chaplin and Ed Kaercher (2011)

=== Session work ===
Bob Dylan

- Self Portrait - bass and background vocals (1970)
- Planet Waves - bass (1974)

Indigo Girls

- Come On Now Social (1999)

Richard Manuel

- Whispering Pines: Live at the Getaway (2002)
- Live at O'Tooles Tavern (2009)
- Live at the Lone Star Cafe, 1984 with Paul Butterfield (2011)

Robbie Robertson

- Robbie Robertson - background vocals on "Sonny Got Caught In The Moonlight" (1987)
- Storyville - background vocals on "Hold Back the Dawn" (1991)

Todd Rundgren

- Runt - bass on "Once Burned" (1970)

Ringo Starr

- Ringo - fiddle on "Sunshine Life for Me (Sail Away Raymond)" (1973)

Neil Young

- On The Beach - bass on "Revolution Blues" (1974)

== Filmography ==
- 1978: The Last Waltz
- 1986: Man Outside
- 1987: Rick Danko's Electric Bass Techniques (home video)
- 1990: The Wall – Live in Berlin
- 1993: The 30th Anniversary Concert Celebration
- 2003: Festival Express

== See also ==
- List of bass guitarists
- Fretless bass
