= Tandyn Almer =

American songwriter, musician, and record producer (1942–2013)

- Born: July 30, 1942; Minneapolis, Minnesota, U.S.
- Died: January 8, 2013 (aged 70) McLean, Virginia, U.S.
- Genres: Pop
- Labels: Warner Bros.; A&M Records; Sundazed
- Formerly of: The Association, The Beach Boys, The Garden Club, The Purple Gang, Dennis Olivieri

Tandyn Douglas Almer (July 30, 1942 – January 8, 2013) was an American songwriter, musician, and record producer who wrote the 1966 song "Along Comes Mary" for the Association. He also wrote, co-wrote, and produced numerous other songs performed by artists such as the Beach Boys, the Purple Gang, the Garden Club, and Dennis Olivieri. In the early 1970s, he was a close friend and collaborator of Brian Wilson, co-writing the Beach Boys' singles "Marcella" (1972) and "Sail On, Sailor" (1973).

== Early life ==
Almer was born in Minneapolis. During his adolescence, he attended a music conservatory in Minnesota and became fascinated with the music of John Coltrane, Miles Davis and Ahmad Jamal. At age 17, he quit high school and moved to Chicago to become a jazz pianist. In the early 1960s, he relocated once more to Los Angeles where his musical interests shifted to pop and rock after he became enamored by the oeuvre of Bob Dylan. During this period, he attended Los Angeles City College.

== Career ==
His most prominent achievement was writing the 1966 U.S. Top 10 hit "Along Comes Mary" for the Association. Claudia Ford, then married to Association producer Curt Boettcher, claimed that Almer wrote "Along Comes Mary" as a slow song. Boettcher helped Almer arrange the tune, sang the vocal on the demo and accelerated the tempo. That version, as provided to the Association, became the group's breakthrough single from their debut album, which Boettcher produced. The two also co-wrote "Message of Our Love", another song on the same album. After the success of "Along Comes Mary", Almer was featured alongside Frank Zappa, Graham Nash, Roger McGuinn, and Brian Wilson on Inside Pop: The Rock Revolution, a 1967 CBS News documentary presented by Leonard Bernstein. Almer's sole non-posthumous commercial release under his own name was "Degeneration Gap", a piano-driven single released by Warner Bros. in 1969.

In 1970, he produced the Dennis Olivieri album Come to the Party. While a songwriter for A&M Records in the early 1970s, he was introduced to and became friends with Brian Wilson; in a 2010 interview, Wilson characterized Almer as his "best friend". According to musician Joseph Deaguero, who introduced Almer to Wilson, "Everyone thought he was going to be the next Dylan or Elton John. Tandyn was totally an eccentric, but he was in a league of his own. You listen to his music and say, 'God, this guy was really good.'" Although they ultimately became estranged owing to a variety of factors (including Almer's alleged theft of recording equipment from the Beach Boys Studio and an alleged extramarital affair between Marilyn Wilson and Almer), the two collaborated in the early 1970s on several projects, including an aborted album of re-recorded Beach Boys songs with more topical lyrics for A&M, an intensive weeklong study of George Gershwin's "Rhapsody in Blue" and the Beach Boys singles "Marcella" and "Sail On, Sailor". While frequently caricatured by Beach Boys insiders as a kind of precocious/debaucherous corollary to Wilson's 1966-67 social circle, Almer encouraged Wilson to continue to seek professional remediation of his mental health condition throughout their friendship, which largely coincided with one of the most psychologically tumultuous periods in the songwriter's life.

During this period, Almer invented a water pipe called the Slave-Master, described by Jack S. Margolis and Richard Clorfene in A Child's Garden of Grass as "the perfect bong".

Around 1974, Almer moved to the Washington metropolitan area, where he lived for the remainder of his life. Although he wrote songs for the annual Hexagon satirical revue and several fake books (consisting of simplified arrangements of popular songs), he mainly subsisted on "intermittent royalty checks". His bipolar disorder often resulted in "erratic mood swings" and abject insomnia; according to Thomas Bernath (a musician who befriended Almer), "He used to tell me the music got better the longer he stayed awake. He didn't feel like playing until he had been awake for two or three days." Almer continued to record prolifically, amassing a private collection of hundreds of tapes.

== Death ==
Almer died in McLean, Virginia on January 8, 2013, aged 70, from a combination of illnesses, including atrial fibrillation, congestive heart failure, and chronic obstructive pulmonary disease. Shortly after, Along Comes Tandyn, an album consisting of demos of his early songs recorded by professional studio musicians, was released in 2013 on Sundazed Music. In the liner notes, Parke Puterbaugh, a former senior editor of Rolling Stone, called Almer "one of the lost and hidden voices of the '60s," adding that Almer "left behind a body of work that's ripe for rediscovery."
