= Blondie Chaplin =

South African singer and guitarist (born 1951)

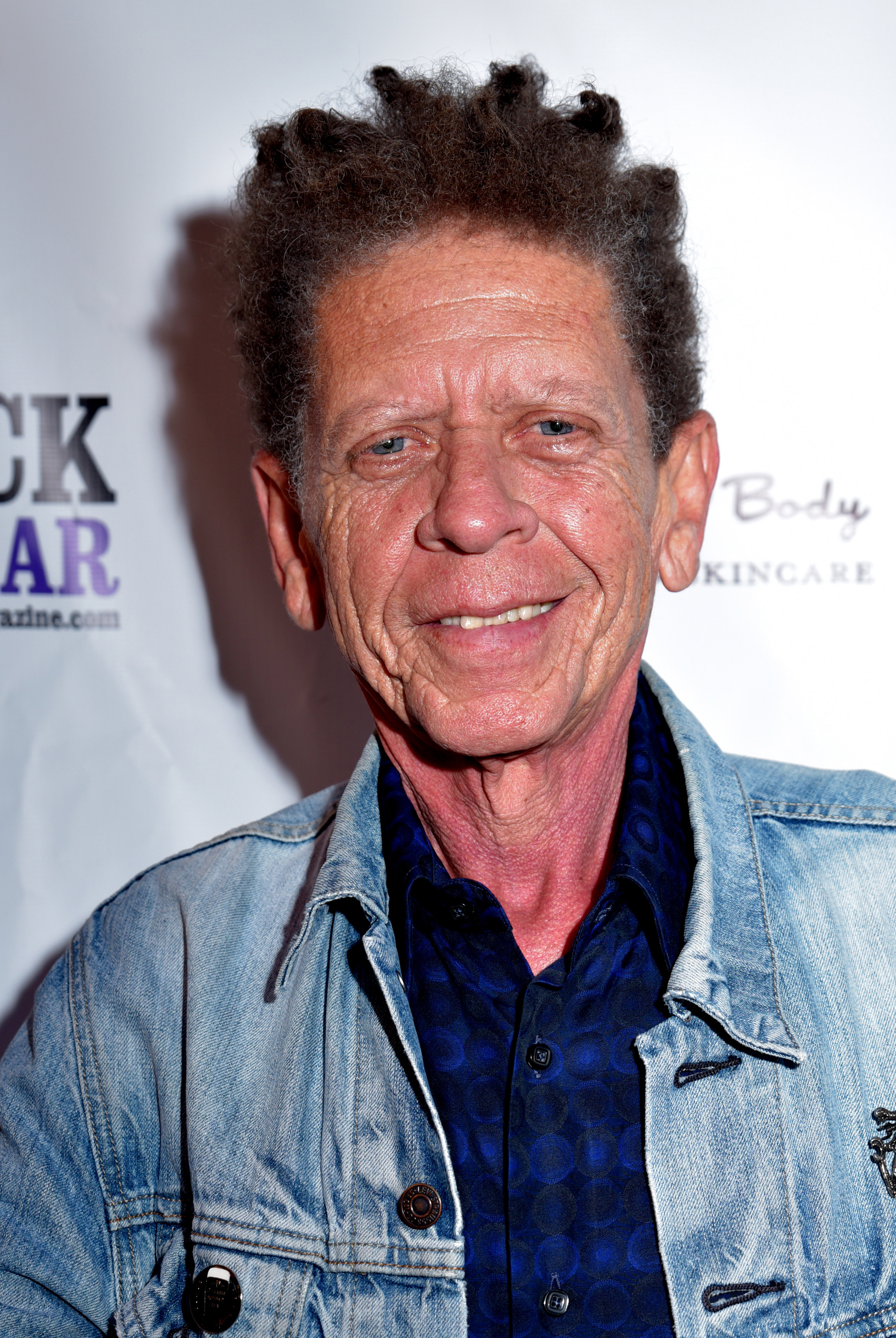
- Chaplin in 2019

Background information
- Born: Terrence William Chaplin; 7 July 1951 (age 75); South Africa
- Genres: Rock; blues; blues-rock; ska; reggae; rocksteady
- Occupations: Singer; musician; songwriter
- Instruments: Vocals; guitar; bass
- Years active: 1968–present
- Labels: Brother Records; Reprise Records; Capitol Records; Columbia Records; Asylum Records
- Formerly of: The Flames; The Beach Boys; The Rolling Stones; Brian Wilson Band

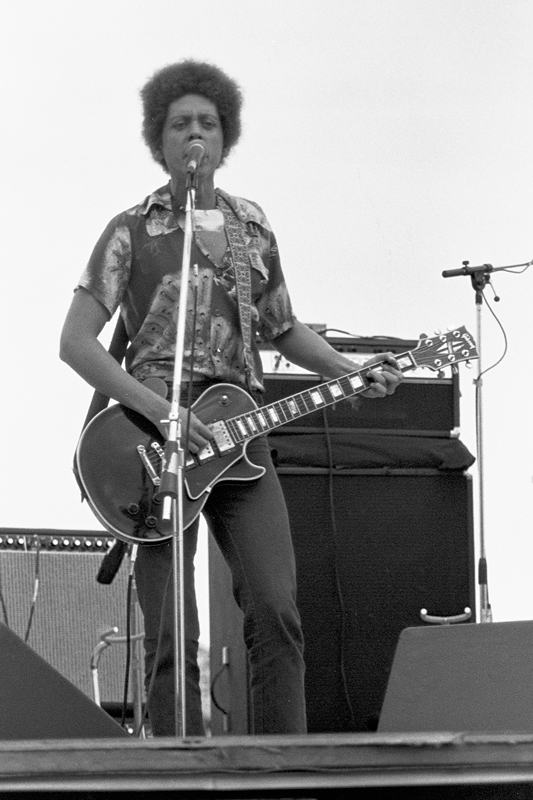
Blondie Chaplin, Woodstock Reunion, 9/7/79, Parr Meadows, Ridge, NY

Terrence William "Blondie" Chaplin (born 7 July 1951) is a South African singer and guitarist from Durban, where he played in the band the Flames in the mid to late 1960s. From 1972 to 1973, he was a member of the Beach Boys and contributed to their albums Carl and the Passions – "So Tough" (1972) and Holland (1973). During his stint with the Beach Boys, he sang the lead on the popular song, "Sail On Sailor". Chaplin was a long-term backing vocalist, percussionist, and acoustic rhythm guitarist for the Rolling Stones on their recordings and tours over a 15-year period, starting in 1997. Chaplin has released two solo albums, Blondie Chaplin (1977) and Between Us (2006).

== Early life ==
Chaplin grew up in South Africa and is of mixed racial descent.

== Career ==
=== The Flames ===
Both Chaplin and drummer Ricky Fataar were members of Durban-based rock band the Flames, which they joined at ages 13 and 9, respectively. Their 1968 album Soulfire produced a hit in South Africa: the band's cover of "For Your Precious Love" was No. 1 on white radio for thirteen weeks.

=== The Beach Boys ===
Beach Boy Carl Wilson heard the Flames while the band was performing in London. Wilson signed them to the Beach Boys' Brother Records label and produced their album The Flame (changed from Flames, to avoid confusion with the Famous Flames who were backup singers with James Brown), which featured soulful rock-pop songs in the vein of the Beach Boys and Badfinger. The Flames were the only band aside from the Beach Boys to record for Brother Records.

Chaplin, along with Fataar, joined the Beach Boys when original drummer Dennis Wilson suffered a hand injury that left him unable to play the drums for almost two years.

For the Beach Boys, it was a period in which long-time member Bruce Johnston had departed the band, and one-time leader Brian Wilson's participation in the group was very limited. As a result, Chaplin and Fataar joined the Beach Boys as full-fledged members and not merely as backing musicians. Chaplin sang lead on various Beach Boys songs from two studio albums, Carl and the Passions – "So Tough" and Holland, and plays on the live album The Beach Boys in Concert. "Sail On, Sailor" from Holland, on which he is the lead singer, is his "signature song". Chaplin left the group in 1973 after a dispute with the Beach Boys' management; Fataar left the band the following year.

=== The Rolling Stones ===
Chaplin toured with former Rolling Stones guitarist Mick Taylor and performed on his live album Stranger in This Town. Starting in 1997, with the recording and release of Bridges to Babylon and subsequent tour, and, for some 15 years following, Chaplin served as a backing vocalist, percussionist, and, at times, backing guitar player for the Rolling Stones, in the recording studio and on the road. Bridges to Babylon lists Chaplin's credits as backing vocals, tambourine, piano, bass guitar, percussion, shakers, and maracas.

=== Brian Wilson ===
In late 2013, Chaplin was featured at select shows of former Beach Boys bandmate Brian Wilson, who toured along with former Beach Boys members Al Jardine and David Marks and guitarist Jeff Beck. Chaplin also appears on Wilson's 2015 album No Pier Pressure, on which he is the featured vocalist on the song "Sail Away", and he then went on tour as a featured performer, along with Jardine, for Brian Wilson's 2015 tour, with Rodriguez as the opening act.

He joined Wilson's Pet Sounds 50th Anniversary World Tour in 2016, performing alongside the touring band, and continued to tour with Wilson through 2022.

=== Other projects ===
Following his time with the Beach Boys, Chaplin recorded a self-titled album, released on Asylum Records in 1977. He also performed on Rick Danko's self-titled début album, which also featured each of Danko's former bandmates from the Band in addition to Ronnie Wood, Eric Clapton, Doug Sahm, and Danko's brother, Terry.

Chaplin went on to tour with the David Johansen group and participated in producing Johansen's third solo album Here Comes the Night, on which Chaplin plays guitar and sings backing vocals and co-authored seven tracks. During the late 1980s and early 1990s Chaplin toured with the Band, replacing some of Richard Manuel's vocals and playing guitar and, occasionally, drums.

During the 1980s, Chaplin also toured with a band featuring Danko and Paul Butterfield, and was guitarist and vocalist, as well as contributing a tune as songwriter, on Butterfield's last studio album, The Legendary Paul Butterfield Rides Again, released in 1986.

Chaplin was also a featured player in former Byrds members Gene Clark and Michael Clarke's then new band, the 20th Anniversary Celebration of the Byrds, also known as the Tribute to the Byrds. Chaplin appeared on the Jennifer Warnes albums Shot Through the Heart, The Hunter, and The Well.

Chaplin also played on High on the Hog, the ninth studio album by the Band, released in 1996, to which he also contributed his composition "Where I Should Always Be".

Chaplin is the vocalist, songwriter, and lead guitar player with Skollie, a band formed with fellow South Africans Keith Lentin on bass and Anton Fig (of the CBS Orchestra) on drums. Chaplin has recorded three solo albums, most recently Between Us in 2006.

== Beach Boys recognition ==
On 29 September 2017, Big Noise's Al Gomes and Connie Watrous presented a plaque from Roger Williams University to Chaplin at The Zeiterion Theatre in New Bedford, Massachusetts. Chaplin's response to the sold-out audience at the "Brian Wilson Presents Pet Sounds" show: "I played a lot in these parts in 1971, and it's nice to be remembered this way." The plaque commemorates the Beach Boys' 22 September 1971 concert at the Ramada Inn in Portsmouth, Rhode Island, (now RWU's Baypoint Inn & Conference Center). The concert was the first-ever appearance of Chaplin as well as Fataar as official members of the Beach Boys, essentially changing the band's live and recording line-up into a multi-cultural group.

== Discography ==
Year	Album details
1977	Blondie Chaplin: Released: 1977; Label: Asylum Records; Tracks: Bye Bye Babe; Can You Hear Me; Crazy Love; Woman Don't Cry; Loose Lady; Be My Love; Lonely Traveller; Riverboat Queen; Say You Need Me; For Your Love; Gimme More Rock 'N' Roll
2006	Between Us: Released: 2006; Label: Big Karma Records; Tracks: Between Us; Heal the Rage; Hurricane; So Hard; Mother Smother; Children of War; Love Power; Heads on Fire; Love You Till I Die; Crawl

Other albums and videos from the Blondie Chaplin catalog:

- The Flames – That's Enough, 1967
- The Flames – Burning Soul!, 1967
- The Flames – Soulfire!!, 1968
- The Flames – The Flame, Brother Records, 1970
- The Beach Boys – Carl and the Passions – "So Tough", 1972
- The Beach Boys – Holland, 1973
- The Beach Boys – The Beach Boys in Concert, 1973
- David Johansen – Here Comes the Night, Blue Sky Records, 1981
- Paul Butterfield – The Legendary Paul Butterfield Rides Again, Amherst Records, 1986
- Rey Ohara – picaresque (Rey Ohara alum), Toshiba-EMI limited,1988
- Anton Fig – "In the Groove", DVD, 1994
- The Rolling Stones - Bridges to Babylon : bass, backing vocals, maracas (track 3), piano (tracks 4, 13), tambourine (track 11), 1997
- Blondie Chaplin – Fragile Thread, unreleased (but in circulation), 2001
- Anton Fig – Figments, 2002 (with Brian Wilson singing backup vocals on "Hand on My Shoulder", one of several songs on the album composed by Chaplin with Fig)
- The Rolling Stones - A Bigger Bang : vocals (7, 16), 2005
- Rick Danko – Cryin' Heart Blues, 2005
- Ronnie Wood - I Feel Like Playing : Backing vocals (tracks: 3, 5, 8), 2010
- Lou Pallo of Les Paul's Trio – Thank You Les / Tribute to Les Paul, CD & DVD 2012
- Beth Hart and Joe Bonamassa – Seesaw, 2013
- Beth Hart and Joe Bonamassa – Live in Amsterdam, CD & DVD, 2014
- Brian Wilson – No Pier Pressure, 2015
- Keith Richards - Crosseyed Heart, 2015 : backing vocals (11–13, 15)
- The Rolling Stones - No Security San Jose '99, 2018
- The Rolling Stones - Bridges to Bremen, 2019
- The Rolling Stones - Live on Copacabanna Beach, 2021
- The Rolling Stones - Licked Live in NYC, 2022

Additional performances are on the following recordings:

- Bonnie Raitt – Nine Lives
- Ray Ohara – Picaresque, (released 1988 in Japan and on which Blondie was principal songwriter, guitarist, and lead vocalist on all songs)
- a Keith Richards-produced project, Wingless Angels (featuring singers from Jamaica)
- Charlie Watts/Jim Keltner Project
- Two Faced by Freida Parton (Dolly Parton's sister)
- Renée Geyer – So Lucky and her self-titled album
- Elliott Murphy – Change Will Come and Paris/New York
- Paul Shaffer – The World’s Most Dangerous Party
- The Parlor Dogs – Social Harem
- Sir Mack Rice – This What I Do
- Chris Whitley – Rocket House
- Marsha Hansen's My Soul Is a Witness (a CD accompanying a book with that title)
- Timeless: Hank Williams Tribute album
- Hubert Sumlin – About Them Shoes
