= Terry Danko =

Canadian musician and songwriter

- Born: June 25, 1949; Greens Corners, Ontario, Canada
- Died: May 25, 2026 (aged 76)
- Genre: Rock
- Occupations: Musician, songwriter
- Instruments: Vocals, bass, percussion, guitar, mandolin, banjo, piano, drums
- Years active: 1961–2020s
- Labels: Columbia, Epic, Cobalt Blue, Counterpoint

Terry Danko (June 25, 1949 - May 25, 2026) was a Canadian musician and songwriter active from childhood. He wrote, performed and recorded his own material as a solo artist and as a member of a number of groups, such as Tin Pan Alley, Bearfoot and Terry Danko, Marty Grebb and Friends.

Danko also worked as an accompanist and/or session musician for several notable acts, such as Ronnie Hawkins, Eric Clapton, Stephen Stills, George Harrison, The Rolling Stones and his brother, former member of The Band, the late Rick Danko.
