= His Greatest Hits =

His Greatest Hits may refer to various compilation albums and Greatest Hits collections.

Albums with this title include:

- His Greatest Hits (Elvis Presley album) 1983
- His Greatest Hits, Engelbert Humperdinck 1974, remastered 1988
- His Greatest Hits, Ray Charles 1992

Albums with similar titles include:

- The Man in Black – His Greatest Hits, Johnny Cash album
- Presents His Hits in Concert, one of the first of countless CD releases of the 1981 UK live album Glen Campbell Live
- His 12 Greatest Hits, a compilation album by Neil Diamond issued in 1974 on the MCA record label
- His Definitive Greatest Hits, a compilation album by American blues musician B. B. King
- A Collection of His Greatest Hits, a compilation album by American recording artist Babyface released in 2000

Sings His Greatest Hits

- Neil Sedaka Sings His Greatest Hits, 1963
- Little Richard Sings His Greatest Hits, 1966
- Billy "Crash" Craddock Sings His Greatest Hits, a greatest hits collection by the country singer, 1978
- Dion (singer) Sings His Greatest Hits, 1962
- George Jones Sings His Greatest Hits (Starday 1962)
- Tony Williams (singer) Sings His Greatest Hits, 1962
- Ernest Ashworth Sings His Greatest Hits, 1976
- Grandpa Jones Sings His Greatest Hits, 1954
- Colin Blunstone Sings His Greatest Hits, 1991
- Frank Sinatra Sings His Greatest Hits (Columbia/Legacy, 1997)
- Sings His Best Hits for Capitol Records, Ronnie Milsap

See also albums with the name of artist in title:

- Glen Campbell Live! His Greatest Hits 1994
- Ritchie Valens...His Greatest Hits Volume 2
- Diana: Paul Anka Sings His Greatest Hits

== See also ==
- Greatest Hits (disambiguation)
- Her Greatest Hits (disambiguation)
- Their Greatest Hits (disambiguation)
