= History of Ritchie Valens =

Compilation album by Ritchie Valens
- Released: 1981
- Recorded: 1958–1959
- Genre: Rock and roll
- Label: Rhino
- Producer: Robert Keane

Ritchie Valens chronology
Ritchie Valens...His Greatest Hits Volume 2 (1964)	History of Ritchie Valens (1981)	The Best of Ritchie Valens (1987)

History of Ritchie Valens is a 3-record box set by Ritchie Valens released in 1985, featuring his three original Del-Fi albums (Ritchie Valens, Ritchie, & Ritchie Valens In Concert at Pacoima Jr. High) plus a booklet with biography and photos.

The albums were replicated with the same covers as the original releases, with a cautionary note in the booklet indicating that the addresses shown on the covers were no longer valid. The records themselves were pressed with an "updated" version of the Del-Fi "diamonds" label in black with olive green print as opposed to the sea green color used for the originals.

In 1987, amidst the success of the Ritchie Valens bio film La Bamba, Rhino reissued all three albums separately along with a compilation issued in 1981, The Best of Ritchie Valens.
