= La Bamba (soundtrack) =

La Bamba: Original Motion Picture Soundtrack

Soundtrack album by Los Lobos and various artists
- Released: June 30, 1987
- Studio: Record Plant
- Genres: Rock and roll; Tex-Mex; rockabilly; pop rock; heartland rock
- Length: 30:53
- Labels: Slash (North America); Warner Bros. (North America); London (elsewhere)
- Producers: Mitchell Froom; Steve Berlin; Don Davis; Garry Tallent; Marshall Crenshaw; Willie Dixon

Los Lobos and various artists chronology
La Bamba: Original Motion Picture Soundtrack (1987)	La Bamba Volume 2: More Music from the Original Motion Picture Soundtrack (1988)

Los Lobos chronology
By the Light of the Moon (1987)	La Bamba: Original Motion Picture Soundtrack (1987)	La Pistola y El Corazón (1988)

La Bamba: Original Motion Picture Soundtrack is the soundtrack album to the 1987 American biographical film of the same name, released on June 30, 1987 by Slash Records and Warner Bros. Records in North America and London Recordings in the rest of the world.

The first six songs of the album consist of Los Lobos covers of Ritchie Valens' songs: "La Bamba", "Come On, Let's Go!", "Ooh My Head", "We Belong Together", "Framed", and "Donna". Other performers include Howard Huntsberry (as Jackie Wilson), Marshall Crenshaw (as Buddy Holly), Brian Setzer (as Eddie Cochran), and Bo Diddley performing a new version of his blues classic "Who Do You Love?".

In 1988, a second soundtrack album was released, titled La Bamba Volume 2: More Music from the Original Motion Picture Soundtrack, featuring 12 songs by the original artists portrayed in the film.

== Track listing ==
All tracks are performed by Los Lobos, except where noted.

Side A
No.	Title	Writer(s)	Length
1.	"La Bamba"	Traditional (arranged by Ritchie Valens)	2:54
2.	"Come On, Let's Go!"	Valens	1:58
3.	"Ooh My Head"	Valens	1:43
4.	"We Belong Together"	Robert Carr; Johnny Mitchell; Hy Weiss	1:58
5.	"Framed"	Jerry Leiber; Mike Stoller	2:33
6.	"Donna"	Valens	2:19

Side B
No.	Title	Writer(s)	Artist(s)	Length
1.	"Lonely Teardrops"	Berry Gordy; Roquel "Billy" Davis; Gwendolyn Gordy	Howard Huntsberry	3:27
2.	"Crying, Waiting, Hoping"	Buddy Holly	Marshall Crenshaw	2:20
3.	"Summertime Blues"	Eddie Cochran; Jerry Capehart	Brian Setzer	2:40
4.	"Who Do You Love?"	Ellas Bates McDaniel	Bo Diddley	3:00
5.	"Charlena"	Herman B. Chaney; Manuel G. Chavez		2:45
6.	"Goodnight My Love"	George Motola; John Marascalco		3:16

== Charts ==
=== Weekly charts ===
Chart (1987–1988)	Peak position
Australian Albums (Kent Music Report)	2
Austrian Albums (Ö3 Austria)	7
Canadian Albums (The Record)	1
Dutch Albums (Album Top 100)	13
Dutch Albums (Stichting Nederlandse)	9
European Albums (Music and Media)	7
Finnish Albums (Suomen virallinen lista)	2
French Albums (IFOP)	1
German Albums (Offizielle Top 100)	30
Italian Albums (Billboard)	11
New Zealand Albums (RMNZ)	3
Norwegian Albums (VG-lista)	10
Spanish Albums (PROMUSICAE)	2
Swedish Albums (Sverigetopplistan)	13
Swiss Albums (Schweizer Hitparade)	3
UK Albums (OCC)	24
US Billboard 200	1
US Top 40 Compact Discs (Cashbox)	1
US Top 100 Albums (Cashbox)	1
US Top Compact Disks (Billboard)	1

=== Year-end charts ===
Chart (1987)	Position
Australian Albums (Kent Music Report)	38
Canadian Albums (RPM)	7
European Albums (Music and Media)	47
New Zealand Albums (RMNZ)	38
Swiss Albums (Schweizer Hitparade)	11
US Billboard 200	68
US Top Compact Disks (Billboard)	21
US Top Soundtrack Albums (Billboard)	2

Chart (1988)	Position
US Top Soundtrack Albums (Billboard)	47

== Certifications ==
Sales certifications and sales for La Bamba
Region	Certification	Certified units/sales
Australia	—	140,000
Brazil	—	254,000
Canada (Music Canada)	2× Platinum	200,000^{^}
France (SNEP)	Gold	100,000^{*}
Malaysia	—	17,000
New Zealand (RMNZ)	Gold	7,500^{^}
Spain (Promusicae)	Gold	50,000^{^}
Switzerland (IFPI Switzerland)	Gold	25,000^{^}
United Kingdom (BPI)	Gold	100,000^{^}
United States (RIAA)	2× Platinum	2,000,000^{^}
^{*} Sales figures based on certification alone.^{^} Shipments figures based on certification alone.
