= The Best of Ritchie Valens =

Compilation album by Ritchie Valens
- Released: 1981 (original); 1987 (reissue)
- Recorded: 1958–1959
- Genre: Rock and roll
- Label: Rhino Records RNDF-200 (1981 original); RNLP-70178 (1987 reissue)
- Producer: Robert Keane

Ritchie Valens chronology
History of Ritchie Valens (1981)	The Best of Ritchie Valens (1981)	Bob Keane Tells The Ritchie Valens Story (1987)

The Best of Ritchie Valens is a greatest hits package by Ritchie Valens.

In 1981, Rhino Records began issuing a number of compilations from Bob Keane's Del-Fi Records catalog. This compilation was a follow-up to the first release History of Ritchie Valens, a deluxe box set of Valens' original three Del-Fi albums.

Six years later, with the success of the Ritchie Valens bio movie La Bamba, along with Los Lobos' chart-topping version of the movie title track, the soundtrack album (which also peaked at #1), and even Los Lobos' version of "Come On, Let's Go" (charting higher than the original), a new generation of Ritchie Valens fans surged all over the nation, wanting to experience the music as presented by Valens himself. Rhino responded by reissuing The Best of Ritchie Valens as part of the label's Golden Archive Series compilations. The success of the LP brought Valens back to the album charts after a 27-year absence, peaking at #100. Rhino then reissued Valens' original three Del-Fi albums, which sold well but did not chart. It received a rating of 4.5 from AllMusic.

== Track listing ==
=== Side 1 ===
1. "La Bamba"
2. "Bluebirds Over the Mountain"
3. "In a Turkish Town"
4. "Ooh, My Head"
5. "The Paddi-Wack Song"
6. "Stay Beside Me"
7. "Malaguena"
8. "Framed" (bonus track on CD version)

=== Side 2 ===
1. "Come On, Let's Go"
2. "Donna"
3. "Fast Freight"
4. "We Belong Together"
5. "That's My Little Suzie"
6. "Hurry Up"
7. "Little Girl"
8. "Hi-Tone" (bonus track on CD version)
