= Ritchie Valens Memorial Album =

Compilation album by Ritchie Valens
- Released: December 1962
- Recorded: 1958–1959
- Genre: Rock and roll
- Length: 27:50
- Label: Del-Fi
- Producer: Robert Keane

Ritchie Valens chronology
Ritchie Valens In Concert at Pacoima Jr. High (1960)	Ritchie Valens Memorial Album (1962)	Ritchie Valens...His Greatest Hits Volume 2 (1964)

Professional ratings
Review scores
Source	Rating
Record Mirror	3/5 stars

Ritchie Valens Memorial Album is the first greatest hits compilation by Ritchie Valens, featuring his first three charted hits plus tracks from the previous three albums, released three years following his death in a plane crash. The original album was issued with a black album cover and the same photo of Valens from his second album Ritchie. A few months later, the album was retitled Ritchie Valens, His Greatest Hits and repackaged with a white album cover and a photo of Ritchie taken from his Del-Fi EP Ritchie Valens Sings. Both issues include the same back cover and album contents.

== Track listings ==
=== Side 1 ===
1. "Donna" (Ritchie Valens)
2. "We Belong Together" (Hy Weiss, Johnny Mitchell, Robert Carr)
3. "From Beyond" (Valens)
4. "Stay Beside Me" (Bill Olofson, Maurice Ellenhorn)
5. "Bluebirds Over the Mountain" (Ersel Hickey)
6. "In a Turkish Town" (Valens)

=== Side 2 ===
1. "Malaguena" (Ernesto Lecuona)
2. "La Bamba" (traditional, adapted by Ritchie Valens)
3. "Come On, Let's Go" (Valens)
4. "Rockin' All Night" (Valens)
5. "Cry, Cry, Cry" (Robert Kuhn)
6. "Hurry Up" (Sharon Sheeley)
