= Ritchie Valens in Concert at Pacoima Jr. High =

Live album and demo by Ritchie Valens
- Released: December 1960
- Recorded: December 10, 1958 (Concert); 1958–59 (Demos)
- Genre: Rock and roll
- Length: 30:08
- Label: Del-Fi
- Producer: Robert Keane

Ritchie Valens chronology
Ritchie (1959)	Ritchie Valens in Concert at Pacoima Jr. High (1960)	Ritchie Valens Memorial Album (1963)

Ritchie Valens in Concert at Pacoima Jr. High is a live album released posthumously and is the third and final of the released albums by Ritchie Valens. It consists of his only live performance ever recorded. The live recording is augmented by unfinished studio recordings.

== Background ==
On December 10, 1958, Valens, having completed a recent tour of Hawaii, gave a performance at his alma mater, Pacoima Junior High School. The show was emceed by Gail Smith, a close friend of his who later became president of the Ritchie Valens Memorial Fan Club in Los Angeles. Valens's guitar and vocals were accompanied only by drummer Don Phillips. The concert was taped using a small portable tape recorder.

After Valens's death on February 3, 1959, numerous Ritchie Valens Fan Clubs were formed all over the nation. By late 1960, with no further records released since the Ritchie album a year before, his manager Robert Keane received letters en masse from fan club members who were hoping there were more of Valens's songs to be released. Keane responded by obtaining the tape from the Pacoima Junior High show and pressing it to record. To fill the "live" side of the album, an early demo of "Come On, Let's Go", bearing no textual resemblance to the released "hit" version, was added with live audience dubbed in. As Valens' entire Gold Star Studios master output had been released on his first two albums, side two was filled with unfinished demos recorded at Keane's home studio. Keane provided narrative descriptions of each track.

Professional ratings
Review scores
Source	Rating
Allmusic	link

== Track listing ==
All tracks are written by Ritchie Valens, except where noted.

Side One (From the Pacoima Junior High School show)
No.	Title	Writer(s)	Length
1.	"Introduction by Bob Keane"		1:57
2.	"Come On, Let's Go"	Ritchie Valens, Robert Kuhn	3:20
3.	"Donna"		3:05
4.	"Summertime Blues"	Jerry Capehart, Eddie Cochran	2:58
5.	"From Beyond"		3:55
6.	"La Bamba"	Traditional; adapted by Ritchie Valens	4:37

Side Two (Unfinished demos with Bob Keane describing each track)
No.	Title	Writer(s)	Length
1.	"Introduction by Bob Keane"		0:20
2.	"Rhythm Song"		1:14
3.	"Guitar Instrumental"		1:54
4.	"Malaguena"	Marian Banks, Ernesto Lecuona	3:24
5.	"Rock Little Darling"	Ritchie Valens, Robert Kuhn	1:29
6.	"Let's Rock and Roll"		1:46

== Personnel ==
- Ritchie Valens – guitar, vocals
- Don Phillips – drums
