= Come On, Let's Go =

1958 single by Ritchie Valens

Single by Ritchie Valens

from the album Ritchie Valens
- B-side: "Framed"
- Released: May 1958
- Recorded: 1958
- Studio: Gold Star (Los Angeles, California)
- Genre: Rock and roll
- Length: 1:50
- Label: Del-Fi
- Songwriter: Ritchie Valens

Ritchie Valens singles chronology
"Come On, Let's Go" (1958)	"Donna" / "La Bamba" (1958)

"Come On, Let's Go"

Single by The McCoys

from the album You Make Me Feel So Good
- B-side: "Little People"
- Released: April 1966
- Recorded: 1966
- Genre: Rock and roll
- Length: 2:38
- Label: Bang
- Songwriter: Ritchie Valens

The McCoys singles chronology
"Up and Down" (1966)	"Come On, Let's Go" (1966)	"(You Make Me Feel) So Good" (1966)

"Come On, Let's Go" is a song written and originally recorded by Ritchie Valens in 1958. It was the first of four charting singles from his self-titled debut album, and reached number 42 on the U.S. Billboard Hot 100 in May 1958.

== Cover versions ==
British teen idol Tommy Steele covered "Come On, Let's Go" shortly after Valens' hit was released in the U.S. His version reached number 10 in the United Kingdom.

American rock group The McCoys recorded "Come On, Let's Go" and included it on their 1966 album You Make Me Feel So Good. Also released as a single, it reached the Top 40 on the U.S. and Canadian charts.

The Ramones and The Paley Brothers recorded a cover of the song in 1977, which appeared on the soundtrack to the Ramones' film Rock 'n' Roll High School. It was the last Ramones recording to feature Tommy Ramone on drums.

Los Lobos covered the song in 1987 for the soundtrack of the 1987 Ritchie Valens biographical movie La Bamba starring Lou Diamond Phillips. Their version reached number 18 in the United Kingdom and number 21 in the U.S. It was also a track on Cars: The Video Game.

Japanese experimental music group The Gerogerigegege recorded the song and included it on their 1990 album Tokyo Anal Dynamite.

American indie rock band Girl In a Coma recorded their version of "Come On, Let's Go" for the 2010 album Adventures in Coverland.

== Chart history ==
Ritchie Valens
Chart (1958)	Peak position	Ref(s)
US Billboard Hot 100	42	
US Cash Box Top 100	51	

Tommy Steele
Chart (1958–59)	Peak position	Ref(s)
UK Singles (OCC)	10	

The McCoys
Chart (1966)	Peak position	Ref(s)
Canada Top Singles (RPM)	36	
US Billboard Hot 100	22	
US Cash Box Top 100	17	

Los Lobos
Chart (1987–88)	Peak position	Ref(s)
Canada Top Singles (RPM)	25	
Ireland (Irish Singles Chart)	9	
UK Singles (OCC)	18	
South Africa (Springbok)	15	
US Billboard Hot 100	21	
US Adult Contemporary (Billboard)	35	
US Cash Box Top 100	24	
