= Ritchie Valens...His Greatest Hits Volume 2 =

Compilation album by Ritchie Valens
- Released: 1964
- Recorded: 1958–1959
- Genre: Rock and roll
- Length: 25:58
- Label: Del-Fi
- Producer: Robert Keane

Ritchie Valens chronology
| Ritchie Valens Memorial Album (1963) | Ritchie Valens...His Greatest Hits Volume 2 (1964) | History of Ritchie Valens (1981) |

Ritchie Valens...His Greatest Hits Volume 2 is the second greatest hits compilation by Ritchie Valens. This follow-up to the Ritchie Valens Memorial Album/His Greatest Hits includes twelve tracks from the three original albums. Three tracks were previously issued on the first greatest hits package: "Donna", "La Bamba" and "Cry, Cry, Cry".

This compilation has two pressing errors:

- Side 2, track 6 was pressed with "Rockin' All Night" (already on the first compilation) instead of Valens' last charted record, "Little Girl", as shown on the back cover and record label. This confusion may have come from the "little girl" lyric mentioned several times at the beginning of "Rockin' All Night".
- "Cry, Cry, Cry" and "Now You're Gone" (each side's fifth track) are shown on the cover and record labels in reverse. The former appears on Side 2 and vice versa.

The record's labels and back cover show the title of the compilation as La Bamba.

This was also the last Ritchie Valens album issued on the first-run Del-Fi label, which ceased operations in 1967.

== Track listings ==
=== Side 1 ===
1. "La Bamba" (Traditional; adapted by Ritchie Valens)
2. "That's My Little Susie" (Valens, Robert Kuhn)
3. "Ooh! My Head" (Valens)
4. "Let's Rock and Roll" (Valens)
5. "Now You're Gone" (erroneously listed as "Cry, Cry, Cry") (Valens)
6. "Bonie Maronie" (Larry Williams)

=== Side 2 ===
1. "Donna" (Valens)
2. "Rock 'Lil Darlin'" (Valens, Kuhn)
3. "Dooby Dooby Wah" (Valens, Kuhn)
4. "Framed" (Jerry Leiber, Mike Stoller)
5. "Cry, Cry, Cry" (erroneously listed as "Now You're Gone") (Valens, Kuhn)
6. "Rockin' All Night" (erroneously listed as "Little Girl") (Valens)
