= Ritchie Valens (album) =

Studio album by Ritchie Valens
- Released: February 12, 1959
- Recorded: 1958–59, Gold Star Studios, Los Angeles, California, U.S.
- Genre: Rock and roll
- Length: 25:15
- Label: Del-Fi
- Producer: Robert Keane

Ritchie Valens chronology
Ritchie Valens (1959)	Ritchie (1959)

Singles from Ritchie Valens
- 1. "Come On, Let's Go" Released: May 1958; 2. "Donna / La Bamba" Released: October 1958; 3. "That's My Little Suzie" Released: January 1959

Ritchie Valens is the debut album by American musician Ritchie Valens, released by Del-Fi Records on February 12, 1959, nine days following his death from a plane crash. It is his only studio album entirely composed of master tracks recorded at Gold Star Studios in Los Angeles. The album peaked at #23 on the US Billboard album chart.

The LP yielded four U.S. chart singles: "Come On, Let's Go" (#42), "Donna" (#2), "La Bamba" (#22), and "That's My Little Suzie" (#55).

The original pressings are black and sea green with circles around the outer edge. The print font for the track listings on these labels is the same font used on the back of the album cover. Later pressings feature black labels with gold and sea green diamonds around the outer edge. The album has been reissued over the years, featuring different album covers.

Professional ratings
Review scores
Source	Rating
Allmusic	link

== Track listing ==
Side 1

1. "That's My Little Suzie" (Ritchie Valens, Robert Kuhn) – 1:52

- Original album covers show the title as "I Got A Gal Named Sue", corrected on later pressings

2. "In a Turkish Town" (Valens) – 2:16
3. "Come On, Let's Go" (Valens) – 2:00
4. "Donna" (Valens) – 2:28
5. "Boney-Moronie" (Larry Williams) – 2:46
6. "Ooh, My Head" (Valens) – 1:48

Side 2

7. "La Bamba" (Traditional; adapted by Ritchie Valens) – 2:06
8. "Bluebirds Over the Mountain" (Ersel Hickey) – 1:45
9. "Hi-Tone" (Al Hazan) – 2:06
10. "Framed" (Jerry Leiber, Mike Stoller) – 2:13
11. "We Belong Together" (Robert Carr, Johnny Mitchell, Hy Weiss) – 1:57
12. "Dooby-Dooby-Wah" (Valens, Kuhn) – 1:53

== Charts ==
=== Album ===
Chart (1959)	Peak position
Billboard Pop Albums (Billboard 200)	23
