= Ritchie Valens =

American rock musician (1941–1959)

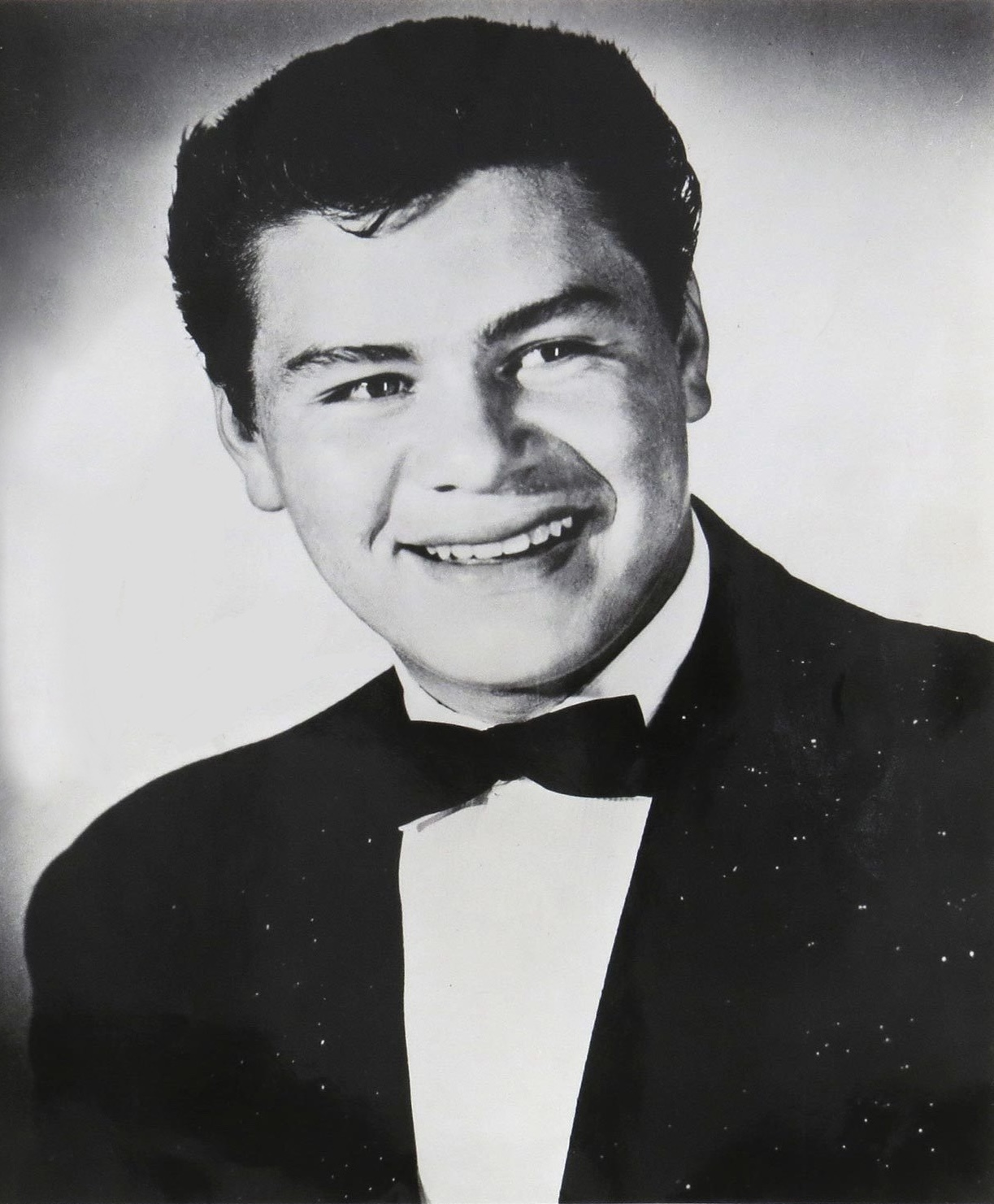
- Valens in 1958
- Born: Richard Steven Valenzuela; May 13, 1941; San Fernando Valley, California, U.S.
- Died: February 3, 1959 (aged 17); Grant Township, Iowa, U.S.
- Cause of death: Blunt trauma as a result of a plane accident
- Resting place: San Fernando Mission Cemetery
- Other names: Ritchie Valens, Arvee Allens
- Occupations: Musician; songwriter
- Years active: 1957–1959
- Musical career
- Genres: Rock and roll; Chicano rock
- Instruments: Guitar; vocals
- Website: www.ritchievalens.com

Richard Steven Valenzuela (May 13, 1941 – February 3, 1959), better known by his stage name Ritchie Valens, was an American guitarist, singer, and songwriter. A rock and roll pioneer and a forefather of the Chicano rock movement, Valens died in a plane crash just eight months after his breakthrough.

Valens had several hits, most notably "La Bamba", which he had adapted from a Mexican folk song. Valens transformed the song into one with a rock rhythm and beat, and it became a hit in 1958, making Valens a pioneer of the Spanish-speaking rock and roll movement. He also had an American number-two hit with "Donna".

On February 3, 1959, on what has become known as "The Day the Music Died", Valens died in a plane crash in Iowa, an accident that also claimed the lives of fellow musicians Buddy Holly and J. P. "The Big Bopper" Richardson, as well as pilot Roger Peterson. Valens was 17 years old at the time of his death. His eponymous debut album was released nine days later and his second album Ritchie was released later that year in October. He was posthumously inducted into the Rock and Roll Hall of Fame, the Rockabilly Hall of Fame, the Native American Music Awards Hall of Fame, the California Hall of Fame, and has a star on the Hollywood Walk of Fame.

== Early life ==
Valens was born as Richard Steven Valenzuela on May 13, 1941, in Pacoima, a neighborhood in the San Fernando Valley region of Los Angeles. His parents were from the town of Vícam, Sonora, and were both of Yaqui Native Mexican descent, having immigrated to the United States in search of a better life. Although Valenzuela is not a Yaqui surname, many Indigenous Mexican families adopted it during the Porfiriato dictatorship to avoid forcible removal from their lands, similar to the case of Fernando Valenzuela, who was of Mayo Native Mexican descent.

Valenzuela was brought up hearing traditional Mexican mariachi music, as well as flamenco guitar, R&B, and jump blues. He expressed an interest in making music of his own by the age of five. Valenzuela was encouraged by his father to take up guitar and trumpet, and later taught himself the drums. Though Valenzuela was left-handed, he was so eager to learn the guitar that he mastered the traditional right-handed version of the instrument.

Valenzuela was a 15-year-old student at Pacoima Junior High School at the time of the 1957 Pacoima mid-air collision. He was not at school that day since he was attending his grandfather's funeral. Recurring nightmares of the disaster led to Valens's fear of flying.

By the time Valenzuela was attending Pacoima Junior High School (now Pacoima Middle School), he would bring his guitar to school and sing and play songs to his friends on the bleachers. When Valenzuela was 16 years old, he was invited to join a local band, The Silhouettes (not to be confused with the group of the same name famous for its hit song "Get a Job"). Valenzuela began as a guitarist, and when the main vocalist left the group, he took over the position. On June 19, 1957, Valenzuela made his performing debut with The Silhouettes.

Valenzuela also attended San Fernando High School.

== Career ==
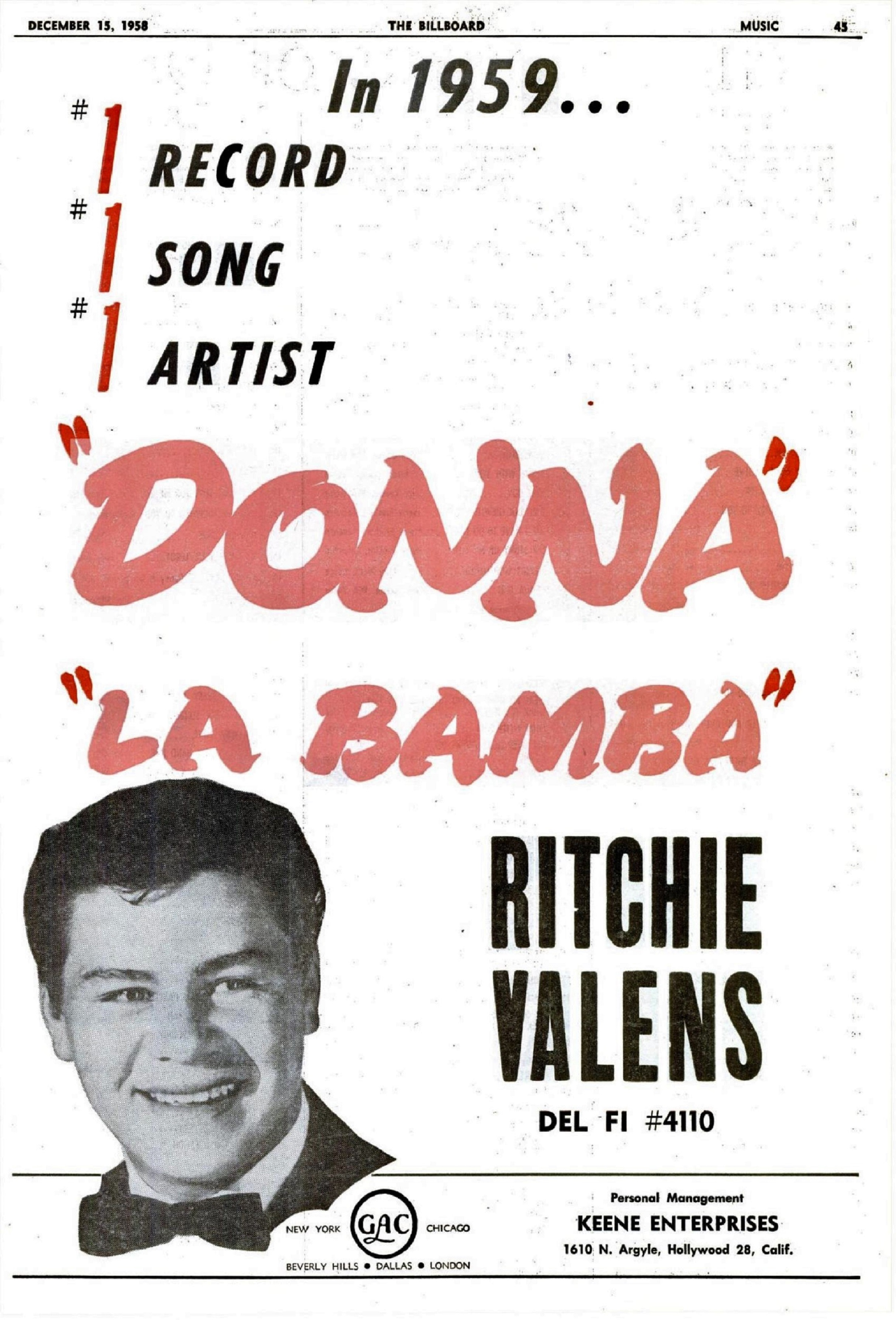
Billboard advertisement, December 15, 1958

A self-taught musician, Valenzuela was an accomplished singer and guitarist. At his appearances, Valenzuela often improvised new lyrics and added new riffs to popular songs while he was playing.

Bob Keane, the owner and president of small record label Del-Fi Records in Hollywood, was given a tip in May 1958 by San Fernando High School student Doug Macchia about a young performer from Pacoima by the name of Richard Valenzuela. Kids knew the performer as "the Little Richard of San Fernando". Swayed by the Little Richard comparison, Keane went to see Valenzuela play a Saturday-morning matinée at a movie theater in San Fernando. Impressed by the performance, he invited Valenzuela to audition at his home in the Silver Lake area of Los Angeles, where he had a small recording studio in his basement. His recording equipment comprised an early stereo recorder (a two-track Ampex 601-2 portable) and a pair of Neumann U-47 condenser microphones. After this first audition, Keane signed Valenzuela to Del-Fi on May 14, 1958. At this point, the musician took the name "Ritchie" because, as Keane said, "There were a bunch of 'Richards' around at that time, and I wanted it to be different." Similarly, Keane recommended shortening his surname to "Valens" from Valenzuela to widen his appeal beyond any obvious ethnic group. Valens was ready to enter the studio with a full band backing him. The musicians included René Hall, Carol Kaye, and Earl Palmer. The first songs recorded at Gold Star Studios, at a single studio session one afternoon in May 1958, were "Come On, Let's Go", an original, credited to Valens/Kuhn (Keane's real name), and "Framed", a Leiber and Stoller tune. Pressed and released within days of the recording session, the record was a success. Valens' next record, a double A-side, had the song "Donna" (written about a real girlfriend Donna Ludwig) coupled with "La Bamba". It sold over one million copies, and was awarded a gold disc by the Recording Industry Association of America.

By the autumn of 1958, the demands of Valens's career forced him to drop out of high school. Keane booked appearances at venues across the United States and performances on television programs.

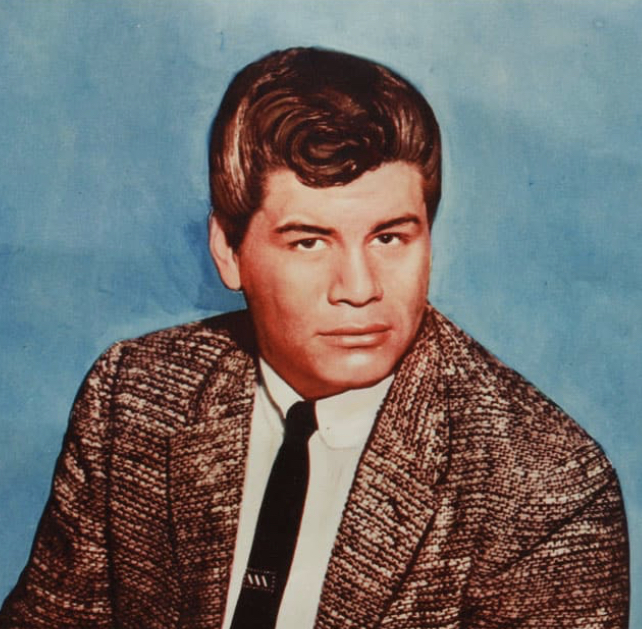
Valens in 1959

=== Concerts and appearances (late 1958–early 1959) ===
On October 6, 1958, Valens made his first appearance on Dick Clark's American Bandstand singing "Come On, Let's Go". Soon after, Valens traveled to Honolulu, Hawaii, to perform under the banner of the "11th Show of Stars". On December 10, 1958, after his trip to Honolulu, Valens made an appearance back at Pacoima Junior High School (now Pacoima Middle School). This concert was posthumously released as Ritchie Valens in Concert at Pacoima Jr. High; it was Valens' only live performance ever recorded. In mid-December 1958, Valens left for New York City. Keane had managed to book him as a late addition to "Alan Freed's Christmas Jubilee Show" where Valens performed with The Everly Brothers, Bo Diddley, Chuck Berry, Jackie Wilson, Eddie Cochran and others. On December 27, Valens performed "Donna" on The Dick Clark Show. He played a few more shows in New York, including a show at the famous Apollo Theater. On January 17, 1959, he appeared at West Covina High School with Sam Cooke for a student organized fundraiser called "The Teen Canteen Foundation".

== Personal life ==
Valens was in a relationship with Donna Ludwig, his high school sweetheart, from 1957 until his death. Ludwig started dating Valens despite strenuous objections from her father and she would have to secretly leave her home from her bedroom window in order to rendezvous with Valens. Valens's song "Donna" was written for her. Their relationship became strained due to Valens' increasing popularity and touring. After his death, Elvis Presley had one of his bodyguards arrange a date with Ludwig so that he could know all about Valens. In 1987, she attended the premiere of La Bamba, a biopic featuring the life and career of Valens.

A woman named Diane Olson attended Valens’ funeral and claimed to Valens's family that they had been engaged. Olson allegedly lived with Valens’ sister for several months before disappearing and never contacting his family again.

== Winter Dance Party tour and death (1959) ==
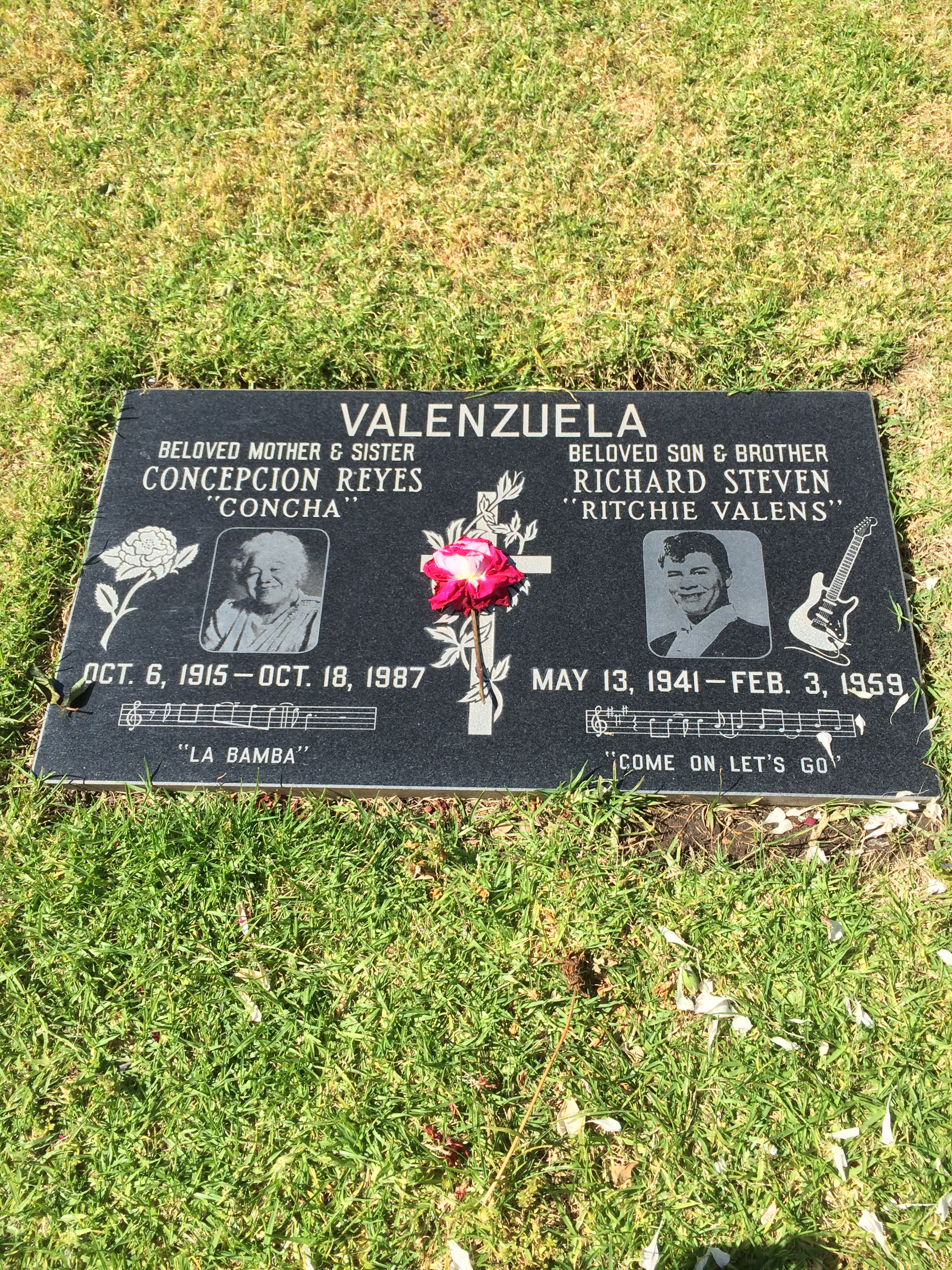
Grave of Valens and his mother at San Fernando Mission Cemetery

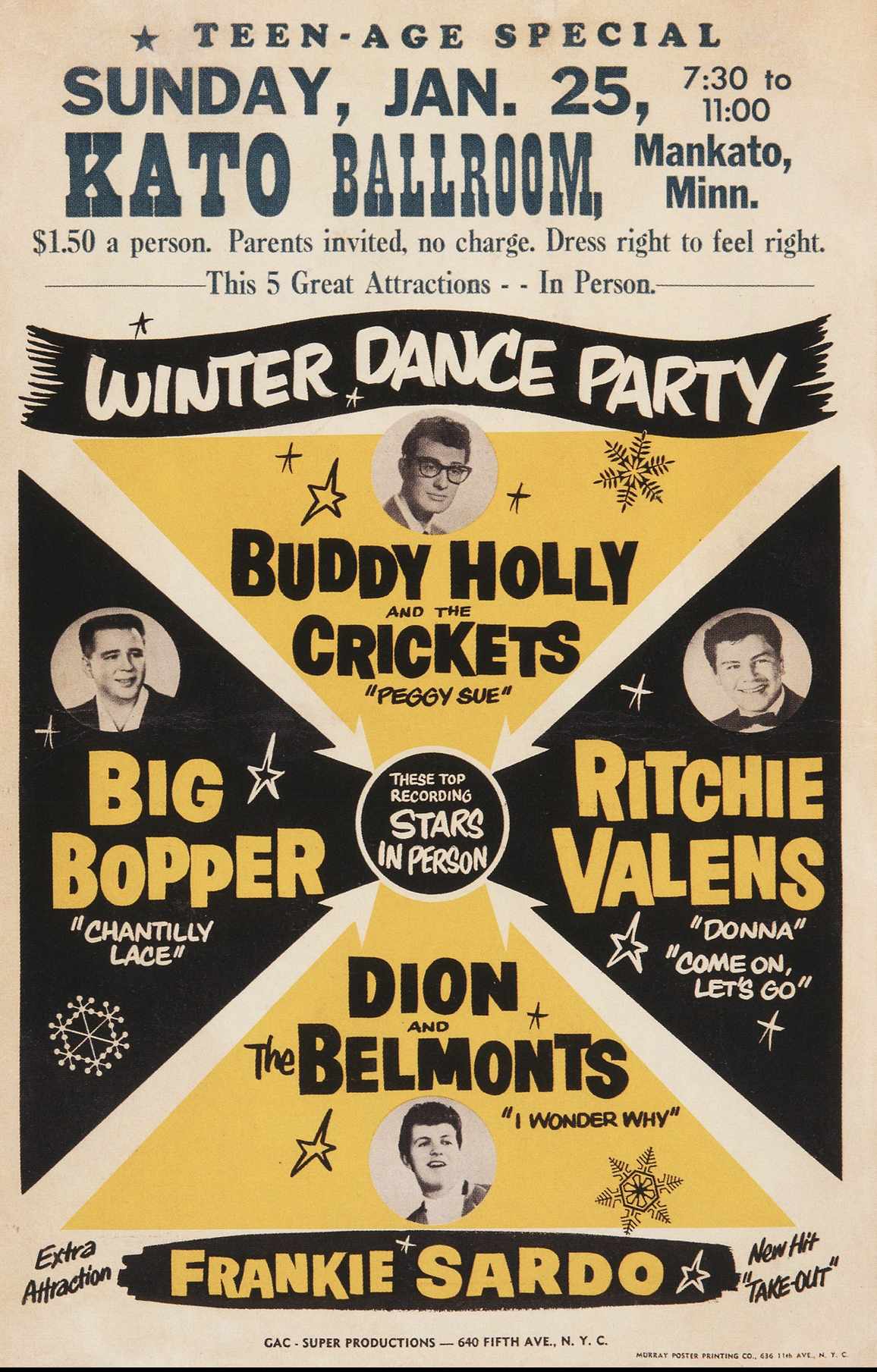
Poster for the "Winter Dance Party" tour

Valens was one of the five acts billed for the Winter Dance Party tour, performing with Buddy Holly, "The Big Bopper" J. P. Richardson, Dion and the Belmonts, and Frankie Sardo beginning on January 23, 1959, in Milwaukee, Wisconsin. The tour was plagued by subzero temperatures and numerous logistical problems. The unheated tour buses twice broke down in freezing weather, with Valens and Richardson experiencing flu-like symptoms throughout the tour. After the bus stalled in Duluth, Minnesota on January 31, conditions were so bad that Holly's drummer, Carl Bunch, was hospitalized for severe frostbite sustained on the bus. To fill in for Bunch, Holly, Valens, and Carlo Mastrangelo of The Belmonts all took turns drumming for one another.

After the February 2, 1959, performance in Clear Lake, Iowa (which ended around midnight), Holly, Richardson, and Valens flew out of the Mason City airport in a small plane that Holly had chartered. Valens was on the plane since he won a coin toss with Holly's backup guitarist Tommy Allsup. Bob Hale, a disc jockey with Mason City's KRIB-AM, was emceeing the concert that night and flipped the coin in the ballroom's side-stage room shortly before the musicians departed for the airport. Valens is apocryphally said to have remarked, "That's the first time I've ever won anything in my life." Waylon Jennings, who was performing as Holly's bass guitarist, voluntarily gave up his seat on the plane to J.P. Richardson, who was ill with the flu.

At around 12:55 a.m. on February 3, 1959, the four-passenger Beechcraft Bonanza, (N3794N), departed for Fargo, North Dakota, and crashed a few minutes after takeoff. The cause was apparently loss of control by the pilot Roger Peterson, who was not qualified for the deteriorating weather. The crash killed all four men instantly upon impact. As with Holly, Richardson and Peterson, Valens suffered massive fatal head injuries along with blunt-force trauma to the chest. At the age of 17, Valens was the youngest to die in the crash.

The tragedy inspired singer Don McLean to write his 1971 hit "American Pie", immortalizing February 3 as "The Day the Music Died". Valens was buried at San Fernando Mission Cemetery in Mission Hills, Los Angeles, California.

== Legacy ==
Valens was a pioneer of Chicano rock and Latin rock, inspiring many musicians of Mexican heritage. He influenced the likes of Los Lobos, Los Lonely Boys, and Carlos Santana, as Valens had become nationally successful at a time when very few Latinos were in American rock and pop music. He is considered the first Latino to successfully cross over into mainstream rock.

However, Valens's aunt Ernestine Reyes said "he didn't know Spanish at all" and needed help remembering and understanding the song's traditional lyrics. His limited command of Spanish was also confirmed by manager Bob Keane. Valens learned the lyrics phonetically to record "La Bamba" in Spanish.

"La Bamba" proved to be his most influential recording, not only by becoming a pop chart hit sung entirely in Spanish, but also because of its successful blending of traditional Latin American music with rock. Valens was the first to capitalize on this formula, which was later adopted by such varied artists as Carlos Santana, Selena, Caifanes, Café Tacuba, Circo, El Gran Silencio, Aterciopelados, Gustavo Santaolalla, and many others in the Latin alternative scene.

Valens version of "La Bamba" was selected by the U.S. Library of Congress for preservation in the National Recording Registry as "culturally, historically, and aesthetically significant".

Los Lobos was nominated for a Grammy Award for Record of the Year in 1988 for their recording of "La Bamba" for the biopic.

In 2015, Billboard magazine listed Valens on its list of the 30 most influential Latino artists in history, citing "the influence of the Rock and Roll Hall of Famer lives on in today's Latin alternative artists" and also citing "the pioneering Latino artists's enduring crossover hit "La Bamba" proved early on that Mexican-rooted music and Spanish lyrics appealed to the mainstream".

Valens's mother, Concha, who died in 1987, is buried alongside him.

== Representation in other media ==
- Valens has been the subject of several biopic films, including the 1987 film La Bamba. Primarily set between 1957–1959, it depicted Valens from age 16 to 17. It introduced Lou Diamond Phillips as Valens. Los Lobos performed most of the music in the film.
- Valens was portrayed by Gilbert Melgar in the final scene of the 1978 film The Buddy Holly Story.
- Lil' Libros released a picture book based on Valens' life in 2019.
- On August 26, 2024, it was announced that a new biopic was in the works. The movie will be released through Mucho Mas Media and Sony Pictures with Luis Valdez, the writer and director of the original 1987 film, serving as an executive producer along with writer José Rivera attached to write the script.

== Tributes ==
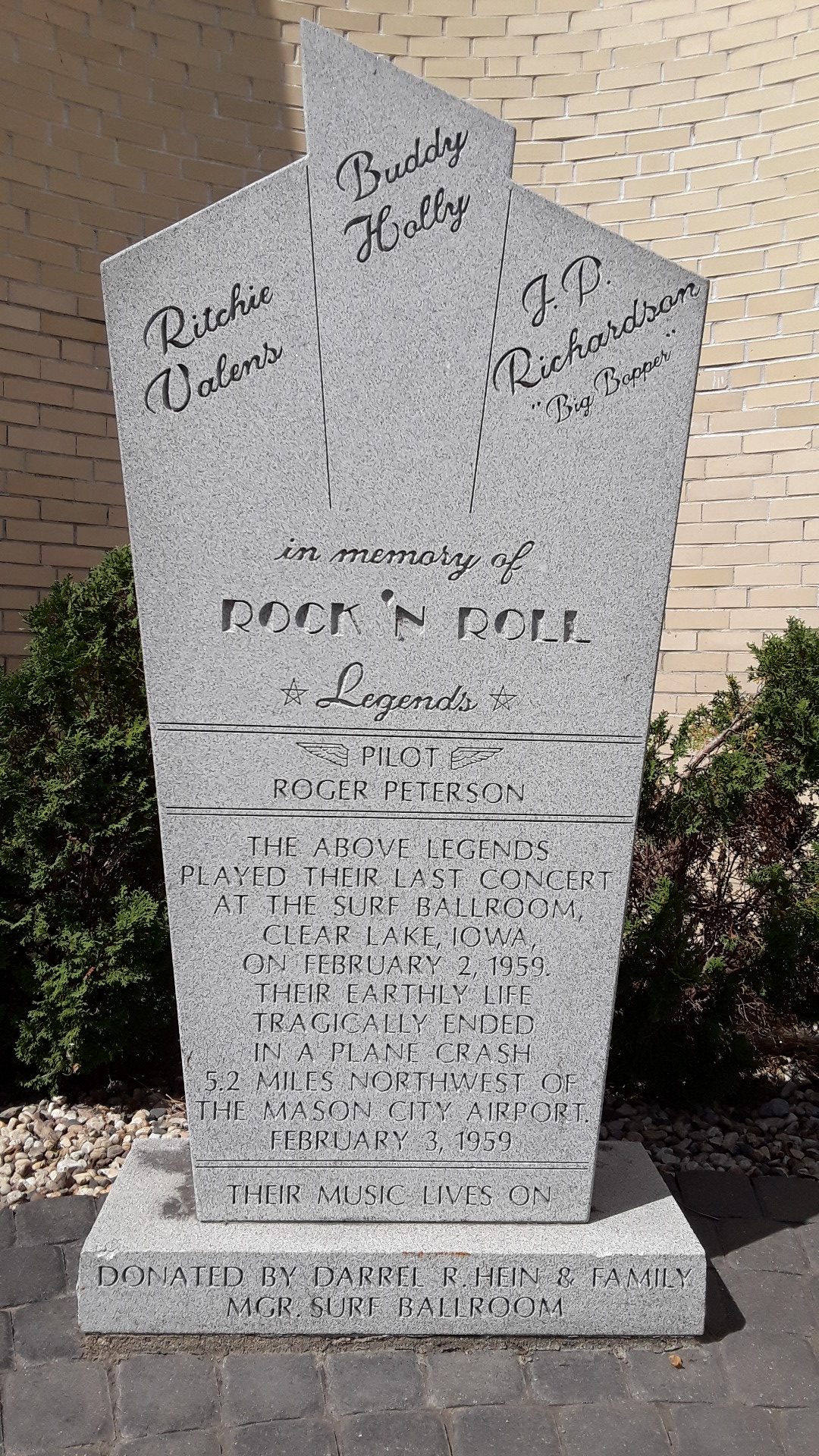
Monument in front of Surf Ballroom in Clear Lake, Iowa

In 1989, Ken Paquette, a Wisconsin fan of the 1950s era, erected a stainless-steel monument depicting a guitar and a set of three records bearing the names of each of the three performers killed in the accident. It is located on private farmland, about 1.25 miles (2.01 km) west of the intersection of 315th Street and Gull Avenue, about 8 miles (13 km) north of Clear Lake. He also created a similar stainless-steel monument to the three musicians that was installed near the Riverside Ballroom in Green Bay, Wisconsin. That memorial was unveiled on July 17, 2003.

Paxton Park in Pacoima was renamed Ritchie Valens Recreation Center in memory of Valens in the 1990s. There is also a pool nearby named the Ritchie Valens Pool. At the recreation center, there is also a skatepark named Ritchie Valens Skate Plaza. A city council member representing Pacoima proposed the renaming to honor Valens so residents would "remember his humble background and emulate his accomplishments."

Musician Tommy Allsup started a club, "Tommy's Heads Up Saloon", in Dallas in 1979. The club was named for the fateful coin toss between Valens and him twenty years prior.

"Boogie with Stu" from Led Zeppelin's Physical Graffiti album was inspired by Valens' song "Ooh, My Head". It did not credit Valens or Bob Keane, instead crediting Valens' mother. Eventually, a lawsuit was filed by Keane, and half of the award went to Valens' mother, although she was not part of the suit.

On May 11, 1990, a star bearing Valens' name was unveiled on the Hollywood Walk of Fame. The star cost $3,500, which was paid for with money raised in his name by family and friends. His star permanently resides at 6733 Hollywood Boulevard in front of Artisan's Patio mini mall.

On February 2, 2009, Surf Ballroom held a 50th anniversary honoring the last concert of Buddy Holly, J.P. "The Big Bopper" Richardson, and Valens. The event lasted one week and had performances that honored the memories of the three men. Family members and friends of the stars made appearances.

Many murals have been painted around Pacoima in honor of the late Valens. In 1985, artist Manuel Velasquez (assisted by 25 students) created a 12 by 20 ft (4 by 6 m) mural, which was painted on the side of a classroom building at the former Pacoima Junior High (now Pacoima Middle School) depicting Valens's image, records labeled with some of his greatest hits, and the newspaper article about the plane crash that took his life. Another mural went up in 2012 at the intersection of Van Nuys Boulevard and Amboy Avenue, which was painted by Hector Ponce. A second one was painted in 2012 by Levi Ponce and is located on Van Nuys Boulevard and Telfair Avenue. A monument has also been built as a tribute. It was put on display in 2013, and is located at Ritchie Valens Park at 10731 Laurel Canyon Boulevard.

On May 13, 2016, what would have been Valens' 75th birthday, the Los Angeles City Council declared May 13 "Ritchie Valens Day".

A section of the Interstate 5 Freeway in the northeast San Fernando Valley has been named after Valens. The Ritchie Valens Memorial Highway is located between the 170 and 118 freeways. On August 25, 2018, a celebration was held in his honor to commemorate his legacy. The unveiling ceremony was held at Ritchie Valens Park, located at 10731 Laurel Canyon Boulevard in Pacoima. Replicas of the freeway sign were revealed at the celebration. The event was open to the public and free to attend. A few relatives of Valens played live performances as a tribute to the late singer. Leaders from the community and state gathered for the festivities.

In May 2022, the United States Post Office in Pacoima, California was renamed the Ritchie Valens Post Office in honor of Valens.

== Discography ==
=== Studio albums ===
List of albums, with US chart positions
Title	Album details	Peak chart positions
Title	Album details	US
Ritchie Valens	Released: February 1959; Format: LP; Label: Del-Fi DFLP-1201	23
Ritchie	Released: October 1959; Format: LP; Label: Del-Fi DFLP-1206	—

=== Live albums ===
Title	Album details
In Concert at Pacoima Jr. High	Released: December 1960; Format: LP; Label: Del-Fi DFLP-1214

=== Main compilation albums ===
Title	Album details
Ritchie Valens Memorial Album / (His Greatest Hits)	Released: December 1962; Format: LP; Label: Del-Fi DFLP-1225
His Greatest Hits Volume 2	Released: 1964; Format: LP; Label: Del-Fi DFLP-1247
History of Ritchie Valens	Released: 1981; Format: 3x LP; Label: Rhino RNBC 2798; Contains replicas of the three original albums
The Best of Ritchie Valens	Released: 1981; LP reissued: 1986; CD released: 1991; Format: LP; Label: Del-Fi/Rhino RNDF 200; RNLP 70178; RNCD 70178
The Ritchie Valens Story	Released: 1993; Format: CD; Label: Del-Fi/Rhino R2 71414; Features greatest hits, unreleased demos and 21-minute narrative of Ritchie's life story by Bob Keane
Rockin' All Night: The Very Best of Ritchie Valens	Released: 1995; Format: CD; Label: Del-Fi DFCD 9001
Come On, Let's Go!	Released: 1999; Format: CD Boxed Set; Label: Del-Fi DFBX 2359; Contains 3 CDs, 64-page booklet, and a folded poster

- Note: There are numerous Valens compilation albums.

=== Singles ===
Year	Titles (b/w indicates B-side track) Both sides from same album except where indicated	Record label	Peak chart positions			Album
Year	Titles (b/w indicates B-side track) Both sides from same album except where indicated	Record label	US Billboard	US Cashbox	AUS	Album
1958	"Come On, Let's Go" b/w "Framed"	Del-Fi 4106	42	51	53	Ritchie Valens
1958	"Donna" / "La Bamba"	Del-Fi 4110	2; 22	2; 49	4	Ritchie Valens
1959	"Fast Freight" b/w "Big Baby Blues"; Original pressings shown as "Arvee Allens"; later pressings shown as "Ritchie Valens"	Del-Fi 4111	—	—	—N/a	Ritchie
1959	"That's My Little Suzie" b/w "In a Turkish Town"	Del-Fi 4114	55	43	—N/a	Ritchie Valens
1959	"Little Girl" b/w "We Belong Together" (from Ritchie Valens)	Del-Fi 4117	92	93	—N/a	Ritchie
1959	"Stay Beside Me"	Del-Fi 4128	—	—	—N/a	Ritchie
1960	"The Paddiwack Song" b/w "Cry, Cry, Cry"; The above three singles were issued on gold Valens Memorial Series labels. Del-Fi 4117 was also issued with picture sleeve.	Del-Fi 4133	—	—	—N/a	Ritchie
1987	"La Bamba '87" b/w "La Bamba" (original version from Ritchie Valens)	Del-Fi 1287	—	—	89	Non-album track
1998	"Come On, Let's Go" b/w "La Bamba"	Del-Fi 51341	—	—	—	Come On, Let's Go!

== Filmography and TV appearances ==
- Go, Johnny, Go! (1959), was his only film appearance. He plays in a scene, after being introduced by Chuck Berry, singing "Ooh My Head". Valens died shortly after filming it.
- American Bandstand (6 October 1958), TV show hosted by Dick Clark.
- The Dick Clark Show (27 December 1958), TV show hosted by Dick Clark.

== See also ==
- List of acts who appeared on American Bandstand

== Sources ==
- Everitt, Rich (2004). Falling Stars: Air Crashes That Filled Rock and Roll Heaven. Harbor House. ISBN 978-1-891799-04-4.
