= Their Greatest Hits =

Their Greatest Hits may refer to:

- Their Greatest Hits (Hot Chocolate album), 1993
- Their Greatest Hits (The Police album), 1990
- Their Greatest Hits: The Record, 2001 album by the Bee Gees
- Their Greatest Hits (1971–1975), 1976 album by Eagles
