= Her Greatest Hits =

Her Greatest Hits may refer to:

- Her Greatest Hits (Jo Stafford album)
- Her Greatest Hits (Belinda Carlisle album)
- Her Greatest Hits: Songs of Long Ago, by Carole King
- Tina! Her Greatest Hits, by Tina Turner
- I Honestly Love You – Her Greatest Hits, by Olivia Newton-John
- Waiting for Saturday Night – Her Greatest Hits, by Whigfield
