= Diana: Paul Anka Sings His Greatest Hits =

Compilation album by Paul Anka
- Released: 1969
- Genre: Pop
- Label: RCA International (Camden)

Paul Anka chronology
Three Great Guys (1963)	Diana: Paul Anka Sings His Greatest Hits (1969)	Anka’ (1974)

Diana: Paul Anka Sings His Greatest Hits is a compilation album by Canadian-American singer-songwriter Paul Anka, released in 1969 by RCA International (Camden) Records.

== Track listing ==
All tracks composed by Paul Anka.

Side 1

1. "Diana"
2. "Put Your Head on My Shoulder"
3. "Lonely Boy"
4. "Time to Cry"
5. "I Love You in the Same Old Way"
6. "You Are My Destiny"
7. "Crazy Love"
8. "Don't Ever Leave Me"

Side 2

1. "Adam and Eve"
2. "I Love You, Baby"
3. "Tonight My Love, Tonight"
4. "My Home Town"
5. "Cinderella"
6. "Love Land"
7. "Dance On Little Girl"
8. "The Longest Day"

== Production ==
- Orchestra arranged and conducted by Joe Sherman
