= Donna (Ritchie Valens song) =

Single by Ritchie Valens

from the album Ritchie Valens
- B-side: "La Bamba"
- Released: September 1958
- Recorded: September 16, 1958
- Studio: Gold Star (Los Angeles, California)
- Genre: Rock and roll, doo wop
- Length: 2:20
- Label: Del-Fi 4110
- Songwriter: Ritchie Valens

Ritchie Valens singles chronology
"Come On, Let's Go" / "Framed" (1958)	"Donna" / "La Bamba" (1958)	"Fast Freight" / "Big Baby Blues" (1959)

"Donna" is a song written by Ritchie Valens, The song was released in 1958 on Del-Fi Records. Written as a love song to his high school sweetheart Donna Ludwig, it was Valens' highest-charting single, reaching No. 2 on the Billboard Hot 100 chart the following year. ("Stagger Lee" by Lloyd Price was at number one.)

== Valens' version ==
The song was recorded on September 16, 1958, at the Gold Star Studios in Los Angeles. Bob Keene is listed as having been the leader of the session, which included Earl Palmer on drums; Buddy Clark on bass; and Valens, Rene Hall, Irving Ashby, and Carol Kaye on guitars.

"Donna", the second Ritchie Valens single released, was the A side of the influential song "La Bamba". This single was only one of four, along with the previous single ("Come On, Let's Go"/"Framed" – Del-Fi 4106) and the follow-up ("Fast Freight"/"Big Baby Blues" — Del-Fi 4111) and ("That's My Little Suzie"/"In a Turkish Town – Del-Fi 4114) ever released in Valens' lifetime. Original Del-Fi pressings of "Donna"/"La Bamba" include black and sea green labels with circles, later replaced with solid sea green or solid dark green labels. Early 1960s pressings have black labels with sea green "sawtooth" outer edge.

Valens' version was positioned at No. 3 on the Billboard Hot 100 pop singles in October 1958. Three weeks before Valens' death, the song peaked at No. 2. On the Hot R&B Sides chart, "Donna" went to No. 11.

=== Chart performance ===
==== All-time charts ====
Chart (1958–2018)	Position
US Billboard Hot 100	3

== Other versions ==
- The song was notably covered by Los Lobos for the soundtrack to the 1987 film La Bamba which portrayed the life story of Ritchie Valens. In one scene, Valens is shown singing it to his girlfriend Donna Ludwig on the telephone and in another scene Valens is shown recording the song in the recording studio, and in a third scene he is shown performing the song on American Bandstand. Stourbridge (UK) band Stormboys (previously known as Kayran Dache) also released a version in Europe around the same time. Despite national radio plays it was outsold by the Los Lobos version that went Top 30 in France and Belgium and to #83 in the UK.
- Donny Osmond covered the song in 1972 on the album Too Young.
- Punk rock band MxPx covered the song on their album Let It Happen.
- Gary Glitter covered the song in 1972 on the album Glitter.
- It was a #3 UK hit in May 1959 for Marty Wilde.
- Cliff Richard covered it twice, first in 1958 on his debut album Cliff and second in 1983 on Give a Little Bit More in the US and Rock 'n' Roll Silver in the UK. The later version was released as a single in the US during 1984 and peaked at 17 on the Adult Contemporary chart.
- Swedish group Hep Stars recorded a cover of "Donna" in December 1964, at one of Benny Andersson's earliest recording sessions. The song was released in March 1965 as the B-Side to their single "Farmer John", a song which reached number 1 on Kvällstoppen and Tio i Topp that year. "Donna", despite being the B-side, still managed to chart on Kvällstoppen, staying on the week for the week of August 17, 1965, at a position of number 14. A live version was released on their live album Hep Stars on Stage.
- Yugoslav rock band Siluete recorded a cover which was a title track on their 1967 EP Dona.
- Yugoslav rock band Crveni Koralji recorded a cover of the song for their 1988 album Ja sam tvoj čovjek (I'm Your Man).
- Swedish rock band Tages recorded a cover for their self-titled debut EP in 1965.

=== Answer song ===
Within days of the death of Valens, in February 1959 Brooklyn songwriters and record producers Bob Feldman and Jerry Goldstein recorded and released (as The Kittens) "A Letter to Donna" (Unart UR2010), that used Valens' tune but with new lyrics they wrote themselves with "John Ottowa" (a pseudonym of Jack Lewis), that sent a message to Valens' girlfriend, Donna Ludwig.

== Samples and other uses ==
- New York rapper and Wu-Tang affiliate Cappadonna sampled the refrain in the song "Oh-Donna" off his debut album The Pillage.
- The song was used in a television commercial for Visa. In the commercial, a man is getting his arm tattooed with his girlfriend's name on it. He asks midway through the procedure how much it will cost, and discovers that he does not have enough money to cover the cost. He leaves with the tattoo unfinished, and Donna runs away upset. The tattoo says "Don", and the song changes to "Oh Don", to which the man remarks sarcastically, "Very funny".
- The song was played repeatedly in an episode of That '70s Show after Eric and Donna break up.
- The song was featured in Mafia II.
- The song appears in the last season of Parks and Recreation when Donna Meagle gets married.
- The song is covered in a political advertisement run on television in Hawaii in July 2014 by the campaign of Donna Mercado Kim.
- The song was also used in Natti Natasha's song Oh Daddy.
- The song was also used in the God, the Devil, and Bob episode "Neighbor's Keeper."
- A gender-swapped parody version of the song was featured as a hidden track on the end of Don't Stop Skankin' by Reel Big Fish on the album 'Candy Coated Fury' and sung by Julie Stoyer. The name is changed to 'Rudy', thought to be a reference to the song 'A Message To You, Rudy' by some fans but also a common word seen in ska and reggae scenes – short for 'Rude boy'.
