= Ritchie (album) =

Studio album by Ritchie Valens
- Released: October 1959
- Recorded: 1958–59
- Genre: Rock and roll
- Length: 24:23
- Label: Del-Fi
- Producer: Robert Keane

Ritchie Valens chronology
Ritchie Valens (1959)	Ritchie (1959)	Ritchie Valens In Concert at Pacoima Jr. High (1960)

Singles from Ritchie
- 1. "Fast Freight" Released: January 1959; 2. "Little Girl" Released: May 1959; 3. "Stay Beside Me" Released: October 1959; 4. "Cry, Cry, Cry" Released: Feb 1960

Professional ratings
Review scores
Source	Rating
Allmusic	3.5/5 stars

Ritchie is the second and final studio album released posthumously by Ritchie Valens. It is the second of three albums by Valens and includes his remaining unissued masters from Gold Star Studios plus three demos ("My Darling Is Gone", "Now You're Gone" and "Rockin' All Night") he recorded at manager Robert Keane's home studio. Also featured is Valens' last charted single, "Little Girl", which reached #92 on the Billboard charts in July 1959.

== Track listings ==
Side 1

1. "Stay Beside Me" (Bill Olofson, Maurice Ellenhorn) - 2:22
2. "Cry, Cry, Cry" (Ritchie Valens, Robert Kuhn) - 2:16
3. "Big Baby Blues" (Valens) - 1:55
4. "The Paddi-Wack Song" (Traditional; adapted by Valens) - 2:30
5. "My Darling Is Gone" (Valens) - 2:37
6. "Hurry Up" (Shari Sheeley) - 1:54

Side 2

7. "Little Girl" (Valens, Kuhn) - 2:21
8. "Now You're Gone" (Valens) - 2:56
9. "Fast Freight" (Valens) - 2:03
10. "Ritchie's Blues" (Valens, Kuhn) - 1:33
11. "Rockin' All Night" (Valens) - 2:20
