= La Bamba (film) =

1987 biographical film by Luis Valdez

- Theatrical release poster
- Directed by: Luis Valdez
- Written by: Luis Valdez
- Based on: Ritchie Valens; The Day the Music Died
- Produced by: Taylor Hackford; Bill Borden
- Starring: Esai Morales; Rosanna DeSoto; Elizabeth Peña; Joe Pantoliano; Lou Diamond Phillips
- Cinematography: Adam Greenberg
- Edited by: Sheldon Kahn; Don Brochu
- Music by: Carlos Santana; Miles Goodman
- Production company: New Visions
- Distributed by: Columbia Pictures
- Release date: July 24, 1987 (United States)
- Running time: 108 minutes
- Country: United States
- Language: English
- Budget: $6.5 million
- Box office: $54.2 million

La Bamba is a 1987 American biographical drama film written and directed by Luis Valdez. The film follows the life and short-lived musical career of American Chicano rock and roll star Ritchie Valens. The film stars Lou Diamond Phillips as Valens, Esai Morales, Rosanna DeSoto, Elizabeth Peña, Danielle von Zerneck and Joe Pantoliano. The film also covers the effect that Valens' career had on the lives of his half-brother Bob Morales, his girlfriend Donna Ludwig, and the rest of his family. The film is titled after a traditional Mexican folk song of the same name, which Valens transformed into a rock and roll rendition in 1958.

In 2017, La Bamba was selected for preservation in the National Film Registry of the U.S. Library of Congress, being deemed "culturally, historically, or aesthetically significant".

== Plot ==
During the summer of 1957 in Northern California, Richard "Richie" Steven Valenzuela is a 16-year old Mexican-American boy who lives with his mother, Concepcion "Connie" Valenzuela, and his younger brothers and sisters. His family is poor, and he works as a farmhand after school. He loves rock-and-roll music and dreams of becoming a rockstar. Richie has aviophobia due to recurring nightmares about the mid-air collision that occurred over his school, in which his best friend was crushed to death by the fallen aircraft. One day, Richie's troubled half-brother Bob Morales arrives after being released from jail, surprising him and his mother. They all decide to leave the farm and move to a house in Southern California, along with Bob's girlfriend and Richie's ex, Rosie.

Three months later, Richie attends San Fernando High School where he falls in love with his classmate Donna Ludwig and joins his friend Chino's band, the Silhouettes. Bob becomes an alcoholic and starts to abuse Rosie. When he learns that she is pregnant, he refuses to take responsibility. Richie invites Donna to a garage party where he and the Silhouettes are performing, but he doesn't get his turn to sing, and Donna does not attend.

Richie decides to host another party and becomes the Silhouettes' new leader after they vote out their original leader. A drunken Bob crashes the party and starts a brawl among the attendees. The next day, Bob Keane, the owner and president of Del-Fi Records in Hollywood, Los Angeles, auditions Richie after seeing him perform at the party and signs him to his label; Keane becomes his record producer and manager. Richie and Donna become a couple, despite Donna's father disapproving of his daughter dating a Hispanic boy, and Richie starts recording songs like "We Belong Together" and "Come On, Let's Go" at Gold Star Studios. Keane gives Richie his professional name of "Ritchie Valens", which Richie initially dislikes but comes to accept. Ritchie starts releasing his songs on radio and becomes an overnight sensation.

Despite the increasing fame, Ritchie's relationship with Donna suffers with her father refusing to let Ritchie see her. He then writes the song "Donna" as a tribute to her. One night, Bob meets up with Ritchie, and they go to Tijuana, Baja California, Mexico. At a brothel, Ritchie sees a band performing a traditional Mexican folk song called "La Bamba". He awakens the next day in a village and is given a talisman by a local Curandero to protect him from his fear of flying. Ritchie and Bob return home to discover that Rosie gave birth to a girl in their absence. Ritchie decides to make a rock-and-roll rendition of "La Bamba" as a single to go along with "Donna" and convinces Keane to release it.

At first, Ritchie avoids flying to his concerts and appearances, but he conquers his fear when invited to perform "Donna" on American Bandstand in Philadelphia. As Bob becomes more envious of Ritchie's success, Ritchie buys his family a new house and goes to New York City to perform at Alan Freed's 1st Anniversary Rock 'n' Roll Show at the Brooklyn Paramount Theater, meeting musicians Eddie Cochran and Jackie Wilson backstage. He then goes onstage to perform "La Bamba" to the crowd's adoration. Arriving home for Christmas, he is given a welcoming party by his family and friends, but Bob is resentful and starts a fight with Ritchie, breaking his talisman. Ritchie promises Donna that he will always love her and hopes that one day they will get married.

Ritchie joins the Winter Dance Party tour alongside Buddy Holly and the Big Bopper after "La Bamba" and "Donna" reach the top of the Billboard charts. While performing in Clear Lake, Iowa, at the Surf Ballroom, the tour bus' heating system breaks down, so Buddy charters an airplane to fly to their next stop in Fargo, North Dakota. Ritchie, Buddy, and the Big Bopper take off in the airplane during a snowstorm on February 2, 1959. Before the flight, Ritchie makes a call to his brother wherein they resolve their differences. He invites Bob to fly to Chicago to join the tour for family support, which Bob accepts.

The next day, as Bob is fixing his mother's car, he hears on his radio that Ritchie, Buddy, and the Big Bopper's airplane had crashed, killing everyone on board. After Ritchie's funeral procession at the San Fernando Mission Cemetery, Bob walks across a bridge and screams out Ritchie's name, remembering all the good times they had together.

== Cast ==
- Lou Diamond Phillips as Ritchie Valens
- Esai Morales as Roberto "Bob" Morales, Ritchie's half-brother
- Rosanna DeSoto as Connie Valenzuela, Ritchie's mother
- Elizabeth Peña as Rosie Morales
- Danielle von Zerneck as Donna Ludwig
- Joe Pantoliano as Bob Keane
- Rick Dees as Ted Quillin
- Stephen Lee as The Big Bopper
- Sam Anderson as Mr. Ludwig, Donna's father

Also featured are several members of the Valenzuela family and director Luis Valdez's family, including:

- Concepcion Valenzuela (the real Connie Valenzuela, Ritchie's mother) as the older woman sitting next to Ritchie at a family party
- Daniel Valdez (Luis' younger brother) as Ritchie's Uncle Lelo

Brian Setzer has a cameo as Eddie Cochran performing "Summertime Blues" onstage, while Howard Huntsberry plays Jackie Wilson singing "Lonely Teardrops" onstage. Marshall Crenshaw plays Buddy Holly performing "Crying, Waiting, Hoping" at the final concert in Clear Lake, Iowa.

== Background ==
All of Ritchie Valens' songs were performed by Los Lobos, whom the Valenzuela family personally requested be involved in the film. The band has a cameo in the film performing in the brothel ballroom in Tijuana.

== Release ==
The film premiered in wide in the United States on July 24, 1987. In the Philippines, it premiered on September 10, 1987. In Australia it premiered on September 17, 1987.

In its opening weekend, the film grossed a total of $5.7 million from 1,251 theaters, finishing fifth. It went on to gross $52.7 million in the United States over 12 weeks.

The Criterion Collection released a special edition of the movie on Blu-Ray and DVD on September 26, 2023.

== Reception ==
On the review aggregator website Rotten Tomatoes, 83% of 80 critics' reviews are positive, with an average rating of 6.9/10. The website's consensus reads: "Elevated by a perceptive performance by a perfectly cast Lou Diamond Phillips, La Bamba distills its subject's creative energy – and reflects his music's enduring appeal." Metacritic, which uses a weighted average, assigned the film a score of 65 out of 100, based on 12 critics, indicating "generally favorable" reviews. Audiences surveyed by CinemaScore gave the film an average grade of "A" on an A+ to F scale.

Roger Ebert of The Chicago Sun-Times gave the film 3 out of 4 stars, saying La Bamba was "sweet and sentimental" and praising the scenes of common events as some of the best moments: "the portraits of everyday life, of a loving mother, of a brother who loves and resents him, of a kid growing up and tasting fame". The main failing of La Bamba, he thought, was opening with Valens's recurring nightmare which establishes a sense of doom and drains the film of "the sense of fun" Valens must have felt with his new romance and promising career.

Writing for The New York Times, Janet Maslin said she was impressed with Lou Diamond Phillips' performance, and wrote, "A film like this is quite naturally a showcase for its star, and as Valens, Lou Diamond Phillips has a sweetness and sincerity that in no way diminish the toughness of his onstage persona. The role is blandly written, but Mr. Phillips gives Valens backbone."

=== Accolades ===
==== Wins ====
- Broadcast Music Incorporated: BMI Film Music Award, Carlos Santana and Miles Goodman; 1988.
- Hispanic Academy of Media Arts and Sciences: Imagen Latino media-image award; 1988.

==== Nominations ====
- Golden Globe Award: Best Motion Picture, Drama; 1988.

== Remake ==
On August 26, 2024, it was announced that a remake was in the works. The movie will be released through Mucho Mas Media and Sony Pictures with Luis Valdez, the writer and director of the original film, serving as an executive producer. José Rivera is attached to write the script.
