= La Bamba (song) =

Mexican folk song and dance

"La Bamba" (pronounced [la ˈβamba]) is a Mexican folk song, originally from the state of Veracruz. The song is best known from a 1958 adaptation by Ritchie Valens, a top 40 hit on the U.S. charts. Valens's version is ranked number 345 on Rolling Stone magazine's list of "The 500 Greatest Songs of All Time" and is the only song on the list not written or sung in English.

The oldest recorded version known is that of Álvaro Hernández Ortiz, who recorded the song in 1938 under the name El Jarocho.

"La Bamba" has been recorded by numerous other artists, most notably by Los Lobos, whose rendition was the title track of the soundtrack to the 1987 film La Bamba, a biopic about Valens; their version topped many charts in the same year.

== Traditional versions ==
"La Bamba" is an example of the son jarocho musical style, which originated in the Mexican state of Veracruz and combines Spanish (Andalusian), indigenous, Afro-Mexican and Afro-Caribbean musical elements. "La Bamba" is typically played on one or two arpa jarochas (harps) along with the string instruments jarana jarocha and requinto jarocho. Though the song's tune remains the same, the lyrics vary greatly, as performers often improvise verses while performing. However, versions such as those by musical groups Mariachi Vargas de Tecalitlan and Los Pregoneros del Puerto have survived because of the artists' popularity.

The name of the dance "Bamba" has no direct English translation and its origin is uncertain, though there are a few possibilities. It may be connected with the Spanish verb "bambolear", meaning "to sway", "to shake" or "to wobble". Alternatively, there are many that believe it is linked to Africa via the slave trade, specifically from either Central Africa in the Bamba people, or West Africa in the Bambara people. It could also come from the first name Bamba, according to Ritchie Valens biographer Beverly Mendheim, who said in an interview with NPR, "It is an African name. The word itself meant `wood,' and it had to do with the people dancing on a wooden floor."

In one traditional version of this dance performed at weddings and ballet folklórico shows, couples use intricate footwork to create a bow signifying their union. This is also were the tradition of improvising lyrics originates, with wedding guests being encouraged to personalise the song to the newlyweds. However, this would occasionally lead to fights breaking out if the new lyrics were found insulting, and could even result in weapons being drawn.

== Early recordings ==
"La Bamba" has its origin in the state of Veracruz, Mexico. The oldest recorded version known is that of Alvaro Hernández Ortiz, who recorded the song under the name El Jarocho. His recording was released by Victor Records in Mexico in 1938 or 1939, and was reissued on a 1997 compilation by Yazoo Records, The Secret Museum of Mankind Vol. 4.

According to a 1945 article in Life, the song and associated dance were brought "out of the jungle" at Veracruz by American bandleader Everett Hoagland, who introduced it at Ciro's nightclub in Mexico City. It became popular, and the song was adopted by Mexican presidential candidate Miguel Alemán Valdés who used it in his successful campaign. Later in 1945, the music and dance were introduced at the Stork Club in New York City by Arthur Murray. A popular version by Andrés Huesca (1917–1957) and his brother Victor, billed as Hermanos Huesca, was issued on Peerless Records in Mexico around 1945–46. Huesca re-recorded the song for RCA Victor in 1947, and the same year the song featured as a production number in the MGM musical film Fiesta, performed by a group called Los Bocheros. The song was featured in the 1946 Mexican movie Rayando el Sol starring Pedro Armendáriz.

The Swedish-American folk singer William Clauson recorded the song in several languages in the early and mid-1950s. He claimed to have heard the song in Veracruz, and in performance slowed down the tempo to encourage audience participation. Another version, "somewhat bowdlerized", was recorded by Cynthia Gooding on her 1953 Elektra album, Mexican Folk Songs.

== Ritchie Valens version ==
"La Bamba"

Single by Ritchie Valens

from the album Ritchie Valens
- A-side: "Donna"
- Released: October 1958
- Recorded: 1958
- Genre: Rock and roll; chicano rock; rock en español
- Length: 2:06
- Label: Del-Fi
- Songwriters: Traditional, adapted by Richard Valenzuela
- Producer: Bob Keane

Ritchie Valens singles chronology
"Come On, Let's Go" (1958)	"Donna" / "La Bamba" (1958)	"Fast Freight / Big Baby Blues" (1959)

Ritchie Valens learned the song in his youth, from his cousin Dickie Cota. In 1958 he recorded a rock and roll flavored version of "La Bamba", together with session musicians Buddy Clark (string bass); Ernie Freeman (piano); Carol Kaye (acoustic rhythm guitar); René Hall (Danelectro six-string baritone guitar); and Earl Palmer (drums and claves). It was originally released as the B-side of "Donna", on the Del-Fi label.

The song features a simple verse-chorus form. Valens was proud of his Mexican heritage, but also hesitant at first to merge "La Bamba" with rock and roll due to concerns about commercializing the folk song.

Valens's aunt Ernestine Reyes said "he didn't know Spanish at all" and needed help remembering and understanding the song's traditional lyrics. His limited command of Spanish was also confirmed by manager Bob Keane. Valens learned the lyrics phonetically to record "La Bamba" in Spanish.

The song ranked No. 98 on VH1's 100 Greatest Songs of Rock and Roll in 1999, and No. 59 on VH1's 100 Greatest Dance Songs in 2000. Furthermore, Valens' recording of the song was inducted into the Latin Grammy Hall of Fame and the Grammy Hall of Fame.

The song was listed at number 354 in the 500 Greatest Songs of All Time by Rolling Stone magazine, and was the only non-English language song included in the list. It was also included in Robert Christgau's "Basic Record Library" of 1950s and 1960s recordings published in Christgau's Record Guide: Rock Albums of the Seventies (1981). Valens was inducted posthumously into the Rock and Roll Hall of Fame in 2001. In 2018, Valens' version was selected by the Library of Congress for preservation in the National Recording Registry for being "culturally, historically, or aesthetically significant". It is also included in the Rock and Roll Hall of Fame's list of 500 songs that were influential in shaping rock and roll.

=== Charts ===
Weekly chart performance for Ritchie Valens' recording
Chart (1959–1987)	Peak position
Australia (Kent Music Report)	87
Belgium (Ultratop 50 Flanders)	13
Canada (CHUM Chart)	1
France (SNEP)	32
UK Singles (Official Charts)	49
US Billboard Hot 100	22

=== Certifications and sales ===
Certifications and sales for Ritchie Valens' version
Region	Certification	Certified units/sales
New Zealand (RMNZ)	Gold	15,000^{‡}
^{‡} Sales+streaming figures based on certification alone.

== Los Lobos version ==
"La Bamba"

Single by Los Lobos

from the album La Bamba: Original Motion Picture Soundtrack
- Language: Spanish
- B-side: "Charlena"
- Released: June 20, 1987
- Recorded: 1987
- Genre: Rock and roll; Chicano rock; rock en español
- Length: 2:54
- Label: Warner Bros.
- Songwriter: Ritchard Valenzuela
- Producer: Los Lobos

Los Lobos singles chronology
"Come On, Let's Go" / "Ooh! My Head" (1987)	"La Bamba" (1987)	"Down on the Riverbed" (1990)

American rock group Los Lobos recorded a version of the song for the 1987 biopic La Bamba inspired by Valens's life. The Los Lobos version is closely modeled on Valens's version, other than a short coda which finds the band performing an acoustic interpretation of "La Bamba" with traditional instrumentation and rhythms intended to show its roots in the folk music of Veracruz.

The music video directed by Sherman Halsey won the 1988 MTV Video Music Award for Best Video from a Film. The video featured Lou Diamond Phillips, the actor who played Valens in the 1987 film La Bamba. The song was also the fourth wholly non-English language song to top the Billboard Hot 100.

=== Charts ===
==== Weekly charts ====
Weekly chart performance for Los Lobos' cover
Chart (1987)	Peak position
Australia (Australian Music Report)	1
Austria (Ö3 Austria Top 40)	3
Belgium (Ultratop 50 Flanders)	2
Canada Retail Singles (The Record)	1
Canada Top Singles (RPM)	1
Europe (European Hot 100 Singles)	2
Finland (Suomen virallinen singlelista)	1
France (SNEP)	1
Greece (IFPI)	1
Ireland (IRMA)	1
Italy (Musica e dischi)	1
Italy Airplay (Music & Media)	8
Netherlands (Dutch Top 40)	2
Netherlands (Single Top 100)	2
New Zealand (Recorded Music NZ)	1
Norway (VG-lista)	4
Portugal (IFPI)	1
Spain (AFYVE)	1
Sweden (Sverigetopplistan)	3
Switzerland (Schweizer Hitparade)	1
UK Singles (Official Charts)	1
US Billboard Hot 100	1
US Adult Contemporary (Billboard)	4
US Hot Country Songs (Billboard)	57
US Hot Latin Songs (Billboard)	1
US Mainstream Rock Airplay (Billboard)	11
Zimbabwe (ZIMA)	1
West Germany (GfK)	7

Chart (2016)	Peak position
Poland Airplay (ZPAV)	75

2026 weekly chart performance for "Walking on Sunshine"
Chart (2026)	Peak position
Netherlands Airplay (Dutch Charts)	45

==== Year-end charts ====
1987 year-end chart performance for Los Lobos' cover
Chart (1987)	Position
Australia (Australian Music Report)	2
Austria (Ö3 Austria Top 40)	20
Belgium (Ultratop 50 Flanders)	21
Canada Top Singles (RPM)	1
European Top 100 Singles (Music & Media)	12
Netherlands (Dutch Top 40)	16
Netherlands (Single Top 100)	26
New Zealand (RIANZ)	2
Switzerland (Schweizer Hitparade)	4
UK Singles (OCC)	18
US Billboard Hot 100	11
US Hot Crossover Singles (Billboard)	18
US Hot Latin 50 (Billboard)	15
US Cash Box Top 100	11
West Germany (Media Control)	49

=== Certifications and sales ===
Certifications and sales for Los Lobos' cover
Region	Certification	Certified units/sales
Canada (Music Canada)	Platinum	100,000^{^}
France (SNEP)	Gold	500,000^{*}
New Zealand (RMNZ)	Gold	15,000^{‡}
Spain (Promusicae)	Gold	30,000^{‡}
United Kingdom (BPI)	Silver	200,000^{‡}
United States	—	2,000,000
^{*} Sales figures based on certification alone.^{^} Shipments figures based on certification alone.^{‡} Sales+streaming figures based on certification alone.

== Other notable versions ==
- In 1960, Harry Belafonte's live version of the song was released on his album Belafonte Returns to Carnegie Hall. His previously recorded but unreleased studio version from 1958 was included in a 2001 compilation, Very Best of Harry Belafonte, under the title "Bam Bam Bamba".
- In 1978, Spanish singer Antonia Rodriguez released a disco version of the song.
- In 1979, Starland Vocal Band covered the song (titled as "Everybody La Bamba") on their album 4 X 4.
- In 1985, Canadian children's singer Charlotte Diamond included her version of the song on her Juno Award-winning debut album 10 Carrot Diamond. Diamond's version is perhaps best known for appearing in the children's television series Ants in Your Pants.
- In 1987, Selena covered the song for her album And the Winner Is..., from which it was released as a single the same year. Her version reached No. 19 on the Billboard Hot Latin Songs.
- In 1988, "Weird Al" Yankovic released a parody version titled "Lasagna" on his album Even Worse, with lyrics about Italian cuisine.
- A Star Academy 3 version of "La Bamba" reached No. 3 in France on December 13, 2003, In January 2004, it reached No. 5 in Wallonia, Belgium.
- The soundtrack to 40 Years of Fuckin' Up by NOFX features a version of "La Bamba"

== See also ==
- Bambera
- La Bamba, a 1987 film
- La Bamba, soundtrack from the homonymous 1987 film
- List of best-selling Latin singles
