= Suzanne Vega discography =

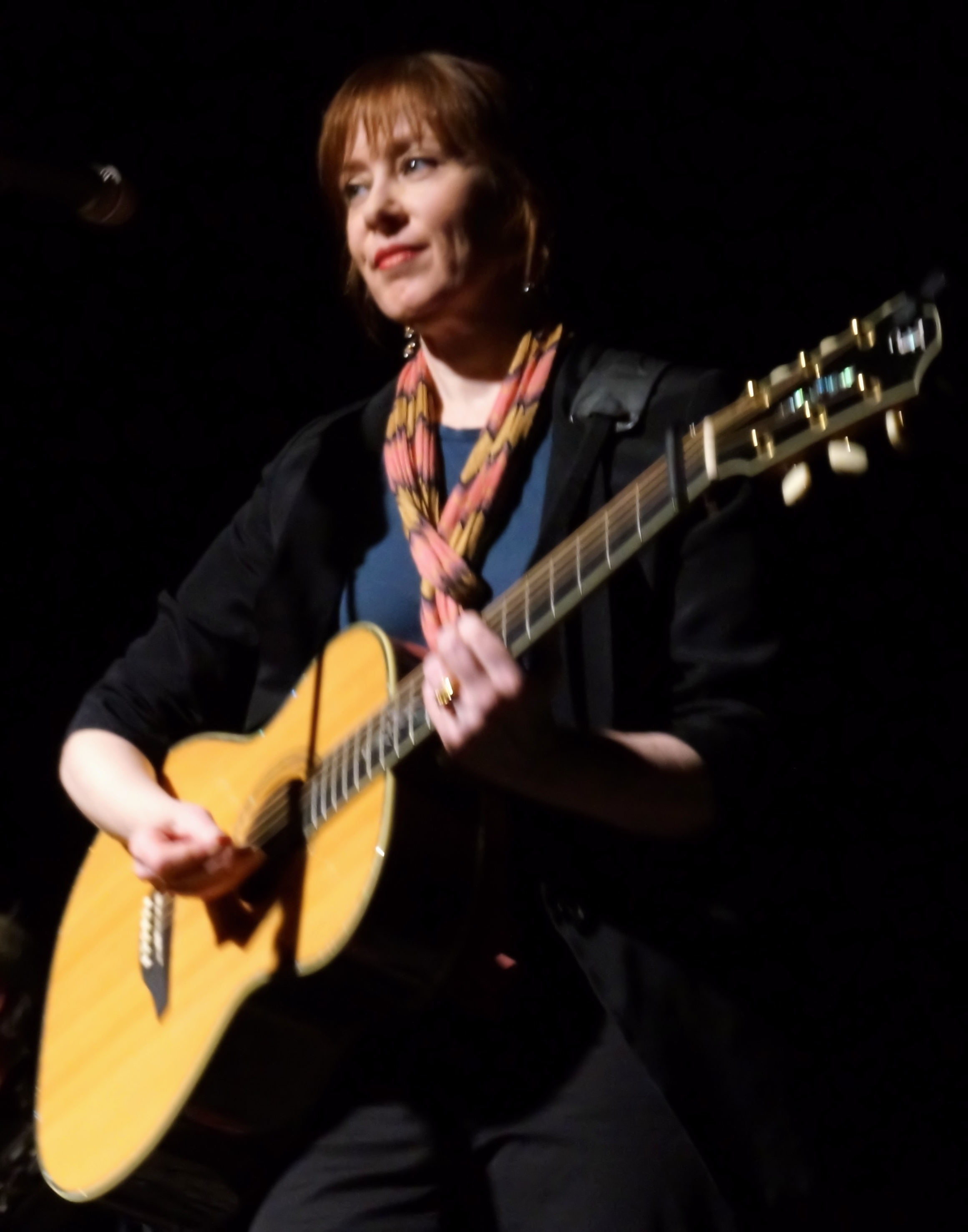
- Vega performing live, 2014
- Studio albums: 10
- EPs: 1
- Live albums: 7
- Compilation albums: 3
- Singles: 23

The discography of American singer-songwriter Suzanne Vega consists of ten studio albums, four acoustic albums, two greatest hits albums, one box set, seven live albums, one extended play and 23 singles.

== Albums ==
=== Studio albums ===
| Title | Album details | Peak chart positions | | | | | | | | | | |
| Title | Album details | US | AUS | AUT | FRA | GER | NLD | NOR | NZL | SWE | SWI | UK |
|---|---|---|---|---|---|---|---|---|---|---|---|---|
| Suzanne Vega | Released: May 1, 1985; Label: A&M | 91 | 23 | — | — | 54 | 11 | — | 9 | 42 | — | 11 |
| Solitude Standing | Released: April 1, 1987; Label: A&M | 11 | 7 | 3 | 18 | 6 | 14 | 2 | 1 | 1 | 8 | 2 |
| Days of Open Hand | Released: April 10, 1990; Label: A&M | 50 | 74 | 9 | 25 | 16 | 29 | 16 | 24 | 19 | 19 | 7 |
| 99.9F° | Released: September 7, 1992; Label: A&M | 86 | 56 | — | — | 27 | 70 | — | 38 | 45 | 24 | 20 |
| Nine Objects of Desire | Released: September 10, 1996; Label: A&M | 92 | 113 | 25 | 25 | 43 | 93 | 24 | — | 39 | 23 | 43 |
| Songs in Red and Gray | Released: September 25, 2001; Label: A&M | 178 | 187 | — | 36 | 53 | — | 34 | — | — | 47 | 100 |
| Beauty & Crime | Released: July 17, 2007; Label: Blue Note, Capitol | 129 | — | — | 52 | 81 | — | — | — | — | 79 | 127 |
| Tales from the Realm of the Queen of Pentacles | Released: February 18, 2014; Label: Amanuensis, Cooking Vinyl | 173 | — | 66 | 124 | 38 | 47 | — | — | — | — | 37 |
| Lover, Beloved: Songs from an Evening with Carson McCullers | Released: October 14, 2016; Label: Amanuensis, Cooking Vinyl | — | — | — | — | — | — | — | — | — | — | — |
| Flying with Angels | Released: May 2, 2025; Label: Amanuensis, Cooking Vinyl | — | — | 68 | — | 18 | — | — | — | — | 24 | 78 |
"—" denotes a recording that did not chart or was not released in that territory.

=== Acoustic albums ===
| Title | Album details | Peak chart positions | | | |
| Title | Album details | US Current | US Folk | BEL (FL) | FRA |
|---|---|---|---|---|---|
| Close-Up Vol. 1, Love Songs | Released: February 2, 2010; Label: Amanuensis, Cooking Vinyl | — | — | — | — |
| Close-Up Vol. 2, People & Places | Released: October 12, 2010; Label: Amanuensis, Cooking Vinyl | 186 | 10 | — | 199 |
| Close-Up Vol. 3, States of Being | Released: July 11, 2011; Label: Amanuensis, Cooking Vinyl | — | — | — | — |
| Close-Up Vol. 4, Songs of Family | Released: September 21, 2012; Label: Amanuensis, Cooking Vinyl | — | — | 160 | — |
"—" denotes a recording that did not chart or was not released in that territory.

=== Compilation albums ===
| Title | Album details | Peak chart positions | | | | | | | Certifications |
| Title | Album details | AUS | BEL (FL) | BEL (WA) | GER | NOR | SWI | UK | Certifications |
|---|---|---|---|---|---|---|---|---|---|
| Tried & True: The Best of Suzanne Vega | Released: September 28, 1998; Label: A&M | 96 | 16 | 33 | 58 | 8 | 29 | 46 | |
| Retrospective: The Best of Suzanne Vega | Released: April 22, 2003; Label: A&M | — | — | — | — | — | — | 27 | BPI: Gold |
| Close-Up Series | Released: August 12, 2014; Label: Amanuensis | — | — | — | — | — | — | — | |
"—" denotes a recording that did not chart or was not released in that territory.

=== Live albums ===
| Title | Album details | Peak chart positions | |
| Title | Album details | US Current | AUS |
|---|---|---|---|
| Live in London 1986 | Released: 1986; Label: A&M | — | 93 |
| Sessions at West 54th | Released: 1997 (Japan), 1998 (US); Label: A&M | — | — |
| Live at the Stephen Talkhouse | Released: October 25, 2005; Label: United Musicians | — | — |
| Solitude Standing: Live at the Barbican | Released: February 18, 2013; Label: Concert Live Ltd. | — | — |
| Live at the Speakeasy | Released: October 20, 2014; Label: All Access | — | — |
| Live at the Bottom Line, NY 1986 | Released: 2015; Label: Air Cuts | — | — |
| Live at Warfield Theatre, San Francisco, 6 Aug 87 – Both Sets (Remastered) | Released: 2015; Label: Amazon? | — | — |
| An Evening of New York Songs and Stories | Released: September 11, 2020; Label: Amanuensis, Cooking Vinyl | 70 | — |

== Extended plays ==
| Title | Album details |
|---|---|
| iTunes Festival: London 2008 | Released: August 5, 2008; Label: Outsider Art |

== Singles ==
=== As main artist ===
| Title | Year | Peak chart positions | | | | | | | | | | Album |
| Title | Year | US | US Main | US Modern | US AAA | AUS | CAN | IRE | NLD | NZL | UK | Album |
|---|---|---|---|---|---|---|---|---|---|---|---|---|
| "Marlene on the Wall" | 1985 | — | — | — | — | — | — | — | — | — | 83 | Suzanne Vega |
| "Small Blue Thing" | 1985 | — | — | — | — | — | — | — | — | — | 65 | Suzanne Vega |
| "Knight Moves" | 1985 | — | — | — | — | — | — | — | — | — | — | Suzanne Vega |
| "Marlene on the Wall" (re-release) | 1986 | — | — | — | — | 39 | — | 9 | 27 | — | 21 | Suzanne Vega |
| "Left of Center" (featuring Joe Jackson) | 1986 | — | — | — | — | 35 | — | 28 | — | — | 32 | Pretty in Pink |
| "Gypsy" | 1986 | — | — | — | — | — | — | — | — | — | 77 | Solitude Standing |
| "Luka" | 1987 | 3 | 15 | — | — | 21 | 5 | 11 | 40 | 8 | 23 | Solitude Standing |
| "Tom's Diner" | 1987 | — | — | — | — | — | — | 26 | — | — | 58 | Solitude Standing |
| "Solitude Standing" | 1987 | 94 | 43 | — | — | 91 | — | — | — | 45 | 79 | Solitude Standing |
| "Book of Dreams" | 1990 | — | 47 | 8 | — | 102 | — | — | — | — | 66 | Days of Open Hand |
| "Tired of Sleeping" | 1990 | — | — | — | — | 145 | — | — | — | — | 101 | Days of Open Hand |
| "Men in a War" | 1990 | — | — | — | — | — | — | — | — | — | 108 | Days of Open Hand |
| "In Liverpool" | 1992 | — | — | — | — | — | — | — | — | — | 52 | 99.9F° |
| "99.9F°" | 1992 | — | — | 13 | — | 125 | — | — | — | — | 46 | 99.9F° |
| "Blood Makes Noise" | 1992 | — | — | 1 | — | 61 | 63 | — | — | 42 | 60 | 99.9F° |
| "When Heroes Go Down" | 1993 | — | — | — | — | 113 | — | — | — | — | 58 | 99.9F° |
| "Caramel" | 1996 | — | — | — | — | — | — | — | — | — | — | Nine Objects of Desire |
| "No Cheap Thrill" | 1996 | — | — | — | 12 | 155 | — | — | — | — | 40 | Nine Objects of Desire |
| "World Before Columbus" | 1997 | — | — | — | — | — | — | — | — | — | — | Nine Objects of Desire |
| "Book & a Cover" | 1998 | — | — | — | — | — | — | — | — | — | — | Tried & True: The Best of Suzanne Vega |
| "Rosemary (Remember Me)" | 1999 | — | — | — | — | — | — | — | — | — | — | Tried & True: The Best of Suzanne Vega |
| "Fool's Complaint" | 2014 | — | — | — | — | — | — | — | — | — | — | Tales from the Realm of the Queen of Pentacles |
| "We of Me" | 2016 | — | — | — | — | — | — | — | — | — | — | Lover, Beloved: Songs from an Evening with Carson McCullers |
| "Rats" | 2024 | — | — | — | — | — | — | — | — | — | — | Flying With Angels |
"—" denotes a recording that did not chart or was not released in that territory.

==== Promotional singles ====
| Title | Year | Peak chart positions | | Album |
| Title | Year | US AAA | UK Airplay | Album |
|---|---|---|---|---|
| "Birth-Day (Love Made Real)" | 1997 | — | — | Nine Objects of Desire |
| "Headshots" | 1997 | — | — | Nine Objects of Desire |
| "The Widow's Walk" | 2001 | 6 | — | Songs in Red and Gray |
| "Last Year's Troubles" | 2001 | — | 42 | Songs in Red and Gray |
| "Penitent" | 2001 | — | — | Songs in Red and Gray |
| "(I'll Never Be) Your Maggie May" | 2002 | — | — | Songs in Red and Gray |
| "Frank & Ava" | 2007 | 20 | 65 | Beauty & Crime |
| "Ludlow Street" | 2007 | — | — | Beauty & Crime |
| "Unbound" | 2007 | — | — | Beauty & Crime |
| "Pornographer's Dream" | 2007 | — | — | Beauty & Crime |
| "I Never Wear White" | 2014 | — | — | Tales from the Realm of the Queen of Pentacles |
| "Harper Lee" | 2016 | — | — | Lover, Beloved: Songs from an Evening with Carson McCullers |

=== As featured artist ===
| Title | Year | Peak chart positions | | | | | | | | | | Album |
| Title | Year | US | AUS | AUT | FRA | GER | IRE | NLD | NZL | SWI | UK | Album |
|---|---|---|---|---|---|---|---|---|---|---|---|---|
| "Tom's Diner" (DNA featuring Suzanne Vega) | 1990 | 5 | 8 | 1 | 16 | 1 | 2 | 4 | 8 | 1 | 2 | Taste This |

== Other contributions ==
- The Smithereens: Especially for You (1986) – "In a Lonely Place"
- Philip Glass: Songs from Liquid Days (1986) – "Lightning" and "Freezing"
- Stay Awake: Various Interpretations of Music from Vintage Disney Films (1988) – "Stay Awake"
- One World One Voice (1990) – "One World, One Voice"
- Deadicated: A Tribute to the Grateful Dead (1991) – "Cassidy" and "China Doll"
- DNA: Taste This (1992) – "Tom's Diner" (DNA Remix) and "Salt Water"
- Hector Zazou: Songs from the Cold Seas (1994) – "The Long Voyage" (with John Cale)
- Grammy's Greatest Moments Volume III (1994) – "Luka" (live version)
- Tower of Song: The Songs of Leonard Cohen (1995) – "Story of Isaac"
- Dead Man Walking soundtrack (1995) – "Woman on the Tier (I'll See You Through)"
- Time and Love: The Music of Laura Nyro (1997) – "Buy and Sell"
- "Perfect Day" (multi-artist cover version recorded for the BBC, 1997)
- Joe Jackson: Heaven & Hell (1997) – "Angel (Lust)"
- Mitchell Froom: Dopamine (1998) – "Dopamine"
- Celebrate the Season (1998) – "Coventry Carol"
- Bleecker Street: Greenwich Village in the 60's (1999) – "So Long, Marianne" (with John Cale)
- Dan Zanes: Rocket Ship Beach (2000) – "Erie Canal"
- Hear Music Volume 7: Waking (2002) – "Widow's Walk"
- 107.1 KGSR Radio Austin – Broadcasts Vol.10 (2002) – "Widow's Walk"
- WYEP Live and Direct: Volume 4 – On Air Performances (2002) – "(I'll Never Be) Your Maggie May"
- Vigil (2004) – "It Hit Home"
- WFUV: City Folk Live VII (2004) – "Penitent"
- The Acoustic Album (2006, Virgin) – "Marlene On the Wall"
- Dar Williams: Promised Land (2008) – "Go to the Woods"
- Danger Mouse and Sparklehorse Present: Dark Night of the Soul (2009) – "The Man Who Played God"
- Pioneers for a Cure: Songs to Fight Cancer (2011) – "Streets of Laredo"
- Jonathan Coulton: Artificial Heart (2011) – "Now I Am an Arsonist"
- Čechomor: Místečko (2011) - "Rain Is Falling"

== Music videos ==
- "Marlene on the Wall" / Film Director – Leslie Liebman / 1985
- "Left of Center" / Film Directors – Ken Ross, Richard Levine / 1986
- "Gypsy" / Film Director – Dominic Brigstocke / 1986
- "Luka" / Film Directors – Candace Reckinger, Michael Patterson / 1987
- "Tom's Diner" / Film Director – Gareth Roberts / 1987
- "Solitude Standing" / Film Director – Jonathan Demme / 1987
- "Book of Dreams" / Film Directors – Andrew Doucette, Geof Kern / 1990
- "Tired of Sleeping" / Film Director – Tarsem Singh / 1990
- "Men in a War" / Film Director – Paula Greif / 1990
- "Tom's Diner" / DNA featuring Suzanne Vega / 1990
- "In Liverpool" / Film Director – Howard Greenhalgh / 1992
- "99.9F°" / Film Director – Nico Beyer / 1992
- "Blood Makes Noise" / Film Director – Nico Beyer / 1992
- "When Heroes Go Down" / Film Director – Peter Care / 1993
- "Caramel" / Film Director – Charles Whittenmeier / 1996
- "Caramel" (Alternate Version) Edited By [Re-edit] – Brett Truett, Mike Ragogna / 1996
- "No Cheap Thrill" / Film Director – David Cameron / 1996
- "Book & a Cover" / Film Director – Geoff Moore / 1998
- "Last Year's Troubles" / Film Director – Tim Vega / 2001
- "Frank & Ava" / Film Director – / 2007
- "Fool's Complaint" / lyrics video / 2014
- "We of Me" / Film Director – Chuck Moore / 2016
