= Close-Up Series =

Box set by Suzanne Vega
- Released: August 12, 2014
- Recorded: 2010–2014
- Genre: Acoustic
- Label: Amanuensis Productions

Suzanne Vega chronology
| Tales from the Realm of the Queen of Pentacles (2014) | Close-Up Series (2014) | Lover, Beloved: Songs from an Evening with Carson McCullers (2016) |

Close-Up Series is a 2014 CD box set from Suzanne Vega. It collects the four Close-Up acoustic albums that Vega produced from 2010 to 2012 as well as bonus tracks and a DVD of a live performance with backstage footage.

== Track listing ==
=== Close-Up Vol. 1, Love Songs ===
All tracks are written by Suzanne Vega.

| No. | Title | Original album | Length |
|---|---|---|---|
| 1. | "Small Blue Thing" | Suzanne Vega (1985) | 4:04 |
| 2. | "Caramel" | Nine Objects of Desire (1996) | 3:06 |
| 3. | "(If You Were) In My Movie" | 99.9F° (1992) | 2:56 |
| 4. | "Gypsy" | Solitude Standing (1987) | 4:10 |
| 5. | "Marlene on the Wall" | Suzanne Vega | 4:15 |
| 6. | "(I'll Never Be) Your Maggie May" | Songs in Red and Gray (2001) | 3:37 |
| 7. | "Harbor Song" | Songs in Red and Gray | 4:17 |
| 8. | "Headshots" | Nine Objects of Desire | 2:54 |
| 9. | "Song in Red and Gray" | Songs in Red and Gray | 4:16 |
| 10. | "Stockings" | Nine Objects of Desire | 3:40 |
| 11. | "Some Journey" | Suzanne Vega | 4:23 |
| 12. | "Bound" | Beauty & Crime (2007) | 4:17 |
| Total length: | | | 45:55 |

=== Close-Up Vol. 2, People & Places ===
All tracks are written by Suzanne Vega, except where noted.

| No. | Title | Original album | Length |
|---|---|---|---|
| 1. | "Luka" | Solitude Standing (1987) | 3:13 |
| 2. | "Zephyr & I" | Beauty & Crime (2007) | 3:09 |
| 3. | "New York Is a Woman" | Beauty & Crime | 2:59 |
| 4. | "In Liverpool" | 99.9F° (1992) | 4:50 |
| 5. | "Calypso" | Solitude Standing | 3:45 |
| 6. | "Fat Man and Dancing Girl" (Vega, Mitchell Froom) | 99.9F° | 2:18 |
| 7. | "The Queen and the Soldier" | Suzanne Vega (1985) | 5:03 |
| 8. | "Rock in This Pocket (Song of David)" | 99.9F° | 3:40 |
| 9. | "Angel's Doorway" | Beauty & Crime | 2:53 |
| 10. | "Ironbound/Fancy Poultry" (Vega, Anton Sanko) | Solitude Standing | 5:01 |
| 11. | "Neighborhood Girls" | Suzanne Vega | 3:32 |
| 12. | "Tom's Diner" | Solitude Standing | 4:34 |
| 13. | "The Man Who Played God" (Danger Mouse, Mark Linkous, Vega) | | 3:08 |
| Total length: | | | 48:06 |

=== Close-Up Vol. 3, States of Being ===
All tracks are written by Suzanne Vega, except where noted.

| No. | Title | Original album | Length |
|---|---|---|---|
| 1. | "Undertow" | Suzanne Vega (1985) | 3:31 |
| 2. | "When Heroes Go Down" | 99.9F° (1992) | 2:06 |
| 3. | "My Favorite Plum" | Nine Objects of Desire (1996) | 2:38 |
| 4. | "Solitude Standing" (Suzanne Vega, Michael Visceglia, Anton Sanko, Marc Shulman, Stephen Ferrera) | Solitude Standing (1987) | 3:59 |
| 5. | "Cracking" | Suzanne Vega (1985) | 2:58 |
| 6. | "Last Year's Troubles" | Songs in Red and Gray (2001) | 3:08 |
| 7. | "Solitaire" | Songs in Red and Gray (2001) | 2:15 |
| 8. | "Tombstone" | Nine Objects of Desire (1996) | 2:47 |
| 9. | "Blood Makes Noise" | 99.9F° (1992) | 3:05 |
| 10. | "50-50 Chance" | Days of Open Hand (1990) | 2:48 |
| 11. | "Penitent" | Songs in Red and Gray (2001) | 4:08 |
| 12. | "Straight Lines" | Suzanne Vega (1985) | 4:03 |
| 13. | "Pornographer's Dream" | Beauty & Crime (2007) | 3:31 |
| 14. | "Instant of the Hour After" (Vega, Duncan Sheik) | Carson McCullers Talks About Love (2011) | 3:10 |
| Total length: | | | 44:09 |

=== Close-Up Vol. 4, Songs of Family ===
All tracks are written by Suzanne Vega, except where noted.

| No. | Title | Writer(s) | Original album | Length |
|---|---|---|---|---|
| 1. | "Rosemary" | | Tried and True (1998) | 2:54 |
| 2. | "Honeymoon Suite" | | Nine Objects of Desire (1996) | 3:13 |
| 3. | "World Before Columbus" | | Nine Objects of Desire (1996) | 3:00 |
| 4. | "As You Are Now" | | Beauty & Crime (2007) | 2:28 |
| 5. | "Soap And Water" | | Songs in Red and Gray (2001) | 2:52 |
| 6. | "Widow's Walk" | | Songs in Red and Gray (2001) | 3:42 |
| 7. | "Blood Sings" | | 99.9F° (1992) | 3:20 |
| 8. | "Bad Wisdom" | | 99.9F° (1992) | 3:10 |
| 9. | "Ludlow Street" | | Beauty & Crime (2007) | 3:11 |
| 10. | "Tired Of Sleeping" | | Days of Open Hand (1990) | 3:47 |
| 11. | "Pilgrimage" | Vega, A. Sanko | Days of Open Hand (1990) | 4:26 |
| 12. | "Brother Mine" | | previously unreleased | 3:14 |
| 13. | "The Silver Lady" | | previously unreleased | 5:35 |
| 14. | "Daddy Is White" | | previously unreleased | 2:44 |

=== Vol. 1-4, Bonus Material ===
All tracks on the fifth disc were previously available as online bonus tracks from various retailers

All tracks are written by Suzanne Vega, except where noted.

| No. | Title | Original album | Length |
|---|---|---|---|
| 1. | "99.9F°" | 99.9F° (1992) | 3:06 |
| 2. | "It Makes Me Wonder" | Songs in Red and Gray (2001) | 4:03 |
| 3. | "Freeze Tag" | Suzanne Vega | 2:52 |
| 4. | "Knight Moves" | Suzanne Vega | 3:51 |
| 5. | "Luka (Spanish Version)" | Solitude Standing | 3:24 |
| 6. | "Frank and Ava" | Beauty & Crime | 2:38 |
| 7. | "Wooden Horse (Casper Hauser's Song)" (Vega, Michael Visceglia, Sanko, Marc Shulman, Stephen Ferrera) | Solitude Standing | 4:22 |
| 8. | "Song of Sand" | 99.9F° | 3:09 |
| 9. | "Room off the Street" (Vega, Sanko) | Days of Open Hand | 2:57 |
| 10. | "Priscilla" | Songs in Red & Gray | 3:40 |
| 11. | "Anniversary" | Beauty & Crime | 3:04 |
| 12. | "Language" (Suzanne Vega, Michael Visceglia) | Solitude Standing | 4:03 |
| Total length: | | | 41:09 |

=== Live & Backstage at City Winery ===
The final disc is a DVD featuring live concert footage at the City Winery in New York City interspersed with interview footage.

1. Introduction from Suzanne
2. "Tom's Diner"
3. Interview
4. "Rock in this Pocket"
5. Interview
6. "Gypsy"
7. Interview
8. "Solitude Standing"
9. Interview
10. "Room off the Street"
11. Interview
12. "Silver Lady"
13. Interview
14. "Daddy Is White"
15. Interview
16. "Penitent"
17. Interview
18. "Luka"

== Charts ==
Chart performance for Close-Up Series
| Chart (2022) | Peak position |
|---|---|
| UK Americana Albums (OCC) | 11 |
| UK Independent Albums (OCC) | 29 |
| Scottish Albums (OCC) | 66 |
