= Solitude Standing: Live at the Barbican =

Live album by Suzanne Vega
- Released: February 18, 2013
- Recorded: October 16, 2012
- Venue: Barbican Centre (London)
- Genres: Folk rock; acoustic rock
- Label: Concert Live

Solitude Standing: Live at the Barbican is a live album by American singer-songwriter Suzanne Vega. It was recorded on 16 October 2012 at the Barbican Centre in London, on the final celebratory concert to mark 25th anniversary of her studio album Solitude Standing (1987). Disc one is a live performance of the Solitude Standing album, and the second one contains other Vega songs.

== Track listing ==
Disc One

1. "Tom's Diner"
2. "Luka"
3. "Ironbound / Fancy Poultry"
4. "In The Eye"
5. "Night Vision"
6. "Solitude Standing"
7. "Calypso"
8. "Language"
9. "Gypsy"
10. "Wooden Horse / Caspar Hauser’s Song"

Disc Two

1. "Marlene On The Wall"
2. "Left of Center"
3. "Tombstone"
4. "Blood Makes Noise"
5. "The Queen and the Soldier"
6. "Some Journey"
7. "Tom’s Diner" (Reprise)
8. "Caramel"
9. "In Liverpool"
10. "Rosemary"

== Personnel ==
- Suzanne Vega - acoustic guitar, vocals
- Gerry Leonard - guitar
- Mike Visceglia - bass
- Doug Yowell - drums
- Alison Balsom - trumpet
- Hazel Fernandez - backing vocals
