= An Evening of New York Songs and Stories =

Live album by Suzanne Vega
- Released: September 11, 2020
- Recorded: March 12-14, 2019
- Venue: Cafe Carlyle
- Genres: Folk rock, acoustic rock
- Length: 62:23
- Label: Cooking Vinyl / Amanuensis

Suzanne Vega chronology
Lover, Beloved: Songs from an Evening with Carson McCullers (2016)	An Evening of New York Songs and Stories (2020)	Flying with Angels (2025)

Professional ratings
Aggregate scores
Source	Rating
Metacritic	71/100
Review scores
Source	Rating
AllMusic	3.5/5 stars
American Songwriter	4/5 stars
Classic Rock	3.5/5 stars
Mojo	3/5 stars
MusicOMH	4/5 stars

An Evening of New York Songs and Stories is a live album by the American singer-songwriter Suzanne Vega. It was recorded in March 2019 at Café Carlyle on the Upper East Side of Manhattan, New York City. This recording was released on September 11, 2020. The album features longtime collaborator Gerry Leonard on guitar, Jeff Allen on bass, and Jamie Edwards on the keyboard.

== Track listing ==
1. "Marlene on the Wall" – 4:19
2. "Luka" – 3:10
3. "Conversation: So how many people are here from out of town?" – 0:45
4. "New York Is a Woman" – 3:16
5. "Conversation: This next song takes place on 59th Street..." – 0:39
6. "Frank and Ava" – 2:43
7. "Conversation: So I myself came to New York City when I was 2½ years old..." – 0:27
8. "Gypsy" – 4:28
9. "Freeze Tag" – 2:53
10. "Pornographer's Dream" – 3:39
11. "Conversation: This next song is called New York Is My Destination..." – 0:22
12. "New York Is My Destination" – 3:20
13. "Conversation: The first time I saw Lou Reed..." – 0:51
14. "Walk on the Wild Side" – 4:16
15. "Ludlow Street" – 3:34
16. "Cracking" – 3:04
17. "Conversation: And now we've got a song about those times" – 0:07
18. "Some Journey" – 4:49
19. "Conversation: I'm gonna close with this song..." – 0:10
20. "Tom's Diner" – 5:04
21. "Conversation: Would you like another one?" – 0:17
22. "Anniversary" – 3:04
23. "Tombstone" – 3:02
24. "Thin Man" – 4:04

== Charts ==
Chart (2020)	Peak position
US Top Current Albums (Billboard)	70
UK Album Sales Chart (OCC)	11
UK Independent Albums (Official Charts)	4
German Albums (Offizielle Top 100)	21
French Albums (SNEP)	185
Belgian Albums (Ultratop Flanders)	133
Belgian Albums (Ultratop Wallonia)	148
Swiss Albums (Schweizer Hitparade)	42
Austrian Albums (Ö3 Austria)	60
Scottish Albums (Official Charts)	12
