= Flying with Angels =

Studio album by Suzanne Vega
- Released: May 2, 2025
- Studio: GB's Juke Joint
- Length: 37:29
- Label: Cooking Vinyl
- Producer: Gerry Leonard

Suzanne Vega chronology
An Evening of New York Songs and Stories (2020)	Flying with Angels (2025)

Singles from Flying with Angels
- 1. "Rats" Released: September 17, 2024; 2. "Speakers' Corner" Released: March 4, 2025; 3. "Chambermaid" Released: April 8, 2025; 4. "Alley" Released: April 25, 2025

Flying with Angels is the tenth studio album by American singer-songwriter Suzanne Vega. It was released on May 2, 2025, through Cooking Vinyl. The album was produced by guitarist and longtime collaborator Gerry Leonard. It is Vega's first album of all-new material since 2014's Tales from the Realm of the Queen of Pentacles. (Note: Vega also released her ninth studio album, Lover, Beloved: Songs from an Evening with Carson McCullers in 2016; however, this album was made of older material stemming from Vega's 2011 play Carson McCullers Talks About Love.) Describing the album's lyrical content, Vega stated: "Each song on the album takes place in an atmosphere of struggle. Struggle to survive, to speak, to dominate, to win, to escape, to help someone else, or just live."

The first single from Flying with Angels, entitled "Rats", was released on September 17, 2024. The album was announced on March 4, 2025, alongside the release of its second single, "Speakers' Corner". "Chambermaid" and "Alley" were the last two singles.

== Track listing ==
Flying with Angels track listing
No.	Title	Writer(s)	Length
1.	"Speakers' Corner"	Suzanne Vega; Gerry Leonard	3:20
2.	"Flying with Angels"	Vega	4:29
3.	"Witch"	Vega; Leonard	4:36
4.	"Chambermaid"	Bob Dylan; Vega; Leonard	3:23
5.	"Love Thief"	Vega; Leonard	3:35
6.	"Lucinda"	Vega; Leonard	3:36
7.	"Last Train from Mariupol"	Vega	2:53
8.	"Alley"	Vega; Leonard	3:31
9.	"Rats"	Vega; Leonard	4:09
10.	"Galway"	Vega; Leonard	3:57
Total length:			37:29

Note: "Chambermaid" is an adaptation of "I Want You", written by Bob Dylan, with additional lyrics by Vega and additional music by Vega and Leonard.

== Personnel ==
Credits adapted from Tidal.

- Suzanne Vega – lead vocals (all tracks), bass guitar (1)
- Gerry Leonard – production (all tracks), electric guitar (tracks 1–4, 6–10), acoustic guitar (5), background vocals (8)
- Catherine Russell – background vocals (tracks 1–6, 10)
- Aaron Johnston – drums (tracks 1–6)
- Daniel Mintseris – keyboards (tracks 1, 9)
- Jeff Hill – bass guitar (tracks 2–10)
- Ruby Froom – background vocals (tracks 7, 8)
- Jamie Edwards – keyboards (tracks 3,5,6,7,8)

== Charts ==
Chart performance for Flying with Angels
Chart (2025)	Peak position
Austrian Albums (Ö3 Austria)	68
Belgian Albums (Ultratop Flanders)	21
Belgian Albums (Ultratop Wallonia)	29
German Albums (Offizielle Top 100)	18
Scottish Albums (OCC)	8
Swiss Albums (Schweizer Hitparade)	24
UK Albums (OCC)	78
UK Independent Albums (OCC)	4
