= Sessions at West 54th =

American television program

- Developed by: Jeb Brien; Niki Vettel
- Presented by: Chris Douridas; David Byrne; John Hiatt
- Country of origin: United States
- No. of seasons: 3
- No. of episodes: 79

Original release
- Release: July 5, 1997 – July 29, 2000

Sessions at West 54th is an American television program broadcast 1997 to 2000 that featured music performances from artists in a wide range of genres. It was produced syndication by public television company American Program Service (APS) (now American Public Television, Boston) and was carried on many public television stations. Episodes were 60 minutes, most often featuring two performers each granted 30 minutes but occasionally with other configurations.

In some ways Sessions was inspired by Austin City Limits, but it featured a wider array of genres and performers. It was called Sessions at West 54th because it was taped at Sony Music Studios on West 54th Street in Manhattan. Jeb Brien and Niki Vettel developed the series after working on APS concert specials with Suzanne Vega and Ottmar Liebert. The series first aired on July 5, 1997, when it was included in the Saturday late-night lineup of stations covering about 85% of the country. After the program ended, an edited commercial television version also aired on the commercial Trio cable television network.

Host during season one was Chris Douridas of KCRW in Santa Monica, California during Season 1, while musician David Byrne took over hosting duties during Season 2, and musician John Hiatt was the host during Season 3.

== Episode list ==
=== Season 1 (1997) ===
No. overall	No. in season	Performers	Original release date
1	1	Paula Cole, k.d. Lang	July 5, 1997
Lang's set includes "Don't Smoke in Bed" and "My Old Addiction." Cole sings "Carmen" and "I Don't Want to Wait." Hosted by Chris Douridas.
2	2	Taj Mahal, Albita Rodríguez	July 12, 1997
Taj's blues set includes "She Caught the Katy," "Corrine, Corrina" and "Mr. Pitiful." Albita performs "Corazon rumbero," "El son del tahurete," "Valca el brillo de tus ojos" and "El chico Chevere." Hosted by Chris Douridas.
3	3	Nil Lara, Bobby McFerrin	July 19, 1997
McFerrin's set features improvisational vocal harmonies and interactions with other performers. Lara's songs include "Crawl," "Bleeding," "Money Makes the Monkey Dance" and "How Was I to Know?" Hosted by Chris Douridas.
4	4	Billy Bragg, Nanci Griffith	July 26, 1997
Nancy Griffith and Billy Bragg perform. Hosted by Chris Douridas.
5	5	Wynton Marsalis and the Lincoln Center Jazz Orchestra	August 2, 1997
Wynton Marsalis and the Lincoln Center Jazz Orchestra perform selections from Marsalis's Pulitzer Prize-winning jazz oratorio "Blood on the Fields," featuring vocalists Cassandra Wilson, Jon Hendricks and Miles Griffith. Songs include: "Soul for Sale."
6	6	Sonic Youth, Bill Frisell	August 9, 1997
New York City's Sonic Youth and Seattle's Bill Frisell perform. The eclectic Frisell is joined by a host of musicians, including Jimmie Dale Gilmore and drummer Patrick Hay, as well as legendary dobro player Jerry Douglas and vocalist Robin Holcomb. Host: Chris Douridas.
7	7	Richard Thompson, Suzanne Vega	August 16, 1997
Richard Thompson and Suzanne Vega perform. Thompson's set features "I Feel So Good" and "1952 Vincent Black Lightning"; Vega's includes "Cracking," "Caramel," "Queen and the Soldier" and "Gypsy." Host: Chris Douridas.
8	8	Shawn Colvin, Keb' Mo'	August 23, 1997
Performances by Shawn Colvin and Keb' Mo.' Colvin's set includes "Sunny Came Home," "Get Out of This House" and "You and the Mona Lisa." Keb' Mo' sings "City Boy," "More than One Way Home" and "Just Like You."
9	9	Philip Glass, eels	August 30, 1997
Performances by Philip Glass and the trio Eels. Glass's music includes "Planctus" (with singer Natalie Merchant), and "Facades." Eels' set includes "Susan's House," "Flower," "Beautiful Freak" and "Novocaine for the Soul."
10	10	Emmylou Harris, Daniel Lanois	September 6, 1997
Emmylou Harris and Daniel Lanois perform. Harris sings "Wrecking Ball" with her band Spyboy; Lanois joins her for "Deeper Well," and has a solo set that includes "Still Water." Host: Chris Douridas.
11	11	Meshell Ndegeocello, Café Tacuba	September 13, 1997
Performances by Me'Shell NdegeOcello and Café Tacuba. NdegeOcello's set includes "Step into the Projects" and "Free My Heart." Café Tacuba plays "No Controles," "Esa Noche," "Fin dela Infancia" and "Chilanga Banda." Host: Chris Douridas.
12	12	Joshua Redman, Zap Mama	September 20, 1997
Performances by saxophonist Joshua Redman and Zap Mama, a Belgian-based group that mixes African, European and American sounds. Host: Chris Douridas.
13	13	Patti Smith, Ron Sexsmith & Elvis Costello	September 27, 1997
Performances by Patti Smith and Ron Sexsmith, whose set includes "Thinking Out Loud." Among Smith's selections: her tribute to Kurt Cobain, "About a Boy"; and "Wing."
14	14	Joe Jackson	October 4, 1997
Joe Jackson performs selections from "Heaven & Hell," a thematic pop-classical hybrid about the seven deadly sins. Violinist Nadja Salerno-Sonnenberg is among the guest artists. Songs include "Angel," "Tuzla" and "Fugue 2/Song of Daedalus." Host: Chris Douridas.
15	15	Sinéad O'Connor, World Party	October 11, 1997
World Party and Sinéad O'Connor perform. World Party's selections include "Is It like Today?" and "Vanity Fair"; O'Connor sings "To Mother You" and "John, I Love You."
16	16	Gipsy Kings, Squirrel Nut Zippers	October 18, 1997
Performances by the guitar band Gipsy Kings and the revivalist jazz group Squirrel Nut Zippers, whose set includes "Hell," "Club Limbo" and "Put a Lid on It." Gipsy Kings play a rousing version of "Volare" and "Ami Wa Wa." Host: Chris Douridas.
17	17	Shawn Colvin, Yo-Yo Ma	October 25, 1997
A double bill featuring cellist Yo-Yo Ma, who performs with a tango quintet; and a repeat performance by Shawn Colvin. Ma's set includes "Tango Suite" and "Tango Remembrances." Colvin sings "You and the Mona Lisa" and "Sunny Came Home."
18	18	Rickie Lee Jones, Tindersticks	November 1, 1997
Performing: Rickie Lee Jones; Tindersticks.
19	19	Beck, Ben Folds Five	November 8, 1997
Performing: piano-based trio Ben Folds Five; and double-Grammy winner Beck, whose set includes "Devil's Haircut," "Where It's At" and "I Wanna Get with You." Ben Folds Five performs "Missing the War," "Smoke" and "One Angry Dwarf and 200 Solemn Faces." Host: Chris Douridas.
20	20	David Byrne	November 15, 1997
A visually arresting concert with David Byrne. Songs include "Take Me to the River," "Dance on Vaseline," "Miss America," "Psycho Killer" and "Fuzzy Freaky." Also: an interview with the singer-songwriter, who talks about contemporary music. Host: Chris Douridas.
21	21	Fiona Apple, Luscious Jackson	November 22, 1997
Performing: Fiona Apple; Luscious Jackson. Apple's set includes "Shadowboxer," "Criminal" and "Never Is a Promise." Host: Chris Douridas.
22	22	Sheryl Crow, Gillian Welch	November 29, 1997
Sheryl Crow performs "Everyday Is a Winding Road," "Home" and "Sweet Rosalyn" in a double bill she shares with alternative country artist Gillian Welch. Host: Chris Douridas.
23	23	Leo Kottke, Laura Love	December 6, 1997
A double bill featuring guitar virtuoso Leo Kottke and singer-songwriter Laura Love, whose set includes "Octoroon" and Kurt Cobain's "Come As You Are." Kottke performs "Airproofing," "Across the Street," "Deep River Blues" and "Peckerwood."
24	24	Ani DiFranco, Tricky	December 13, 1997
Performances by singer-songwriter Ani DiFranco and trip hop artist Tricky. DiFranco's set includes "Letter to a John," "32 Flavors" and "Swan Dive." Tricky performs "Makes Me Wanna Die," "Christiansands" and "Black Steel." Host: Chris Douridas.
25	25	Best of Season I, Vol. I	December 19, 1997
Part 1 of two. A "best of" compilation that includes k.d. lang ("Don't Smoke in Bed"); Beck ("Jack-Ass") and Sheryl Crow ("Home"). Additional selections from Patti Smith, David Byrne, Sinéad O'Connor and Zap Mama. Host: Chris Douridas.
26	26	Best of Season I, Vol. II	December 19, 1997
The conclusion of a two-part "best of" compilation includes Richard Thompson ("I Feel So Good"); Fiona Apple ("Never Is a Promise"); David Byrne ("Miss America") and Wynton Marsalis ("Freedom's in the Trying"). Additional selections by Sheryl Crow. Host: Chris Douridas.

=== Season 2 (1998) ===
No. overall	No. in season	Performers	Original release date
27	1	Lucinda Williams, The Mavericks	July 11, 1998
Lucinda Williams and the Mavericks perform.
28	2	John Hiatt, Imani Coppola	July 18, 1998
A double bill featuring musician Imani Coppola and veteran singer-songwriter John Hiatt, whose set includes "Have a Little Faith in Me," a rendition that's backed by a 10-member women's choir.
29	3	Pat Metheny Group, Angelique Kidjo	July 25, 1998
Performing: the Pat Metheny Group, whose set includes guest bassist Charlie Haden. Also: Paris-based singer Angelique Kidjo, a West African native whose music reflects her heritage and the American soul music that inspires her. Host: David Byrne.
30	4	Natalie Merchant, Virginia Rodrigues	July 31, 1998
Performances by singer-songwriter Natalie Merchant and Brazilian musician Virginia Rodrigues.
31	5	Lou Reed	August 7, 1998
Lou Reed plays a set that includes the classic "Sweet Jane," as well as subsequent material such as "Set the Twilight Reeling." Other selections include "Perfect Day," "Pale Blue Eyes," "Dirty Boulevard" and "Satellite of Love." Host: David Byrne.
32	6	Medeski, Martin & Wood, Holly Cole	August 14, 1998
A double bill featuring singer Holly Cole and the trio Medeski, Martin and Wood, whose selections include "Wiggly's Way," "Coconut Boogaloo" and "Latin Shuffle." Cole's set includes the Tom Waits song "Jersey Girl."
33	7	Brian Setzer Orchestra, Jimmy Scott	August 21, 1998
The Brian Setzer Orchestra; jazz vocalist Jimmy Scott. Setzer's set included "The Dirty Boogie," "Jump, Jive an' Wail," "This Cat's on a Hot Tin Roof," "Switchblade 327" and "Guitar Rag," a piece for solo guitar. Scott's selections include "All of Me" and "Slave to Love" Host: David Byrne.
34	8	Elvis Costello and Burt Bacharach	August 30, 1998
Elvis Costello and Burt Bacharach perform songs from their 1998 release, "Painted from Memory," including the title track, "Toledo," "This House Is Empty Now" and "God Give Me Strength," which they wrote for the 1996 film "Grace of My Heart." Host: David Byrne.
35	9	Cowboy Junkies, Kronos Quartet	September 6, 1998
A double bill featuring Kronos Quartet and Cowboy Junkies, whose set includes "Miles from Our Home" and a cover of the classic "Sweet Jane." Host: David Byrne.
36	10	Neil Finn, The Mavericks	September 13, 1998
Former Crowded House front man Neil Finn plays selections from his 1998 solo release, "Try Whistling This," including "Last One Standing" and "Sinner," as well as the Crowded House hit "Don't Dream It's Over." Also: a performance by the Mavericks. Host: David Byrne.
37	11	Des'ree, John Hiatt	September 17, 1998
A set by Des'ree includes "Feels So High," "Life," "I'm Kissing You" and "You Gotta Be." Also: an encore performance by John Hiatt, who performs "Drive South," "Tennessee Plates, "Cry Love" and "Have a Little Faith in Me." Host: David Byrne.
38	12	Lyle Lovett	September 27, 1998
Lyle Lovett is the sole performer. Selections include "Step Inside This House," "More Pretty Girls than One," "Bears" and "Flyin' Shoes," all songs from his 1998 double-CD set. The set also features "If I Had a Boat," "She's No Lady" and "Rollin' By." Host: David Byrne.
39	13	Béla Fleck and the Flecktones, Wasis Diop	October 4, 1998
A set by Bela Fleck and the Flecktones includes "Big Country," "Almost 12," "Communication" and "Stomping Ground." Also: Senegalese singer Wasis Diop performs "Toxu," "Soweto Daal," "Colobane (Hymne for African Unity)." Host: David Byrne.
40	14	Liz Phair, John Lurie and the Lounge Lizards	October 11, 1998
Liz Phair sings "Polyester Bride," "6'1" " and "Mesmerizing." Also: John Lurie and the Lounge Lizards perform "She Drove Me Mad" and "Queen of All Ears." Host: David Byrne.
41	15	Phish, Rufus Wainwright	October 20, 1998
A performance by Phish includes "Birds of a Feather," "Ghost" and "Taste." Rufus Wainwright sings "Danny Boy," "Millbrook," "In My Arms," "April Fools" and "Foolish Love."
42	16	Los Amigos Invisibles, Afro-Cuban All Stars	October 27, 1998
Los Amigos Invisibles and the Afro-Cuban All Stars perform separate sets. Los Amigos' selections include "Sexy," "Ultra Funk," "La Groupie" and "Ponerte En Cuatro." The All Stars' set includes "Amor Verdadero." Host: David Byrne.
43	17	John Mellencamp, Randy Newman	November 3, 1998
John Mellencamp and Randy Newman perform separate sets. Mellencamp's selections include "Small Town," "Rain On The Scarecrow" and "Eden Is Burning." Newman's set includes "Last Night," "Marie," "You've Got a Friend in Me," "I Miss You" and "Burn On." Host: David Byrne.
44	18	PJ Harvey, Chocolate Genius	November 10, 1998
P.J. Harvey and Chocolate Genius play separate sets. Harvey's selections include "Catherine," "My Beautiful Leah" and "Is This Desire?"; Chocolate Genius sings "Half a Man," "My Mom" and "Safe and Sound," among others. Host: David Byrne.
45	19	Tori Amos	November 17, 1998
Tori Amos performs. Her set includes "iieee," "Past the Mission," "Caught a Lite Sneeze" and "The Waitress." Host: David Byrne.
46	20	Beth Orton, Joe Henry	November 24, 1998
Joe Henry and Beth Orton perform separate sets. Henry's selections include "Bob & Ray" and "Ohio Air Show Airplane Crash." Orton's set includes "Galaxy of Emptiness" and "She Cries Your Name." Host: David Byrne.
47	21	Balanescu Quartet, Ozomatli	December 1, 1998
Host David Byrne joins the Balanescu Quartet for their set, which includes reworkings of some of his classics, as well as a version of "I Wanna Dance with Somebody." Also: Ozomatli performs.
48	22	Steve Earle, Del McCoury Band	December 8, 1998
Steve Earle and the Del McCoury Band perform a set of original and classic bluegrass songs. Host: David Byrne.
49	23	Vic Chesnutt, Lucinda Williams	December 15, 1998
The Nashville band Lambchop backs Georgia native Vic Chesnutt for his set. The hour also features a repeat of Lucinda Williams' September 1998 appearance, which includes "Drunken Angel" and "Car Wheels on a Gravel Road."
50	24	Anggun, John Mellencamp	December 22, 1998
A set by John Mellencamp includes "Pink Houses" and "Lonely Ol' Night." Also: Indonesian singer Anggun performs "Selamanya" and "A Rose in the Wind." Host: David Byrne.
51	25	Best of Season II, Vol. I	December 29, 1998
A "best of" compilation that includes performances by Natalie Merchant, Lucinda Williams, Lyle Lovett, John Mellencamp, Randy Newman, P.J. Harvey, Lou Reed, Chocolate Genius, Steve Earle and Tori Amos. Host: David Byrne.
52	26	Best of Season II, Vol. II	January 5, 1999
A "best of" compilation includes performances by the Mavericks, Lyle Lovett, Elvis Costello and Burt Bacharach, the Brian Setzer Orchestra, Holly Cole, Jimmy Scott and Cowboy Junkies, as well as Angelique Kidjo, the Kronos Quartet with David Bryne, and the Balanescu Quartet.

=== Season 3 (1999–2000) ===
No. overall	No. in season	Performers	Original release date
53	1	Rubén Blades	September 25, 1999
Performances by salsa legend Rubén Blades, and Editus, a band of Costa Rican musicians. Host: John Hiatt.
54	2	Macy Gray, Sheryl Crow	October 8, 1999
Sheryl Crow and Macy Gray perform. Songs include "My Favorite Mistake," "There Goes the Neighborhood" and "It Don't Hurt" (Crow); and "I Try" and "Why Didn't You Call Me" (Gray). John Hiatt is the host.
55	3	Los Lobos, Diana Krall	October 17, 1999
Jazz singer Diana Krall plays a sensuous cat-and-mouse game of alternating hesitation and sustain vocally, while Los Lobos showcases their adventurous mix of rock, R&B, traditional Mexican folk and experimental sounds. Songs include "I've Got You Under My Skin," "This Time," "Peel Me a Grape," "Oh Yeah," "When I Look in Your Eyes" and "Kiko and the Lavender Moon."
56	4	Robert Cray, Kim Richey	October 22, 1999
Blues guitarist-singer Robert Cray and singer-songwriter Kim Richey perform. Songs include "24-7," "Can't Lose Them All," "Pardon," "I Know," "That Wasn't Me" and "I'm Alright." Host: John Hiatt.
57	5	Parliament-Funkadelic	October 30, 1999
The 20-piece R&B juggernaut Parliament/Funkadelic performs. Host: John Hiatt.
58	6	A Tribute To Gram Parsons	November 7, 1999
A tribute to Gram Parsons, a pioneering artist in alternative country music, features performances by host John Hiatt, Sheryl Crow, the Mavericks, Emmylou Harris, Whiskeytown, Gillian Welch, Steve Earle, Chris Hillman and Margot Timmons.
59	7	Branford Marsalis, Cesaria Evora	November 14, 1999
Jazz group the Branford Marsalis Quartet performs, as does Cesaria Evora, the Barefoot Diva from West Africa's Cape Verde Islands. Host: John Hiatt.
60	8	Dixie Chicks	November 21, 1999
Grammy-winning country-rock-bluegrass stars the Dixie Chicks (Natalie Maines, Martie Seidel and Emily Robison) perform and are interviewed by host John Hiatt.
61	9	Jewel Christmas special	November 28, 1999
A Christmas program by singer-songwriter Jewel includes "Joy to the World," "O Holy Night," "Ave Maria," "Winter Wonderland," "Hark! The Herald Angels Sing," "Face of Love," "Gospel Melody," "Rudolph the Red-Nosed Reindeer."
62	10	Parliament-Funkadelic, Cibo Matto	January 2, 2000
George Clinton's 20-piece funk juggernaut Parliament/Funkadelic plays a rousing set, and pop/hip-hop/jazz fusionists Cibo Matto perform with Sean Lennon and other guests. Host: John Hiatt.
63	11	John Prine	January 30, 2000
Folk-musician John Prine performs with support from Iris DeMent. John Hiatt is the host.
64	12	Ziggy Marley & the Melody Makers, Ben Harper & the Innocent Criminals	February 6, 2000
Performances by Ziggy Marley & the Melody Makers and Ben Harper & the Innocent Criminals. Host: John Hiatt.
65	13	Wilco, Patty Griffin	February 13, 2000
Wilco and Patty Griffin perform. Songs include "Outtasite (Outta Mind)," "Mary," "I'm Always in Love," "Flaming Red," "California Stars," "Peter Pan," "Nothing'severgonnastandinmyway," "Carry Me," "I Must Be High," "Silver Bell" and "My Darling."
66	14	Neville Brothers, Ottmar Liebert	February 21, 2000
Performers include the Neville Brothers and Ottmar Liebert. John Hiatt hosts.
67	15	Rollins Band, Speech	February 28, 2000
Performers include the Rollins Band (led by singer-spoken word artist Henry Rollins) and former Arrested Development front man Speech, who performs songs from his 1999 CD "Hoopla."
68	16	Marianne Faithfull	April 15, 2000
Singer Marianne Faithfull, whose dalliances with the rock elite in the 1960s are as widely known as her hits of that time, performs with an edgy band and tells fascinating stories. Songs include "Come and Stay with Me," "Broken English" and "Working Class Hero."
69	17	Chris Isaak, Kelly Willis	April 22, 2000
Rock crooner Chris Isaak (with his longtime band Silvertone) and country singer Kelly Willis perform. Songs include "Somebody's Crying," "Not Forgotten You," "Flying," "Heavenbound," "Baby Did a Bad, Bad Thing" and "What I Deserve."
70	18	Iggy Pop, Marc Ribot y Los Cubanos Postizos	April 30, 2000
From 2000: Iggy Pop and Marc Ribot y Los Cubanos Postizos perform. Veteran punker Iggy puts on a dynamic set that includes "Lust for Life," while Ribot's band plays a garage band version of Cuban music, highlighted by Ribot's guitar playing.
71	19	Mary Chapin Carpenter, John Hiatt	May 6, 2000
Singer-songwriters Mary Chapin Carpenter and John Hiatt perform. Four-time Grammy winner Carpenter's set includes "The Hard Way"; Hiatt sings "Memphis in the Meantime" with his band the Goners, reunited for the first time in a decade.
72	20	The Cranberries, Moby	May 14, 2000
Irish rockers the Cranberries and techno artist Moby perform. The Cranberries' set includes "Dreams," "Linger" and "Zombie," while Moby plays "Natural Blues" and "Bodyrock." Host: John Hiatt.
73	21	Willie Nelson	May 21, 2000
Willie Nelson performs with a seven-piece band. Songs include "Crazy," "Night Life," "On the Road Again," "'Til I Gain Control Again," "Funny How Time Slips Away" and "Pancho and Lefty."
74	22	G. Love and Special Sauce, Sheryl Crow	May 28, 2000
G. Love and Special Sauce and Sheryl Crow perform at New York's Sony Studios. Host: John Hiatt.
75	23	Latin Playboys, Ziggy Marley	June 11, 2000
Avant garde roots-rockers the Latin Playboys (featuring David Hidalgo and Louie Perez of Los Lobos) and reggae stars Ziggy Marley and the Melody Makers perform. Host: John Hiatt.
76	24	Mandy Barnett, Chris Isaak	June 18, 2000
Mandy Barnett and Chris Isaak perform. Host: John Hiatt.
77	25	Diana Krall, Mark Isham	June 18, 2000
Jazz performances from vocalist Diana Krall and trumpeter Mark Isham. Isham plays Miles Davis compositions from his tribute CD; Krall's set includes "Under My Skin," "I Love Being Here with You," "Lost Mind," "Peel Me a Grape" and "When I Look in Your Eyes."
78	26	Best of Season III, Vol. I	July 22, 2000
A "best of" episode includes Moby, Macy Gray, Ruben Blades, Branford Marsalis, Patty Griffin, the Rollins Band, John Prine, Ben Harper, Emmylou Harris and Ryan Adams.
79	27	Best of Season III, Vol. II	July 29, 2000
The conclusion of a two-part "best of" compilation includes Ziggy Marley and the Melody Makers, Cesaria Evora, Los Lobos, Wilco, Kim Richey, Chris Isaak, Sheryl Crow, Diana Krall, Dixie Chicks, John Hiatt, Iggy Pop and Jewel.

== Releases ==
=== CD releases ===
Release date	Title	Artists	Label
September 4, 2001	The Best of Sessions at West 54th	Sheryl Crow David Byrne; John Hiatt; Ben Folds Five; Natalie Merchant; Suzanne Vega; The Mavericks; Richard Thompson; Ani DiFranco; Elvis Costello and Burt Bacharach; Shawn Colvin; Emmylou Harris; Sinéad O'Connor; Lou Reed	Sony
July 13, 2018	The Complete Sessions at West 54th	Ben Folds Five	Real Gone Music
Oct 7, 1997	Sessions at West 54th	Suzanne Vega	A&M Records

=== DVD releases ===
Release date	Title	Artists	Label
December 10, 1997	The Best of Sessions at West 54th Volume 1	Wynton Marsalis with the Lincoln Center Jazz Orchestra Suzanne Vega; Richard Thompson; Shawn Colvin; Ani DiFranco; Nil Lara; Rickie Lee Jones; Daniel Lanois; Emmylou Harris; Ben Folds Five; Keb' Mo'; Sinéad O'Connor; Yo-Yo Ma; Patti Smith; Jane Siberry	Columbia Music Video
December 5, 2000	Sessions at West 54th: Recorded Live in New York	Keb' Mo'	Sony Pictures
December 19, 2000	Sessions at West 54th	Neil Finn	Sony Pictures
March 13, 2001	The Best of Sessions at West 54th Volume 2	The Mavericks Imani Coppola; Kronos Quartet; Neil Finn; Lyle Lovett; Afro-Cuban All Stars; Natalie Merchant; John Hiatt; Randy Newman; Ozomatli; Lucinda Williams; Steve Earle; Elvis Costello & Burt Bacharach; Lou Reed	Columbia Music Video
September 11, 2001	John Prine - Live from Sessions at West 54th	John Prine	Oh Boy Records Music Video
October 9, 2001	Ben Folds Five – The Complete Sessions at West 54th	Ben Folds Five	Epic Music Video

=== VHS Releases ===
Release date	Title	Artists	Label
December 8, 1998	Painted from Memory: Sessions at West 54th	Elvis Costello and Burt Bacharach	Polygram Music Video
