= Close-Up Vol. 2, People & Places =

Studio album by Suzanne Vega
- Released: October 12, 2010
- Genre: Acoustic
- Length: 48:06
- Label: Amanuensis Productions

Suzanne Vega chronology
Close-Up Vol. 1, Love Songs (2010)	Close-Up Vol. 2, People & Places (2010)	Close-Up Vol. 3, States of Being (2011)

Professional ratings
Review scores
Source	Rating
Allmusic	3.5/5 stars

Close-Up Vol. 2, People & Places is the ninth studio album released by American singer-songwriter Suzanne Vega. The album consists of re-recordings of songs from Vega's back catalogue with stripped-down arrangements that highlight her lyrics and melodies. The track "The Man Who Played God" was included in its original version on the album Dark Night of the Soul, by Danger Mouse and Sparklehorse.

== Track listing ==
All tracks are written by Suzanne Vega, except where noted.

No.	Title	Writer(s)	Original album	Length
1.	"Luka"		Solitude Standing (1987)	3:13
2.	"Zephyr & I"		Beauty & Crime (2007)	3:09
3.	"New York Is a Woman"		Beauty & Crime	2:59
4.	"In Liverpool"		99.9F° (1992)	4:50
5.	"Calypso"		Solitude Standing	3:45
6.	"Fat Man and Dancing Girl"	Vega, Mitchell Froom	99.9F°	2:18
7.	"The Queen and the Soldier"		Suzanne Vega (1985)	5:03
8.	"Rock in This Pocket (Song of David)"		99.9F°	3:40
9.	"Angel's Doorway"		Beauty & Crime	2:53
10.	"Ironbound/Fancy Poultry"	Vega, Anton Sanko	Solitude Standing	5:01
11.	"Neighborhood Girls"		Suzanne Vega	3:32
12.	"Tom's Diner"		Solitude Standing	4:34
13.	"The Man Who Played God"	Danger Mouse, Mark Linkous, Vega		3:08
Total length:				48:06

SuzanneVega.com bonus tracks
No.	Title	Writer(s)	Original album	Length
14.	"Song of Sand"		99.9F°	3:07
15.	"Room off the Street"	Vega, Sanko	Days of Open Hand (1990)	3:00
16.	"Wooden Horse (Casper Hauser’s Song)"	Vega, Michael Visceglia, Sanko, Marc Shulman, Stephen Ferrera	Solitude Standing	4:26
17.	"Priscilla"		Songs in Red and Gray (2001)	3:45
18.	"Frank and Ava"		Beauty & Crime	2:41
19.	"Luka" (en Español)		Solitude Standing	3:22
Total length:				68:27

iTunes and Amazon.com bonus tracks
No.	Title	Writer(s)	Original album	Length
14.	"Song of Sand"		99.9F°	3:07
15.	"Priscilla"		Songs in Red and Gray	3:45
16.	"Wooden Horse (Caspar Hauser’s Song)"	Vega, Michael Visceglia, Sanko, Marc Shulman, Stephen Ferrera	Solitude Standing	4:26
17.	"Luka" (en Español)		Solitude Standing	3:22
Total length:				62:46

== Personnel ==
- Suzanne Vega: vocals, acoustic guitar, producer, liner notes
- Gerry Leonard: electric & acoustic guitar, cello arrangement (7), additional arrangement
- Mike Visceglia: bass, cello arrangement (7), additional arrangement
- Karl Berger: string arrangement
- Ruby Froom: backing vocals
- Bob Ludwig: mastering
- Doug Yowell: percussion
- Brooklyn Rider: string quartet

== Charts ==
Chart (2010)	Peak position
French Albums (SNEP)	199
US Americana/Folk Albums (Billboard)	10
US Top Current Albums (Billboard)	186
