= John Prine - Live from Sessions at West 54th =

- Starring: John Prine, Iris DeMent
- Production company: Oh Boy Records
- Release date: 2001
- Country: United States
- Language: English

John Prine - Live from Sessions at West 54th is a live concert DVD released by Oh Boy Records in 2001. It was recorded for the Sessions at West 54th television show, and features a guest performance by Iris Dement. The DVD release offers songs not shown during the half-hour television segment, as well as interviews with show host John Hiatt. DVD special features include a biography and discography. This DVD is one of the first releases from an independent label to be mixed in 5.1 Dolby Surround Sound.

== Track listing ==
All songs written by John Prine (except where indicated):

1. "Spanish Pipe Dream" (indicated as "Blow Up Your T.V." on DVD case)
2. "Six O'Clock News"
3. "Souvenirs"
4. "Far from Me"
5. "All the Best"
6. "Milwaukee Here I Come" (with Iris DeMent) (Lee Fykes)
7. "(We're Not) The Jet Set" (with Iris DeMent) (Bobby Braddock)
8. "Let's Invite Them Over Again" (with Iris DeMent) (Onie Wheeler)
9. "When Two Worlds Collide" (with Iris DeMent) (Bill Anderson, Roger Miller)
10. "In Spite of Ourselves" (with Iris DeMent)
11. "Sam Stone"
12. "Lake Marie"
13. "Hello in There"
