= Suzanne Vega =

American singer-songwriter (born 1959)

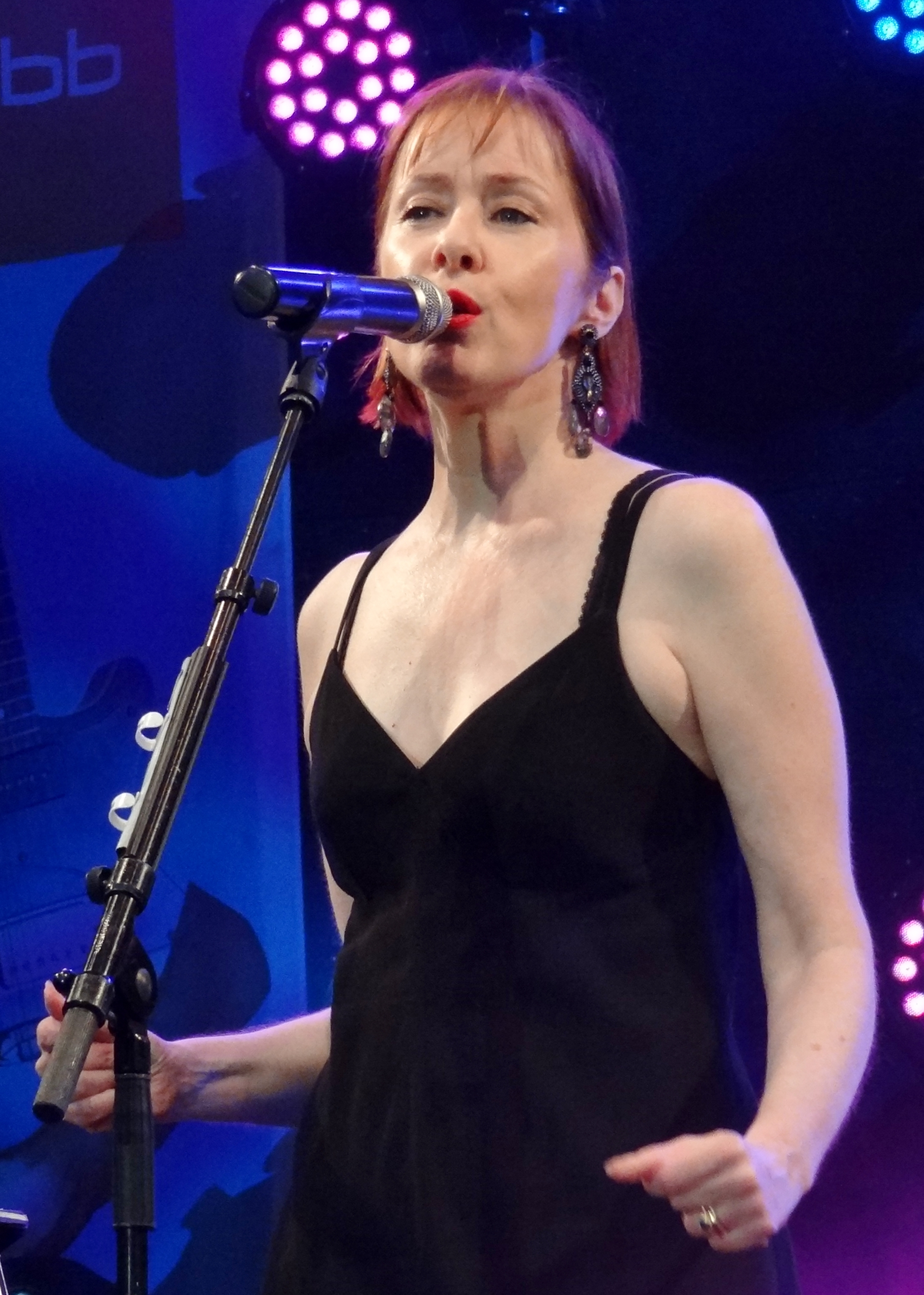
- Vega performing at the Inselleuchten-Festival in Marienwerder, Brandenburg, 2016

Background information
- Born: Suzanne Nadine Peck; July 11, 1959 (age 67); Santa Monica, California, U.S.
- Origin: New York City, U.S.
- Genres: Alternative rock; folk rock; pop rock; art pop
- Occupations: Singer-songwriter; musician
- Instruments: Vocals; guitar
- Works: Discography
- Years active: 1982–present
- Labels: Cooking Vinyl; A&M; Blue Note; Amanuensis Productions
- Spouses: Mitchell Froom (m. 1995; div. 1998) Paul Mills (m. 2006)
- Website: suzannevega.com

Suzanne Nadine Vega (née Peck; born July 11, 1959) is an American singer-songwriter of folk-inspired music. Vega's music career spans 40 years. In the mid-1980s and 1990s, she released four singles that entered the Top 40 on the UK singles chart, "Marlene on the Wall", "Left of Center", "Luka" and "No Cheap Thrill".

"Tom's Diner", which was originally released as an a cappella recording on Vega's second studio album, Solitude Standing (1987), was remixed in 1990 as a dance track by English electronic music producers DNA with her vocals. It became a Top 10 hit in five countries. The original a cappella recording of the song was used as a test during the creation of the MP3 format. The role of her song in the development of the MP3 compression prompted Vega to be given the title of "The Mother of the MP3".

Vega is regarded as influential and revered by music critics for her cool vocal delivery, unique arrangements and observational and metaphorical lyricism. Her artistry is often credited for paving the way for the breakthrough of folk-styled singer-songwriters of the 90s. Contemporary artists including Adele and Dev Hynes cite Vega as an influence.

Vega has released ten studio albums; her most recent release is the studio album Flying with Angels, released on May 2, 2025, by Cooking Vinyl.

== Early life ==
Suzanne Nadine Vega was born on July 11, 1959, in Santa Monica, California. Her parents divorced soon after her birth. Her mother, Pat Vega (née Schumacher), was a computer systems analyst of German-Swedish heritage. Her father, Richard Peck, is of English, Irish and Scottish origin. Her stepfather, Edgardo Vega Yunqué, also known as Ed Vega, was a novelist and professor from Puerto Rico. When Vega was two and a half, her family moved to New York City. She grew up in Spanish Harlem and the Upper West Side. She was not aware that Peck was her biological father until she was nine years old. Vega and Peck met for the first time in her late 20s and remain in contact.

She attended the High School of Performing Arts (since renamed Fiorello H. LaGuardia High School) where she studied modern dance and graduated in 1977.

== Career ==
=== 1980s ===
While majoring in English literature at Barnard College, she performed in small venues in Greenwich Village, where she was a regular contributor to Jack Hardy's Monday night songwriters' group at the Cornelia Street Cafe and had some of her first songs published on Fast Folk anthology albums. In 1984, she received a major label recording contract, making her one of the first Fast Folk artists to break out on a major label.

Vega's eponymous debut studio album was released on May 1, 1985, by A&M Records and was well received by critics in the U.S.; it reached platinum status in the United Kingdom. Produced by Lenny Kaye and Steve Addabbo, the songs feature Vega's acoustic guitar in straightforward arrangements which deviated from the prevailing trends of the time. A music video was released for the album's song "Marlene on the Wall", which went into MTV and VH1's rotations. During this period Vega also wrote lyrics and sang vocals for two songs, "Lightning" and "Freezing", on the 1986 studio album Songs from Liquid Days by composer and pianist Philip Glass.

Vega's song "Left of Center", co-written with Steve Addabbo, was released as part of the soundtrack to the John Hughes film Pretty in Pink (1986). It features British musician Joe Jackson on piano and was released as a single in May 1986, reaching No. 32 on the UK singles chart.

In 1986, she was interviewed by Lou Reed on 120 Minutes to promote a Greenpeace benefit concert, which led to them becoming friends. After Reed's death in 2013, Vega has covered "Walk on the Wild Side" at all of her live concerts since as a tribute.

Her next studio album, Solitude Standing (1987), received critical and commercial success and sold over one million copies in the U.S. It includes the international hit single "Luka" which is written about, and from the point of view of, an abused child. Many years later Vega revealed that the song dealt with the abuse that she herself had suffered from her stepfather. While continuing a focus on Vega's acoustic guitar, the music of her second album is more strongly pop-oriented and features fuller arrangements. Following the success of the album, in 1989 Vega became the first female artist to headline the Glastonbury Festival. Vega performed her set whilst wearing a bulletproof vest, her band having received death threats from an obsessed fan ahead of the festival.

The a cappella "Tom's Diner" from Solitude Standing became a hit in 1990, having been remixed by two English electronic music producers under the name DNA. The track was originally a bootleg until Vega allowed DNA to release it through her record company. It became her biggest hit.

=== 1990s ===
Vega's third studio album, Days of Open Hand (1990), combines Vega's established folk rock style with more varied instrumentation such as the ney and dumbec and experimental arrangements. High-profile contributors to the album include Philip Glass, Shawn Colvin, and John Linnell of They Might Be Giants. The album saw greater use of synthesizers and samplers than Vega's previous studio albums; these included the digital Fairlight CMI and analog Voyetra-8.

In 1992, she released her fourth studio album, 99.9F°, which mixed folk and pop music with electronic elements. The album was awarded gold status by the RIAA in recognition of selling over 500,000 copies in the U.S. The single "Blood Makes Noise" from the album peaked at number-one on Billboard's Modern Rock Tracks. Vega later married the album's producer, Mitchell Froom.

Her fifth studio album, Nine Objects of Desire, was released in 1996. The music varies between a frugal and simple style and the industrial production of 99.9F°. The album contains "Caramel", featured in the romantic comedy film The Truth About Cats & Dogs (1996) and later the trailer for the romantic drama film Closer (2004). A song not included on the album, "Woman on the Tier", was featured on the soundtrack of the crime drama film Dead Man Walking (1996).

In 1997 she took a singing part on the concept album Heaven & Hell, a musical interpretation of the seven deadly sins by her colleague Joe Jackson with whom she had already collaborated in 1986 on "Left of Center".

In 1999, Avon Books published Vega's book The Passionate Eye: The Collected Writings of Suzanne Vega, a volume of poems, lyrics, essays and journalistic pieces.

=== 2000s ===
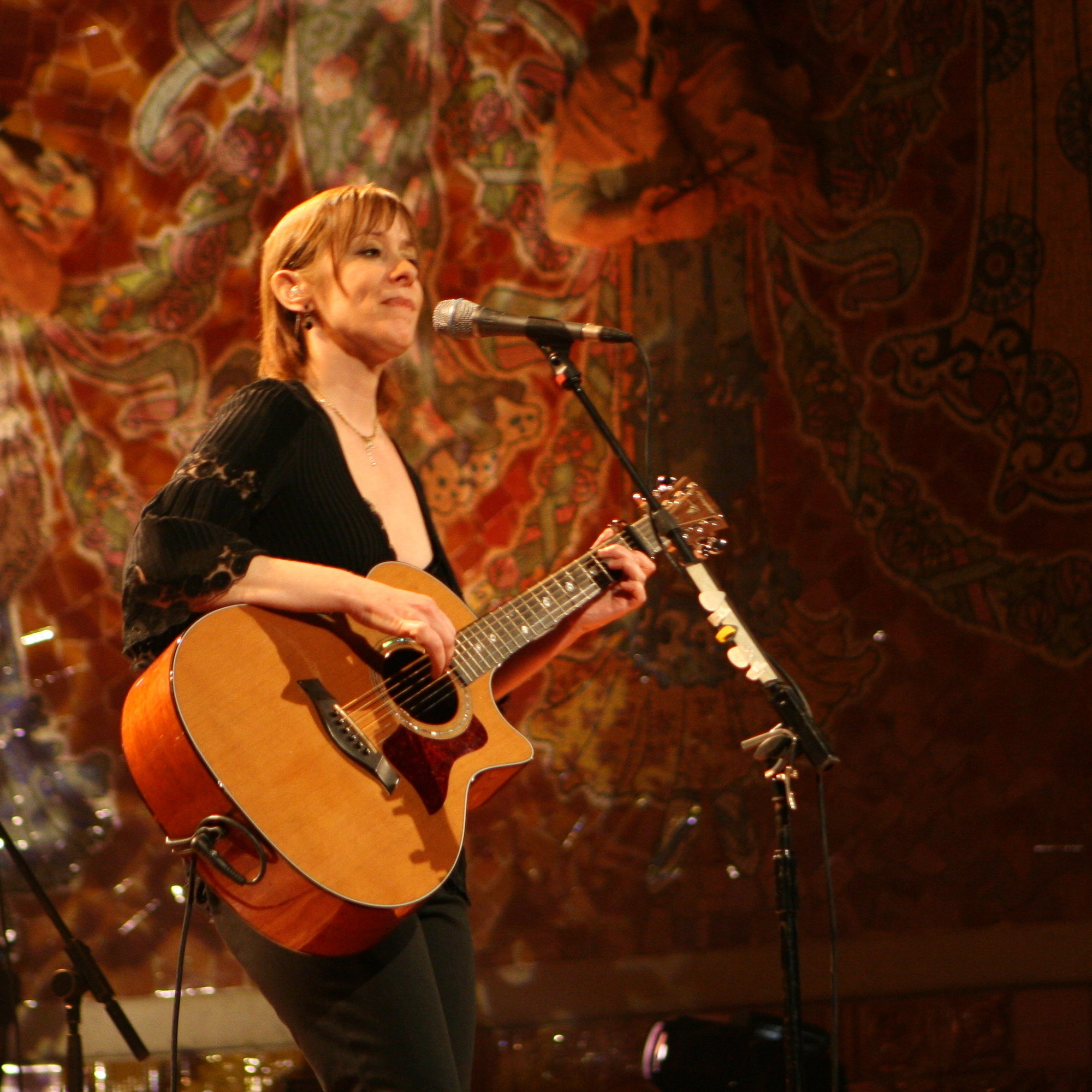
Vega performing at Palau de la Música Catalana in Barcelona, Spain, 2008

In September 2001, Vega released her sixth studio album Songs in Red and Gray, which was her final release for A&M Records. Three songs deal with Vega's divorce from her first husband, Mitchell Froom.

At the memorial concert for her brother Tim Vega in December 2002, Vega began her role as the subject of the direct-cinema documentary Some Journey directed by Christopher Seufert. The documentary has not yet been released.

Underground hip-hop duo Felt named a track "Suzanne Vega" on their debut studio album Felt: A Tribute to Christina Ricci, released in 2002.

In 2003, the 21-song greatest hits compilation album Retrospective: The Best of Suzanne Vega was released. (The UK version of Retrospective included an eight-song bonus CD as well as a DVD containing 12 songs). In the same year she was invited by Grammy Award-winning jazz guitarist Bill Frisell to play at the Century of Song concerts at the Ruhrtriennale in Ruhr, Germany.

In 2003, she hosted the American Public Media radio series American Mavericks, about 20th century American composers, which received the Peabody Award for Excellence in Broadcasting.

On August 3, 2006, Vega became the first major recording artist to perform live in the Internet-based virtual world Second Life. The event was hosted by John Hockenberry of public radio's The Infinite Mind.

On September 17, 2006, she performed in Central Park as part of a benefit concert for the Save Darfur Coalition. During the concert she highlighted her support for Amnesty International of which she has been a member since 1988.

In early October 2006, Vega participated in the Academia Film Olomouc (AFO) in Olomouc, the Czech Republic, the oldest festival of documentary films in Europe, in which she appeared as a main guest. She was invited there as the subject of the documentary film by director Christopher Seufert which had a test screening at the festival. At the end of the festival she performed her classic songs and added one brand new piece called "New York Is a Woman".

Vega is interviewed in the book Everything Is Just a Bet which was published in Czech in October 2006. The book contains 12 interview transcriptions from the talk show called Stage Talks that regularly runs in the Švandovo divadlo (Švandovo Theatre) in Prague. Vega introduced the book to the audience of the Švandovo divadlo (Švandovo Theatre), and together with some other Czech celebrities gave a signing session.

She signed a new recording contract with Blue Note Records in 2006 and released Beauty & Crime on July 17, 2007. The album, produced by Jimmy Hogarth, won a Grammy Award for Best Engineered Album, Non-Classical. Her contract was not renewed and she was released in June 2008.

In 2007, Vega followed the lead of numerous other mainstream artists and released her track "Pornographer's Dream" as podsafe. The song spent two weeks at number-one during 2007 and finished as the No. 11 hit of the year on the PMC Top10's annual countdown.

Vega was a member of the Annual Independent Music Awards judging panel in multiple years, from the 6th through to the 14th iterations.

In 2008, a fire that broke out on the backlot of Universal Studios Hollywood in Los Angeles County, California, resulted in the loss or damage of some Vega recordings.

=== 2010s ===
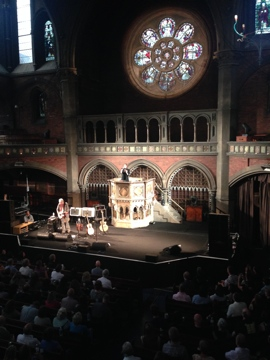
Vega performing at Union Chapel in Islington, London, 2015, improvising by using the pulpit

A partial cover version of her song "Tom's Diner" was used to introduce the British crime thriller film 4.3.2.1. (2010), with its lyrics largely rewritten to echo the plot. This musical hybrid was released as "Keep Moving". Vega participated in the Danger Mouse and Sparklehorse studio album Dark Night of the Soul (2010). She wrote both melody and lyrics for her song "Man Who Played God", inspired by a biography of the Spanish artist Pablo Picasso. Vega sang lead vocals on the song "Now I Am an Arsonist" with singer-songwriter Jonathan Coulton on his eighth studio album, Artificial Heart (2011).

Vega has re-recorded her back-catalogue, both for artistic and commercial (and control) reasons, in the Close-Up series. Vol. 1 (Love Songs) and Vol. 2 (People & Places) appeared in 2010 while Vol. 3 (States of Being) was released in July 2011 followed by Vol. 4 (Songs of Family) in September 2012. Volumes 2, 3 and 4 of the Close-Up albums included previously unrecorded material; Volumes 2 and 3 each included one new collaboratively written song, while Volume 4 included three songs that Vega had written years earlier but had not previously recorded. In all, Vega's Close-Up series features 60 re-recorded songs and five new compositions representing about three-quarters of her lifetime songwriting output.

While performing live, Vega and long-term collaborator Gerry Leonard began to introduce a number of new songs into the setlist, including the live favorite "I Never Wear White". Over the course of a year, the songs were completed and recorded in a live-studio setting with the help of a number of guests. Produced by Leonard, Tales from the Realm of the Queen of Pentacles was released in February 2014. It was her first album of new material in seven years and became Vega's first studio album to reach the UK Top 40 since 1992, peaking at No. 37.

Vega's ninth studio album, Lover, Beloved: Songs from an Evening with Carson McCullers, was released on October 14, 2016.

=== 2020s ===
In February and March 2023, Vega toured the UK. On May 2, 2025, Vega released her tenth studio album Flying with Angels. This was followed by a European tour.

== Songwriting ==
At the age of nine she began to write poetry. She was encouraged to do so by her stepfather. It took her three years to write her first song, "Brother Mine", which was finished at the age of 14. It was first published on Close-Up Vol. 4, Songs of Family (2012), along with her other early song, "The Silver Lady".

Vega has not learned to read musical notation; she sees the melody as a shape and chords as colors. She focuses on lyrics and melodic ideas; for advanced features – like intros or bridges – she relies on other artists with whom she works. Most of her albums, except the first one, were made in such cooperation.

Vega finishes about 80% of the songs she starts writing. She got the melody of "Tom's Diner" while walking down Broadway in New York City. She was thinking of French New Wave films.

The most important artistic influences on her work come from Lou Reed, Bob Dylan and Leonard Cohen. Some other important artists for her are Paul Simon and Laura Nyro.

== Guitars ==
Vega currently plays Furch Guitars, a brand made in the Czech Republic, and her song "Tom's Diner" was the focus of a win-a-guitar competition run by Furch in 2021. In the mid-1980s she played Guild guitars, and in the 1990s she played Yamaha and Taylor guitars at different times.

== Books ==
In 1998, she released the book The Passionate Eye: The Collected Writing of Suzanne Vega. In 2014, Vega wrote the foreword for a book about the singer, songwriter, and poet Leonard Cohen, Leonard Cohen on Leonard Cohen.

== Theater ==
Vega and Duncan Sheik wrote a play, Carson McCullers Talks About Love, about the life of the writer Carson McCullers. In the play, directed by Kay Matschullat and premiered in 2011, Vega alternates between monologue and songs. Vega and Sheik were nominated for Outstanding Music in a Play for the 57th annual Drama Desk awards.

The studio album Lover, Beloved: Songs from an Evening with Carson McCullers, based on the play, was released in 2016. Vega considers it to be a third version, because it's rewritten, and she made the first version in college.

In early 2020, Vega played the role of "Band Leader" in an off-Broadway musical based on the comedy-drama film Bob & Carol & Ted & Alice (1969), directed by Scott Elliott and produced at The New Group in New York City. She replaced Sheik, who wrote the show's music and co-wrote the lyrics with Amanda Green. In his review for The New York Times, critic Ben Brantley called the "brandy-voiced" Vega "a delightful, smoothly sardonic presence."

== Amanuensis Productions ==
Vega established her own record label after the 2008 financial crisis. From that point, she stopped working for Blue Note Records and started thinking about re-recording her back catalog with new arrangements and gaining control over her works (which she eventually did with the 2014 Close-Up Series).

The name "Amanuensis Productions" was meant as a private joke about "servant" (amanuensis) owning the "masters" (recording masters), also a pun at A&M still legally owning her previous master tapes.

Running the label proved to be harder than she expected. In 2015, it barely "broke even", but new licenses were coming for "Tom's Diner".

== Personal life ==
On March 17, 1995, Vega married Mitchell Froom, a musician and a record producer (who played on and produced 99.9F° and Nine Objects of Desire). They have a daughter, Ruby Froom (born July 8, 1994). The alternative rock band Soul Coughing's debut studio album Ruby Vroom (1994) was named after her, with Vega's approval. Vega and Froom separated and divorced in 1998.

On February 11, 2006, Vega married Paul Mills, a lawyer and poet, "22 years after he first proposed to her". In 1977, at the age of 27, Mills, then a young poet who went by "Poez", dated Vega for a time, but when she was ambivalent about his marriage proposal he moved to California to become a lawyer. In 2005, their paths crossed again and he moved back to New York to refocus on his poetry. They married the following year.

Beginning in 2010, Ruby Froom has occasionally performed with her mother on tour.

Vega practices Nichiren Buddhism and is a member of the American branch of the worldwide Buddhist association Soka Gakkai International.

== Awards and nominations ==
Year	Awards	Work	Category	Result
1985	Billboard Music Awards	Herself	Top Billboard 200 Artist – Female	Nominated
1987	Billboard Music Awards	Herself	Top Billboard 200 Artist – Female	Nominated
1987	Billboard Music Awards	Herself	Top Billboard 200 Artist	Nominated
1987	Billboard Music Awards	Herself	Top Hot 100 Artist	Nominated
1987	Billboard Music Awards	Herself	Top Hot 100 Artist – Female	Nominated
1987	Billboard Music Awards	Solitude Standing	Top Billboard 200 Album	Nominated
1987	Billboard Music Awards	Solitude Standing	Top Pop Compact Disk	Nominated
1987	Billboard Music Awards	"Luka"	Top Hot 100 Song	Nominated
1987	NME Awards	Herself	Best Female Singer	Won
1988	Pollstar Concert Industry Awards	Herself	Small Hall Tour of the Year	Nominated
1988	ASCAP Pop Music Awards	"Luka"	Most Performed Song	Won
1988	MTV Video Music Awards	"Luka"	Best Female Video	Won
1988	MTV Video Music Awards	"Luka"	Breakthrough Video	Nominated
1988	MTV Video Music Awards	"Luka"	Best Cinematography	Nominated
1988	Grammy Awards	"Luka"	Song of the Year	Nominated
1988	Grammy Awards	"Luka"	Record of the Year	Nominated
1988	Grammy Awards	"Luka"	Best Female Pop Vocal Performance	Nominated
1990	Grammy Awards	Days of Open Hand	Best Contemporary Folk Recording	Nominated
1990	Grammy Awards	Days of Open Hand	Best Album Package	Won
1992	Billboard Music Video Awards	"Blood Makes Noise"	Best Pop/Rock Female Video	Nominated
1993	New York Music Awards	99.9F°	Best Rock Album	Won
1993	Hit Awards (Hong Kong)	Herself	Top Female Artist	Nominated
1996	Žebřík Music Awards	Herself	Best International Female	Nominated
2003	Glamour Awards	Herself	Woman of the Year	Won
2004	Peabody Awards	Herself	Entertainment	Won
2008	Grammy Awards	Beauty & Crime	Best Engineered Album, Non-Classical	Won
2010	New York Music Awards	Close-Up Vol. 1, Love Songs	Best Pop/Rock Compilation	Won
2012	Drama Desk Awards	Carson McCullers Talks About Love	Outstanding Music in a Play	Nominated

== Discography ==
Studio albums

- Suzanne Vega (1985)
- Solitude Standing (1987)
- Days of Open Hand (1990)
- 99.9F° (1992)
- Nine Objects of Desire (1996)
- Songs in Red and Gray (2001)
- Beauty & Crime (2007)
- Tales from the Realm of the Queen of Pentacles (2014)
- Lover, Beloved: Songs from an Evening with Carson McCullers (2016)
- Flying with Angels (2025)

Live albums

- Live in London 1986 (1986)
- Sessions at West 54th (1997)
- Solitude Standing: Live at the Barbican (2013)
- Live at the Speakeasy (2014)
- An Evening of New York Songs and Stories (2020)

== Books ==
- The Passionate Eye: The Collected Writing of Suzanne Vega (1999) ISBN 9780380973538.
