= Solitude Standing (song) =

Single by Suzanne Vega

from the album Solitude Standing
- B-side: "Ironbound/Fancy Poultry"
- Released: August 1987
- Genre: Alternative pop
- Length: 4:49
- Label: A&M
- Songwriters: Suzanne Vega; Michael Visceglia; Anton Sanko; Marc Shulman; Stephen Ferrera
- Producers: Steve Addabbo; Lenny Kaye

Suzanne Vega singles chronology
"Tom's Diner" (1987)	"Solitude Standing" (1987)	"Book of Dreams" (1990)

Music video
- "Solitude Standing" on YouTube

"Solitude Standing" is a song by American singer-songwriter Suzanne Vega. It was released on April 1, 1987 by A&M Records as the title track to her second studio album and as the album's fourth and final single in August of that year. The song became the second of three songs by Vega to crack the U.S. Billboard Hot 100, following the top 5 hit "Luka".

== Background ==
Vega wrote "Solitude Standing" in collaboration with her backing band, as opposed to previous works which were written alone. Lyrically, the song personifies "solitude" as a woman, whom Vega described as "a third character in a relationship".

Upon its release as a single, "Solitude Standing" peaked at number 94 in the U.S. On the UK singles chart, it peaked at number 79.

== Track listing ==
1. "Solitude Standing" (Suzanne Vega, Michael Visceglia, Anton Sanko, Marc Shulman, Stephen Ferrera) – 4:34
2. "Ironbound/Fancy Poultry" (Vega, Sanko) – 6:17

== Personnel ==
- Suzanne Vega – vocals, acoustic guitar
- Michael Visceglia – bass guitar
- Anton Sanko – synthesizer
- Marc Shulman – electric guitar
- Stephen Ferrera – drums, percussion

== Charts ==
Chart performance for "Solitude Standing"
Chart (1987)	Peak position
Australia (Kent Music Report)	91
New Zealand (Recorded Music NZ)	45
UK Singles (OCC)	79
U.S. Billboard Hot 100	94
U.S. Album Rock Tracks (Billboard)	43
