= Close-Up Vol. 4, Songs of Family =

Studio album by Suzanne Vega
- Released: September 21, 2012
- Genre: Acoustic
- Length: 47:43
- Label: Amanuensis Productions
- Producer: Suzanne Vega

Suzanne Vega chronology
Close-Up Vol. 3, States of Being (2011)	Close-Up Vol. 4, Songs of Family (2012)	Tales from the Realm of the Queen of Pentacles (2014)

Professional ratings
Review scores
Source	Rating
AllMusic	3.5/5 stars

Close-Up Vol. 4, Songs of Family is the eleventh studio album by American singer-songwriter Suzanne Vega . The album consists of re-recordings of songs from Vega's back catalogue with stripped-down arrangements that highlight her lyrics and melodies. Two of the songs, "Brother Mine" and "The Silver Lady", are songs Vega wrote more than 30 years ago, but are only now seeing an official recording and release. "Daddy is White" is a song she wrote back in 2007, previously only existing as a demo attached to an article in The New York Times titled "Which Side Are You On?" she wrote in 2008. "Pilgrimage" was recorded in October 2011.

== Track listing ==
All tracks are written by Suzanne Vega, except where noted.

No.	Title	Writer(s)	Original album	Length
1.	"Rosemary"		Tried and True (1998)	2:54
2.	"Honeymoon Suite"		Nine Objects of Desire (1996)	3:13
3.	"World Before Columbus"		Nine Objects of Desire (1996)	3:00
4.	"As You Are Now"		Beauty & Crime (2007)	2:28
5.	"Soap And Water"		Songs in Red and Gray (2001)	2:52
6.	"Widow's Walk"		Songs in Red and Gray (2001)	3:42
7.	"Blood Sings"		99.9F° (1992)	3:20
8.	"Bad Wisdom"		99.9F° (1992)	3:10
9.	"Ludlow Street"		Beauty & Crime (2007)	3:11
10.	"Tired Of Sleeping"		Days of Open Hand (1990)	3:47
11.	"Pilgrimage"	Vega, Anton Sanko	Days of Open Hand (1990)	4:26
12.	"Brother Mine"		previously unreleased	3:14
13.	"The Silver Lady"		previously unreleased	5:35
14.	"Daddy Is White"		previously unreleased	2:44

== Charts ==
Chart (2012)	Peak position
Belgian Albums (Ultratop Flanders)	160
