= Live in London 1986 =

Live album by Suzanne Vega
- Released: 1986
- Recorded: April 27, 1986
- Venue: Piccadilly Theatre, Westminster, London
- Genre: Folk rock, acoustic rock
- Label: A&M Records

Live in London 1986 is a live album by the American singer-songwriter Suzanne Vega. It was recorded April 27, 1986, and was released on both Vinyl and CD. It registered at #93 on Australian music charts.

== Track listing ==
1. "Left of Centre"
2. "Neighborhood Girls"
3. "Straight Lines"
4. "Black Widow Station"
5. "Knight Moves"
6. "Cracking"
