= Live at the Speakeasy =

Live album by Suzanne Vega
- Released: 20 October 2014
- Recorded: 17 April 1985
- Venue: SpeakEasy club in Greenwich Village
- Genres: Folk rock, acoustic rock
- Length: 57 min
- Label: All Access

Live at the Speakeasy is a live album by the American singer-songwriter Suzanne Vega. Originally a radio broadcast of a solo performance, it was recorded 17 April 1985 at SpeakEasy club in Greenwich Village, the week her debut album Suzanne Vega appeared on the market. This recording was released 20 October 2014.

== Track listing ==
1. "Introduction" 1:24
2. "Tom's Diner" 3:10
3. "Small Blue Thing" 4:04
4. "Some Journey" 5:11
5. "Cracking" 3:10
6. "The Queen and the Soldier" 5:59
7. "Knight Moves" 4:36
8. "Freeze Tag" 5:50
9. "Marlene On The Wall" 4:26
10. "Undertow" 4:14
11. "Straight Lines" 5:38
12. "Neighborhood Girls" 4:24
13. "Gypsy" 4:11
