= Lover, Beloved: Songs from an Evening with Carson McCullers =

Studio album by Suzanne Vega
- Released: October 14, 2016
- Studio: Sneaky
- Genre: Folk rock
- Length: 33:02
- Label: Amanuensis Productions
- Producer: Gerry Leonard

Suzanne Vega chronology
Close-Up Series (2014)	Lover, Beloved: Songs from an Evening with Carson McCullers (2016)	An Evening of New York Songs and Stories (2020)

Singles from Lover, Beloved: Songs from an Evening with Carson McCullers
- 1. "We of Me" Released: July 6, 2016

Professional ratings
Review scores
Source	Rating
AllMusic	3.5/5 stars
Rolling Stone	3/5 stars

Lover, Beloved: Songs from an Evening with Carson McCullers is the ninth studio album by the American singer-songwriter Suzanne Vega, which was released on October 14, 2016. The album is based on the 2011 play Carson McCullers Talks About Love about the life of the writer Carson McCullers, written and performed by Vega.

== Background ==
When she was 15, Vega read the books of Carson McCullers and has been fascinated by her ever since.

She wrote eight songs with Duncan Sheik and two with Michael Jefry Stevens. Some writing was done in the Metropolitan Museum of Art.

== Track listing ==
All tracks are written by Suzanne Vega and Duncan Sheik except "Carson's Blues" and "The Ballad of Miss Amelia" written by Vega and Michael Jefry Stevens.

Lover, Beloved: Songs from an Evening with Carson McCullers track listing
No.	Title	Length
1.	"Carson's Blues"	2:55
2.	"New York Is My Destination"	3:09
3.	"Instant of the Hour After"	3:06
4.	"We of Me"	2:52
5.	"Annemarie"	3:18
6.	"12 Mortal Men"	2:47
7.	"Harper Lee"	3:43
8.	"Lover, Beloved"	3:24
9.	"The Ballad of Miss Amelia"	4:18
10.	"Carson's Last Supper"	3:30
Total length:		33:02

Note: "Instant of the Hour After" first appeared on Close-Up Vol. 3, States of Being (2011).

== Music video ==
Official music video for a song "We of Me" has been directed by Chuck Moore.

== Personnel ==
- Suzanne Vega – vocals, composer
- Duncan Sheik – composer, Hammond B3, harmonium, pedal bass, percussion, background vocals
- Gerry Leonard – arranger, guitar, mandolin, producer, ukulele, vibraphone
- Roswell Rudd – trombone
- David Rothenberg – clarinet, bass clarinet
- Michael J. Merenda Jr. – banjo, banjo-ukulele
- Jason Hart – piano
- Will Holshouser – accordion
- Byron Isaacs – double bass
- Yuvall Lyon – drums
- Doug Yowell – percussion
- David Poe – background vocals
- Ruby Froom – background vocals
- The Garrison Gang – background vocals
- Kevin Killen – mixing
- Bob Ludwig – mastering
- Michael Tudor – engineer
- Milo Decruz – engineer

== Charts ==
Chart performance for Lover, Beloved: Songs from an Evening with Carson McCullers
Chart (2016)	Peak position
Belgian Albums (Ultratop Flanders)	33
Belgian Albums (Ultratop Wallonia)	58
Scottish Albums (Official Charts)	71
US Americana/Folk Albums (Billboard)	22
UK Americana Albums (Official Charts)	1
UK Independent Albums (Official Charts)	19
