= Tales from the Realm of the Queen of Pentacles =

Studio album by Suzanne Vega
- Released: February 18, 2014
- Studios: Clubhouse Studios (New York); Kyserike Station (New York); One East Studios (New York); Studio Disk Barrandov (Prague)
- Genres: Pop; rock; folk
- Length: 36:40
- Label: Amanuensis Productions
- Producer: Gerry Leonard

Suzanne Vega chronology
Close-Up Vol. 4, Songs of Family (2012)	Tales from the Realm of the Queen of Pentacles (2014)	Close-Up Series (2014)

Professional ratings
Aggregate scores
Source	Rating
Metacritic	76/100
Review scores
Source	Rating
AllMusic	3.5/5 stars
American Songwriter	4/5 stars
MusicOMH	4/5 stars

Tales from the Realm of the Queen of Pentacles is the eighth studio album by the American singer-songwriter Suzanne Vega.

Released in February 2014, it was Vega's first album of new material in seven years. The album features contributions from Larry Campbell and Tony Levin (bassist from King Crimson and Peter Gabriel). Although Vega's music had been sampled by various artists in the past, the album contains Vega's first own attempt at sampling with the track "Don't Uncork What You Can't Contain" which includes interpolations from 50 Cent's 2005 song "Candy Shop".

The album entered the UK Albums Chart at No. 37, the first time one of Vega's studio albums reached the UK Top 40 since 1992. It received generally favorable reviews.

The album appeared under Vega's own label, Amanuensis Productions, and was distributed by Cooking Vinyl.

In 2014 the album was awarded a silver certification from the Independent Music Companies Association, which indicated sales of at least 20,000 copies throughout Europe.

== Recording ==
Over the past number of years, Vega had collected "recordings with melodies, lyrics, notes and pieces of ideas" for songs on her iPhone. Together with long-time collaborator Gerry Leonard she began to 'solidify these ideas' over the course of a year. After road-testing a number of these songs on tour, the duo began the recording of the new material. Leonard gathered a number of musicians and began live-tracking at the Clubhouse Studios in upstate New York. Additional material was recorded at his home-studio, a converted railway station outside Rochester, New York. Leonard also oversaw the arrangement of the string section and the trumpet contribution made by Alison Balsom. "Song of the Stoic" was a follow-up to Vega's 1987 hit single "Luka", and was written from the point of view of the character as he looked back on his life.

== Track listing ==
All tracks are written by Suzanne Vega and Gerry Leonard except where noted

Tales from the Realm of the Queen of Pentacles track listing
No.	Title	Length
1.	"Crack in the Wall" (Vega)	4:23
2.	"Fool's Complaint" (Vega)	2:39
3.	"I Never Wear White"	3:08
4.	"Portrait of the Knight of Wands"	4:18
5.	"Don't Uncork What You Can't Contain"	3:31
6.	"Jacob and the Angel"	4:05
7.	"Silver Bridge"	3:47
8.	"Song of the Stoic"	4:05
9.	"Laying on of Hands/Stoic 2"	3:52
10.	"Horizon (There Is a Road)"	2:50
Total length:		36:40

== Personnel ==
- Suzanne Vega – vocals, guitar
- Gerry Leonard – acoustic and electric guitars, harmonium
- Larry Campbell – banjo, mandolin, cimbalom on tracks 1, 2, 8, 10
- Gail Ann Dorsey – bass on tracks 1, 2, 6 and 8
- Tony Levin – bass on tracks 3 and 5
- Mike Visceglia – bass on tracks 9 and 10
- Zachary Alford – drums and percussion on tracks 1, 2, 6 and 8
- Jay Bellerose – drums on track 3
- Sterling Campbell – drums on tracks 5 and 9
- Doug Yowell – drums on tracks 1, 4, 7, 9 and 10
- Joji Hirota – Taiko Drums and shakuhachi on tracks 5 and 6
- Alison Balsom – trumpet on track 10
- Catherine Russell – backing vocals on tracks 1, 2, 8, 9
- Smichov Chamber Orchestra, Prague (conducted by Josef Vondracek) – strings on tracks 5, 6, 8

Technical personnel

- Michael Tudor, assisted by Andy Gilchrist – engineering except; Strings recorded at Studio Disk Barrandov, Prague by Lukas Vacek and Karel Holas; Trumpet recorded at Angel Recording Studios, London by Gary Thomas; additional recording at Kyserike Station, N.Y. by Gerry Leonard
- Kevin Killen – mixing

== Charts ==
Chart performance for Tales from the Realm of the Queen of Pentacles
Chart (2014)	Peak position
Austrian Albums (Ö3 Austria)	66
Belgian Albums (Ultratop Flanders)	19
Belgian Albums (Ultratop Wallonia)	51
Dutch Albums (Album Top 100)	47
French Albums (SNEP)	124
German Albums (Offizielle Top 100)	38
Scottish Albums (Official Charts)	36
UK Albums (Official Charts)	37
UK Album Downloads (Official Charts)	80
UK Independent Albums (Official Charts)	9
US Billboard 200	173
US Americana/Folk Albums (Billboard)	5
US Independent Albums (Billboard)	36
US Top Rock Albums (Billboard)	48
