= Close-Up Vol. 3, States of Being =

Studio album by Suzanne Vega
- Released: July 11, 2011
- Genre: Acoustic
- Length: 44:09
- Label: Amanuensis Productions

Suzanne Vega chronology
| Close-Up Vol. 2, People & Places (2010) | Close-Up Vol. 3, States of Being (2011) | Close-Up Vol. 4, Songs of Family (2012) |

Professional ratings
Review scores
| Source | Rating |
|---|---|
| AllMusic | 3.5/5 stars |
| Sunday Express | 5/5 stars |

Close-Up Vol. 3, States of Being is the tenth studio album released by American singer-songwriter Suzanne Vega. The album consists of re-recordings of songs from Vega's back catalogue with stripped-down arrangements that highlight her lyrics and melodies. The songs included are her most haunting songs, which Suzanne used to call the "Mental Health" songs.

== Recording ==
"Language" was recorded in January 2011, but doesn't appear in the CD track listing. "Penitent" and "Undertow" were recorded in December 2010.

== Track listing ==
All tracks are written by Suzanne Vega, except where noted.

| No. | Title | Writer(s) | Original album | Length |
|---|---|---|---|---|
| 1. | "Undertow" | | Suzanne Vega (1985) | 3:31 |
| 2. | "When Heroes Go Down" | | 99.9F° (1992) | 2:06 |
| 3. | "My Favorite Plum" | | Nine Objects of Desire (1996) | 2:38 |
| 4. | "Solitude Standing" | Suzanne Vega, Michael Visceglia, Anton Sanko, Marc Shulman, Stephen Ferrera | Solitude Standing (1987) | 3:59 |
| 5. | "Cracking" | | Suzanne Vega (1985) | 2:58 |
| 6. | "Last Year's Troubles" | | Songs in Red and Gray (2001) | 3:08 |
| 7. | "Solitaire" | | Songs in Red and Gray (2001) | 2:15 |
| 8. | "Tombstone" | | Nine Objects of Desire (1996) | 2:47 |
| 9. | "Blood Makes Noise" | | 99.9F° (1992) | 3:05 |
| 10. | "50-50 Chance" | | Days of Open Hand (1990) | 2:48 |
| 11. | "Penitent" | | Songs in Red and Gray (2001) | 4:08 |
| 12. | "Straight Lines" | | Suzanne Vega (1985) | 4:03 |
| 13. | "Pornographer's Dream" | | Beauty & Crime (2007) | 3:31 |
| 14. | "Instant of the Hour After" | Vega, Duncan Sheik | Carson McCullers Talks About Love (2011) | 3:10 |
| Total length: | | | | 44:09 |

Amazon/Nimbit bonus tracks
| No. | Title | Writer(s) | Original album | Length |
|---|---|---|---|---|
| 15. | "Anniversary" | | Beauty & Crime (2007) | 3:05 |
| 16. | "Language" | Suzanne Vega, Michael Visceglia | Solitude Standing (1987) | 4:06 |
| Total length: | | | | 51:19 |
