= Left of Center (Suzanne Vega song) =

1986 single by Suzanne Vega

Single by Suzanne Vega featuring Joe Jackson

from the album Pretty in Pink (soundtrack)
- Released: May 30, 1986
- Length: 3:33
- Label: A&M
- Songwriters: Suzanne Vega; Steve Addabbo
- Producers: Steve Addabbo; Arthur Baker

Suzanne Vega singles chronology
"Marlene on the Wall" (1986)	"Left of Center" (1986)	"Gypsy" (1986)

Music video
- "Left of Centre" on YouTube

"Left of Center" is a song by American singer-songwriter Suzanne Vega, written by Vega and Steve Addabbo which was released as part of the soundtrack to the teen romantic comedy-drama film Pretty in Pink (1986). It features British musician Joe Jackson on piano and was released as a single in May 1986, reaching No. 35 in Australia, No. 28 in Ireland, and No. 32 in the United Kingdom.

"Left of Center" was A&M Records' first CD single, which was released on September 30, 1986. These copies included "Undertow" and "Cracking" as B-sides. A&M Records also issued a 7" and 10" editions of the single, with the latter being backed with live versions of "Left of Center" and "Freeze Tag".

== Critical reception ==
Reviewing the single, Cashbox wrote that "Vega puts her thoughtful, crafty writing to great effect here." Billboard characterized the single as an "extract of absorbing intensity." Writing for Music Week, Jerry Smith said that "this excellent track is sure to continue to turn Vega's reputation into much deserved major chart success."

== Charts ==
Chart (1986)	Peak position
Australia (Kent Music Report)	35
Europe (European Hot 100 Singles)	84
Ireland (IRMA)	28
Netherlands (Dutch Top 40 Tipparade)	7
UK Singles (Official Charts)	32
