= Voyetra-8 =

Eight voice polyphonic analog synthesizer

The Voyetra-8 (Voyetra-Eight) is an eight voice polyphonic analog synthesizer. Released in 1982 by Octave-Plateau Electronics (later renamed Voyetra and still later merged with Turtle Beach Systems to become Voyetra Turtle Beach, Inc.), it was one of the first analog programmable synthesizers to be rack-mountable and remains one of the most flexible digitally controlled analog synthesizers.

== Design ==
The Voyetra-8 is a 19" rack-mountable device, 3 rack units high at the face. Most units are bowed at the top and so cannot be placed below other rack mounted equipment more than a few inches deep. It is approximately 16 inches deep in the rack, and weighs around 38 lbs. Rear mounted plugs and a large heat sink make at least 4" rear clearance advisable.

The front panel has numerous buttons and knobs, which are active in live performance. However, the instrument is more complicated than it looks; there are fourteen "pages" of controls. Extra "pages" are accessed by hitting certain shift key combinations, after which most of the front-panel controls change function. These pages are used when setting up the instrument and programming sounds.

The rear panel has a mono output and a stereo output. When connected in stereo, one four-voice sound appears at each output if the instrument is in Dual or Layer mode, or the eight voices are each panned in different places between the outputs if the instrument is in Whole-8 mode.

The memory, which stores all of the user presets and parameters, can be dumped via MIDI to any sequencer. The dump is not MIDI System Exclusive (SysEx); it is encoded into controller changes and other common MIDI data, which any sequencer can handle. This may seem somewhat unusual, but in the day of the Voyetra, MIDI was in its infancy, and SysEx was not yet a proven strategy for transmitting and storing system information.

== Architecture ==
The Voyetra-8 has 8 separate programmable analog voice cards. Each produces one voice of the maximum 8. It can store 100 "Programs", and can play either one 8-voice sound in Whole-8 mode, a different 4-voice sound on each half of the keyboard (or on different MIDI channels) in Split mode, or two 4-voice sounds per note (which could both be the same) in Layer mode.

The keyboard mode, key assignment mode, two selected sounds, and a number of parameter trims and tweaks (such as octave shift on either Voice, detune, and cutoff frequency offset) are stored as a "Step". The instrument can store 100 Steps. Generally, a performer will call up Steps, not Voices, during live performance; each Step will call up two of the Voices and tweak them for the song to be played.

Each voice has two VCOs, one VCA, one 24 dB/octave lowpass VCF, two LFOs, two ADSRs, noise generator, sync VCO 1 to VCO 2.

The specs belie the complexity of the sound architecture, because of the great deal of control the programmer (and the player) has over various aspects of sound production, including key assignment modes, modulation routing, and envelope parameters.

=== Key assignment modes and envelope parameters ===
Any polyphonic instrument must use an algorithm to assign available voices to played notes (unless the instrument has enough voices to cover all of the notes). If a player is holding down 8 notes and hits another, does it sound? If so, does it rob the oldest note played or one of the others? If notes are not being held down but still decaying, will they be robbed? If a note is played repeatedly, does the same voice sound again or does another voice trigger, layered on top of the first? Many of the answers to these questions can be set by the programmer using the key assignment modes and envelope parameters.

In Whole-8 mode, the Voyetra-8 has 8 voices. In Split mode, it has two sets of four. In Layer mode, it has four.

Key assignment modes are stored with the Step, not the Voice. The following are the possible key assignment modes:

- Round robin - each note played, or a note replayed, triggers the next voice in numerical sequence.
- Round robin with retrigger - each new note played triggers the next voice; a note replayed retriggers the same voice it last used (unless it has since been reused by another note).
- Reset - first note played alone triggers voice 1, if second is added voice 2 is used, and so on.
- Reset with retrigger - same as Reset, except that a note replayed retriggers the same voice it last used (unless it has since been reused by another note).

Extra envelope parameters (besides the Attack time, Decay time, Sustain level, and Release time) also control the way the sound responds to the keyboard.

- Release defeat - if enabled, regardless of the release time, stops the sound when the key is lifted. In combination with a footswitch that momentarily turns release defeat "Off" when pressed, this can be used to provide a Sustain Pedal (sostenuto) effect. (Stored with the Step)
- Release gets decay - if enabled, and release defeat is On, when the key is lifted, it releases according to the Decay time instead of the Release time. (Stored with the Voice, separate setting for each ADSR)
- ADR - if enabled, eliminates the Sustain portion of the envelope, so once the Decay reaches the Sustain level, Release begins immediately. (Stored with the Voice, separate setting for each ADSR)
- Unconditional Retrigger (a.k.a. Reset to Zero) - if enabled, when a voice is retriggered, the ADSR attacks from 0 instead of attacking from where it was. For instance, the sound might have been still audible when the key was lifted and repressed. With Unconditional Retrigger, on the repress the new sound on that voice will start from zero. In combination with one of the "retrigger" key assignment modes, or perhaps the "reset" mode, this will have the effect of clearly articulating the start of the retriggered note. (Stored with the Voice, separate setting for each ADSR)

=== Modulation banks ===
The instrument contains a sophisticated matrix for the handling and routing of control voltages. There are four modulation "banks" per Voice. Each modulation bank is independent of the others; within each a modulation source and one or more destinations is chosen, and a controller is selected if it is desired to alter the amount of modulation during live performance.

For instance, on modulation bank A, one might choose LFO1 one as the source, VCO1 and VCO2 pitch as the destination, and channel aftertouch (pressure) as the controller. This could add vibrato to the notes when aftertouch pressure was applied to the keyboard. In bank B, one might then choose DC as the source, VCO2 pitch as the destination, and velocity as the controller. This could be used to detune VCO2 slightly relative to VCO1 when a note is struck hard.

==== Modulation sources ====
- LFO1 sine
- LFO1 square
- LFO2
- VCO1
- VCO2
- ADSR1
- ADSR2
- DC (direct current, for producing an offset)

==== Modulation controllers ====
- Velocity
- Channel aftertouch (pressure)
- Joystick +X
- Joystick -X
- Keyboard tracking
- ADSR1 (Banks A, B only)
- Noise (Bank C only)
- Pedal (Bank D only)

Joystick +X and Joystick -X each can be assigned its own MIDI Continuous Controller number. Also, a global parameter setting on the Voy will invert the sense of the Joystick for the left Voice in all Steps that use Split Mode so that the left Voice gets the -X as a positive value. When this is done, the -X controller can be used to positively control modulation on the left Voice, while the +X controller can be used to positively control modulation of the right voice.

==== Modulation destinations ====
Any combination of destinations can be selected per bank.

- filter cutoff
- filter Q
- VCO 1
- VCO 2

== Specs ==
- Polyphony - 8 voice
- Oscillators - 2 VCOs per voice (saw, sine, sqr, pw)
- LFO - 2 LFOs
- Filter - 24 dB/oct low pass resonant filter with ADSR
- VCA - 2 ADSR envelope generators
- Memory - 100 patches (Programs), 100 Steps

== Controllers ==
The Voyetra VPK-5 keyboard, if used, is connected to the head using an XLR mic cable. This XLR cable, while compatible with those used by the Voyetra-8's MIDI, does not carry MIDI data. The Voyetra is fully controllable from a MIDI controller or sequencer. The VPK-5 keyboard has a joystick to the left of the keys where the pitch and mod wheels would commonly be found on other synthesizers.

== Idiosyncrasies ==
- the "hot" chassis (this makes independent grounding and isolation from the rack and other electronic hardware important)
- the fact that the instrument powers up in MIDI OMNI mode (per MIDI spec)
- the XLR connectors for MIDI

== Trivia ==
In New Order's promotional music video for their 1985 single "The Perfect Kiss", the Voyetra-8 appears in the first scenes of the clip used by band member Gillian Gilbert. New Order used to tour with a rack containing four Voyetra-8s, although two were spares as early units tended to break down regularly.

Gary Pozner, keyboard player for Tom Tom Club, also used the Voyetra-8, as his main synthesizer. The Voyetra-8 was so versatile it could emulate most of the synthesizer keyboard parts played by Bernie Worrell on some of the early records. The specific history of Pozner's rig resurfaced years later in the vintage synthesizer community. Besides the Voyetra 8, Pozner live rig consisted of 2 Akai S900 samplers, a Yamaha DX7, and a Roland D50.
