= Days of Open Hand =

Studio album by Suzanne Vega
- Released: April 10, 1990
- Recorded: September 1989 – January 1990
- Studios: Skyline (New York City); RPM (New York City); The Living Room (New York City)
- Genres: Folk rock; pop
- Length: 45:51
- Label: A&M
- Producers: Anton Sanko; Suzanne Vega

Suzanne Vega chronology
Solitude Standing (1987)	Days of Open Hand (1990)	99.9F° (1992)

Singles from Days of Open Hand
- 1. "Book of Dreams" Released: 1990; 2. "Tired of Sleeping" Released: 1990; 3. "Men in a War" Released: 1990

Days of Open Hand is the third studio album by American singer-songwriter Suzanne Vega. It was released on April 10, 1990, through A&M Records. The album was the follow-up to the successful Solitude Standing (1987). It was produced by Vega and Anton Sanko, who also co-wrote six of the album's eleven tracks. Recording took place across multiple studios throughout New York City from late 1989 to early 1990.

Days of Open Hand combines Vega's established folk rock style with more varied instrumentation such as the ney and dumbec and experimental arrangements. High-profile contributors to the album include Philip Glass, Shawn Colvin, and John Linnell of They Might Be Giants. The album saw greater use of synthesizers and samplers than Vega's previous studio albums; these included the digital Fairlight CMI and analog Voyetra-8.

Days of Open Hand did not match the success of its predecessor, stalling at number 50 on the U.S. Billboard 200 and failing to spawn a hit single. It was more successful on the UK Albums Chart, where it reached the top 10. Despite this, the album did surpass sales of a million copies and reviews were generally positive. Days of Open Hand was nominated for Best Contemporary Folk Recording and won the award for Best Recording Package at the 33rd Annual Grammy Awards.

== Background ==
Vega's previous studio album Solitude Standing was a major success worldwide, spawning the top 5 hit song "Luka" and placing within the top 10 of the album charts in twelve countries (alongside a number 11 peak in the U.S.). The album also contained "Tom's Diner" which would achieve further success after being remixed by English electronic music producers DNA in 1990.

With the followup studio album, Vega went in a more experimental direction, featuring elements of various genres and many high-profile collaborators. Songs such as "Institution Green" and "Fifty-Fifty Chance" place heavy emphasis on atmosphere; the latter features string arrangements done by Philip Glass. Six of the album's eleven songs feature music written by Sanko while all lyrics were written solely by Vega.

== Commercial performance ==
Days of Open Hand did not achieve the sales of its predecessor upon release, but was still successful in many territories. While the album stalled at number 50 in the U.S., it was a top 10 hit in the UK, peaking at number 7. Additionally, it reached the top 20 in five other countries throughout Europe. "Book of Dreams", the album's first single, peaked at number 66 on the UK singles chart and number 8 on the U.S. Modern Rock Tracks chart. However, the album's second and third singles, "Tired of Sleeping" and "Men in a War" failed to see any chart success.

== Critical reception ==
Professional ratings
Review scores
Source	Rating
AllMusic	3.5/5 stars
Robert Christgau	B−
Entertainment Weekly	B−
NME	7/10
Q	3/5 stars
Record Mirror	3/5 stars
Rolling Stone	4/5 stars
Vancouver Sun	4/5 stars
The Windsor Star	B+

Days of Open Hand received generally positive reviews from critics. In a review for Rolling Stone, Paul Evans awarded the album four out of five stars, stating it consists of "her hardest and loveliest music yet". He went on to refer to the trio of "Men in a War", "Institution Green" and "Fifty-Fity Chance" as a "suite of songs astonishing for their cleareyed gaze at pain", comparing Vega to poets Emily Dickinson, Sylvia Plath and Stevie Smith. In a retrospective review for AllMusic, Alex Henderson commended the album's "subtlety", praising her vocals for being "expressive" without "need[ing] to shout or preach to get her points across".

== Track listing ==
All lyrics are written by Suzanne Vega.

No.	Title	Music	Length
1.	"Tired of Sleeping"	Vega	4:22
2.	"Men in a War"	Vega	4:47
3.	"Rusted Pipe"	Anton Sanko	4:16
4.	"Book of Dreams"	Sanko	3:22
5.	"Institution Green"	Sanko	6:15
6.	"Those Whole Girls (Run in Grace)"	Vega	3:09
7.	"Room off the Street"	Sanko	3:00
8.	"Big Space"	Sanko	3:46
9.	"Predictions"	Vega	4:59
10.	"Fifty-Fifty Chance"	Vega	2:36
11.	"Pilgrimage"	Sanko	5:10
Total length:			45:51

== Personnel ==
- Suzanne Vega – vocals, acoustic guitar (1, 2, 4, 6, 9) backing vocals (1, 2, 4, 7, 11), Fairlight CMI synthesizer (3, 8)
- Anton Sanko – guitar, Hammond C3 organ, tiple, Prophet VS, DX711, Voyetra-8, Fairlight CMI synthesizers, Akai S1000 sampler, programming, string arrangement (5)
- Shawn Colvin – backing vocals (2–4)
- Marc Shulman – EBow (5, 9), electric guitar (1–5, 9, 11), tiple (1, 6, 8, 11), 12-string electric guitar (4), bouzouki (8)
- Michael Visceglia – five-string bass (1–4, 6), fretless bass (5, 9, 11)
- Erik Sanko – fretless bass (7)
- Percy Jones – fretless bass (9)
- John Linnell – accordion (1)
- Richard Horowitz – ney (7)
- Hearn Gadbois – dumbec
- Michael Blair – marimba (3), metal percussion (2, 3), tambourine (2, 3) percussion (5), shaker (7, 11), hand drum (11)
- Glen Velez – drums
- Frank Vilardi – drums (1–5, 11), percussion (1–5, 11), rims and brushes (5), Akai S1000 sampler (6), percussion (8), shaker (8), snare and tom tom drums (9), blastics (11)
- Philip Glass – string arrangement (10)
- Maria Kitsopoulos – cello (5)
- Fred Zlotkin – cello (10)
- Sandra Park – first violin (5)
- Barry Finclair – violin solo (10)
- Hae Young Ham – violin (5)
- Timothy Baker – violin (10)
- Rebecca Young – viola (5)
- Alfred Brown – viola (10)

Production

- Bob Ludwig – mastering
- Hugh Padgham – mixing
- Pat McCarthy – engineer
- Pat Dillett – assistant engineer
- Geoff Keehn – engineer
- Jeff Lippay – assistant engineer
- Jon Goldberger – assistant engineer
- Kurt Munkasci – string engineer

== Charts ==
Weekly chart performance for Days of Open Hand
Chart (1990)	Peak position
Australian Albums (ARIA)	74
Austrian Albums (Ö3 Austria)	9
Canada Top Albums/CDs (RPM)	33
Dutch Albums (Album Top 100)	29
Finnish Albums (The Official Finnish Charts)	2
German Albums (Offizielle Top 100)	16
Hungarian Albums (MAHASZ)	32
New Zealand Albums (RMNZ)	24
Norwegian Albums (VG-lista)	16
Swedish Albums (Sverigetopplistan)	19
Swiss Albums (Schweizer Hitparade)	19
UK Albums (Official Charts)	7
US Billboard 200	50

Year-end chart performance for Days of Open Hand
Chart (1990)	Position
European Albums (Music & Media)	87

== Certifications ==
Region	Certification	Certified units/sales
United Kingdom (BPI)	Gold	100,000^{^}
Summaries
Worldwide	—	1,000,000
^{^} Shipments figures based on certification alone.

=== Singles ===
Year	Single	Chart	Peak position
1990	"Book of Dreams"	Billboard Modern Rock Tracks	8
1990	"Book of Dreams"	Canada	30
1990	"Book of Dreams"	UK singles chart	66
