= Tom's Diner =

1987 single by Suzanne Vega

Single by Suzanne Vega

from the album Solitude Standing
- B-side: "Left of Center"; "Luka" (live)
- Written: 1981 or 1982
- Released: 1987
- Studio: Bearsville (Woodstock, New York); RPM Sound (Calgary, Alberta)
- Genre: A cappella
- Length: 2:09
- Label: A&M
- Songwriter: Suzanne Vega
- Producers: Steve Addabbo; Lenny Kaye

Suzanne Vega singles chronology
"Luka" (1987)	"Tom's Diner" (1987)	"Solitude Standing" (1988)

Music video
- "Tom's Diner" (Acapella Version) on YouTube

"Tom's Diner" is a song by American singer-songwriter Suzanne Vega. Written in 1981 or 1982, it was first included as a track on the January 1984 issue of Fast Folk Musical Magazine. Originally featured on her second studio album, Solitude Standing (1987), it was released as a single in Europe only in 1987 following the success of her single "Luka". It was later used as the basis for a remix by the English electronic music producers DNA in 1990, which reached No. 1 in Austria, Germany, Greece, Luxembourg and Switzerland.

The song is also known for its use in testing various digital compression schemes during the development of the MP3, earning Vega the title of "Mother of the MP3".

== Original version ==
=== Background and writing ===
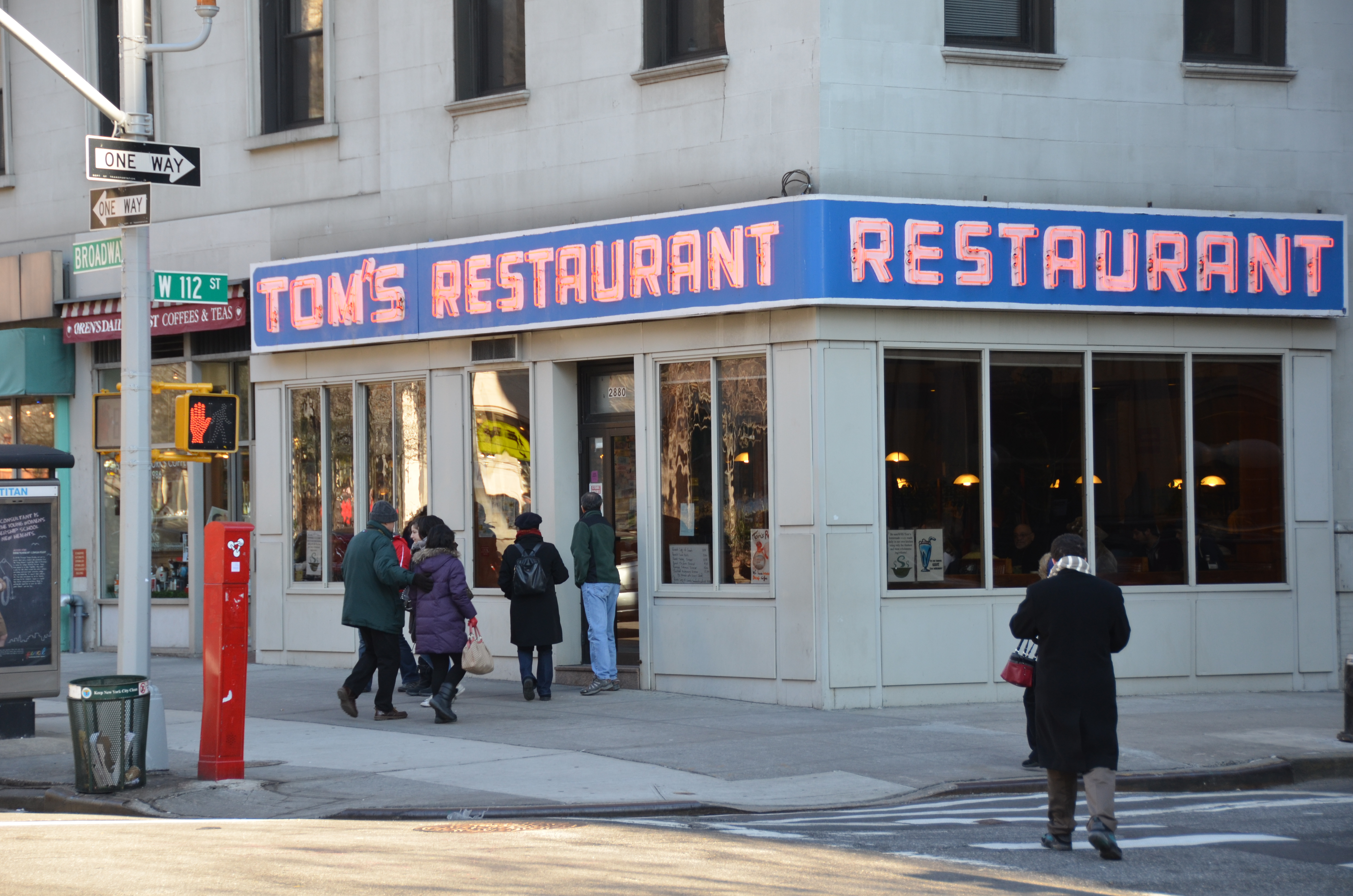
The real Tom's Restaurant in Manhattan, New York City

The "Tom's Diner" of the song is Tom's Restaurant in Manhattan, New York City, a mid-20th-century diner on the northeast corner of Broadway and West 112th Street. Singer-songwriter Suzanne Vega was reputedly a frequent patron during the early 1980s when she was a student at nearby Barnard College. The diner later became famous as the location used for the exterior scenes of Monk's Café in the popular 1990s television sitcom Seinfeld.

The song begins with the narrator stopping at a diner for a cup of coffee. The song mentions reading a newspaper as well as seeing two women, one who enters the diner and one who stands outside in the rain. The ringing of bells at a nearby cathedral (St. John the Divine) causes the narrator to reminisce about an unnamed companion and a midnight picnic. At the end of the song, the narrator leaves the diner to catch the train after the coffee is finished.

Vega wrote the song based on a comment by her friend Brian Rose, a photographer, who mentioned that in his work, he sometimes felt as if "he saw his whole life through a pane of glass, and [...] like he was the witness to a lot of things, but was never really involved in them". She attempted to think and write in this fashion (including a male perspective) while sitting at Tom's Restaurant.

=== "Tom's Diner Day": The date of the composition ===
An article on Suzanne Vega's official website uses clues in the song to determine the exact date that Vega wrote it.

Vega said that she wrote the song in 1982; Brian Rose has said that it was written sometime between mid-1981 and mid-1982. The lyrics refer to a rainy morning, when she was at the diner on the corner, reading in her newspaper of "a story of an actor / who had died while he was drinking", and afterwards "turning to the horoscope / and looking for the funnies". Only two newspapers in New York City carried comic strips, or "funnies", in 1981 and 1982, and only one, the New York Post, featured a front-page story of the death of actor and one of the biggest box-office draws of the 1950s William Holden, whose body was discovered on Monday, November 16, 1981. In a 2008 essay for The New York Times, Vega confirmed that Holden was the actor whose death she had read about and inspired the line in the song.

=== Music and lyrics ===
Vega conceived "Tom's Diner" as a piece for voice and solo piano. Two versions feature on her album Solitude Standing; the album opens with an a cappella version, and closes with an instrumental version played on keyboards, with guitars lending support.

=== The "Mother of the MP3" ===
"Tom's Diner" was used by the German electrical engineer and mathematician Karlheinz Brandenburg as a reference in developing the MP3 audio compression scheme. He recalled: "I was ready to fine-tune my compression algorithm...somewhere down the corridor, a radio was playing 'Tom's Diner.' I was electrified. I knew it would be nearly impossible to compress this warm a cappella voice."

In a 2009 documentary about the history of the song by Swedish SVT, Brandenburg said: "I was finishing my PhD thesis, and then I was reading some hi-fi magazine and found that they had used this song to test loudspeakers. I said 'OK, let's test what this song does to my sound system, to MP3'. And the result was, at bit rates where everything else sounded quite nice, Suzanne Vega's voice sounded horrible."

Brandenburg adopted the song for testing purposes, listening to it again and again each time he refined the scheme, making sure it did not adversely affect the subtlety of Vega's voice. While the MP3 compression format is not specifically tuned to play the song "Tom's Diner" (an assortment of critically analyzed material was involved in the design of the codec over many years), among audio engineers this anecdote has earned Vega the informal title "The Mother of the MP3".

=== Track listings ===
- 12-inch maxi
1. "Tom's Diner"
2. "Left of Center"
3. "Tom's Diner" (live)
4. "Luka" (live)

=== Charts ===
1987 weekly chart performance for "Tom's Diner"
Chart (1987)	Peak position
Ireland (IRMA)	26
UK Singles (Official Charts)	58

2009 weekly chart performance for "Tom's Diner"
Chart (2009)	Peak position
Denmark (Tracklisten)	24

2010 weekly chart performance for "Tom's Diner"
Chart (2010)	Peak position
Sweden (Sverigetopplistan)	56

== DNA remix ==
"Tom's Diner (DNA Remix)"
- Artwork for European releases

Single by DNA featuring Suzanne Vega
- Released: July 16, 1990
- Genre: Trip hop
- Length: 3:47
- Label: A&M
- Songwriter: Suzanne Vega
- Producers: Steve Addabbo; Lenny Kaye; DNA

DNA featuring Suzanne Vega singles chronology
"Tom's Diner (DNA Remix)" (1990)	"Rusted Pipe" (1991)

Suzanne Vega singles chronology
"Men in a War" (1990)	"Tom's Diner" (1990)	"In Liverpool" (1992)

Audio sample
- file; help

Music video
- "Tom's Diner" on YouTube

=== Background ===
"Three years later, I heard that two young English guys called DNA had put a beat to it – and I cringed. I'd just had a big hit with "Luka", which – unfortunately, despite its dark subject matter, child abuse – lent itself to all sorts of parodies and covers, most of which I hated. I feared more of the same, but to my great relief I loved what DNA had done. I thought it would be played in a few dance clubs and that would be it, but it surpassed everyone's expectations. I even got a plaque for it being one of the most played R&B songs – funny for a folk singer."

— Suzanne Vega talking about the song.

In 1990, two English record producers under the name DNA remixed "Tom's Diner", grafting Vega's vocals onto a dance beat from British musical collective Soul II Soul ("Keep On Movin'") and turning her simple ad-libbed outro – "Do do do uh, do da-do uh" – into the song's driving hook. At the time, it was impossible to get a whole song into a sampler, so they spent evenings and weekends cutting Vega's vocals into little bits. Without permission from Vega, her record label, or publisher, the duo released the remix on a limited basis for distribution to clubs as "Oh Suzanne" by "DNA featuring Suzanne Vega". Vega's record company of the time, A&M, arranged to release the remix rather than take DNA to court for copyright infringement.

A&M struck the deal after consulting with Vega, who liked the interpretation. Vega told a British columnist, "(A&M) asked me what I thought of it and I told them it was really kind of nice. So I said, 'Go ahead and release it.' I wasn't expecting it to be successful—I never thought it would be that popular. It just seemed very charming." The remix became a much larger hit than Vega had with the song originally, peaking at number two on the UK singles chart and number five on the US Billboard Hot 100, and it became one of a handful of tracks to chart in the top 10 of both the Modern Rock Tracks (number seven) and Billboard Hot R&B Singles (number 10) charts. The remix also reached number one in Austria, Germany, Greece, Luxembourg and Switzerland.

=== Composition ===
The remix of the song is written in the key of F♯ minor in common time with a tempo of 99 beats per minute. Vega's vocals span from F♯_{3} to E_{4} in the song.

=== Critical reception ===
Larry Flick from Billboard magazine commented, "Don't miss the exceptional 'Tom's Diner', by DNA featuring Suzanne Vega." He noted that the English outfit had placed "a slammin' Soul II Soul-flavored swing instrumental" underneath Vega's song, and also described the track as "indelibly infectious." Student newspaper Columbia Daily Spectator named it a "surprise hit". Marisa Fox from Entertainment Weekly complimented its dance beat as "mesmerizing". Patrick Goldstein from Los Angeles Times said, "Strange but true-almost." He added that the "waif-like pop songstress" has suddenly become the "queen of London's trendy club scene, thanks to her sinewy, Soul II Soul-style dance hit". Everett True from Melody Maker commented, "This is so f***ing smooth. You know the original, I'm sure: Suzanne's unaccompanied tale of everyday morning life in the big city in the wake of a break-up, incisively, poignantly observed. Magical. Now imagine it set to an unobtrusive, mellow backbeat which slips down even easier. F***ing superb! What is it about today? Single of the week. No shit."

A reviewer of Music & Media found that "the lonely vocal part is perfectly complemented by the Steely Dan type horns and the grinding hip-hop beat. A fine version." Music Week ranked the song number-one in their Top 10 list, "Pick of the Year – Dance". Diane Tameecha from The Network Forty felt the connection of Vega's "sensuously soft voice and the unlikely rhythm (for her music, anyway) is startlingly vibrant, and its jazziness is an instant ear-catcher." Mandi James from NME named it Single of the Week, writing, "A strange record, if only for the fact Suzanne Vega has previously failed to move me in any way, except to get up and leave the room. Dropped against a sensual, tactile beat those irritatingly vacant girly vocals are miraculously transformed into a hypnotic, bitter sweet ballad. The crushing folking bore has been given a new lease of life and should be eternally grateful to plastic surgeons DNA. The nearest thing to perfection I've heard all week." Smash Hits's reviewer said remixes like this one "end up sounding far better than the originals and the result is rather refreshing." Alec Foege from Spin remarked that "Tom's Diner" was an international hit "only after DNA did a dance remix".

=== Impact and legacy ===
In 2004, Q magazine featured the DNA remix of the song in their list of "The 1010 Songs You Must Own".

=== Music video ===
A music video was produced to promote the song, directed by Gareth Roberts. It does not feature Vega.

=== Track listings ===
- CD maxi
1. "Tom's Diner" (7-inch A) – 3:47
2. "Tom's Diner" by Suzanne Vega – 2:39
3. "Tom's Diner" (a cappella) by Suzanne Vega – 2:08
4. "Tom's Diner" (12-inch A) – 5:20
- 7-inch single
1. "Tom's Diner" – 3:47
2. "Tom's Diner" (a cappella) by Suzanne Vega – 2:08
- 12-inch maxi
1. "Tom's Diner" (remix) – 6:03 (this version, containing piano with a solo part, has not yet been released digitally or on CD)
2. "Tom's Diner" by Suzanne Vega
3. "Tom's Diner" (a cappella) by Suzanne Vega
- Cassette single
1. "Tom's Diner" 7-inch version by Suzanne Vega (side 1)
2. "Tom's Diner" 12-inch version by Suzanne Vega (side 2)

=== Charts ===
==== Weekly charts ====
Weekly chart performance for the DNA remix of "Tom's Diner"
Chart (1990–1991)	Peak position
Australia (ARIA)	8
Austria (Ö3 Austria Top 40)	1
Belgium (Ultratop 50 Flanders)	3
Canada Top Singles (RPM)	13
Canada Dance/Urban (RPM)	4
Europe (Eurochart Hot 100)	2
European Airplay (Music & Media)	1
Finland (Suomen virallinen lista)	14
France (SNEP)	16
Germany (GfK)	1
Greece (IFPI)	1
Ireland (IRMA)	2
Israel (Israeli Singles Chart)	2
Italy (Musica e dischi)	9
Luxembourg (Radio Luxembourg)	1
Netherlands (Dutch Top 40)	2
Netherlands (Single Top 100)	4
New Zealand (Recorded Music NZ)	8
Portugal (AFP)	7
Spain (AFYVE)	9
Switzerland (Schweizer Hitparade)	1
UK Singles (Official Charts)	2
UK Dance (Music Week)	1
US Billboard Hot 100	5
US Alternative Airplay (Billboard)	7
US Dance Club Songs (Billboard)	13
US Dance Singles Sales (Billboard)	5
US Hot R&B/Hip-Hop Songs (Billboard)	10
US Cash Box Top 100	4

==== Year-end charts ====
1990 year-end chart performance for the DNA remix of "Tom's Diner"
Chart (1990)	Position
Australia (ARIA)	89
Austria (Ö3 Austria Top 40)	17
Belgium (Ultratop)	45
Canada Dance/Urban (RPM)	15
Europe (Eurochart Hot 100)	16
Germany (Media Control)	6
Israel (Israeli Singles Chart)	30
Netherlands (Dutch Top 40)	32
Netherlands (Single Top 100)	39
Switzerland (Schweizer Hitparade)	23
UK Singles (OCC)	32
UK Club Chart (Record Mirror)	19

1991 year-end chart performance for the DNA remix of "Tom's Diner"
Chart (1991)	Position
Italy (Musica e dischi)	79
US Billboard Hot 100	53
US 12-inch Singles Sales (Billboard)	45

=== Certifications ===
Certifications and sales for the DNA remix of "Tom's Diner"
Region	Certification	Certified units/sales
Germany (BVMI)	Gold	400,000
United Kingdom (BPI)	Silver	200,000^{^}
United States (RIAA)	Gold	500,000^{^}
^{^} Shipments figures based on certification alone.

=== Release history ===
Release dates and formats for the DNA remix of "Tom's Diner"
Region	Date	Format(s)	Label(s)	Ref.
United Kingdom	July 16, 1990	—N/a	A&M	
Australia	September 24, 1990	7-inch vinyl; 12-inch; cassette	A&M	
Japan	October 21, 1990	Mini CD	A&M	

== Giorgio Moroder version ==
"Tom's Diner"

Single by Giorgio Moroder featuring Britney Spears

from the album Déjà Vu
- Released: October 9, 2015
- Recorded: 2014
- Genre: Disco; pop; EDM
- Length: 3:32
- Label: RCA
- Songwriter: Suzanne Vega
- Producers: Raney Shockne; Jeeve; Patrick Jordan-Patrikios; Emily Wright

Giorgio Moroder singles chronology
"Déjà Vu" (2015)	"Tom's Diner" (2015)	"Good for Me" (2016)

Britney Spears singles chronology
"Pretty Girls" (2015)	"Tom's Diner" (2015)	"Make Me" (2016)

Lyric video
- "Tom's Diner" on YouTube

For the release of his fourteenth studio album Déjà Vu on June 12, 2015, Italian composer and record producer Giorgio Moroder included a cover version of the song, featuring American pop singer Britney Spears on his album as the eighth track. It was later released as the album's fourth and final single on October 9, 2015, with two new remixes included, marking the second release from Spears in 2015, following "Pretty Girls" with Australian rapper Iggy Azalea, and additionally her first featured appearance since "S&M (Remix)" in 2011.

Despite being a non-single track at that time, it became Moroder's best-selling digital song to date, debuting and peaking at number 38 on the Billboard Dance/Electronic Songs chart, and number fourteen on the Billboard Dance/Electronic Digital Songs chart, during the week of July 4, 2015.

=== Track listing ===
1. "Tom's Diner" – 3:32
2. "Tom's Diner" (Leu Leu Land Remix) – 2:58
3. "Tom's Diner" (Hibell Remix) – 3:17

=== Charts ===
==== Weekly charts ====
Weekly chart performance of "Tom's Diner" by Giorgio Moroder featuring Britney Spears
Chart (2015–2018)	Peak position
CIS Airplay (TopHit)	94
France (SNEP)	146
Lebanon (Lebanese Top 20)	11
Ukraine Airplay (TopHit)	26
US Hot Dance/Electronic Songs (Billboard)	38
US Dance/Electronic Streaming Songs (Billboard)	14

==== Year-end charts ====
Year-end chart performance of "Tom's Diner" by Giorgio Moroder featuring Britney Spears
Chart (2018)	Position
Ukraine Airplay (TopHit)	149

=== Release history ===
Release dates for "Tom's Diner" by Giorgio Moroder featuring Britney Spears
Region	Date	Format	Label	Ref.
Various	October 9, 2015	Digital download	Giorgio Moroder Music LLC; RCA	
Italy	October 16, 2015	Contemporary hit radio	Giorgio Moroder Music LLC; Sony	

== AnnenMayKantereit and Giant Rooks version ==
"Tom's Diner"

Single by AnnenMayKantereit and Giant Rooks
- Released: June 28, 2019
- Recorded: 2019
- Genre: Blues rock
- Length: 4:29
- Label: UMG
- Songwriter: Suzanne Vega
- Producer: Fabian Langer

Lyric video
- "Tom's Diner" on YouTube

The German rock bands AnnenMayKantereit and Giant Rooks covered the song in 2019. The cover went viral on TikTok in March 2022, reaching more than 120 million views on TikTok and 330 million streams on Spotify as of November 2024.

=== Charts ===
==== Weekly charts ====
Weekly chart performance for "Tom's Diner" by AnnenMayKantereit and Giant Rooks
Chart (2022)	Peak position
Australia (ARIA)	18
Austria (Ö3 Austria Top 40)	45
Canada Hot 100 (Billboard)	38
Germany (GfK)	76
Global 200 (Billboard)	66
Ireland (IRMA)	33
Lithuania (AGATA)	18
Netherlands (Single Tip)	19
New Zealand (Recorded Music NZ)	16
Sweden Heatseeker (Sverigetopplistan)	7
Switzerland (Schweizer Hitparade)	86
UK Singles (Official Charts)	63
US Billboard Hot 100	78
US Hot Rock & Alternative Songs (Billboard)	8

==== Year-end charts ====
Year-end chart performance for "Tom's Diner" by AnnenMayKantereit and Giant Rooks
Chart (2022)	Position
US Hot Rock & Alternative Songs (Billboard)	27

=== Certifications ===
Certifications for "Tom's Diner" by AnnenMayKantereit and Giant Rooks
Region	Certification	Certified units/sales
Austria (IFPI Austria)	Platinum	30,000^{‡}
Brazil (Pro-Música Brasil)	Gold	20,000^{‡}
Canada (Music Canada)	Platinum	80,000^{‡}
Germany (BVMI)	Gold	200,000^{‡}
New Zealand (RMNZ)	Platinum	30,000^{‡}
Poland (ZPAV)	Gold	25,000^{‡}
United Kingdom (BPI)	Silver	200,000^{‡}
United States (RIAA)	Gold	500,000^{‡}
^{‡} Sales+streaming figures based on certification alone.

== Remakes and samples ==
=== Remakes ===
The song spawned a number of hip-hop, dance, and rock remixes and remakes from artists such as Peter Behrens (drummer from Trio) and Bingo Hand Job, a whimsical one-time collaboration between Billy Bragg and R.E.M.. It was also sampled in songs by Public Enemy, Nikki D, Tupac Shakur, Twin Hype, Yo Gotti and Lil' Kim, among other hip-hop acts.

In 1991, Vega, noting the huge number of remakes of the song, released Tom's Album, a compilation of different versions of the song, spanning a variety of musical genres, including a parody by Richard Cheese that worked in references to fantasy sitcom television series I Dream of Jeannie called "Jeannie's Diner", which Nick at Nite would use to promote its airings of the show. The album also featured another DNA remix of one of Vega's songs, "Rusted Pipe", originally on her third studio album Days of Open Hand (1990). On the album's sleeve, Vega wrote: "A small song about eating breakfast became a song about accidental pregnancy (Daddy's Little Girl – Nikki D.) and the recent war in the Gulf (Waiting at the Border). One version incorporates forgotten bits of pop culture (Jeannie's Diner). All of them surprised me; a couple made me wince. I include them anyway." The album also includes the parody by Bingo Hand Job, recorded at a live performance in 1991. This version was not included on the live album of this concert because the band members felt it "didn't meet the lowly standards of Bingo Hand Job."

In 2015, sound artist and composer Ryan Maguire released the track "moDernisT" (an anagram of "Tom's Diner") as a part of his project "The Ghost in the MP3". "moDernisT" is composed exclusively of the sounds deleted during MP3 compression from the song "Tom's Diner", known as the mother of the MP3. A detailed account of the techniques used to isolate the sounds deleted during MP3 compression, along with the conceptual motivation for the project, was published in the 2014 Proceedings of the International Computer Music Conference.

In 2020, English producer Robbie Doherty remixed the song with artist Keees, titling it "Pour the Milk", launching it to No. 44 on the UK singles chart.

As of 2023, there are over 50 versions of "Tom's Diner".

=== Samples and interpolations ===
In 2014, American rock band Fall Out Boy used an interpolation of "Tom's Diner" in their song "Centuries".

In 2024, American rapper Cupcakke interpolated the song in her track "Dora" on her fifth studio album Dauntless Manifesto. In the same year, Puerto Rican singer Myke Towers and American producer Benny Blanco used the song as a melodic base in their song "Degenere".

In 2025, K-pop girl group Ive interpolated the song in their title track "Attitude".
