= Luka (song) =

1987 single by Suzanne Vega

- North American, French and Japanese picture sleeve

Single by Suzanne Vega

from the album Solitude Standing
- B-side: "Night Vision"
- Released: May 15, 1987
- Genre: Folk rock; pop rock
- Length: 3:48
- Label: A&M
- Songwriter: Suzanne Vega
- Producers: Steve Addabbo; Lenny Kaye

Suzanne Vega singles chronology
"Gypsy" (1986)	"Luka" (1987)	"Tom's Diner" (1987)

Music video
- "Luka" on YouTube

"Luka" is a song written and performed by American singer-songwriter Suzanne Vega, released as the second single from her second studio album, Solitude Standing, on May 15, 1987, in the United Kingdom and on May 21, 1987, in the United States by A&M Records. It is her highest-charting hit in the United States, reaching number three on the Billboard Hot 100. Worldwide, the song charted the highest in Sweden, peaking at No. 2, and reached the top 10 in Austria, Canada, New Zealand, and South Africa. Shawn Colvin sings backing vocals on the record. It also earned Vega nominations for the 1988 Grammy Awards, including Record of the Year, Song of the Year and Best Female Pop Vocal Performance. Vega also recorded a Spanish-language version of the song, included on the single release.

== Subject ==
The song deals with the issue of child abuse. On a 1987 Swedish television special, Vega revealed her inspiration for Luka:

A few years ago, I used to see this group of children playing in front of my building, and there was one of them, whose name was Luka, who seemed a little bit distinctive from the other children. I always remembered his name, and I always remembered his face, and I didn't know much about him, but he just seemed set apart from these other children that I would see playing. And his character is what I based the song Luka on. In the song, the boy Luka is an abused child—in real life I don't think he was. I think he was just different.

In a Dutch video documentary by Top 2000 à gogo in December 2018, Vega spoke about the meaning of the song:

I wanted to write about child abuse… I had to think of how to write about a subject that no-one talks about.

In 2021, she revealed that the song dealt with the emotional and physical abuse she had suffered from her stepfather, Edgardo Vega Yunqué, also known as Ed Vega, who was a novelist and professor from Puerto Rico.

"There was abuse in my family... I am actually Luka."

In 2023, she similarly told German radio Station Bayern 2 the song is about her own experience with physical abuse:

I chose Luka as a name and as a character because I didn't want people to know that it was me.

== Music video ==
The accompanying music video for "Luka" was directed by Michael Patterson (who later went on to create MC Skat Kat) and Candice Reckinge. It was shot over three days in New York City. The part of Luka was played by actor Jason Cerbone (who years later played Jackie Aprile Jr. on the crime drama television series The Sopranos), who was chosen after the directors auditioned more than 90 children for the part.

== Reception ==
The song reached number three on Billboard Hot 100 and was nominated for Grammy Award for Song of the Year in 1988.

After the death of musician Prince in 2016, Suzanne Vega posted on social media a picture of a letter that she received from Prince in 1987, in which he praised her song.

== Charts ==
=== Weekly charts ===
Chart (1987)	Peak position
Australia (Kent Music Report)	21
Austria (Ö3 Austria Top 40)	9
Belgium (Ultratop 50 Flanders)	33
Canada Top Singles (RPM)	5
Europe (European Hot 100 Singles)	65
Finland (Suomen virallinen lista)	21
France (SNEP)	24
Ireland (IRMA)	11
Italy Airplay (Music & Media)	11
Netherlands (Dutch Top 40)	26
Netherlands (Single Top 100)	40
New Zealand (Recorded Music NZ)	8
South Africa (Springbok Radio)	3
Sweden (Sverigetopplistan)	2
UK Singles (Official Charts)	23
US Billboard Hot 100	3
US Adult Contemporary (Billboard)	3
US Hot Latin Songs (Billboard)	48
US Mainstream Rock (Billboard)	15
US Cash Box Top 100	4

Chart (2016–2020)	Peak position
Poland Airplay (ZPAV)	97
Slovenia (SloTop50)	49

Chart (2025)	Peak position
Israel International Airplay (Media Forest)	17

=== Year-end charts ===
Chart (1987)	Position
Canada Top Singles (RPM)	31
US Billboard Hot 100	52

== Follow-up ==
During a 2012 episode of BBC Radio 4's Mastertapes, Vega revealed that she had written a follow-up to "Luka", from the point of view of the character as he looked back on his life. The song, titled "Song of the Stoic", later appeared on her eighth studio album Tales from the Realm of the Queen of Pentacles (2014).
