= Dose (Latin Playboys album) =

Studio album by Latin Playboys
- Released: March 2, 1999
- Studio: Sunset Sound Factory
- Genres: Alternative rock, experimental rock
- Length: 34:54
- Label: Atlantic Records
- Producer: Mitchell Froom

Latin Playboys chronology
| Latin Playboys (1994) | Dose (1999) |

Dose is the second studio album by the American alternative rock band Latin Playboys. It was released on March 2, 1999 on Atlantic Records. The album was produced by Mitchell Froom and engineered by Tchad Blake, both of whom are also members of the band. As the album's engineer, Blake recorded all of the background sounds that appear on the album.

== Recording ==
Dose was primarily recorded at the home of one of the band's members, David Hidalgo, on an 8-track tape. It was engineered at Tchad Blake's Sunset Sound Factory in Hollywood.

== Release and marketing ==
Dose was released on March 2, 1999 by Atlantic Records, which decided not to release a single from it. Atlantic's product manager, Pat Creed, told CMJ New Music Report that he wanted people to find their own favorite track on the album, which he described as "not your typical radio record, but...one of those great things that is an album, something that hangs together well.

== Music and lyrics ==
Hidalgo said in 1999 that Dose had a significantly different sound than the group's self-titled debut. He told the Washington Post that:

"The first Latin Playboys record was little impressions, snippets, snapshots almost, like driving in a car through different neighborhoods and you just get a quick look at something. This one has more realized songs. It's just a natural progression. We're in it for the ride. A lot of times we don't know where we're going. You have to wait and be patient and see where the music is going. Once you get a handle on it, then you can steer it where it's already going."

Brett Anderson of Salon wrote in his review of the album that "Experimentalism doesn’t get any more organic than this. Hidalgo still sings like he’s trying to do his bittersweet memories justice, and even the looped and distorted guitars seem to echo from a more coherent place." The album's lyrics cover many disparate aspects of the experience of L.A.'s's East Side.

Professional ratings
Review scores
| Source | Rating |
|---|---|
| AllMusic | 2/5 stars |
| Chicago Tribune | (unrated) |
| Christgau's Consumer Guide | A |
| Los Angeles Times | 3/4 stars |
| The New York Times | (favorable) |
| No Depression | (favorable) |
| Spin | 8/10 |

== Track listing ==
1. "Fiesta Erotica" – 3:09
2. "Cuca's Blues" – 3:15
3. "Ironsides" – 1:46
4. "Mustard" – 3:29
5. "Nubian Priestess" – 2:00
6. "Dose" – 2:33
7. "Latin Trip" – 2:58
8. "Tormenta Blvd." – 2:09
9. "Lemon 'N Ice" – 3:50
10. "Locoman" – 2:49
11. "Toro" – 0:38
12. "Paletero" – 3:13
13. "Paula Y Fred" – 3:06

== Personnel ==
=== Latin Playboys ===
- David Hidalgo
- Louie Perez
- Mitchell Froom
- Tchad Blake

=== Other personnel ===
- Tracy Bonham - violin
- Lisa Coleman - guest vocals
- John Heiden - design
- S. Husky Höskulds - assistant engineer
- Bob Ludwig - mastering
- Jerry Marotta - drums, percussion
- Wendy Melvoin - guest vocals
- John Paterno - assistant engineer, mixing assistant
