= About Time (soundtrack) =

2013 soundtrack album by various artists

About Time (Original Motion Picture Soundtrack)

Soundtrack album by Various artists
- Released: 3 September 2013
- Genres: Pop; alternative rock; rhythm and blues; indie rock
- Length: 57:25
- Label: Decca
- Producer: Pete Hutchinson

About Time (Original Motion Picture Soundtrack) is the soundtrack to the 2013 film of the same name directed by Richard Curtis. The soundtrack was released on 3 September 2013 by Decca Records, and featured contemporary hits from the 1990s and early 2000s. The album featured selections from The Cure, The Killers, Ellie Goulding, Amy Winehouse, Sugababes and Nick Cave, while Ben Folds also performed a newer version of his single "The Luckiest" for the film. It also featured a song from Nick Laird-Clowes who also composed the film score.

== Reception ==
Andrew Le of Renowned for Sound wrote "the About Time soundtrack depicts the variety of experiences of life such as love, heartbreak, joy, reflection and confusion. Combining piano and orchestral songs with uptempo, modern pop classics may seem daft on paper, but it somehow works on record. This is so because the soundtrack is simply a fine, eclectic selection of songs. Actually, it would have been even more effective if it ended with Spiegel Im Spiegel." James Christopher Monger of AllMusic wrote "the soundtrack dutifully reflects its story's time travel premise with a 17-song set of (mostly) previously released selections from the likes of the Killers, Groove Armada, Amy Winehouse and Nick Cave. Nick Laird Clowes offers up a pair of wistful piano pieces ("Golborne Road" and "The About Time Theme") from his evocative score."

Leslie Felperin of Variety wrote "Soundtrack choices are at times painfully twee, and the overuse of that already overexposed tearjerker, Arvo Part’s 'Spiegel im Spiegel,' particularly grates. Still, music producer Steve McLaughlin (no music supervisor is credited) gets a pass for using Nick Cave’s immortal 'Into My Arms' in a key moment that will inspire those planning their own funerals in advance." Richard Corliss of Time wrote "Curtis underscores his theme with a half-dozen love songs. Mike Scott’s 'How Long Will I Love You?' snakes through the film; 'I Will Always Love You,' 'When I Fall in Love' and 'Where or When' also dot the soundtrack. The songs are plangent and irony-free, and so is the movie." Karenna Meredith of Popsugar wrote "soundtrack matches every peak and valley of the plotline".

== Track listing ==
No.	Title	Artist	Length
1.	"The Luckiest" (About Time version)	Ben Folds	4:04
2.	"How Long Will I Love You"	Jon Boden, Sam Sweeney & Ben Coleman	2:46
3.	"Mid Air"	Paul Buchanan	2:28
4.	"At the River" (Radio Edit)	Groove Armada	3:10
5.	"Friday I'm In Love"	The Cure	3:34
6.	"Back To Black" (Explicit)	Amy Winehouse	4:00
7.	"Gold in them Hills"	Ron Sexsmith	3:31
8.	"The About Time Theme"	Nick Laird-Clowes	2:22
9.	"Into My Arms"	Nick Cave & The Bad Seeds	4:13
10.	"Il Mondo"	Jimmy Fontana	2:42
11.	"Golborne Road"	Nick Laird-Clowes	2:16
12.	"Push the Button"	Sugababes	3:37
13.	"All the Things She Said" (Original Edited)	t.A.T.u.	3:35
14.	"When I Fall In Love"	Barbar Gough, Sagat Guirey, Andy Hamill & Tim Herniman	3:02
15.	"Spiegel im Spiegel"	Arvo Pärt	9:24
16.	"How Long Will I Love You?"	Ellie Goulding	2:34

== Chart performance ==
Chart (2018)	Peak position
UK Compilation Albums (OCC)	42
UK Soundtrack Albums (OCC)	5
