= Summer Rains (album) =

Studio album by the Ditty Bops
- Released: 2008
- Studio: Coconut Guys
- Genre: Indie folk
- Producer: Mitchell Froom; The Ditty Bops

The Ditty Bops chronology
Moon Over the Freeway (2006)	Summer Rains (2008)

Summer Rains is the third studio album from the folk/swing band the Ditty Bops, released in 2008. The album was nominated for a Grammy in the category Best Recording Package.

== Track listing ==
1. "Summer Rains" – 3:20
2. "When's She Comin' Home" – 2:56
3. "Skinny Bones" – 3:11
4. "What Happened to the Radio" – 2:42
5. "The Next Best Thing" – 2:34
6. "Because We Do" – 2:38
7. "Interlude for Ten Strings" – 2:05
8. "I Stole Your Wishes" – 2:39
9. "All Over You" – 2:50
10. "Feel From The Outside In" – 3:01
11. "The Weeds Are Winning" – 3:20
12. "Sugar and Spice" – 3:49

== Personnel ==
- Abby DeWald – vocals, acoustic guitar, piano (track 8), charango (track 5), producer
- Amanda Barrett – vocals, mandolin, ukulele, steel drum, producer
- David Boucher – baritone sax
- Mitchell Froom – keyboards, producer
- Jesca Hoop – vocals (tracks 3, 4, 10)
- John Lambdin – lap steel, violin, guitar (track 9)
- Kaveh Rastegar – bass
- Greg Rutledge – piano, whistle
- Pete Thomas – drums, percussion
- Rick Whitmore – album package creation
