= Kyp Harness =

Canadian social activist and folk singer (born 1964)

Kyp Harness Kyp Harness
- Born: December 9, 1964 (age 61)
- Origin: Canada
- Occupations: Social activist and folk singer

Kyp Harness (born December 9, 1964) is a Canadian social activist and folk singer, known for the poetry of his lyrics.

== Biography ==
Harness was born in Sarnia, Ontario in 1964. He arrived in Toronto, Ontario in 1984 and began playing in coffee houses and open stages across the city, most notably Fat Albert's, where he met fellow songwriters Ron Sexsmith, Bob Wiseman, and Bob Snider.

In 1987, Harness recorded a demo tape with Bob Wiseman, then of Canadian roots-rock group Blue Rodeo. Songs from the recording emerged with others on Harness' debut release Nowhere Fast in 1991. From the beginning, the bleak, wry poetry found on the admittedly low-fi release attracted attention, with Crash Magazine declaring "Kyp has his own style. It may not be a style that everyone likes, but there are those of us who think he's a kind of genius".

Harness' first CD release, God's Footstool (Amatish), followed in 1992. Drummer Don Kerr produced the album, diverging from the bare-bones sound of 'Nowhere Fast' to implement cello, trumpet, and sax in creating a more colourful backdrop for Harness' circusy/cinematic lyrics. Canadian Composer noted it was "an album that sparkles with rich, vital imagery and audacious song arrangements", with Bob Wiseman proclaiming in the same article "He's a genius, a revolutionary...he creates pieces that are dense with imagery yet are continually stimulating, informative and innovative."

In 1994 Harness released Welcome to the Revolution (Amatish), a stark album of raw folk-based music, which included intensely narrative-driven songs like "Song for a Man", "Ballad of Curtis Merton", "Jackson Homer" and "Chemical Valley", painting pictures of alienation, Everyman angst, environmental collapse, and apocalyptic fury. Melodic laments such as 'Wayward Son' and 'Remember Love' offered some respite from the grimness, and overall the release featured some of Harness' finest writing. The Toronto Star called it one of the year's "most passionate and articulate albums". A video shot on super 8 mm and 16 mm film for "Chemical Valley" was released in 1995 by Toronto-based director Liz Marshall.

Houdini in Reverse was released in 1998, an upbeat pop/rock band-driven album featuring Harness classics "Good Old Days", "Old Grey House", and "You're the One". The record prompted Id Magazine to observe that "Harness is an urban poet of the highest order; no-one who cares about the state of songwriting in this country or any other can afford to ignore him any longer". The Calgary Straight noted "I won't mince words: Right now, Kyp Harness is the most vital, essential Canadian singer-songwriter out there."

Harness released All Her Love in 2001 with the Porterbeach label, presenting a country-tinged selection of songs. The lyrics told stories commenting on, as The Peterborough Examiner put it, "the fragility of human existence". Toronto's eye magazine remarked "Harness is one of the best songwriters this city – if not this country – has ever seen".

Porterbeach also released the double album The Floating World in 2002, a tour de force of 26 songs running the gamut from solo acoustic ballads to bar-room rockers featuring the avant-garde rock trio The Dinner Is Ruined. The first disc mixes the rockers with spirituals and ballads, while the second disc focuses on acoustic songs about death and mortality. Exclaim! magazine stated "Harness has assembled a songbook which should rightly be regarded as a national treasure". Heaven, an alt-country magazine from the Netherlands proclaimed him "one of the best songwriters in the world", while The Moncton Transcript observed "...he is one of the finest songwriters this country has produced."

The Miracle Business (Porterbeach) followed in 2004, a more focussed album produced by David Matheson, formerly of the pop group Moxy Früvous. One of Harness' most polished recordings, the album contains the pop songs "Diamonds in the Air" and "Mayor of Crazytown" as well as poetic pieces such as "Horseman" and "Fields of Plenty". Porterbeach also put out a book of Harness' lyrics to date, Journey to the Sun, containing the words to 101 songs.

Fugitives in 2006 found Harness affirming his Christian faith with such proclamations as "Man on the Cross", "Devil's Got a Foothold in your Heart" and "Calm Down", and in the liner notes he describes his vision of God as "far from being a mascot for war, for stealing from the poor to give to the rich, for anti-choice and sexual discrimination." Harness revealed another aspect of his talent with the release of his book The Art of Laurel and Hardy in 2006. The book is an idiosyncratic study of the 1930s comedy team published by McFarland in North Carolina.

In 2007, McFarland published 'The Art of Charlie Chaplin' by Kyp Harness.

In 2009 Harness launched a webcomic, Mortimer the Slug, which updates every weekday.

In 2011, Harness released his ninth independent album, Resurrection Gold.

Harness has been associated with other Canadian singer songwriters, such as Daniel Lanois, Kathleen Yearwood, who covers three Harness songs on her Doglogic album. Mary Margaret O'Hara, Bob Wiseman and Ron Sexsmith, who covers Harness' "Thumbelina Farewell" on his Blue Boy album (2001). Lanois calls him a "great writer", and Ron Sexsmith refers to him as "my favourite songwriter...it's his lyrics that set him apart. They are every bit as powerful as the best Dylan, Cohen and Lennon combined." Exclaim's Michael Barclay stated in 2003 that Harness's work "should rightfully be hailed as a national treasure."

In 2016, Harness published his debut novel Wigford Rememberies. The book won the ReLit Award for Fiction in 2017. He received another ReLit nomination in 2019 for The Abandoned.

Harness is based in Toronto and has two children with his wife and poet Allison Grayhurst.

== Discography ==
- Nowhere Fast – 1991
- God's Footstool (Amatish) – 1992
- Welcome to the Revolution (Amatish) – 1994
- Houdini in Reverse – 1998
- All Her Love (Porterbeach) – 2001
- The Floating World (Porterbeach) – 2002
- The Miracle Business (Porterbeach) – 2004
- Fugitives – 2006
- Resurrection Gold – 2011
- The Wrong Way – 2012
- Can a Poor Man Get a Fair Trial? – 2012
- Armageddon Blues – 2014
- Stoplight Moon – (2016)
- Kyp Harness – 2018
- Red Revolver – 2021
- Poverty Line – 2022
- Kick the Dust – 2024
