= The Less I Know =

The Less I Know may refer to:

- "The Less I Know", a song by Ron Sexsmith from Cobblestone Runway
- "The Less I Know", a song by OneRepublic from Oh My My

== See also ==
- "The Less I Know the Better", a song by Tame Impala
- The Less I Knew, an album by James Vincent McMorrow
