= Latin Playboys (album) =

Studio album by Latin Playboys
- Released: March 8, 1994
- Studio: Big Stink Studios, Hercules, CA & at Sunset Sound Factory, Hollywood
- Genre: Experimental rock; Chicano rock; Latin rock; Tex-Mex; blues rock
- Length: 37:09
- Label: Slash/Warner Bros.
- Producer: Latin Playboys

Latin Playboys chronology
| Latin Playboys (1994) | Dose (1999) |

Latin Playboys is the debut album by the experimental rock band Latin Playboys, released on March 8, 1994 through Slash/Warner Bros. Records.

== Production ==
Latin Playboys was recorded in a short time and recorded almost entirely on a four-track tape machine. The band divided the songwriting duties into stages with David Hidalgo preparing the musical sketches of each song, which were passed to Louie Pérez, who added lyrics and rhythms. Mitchell Froom and Tchad Blake further flowered the songs with samples and other instrumentation.

== Composition ==
Latin Playboys has been defined as a fusion of R&B, tejano music, rock, soul, blues, garage rock, mariachi, and progressive jazz. The reviewer for Chicago Tribune, Mark Caro, considered the album to be "clearly a side project", characterizing the compositions as aren't really "structured pop songs as much as little explorations guided by a compass operating under mysterious forces". Caro described these forces as fascinating, evocative and "even strangely sensual".

Caro compared the "frightening backdrop of rushing pulse beats" of the song "Crayon Sun" to the Velvet Underground's "Heroin". The album opener, "Viva la Raza", was compared to My Life in the Bush of Ghosts as if it was imagined by Astor Piazzolla.

== Critical reception ==
Professional ratings
Review scores
| Source | Rating |
|---|---|
| AllMusic | 3/5 stars |
| Chicago Tribune | 3.5/4 stars |
| Christgau's Consumer Guide | A+ |
| Entertainment Weekly | B+ |
| Los Angeles Times | 3.5/4 stars |
| The Philadelphia Inquirer | 3.5/4 stars |
| Rolling Stone | 4/5 stars |
| Spin Alternative Record Guide | 9/10 |

Robert Christgau of The Village Voice named the album the best release of 1994 and described it as "impressionistic fragments coalescing into a self-sustaining aural counterreality." Writing for The A.V. Club, Joshua Klein called the album a "casual masterpiece" consisting of "found sounds, low-fidelity recording techniques, distorted drum loops, deep-dungeon blues, fragmented guitar parts, and some gorgeous songs." In his AllMusic review, Richie Unterberger stated that the album's "lyrics and song structures are almost impressionistic in tone, creating an effect similar to listening to your car radio as stations drift in and out of reach while you drive along the Mexican border." Christgau later named it among his 10 best albums from the 1990s.

Mark Caro, summarizing his listening experience for Chicago Tribune, described it as a journey with an undetermined destination, "yet the journey somehow makes sense in the end". The Rolling Stone reviewer thought it showcased "new musical ideas as possibilities", realized during the recording sessions with technical limitations and minimal edits—"the music is fresh and open, unconcerned with the refinement of aesthetic closure".

== Track listing ==
All songs written by David Hidalgo and Louie Pérez.

1. "Viva la Raza" – 2:45
2. "Ten Believers" – 3:17
3. "Chinese Surprize" – 3:07
4. "Mira!" – 1:22
5. "Manifold de Amour" – 2:02
6. "New Zandu" – 3:11
7. "Rudy's Party" – 2:28
8. "If" – 1:41
9. "Same Brown Earth" – 3:45
10. "Lagoon" – 2:24
11. "Gone" – 2:51
12. "Crayon Sun" – 3:04
13. "Pink Steps" – 2:07
14. "Forever Night Shade Mary" – 3:05

== Personnel ==
Adapted from the album's liner notes:

- Latin Playboys (David Hidalgo, Louie Perez, Mitchell Froom, and Tchad Blake) – recording, engineering, mixing, producering
- Bob Ludwig – mastering
- John Paterno – mixing
