= Over My Shoulder =

Over My Shoulder may refer to:

- Over My Shoulder (album), by Mel Parsons, 2009
- "Over My Shoulder" (Mike + The Mechanics song), 1995
- "Over My Shoulder" (I Am Kloot song), 2005
- "Over My Shoulder", a song by Mika from Life in Cartoon Motion, 2007
- "Over My Shoulder", a song by The Jayhawks from Tomorrow the Green Grass, 1995
