= Slow Burn =

Slow Burn or Slowburn may refer to:

== Film and television ==
- Slow Burn (1986 film) by Matthew Chapman starring Eric Roberts and Johnny Depp
- Slow Burn (1989 film) by John Eyres starring William Smith, Anthony James and Ivan Rogers
- Slow Burn (2000 film) by Christian Ford starring Minnie Driver, James Spader and Josh Brolin
- Slow Burn (2005 film) by Wayne Beach starring Ray Liotta, Jolene Blalock and LL Cool J
- Slow Burn, a 2020 documentary series on Epix based on the TV adaptation of the Slow Burn podcast

== Music ==
=== Bands ===
- Slowburn (band)
- Slo Burn, an American stoner rock band

=== Albums ===
- Slow Burn (Mel Parsons album), 2022
- Slow Burn (Sev Statik album), 2005
- Slow Burn (Conquer Divide album), 2023
- Slow to Burn, 1996 album by Vanessa Daou

=== Songs ===
- "Slow Burn" (Atreyu song), 2007
- "Slow Burn" (David Bowie song), 2002
- "Slow Burn" (T.G. Sheppard song), 1983
- "Slow Burn", 2015 song by Apocalyptica from Shadowmaker
- "Slow Burn", 2017 song by Bug Hunter on the album Torn Between a Couple
- "Slow Burn", 2023 song by Infinity Song on the album Metamorphosis
- "Slow Burn", 2018 song by Kacey Musgraves on the album Golden Hour
- "Slow Burn", 2022 title song by the Mel Parsons on the album Slow Burn
- "Slow Burn", 1994 song by the Screamin' Cheetah Wheelies
- "Slow Burn", 2016 song by Tim Hicks from Shake These Walls
- "Slow Burn", 2021 song by Wage War from Manic
- "Slow Burn", 2023 song by The Word Alive from Hard Reset
- "Slowburn" (Corey Hart song), 1990
- "Slowburn" (Peter Gabriel song), 1977
- "Slowburn", 2014 song by Code Orange from I Am King
- "Slowburn", 2005 song by Rev Theory (formerly known as Revelation Theory)

== Other uses ==
- Slow Burn (podcast), a 2017 podcast hosted by Leon Neyfakh
- Slowburn, a romance imprint of Zando
