= Glass Heart =

Studio album by Mel Parsons
- Released: 30 November 2018
- Genres: Indie folk, Americana, alternative country, country rock
- Length: 33:19
- Labels: Cape Road Recordings, Native Tongue Music
- Producer: Mitchell Froom

Mel Parsons chronology
Drylands (2015)	Glass Heart (2018)	Slow Burn (2022)

Professional ratings
Review scores
Source	Rating
The Music	4/5 stars
Newcastle Herald	4/5 stars

Glass Heart is Mel Parsons's fourth album, released on 30 November 2018 on Cape Road Recordings. The concept of the album name came from comparing ones heart to a fragile object that smashes if it is dropped.

== Album development ==
Parsons wrote the songs of the album starting in 2017 in Lyttelton, New Zealand, but many of the songs were born from insomnia while touring, or holed up in remote isolated cabins with a piano in Washington. Many of the songs were written in North America, in Ohio, the Midwest, California, and on Prince Edward Island in Canada. Although Parsons is constantly writing songs, the songs that were recorded were her most recently written. The producer, Mitchell Froom, wasn't told which were the newly written songs or the older ones, but he shelved the older ones, not feeling the needed vibe.

Glass Heart is the first album Parsons recorded outside of New Zealand, in Santa Monica, California, USA. The recording location was a result of linking up with producer Mitchell Froom, who was suggested to Parsons by Ron Sexsmith when he performed a duet with Parsons on a track on her Drylands album. After hearing Drylands, Froom agreed to work with Parsons, and they had a trial run in the studio in 2017 to determine if they were compatible, which they decided they were. Froom had a window of opportunity to record with Parsons in between a couple of albums he was producing, while Parsons was touring solo across North America. Even though Parsons had a backing band back in New Zealand, but it was impractical to bring them to the US for the recording sessions, so Froom assembled the band from local musicians, Kaveh Rastegar who plays bass for John Legend and Sia, Adam Levy who plays guitar for Norah Jones, and Ted Poor who plays drums for Andrew Bird. Parsons stepped away from co-producer duty for this album, and under the helm of Froom most of the songs were first or second takes, with Parsons singing her vocals live to tape for the majority of the tracks.

== Track list ==
All tracks are written by Mel Parsons

No.	Title	Length
1.	"Blame"	3:28
2.	"I Got the Lonely"	3:02
3.	"Glass Heart"	3:08
4.	"Just 'Cause You Don't Want Me"	3:19
5.	"Deadwood"	3:56
6.	"Dream Find"	4:10
7.	"Breaking"	2:42
8.	"Come Over Lover"	3:03
9.	"Bottom of the Street"	3:21
10.	"What Would You Change"	3:10

== Personnel ==
Musicians

- Mel Parsons – vocals, guitars
- Adam Levy – guitars
- Kaveh Rastegar – bass
- Ted Poor – drums
- Mitchell Froom – keyboards
- Josh Logan – vocals
- Jed Parsons – vocals

Production

- Mitchell Froom – producer
- Oliver Harmer – mastering
- David Boucher – engineering, mixing
- Lisa MacIntosh – photography
- Barny Bewick – cover design

== Chart ==
Chart (2018)	Peak position
New Zealand Albums (RMNZ)	11
New Zealand Independent Albums (IMNZ)	1
