= Sabotage (Mel Parsons album) =

Studio album by Mel Parsons
- Released: 7 June 2024
- Genres: Alt-country, indie folk
- Length: 28:50
- Label: Cape Road
- Producer: Josh Logan

Mel Parsons chronology
Slow Burn (2022)	Sabotage (2024)	Castle Hill (2026)

Professional ratings
Review scores
Source	Rating
Rolling Stone Australia	4/5 stars

Sabotage is the sixth album by New Zealand singer-songwriter Mel Parsons, released on 7 June 2024 on Cape Road Recordings.

== Development ==
Parsons began the process of writing the album with Josh Logan during the Covid lockdown. The creation process was a collaboration process between the two of them, jumping around on the instrumentation, with Parsons on guitars and some drums, and Logan on all other instruments. The album was recorded in Lyttleton at Basement Studio. The song "Hardest Thing" won the MLT Songwriting Award at the New Zealand Country Music Honours.

== Track listing ==
All tracks are written by Mel Parsons, except where noted

Sabotage track listing
No.	Title	Writer(s)	Length
1.	"Circling the City"	Parsons, Josh Logan	2:48
2.	"Offer Down"		3:03
3.	"Sabotage"		4:43
4.	"Little Sadness"	Parsons, Logan	3:40
5.	"5432"		3:41
6.	"Hoping for Rain"		4:56
7.	"Hardest Thing"		3:08
8.	"Expectations"	Parsons, Logan	2:50

== Personnel ==
Musicians

- Mel Parsons – vocals, guiter, drums
- Josh Logan – all instruments

Production

- Josh Logan – producer, mixing, recording
- Chris Chetland – mastering
- Steph Cartwright – photography
- Emma Hercus - cover artwork

== Charts ==
Chart performance for Sabotage
Chart (2024)	Peak position
New Zealand Albums (RMNZ)	5
