= Forever Endeavour =

Studio album by Ron Sexsmith
- Released: February 5, 2013
- Genre: Rock
- Length: 42:00
- Label: Cooking Vinyl
- Producer: Mitchell Froom

Ron Sexsmith chronology
| Long Player Late Bloomer (2011) | Forever Endeavour (2013) | Carousel One (2015) |

Professional ratings
Aggregate scores
| Source | Rating |
|---|---|
| Metacritic | 74/100 |
Review scores
| Source | Rating |
| Allmusic | 4/5 stars |
| Record Collector | 4/5 stars |
| Now | 4/5 stars |

Forever Endeavour is the 13th studio album by Canadian singer-songwriter Ron Sexsmith. It was published in February 2013 under Cooking Vinyl Records, and produced by Mitchell Froom.

The album won the Juno Award for Adult Alternative Album of the Year at the Juno Awards of 2014.

== Track list ==
| No. | Title | Length |
|---|---|---|
| 1. | "Nowhere to Go" | 3:17 |
| 2. | "Nowhere Is" | 3:32 |
| 3. | "If Only Avenue" | 3:07 |
| 4. | "Snake Road" | 3:31 |
| 5. | "Blind Eye" | 3:31 |
| 6. | "Lost in Thought" | 2:19 |
| 7. | "Sneak Out the Back Door" | 2:42 |
| 8. | "Back of My Hand" | 2:51 |
| 9. | "Deepens With Time" | 3:07 |
| 10. | "Me Myself and Wine" | 2:36 |
| 11. | "She Does My Heart Good" | 2:40 |
| 12. | "The Morning Light" | 2:53 |
| 13. | "Life After a Broken Heart" | 3:00 |
| 14. | "Autumn Light" | 2:54 |

== Personnel ==
- Calder Group – strings
- Matt Chamberlain – drums, percussion
- Davey Faragher – bass
- Mitchell Froom – keyboards
- Bob Glaub – bass
- Joshua Heapley – strings
- Don Heffington – drums, percussion
- Dan Higgins – woodwinds
- Charlene Huang – strings
- Hagai Izraeli – brass
- Greg Leisz – pedal steel
- Darrell Leonard – brass
- Val McCallum – electric guitar
- Joe Meyer – French horn
- Albert Romero – strings
- William Roper – tuba
- John Steinmetz – brass
- Lori Stuntz – tuba
- Pete Thomas – drums, percussion
- Michael Urbano – drums, percussion
- Ron Sexsmith – vocals, guitar
