= Ron Sexsmith (album) =

Studio album by Ron Sexsmith
- Released: May 16, 1995
- Studio: Dreamland Recording Studios, Hurley, New York; The Sound Factory, Hollywood; Master Control, Burbank, California
- Genre: Rock
- Length: 42:57
- Label: Interscope
- Producer: Mitchell Froom

Ron Sexsmith chronology
Grand Opera Lane (1991)	Ron Sexsmith (1995)	Other Songs (1997)

Professional ratings
Review scores
Source	Rating
AllMusic	4.5/5 stars
Encyclopedia of Popular Music	4/5 stars
The Guardian	4/5 stars
Los Angeles Times	3/4 stars
NME	7/10
The Philadelphia Inquirer	2.5/4 stars
Q	4/5 stars
Rolling Stone	3/5 stars
The Rolling Stone Album Guide	3.5/5 stars
USA Today	3.5/4 stars

Ron Sexsmith is the second album and major-label debut album by Canadian singer-songwriter Ron Sexsmith, released in 1995 on Interscope Records. The album's liner notes feature a dedication to Harry Nilsson. "Secret Heart" appeared in The X Files episode Babylon.

== Track listing ==
All tracks are written by Ronald Eldon Sexsmith, except where noted

No.	Title	Writer(s)	Length
1.	"Secret Heart"		3:16
2.	"There's a Rhythm"		3:11
3.	"Words We Never Use"		3:04
4.	"Summer Blowin' Town"		2:19
5.	"Lebanon, Tennessee"		2:58
6.	"Speaking with the Angel"		3:38
7.	"In Place of You"		3:34
8.	"Heart with No Companion"	Leonard Cohen	3:10
9.	"Several Miles"		3:40
10.	"From a Few Streets Over"		2:43
11.	"First Chance I Get"		2:04
12.	"Wastin' Time"		2:47
13.	"Galbraith Street"		3:08
14.	"There's a Rhythm" (reprise)		3:25

Japanese edition bonus track
No.	Title	Length
15.	"Almost Always"	4:04

== Personnel ==
- Ron Sexsmith - vocals, guitar, backing vocals; piano, bass and drums on "There's a Rhythm"
- Jerry Scheff - bass
- Mitchell Froom - keyboards
- Jerry Marotta - drums, percussion, backing vocals

with:

- Steve Amedee - tambourine on "Words We Never Use" and "Heart With No Companion"
- Martin Tillman - cello on "Speaking With the Angel" and "Several Miles"
- Tchad Blake - effects on "From a Few Streets Over"
- Daniel Lanois - electric guitar on "There's a Rhythm"
- Pierre Marchand - accordion on "There's a Rhythm"

Technical

- Tchad Blake - recording, mixing
- John Paterno - additional recording
- Daniel Lanois - producer on "There's a Rhythm", photography
