= Moon Over the Freeway =

Studio album by the Ditty Bops
- Released: May 23, 2006
- Genre: Swing; ragtime; folk
- Length: 37:25
- Label: Warner Bros.
- Producer: Mitchell Froom; The Ditty Bops

The Ditty Bops chronology
The Ditty Bops (2004)	Moon Over the Freeway (2006)	Summer Rains (2008)

Professional ratings
Review scores
Source	Rating
AllMusic	4/5 stars

Moon Over the Freeway is the second studio album from the folk/swing band the Ditty Bops, released in 2006. Package artwork is by Rick Whitmore and photography is by Don Spiro.

== Track listing ==
1. "Moon Over The Freeway" – 3:15
2. "Angel With An Attitude" – 2:31
3. "Fall Awake" – 3:40
4. "Aluminum Can" – 3:28
5. "Fish To Fry" – 3:09
6. "In The Meantime" – 2:39
7. "It's A Shame" – 2:18
8. "Waking Up In The City" – 3:15
9. "Growing Upside Down" – 2:48
10. "Get Up 'N' Go" – 2:12
11. "Bye Bye Love" – 2:33
12. "Nosy Neighbor" – 3:04
13. "Your Head's Too Big" – 2:33

== Personnel ==
- Abby DeWald – vocals, acoustic guitar
- Amanda Barrett – vocals, mandolin, washboard
- Greg Rutledge – piano, accordion
- Ian Walker – bass
- John Lambdin – violin, lap steel, guitar
- Mitchell Froom – keyboards
- Pete Thomas – drums, percussion
- Davey Faragher – electric bass
- Val McCallum – electric guitar
- Rich Sherwood – drums
