= The Ditty Bops (album) =

Studio album by the Ditty Bops
- Released: October 26, 2004
- Genre: Folk; swing; bluegrass
- Length: 36:09
- Label: Warner Bros.
- Producer: Mitchell Froom; The Ditty Bops

The Ditty Bops chronology
The Ditty Bops (2004)	Moon Over the Freeway (2006)

Professional ratings
Review scores
Source	Rating
AllMusic	3.5/5 stars

The Ditty Bops is the self-titled debut album by the folk/swing band the Ditty Bops. Released on Warner Bros. Records in 2004, it features a cover of the old standard "Sister Kate".

Five tracks from the album were featured on the television show Grey's Anatomy ("Walk or Ride", "Wishful Thinking", "Sister Kate", "There's a Girl" and "Wake Up").

== Track listing ==
1. "Walk or Ride" – 3:11
2. "Wishful Thinking" – 2:39
3. "Ooh La La" – 3:53
4. "Sister Kate" – 2:25
5. "Breeze Black Night" – 2:58
6. "Gentle Sheep" – 3:24
7. "Pale Yellow" – 2:46
8. "Four Left Feet" – 2:48
9. "There's a Girl" – 3:02
10. "Unfortunate Few" – 4:02
11. "Short Stacks" – 2:36
12. "Wake Up" – 2:25
