= Drylands (album) =

Studio album by Mel Parsons
- Released: 10 April 2015
- Genres: Folk-pop, indie folk
- Length: 51:27
- Label: Cape Road Recordings
- Producers: Mel Parsons, Gerry Paul

Mel Parsons chronology
Red Grey Blue (2011)	Drylands (2015)	Glass Heart (2018)

Professional ratings
Review scores
Source	Rating
New Zealand Herald	5/5 stars
Otago Daily Times	4/5 stars
Pop Magazine	4/5 stars

Drylands is Mel Parsons' third album, released on 10 April 2015 on Cape Road Recordings. The album was recorded in engineer Lee Prebble's Surgery Studios in Wellington, New Zealand. One of the songs Parsons wrote was a duet, and she decided to cold e-mail Ron Sexsmith to see if he would perform the other half of the song "Don't Wait", and he agreed. Along with Ron Sexsmith, the album showcases local and international guest musicians Anika Moa, Vyvienne Long, and Trevor Hutchinson. Another song on the album, "Get Out Alive", is the result of her writing about a dangerous car accident she was in where the car rolled four times and was totaled, but she walked out without serious injury, but found herself re-evaluating her life for a time.

== Track list ==
All tracks are written by Mel Parsons

No.	Title	Length
1.	"Far Away"	3:37
2.	"Alberta Sun"	4:15
3.	"Driving Man"	4:33
4.	"Non Communicado"	3:48
5.	"Don't Wait" (featuring Ron Sexsmith)	3:43
6.	"Far North Coast"	3:36
7.	"Good Together"	3:22
8.	"Friend"	4:34
9.	"Get Out Alive"	3:45
10.	"Down So Long"	4:17
11.	"First Sign of Trouble"	4:18
12.	"Fireworks"	2:48
13.	"Another City"	4:51

== Personnel ==
Musicians

- Mel Parsons – vocals, guitar
- Gerry Paul - electric guitar, acoustic guitar, banjo, lap steel guitar
- Neil Watson - guitar
- Aaron Stewart - bass
- Trevor Hutchinson - double bass
- Craig Terris - drums
- Nick George - drums
- Ed Zuccollo - piano, Hammond organ
- Vyvienne Long - cello
- Ron Sexsmith - vocals (track 5)
- Anika Moa - backing vocals
- Andrew Keoghan - vocals (track 8)
- Lisa Tomlins - backing vocals (track 8)
- Anji Sami - backing vocals (track 8)
- Lex French - trumpet
- Ebony Lamb - choir (track 1)
- Anna Shaw - choir (track 1)
- Jamie Parlett - choir (track 1)
- Cameron "Dusty" Burnell - choir (track 1)
- Kim Bonnington - choir (track 1)
- Louis Thompson-Munn - choir (track 1)
- Imogen Holmstead-Scott - choir (track 1)
- Katie McCarthy-Burke - choir (track 1)
- Justin Firefly Clarke - choir (track 1)
- Manu Scott - choir (track 1)

Production

- Mel Parsons - producer
- Gerry Paul - producer
- Don Bartlye – mastering at Benchmark, Sydney
- Lee Prebble - engineering at the Surgery, Wellington, NZ, mixing (track 1)
- Trevor Hutchinson - additional engineering
- Don Kerr - additional engineering
- Jeremy Toy - additional engineering
- Oliver Harmer - mixing at The Lab, Auckland, NZ, additional engineering

== Chart ==
Chart	Peak position
NZ Top 40 Albums Chart	17
Top 20 IMNZ Albums	1

== Awards ==
- Best Country Music Song (Alberta Sun) – 2016 New Zealand Music Awards.
- Best Engineer (Lee Prebble and Oliver Harmer) - 2015 New Zealand Music Awards
