= Red Grey Blue =

Studio album by Mel Parsons
- Released: 19 September 2011
- Genres: Indie folk, alternative country
- Length: 38:51
- Label: Cape Road Recordings
- Producers: Mel Parsons, Jeremy Toy

Mel Parsons chronology
Over My Shoulder (2009)	Red Grey Blue (2011)	Drylands (2015)

Professional ratings
Review scores
Source	Rating
NZ Herald	3.5/5 stars

Red Grey Blue is Mel Parsons' second album, released on 19 September 2011 on Cape Road Recordings. The album features Anika Moa and Greg Johnson on harmonies, Bruce Lynch on double bass, and Don McGlashan on baritone horn, along with others. The album was recorded in Studio One, Boatshed Studios, and The Spare Room, in Auckland, New Zealand. The album was nominated for the Tui NZ Music Award's Folk Album of the Year. Parsons and her backing band the Rhythm Kings performed a 20 date New Zealand tour from 24 September 2011 to 5 November to showcase the album release.

== Track list ==
All tracks are written by Mel Parsons, except where noted

No.	Title	Writer(s)	Length
1.	"In My Heart"		3:02
2.	"I Won't Let You Down"		2:52
3.	"I'll Go"	Parsons, Jeremy Toy	3:11
4.	"Bones"		3:26
5.	"Damage"		3:39
6.	"Saturday Night"		4:22
7.	"Springtime Sun"		3:15
8.	"Things Will Get Good"		3:45
9.	"True Story"		3:32
10.	"We Will Find Love Again"		3:51
11.	"End of the Day"		3:56

== Personnel ==
Musicians

- Mel Parsons – vocals, guitar
- Jeremy Toy - guitar
- Neil Watson - guitar
- Alistair Deverick - drums
- Paul Taylor - percussion
- Bruce Lynch - double bass
- Anika Moa - vocal harmony
- Greg Johnson - vocal harmony
- Anji Sami - vocal harmony
- Don McGlashan - baritone horn, euphonium

Production

- Mel Parsons - producer
- Jeremy Toy - producer
- Don Bartley – mastering
- Andre Upston - engineering
- Dylan Luc du Plessis - album cover design

== Chart ==
Chart	Peak position
NZ Top 40 Albums Chart	27
Top 20 IMNZ Albums	8
