= Destination Unknown (Ron Sexsmith album) =

Studio album by Ron Sexsmith and Don Kerr
- Released: September 6, 2005
- Length: 40:14
- Label: V2
- Producer: Don Kerr

Ron Sexsmith and Don Kerr chronology
Retriever (2004)	Destination Unknown (2005)	Time Being (2006)

Professional ratings
Review scores
Source	Rating
AllMusic	4/5 stars

Destination Unknown is an album by Ron Sexsmith and Don Kerr, released on September 6, 2005. It is Ron Sexsmith’s ninth studio album and was received with critical acclaim.

== Track listing ==
1. "Listen" – 2:33
2. "One Less Shadow" – 2:53
3. "Lemonade Stand" – 3:31
4. "Reacquainted" – 3:26
5. "Chasing Forever" – 3:52
6. "Counting on Time" – 3:06
7. "Only Me" – 2:50
8. "You've Been Waiting" – 2:39
9. "Raindrops in My Coffee" – 2:35
10. "I've Been Away" – 2:51
11. "Diana Sweets" – 3:25
12. "Your Guess Is as Good as Mine" – 2:32
13. "Tree-Lined Streets" – 4:01

Japanese bonus tracks

14. "One Less Shadow" (live)
15. "Listen" (live)
