= Whereabouts =

Studio album by Ron Sexsmith
- Released: May 18, 1999
- Genre: Rock
- Length: 39:05
- Label: Interscope
- Producers: Tchad Blake, Mitchell Froom

Ron Sexsmith chronology
Other Songs (1997)	Whereabouts (1999)	Blue Boy (2001)

Professional ratings
Review scores
Source	Rating
AllMusic	4/5 stars
The Encyclopedia of Popular Music	4/5 stars
Rolling Stone	3.5/5 stars
Spin	8/10

Whereabouts is an album by Canadian singer-songwriter Ron Sexsmith, released in 1999 on Interscope Records. The album was a nominee for Roots & Traditional Album of the Year – Solo at the 2000 Juno Awards.

== Critical reception ==
Entertainment Weekly wrote that "producers Mitchell Froom and Tchad Blake do a wonderfully understated job of colorizing Sexsmith’s sad-kid melodies and voice." The Washington Post wrote that the album "suggests the songs of a less clever Elvis Costello sung by David Byrne in his most earnest mode." Rolling Stone called it "twelve near-perfect songs, the whole clocking in at under forty minutes." Trouser Press wrote: "Carrying along such instrumental window dressing as banjo, strings, woodwinds and horns, it is overly languorous and stylistically diverse." The New Yorker called the songs "either low-country laments or mid-tempo lullabies—minimalist heartbreakers all."

== Track listing ==
All tracks are written by Ronald Eldon Sexsmith.

No.	Title	Length
1.	"Still Time"	3:15
2.	"Right About Now"	2:48
3.	"Must Have Heard It Wrong"	2:15
4.	"Riverbed"	3:55
5.	"Feel for You"	3:42
6.	"In a Flash"	3:03
7.	"The Idiot Boy"	2:47
8.	"Beautiful View"	2:52
9.	"One Grey Morning"	3:56
10.	"Doomed"	3:25
11.	"Every Passing Day"	2:52
12.	"Seem to Recall"	4:15
Total length:		39:05

Japanese edition bonus track
No.	Title	Length
13.	"Tears Behind the Shades"	2:38
