= Carousel One =

Studio album by Ron Sexsmith
- Released: March 31, 2015
- Genre: Rock
- Length: 51:09
- Label: Compass
- Producer: Jim Scott

Ron Sexsmith chronology
Forever Endeavour (2013)	Carousel One (2015)

Professional ratings
Aggregate scores
Source	Rating
Metacritic	79/100
Review scores
Source	Rating
AllMusic	4/5 stars
Exclaim!	7/10

Carousel One is the 14th studio album by Canadian musician Ron Sexsmith. It was released in March 2015 under Compass Records. The title is a reference to the luggage retrieval belt at Los Angeles airport where bags from flights from Toronto are delivered.

== Critical reception ==
Kyle Mullin of Exclaim! praised Sexsmith's notably more upbeat sound and attitude on the record, writing that his "days of being pigeonholed as a sad sack are long gone."

== Track listing ==
Carousel One track listing
No.	Title	Length
1.	"Sure as the Sky"	2:57
2.	"Saint Bernard"	3:13
3.	"Loving You"	2:32
4.	"Before the Light Is Gone"	2:36
5.	"Lucky Penny"	3:51
6.	"Getaway Car"	2:51
7.	"Nothing Feels the Same Anymore"	4:04
8.	"Sun's Coming Out"	3:17
9.	"Lord Knows"	2:49
10.	"All Our Tomorrows"	4:03
11.	"No One"	3:18
12.	"Can't Get My Act Together"	3:18
13.	"Tumbling Sky"	2:17
14.	"Many Times"	2:45
15.	"The Other Side"	3:52
16.	"Is Anybody Going to San Antone"	3:26

Japanese bonus tracks
No.	Title	Length
17.	"Secret Heart" (Gavin Brown X Session)	3:23
18.	"Lebanon, Tennessee" (Gavin Brown X Session)	2:34
