= Exit Strategy of the Soul =

Studio album by Ron Sexsmith
- Released: 8 April 2008
- Length: 45:05
- Label: Kensaltown
- Producer: Martin Terefe

Ron Sexsmith chronology
Time Being (2006)	Exit Strategy of the Soul (2008)	Long Player Late Bloomer (2011)

Professional ratings
Aggregate scores
Source	Rating
Metacritic	70/100
Review scores
Source	Rating
AllMusic	3.5/5 stars
American Songwriter	3.5/5 stars
The A.V. Club	B+
Entertainment Weekly	C+
FasterLouder	4/5 stars
The Guardian	2/5 stars
Now	4/5 Ns
PopMatters	5/10
Record Collector	3/5 stars
World of Music	4.5/5 stars

Exit Strategy of the Soul is the eleventh studio album by Canadian singer-songwriter Ron Sexsmith, released on 8 April 2008, through Kensaltown.

== Track listing ==
All songs by Ronald Eldon Sexsmith except when specified.

1. "Spiritude" (instrumental) – 1:32
2. "This Is How I Know" – 3:52
3. "One Last Round" – 3:13
4. "Ghost of a Chance" – 3:40
5. "Thoughts and Prayers" – 2:55
6. "Brandy Alexander" (Sexsmith, Leslie Feist) – 3:29
7. "Traveling Alone" – 3:47
8. "Poor Helpless Dreams" – 3:53
9. "Hard Time" – 3:13
10. "The Impossible World" – 2:52
11. "Chased by Love" – 3:40
12. "Brighter Still" – 3:01
13. "Music to My Ears" – 3:43
14. "Dawn Anna" (instrumental) – 2:15

Japanese bonus tracks

15. "Here Comes My Baby"
16. "Rain on the Roof"
17. "Too Good to Be True"
18. "Comrades Fill No Glass for Me"
19. "Seems to Me" (also an iTunes bonus track)

== Personnel ==
- Ron Sexsmith – vocals, guitar, piano
- Neil Primrose – drums
- Sven Lindvall – bass (except tracks 1,2,12 and 14)
- Martin Terefe – electric guitar, bass (tracks 1 and 2), piano (track 12)
- Claes Björklund – keyboards, omnichord, piano (tracks 6 and 9)
- Emilio Del Monte Sr. – timbales and other percussion
- Emilio Del Monte Jr. – congas and other percussion
- Joaquin Betancourt – horns arrangement
- Alexander Abreu – trumpet
- Amaury Perez – trombone
- Jose Luis "Chewy" Hernandez – saxophone
- David Davidson – strings arrangement on "Dawn Anna", violin
- David Angell – violin
- Kris Wilkinson – viola
- John Catchings – cello
- Alexis Puentes – upright bass (track 12), nylon string guitar (track 11)
- Jamie Scott – cuatro (tracks 6,8 and 11), additional electric guitar (tracks 9 and 10)
- Kevin Hearn – piano (track 10), wurlitzer (track 2)
- A Girl Called Eddy – backing vocals (track 6)
- Colleen Hixenbaugh – backing vocals (track 7)
- Recorded by Dyre Gormsen
- Mixed by George Tandero, Martin Terefe and Thomas Juth
