= Christgau's Consumer Guide: Albums of the '90s =

2000 book by music journalist Robert Christgau

- Author: Robert Christgau
- Language: English
- Subject: Albums; capsule review; discography; music journalism; popular music
- Published: 2000 by St. Martin's Griffin
- Publication place: United States
- Media type: Print
- Pages: 396
- ISBN: 0-312-24560-2
- Preceded by: Christgau's Record Guide: The '80s

Christgau's Consumer Guide: Albums of the '90s is a music reference book by American music journalist and essayist Robert Christgau. It was published in October 2000 by St. Martin's Press's Griffin imprint and collects approximately 3,800 capsule album reviews, originally written by Christgau during the 1990s for his "Consumer Guide" column in The Village Voice. Text from his other writings for the Voice, Rolling Stone, Spin, and Playboy from this period is also featured. The book is the third in a series of influential "Consumer Guide" collections, following Christgau's Record Guide: Rock Albums of the Seventies (1981) and Christgau's Record Guide: The '80s (1990).

Covering a variety of genres within and beyond the conventional pop/rock axis of most music press, the reviews are composed in a concentrated, fragmented prose style characterized by layered clauses, caustic wit, one-liner jokes, political digressions, and allusions ranging from common knowledge to the esoteric. Adhering to Christgau's mainstream tastes and some personal eccentricities, the guide favors music on standards of catchiness, rhythmic vitality, and practical significance, while generally penalizing qualities like sexist content and hour-plus album lengths. It also introduces a new grading system Christgau developed in response to the proliferation in music production over the 1990s, an event he cites as a reason why this project was the most difficult of the three "Consumer Guide" collections.

Critical response to the guide was divided, with praise given to the quality of writing and breadth of coverage but disapproval of the novel rating schema and aspects of Christgau's judgements. The collection has since been referenced by both academic and journalistic works, with commentary noting its anticipation of increased fragmentation in popular music. Along with Christgau's other writings, its contents are freely available on his website – robertchristgau.com – created with fellow critic and web designer Tom Hull, who also adopted the book's grading system for his own review website.

== Background ==
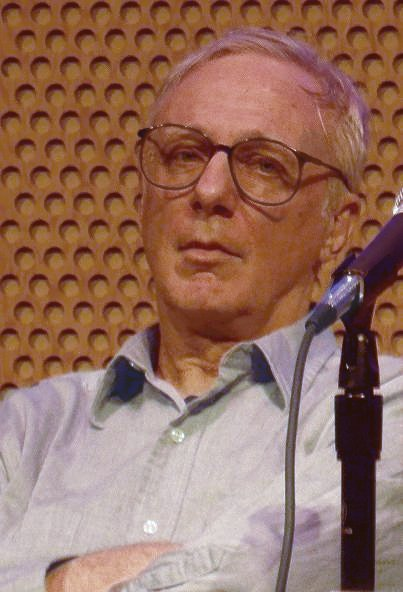
Robert Christgau at the 2006 Pop Conference

Christgau's Consumer Guide: Albums of the 90s is the third in a series of works collecting and editing Robert Christgau's album reviews, most of which were written for and published in his monthly "Consumer Guide" column in The Village Voice. The first two books in the series, Christgau's Record Guide: Rock Albums of the Seventies (1981) and Christgau's Record Guide: The '80s (1990), had influenced young music critics after their publication. He has said that the 1990s guide, collecting reviews written between 1990 and 2000, was "in many ways" the hardest to develop because of the decade's proliferation in music production and the growth of the record industry's market – he estimated approximately 35,000 albums were released each year worldwide.

As the music industry and record production expanded through the end of the 1980s, Christgau found himself overwhelmed by records to listen to and review for his "Consumer Guide" column. In September 1990, he abandoned his original letter-grading scheme on a scale of A-plus to E-minus, as B-plus records had become the most commonly reviewed works while albums rarely received grades lower than C-minus in the column. Instead, he decided to focus on writing reviews for albums he deemed worthy of A-minus to A-plus grades, with A-minus becoming the most common due in part to his sense of grade inflation, while works that would have ranged from B-minus to C-plus were largely ignored. This change was made because, as Christgau later said, "most of my readers – not critics and bizzers, but real-life consumers – used my primary critical outlet for its putative purpose. They wanted to know what to buy."

In this new format, records that Christgau deemed B-pluses were only reviewed occasionally and most were filed under an "Honorable Mention" section, featuring one short phrasal statement for each album alongside its recommended tracks. Records he considered poor were relegated to a list of ungraded "Duds" or featured in a special Thanksgiving Day column dedicated to negative reviews (titled "Turkey Shoot"), with the highest possible grade a B-minus. Under the new format, Christgau was also able to dedicate longer prose to graded reviews in the "Consumer Guide".

Christgau refined his new format further as the 1990s progressed, anticipating the decade's rapid increase in music recording and the diversification of the CD into archival releases and longer album lengths – from the traditional 40-minute average to upwards of 60 minutes. In 1992, he started a "Neither" (or "neither here nor there") category denoting albums unworthy of an "honorable mention" but better than "duds". The following year, an argument with fellow critic Eric Weisbard persuaded Christgau to review in each column a "Dud of the Month", which, in comparison to "Turkey Shoot", highlighted "a fair number of dull, disappointing, or overhyped B's".

== Content and scope ==
Christgau's Consumer Guide: Albums of the '90s collects approximately 3,800 album reviews. In preparing the original reviews for publication in book form, Christgau revisited many albums and made some grade changes, later citing the tendency of cultural items to "fade". For certain album entries, he also incorporated text from his other 1990s writings for the Voice, Rolling Stone, Spin, and Playboy.

The book's body of reviews covers a range of musical styles within and beyond the traditional rock/pop focus of the music press, including alternative rock, grunge, hip hop, techno, electronic, mainstream and alternative country, jazz, reggae, Afropop, worldbeat, Latin, dance, and boy band music. Christgau, whose past critical work had a strong focus on rock music, said by the time of this book his enthusiasm for the genre had become less exclusive yet still just as capable of exciting him as before.

Of the guide's aim, Christgau writes in the introduction that he intends to cover albums deemed worthwhile rather than a comprehensive discography. Having many years ago lost interest in trying to listen to every record made, he adds that the amount of recorded music produced each year is greater than the time it would take to play in succession, making it impossible to fulfill the ambition of his original 1970s "Consumer Guide" collection. In spite of this, Christgau says "the value of a shared culture" helps realize the concept for this book: "It's a real opening experience, being forced to hear genres that warrant public attention, even if we're not attracted to them."

According to journalist Scott Manzler, in the guide Christgau functions not as a completist but as a "generalist" who "tends to favor breadth over depth" of musical discovery and strives to "sample and process as much 'good music' as possible" from a decade which saw an "exponential surge in product ... in the wake of digital revolution and cultural fragmentation". In the introduction, Christgau states, "the book's subject should be your albums rather than my opinions", which journalist Joshua Klein calls a "snarky" claim to "populist objectivity".

The guide also has extensive entries on many of the 1990s' most influential acts, such as Nirvana, Public Enemy, Sonic Youth, Sleater-Kinney, and Pavement. Reissues of older recordings are also highlighted, including the guitar-centric benga music compilation Guitar Paradise of East Africa (1990), the 1991 Memphis blues compilation Wild About My Lovin': Beale Street Blues 1928-1930, the 1997 CD edition of Harry Everett Smith's Anthology of American Folk Music, and ESPN Presents Slam Jams Vol. 1 (1997), which repackages pop hits such as "One Step Beyond" (1979) by Madness and "Dancing with Myself" (1981) by Billy Idol.

=== Sensibility ===
Well, you know ... fuck those people. Well, I think they're already fucked – you don't need to fuck them. There's no point arguing with a puritan. They're just going to think you're a sinner and consign you to hell. It's one of the tendencies I've been fighting for my entire life. I hate it in literature, and I hate it in music. But it's especially vile in music, because it's so clear that music's human function, whatever exactly that is – and nobody understands what it is – has something to do with pleasure. And what a lot of these people don't admit, in fact, is that they're just perverts. And they get their pleasure from pain.

— Christgau in 2000, questioned about people who dislike pop songs for being gratifying

In regards to critical sensibilities, Christgau says he has mainstream pop tastes and a fondness for "stupid, catchy songs with a lot of energy and life to them". (Note: While not released in the 1990s, "Who Let the Dogs Out?" (2000) by the Baha Men is cited by Christgau as an example: "That song is good. People complain about songs like that, but what do they know? Don't they have any sense of fun? What's wrong with them?") Pick identifies "the pleasure principle" as a unifying theme throughout the critic's appraisals in the book, along with concepts of groove and practical significance. Generally speaking, he "tends to enjoy music that weds rhythmic vitality with catchy presentation while saying something original and worthwhile", Pick says. Mark Jenkins, meanwhile, describes "the Christgauian view of pop critics" as having "an obligation to take seriously stuff that sells – to deal with the marketplace, pop's only quantifiable consensus", which Jenkins qualifies is typically not the domain of serious music writers.

The book's section of A-lists ranks releases from each year that are graded "A-minus" or higher. At the top of these lists are albums that Christgau says will ultimately determine a listener's agreement with his sensibilities and, by extension, whether or not the book will be useful to them. His most essential albums from the 1990s, as mentioned in the guide, include Fear of a Black Planet (1990) by Public Enemy, Nevermind (1991) by Nirvana, Maxinquaye (1995) by Tricky, The Score (1996) by Fugees, and Car Wheels on a Gravel Road (1998) by Lucinda Williams. (Note: Jamie Allen of CNN contextualizes Christgau's tastes by quoting his reviews for two of the albums: "This", he writes of Nevermind, "is hard rock as the term was understood before metal moved in – the kind of loud, slovenly, tuneful music you think no one will ever work a change on again until the next time it happens, whereupon you wonder why there isn't loads more. It seems so simple." Of The Score, he writes, "It's so beautiful and funny its courage could make you weep." Years later, when asked about compiling a list of his 10 best albums from the 1990s, Christgau also considered Mama Said Knock You Out (1990) by LL Cool J, Exile in Guyville (1993) by Liz Phair, Latin Playboys' self-titled album (1994), Diary of a Mod Housewife (1996) by Amy Rigby, Endtroducing..... (1996) by DJ Shadow, Mundo Civilizado (1997) by Arto Lindsay, The Slim Shady LP (1999) by Eminem, the Tom Zé compilation Brazil Classics, Vol. 4 (1990), the Go-Betweens compilation 1978–1990 (1990), the James Brown compilation Star Time (1991), and the African music compilations Guitar Paradise of East Africa (1990) and The Music in My Head (1998).)

Among Christgau's subjects of complaint is the kind of violent and thoughtless sexism he says had been popularized by heavy metal and hip hop. He finds panning such content on "its own terms" easy and enjoyable, particularly "as a foul-mouthed person who's still very deeply interested in sex at age fifty-eight", as he told Rolling Stone in 2001. In regards to sexism in rap, he refutes the commonly held notion among African-American critics that "young black men should have absolute carte blanche to say what they want" because they are "thoroughly fucked over" by a racist society. However, he admits there are rappers who employ sexist content in an artful way that offers insight into its pathology, citing Eminem and Ghostface Killah as examples. (Note: Speaking with Rolling Stone in 2001, Christgau cites Ghostface Killah's "Wildflower" (1996) as "one of the vilest pieces of anti-women spew you'll ever hear", but "also truly great ... this incredibly violent tirade that which really enacts something about jealousy and sexual rage." He additionally cites Eminem's 2000 album The Marshall Mathers LP, specifically "Kim", and regards the claim that the song endorses murdering unfaithful wives as "a disgusting absurdity" by people less intelligent than the rapper.) He has also expressed discomfort with album lengths much longer than the 40-minute standard of past decades, analogizing it to the rarity of a symphony to surpass the same length of time, which he says gives insight into the average person's attention span: "And of course the symphony is a nineteenth century form when people had more time. So I think there's something really weird about the seventy-eight-minute album."

Overall, these sensibilities sometimes lend the book a contrarian attitude. For instance, favorable reviews are given to critically neglected albums by the likes of Collective Soul, His Name Is Alive, the Bottle Rockets, Shania Twain, Garth Brooks, the Backstreet Boys, P.M. Dawn, Kris Kross, and a variety of African musicians, while many conventionally acclaimed releases are appraised negatively, including those by Radiohead, the Flaming Lips, Elvis Costello, Dr. Dre, Snoop Dogg, Nas, Marilyn Manson, Son Volt, and Emmylou Harris. Christgau says, however, that he usually dislikes writing negative reviews as it requires him to get in a "bad mood" in order to write engagingly and vividly about an album that fails his personal standards. (Note: "It's definitely the hardest part of my year", Christgau told CNN in 2000 in regards to his annual November "Turkey Shoot". "It's not a pleasant place to be, psychologically. I become testier.")

=== Writing style ===
The collected reviews are composed in a concentrated, capsule-style prose averaging 100 to 150 words each. Christgau's sentences tend to be lengthy and complex, packed with clauses and allusions ranging from common knowledge to the esoteric, alongside both straightforward and inside jokes. As Riverfront Times journalist Steve Pick comments, a single review can encompass as many concepts and ideas as another journalist's feature story. When interviewed by Pick about the book in 2000, Christgau explained that he developed an "inner imperative about waste" at age 21 when working his first professional writing job at a substandard encyclopedia producer in Chicago: "I had to write the article on Isaac Babel in 10 lines and the article on baseball in 221 lines. It really instilled habits of compression in me that I've never lost."

[Chan Marshall]'s an honest heroine of the new indie staple – not noise-tune and certainly not irony, both as passé as the guilty pop dreams they kept at bay, but sadness. Slow sadness. Slow sadness about one's inability to relate. And not to audiences. Hell is other people.

— excerpt from Robert Christgau's "Consumer Guide" review of Cat Power's Moon Pix (1998)

The critiques are also colored with witticisms and derisive remarks, often rendered in fragmented form – Christgau said at the time that "my writing is getting more and more haiku-like". As an example, Klein cites Christgau's description of musician Lou Barlow as a "retard" while reviewing The Folk Implosion's 1999 album One Part Lullaby, and his single-sentence review of the 1998 Gomez album Bring It On, in which he writes, "Really da roots-rock – they mean it, man."

Noel Murray regards the writing as veering from "incisively personal" to dense in the manner of prose poetry, while Rick Anderson observes "biting one-liners, obscure references and unapologetically political asides". As examples of these qualities, Murray refers to Christgau's reviews of Cat Power's Moon Pix (1998) and the 1993 Counting Crows album August and Everything After, in the latter of which the critic writes that the band's frontman Adam Duritz "sings like the dutiful son of permissive parents I hope don't sit next to me at Woodstock"."

=== Grading key ===
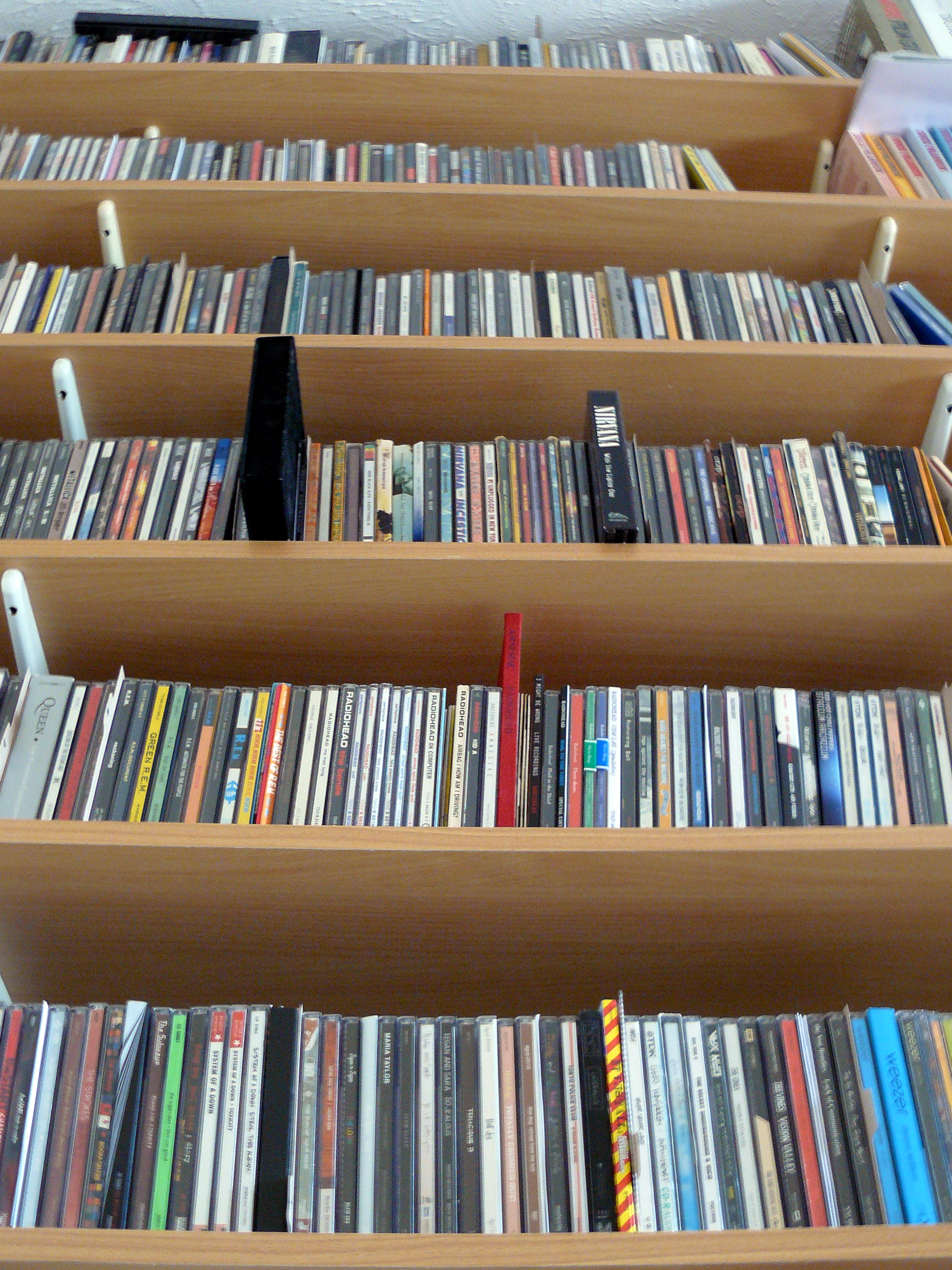
A CD collection pictured in 2007; the proliferation of music production in the format informed Christgau's reviewing and grading standards throughout the preceding decade.

The introductory pages to the book list each grade with the following explanatory notes:

- A-plus: "a record of sustained beauty, power, insight, groove, and/or googlefritz that has invited and repaid repeated listenings in the daily life of someone with 500 other CDs to get to."
- A: "a record that rarely flags for more than two or three tracks. Not every listener will feel what it's trying to do, but anyone with ears will agree that it's doing it."
- A-minus: "the kind of garden-variety good record that is the great luxury of musical micromarketing and overproduction. Anyone open to its aesthetic will enjoy more than half its tracks."
- B-plus: "remarkable one way or another, yet also flirts with the humdrum or the half-assed."
- Honorable Mention: "an enjoyable effort consumers attuned to its overriding aesthetic or individual vision may well treasure."
- Honorable Mention: "an [sic] likable effort consumers attuned to its overriding aesthetic or individual vision may well enjoy."
- Honorable Mention: "a worthy effort consumers attuned to its overriding aesthetic or individual vision may well like." (Note: According to Murray, the mention is for adequate albums featuring more than a couple of decent tracks. Christgau later clarified that the three- and two-star honorable mentions "are B pluses I adjudge unworthy of a full review; so are most of the [one-star]'s, but I leave myself hedge room at the very bottom when there's something I feel the need to weigh in on briefly.")
- Neither: "may impress once or twice with consistent craft or an arresting track or two. Then it won't." (Note: When the "Neither" entries were later republished on Christgau's website, they were indicated by a cartoon impassive face. Klein describes the rating as evoking "a vague sense of indifference", while Murray says it is reserved "for a record that may be better than Christgau thinks it is, but that he doesn't have the inclination to sort out".)
- Choice Cut (indicated by a cartoon meat slice): "a good song on an album that isn't worth your time or money – sometimes a Neither, more often a Dud." (Note: The "choice cut" entries are indicated by cartoon scissors on Christgau's website.)
- Dud: "a bad record whose details rarely merit further thought. At the upper level it may merely be overrated, disappointing, or dull. Down below it may be contemptible."
- Turkey (indicated by a cartoon turkey): "a bad record of some general import", distinguished from a "dud" by a review and accompanying letter grade generally from B to D. (Note: According to Murray, the rating is meant "to indicate a well-received record that [Christgau] thinks is overrated", while Klein opines that it is "generally affixed to albums everyone likes but him", such as the 1991 U2 album Achtung Baby; Manzler identifies another example in Radiohead's OK Computer (1997). In the book, Christgau advises consumers to regard anything graded B and lower as a failure.)

== Publication and reception ==
In August 2000, Christgau's Consumer Guide: Albums of the '90s appeared in the Publishers Weekly "Fall 2000 Paperback Trade List" of upcoming publications. St. Martin's Press released the book afterwards in October under the publisher's Griffin imprint. Reviewing for No Depression magazine that month, Manzler applauded Christgau's aim for "an opinionated, expansive survey" of the past decade's music, albeit at the expense of total consistency and grace in coverage. Overall, he found the guide highly valuable for readers expecting "a highly partisan, highly committed overview, a tour guide if you will, of the sprawlingly unkempt, often dizzying but nonetheless fun-packed rock landscape". Appraising the merits of Christgau's "densely packed, deeply textured" writing, Manzler respected the uniqueness of his "aesthetic, winnowed and refined over three decades of music processing" and which, at its best, "ring[s] in the mind's ear like catchy three-minute pop confections". He believed that some readers may find him "willfully obscure (if not opaque)" but only as a consequence of the critic demanding a certain level of competence from both them and recording artists. In a profile on the book in December, Christgau said he believes his readership is "very high-quality" and trusts his approach to criticism:

I think my own audience tends to be pretty literate and inquisitive, and they tend to be able to tolerate a certain amount of cognitive dissonance, which is exactly what I ask of listeners when I recommend records. In other words, they don't expect to understand every single fucking word I say and are even willing to look at things twice sometimes, just as you ought to be willing to listen to things twice sometimes.

Writing for The Guardian in May 2001, author and journalist Garth Cartwright declared Christgau is still attuned to popular tastes and said his prose – "acerbic, informative, funny, lyrical and perfect for arguing with" – demonstrates a dynamism and energy that is rare in the current ethos of music journalism, where the value of writing has diminished. Considering the 1990s "Consumer Guide" collection alongside its preceding volumes on the 1970s and 1980s, Cartwright said "they're a comprehensive overview of musical activity across the past 30 years, effortlessly surfing the high ways and cul-de-sacs of popular culture." Anderson, in Reno News & Review, found the guide very amusing and "more entertaining than useful, but even when you're not exactly sure what he's getting at, you'll enjoy the struggle."

Other reviewers were less receptive to the guide. Murray, writing in Nashville Scene, tried to understand the new rating system as a method of "cherry-picking the ripest fruit on a dying tree" that is "the album as an art form", which he acknowledged has been "debased" by the CD era. However, he said the concept is of little value in practice, depriving readers of context behind dismissals of many highly regarded albums and essentially wasting their time. His review also highlighted Christgau's commendable disapproval but inconsistent coverage of "intentionally sloppy and/or overly pensive indie rock", alongside a "deferential stance" toward more exotic styles the critic is less knowledgeable about. Despite "moments of stunning clarity", Murray concluded that the guide lacks the relevancy of its previous volumes and that the critic's writing would benefit from a stronger focus on music of specialized interest to him: "In these cluttered times, we need someone to sort through the pile, not embrace it." Similarly, Jenkins in the Washington City Paper faulted Christgau for largely overlooking the decade's notable music developments, including electronica, non-African world music, indie rock outside of the critic's native New York, and UK bands that did not impact the US, among them Stereophonics and Manic Street Preachers. For Jenkins, the book was ultimately a "respectable failure" proving "'90s pop music was too sprawling for one person – or one aesthetic – to encompass".

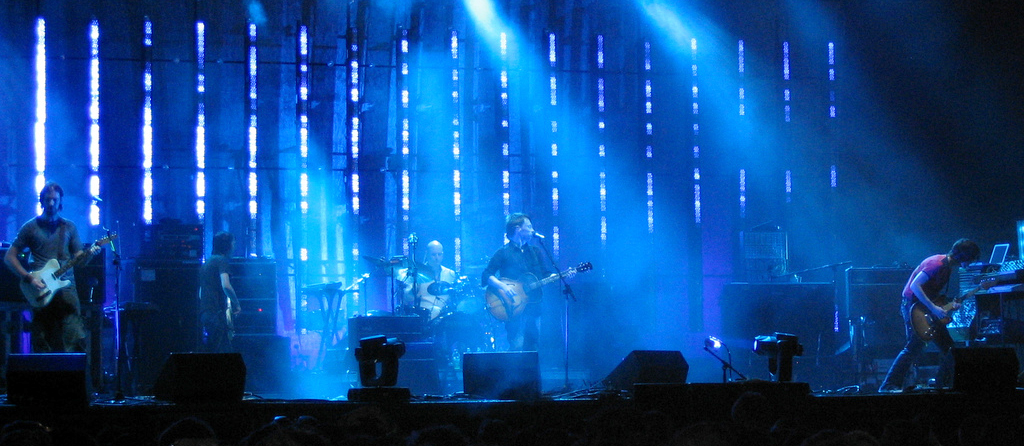
Christgau's tepid response to English rock band Radiohead (pictured in 2004) was a source of controversy.

For The A.V. Club, in March 2002, Klein panned Christgau's Consumer Guide: Albums of the '90s as significantly inferior to its predecessors, particularly because of the complicated ratings it implements alongside traditional letter grades, "an error in judgement that robs the book of any sense of scale, context, or comprehension". He was also critical of Christgau's mainstream tastes and charged him with self-centered writing, baseless dismissal of major critical hits, and annoying attempts at humor, all of which Klein said lend the guide inconsistency. "As a time capsule of one man's eccentricities and unpredictable tastes, it's a perplexing diversion", he wrote, "but as a reference book of any practical value, it's a mess, like a 400-page index with no content."

Several reviewers and writers profiling Christgau for the book referenced his controversially unenthusiastic appraisal of Radiohead, whose albums The Bends (1995) and OK Computer (1997) had been highly successful with critics but only garnered "Turkey" ratings in his "Consumer Guide" reviews. When interviewed by CNN senior writer Jamie Allen in November 2000, the critic said laughingly, "I dislike Radiohead quite a bit. It's art rock. It's stupid. And I will be vindicated." However, he later told Rolling Stone in February 2001 he rated Kid A (2000) favorably with an "A-minus" after its performance on the annual Pazz & Jop critics poll – which Christgau supervised – encouraged him to revisit it in his column. (Note: Before the interview was published, Christgau had explained to the magazine that the adulation given to artists like Radiohead and Dr. Dre by listeners under the age of 30 is evidence of his relative disconnection from fashionable opinions. He went on to say Radiohead is the only act that approaches this generation's desire for a "heroic band", explaining that they have "a futurism about them that makes people think that they portend something, which, God help us, they probably do.")

=== Legacy ===
The contents of Christgau's Consumer Guide: Albums of the '90s, along with the critic's other writings, were made freely available on his website – robertchristgau.com – after it went online in 2001. The site was created as a collaborative project with long-time friend and former colleague Tom Hull, who started as a Voice critic in 1975 under Christgau's mentorship, served as a resource for his 1980s "Consumer Guide" collection, and worked in software engineering and design, which lent him the expertise to create the website in a functional, low-graphic design favoring text over media. Hull also created his own online database and blog, Tom Hull – On the Web, in a similar fashion, featuring his past and contemporaneous writings, and a catalog of primarily jazz-based records and reviews that adopt the grading schema from this book. (Note: Christgau, who finds it personally difficult to review jazz in his own writing aesthetic, has recommended Hull's website for readers seeking advice on jazz albums.)

Christgau's Consumer Guide: Albums of the '90s has been used as a reference in several scholarly works on music and culture. In an essay published in Ulrich Beck's Global America?: The Cultural Consequences of Globalization (2004), sociologist Motti Regev says the collection demonstrates how the canonizing of rock music in the 1960s and 1970s among professional critics had created a status structure and orthodoxy that carried over into other developments in popular music through the next century. (Note: Regev elaborates on this aspect in "'Rockization': Diversity within Similarity in World Popular Music" (2004): "The artistic and cultural status of rock pushed other actors in contemporary popular music to adopt the stylistic and sonic innovations explored by rock musicians and turn them into the conventional way of making music. In other words, the canonization of rock triggered the emergence of (in Bourdieu's terminology) an artistic field of popular music structured around a hierarchy of prestige. In this field, the dominant positions are occupied by the already canonized 'avant-garde' of earlier periods and by the upcoming styles and musicians hailed as the new 'avant-garde' by power-holding critics and reviewers in the field.")

In 2006, all three "Consumer Guide" collections were collectively ranked fifth on The A.V. Club's list of the 17 most essential popular music books. A brief essay accompanying the ranking advised that "these books should be read as a trilogy, with special attention paid to the way the last decade's increasingly fragmented pop landscape and flood of DIY releases has caused even The Dean to sputter a little." In a 2009 retrospective piece for the Houston Chronicle, Andrew Dansby said the assessment Christgau had made in the introduction to the 1990s guide – that "popular music in the year 2000 is a democratic cornucopia" and "there's just too much out there" for any single artist to have a far-reaching cultural relevance and impact – foreshadowed the music landscape of the decade that ensued. (Note: Dansby refers to the following portion of Christgau's introduction in Christgau's Consumer Guide: Albums of the '90s (2000): "The standard whine among my contemporaries concerns what I long ago dubbed The Mattering. Music doesn't 'make a difference' anymore, 'tis said. Once we thought it would change the world; now we're lucky if it can change its socks. Who can possibly believe that Madonna and the Wu-Tang Clan mean as much to the Culture at Large as the Beatles and Aretha Franklin? These objections obviously reflect the strictly subjective reality of listeners who've heard far more music now than they had in 1969 – listeners whose lives have accrued so much experiential bulk that nothing budges them much anymore." Dansby interprets "the Mattering" as "a not-entirely-quantifiable marriage of influence and popularity" that in the 1960s and 1970s reflected a predominantly white culture and catered to a similarly limited range of consumers and media outlets. He adds that, while many major pop artists emerged during the 2000s, "these years seemed void of acts that mattered in the traditional rock-centric sense; its icons – iTunes and MySpace – were primarily technological. Even the questionable '90s – which stripped the soul from R&B and birthed loathsome mook rock – produced Nirvana, maybe the last old-school Mattering band with zeitgeist.")

== See also ==
- Album era
- 1990s in music
- Rockism and poptimism
- Spin Alternative Record Guide
