= Mel Parsons =

New Zealand singer-songwriter (born 1981)

- Born: Mel Parsons; 21 October 1981 (age 45); Westport, New Zealand
- Genres: Indie folk, alternative country
- Occupations: Singer-songwriter, guitarist
- Instruments: Guitar, vocals
- Years active: 2007–present
- Label: Cape Road Recordings
- Website: melparsons.com

Mel Parsons (born 21 October 1981) is an indie folk and alternative country singer/songwriter from New Zealand.

== Early life and education ==
Parsons grew up on a sheep and beef farm in Cape Foulwind, near Westport, on the West Coast of New Zealand's South Island. Parsons started out playing piano, and also picked up the guitar at about 14, finally getting serious in seventh form (about age 17) when applying for the Nelson School of Music. After a year of music school, Parsons went overseas for a period, then returned to New Zealand to attend the University of Auckland, where she studied popular music and performance, along with history, anthropology and Spanish.

Parsons has lived in various parts of the world. She spent a year close to the Atacama Desert in Chile, and two years in the Rocky Mountains in Canada.

Early influences on Parsons were Cat Stevens, Paul Simon, Mark Knopfler, The Police, Sinéad O'Connor, Bob Dylan, Tom Petty, Neil Young and Neil Diamond. Later influences were Tracy Chapman, Ray LaMontagne, Damien Rice, Gillian Welch, Ron Sexsmith, and The Shins.

== Career ==
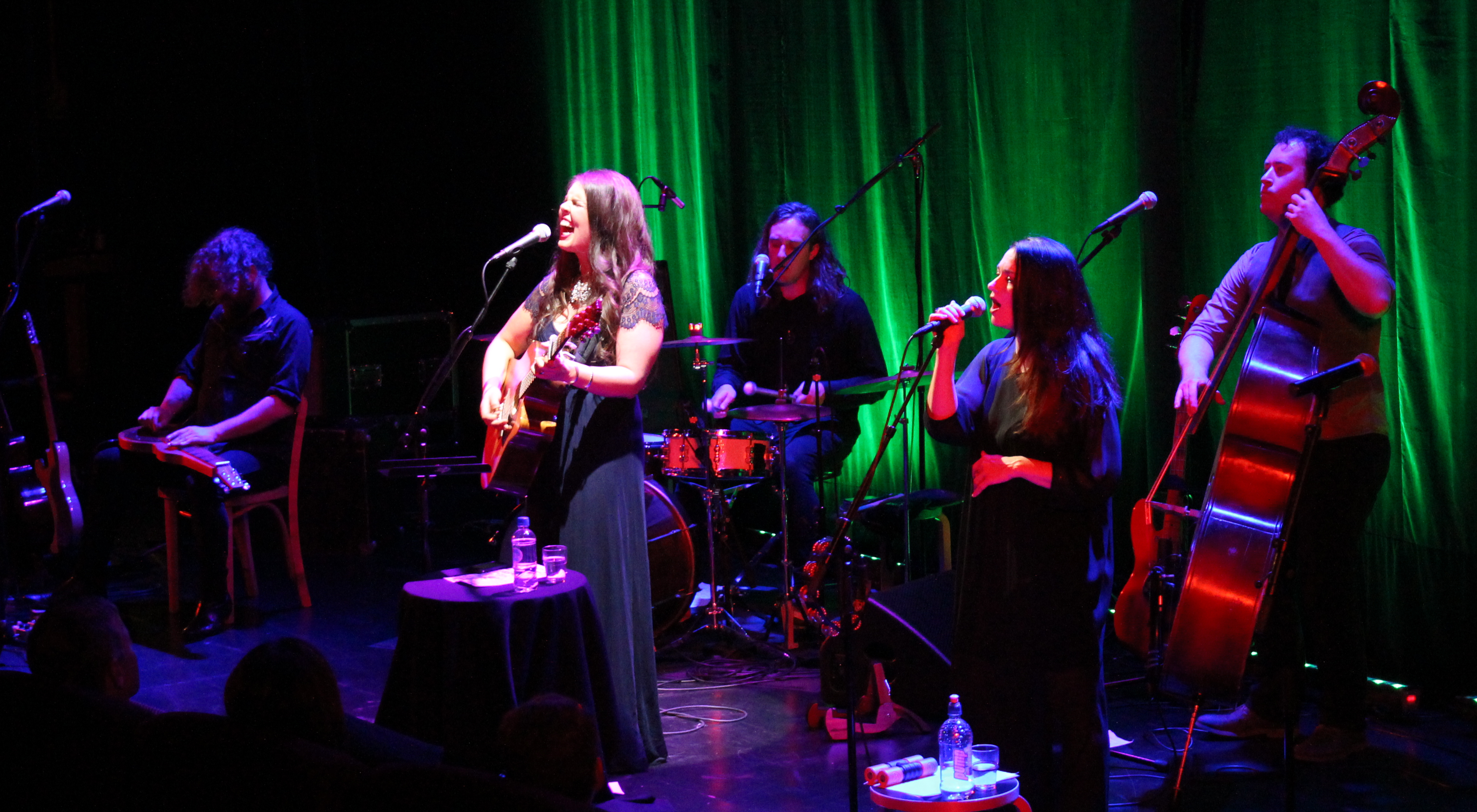
Gerry Paul, Mel Parsons, Jed Parsons, Julia Deans, Aaron Stewart; Mel Parsons at Paramount Theatre, Wellington 2015

In 2007, Parsons returned to New Zealand to start work on her first album. The album was written by Parsons, and recorded with co-producer Shaun Elley and her backing band, The Rhythm Kings. The album Over My Shoulder was released in 2009. Parsons created her own label, Cape Road Recordings, releasing her album independently while using the New Zealand music firm Border Music for distribution. All of her albums have been released on her label.

In 2011, Parsons released her second studio album, Red Grey Blue, featuring Anika Moa and Greg Johnson on harmonies, Bruce Lynch on double bass, and Don McGlashan on baritone horn, along with others. The album was recorded in Studio One, Boatshed Studios, and The Spare Room, in Auckland, New Zealand.

Parsons recorded her third studio album, Drylands at Surgery Studios. The album was engineered by Lee Prebble who, along with mixing engineer Oliver Harmer, won the 2015 New Zealand Music Awards for best engineer for the album. One of the songs Parsons wrote was a duet, and she decided to cold e-mail Ron Sexsmith to see if he would perform the other half of the song "Don't Wait", and he agreed. Another song on the album, "Get Out Alive", is the result of her writing about a dangerous car accident she was in where the car rolled four times and was totaled, but she walked out without serious injury, but found herself re-evaluating her life for a time.

Parsons released her fourth album, Glass Heart on 30 November 2018. Glass Heart is the first album Parsons recorded outside of New Zealand. It was recorded in the US in Santa Monica, California, with producer Mitchell Froom. The logistics and finances made it impractical to bring her backing band over from New Zealand, so Froom recruited some local musicians to back Parsons on the album. The backing band for the album consists of bass player Kaveh Rastegar, guitarist Adam Levy, and drummer Ted Poor.

Parsons performs rural woolshed tours across New Zealand with Amelia Dunbar and Emma Newborn (The Bitches Box). Although she sometimes tours by herself, and sometimes with her backing band, she has also joined a large New Zealand performance collective, Fly My Pretties. She also has toured Australia with Anika Moa. Parsons was invited to perform at the Folk Alliance International in 2014, 2015 and 2017.

Parsons released her fifth studio album, Slow Burn, on 16 September 2022. It contains the singles "Carry On", "Already Gone", and the title track "Slow Burn". On 7 June 2024, she released her sixth studio album, Sabotage. It has reached no. 5 on the New Zealand music charts. On 7 August 2026, her seventh album, Castle Hill, was released, following seven singles from the album being released in 2025 and 2026.

== Personal life ==
Parsons currently lives in Lyttelton, New Zealand. She tours so frequently that she is rarely home.

== Recognition ==
Parsons was nominated for the following awards:

- Best Folk Album – 2009 New Zealand Music Awards.
- Best Folk Album – 2012 New Zealand Music Awards.
- Songwriter – 2015 APRA Silver Scroll Awards in New Zealand. She was one of five finalists, alongside others such as Lorde.

Parsons has won the following awards:

- Best Folk Artist - 2020 New Zealand Music Awards.
- Best Country Music Song – 2016 New Zealand Music Awards.
- Best Independent Tour – 2016 MMF Music Awards (Music Managers Awards, New Zealand).

== Discography ==
- Over My Shoulder (2009)
- Red Grey Blue (2011)
- Drylands (2015)
- Glass Heart (2018)
- Slow Burn (2022)
- Sabotage (2024)
- Castle Hill (2026)
