= Blue Boy (album) =

Studio album by Ron Sexsmith
- Released: June 5, 2001
- Recorded: Nashville, Tennessee
- Genre: Rock
- Label: spinART, Cooking Vinyl
- Producer: Steve Earle, Ray Kennedy

Ron Sexsmith chronology
Whereabouts (1999)	Blue Boy (2001)	Cobblestone Runway (2002)

Professional ratings
Review scores
Source	Rating
AllMusic	4/5 stars
The Encyclopedia of Popular Music	3/5 stars
Entertainment Weekly	A
The Guardian	2.5/5 stars
Rolling Stone	3.5/5 stars
Spin	8/10

Blue Boy is a studio album by Canadian singer-songwriter Ron Sexsmith, released in 2001. Sexsmith's former label, Interscope, refused to release the album; Sexsmith eventually was able to license and shop it.

== Production ==
The album was recorded in Nashville, over the course of six days, and was produced by Steve Earle and his partner Ray Kennedy. Earle encouraged Sexsmith to record the stylistically diverse songs that Sexsmith normally omitted from albums. It includes a cover of the Kyp Harness song "Thumbelina Farewell."

== Critical reception ==
No Depression wrote that Sexsmith "bonds his thoughtful, elegant wordplay, indelible sense of melody, and demure voice to a myriad of styles." The Washington Post wrote that the album is "shot through with crafty and engaging pop tunes that incorporate everything from backward loops and string arrangements to jazz coloring and reggae beats." Trouser Press wrote that the producers "picked up the tempo, pushed [Sexsmith] to sing more forcefully, got the Hammond organ Leslie cabinet twirling and plugged in the electric guitars — all of which moved Sexsmith to a safe and happy musical place that supports, rather than competes with, his songwriting."

== Track listing ==
All songs by Ronald Eldon Sexsmith except where noted.

1. "This Song" – 3:43
2. "Cheap Hotel" – 2:17
3. "Don't Ask Why" – 2:58
4. "Foolproof" – 3:45
5. "Tell Me Again" – 2:35
6. "Just My Heart Talkin'" – 2:21
7. "Not Too Big" – 3:20
8. "Miracle in Itself" – 2:47
9. "Thirsty Love" – 3:15
10. "Never Been Done" – 2:52
11. "Thumbelina Farewell" (Kyp Harness) – 4:14
12. "Parable" – 3:17
13. "Keep It in Mind" – 3:09
14. "Fallen" – 3:07
15. "Before We Ever Met" (Japanese Bonus Track)
