= Time Being (Ron Sexsmith album) =

Studio album by Ron Sexsmith
- Released: May 12, 2006
- Genre: Rock
- Label: V2 Records
- Producer: Mitchell Froom

Ron Sexsmith chronology
Destination Unknown (2005)	Time Being (2006)	Exit Strategy of the Soul (2008)

Professional ratings
Review scores
Source	Rating
AllMusic	3.5/5 stars

Time Being is the tenth studio album by Ron Sexsmith, released in 2006. It was produced by Mitchell Froom. The album debuted at #45 on the Canadian Albums Chart.

== Track listing ==
All songs written by Ronald Eldon Sexsmith.

1. "Hands of Time" – 3:16
2. "Snow Angel" – 3:54
3. "All in Good Time" – 3:35
4. "Never Give Up" – 3:41
5. "I Think We're Lost" – 2:57
6. "Reason for Our Love" – 3:10
7. "Cold Hearted Wind" – 3:40
8. "Jazz at the Bookstore" – 3:29
9. "Ship of Fools" – 3:10
10. "The Grim Trucker" – 2:59
11. "Some Dusty Things" – 2:38
12. "And Now the Day Is Done" – 4:21

Japanese bonus tracks

13. "Snow Angel" (live)
14. "And Now the Day Is Done" (live)
15. "Jazz at the Bookstore" (live)
16. "Ship of Fools" (live)
