= Other Songs (album) =

Studio album by Ron Sexsmith
- Released: June 17, 1997
- Studio: Magic Shop, New York City
- Genre: Rock
- Label: Interscope
- Producer: Tchad Blake; Mitchell Froom

Ron Sexsmith chronology
Ron Sexsmith (1995)	Other Songs (1997)	Whereabouts (1999)

Professional ratings
Review scores
Source	Rating
AllMusic	4/5 stars
Chicago Tribune	3/4 stars
Encyclopedia of Popular Music	3/5 stars
Entertainment Weekly	A
The Guardian	4/5 stars
Houston Chronicle	3/5 stars
Los Angeles Times	4/4 stars
NME	7/10
The Philadelphia Inquirer	3.5/4 stars
The Rolling Stone Album Guide	3/5 stars

Other Songs is the third album and second major-label album by Canadian singer-songwriter Ron Sexsmith, released on June 17, 1997 on Interscope Records. The album won the Juno Award for Roots & Traditional Album of the Year – Solo at the 1998 Juno Awards.

== Track listing ==
All tracks are written by Ronald Eldon Sexsmith.

No.	Title	Length
1.	"Thinking Out Loud"	2:32
2.	"Strawberry Blonde"	3:41
3.	"Average Joe"	2:17
4.	"Thinly Veiled Disguise"	3:29
5.	"Nothing Good"	2:54
6.	"Pretty Little Cemetery"	2:32
7.	"It Never Fails"	2:15
8.	"Clown in Broad Daylight"	2:25
9.	"At Different Times"	3:03
10.	"Child Star"	3:07
11.	"Honest Mistake"	2:29
12.	"So Young"	2:41
13.	"While You're Waiting"	3:27
14.	"April After All"	2:43

Japanese edition bonus track
No.	Title	Length
15.	"Same Old Eyes"	3:30
