= Long Player Late Bloomer =

Studio album by Ron Sexsmith
- Released: March 1, 2011
- Genre: Pop folk, rock
- Length: 43:40
- Label: Thirty Tigers
- Producer: Bob Rock

Ron Sexsmith chronology
| Exit Strategy of the Soul (2008) | Long Player Late Bloomer (2011) | Forever Endeavour (2013) |

Professional ratings
Aggregate scores
| Source | Rating |
|---|---|
| Metacritic | 70/100 |
Review scores
| Source | Rating |
| AllMusic | 4/5 stars |
| The Guardian | 4/5 stars |
| PopMatters | 6/10 stars |

Long Player Late Bloomer is the 12th studio album by Canadian singer-songwriter Ron Sexsmith, released in 2011.

On June 16, the album was named as a longlisted nominee (one of 40) for the 2011 Polaris Music Prize. On July 6, the album was named as a shortlisted (one of 10) nominee for the 2011 award. The album was subsequently nominated for Adult Alternative Album of the Year at the 2012 Juno Awards.

The album is notable for being produced by heavy metal producer Bob Rock, best known for his work with Mötley Crüe and Metallica. Sexsmith was followed by a camera crew for the recording of the album, which resulted in the film, Love Shines which documents Sexsmith's attempts to turn his niche following into mainstream success by recording the album with Rock. Long Player Late Bloomer spent a total of three weeks in the UK official album chart, peaking at no. 48

== Track listing ==
All tracks written by Ron Sexsmith

1. "Get in Line" – 2:27
2. "The Reason Why" – 3:14
3. "Believe It When I See It" – 3:45
4. "Miracles" – 2:31
5. "No Help at All" – 3:30
6. "Late Bloomer" – 4:08
7. "Heavenly" – 2:32
8. "Michael and His Dad" – 3:50
9. "Middle of Love" – 3:05
10. "Every Time I Follow" – 3:24
11. "Eye Candy" – 3:45
12. "Love Shines" – 4:29
13. "Nowadays" – 3:00

Japanese bonus tracks

14. "Wooden Toys"
15. "Chambermaid"
16. "Next Time"
17. "Speaking with the Angel" (acoustic)
18. "Love Shines" (acoustic)
