= Latin Playboys =

American experimental rock band

- Origin: East Los Angeles, California, U.S.
- Genres: Experimental rock; Latin rock; indie rock; Latin alternative
- Years active: 1994–1999
- Labels: Slash, Warner Bros., Atlantic
- Past members: David Hidalgo; Louie Pérez; Mitchell Froom; Tchad Blake

Latin Playboys was an American experimental rock band formed by David Hidalgo, Louie Pérez, Mitchell Froom and Tchad Blake, active in the 1990s.

== History ==
The band began with a series of demo recordings made by Hidalgo on a home cassette tape four-track machine. The demos were intended for Hidalgo's main group, Los Lobos, but producer/keyboardist Mitchell Froom thought the demos were interesting enough on their own to justify a new side-project. With Los Lobos member Louie Pérez, and Froom's frequent production partner Tchad Blake, Latin Playboys was officially formed.

The group released two albums, Latin Playboys, in 1994, and Dose, in 1999. The songs "Manifold de Amour" and "Forever Night Shade Mary," both from the 1994 self-titled debut album, are featured on the soundtrack album for the 1995 film Desperado.

In 1999 the band performed in Toronto at Lee's Palace.

Critic Richie Unterberger described their music as "a twisted and avant-garde take on roots music."

An acoustic version of "Crayon Sun" was recorded by Pérez and Hidalgo for the 2020 Netflix documentary The Trials of Gabriel Fernandez.

== Discography ==
=== Latin Playboys (Self Titled), 1994 ===
Track listing

1. "Viva la raza" 2:48
2. "Ten Believers" 3:17
3. "Chinese Surprize" 3:07
4. "Mira!" 1:25
5. "Manifold de Amour" 2:02
6. "New Zandu" 3:13
7. "Rudy's Party" 2:31
8. "If" 1:41
9. "Same Brown Earth" 3:45
10. "Lagoon" 2:28
11. "Gone" 2:52
12. "Crayon Sun" 3:09
13. "Pink Steps" 2:06
14. "Forever Night Shade Mary" 3:04

=== Dose, 1999 ===
Track listing

1. "Fiesta Erotica" 3:09
2. "Cuca's Blues" 3:14
3. "Ironsides" 1:46
4. "Mustard" 3:28
5. "Nubian Priestess" 1:59
6. "Dose" 2:33
7. "Latin Trip" 2:58
8. "Tormenta Blvd." 2:08
9. "Lemon 'n Ice" 3:50
10. "Locoman" (LP version) 2:48
11. "Toro" (LP version) 0:38
12. "Paletero" (LP version) 3:13
13. "Paula y Fred" (LP version) 3:06
