= The Ditty Bops =

American band

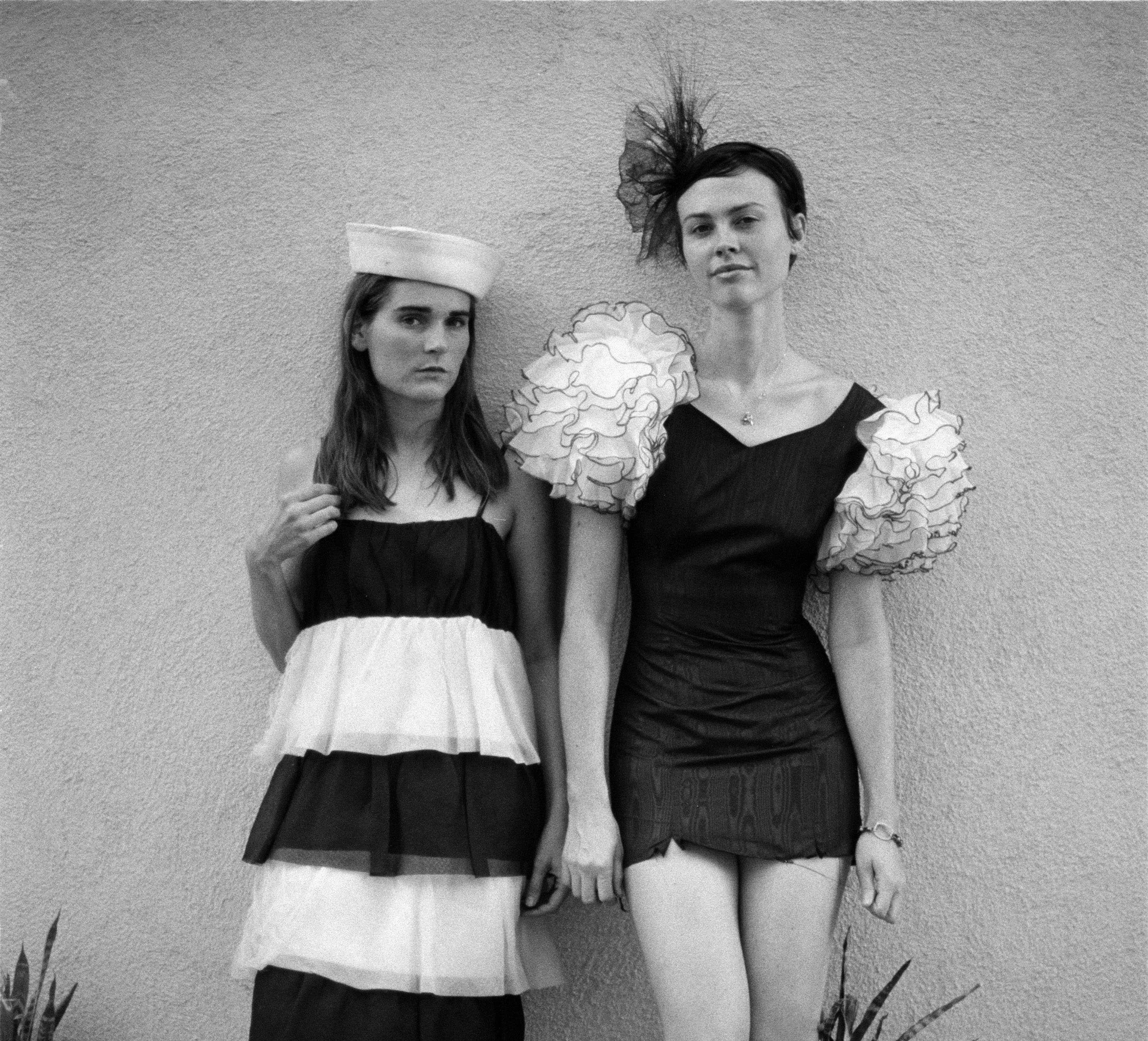

Background information
- Origin: Los Angeles, California, U.S.
- Genres: Folk; bluegrass; country; blues; western swing; ragtime
- Years active: 2004–2012
- Labels: Warner; independent
- Past members: Abby DeWald; Amanda Barrett
- Website: http://www.thedittybops.com/

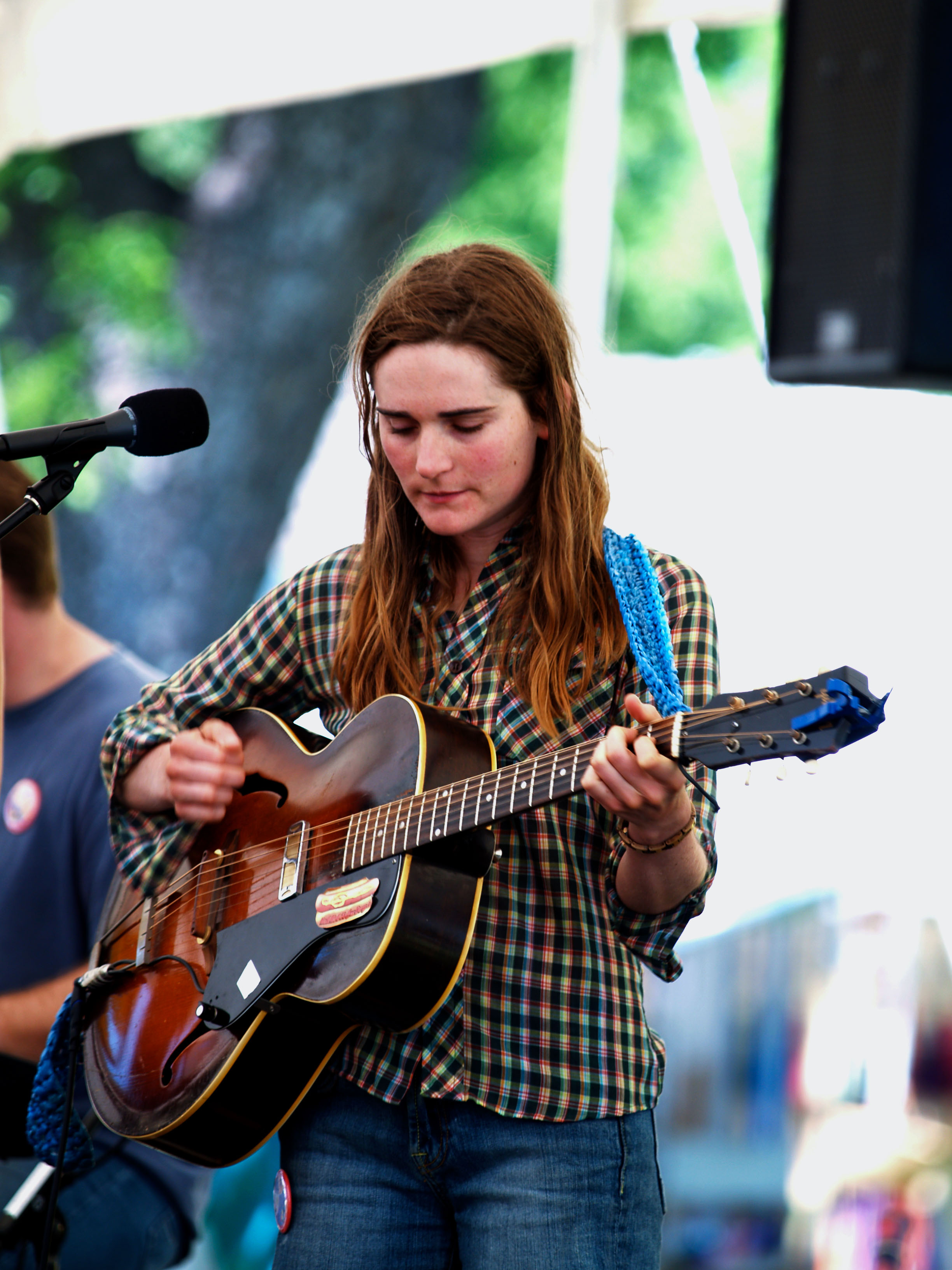
Abby DeWald in 2007

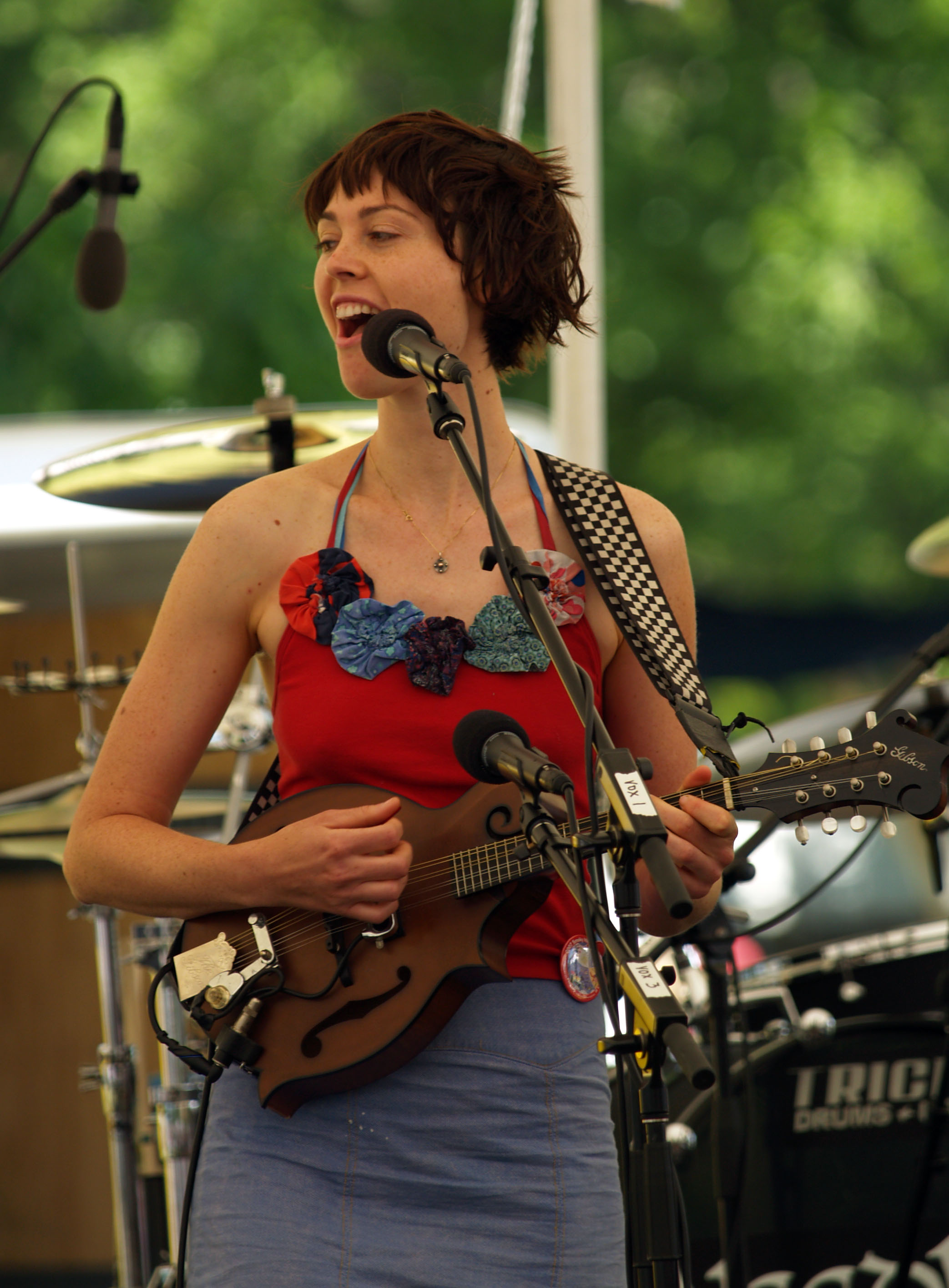
Amanda Barrett in 2007

The Ditty Bops were an American band from Los Angeles, California, under label WMG, and later self-produced. Noted for the tight vocal harmonies of members Abby DeWald and Amanda Barrett, the duo incorporated a variety of musical styles such as folk, bluegrass, blues, western swing, ragtime and musical theater with guitar, ukulele, mandolin and dulcimer. Their live shows were often very interactive, and had different themes and theatrical elements complete with props, costumes, skits, and amusing slide shows.

== History ==
Romantically involved since around 1998, DeWald and Barrett met in New York City and formed the Ditty Bops years later after a hunt for a neighbor's lost cat. When they unwittingly crossed into the backyard of a stranger, they discovered that he was a musician and an avid guitar collector. A former record producer with ABC-Dunhill, he encouraged them to form a band and start playing.

Their music was prominently featured in the first season of the ABC television series Grey's Anatomy, including "Wake Up", "Walk or Ride", "Wishful Thinking", "Sister Kate" and "There's a Girl". The latter is also featured on the show's fourth season soundtrack. Noted for popularising obscure indie artists, the show often used their music as a motif for the quirky and domestic, contrasting with the show's more heavy and emotional facets. Sarah Drew performed "Wake Up" in tribute at "The Songs Beneath the Show", a Grey's Anatomy Benefit Concert, in 2012. The band has also been featured on The L Word.

The Ditty Bops appeared twice on the A Prairie Home Companion radio show with Garrison Keillor: May 7, 2005, from Mitchell, South Dakota, and June 18, 2005, from Highland Park, Illinois.

From May 23 through September 2, 2006, the Ditty Bops embarked on a cross-country tour by bicycle to promote the release of their second album, Moon Over the Freeway, while advocating a call-to-action about pollution and energy conservation. They traveled from Los Angeles to New York City, logging 4,502.75 miles.

In October 2008, Abby and Amanda announced their marriage in California via an e-mail message to their fans and MySpace blog.

== Discography ==
- The Ditty Bops (CD) – Warner Bros. Records – 2004
- Moon Over the Freeway (CD) – Warner Bros. Records – 2006
- Pack Rat (EP) – Ditty Bops Music – 2007
- Summer Rains (CD) – Ditty Bops Music – 2008
- Songs for Steve (EP) – Ditty Bops Music – 2009
- The Color Album (EP) – Ditty Bops Music – 2010
- Love Letters (CD) – Ditty Bops Music – 2011
- Jelly for President - Yes We Jam (CD) – Ditty Bops Music – 2011
