= Over My Shoulder (album) =

Studio album by Mel Parsons
- Released: 9 March 2009
- Genres: Folk, alternative country
- Length: 39:12
- Label: Cape Road Recordings
- Producers: Mel Parsons, David Long, Shaun Elley

Mel Parsons chronology
Over My Shoulder (2009)	Red Grey Blue (2011)

Professional ratings
Review scores
Source	Rating
Under the Radar	4/5 stars

Over My Shoulder is Mel Parsons' debut album, released on 9 March 2009 on Cape Road Recordings. Parsons returned to New Zealand to start work on her debut album in 2007. The album was written by Parsons, and recorded with co-producer Shaun Elley and her backing band The Rhythm Kings, along with support from Don McGlashan, The Sami Sisters, Lisa Tomlins, and Neil Watson. Parsons created her own label, Cape Road Recordings, so she could release her album independently while using the New Zealand music firm Border Music for distribution. The album was nominated for the Tui NZ Music Award's Folk Album of the Year.

== Track list ==
All tracks are written by Mel Parsons, all songs arranged by Mel Parsons and Shaun Elley

No.	Title	Length
1.	"Still Life"	4:00
2.	"It's Been Good"	4:38
3.	"Darlin' Darlin'"	3:13
4.	"Pleasure & Pain"	3:23
5.	"Against the Tide"	4:10
6.	"Song for Mrs King"	3:56
7.	"On Your Grave"	3:40
8.	"Falling for You"	4:46
9.	"Far Fetched Idea"	2:53
10.	"Down in the Bar"	2:36
11.	"You & I"	1:57

== Personnel ==
Musicians

- Mel Parsons – vocals, guitar
- Shaun Elley – drums
- Aaron Stewart - double bass
- Ed Zuccollo - keys
- The Sami Sisters – vocal harmony
- Don McGlashan - euphonium (track 7)

Production

- Mel Parsons - producer
- David Long - producer
- Shaun Elley - producer
- Mike Gibson – mastering
- Richard Shirley - engineering

== Chart ==
Chart	Peak position
Top 20 IMNZ Albums	16
