= Retriever (album) =

Studio album by Ron Sexsmith
- Released: April 6, 2004
- Genre: Rock
- Length: 40:02
- Label: Nettwerk
- Producer: Martin Terefe

Ron Sexsmith chronology
Rarities (2003)	Retriever (2004)	Destination Unknown (2005)

Professional ratings
Review scores
Source	Rating
AllMusic	4/5 stars
Pitchfork Media	(7.3/10)
Rolling Stone	3.5/5 stars

Retriever is the eighth studio album from Canadian singer-songwriter Ron Sexsmith. "Whatever It Takes" was released as a single and reached #24 in Canada.

== Track listing ==
All songs written by Ronald Eldon Sexsmith.

1. "Hard Bargain" – 3:13
2. "Imaginary Friends" – 3:42
3. "Not About to Lose" – 3:00
4. "Tomorrow in Her Eyes" – 2:29
5. "From Now On" – 4:39
6. "For the Driver" – 2:47
7. "Wishing Wells" – 4:08
8. "Whatever It Takes" – 3:21
9. "Dandelion Wine" – 3:29
10. "Happiness" – 2:32
11. "How on Earth" – 4:10
12. "I Know It Well" – 2:39

== Cover versions ==
The Art of Time Ensemble featuring Sarah Slean recorded "Dandelion Wine" on their 2009 album Black Flowers. Canadian singer Michael Bublé released a version of the song "Whatever It Takes" in 2009 featuring Sexsmith which was included on Bublé's 2009 album Crazy Love. A cover of Hard Bargain appears on and is the namesake for Emmylou Harris's most recent album, 2011's Hard Bargain.
