= Mitchell Froom =

American musician and record producer

- Born: June 29, 1953 (age 73)
- Origin: United States
- Occupations: Musician; record producer
- Instrument: Keyboards
- Years active: 1976–present
- Labels: Slash; Warner Bros.; Kontext

Mitchell Froom (born June 29, 1953) is an American musician and record producer. He was a member of the bands Gamma and Latin Playboys, and is the keyboardist for Crowded House. He has produced albums for several artists, including David LaFlamme, Richard Thompson, Los Lobos, Suzanne Vega, Joan Osborne and Vonda Shepard.

== Career ==
Froom began his career as a keyboard player in Sonoma County, California. The band Crossfire featured two keyboard players; Mitchell on one side of the stage and his brother David on the other with Gary Pihl on guitar. He also played keyboards on the Ronnie Montrose-led group Gamma's third album Gamma 3, and the first two solo albums of David LaFlamme (of It's a Beautiful Day fame) titled White Bird and Inside Out. The latter two projects he also co-produced with LaFlamme.

He then produced the first three Crowded House albums, which led to more production jobs with Richard Thompson, Los Lobos, American Music Club, Suzanne Vega and Paul McCartney. In 1982, Froom scored the adult film Café Flesh; his soundtrack was later released as the album Key of Cool. In the late 1980s, Crowded House leader Neil Finn invited Froom to join the band as an official member, but Froom declined due to his producing career.

In 1987 he produced and wrote incidental music for the neo-noir film Slam Dance.

Between 1990 and 2002 Froom formed a full-time partnership with engineer Tchad Blake. Production credits include albums from American Music Club, Stevie Ann, Tasmin Archer, the Bangles, Peter Case, the Corrs, Elvis Costello, Sheryl Crow, Crowded House, the Del Fuegos, the Ditty Bops, Tim Finn, Robin Gibb, Missy Higgins, Indigo Girls, Los Lobos, Maria McKee, Pat McLaughlin, Randy Newman, Nerina Pallot, Pearl Jam, Phantom Planet, Bonnie Pink, Daniel Powter, the Pretenders, Bonnie Raitt, Ron Sexsmith, Richard Thompson, and Suzanne Vega. Froom and Blake joined with David Hidalgo and Louie Perez of Los Lobos to form the experimental roots collaboration Latin Playboys.

Froom has produced over 60 albums and has composed and produced music for numerous films. He has been nominated for several Grammys including for Record of the Year for La Bamba by Los Lobos (1988) and Producer of the Year in 1993 for both Kiko by Los Lobos and 99.9F° by Suzanne Vega. He was also nominated for the 1998 Golden Globe Award and the 1999 Grammy for Best Song Written for a Motion Picture, Television or Other Visual Media for co-writing with Sheryl Crow the James Bond movie title song "Tomorrow Never Dies".

As a musician, Froom has released two solo albums, Dopamine (1998) and A Thousand Days (2005). The song "Noodletown" from "Dopamine" won an Emmy when it was used as the theme for PBS's Sessions at West 54th.

Froom was a judge for the 2nd annual Independent Music Awards to support independent artists' careers.

In December 2019 Froom was announced as a member of the new lineup of Crowded House. The first album with this lineup, Dreamers Are Waiting, was released on June 4, 2021.

== Personal life ==
Froom is of Romanian ancestry. His brother was David Froom, a classical composer and Department Chair of the Music Department at St. Mary's College of Maryland.

His first wife was Connie Jester, with whom he had a daughter, Charlotte Froom (born 1986). Charlotte was the bassist in the Like.

Froom married Suzanne Vega in 1995; they separated and divorced in 1998. Soul Coughing's 1994 album, Ruby Vroom, was named after their daughter, Ruby Froom (born July 8, 1994).

He married Vonda Shepard in 2004. They have a son, Jack Froom (April 15, 2006), named for Froom's late father, a physician and educator.

== Discography ==
With American Music Club

- Mercury (Reprise/Virgin, 1993)

With Tasmin Archer

- Bloom (EMI, 1996)

With Tracy Bonham

- Down Here (Island Records, 2000)
- Blink the Brightest (Zoe Records, 2005)

With Peter Case

- Peter Case (album) (Geffen Records, 1986)
- The Man with the Blue Post-Modern Fragmented Neo-Traditionalist Guitar (Geffen Records, 1989)
- Six-Pack of Love (Geffen Records, 1992)

With Tracy Chapman

- Where You Live (Elektra Records, 2005)

With Cibo Matto

- Viva! La Woman (Warner Bros., 1996)
- Super Relax (Warner Bros., 1997)

With Rita Coolidge

- Inside the Fire (A&M Records, 1984)

With the Corrs

- Unplugged (Atlantic Records, 1999)
- In Blue (Atlantic Records, 2000)
- VH1 Presents: The Corrs, Live in Dublin (Atlantic Records, 2002)
- Home (Atlantic Records, 2005)

With Elvis Costello

- Mighty Like a Rose (Warner Bros., 1991)
- Brutal Youth (Warner Bros., 1994)

With Marshall Crenshaw

- Downtown (Warner Bros. Records, 1985)

With Sheryl Crow

- Sheryl Crow (A&M Records, 1996)
- The Globe Sessions (A&M Records, 1998)

With Crowded House

- Crowded House (Capitol Records, 1986)
- Temple of Low Men (Capitol Records, 1988)
- Woodface (Capitol Records, 1991)
- Dreamers Are Waiting (BMG Rights Management, 2021)
- Gravity Stairs (BMG Rights Management, 2024)

With Del Fuegos

- The Longest Day (Slash Records, 1984)
- Boston, Mass. (Slash Records, 1985)
- Stand Up (Slash Records, 1987)

With the Ditty Bops

- The Ditty Bops (album) (Warner Bros., 2004)
- Moon Over The Freeway (Warner Bros., 2006)

With Dave Dobbyn

- Lament for the Numb (Trafalgar Records, 1993)

With Bob Dylan

- Down in the Groove (Columbia Records, 1988)

With Neil Finn

- Try Whistling This (Parlophone Records, 1998)
- One Nil (Parlophone Records, 2001)

With Tim Finn

- Tim Finn (Capitol Records, 1989)

With Finn Brothers

- Everyone is Here (Nettwerk/Parlophone Records, 2004)

With Peter Gabriel

- Up (Geffen, 2002)

With Boris Grebenshchikov

- Salt (2014)

With Missy Higgins

- On a Clear Night (Eleven, 2007)

With Susanna Hoffs

- Someday (Baroque Folk, 2012)

With Indigo Girls

- Poseidon and the Bitter Bug (Vanguard Records, 2009)

With David LaFlamme

- White Bird (Amherst Records, 1976)
- Inside Out (Amherst Records, 1978)

With Los Lobos

- Kiko (Slash Records, 1992)
- Colossal Head (Warner Bros., 1996)
- This Time (Warner Bros., 1999)

With Paul McCartney

- Flowers in the Dirt (Parlophone Records, 1989)

With Maria McKee

- Maria McKee (Geffen, 1989)

With Eddie Money

- Where's the Party? (Columbia Records, 1983)

With Randy Newman

- Bad Love (DreamWorks Records, 1999)
- Harps and Angels (Nonesuch Records, 2008)
- Dark Matter (Nonesuch Records, 2017)

With Stina Nordenstam

- This Is Stina Nordenstam (Independiente, 2001)

With Roy Orbison

- Mystery Girl (Virgin Records, 1989)

With Mel Parsons

- Glass Heart (Cape Road Recordings, 2018)

With Phantom Planet

- The Guest (Epic, 2002)

With Daniel Powter

- Daniel Powter (Warner Bros. Records, 2005)

With the Pretenders

- Packed! (Sire Records, 1990)

With Bonnie Raitt

- Longing in Their Hearts (Capitol Records, 1994)
- Fundamental (Capitol Records, 1998)
- Silver Lining (Capitol Records, 2002)
- Souls Alike (Capitol Records, 2005)

With Stan Ridgway

- The Big Heat (I.R.S. Records, 1986)

With Ron Sexsmith

- Ron Sexsmith (Interscope, 1995)
- Other Songs (Interscope, 1997)
- Whereabouts (Interscope, 1999)
- Time Being (V2 Records, 2006)
- Forever Endeavour (Cooking Vinyl, 2013)

With Vonda Shepard

- The Radical Light (Reprise/Warner Bros. Records, 1992)
- By 7:30 (Jacket Records, 1999)
- Chinatown (Edel Records, 2002)
- From the Sun (Redeye Distribution, 2008)

With Richard Thompson

- Daring Adventures (Polydor Records, 1986)
- Amnesia (Capitol Records, 1988)
- Rumor and Sigh (Capitol Records, 1991)
- Mirror Blue (Capitol Records, 1994)
- You? Me? Us? (Capitol Records, 1996)

With Triggerfinger

- Colossus (Mascot Records, 2017)

With Suzanne Vega

- 99.9F° (A&M Records, 1992)
- Nine Objects of Desire (A&M Records, 1996)

With Rufus Wainwright

- Unfollow the Rules (BMG, 2020)
- Folkocracy (BMG, 2023)
