= Cobblestone Runway =

Studio album by Ron Sexsmith
- Released: November 2, 2002
- Genre: Rock
- Length: 44:08
- Label: Nettwerk
- Producer: Martin Terefe

Ron Sexsmith chronology
| Blue Boy (2001) | Cobblestone Runway (2002) | Retriever (2004) |

Professional ratings
Aggregate scores
| Source | Rating |
|---|---|
| Metacritic | 84/100 |
Review scores
| Source | Rating |
| AllMusic | 4.5/5 stars |
| Blender | 3/5 stars |
| Drowned in Sound | 7/10 |
| Entertainment Weekly | A |
| The Guardian | 4/5 stars |
| Mojo | 3/5 stars |
| Q | 4/5 stars |
| Uncut | 7/10 |

Cobblestone Runway is the sixth studio album from Canadian singer-songwriter Ron Sexsmith. The album also features a second version of the song "Gold in Them Hills" as a bonus, featuring a duet vocal with Coldplay's Chris Martin. Some printings of the album came with a second disc, a re-release of "Grand Opera Lane."

In 2012, Katie Melua released a version of "Gold in Them Hills" from her album, Secret Symphony.

== Track listing ==
All songs written by Ronald Eldon Sexsmith.

1. "Former Glory" – 2:55
2. "These Days" – 3:23
3. "Least That I Can Do" – 4:26
4. "God Loves Everyone" – 3:09
5. "Disappearing Act" – 3:41
6. "For a Moment There" – 3:04
7. "Gold in Them Hills" – 3:34
8. "Heart's Desire" – 4:20
9. "Dragonfly on Bay Street" – 3:24
10. "The Less I Know" – 4:13
11. "Up the Road" – 2:54
12. "Best Friends" – 1:53
13. "You Cross My Mind" (Japanese Bonus Track)
14. "Gold in Them Hills (Remix)" (featuring Chris Martin) – 3:40

== Personnel ==
- Ron Sexsmith – vocals, acoustic guitar, electric guitar, piano
- Martin Terefe – producer, bass, synthesizers, hi-hats, backing vocals, marimbas
- Glen Scott – Fender Rhodes, backing vocals
- Christer Jansson – drums, percussion, brushes
- Claes Bjorklund – noises, string machine, grooves, synth bass, vocoder, synthesizers, drums, piano, bass, Fender Rhodes, mirage operator, funk guitar
- Andreas Olsson – bells, electronic grooves, noises
- Kim Fleming – choir
- George Pendergrass – choir
- Chris Willis – choir
- Steve Crawford – choir
- Gale West – choir
- David Davidson – violin, string arranger
- David Angell – violin
- Kristin Wilkinson – viola
- John Catchings – cello
- Chris Martin – vocals
