= Slow Burn (Mel Parsons album) =

Studio album by Mel Parsons
- Released: 16 September 2022
- Genres: Indie folk, Americana, country rock, alt rock
- Length: 42:08
- Label: Cape Road
- Producer: Josh Logan

Mel Parsons chronology
Glass Heart (2018)	Slow Burn (2022)

Professional ratings
Review scores
Source	Rating
Muzic	5/5 stars

Slow Burn is the fifth album by New Zealand singer-songwriter Mel Parsons, released on 16 September 2022 on Cape Road Recordings.

== Development ==
Parsons wrote the songs of the album starting in 2020 at her home in Lyttelton, New Zealand with guitarist and producer Josh Logan. Parsons is a self-managing artist who makes her living as a touring performer, but the COVID-19 pandemic slowed that done, reducing the gigs and the income. To keep busy from early 2020 onwards, Parsons recorded the new music with Logan, while also performing in showcase performances such as live tribute shows for Dire Straits, Beatles, and Elton John. Her first single released, "Carry On" was adopted as an anthem for people getting through the pandemic lockdowns, although the song was written earlier. Additional singles released prior to the album release include "Already Gone" and "Slow Burn".

Slow Burn was recorded at LOHO Studios in Christchurch, New Zealand. Josh Logan recorded and produced the album, as well as leading the band by performing on guitar, piano, and backing vocals. The band also consisted of Parsons cousin Jed Parsons on drums and backing vocals, and Aaron Steward on bass. Parsons arranged for the band to come into the studio without having heard any of the songs with the intention of providing the sessions a vital energy, a different feel than recording songs that have been played while touring prior to visiting the studio.

== Track listing ==
All tracks are written by Mel Parsons

Slow Burn track listing
No.	Title	Length
1.	"Lights"	2:28
2.	"Slow Burn"	3:55
3.	"Carry On"	4:20
4.	"Going Under"	2:59
5.	"Already Gone"	3:50
6.	"Failure"	4:14
7.	"Headland"	4:25
8.	"Tunnel Vision"	4:55
9.	"Tired of Being You"	3:13
10.	"Darkness"	3:58
11.	"Still Got Time"	3:51

== Personnel ==
Musicians

- Mel Parsons – vocals, guitars
- Aaron Stewart – bass
- Josh Logan – guitars, piano, backing vocals
- Jed Parsons – drums, backing vocals
- Naomi Hnat – cello
- L.A. Mitchell – piano (track 7)

Production

- Josh Logan – producer, mixing
- Oliver Harmer – mastering
- Adam Hogan – engineering

== Charts ==
Chart performance for Slow Burn
Chart (2022)	Peak position
New Zealand Albums (RMNZ)	3
