= Ron Sexsmith =

Canadian musician (born 1964)

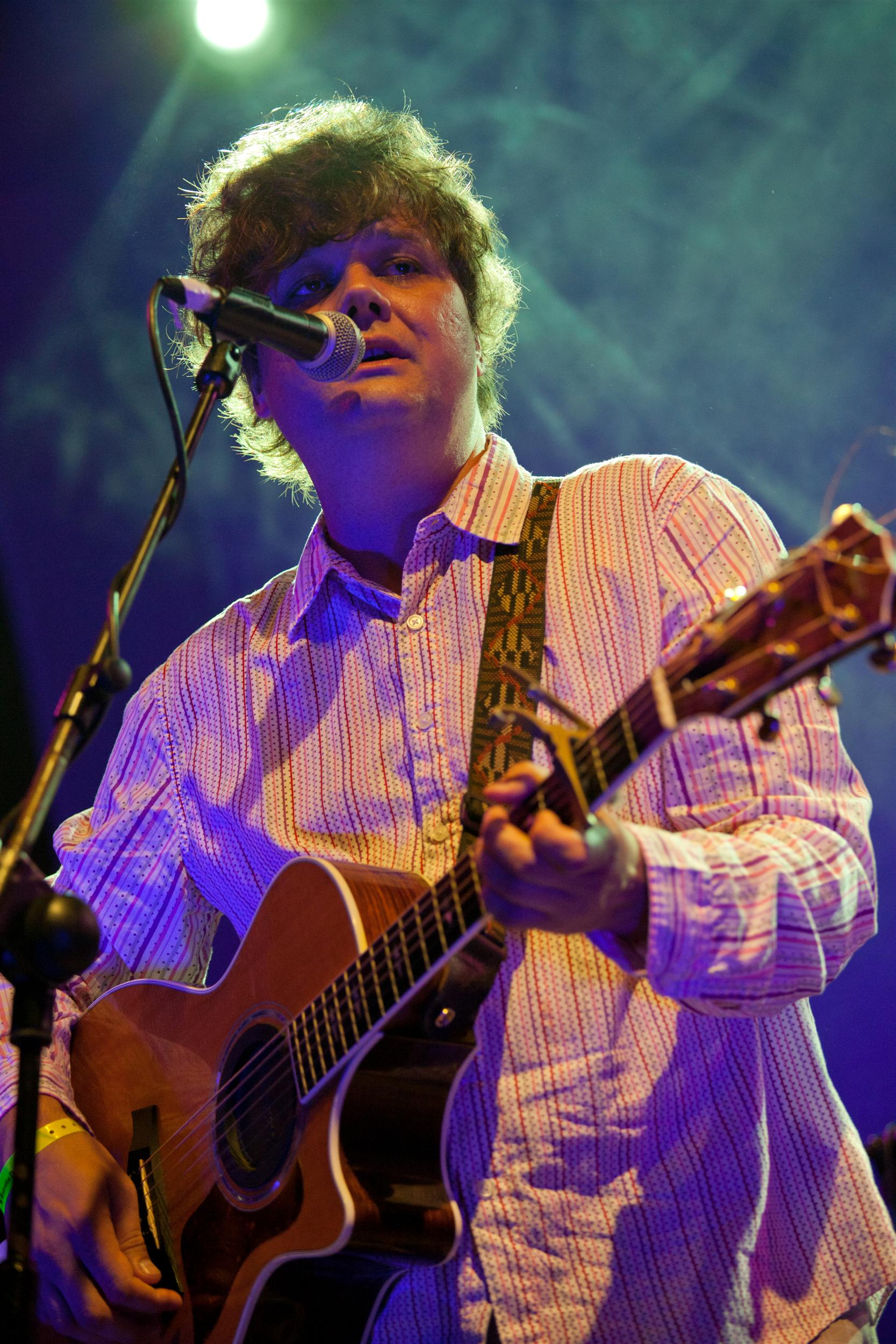
- Sexsmith in 2011

Background information
- Born: Ronald Eldon Sexsmith; January 8, 1964 (age 62); St. Catharines, Canada
- Genres: Pop; folk
- Occupations: Musician; songwriter
- Instruments: Vocals; guitar
- Years active: 1978–present
- Label: Warner Bros.
- Website: ronsexsmith.com

Ronald Eldon Sexsmith (born January 8, 1964) is a Canadian singer-songwriter from St. Catharines, Ontario. He was the songwriter of the year at the 2005 Juno Awards. He began releasing recordings of his own material in 1985 at age 21 and has since recorded eighteen albums. He was the subject of a 2010 documentary called Love Shines.

== Early life ==
Sexsmith grew up in St. Catharines and started his own band when he was 14 years old.

== Career ==
Sexsmith was seventeen when he started playing at a bar, the Lion's Tavern, in his hometown. He gained a reputation as "The One-Man Jukebox" for his aptitude in playing requests. However, he gradually began to include original songs and more obscure music, which his audience did not favour. He decided to start writing songs after the birth of his first child in 1985. That same year, still living in St. Catharines, he collaborated on recording and releasing a cassette, Out of the Duff, with a singer-songwriter friend named Claudio. Side one of the cassette contained five songs written and performed by Sexsmith; side two featured Claudio.

A year later, Sexsmith and his family moved to Toronto, living in an apartment in the Beaches neighbourhood. Sexsmith recorded and released the full-length cassette There's a Way, which was produced by Kurt Swinghammer.

After the album Grand Opera Lane, produced by Bob Wiseman, was rejected by several Canadian labels, the pair released it independently in 1991. Grand Opera Lane was credited to "Ron Sexsmith and the Uncool"; the backing band including Don Kerr and Steve Charles, and also featured Sarah McElcheran (horn arrangements) and Kim Ratcliffe on electric guitar. Attention garnered by the song "Speaking with the Angel", Sexsmith earned a contract that led to his self-titled album in 1995. The record was praised by Elvis Costello, for whom Sexsmith later opened.

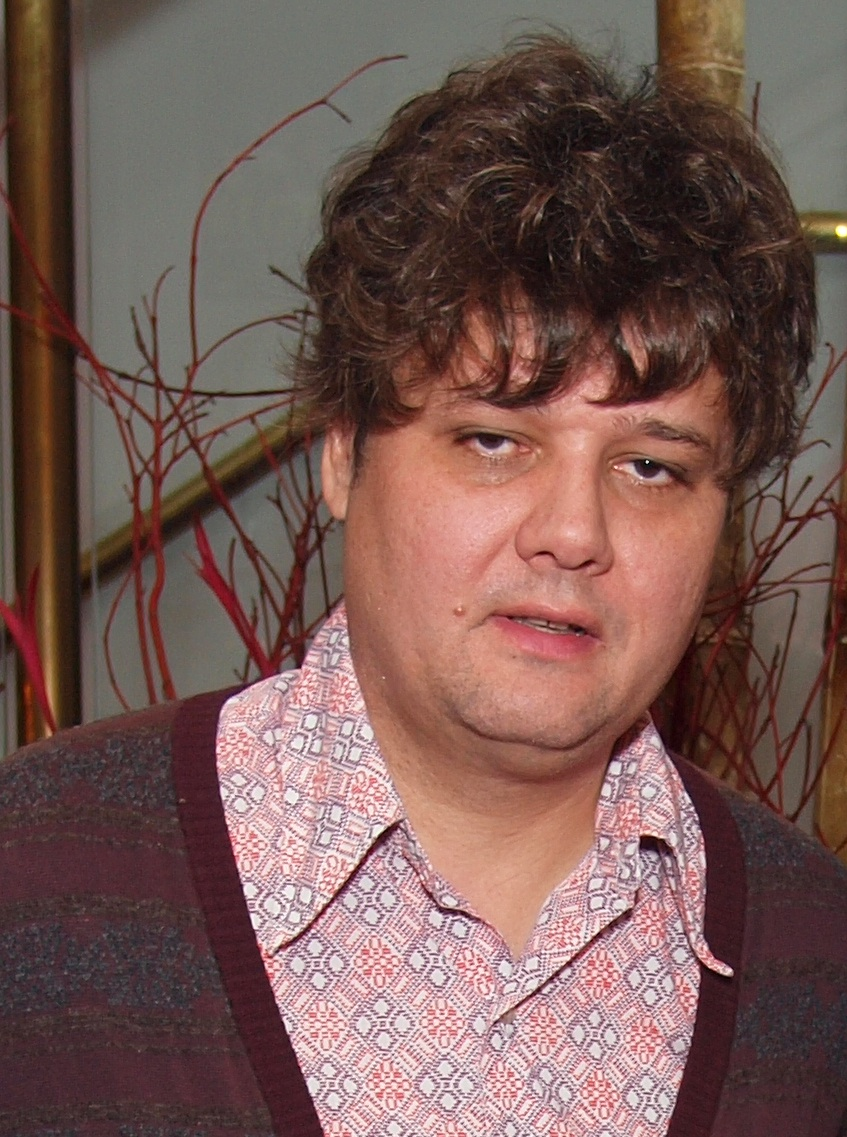
Sexsmith in November 2010

Between 1997 and 2001, Sexsmith released three more albums, and then Cobblestone Runway in 2002. Retriever, his next album, is a more pop-oriented album and is dedicated to Elliott Smith and Johnny Cash. Sexsmith performed in the Toronto area in support of these albums.

On June 16, 2011, Sexsmith and his band performed The Kinks' song "Misfits" with Ray Davies at the Meltdown Festival in London, England. The same year, he won a songwriter of the year Juno Award for "Whatever It Takes" and a Canadian Indy Award. The album Long Player Late Bloomer was shortlisted for the Polaris Music Prize. Sexsmith's 14th full-length album, Carousel One, was released in March 2015.

In 2017, Sexsmith published his debut novel, Deer Life, through Dundurn Press. It was well received and Publishers Weekly wrote that the "novel has much the same effect as his music, conveying uncertainty with fearlessness and heart."

In February 2024, Sexsmith staged a retrospective concert at Toronto's Massey Hall, his fifth performance at the venue.

Sexsmith has collaborated with many artists throughout his career. In 2002, he sang a duet with Coldplay's Chris Martin in the song "Gold in Them Hills", which appeared as a bonus track on the album Cobblestone Runway. He also sang on "An Elephant Insect", which appears on the 2003 Shonen Knife album, Heavy Songs. In 2005, he released a collection of songs recorded with drummer Don Kerr during the production of Retriever, called Destination Unknown. Also in 2005, Sexsmith sang on the track "Song No. 6" by Norwegian singer-songwriter Ane Brun, which appeared on her album A Temporary Dive and again on her Duets album later the same year. In 2006, he performed a duet of "So Long Marianne" with Leonard Cohen in Yorkville, Toronto. In 2014, he wrote and sang a duet together with Dutch singer-songwriter Marike Jager, titled "Don't you", featured on her album The Silent Song.

Sexsmith's songs have been performed and recorded by a number of well-known musicians, including Elvis Costello, Feist, Rod Stewart, Emmylou Harris, and Nick Lowe. Sexsmith co-wrote "Brandy Alexander" with Feist—versions appear on his Exit Strategy of the Soul and on Feist's album The Reminder. A version of Sexsmith's "Whatever It Takes" appeared on Michael Bublé's 2009 album, Crazy Love.

In 2004, fellow Canadian singer-songwriter k.d. lang covered Sexsmith's song "Fallen" on her album Hymns of the 49th Parallel.

In 2010, Sexsmith appeared on "Liberace", a track off the album Vaudeville by Canadian rapper D-Sisive. In 2012, his song "Gold in them Hills" was included on Katie Melua's album Secret Symphony, and "Right About Now" was covered by Mari Wilson on the album Cover Stories.

In 2012, Sexsmith appeared on Lowe Country: The Songs of Nick Lowe, a Nick Lowe tribute album, where he covered Lowe's 1994 song "Where's My Everything?"

Sexsmith sang the lead vocals on a song from Ryan Granville-Martin's 2013 album, Mouthparts and Wings, which features a different vocalist on each track.

Sexsmith was featured on vocals on the Mel Parsons song "Don't Wait", from her 2015 album, Drylands.

In 2023, Sexsmith appeared on the track "Granddad's Song" by Swedish singer-songwriter Peter Morén's (Peter Bjorn and John) project SunYears, featured on the debut album, Come Fetch My Soul!

=== Writing ===
Sexsmith published a book on September 16, 2017, called Deer Life. It has been described as a "grown up fairy tale" by Sexsmith himself. It is the artist's first effort as an author.

== Personal life ==
Sexsmith has two children with his former common-law partner. Their fifteen-year relationship ended in 2001.

Sexsmith's wife, Colleen Hixenbaugh, is also a musician, formerly of By Divine Right.

== Discography ==
=== Albums ===
- Out of the Duff (Self-released cassette; split album, with side 2 by artist "Claudio") (1985)
- There's a Way (Self-released cassette) (1986)
- Grand Opera Lane (1986)
- Ron Sexsmith (1995)
- Other Songs (1997)
- Whereabouts (1999)
- Blue Boy (2001)
- Cobblestone Runway (2002)
- Rarities (2003)
- Retriever (2004)
- Destination Unknown with Don Kerr (2005)
- Time Being (2006)
- Exit Strategy of the Soul (2008)
- Long Player Late Bloomer (2011)
- Forever Endeavour (2013)
- Carousel One (2015)
- The Last Rider (2017)
- Hermitage (2020)
- The Vivian Line (2023)
- Hangover Terrace (2025)

=== Other contributions ===
- For the Love of Harry: Everybody Sings Nilsson – "Good Ol' Desk" (1995)
- Real: The Tom T. Hall Project – "Ships Go Out" (1998)
- Bleecker Street: Greenwich Village in the 60's – "Reason to Believe" (1999)
- This Is Where I Belong – The Songs of Ray Davies & The Kinks – "This Is Where I Belong" (2002)
- WYEP Live and Direct: Volume 4 – On Air Performances – "Just My Heart Talking" (2002)
- Maybe This Christmas – "Maybe This Christmas" (2002)
- Beautiful: A Tribute to Gordon Lightfoot – "Drifters" (2003)
- Beautiful Dreamer – The Songs of Stephen Foster – "Comrades Fill No Glass for Me" (2004)
- Our Power – "Love Henry" (with Don Kerr) (2006)
- Northern Songs: Canada's Best and Brightest – "All in Good Time" (2008)
- Redeye 2008 Holiday Sampler – "Something to Hold on to (At Christmas)" (2008)
- Crayon Angel: A Tribute to the Music of Judee Sill – "Crayon Angel" (2009)
- Crazy Love – "Whatever It Takes" (with Michael Buble) (2009)
- Harrison Covered: MOJO presents an Exclusive Tribute to George – "Give Me Love" (15-song CD given away free with MOJO magazine, November 2011 issue) (2011)
- This One's for Him: A Tribute to Guy Clark – "Broken Hearted People" (2011)
- Textuality OST – "Since I Don't Have You" (2012)
- Lowe Country: The Songs of Nick Lowe – "Where's My Everything" (2012)

=== The Kelele Brothers ===
- Escape from Bover County (2001)
- Has-Beens & Wives (2004)
