= Marin Honda =

Japanese figure skater (born 2001)

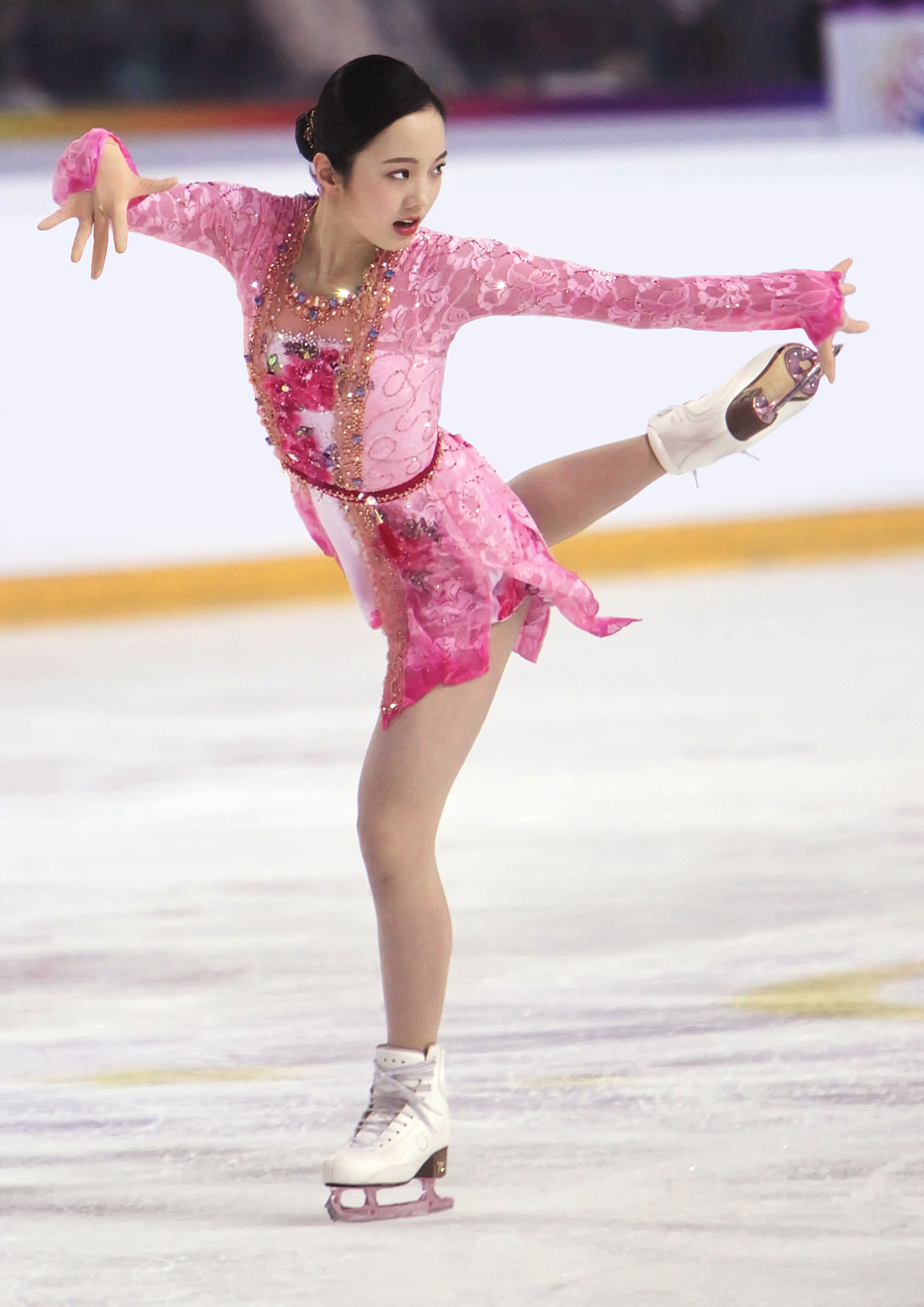
- Honda at the 2018 Internationaux de France

Personal information
- Native name: 本田 真凜
- Born: August 21, 2001 (age 25) Kyoto, Japan
- Home town: Kyoto
- Height: 1.63 m (5 ft 4 in)

Figure skating career
- Country: Japan
- Discipline: Ice dance (since 2026); Women's singles (until 2024)
- Partner: Shoma Uno
- Skating club: Japan Airlines
- Began skating: 2003
Medal record
Representing Japan
Figure skating: Ladies' singles
World Junior Championships
Gold medal – first place	2016 Debrecen	Ladies' singles
Silver medal – second place	2017 Taipei	Ladies' singles
Junior Grand Prix Final
Bronze medal – third place	2015–16 Barcelona	Ladies' singles

Marin Honda (本田 真凜, Honda Marin; born August 21, 2001) is a Japanese figure skater. As a singles skater, she is the 2016 World Junior champion, the 2017 World Junior silver medalist, the 2015–16 Junior Grand Prix Final bronze medalist, and the 2016–17 Japanese Junior National bronze medalist. She is the former junior world record holder for the free program.

In 2026, Honda came out of retirement to compete in the ice dance discipline with partner Shoma Uno.

== Personal life ==
Marin Honda was born on August 21, 2001, in Kyoto, Japan, the third born of five children. She has an elder brother, Taichi, an elder sister, Maho, and two younger sisters, Miyu and Sara. With the exception of Maho, all of her siblings are figure skaters, and Miyu is also a popular child actress in Japan. Honda previously studied and trained at Kansai University Middle School, which has an ice rink. Honda is a member of team RF and looks up to 2006 Olympic Champion Shizuka Arakawa. She enrolled in Meiji University's School of Political Science and Economics in spring 2020.

In September 2022, it was announced that she was in a relationship with Shoma Uno.

== Career ==
=== Singles skating ===
==== Early career ====
Honda began figure skating at the age of two after following her older brother, Taichi, into the sport.

In the 2011–12 season, Honda stood on the podium at four consecutive Japanese Novice Championships, with a gold medal in 2012–13. She was invited to skate in the gala at the World Team Trophy in the same season. She placed fifth at the Japan Junior Championships in 2013–14 and fourth the following season, training at Kansai University Middle School's ice rink. As the silver medalist of the 2014 Japanese novice nationals, she was invited to skate in the gala at the 2014 NHK Trophy. Her Lutz and flip are hindered by hallux valgus.

==== 2015–16 season: World Junior Champion ====
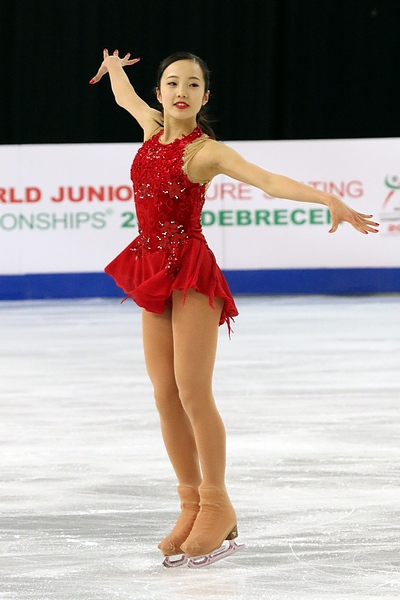
Honda at the 2016 World Junior Championships

Honda debuted on the ISU Junior Grand Prix (JGP) circuit in the 2015–16 season. Ranked first in the short program and fourth in the free skate, she came away with the silver medal at the JGP in Colorado Springs, Colorado, having finished behind Yuna Shiraiwa by a margin of 8.06 points. She won gold at her second JGP event, in Zagreb, Croatia, after placing third in the short and first in the free — outscoring Wakaba Higuchi by 6.16 points. These results qualified her for the 2015–16 JGP Final in Barcelona. In November, Honda placed sixth at the 2015-16 Japanese Junior Championships.

At the 2015–16 JGP Final in Barcelona, Honda won the bronze medal behind Russia's Polina Tsurskaya and Maria Sotskova.

Making her debut at the Japan Championships on the senior level, Honda finished ninth and was named in Japan's team to the 2016 World Junior Championships in Debrecen. Ranked second in the short program and first in the free skate, she was awarded gold in Hungary, ahead of Russia's Maria Sotskova and teammate Wakaba Higuchi.

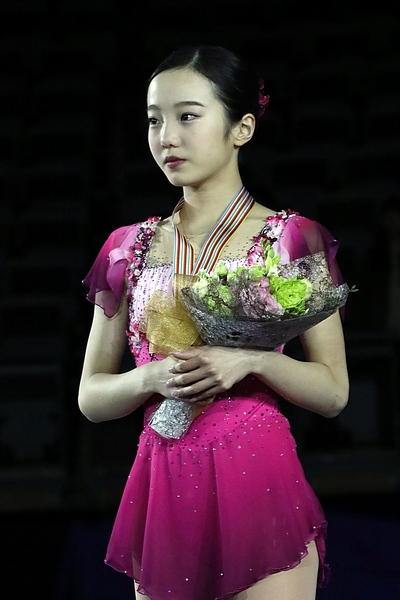
Honda at the 2017 World Junior Championships podium

==== 2016–17 season ====
Honda began her season with a gold medal at the 2016 Asian Trophy. She was assigned to the JGP events in Japan and Slovenia. In her first event at JGP Yokohama, she placed fifth in the short program and won the free skate with a junior world record of 128.64 points to place second overall. In her next event at JGP Ljubljana, she won another silver medal, qualifying her for her second JGP Final. However, she withdrew from the Final, citing illness. In November, she won the bronze medal at the Japan Junior National Championships.

She placed fourth overall at her second senior Japan National Championships and was assigned to compete at the 2017 World Junior Championships in Taipei. She ranked second in both segments, setting new personal bests and was awarded the silver medal behind gold medalist Alina Zagitova and ahead of bronze medalist Kaori Sakamoto. She was invited to skate in the gala at the 2017 World Team Trophy.

==== 2017–18 season: Senior debut ====
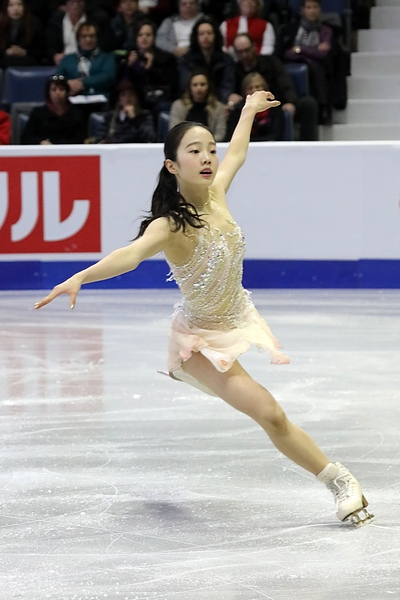
Honda at the 2017 Skate Canada International

Honda began her senior debut with a gold medal at the 2017 US Classic in Salt Lake City. She competed in her first team event at Japan Open and won the silver medal with her teammates.

Honda made her senior Grand Prix debut at the 2017 Skate Canada. She was tenth in the short program after falling in her triple Lutz-triple toe combination and popping her planned double Axel into a single but managed to place third in the free skate to place fifth overall. In her next event at the 2017 Cup of China, she placed sixth in the short program and fifth in the free skate to place fifth overall. At the 2017-18 Japan Nationals, she was sixth in the short program and ninth in the free skate, placing seventh overall. She later competed at the 2018 Challenge Cup, where she was eleventh after the short program. She placed second in the free skate, winning the bronze medal.

On March 30, she announced she was changing coaches to Rafael Arutyunyan and was moving to the US with her brother, Taichi, to live and train full-time.

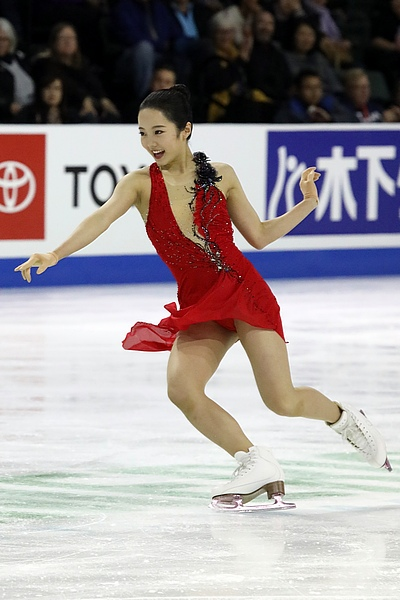
Honda performing at the 2018 Skate America

==== 2018–19 season ====
Honda began her season in September at 2018 CS Nebelhorn Trophy, where she placed sixth. In October, she competed at her first Grand Prix event of the season, 2018 Skate America, where she was fourth in the short program and placed eighth overall. She then competed at her second Grand Prix event in November, 2018 Internationaux de France, where she placed fourth in the short program and finished sixth overall. At the 2018 Japanese National Championships in December, she was eighteenth after the short program and placed fifteenth overall.

==== 2019–20 season ====
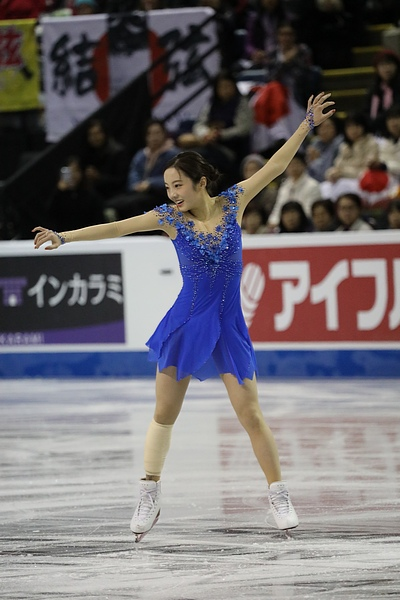
Honda at the 2019 Skate Canada

Honda began the season at the 2019 CS Nebelhorn Trophy, where she placed fifth. Initially assigned to only one Grand Prix, Honda was subsequently added to the 2019 Skate Canada International roster following the withdrawal of Mai Mihara. Whilst travelling from the arena in Kelowna, she and fellow Japanese skater Keiji Tanaka were involved in a car crash. Honda was cleared to compete despite injuries to her right shin and forehead and wore a support brace, saying, "I decided to compete, and I'm going all the way to the end." Honda was tenth in the short program after doubling a planned triple flip and underrotating the second part of her jump combination but rose to sixth place after skating a stronger free skate with scaled-down content. She was seventh at the 2019 Cup of China. She ended the season with an eighth-place finish at the Japanese Championships.

==== 2020–21 season ====
Honda withdrew from the Japan Open after dislocating her shoulder. She competed at Eastern Sectionals, placing tenth. Assigned to the Grand Prix at the 2020 NHK Trophy, she placed ninth. Following that competition, Honda relocated to Toyota, Shin-Yokohama with Nobuo Satō becoming her new coach.

Honda placed tenth at Eastern Sectionals to qualify for the Japan Championships. However, she withdrew from the Championships after collapsing of dizziness before a morning practice at the event.

==== 2021–22 season ====
Honda placed twenty-first at the 2021–22 Japan Championships.

==== 2022–23 season ====
Honda placed twenty-sixth at the 2022–23 Japan Championships.

During the off-season, Honda and her sister, Miyu, were cast to star in the summer show, One Piece on Ice, with Honda being cast to play Nefeltari Vivi and Miyu being cast to play Nami.

==== 2023–24 season ====
Competing at the 2023–24 Japan Championships, Honda finished twenty-eighth. Prior to the event, Honda suffered an injury to her right pelvis.

On January 5, 2024, Honda's management announced her decision to retire from competitive figure skating at the end of the season. Following this announcement, Honda stated, "I really like skating. As long as I can continue skating, I will continue skating if everyone wants to watch it."

=== Ice dance with Shoma Uno ===
==== Partnership formation ====
Following his retirement from singles skating, Honda's boyfriend, Shoma Uno, approached her with the suggestion that he and her take on the challenge of learning how to ice dance together. Uno later shared that the idea came to him due to his desire for more people to witness Honda's expressiveness as a skater. "I had no regrets about singles," he said. "However, I think people don't fully understand how wonderful Marin's skating is." Following a period of deliberation, Honda agreed to the idea and the partnership officially formed in October 2024. Honda/Uno first debuted as a team in June 2025 during "Ice Brave," a show that was organized by Uno.

In March 2026, Honda/Uno received additional training at the Ice Academy of Montréal.

==== 2026–2027 season ====
On May 22, 2026, Honda/Uno announced their plans to pursue ice dance competitively with the goal of competing at the 2030 Winter Olympics. "We chose to begin in the 2026 season because of our strong desire to seriously pursue the 2030 Winter Olympics as competitors," Uno said. Additionally, Honda/Uno stated that they did not yet have an official coaching team and as a result, Uno's longtime singles skating coach, Stéphane Lambiel, would accompany them to competitions.

== Records and achievements ==
- Set the junior-level ladies record for the free program to 128.64 points at the 2016 JGP Japan on September 11, 2016. Her record was broken at the 2016 JGP Germany by Anastasiia Gubanova (Russia) on October 8, 2016.

== Programs ==
=== Ice dance with Shoma Uno ===
Competition and exhibition programs by season
Season	Rhythm dance program	Free dance program	Exhibition program
2026–27	"Poeta": Composed by Vicente Amigo; Choreo. by Kenji Miyamoto	The Four Seasons: Composed by Antonio Vivaldi; Performed by Max Richter; Choreo. by Jean-Luc Baker	—N/a

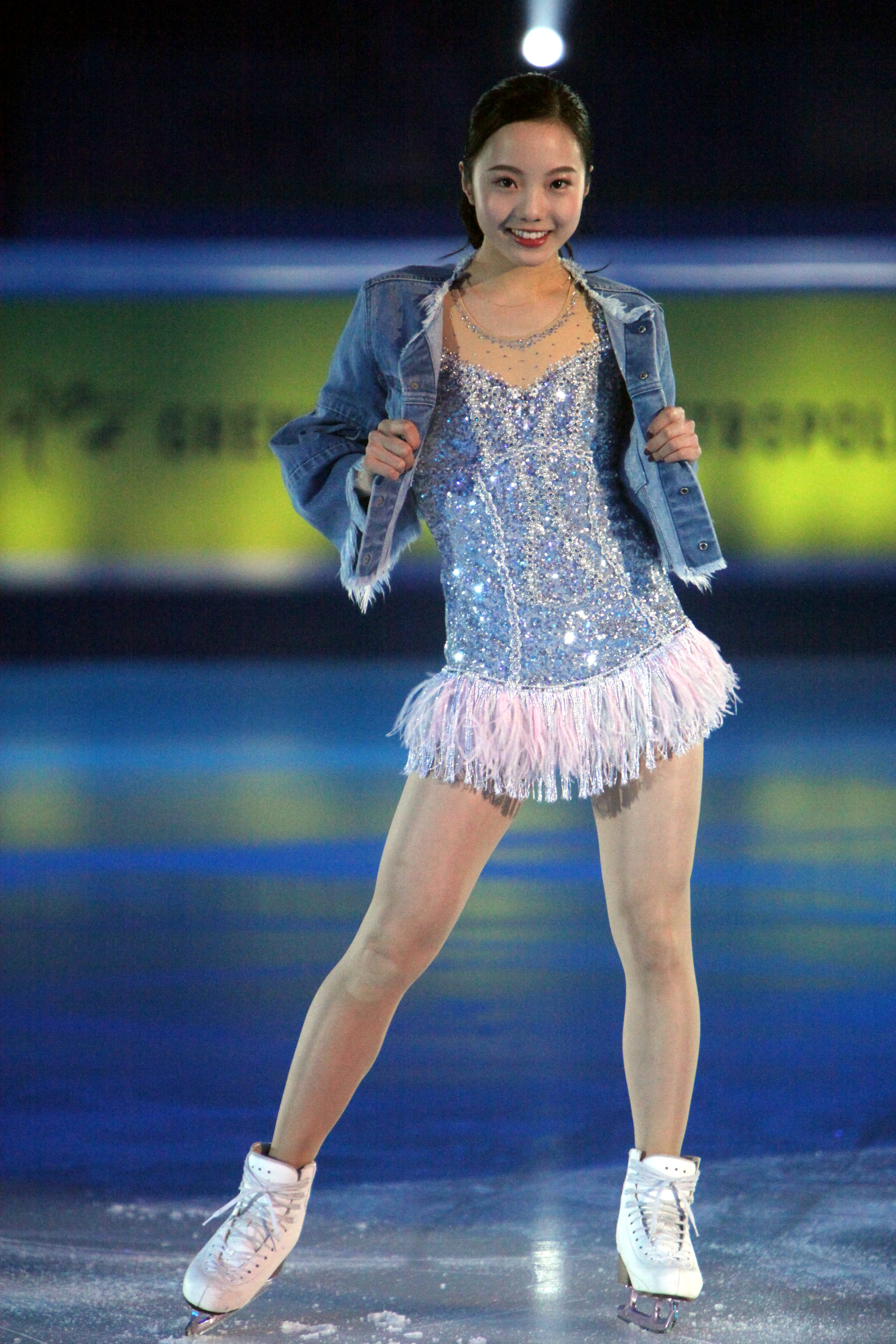
Honda at 2018 Internationaux de France

=== Women's singles ===
Competition and exhibition programs by season
Season	Short program	Free skate program	Exhibition program
2011–12	—N/a	"The Circus": 1. Il tema della fatta; From Pinocchio; Composed by Nicola Piovani; 2. Suite dal balletto; From La Strada; Composed by Nino Rota; Performed by Riccardo Muti & Filarmonica della Scala	—N/a
2012–2013	—N/a	"The Circus"	"Vertigogo": Performed by Combustible Edison
2013–2014	"Tico-Tico": Composed by Don Swan & His Orchestra	"Para Elisa": Composed by Ludwig van Beethoven; Performed by The Cocktail Lounge Players	"Vertigogo"
2014–2015	"Charleston": From Billion Dollar Baby; Composed by Morton Gould; Choreo. by Tom Dickson	Madama Butterfly: 1. Act II, Part II; Performed by Andre Kostelanetz & His Orchestra; 2. Un bel dì, vedremo; Performed by John Bayless; Composed by Giacomo Puccini; Choreo. by Mihoko Higuchi	"Madama Butterfly"
2014–2015	"Charleston": From Billion Dollar Baby; Composed by Morton Gould; Choreo. by Tom Dickson	Madama Butterfly: 1. Act II, Part II; Performed by Andre Kostelanetz & His Orchestra; 2. Un bel dì, vedremo; Performed by John Bayless; Composed by Giacomo Puccini; Choreo. by Mihoko Higuchi	"These Boots Are Made for Walkin'": Performed by Lee Hazlewood; Choreo. by Jamie Isley
2015–2016	"Spring Sonata": Composed by Ludwig van Beethoven; Choreo. by Marina Zueva	"Tim Burton Medley": 1. The Incantation; Performed by Vanessa-Mae; 2. Nessun dorma; Performed by Paul Potts; 3. The Book! / Obituaries; From Beetlejuice; 4. Victor's Piano Solo; From Corpse Bride; 5. Main Titles (Beetlejuice); From Beetlejuice; Composed by Danny Elfman; Choreo. by Mihoko Higuchi	"These Boots Are Made for Walkin'"
2015–2016	"Spring Sonata": Composed by Ludwig van Beethoven; Choreo. by Marina Zueva	"Tim Burton Medley": 1. The Incantation; Performed by Vanessa-Mae; 2. Nessun dorma; Performed by Paul Potts; 3. The Book! / Obituaries; From Beetlejuice; 4. Victor's Piano Solo; From Corpse Bride; 5. Main Titles (Beetlejuice); From Beetlejuice; Composed by Danny Elfman; Choreo. by Mihoko Higuchi	"That's Not My Name": Performed by The Ting Tings
2016–2017	"Smile": Composed by Charlie Chaplin; Performed by Nana Mouskouri; Choreo. by Marina Zueva	"Romeo and Juliet": 1. Love Theme; From Romeo and Juliet; Composed by Nino Rota; Performed by Boston Pops & Arthur Fiedler; 2. Kissing You; Performed by Des'ree; 3. O Verona; From Romeo + Juliet; Composed by Craig Armstrong; Performed by City of Prague Philharmonic Orchestra; Choreo. by Jeffrey Buttle	"Flashdance... What a Feeling": Performed by Irene Cara; Choreo. by Cathy Reed
2016–2017	"Smile": Composed by Charlie Chaplin; Performed by Nana Mouskouri; Choreo. by Marina Zueva	"Romeo and Juliet": 1. Love Theme; From Romeo and Juliet; Composed by Nino Rota; Performed by Boston Pops & Arthur Fiedler; 2. Kissing You; Performed by Des'ree; 3. O Verona; From Romeo + Juliet; Composed by Craig Armstrong; Performed by City of Prague Philharmonic Orchestra; Choreo. by Jeffrey Buttle	"Spring Sonata"
2017–2018	"Smile"	Turandot: 1. Popolo di Pekino! – Indietro cani!; Performed by Jussi Björling & Teatro dell'Opera di Roma; 2. Violin Fantasy on Puccini’s ‘Turandot’; Performed by Vanessa-Mae, Victor Fedotov, & Orchestra of the Royal Opera House; 3. Nessun dorma; Performed by Sarah Brightman; Composed by Giacomo Puccini; Choreo. by David Wilson	"I Really Like You": Composed by Carly Rae Jepsen; Choreo. by Marin Honda
2017–2018	"Smile"	Turandot: 1. Popolo di Pekino! – Indietro cani!; Performed by Jussi Björling & Teatro dell'Opera di Roma; 2. Violin Fantasy on Puccini’s ‘Turandot’; Performed by Vanessa-Mae, Victor Fedotov, & Orchestra of the Royal Opera House; 3. Nessun dorma; Performed by Sarah Brightman; Composed by Giacomo Puccini; Choreo. by David Wilson	"The Giving"
2017–2018	"The Giving": Composed by Michael W. Smith; Choreo. by Marina Zueva	—N/a	"Tango Medley": Choreo. by Jeffrey Buttle
2017–2018	"The Giving": Composed by Michael W. Smith; Choreo. by Marina Zueva	—N/a	"Crime Tale": Performed by Dimie Cat; Choreo. by Catarina Lindgren
2018–2019	"Seven Nation Army": Performed by Haley Reinhart for Scott Bradlee's Postmodern Jukebox; Choreo. by Shae-Lynn Bourne	"Lovers": From House of Flying Daggers; Composed by Shigeru Umebayashi; Performed by Kathleen Battle; Choreo. by Lori Nichol	"I Really Like You"
2019–2020	"Seven Nation Army"	La La Land: 1. Planetarium; Performed by Emma Stone, Callie Hernandez, Sonoya Mizuno, & Jessica Rothe; 2. Someone In the Crowd; 3. Credits; Composed by Justin Hurwitz & Pasek and Paul; Choreo. by Lori Nichol	"I'm an Albatraoz": Performed by AronChupa; Choreo. by Shae-Lynn Bourne
2020–2021	"I'm an Albatraoz"	La La Land	"I'll Never Love Again"
2020–2021	"The Giving"	"I'll Never Love Again": From A Star Is Born; Performed by Lady Gaga; Choreo. by Stéphane Lambiel	—N/a
2021–2022	"Seven Nation Army"	"Lovers"	—N/a
2022–2023	"Assassin's Tango": From Mr. & Mrs Smith; Composed by John Powell; Choreo. by Lori Nichol	Moulin Rouge!: 1. Hindi Sad Diamonds; 2. One Day I'll Fly Away; Composed by Steve Sharples; Performed by Nicole Kidman; 3. Bolero (Closing Credits); Choreo. by Kenji Miyamoto	"Rich Man's Frug": From Sweet Charity; Composed by Cy Coleman & Dorothy Fields; Choreo. by Kenji Miyamoto
2023–2024	"Faded": Performed by Alan Walker ft. Iselin Solheim; Choreo. by Shae-Lynn Bourne	The Little Mermaid: 1. Part of Your World (Reprise); Performed by Halle Bailey; 2. Ariel Regains Her Voice; Composed by Alan Menken; 3. Part of Your World; Performed by Halle Bailey; Choreo. by Kenji Miyamoto	—N/a

== Competitive highlights ==
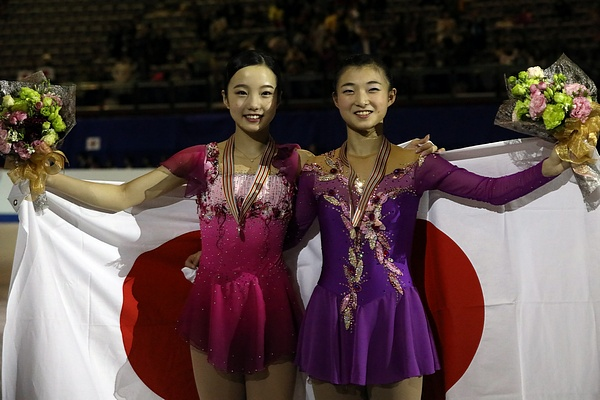
Honda (left) with teammate, bronze medalist Kaori Sakamoto, at the 2017 World Junior Championships podium

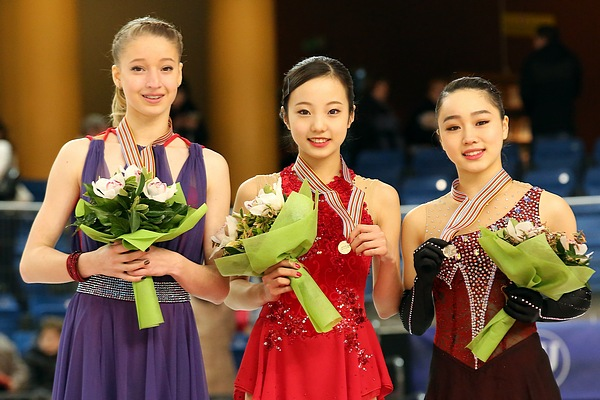
Honda (center) with Maria Sotskova (left) and Wakaba Higuchi (right) at the 2016 World Junior Championships podium

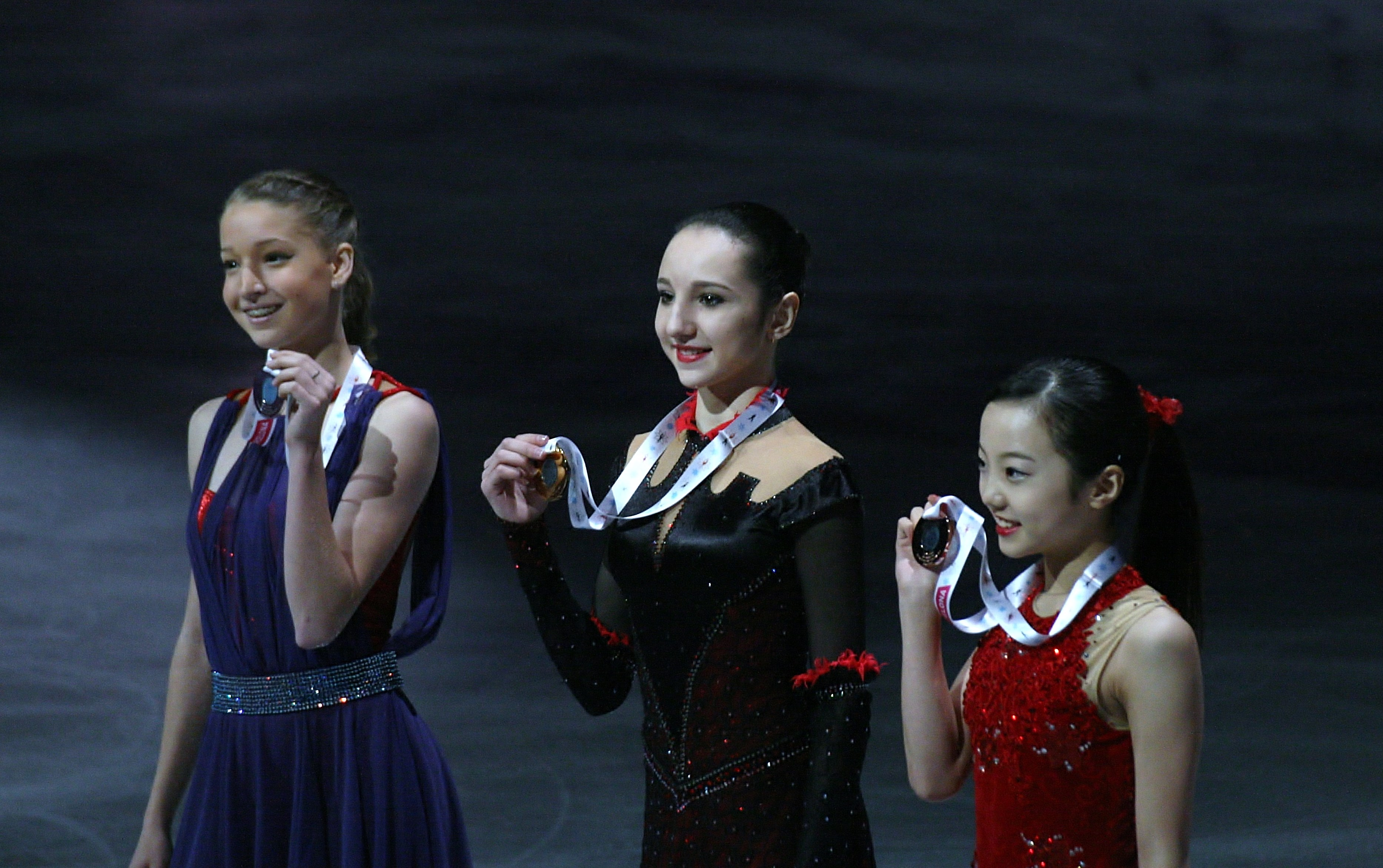
Honda (right) with Maria Sotskova (left) and Polina Tsurskaya (center) at the 2015–16 JGP Final podium

=== Women's singles ===
GP: Grand Prix; CS: Challenger Series; JGP: Junior Grand Prix

International
Event	11–12	12–13	13–14	14–15	15–16	16–17	17–18	18–19	19–20	20–21	21–22	22–23	23–24
GP Cup of China							5th		7th				
GP France								6th					
GP NHK Trophy										9th			
GP Skate America								8th					
GP Skate Canada							5th		6th				
CS Nebelhorn								6th	5th				
CS U.S. Classic							1st						
Bavarian Open									2nd				
Challenge Cup							3rd						
International: Junior
Junior Worlds					1st	2nd							
JGP Final					3rd	WD							
JGP Croatia					1st								
JGP Japan						2nd							
JGP Slovenia						2nd							
JGP U.S					2nd								
Asian Open					2nd	1st							
International: Advanced Novice
Asian Open			2nd	3rd									
Bavarian Open				1st									
Coupe Printemps			2nd										
Triglav Trophy		1st											
International: Basic Novice
Challenge Cup	1st												
National
Japan					9th	4th	7th	15th	8th	WD	21st	26th	28th
Japan Junior			5th	4th	6th	3rd							
Japan Novice	2nd B	1st B	3rd A	2nd A									
Japan Eastern Sect.										10th	5th	6th	5th
Japan Western Sect.					5th J	2nd J							
Kinki Reg.	1st B	1st B	1st A	1st A		2nd J							
Tokyo Reg.										7th	12th	8th	12th
Team events
Japan Open							2nd T 5th P			WD			
TBD = Assigned; WD = Withdrew; T = Team Result; P = Personal Result. Medals awarded for team result only Levels: A = Novice A; B = Novice B; J = Junior

== Detailed results ==
=== Women's singles ===
==== Senior level ====
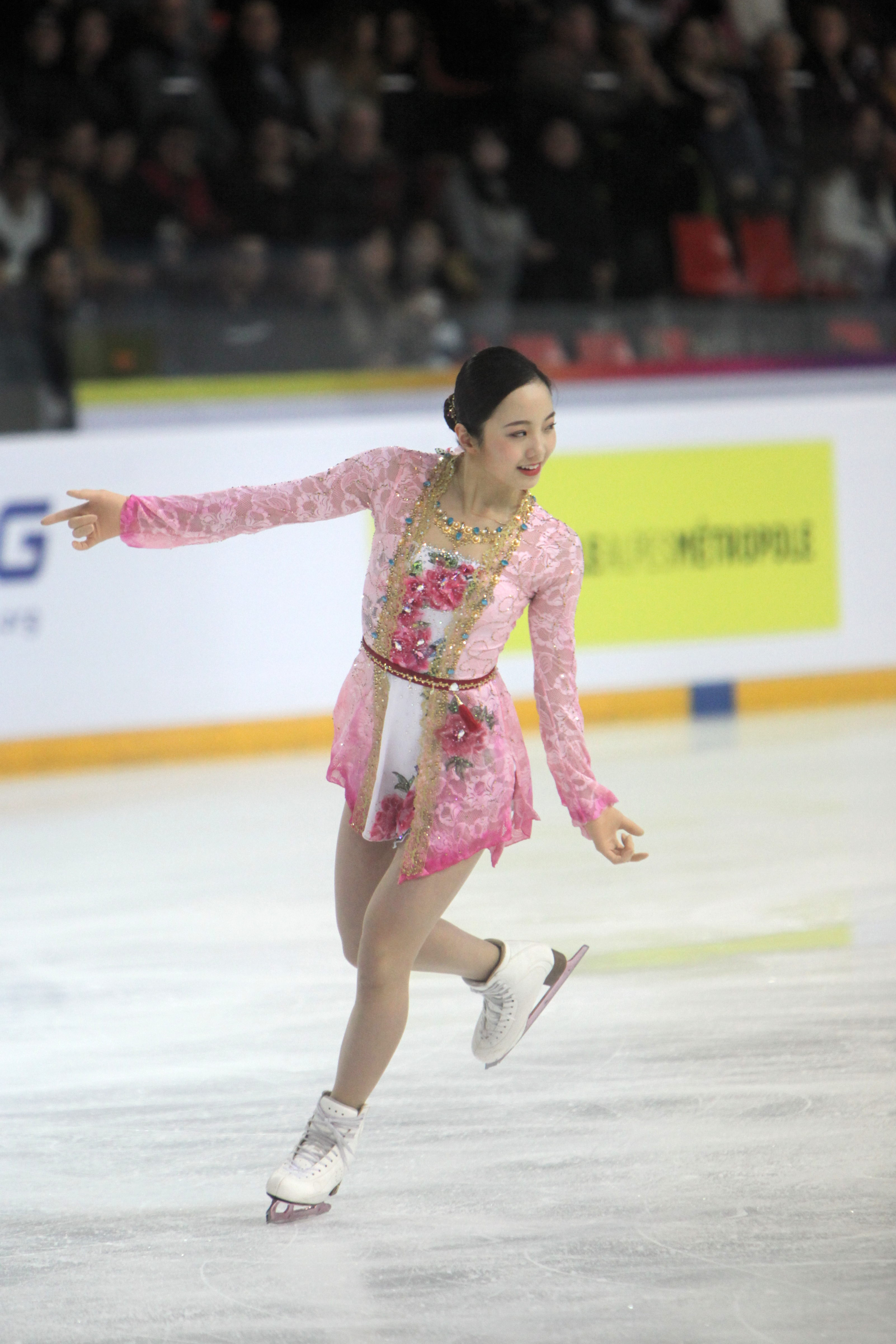
Honda at the 2018 Internationaux de France

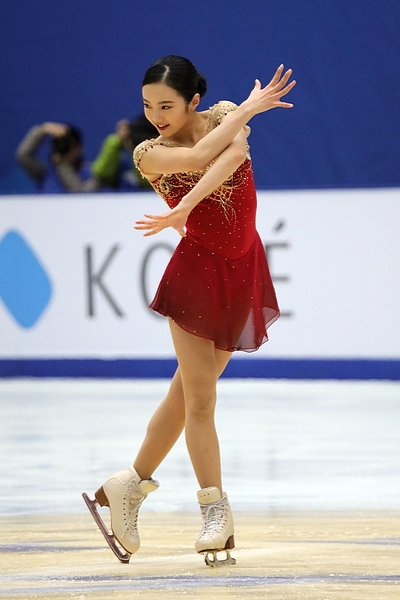
Honda at the 2017 Cup of China

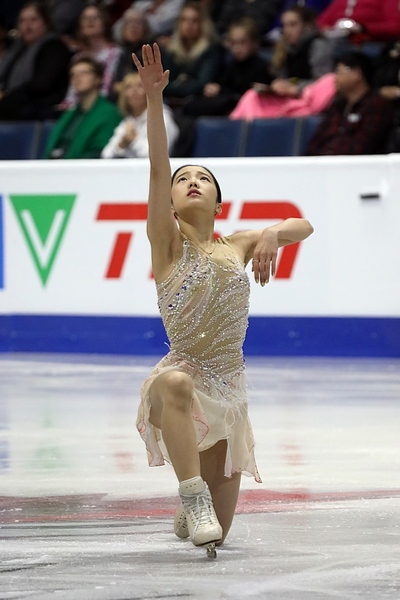
Honda at the 2017 Skate Canada International

At team events, medals are awarded for team results only. T – team result. P – personal/individual result.

2023–24 season
Date	Event	SP	FS	Total
December 20–24, 2023	2023–24 Japan Championships	28; 44.42	—	28; 44.42
2022–23 season
Date	Event	SP	FS	Total
December 21–25, 2022	2022–23 Japan Championships	26; 51.81	—	26; 51.81
2021–22 season
Date	Event	SP	FS	Total
December 22–26, 2021	2021–22 Japan Championships	23; 55.73	21; 100.80	21; 156.53
2020–21 season
Date	Event	SP	FS	Total
November 27–29, 2020	2020 NHK Trophy	9; 58.30	11; 104.27	9; 162.57
2019–20 season
Date	Event	SP	FS	Total
February 3–9, 2020	2020 Bavarian Open	2; 61.72	2; 116.52	2; 178.24
December 18–22, 2019	2019–20 Japan Championships	6; 65.92	8; 115.42	8; 181.34
November 8–10, 2019	2019 Cup of China	6; 61.73	7; 106.36	7; 168.09
October 25–27, 2019	2019 Skate Canada International	10; 59.20	6; 120.06	6; 179.26
September 25–28, 2019	2019 CS Nebelhorn Trophy	6; 58.08	5; 115.93	5; 174.01
2018–19 season
Date	Event	SP	FS	Total
December 20–24, 2018	2018–19 Japan Championships	18; 52.75	15; 111.48	15; 164.23
November 23–25, 2018	2018 Internationaux de France	4; 65.37	6; 123.24	6; 188.61
October 19–21, 2018	2018 Skate America	4; 62.74	9; 95.30	8; 158.04
September 26–29, 2018	2018 CS Nebelhorn Trophy	7; 56.66	4; 122.23	6; 178.89
2017–18 season
Date	Event	SP	FS	Total
February 22–25, 2018	2018 Challenge Cup	11; 48.21	2; 111.98	3; 160.19
December 21–24, 2017	2017–18 Japan Championships	6; 66.65	9; 126.72	7; 193.37
November 3–5, 2017	2017 Cup of China	6; 66.90	5; 131.42	5; 198.32
October 27–29, 2017	2017 Skate Canada International	10; 52.60	3; 125.64	5; 178.24
October 7, 2017	2017 Japan Open	-	5; 133.41	2T/5P
September 13–17, 2017	2017 U.S. Classic	1; 66.90	1; 131.52	1; 198.42

==== Junior level ====
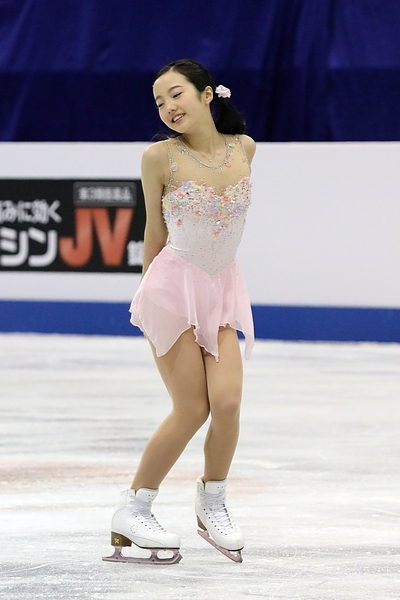
Honda at the 2017 World Junior Championships

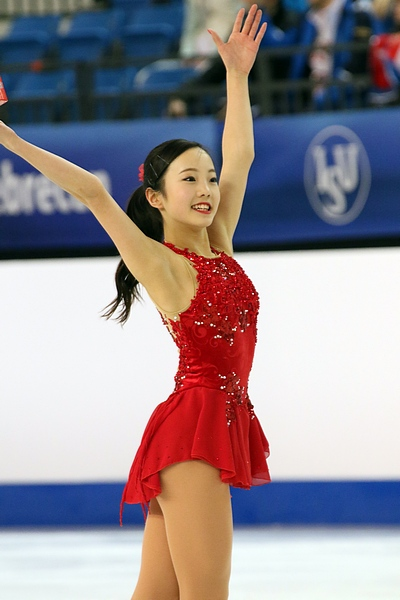
Honda at the 2016 World Junior Championships

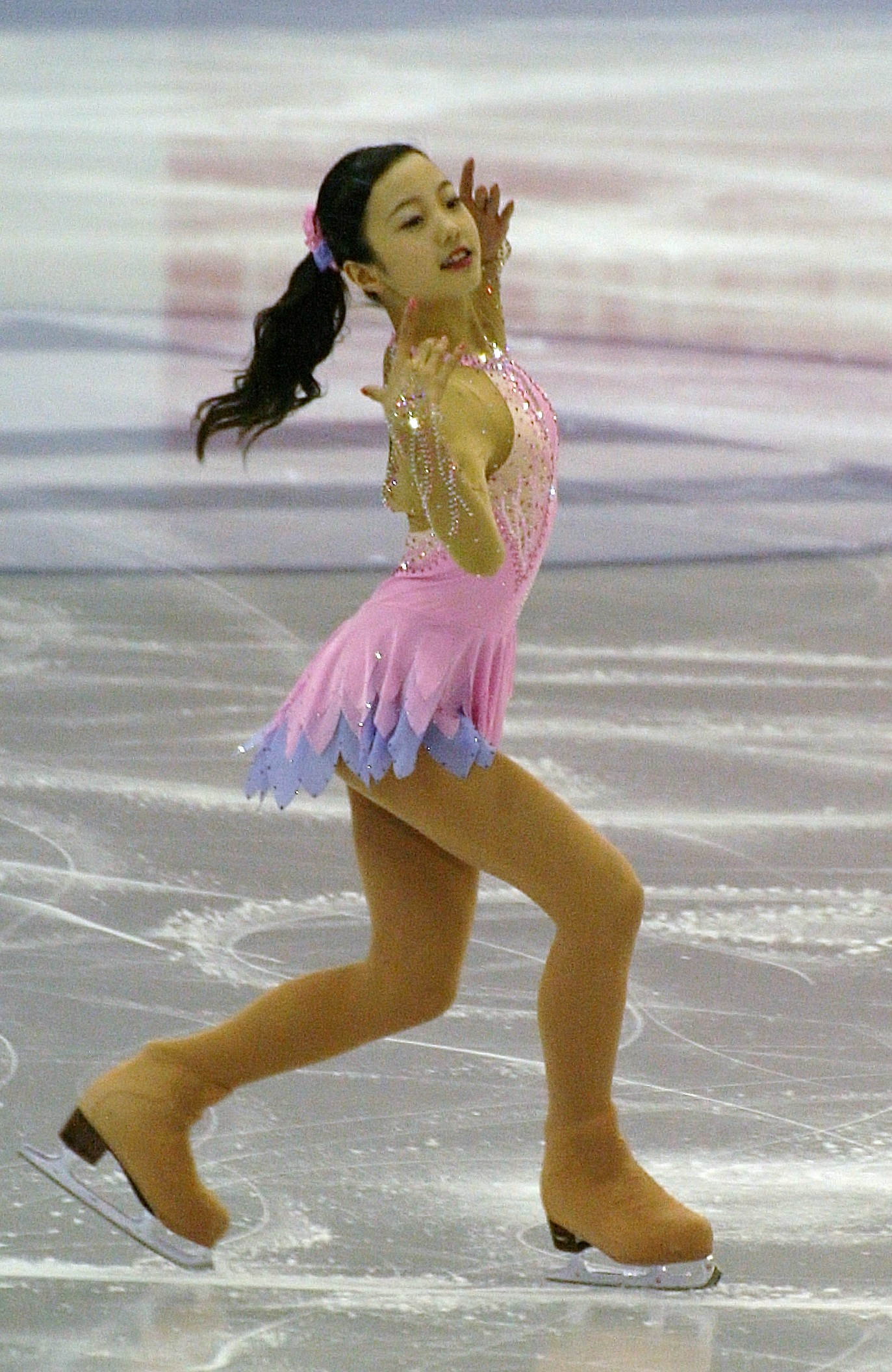
Honda at the 2015–16 Junior Grand Prix Final

Small medals for short and free programs awarded only at ISU Championships. Previous ISU world best highlighted in bold. ISU Personal best highlighted in bold.

2016–17 season
Date	Event	Level	SP	FS	Total
March 13–19, 2017	2017 World Junior Championships	Junior	2; **68.35**	2; **133.26**	2; **201.61**
December 22–25, 2016	2016–17 Japan Championships	Senior	4; 67.52	5; 128.59	4; 196.11
November 18–20, 2016	2016–17 Japan Junior Championships	Junior	2; 64.96	6; 111.37	3; 176.23
September 21–25, 2016	2016 JGP Slovenia	Junior	4; 57.79	2; 120.96	2; 178.75
September 7–11, 2016	2016 JGP Japan	Junior	5; 55.47	1; **128.64**	2; 184.11
August 4–7, 2016	2016 Asian Open Trophy	Junior	3; 57.26	1; 116.41	1; 173.67
2015–16 season
Date	Event	Level	SP	FS	Total
March 14–20, 2016	2016 World Junior Championships	Junior	2; 66.11	1; 126.87	1; 192.98
December 24–27, 2015	2015–16 Japan Championships	Senior	11; 58.23	9; 113.39	9; 171.62
December 10–13, 2015	2015–16 JGP Final	Junior	3; 63.69	3; 114.95	3; 178.64
November 21–23, 2015	2015–16 Japan Junior Championships	Junior	7; 54.65	5; 114.23	6; 168.88
October 7–10, 2015	2015 JGP Croatia	Junior	3; 57.92	1; 123.30	1; 181.22
September 2–5, 2015	2015 JGP United States	Junior	1; 61.05	4; 95.39	2; 156.44
August 2–5, 2015	2015 Asian Open Trophy	Junior	1; 48.47	3; 84.21	2; 132.68
2014–15 season
Date	Event	Level	SP	FS	Total
February 11–15, 2015	2015 Bavarian Open	Novice	1; 40.49	1; 81.23	1; 121.72
November 22–24, 2014	2014–15 Japan Junior Championships	Junior	7; 53.09	2; 114.83	4; 167.92
August 22–24, 2014	2014 Asian Open Trophy	Novice	4; 38.96	2; 87.18	3; 126.14
2013–14 season
Date	Event	Level	SP	FS	Total
March 14–16, 2014	2014 Coupe du Printemps	Novice	2; 34.34	1; 71.37	2; 105.71
November 22–24, 2013	2013–14 Japan Junior Championships	Junior	13; 45.81	2; 104.24	5; 150.05
August 8–11, 2013	2013 Asian Open Trophy	Novice	1; 36.92	2; 62.61	2; 99.53
2012–13 season
Date	Event	Level	SP	FS	Total
March 27–31, 2013	2013 Triglav Trophy	Novice	1; 42.73	1; 82.03	1; 124.76
2011–12 season
Date	Event	Level	SP	FS	Total
March 8–11, 2012	2012 International Challenge Cup	Debs	1; 32.77	1; 64.76	1; 97.53

== Filmography ==
- Re/Member: The Last Night (2025), Arisa Kinoshita

Historical World Junior Record Holders (before season 2018–19)
Preceded by (Russia) Polina Tsurskaya	Ladies' Junior Free Skating; September 11, 2016 – October 9, 2016	Succeeded by (Russia) Anastasiia Gubanova
