= Dan Zanes =

American musician (born 1961)

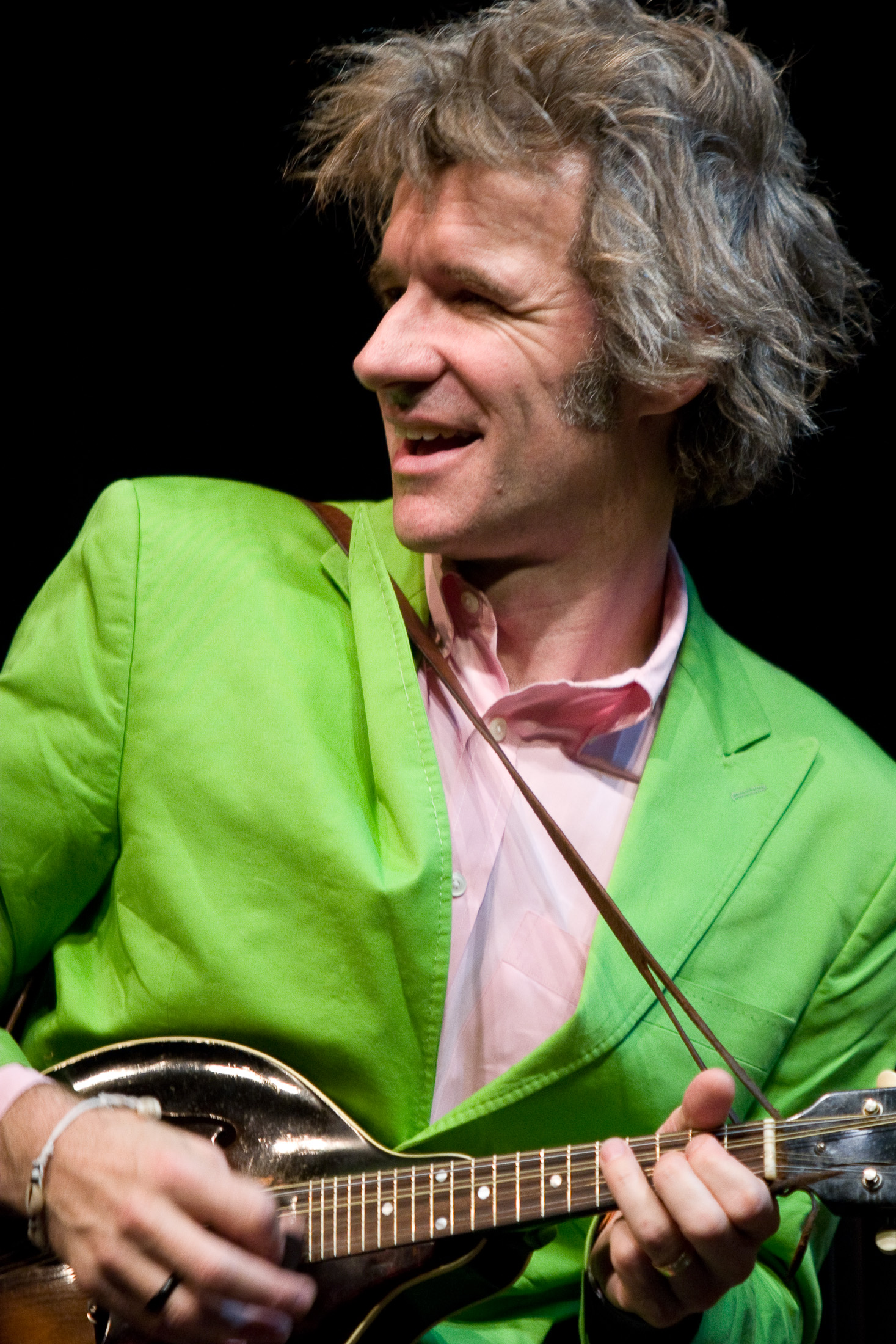
- Dan Zanes plays mandolin on stage in 2007.

Background information
- Born: Daniel Edgerly Zanes; November 8, 1961 (age 64); Exeter, New Hampshire, US
- Genres: Rock; garage rock; folk; roots rock; children's; sea shanties
- Occupations: Musician; singer-songwriter
- Instruments: Vocals; harmonica; guitar; banjo; mandolin
- Years active: 1980–present
- Label: Festival Five
- Formerly of: The Del Fuegos
- Website: www.danandclaudia.com

Daniel Edgerly Zanes (born November 8, 1961) is an American rock, folk, and children's musician. He was a member of the 1980s band the Del Fuegos, the frontman of the group Dan Zanes and Friends, and currently performs with his wife, Claudia Eliaza Zanes, as Dan + Claudia.

== Early life and education ==
Zanes's father was a teacher, as well as a poet and writer. He is brother to fellow musician and former bandmate Warren Zanes.

Zanes grew up in New Hampshire. He became interested in music as a young child, and recalls being introduced to the music of American folk musician Lead Belly at age seven, after getting his first library card. Other early music inspiration included Woody Guthrie, Ella Jenkins, and Pete Seeger. He attended Phillips Academy in Andover, Massachusetts for two years.

Zanes attended Oberlin College, where he met bandmate Tom Lloyd.

== The Del Fuegos ==
The Del Fuegos played in lofts, bars, warehouses, small art galleries, clubs, barns, college dining halls, fraternity houses, gymnasiums, auditoriums, and, finally, big theaters.

Rolling Stone named the Del Fuegos "Best New Band" in 1984. With the Del Fuegos, Zanes made several records – The Longest Day (1984), Boston, Mass. (1985), Stand Up (1987), Smoking in the Fields (1989) – and had a hit single, "Don't Run Wild" .

== Family music ==
After Zanes, his wife at the time, Paula Greif, and their young daughter moved to New York City, Zanes began playing music with a group of other fathers that he had met in West Village playgrounds. This informal group became the Wonderland String Band, which played at parks and parties and recorded a tape of songs at Zanes' home.

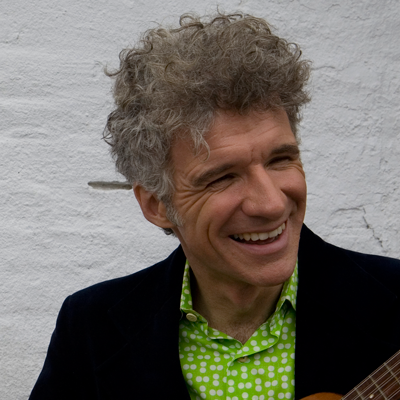
Dan Zanes

The tape was a hit locally – i.e. on the playgrounds where he and his daughter played – and Zanes realized that he liked making music that families could enjoy together, as opposed to music that is just for children or just for adults. So, he added a small number of women to his band, renamed it the Rocket Ship Revue, and began making a full-length homemade album, enlisting the help of some people he had met when he was a Del Fuego – Sheryl Crow, Suzanne Vega, and Simon Kirke, the drummer for Bad Company.

The album, Rocket Ship Beach (2000), was also a hit. The New York Times Magazine called it "cool", and added, "Mostly, though, Zanes' kids music works because it is not kids music; it's just music – music that's unsanitized, unpasteurized, that's organic even." Sheryl Crow and Suzanne Vega made guest appearances on the album.

In 2000, he founded the group Dan Zanes and Friends and launched the record label Festival Five Records. As noted by Variety in 2004, "what makes Zanes and Friends such a treasure is that they exist outside the corporate structure. There’s no attempt to cross-promote or create a consumer. All that matters is having fun".

The second album, Family Dance (2001) is composed of dance songs from a wide variety of musical traditions and features Loudon Wainwright III and Rosanne Cash. The third recording, the more mellow Night Time! (2002), features collaborations with Aimee Mann, Lou Reed, John Doe, Dar Williams, and other established musicians.

In 2003, he played himself on Dragon Tales Let's Start a Band on TV film. The fourth album in the family series is House Party (2003), a rambunctious 20-song collection with a diverse instrumentation that, in addition to the usual guitars, banjos, upright bass and drums, includes such instruments as violin, tuba, accordion, trombone, pump organ, djembe and saw. House Party was nominated for a Grammy in the Musical Album for Children category. Music video selections from the House Party album played during the Disney Channel's morning program suite known as Playhouse Disney from 2005 to 2007. New music video selections occasionally played on Nickelodeon's Noggin.

In 2007, Zanes received the Grammy Award for Best Musical Album for Children for Catch That Train! (2006) and produced a children's reggae CD with Father Goose called "Its a Bam Bam Diddly", which also features songs performed by Sister Carol and Sheryl Crow.

His seventh album 76 Trombones (2009) was a Broadway/Showtune themed album, featuring guest vocalists Matthew Broderick, Carol Channing, and Brian Stokes Mitchell.

In 2017, Zanes released Lead Belly, Baby!, a cover album of Lead Belly's music, through Smithsonian Folkways in cooperation with the Lead Belly estate. Other contributing artists to the album included Billy Bragg, Chuck D, Aloe Blacc, Valerie June, Memphis Jelks, Tamar-kali, and Sonia de los Santos. In October of that year, he and Claudia Eliaza premiered Night Train 57, a "sensory-friendly 'folk opera'" commissioned by the Kennedy Center.

Since 2021, Zanes has performed with his wife, Claudia Eliaza Zanes, as Dan + Claudia. The couple have released two albums together: Let Love Be Your Guide (2021) and Pieces of Home (2024).

== Personal life ==
In 1987, Zanes married Paula Greif, the director of the video for the Del Fuegos song, I Still Want You. After the dissolution of The Del Fuegos, the couple moved to "a small town in the Catskill Mountains". The couple had one daughter, born in 1994.

Zanes has spoken on the importance of white people knowing about and working to deconstruct systemic racism. In 2011, Zanes co-founded Constructive White Conversations, an antiracist organization focused on white people.

In 2016, Zanes met Claudia Eliaza; the two married in 2018. In 2019, the couple moved from Brooklyn to Baltimore. The couple are Christians, and currently are members of a Black Baptist church in Baltimore.

== Discography ==
=== With the Del Fuegos ===
- The Longest Day (1984)
- Boston, Mass. (1985)
- Spin Radio Concert (1985)
- Stand Up (1987)
- Smoking in the Fields (1989)
- Silver Star (2012)

=== Solo ===
- Cool Down Time (1995)

=== Family music albums ===
- Rocket Ship Beach (2000)
- Family Dance (2001)
- Night Time! (2002)
- House Party (2003)
- All Around the Kitchen! (2005)
- Catch That Train! (2006)
- The Welcome Table (2008)
- ¡Nueva York! (2008)
- 76 Trombones (2009)
- The Fine Friends Are Here! (2009)
- Little Nut Tree (2011)
- Turn Turn Turn (2013) with Elizabeth Mitchell
- Get Loose and Get Together!: The Best of Dan Zanes (2014)
- Lead Belly, Baby! (2017), Smithsonian Folkways
- Night Train 57 (2018) with Claudia Eliaza and Yuriana Sobrino

=== Traditional music albums ===
- Sea Music (2003)
  - including "Oh Shenandoah", "Sloop John B", "The John B. Sails", and "Deep Blue Sea"
- Parades and Panoramas: 25 Songs Collected by Carl Sandburg for the American Songbag (2004)
  - including "The Midnight Train", "Hallelujah, I'm a Bum", and "Lord Lovel"

=== With Claudia Eliaza Zanes ===
- Let Love Be Your Guide (2021), Smithsonian Folkways
- Pieces of Home (2024), Smithsonian Folkways

=== Singles ===
- 2001: Hello
- 2002: Smile Smile Smile
- 2003: All Around the Kitchen
- 2006: Catch That Train!

== Awards ==
Year	Award	Category	Album	Result	Ref
2005	Grammy Awards	Best Musical Album for Children	House Party (2003)	Nominated	
2007	Grammy Awards	Best Musical Album for Children	Catch That Train! (2006)	Won	
2009	8th Annual Independent Music Awards	Best Children's Music Album	¡Nueva York! (2008)	Won	

== Filmography ==
- 2003 — Let's Start a Band: A Dragon Tales Music Special
- 2008 – Revolutionary Road
- 2009 – Wonderful World – Sweeny
