= Four Rooms (soundtrack) =

1995 soundtrack album

Four Rooms (Original Motion Picture Soundtrack)

Film score by Combustible Edison
- Released: September 26, 1995
- Genre: Lounge; soundtrack
- Length: 49:20
- Label: Elektra; Asylum
- Producer: Mark Mothersbaugh; Carl Plaster; Combustible Edison; Quentin Tarantino

Combustible Edison chronology
I, Swinger (1994)	Four Rooms (Original Motion Picture Soundtrack) (1995)	Schizophonic! (1996)

Professional ratings
Review scores
Source	Rating
AllMusic	4.5/5 stars

Four Rooms (Original Motion Picture Soundtrack) is a soundtrack by Combustible Edison for Allison Anders, Alexandre Rockwell, Robert Rodriguez, and Quentin Tarantino's anthology film of the same name.

The score was released by Elektra and Asylum Records in digital formats on September 26, 1995, 3 months prior to the film's release on December 25, 1995.

== Development ==
The score for Four Rooms (1995) was composed and performed by contemporary lounge music band Combustible Edison, with additional music by Juan García Esquivel and Mark Mothersbaugh. The recording of Combustible Edison's second studio album Schizophonic! (1996) was delayed by more than a year in order for them to work on the Four Rooms soundtrack.

== Track listing ==
No.	Title	Contributing artist	Length
1.	"Vertigogo (Opening Theme)"	Combustible Edison	2:35
2.	"Junglero"	Combustible Edison	1:54
3.	"Four Rooms Swing"	Combustible Edison	2:11
4.	"Theme from Bewitched"	Howard Greenfield and Jack Keller	1:01
5.	"Tea and Eva in the Elevator"	Combustible Edison	0:55
6.	"Invocation"	Combustible Edison	1:26
7.	"Breakfast at Denny's"	Combustible Edison	3:57
8.	"Strange Brew"	Combustible Edison	0:27
9.	"Coven of Witches"	Combustible Edison	0:59
10.	"The Earthly Diana"	Combustible Edison	0:36
11.	"Eva Seduces Ted"	Combustible Edison	2:10
12.	"Hallway Ted"	Combustible Edison	0:31
13.	"Headshake Rhumba"	Combustible Edison	0:41
14.	"Skippen, Pukin, Siegfried"	Combustible Edison	0:29
15.	"Angela"	Combustible Edison	0:46
16.	"Punch Drunk"	Combustible Edison	2:57
17.	"Male Bonding"	Combustible Edison	3:06
18.	"Mariachi"	Combustible Edison	0:29
19.	"Antes De Medianoche"	Combustible Edison	2:45
20.	"Sentimental Journey"	Bud Green, Les Brown, and Ben Homer (written by), Esquivel (performed by)	2:39
21.	"Kids Watch TV"	Combustible Edison	2:03
22.	"Champagne and Needles"	Combustible Edison	2:06
23.	"Bullseye"	Combustible Edison	1:01
24.	"Harlem Nocturne"	Earle Hagen (written by), Esquivel (performed by)	2:30
25.	"The Millionaire's Holiday"	Combustible Edison	2:13
26.	"Ted-o-vater"	Combustible Edison	0:39
27.	"Vertigogo (Closing Credits)"	Combustible Edison	5:33
28.	"'D' In The Hallway Credits"	Combustible Edison	0:25
29.	"Torchy"	Combustible Edison	0:16
Total length:			49:20

== Personnel ==
- Combustible Edison – Band, Composer, Performer, Primary Artist, Producer
- Ben Homer – Composer
- Bud Green – Composer
- Earle H. Hagen – Composer
- Les Brown – Composer
- Allison Anders – Executive Producer
- Quentin Tarantino – Executive Producer
- Robert Rodriguez – Executive Producer
- Lawrence Bender – Executive Producer

== Academy Awards disqualification ==
"Vertigogo", the film's main theme, was submitted for consideration for an Academy Award, but was ultimately disqualified from consideration because of its incomprehensible lyrical content, despite the fact that Combustible Edison submitted a lyric sheet with their best written approximation of the lyrics.
