= Corndaddy =

Americana/alt-country band

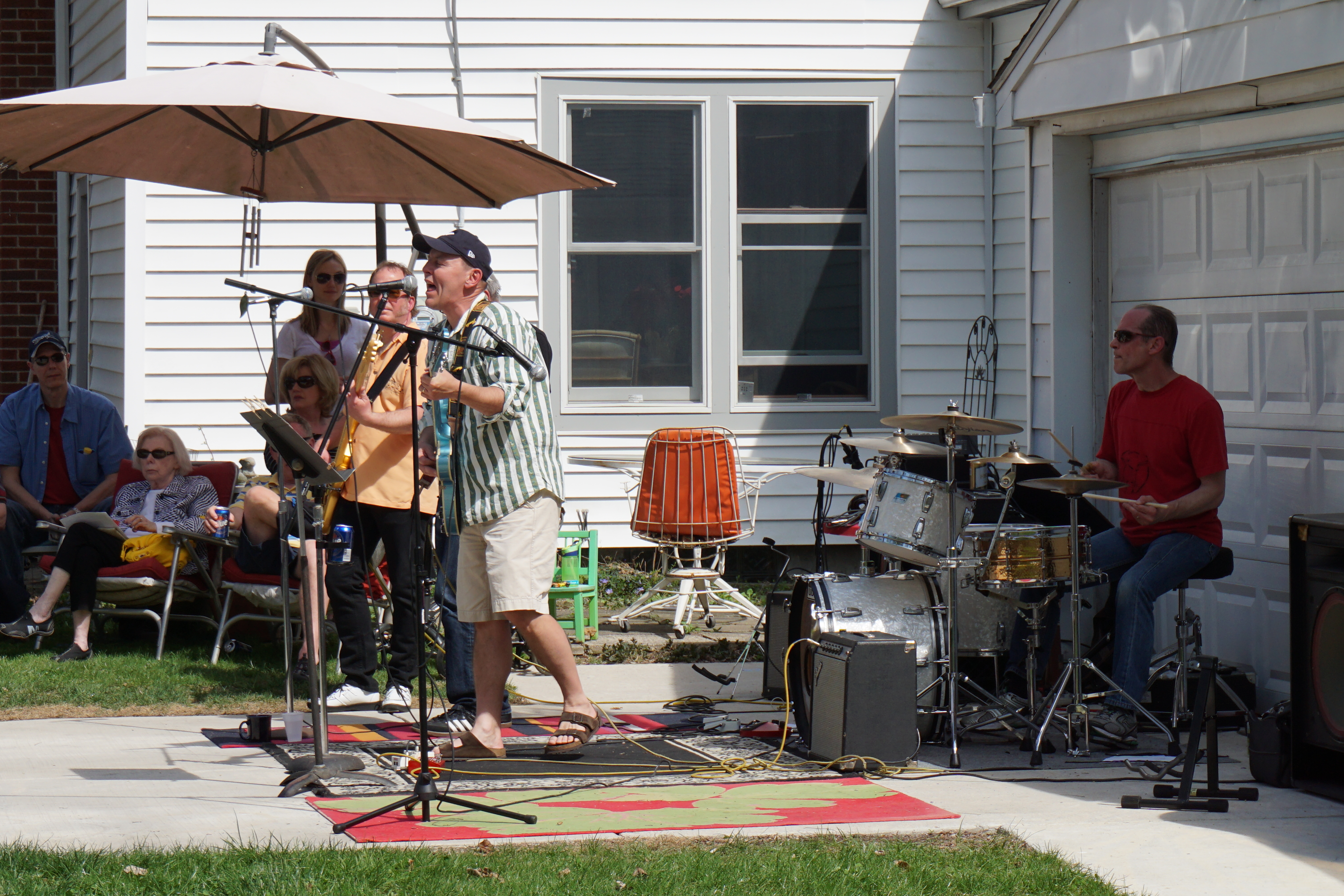
Corndaddy performing at the 2015 Water Hill Music Fest in Ann Arbor

Corndaddy is an Americana/alt-country band based in Ann Arbor, Michigan. The band is also influenced by power pop and rock and roll.

== History ==
Lead guitarist Kevin Brown, a devotee of country rock legends Gram Parsons and Clarence White, played in a number of Michigan country-rock bands in the 1970s, '80s and '90s. In 1998, he met up with guitarist and singer Jud Branam. Branam, then a journalist at the Ann Arbor News, had been learning guitar along with coworkers Mark Whitney and Will Stewart, who would join the newly formed Corndaddy as a drummer along with bassist Jerry Hancock. The band was originally named "Slackjaw", after the Simpsons song "Cletus the Slack-Jawed Yokel," but they changed the name since another band had already used it.

The group released a self-titled debut album in 2000, with a follow-up, Better Days, released in 2002. The band continued to play live during the next decade and raised $3,551 via Kickstarter to release a third album, Heart of the Matter, in 2013.

Corndaddy has opened for notable bands including the V-Roys and Mike Ireland and Holler. Musician and record executive Don Was, of Was Not Was, played their version of the Carter Family's "No Depression" on his Sirius satellite radio show. Stewart left the band in 2010 to focus on his work in the Ypsitucky Colonels and was replaced as drummer by Hugh Huntley.

== Artistry ==
The band was influenced by rock, alternative, and Americana groups such as The Byrds, Uncle Tupelo, The Jayhawks, The Beat Farmers, Green on Red, The Del Fuegos, and R.E.M.

Mark Deming of All Music Guide described the band's influences as "country-influenced twang, a power pop band's love of hooks, and a rocker's passion for the backbeat," comparing Brown's guitar playing to that of The Byrds' Roger McGuinn. Brian McCollum of Detroit Free Press compared the band's "refreshingly uncluttered country rock" to The Jayhawks.

== Discography ==
- Corndaddy (2000)
- Better Days (2002)
- Heart of the Matter (2013)
