= Burbuja =

Burbuja (Spanish "bubble") or Burbujas may refer to:

== Music ==
- Burbujas, Mexican album for kids released in 1979
- "Burbujas", tango by Astor Piazzolla
- "Burbuja", song by Si*Sé from Si*Sé
- "Burbuja", song by David Bisbal from Tú y Yo

== Other ==
- Burbuja, 1967 TV series with Juan Carlos Altavista
- Burbujas, 2009 comic book by Daniel Torres

== See also ==
- "Burbujas de Amor" ("Bubbles of Love") by Juan Luis Guerra 1990
