= Mudhead =

Mudhead may refer to:

- "Mudhead", a song by Combustible Edison from their 1996 album Schizophonic!
- "Mudhead", a song by The Supersuckers from their 1994 album La Mano Cornuda
- snake mudhead, a type of fish
- Mudhead (Tatsiqto), a Pueblo clown figure
- Mudhead, a free-spirited character in Firesign Theatre's 1970 album, Don't Crush That Dwarf, Hand Me the Pliers
