= Brother Cleve =

American musician, DJ and mixologist

- Born: Robert Francis Toomey; February 2, 1955
- Died: September 9, 2022 (aged 67); Los Angeles, California, U.S.
- Occupations: Musician; DJ; mixologist
- Years active: 1975–2022
- Spouse: Diane Dodge

Robert Toomey (February 2, 1955 – September 9, 2022), publicly known as Brother Cleve, was an American musician, DJ, record producer, mixologist, and writer. Known as the godfather of the local bar and cocktail scenes in Boston, Massachusetts, Cleve grew up in nearby Medford.

His "Brother Cleve" moniker originated as a personality he created for Sports Palace, a weekend program on college radio station WMBR in Cambridge; he also utilized the name in live appearances and recordings for the Church of the SubGenius, a parody religion.

== Music ==
Toomey played piano, organ, accordion, vibraphone, and a variety of electronic keyboards. He was adept at sampling and multi-track remixing as well.

In the 1980s Cleve was a touring keyboardist for the rock band the Del Fuegos, during which time he developed an interest in cocktails and bartending. Around this time he also served as touring keyboardist for R&B shouter Barrence Whitfield and the Savages, and appears on their 1994 album Ritual of the Savages.

In the 1990s, Cleve was hired as touring keyboardist for the neo-lounge band Combustible Edison, before becoming a full band member. He appears on their 1998 album The Impossible World, issued on Sub Pop. Combustible Edison's style was centered around a 1950s Exotica aesthetic, and they had a namesake cocktail, made from brandy, Campari, and lemon juice, which they mixed onstage during sets.

Toomey performed and recorded with numerous other artists, including The I-Tones, The Swingin' Love Corpses, Wheelers & Dealers, Huge Voodoo, Dragonfly, and The Singhs, covering a variety of styles, including reggae, country, exotica, Bollywood, and R&B. He also recorded original material under the name Brother Cleve & His Lush Orchestra.

In the late 1990s, Cleve befriended, visited, and worked with the legendary Mexican-American bandleader Juan Garcia Esquivel, who was elderly, bedridden, and retired in Mexico. In 1996 Cleve recorded Esquivel's voice and mixed them into two new recordings, with music by Brother Cleve's Lush Orchestra (which included The Millionaire and Miss Lily Banquette of Combustible Edison). The tracks, "Jingle Bells (Greetings From Esquivel!)" and "Auld Lang Syne (Adios From Esquivel!)" were issued on the full-length Esquivel holiday album Merry Xmas From The Space-Age Bachelor Pad (Bar/None Records), which was compiled by Cleve.

In 2004, he contributed "Bwana Bwana (Br. Cleve's Bongo Congo Mix)" to the compilation album Adulterated - The Remix Project (Taboo Records). The following year he contributed "School 4 Robots" to the compilation album, Dimension Mix: A Tribute To Dimension 5 Records - The Music Of Bruce Haack and Esther Nelson. In 2006 he remixed Esquivel's recording of "Pecado Mortal" for the compilation album Esquivel! Remixed (SonyBMG Music). In 2010 he produced the album The Unforgettable Sounds of Esquivel, by Mr. Ho's Orchestrotica.

Cleve was an authority on Bollywood music and films. In a 2007 essay for The Brooklyn Rail, he explored the history of horror films in India.

In 2018 Cleve co-produced (with Irwin Chusid) Barrence Whitfield & the Soul Savage Arkestra: Songs from the Sun Ra Cosmos, featuring new takes on the repertoire of the noted Afrofuturist musician-composer-bandleader Sun Ra. The album was issued in 2019 on the Modern Harmonic label. Cleve played keyboards on and arranged several tracks, and helped mix the album. In 2017 he mixed (with Sean Slade) unreleased 24-track 1986 Sun Ra session tapes for the album Inside the Light World, issued on Strut in 2024.

== Cocktail culture ==
While touring with the Del Fuegos, "One day in the mid-1980s, at a diner in Cleveland, [Toomey] noticed scores of cocktails listed on the menu," wrote James R. Hagerty in a September 2022 Wall Street Journal obituary. "He began searching thrift shops for cocktail-recipe books and learned to mix and tweak classic drinks." "Drinking cocktails was the most punk-rock thing you could do in the '80s, because nobody did it," Toomey explained. "Doing all these old-school cocktails was an act of defiance against society."

Cleve began bartending at Hoodoo Barbecue near Fenway Park, and was a DJ on weekly lounge nights at the Lizard Lounge in Cambridge. In 1998, he helped open Cambridge's B-Side Lounge. The Boston Globe once referred to him as "The Lounge King of Boston." Toomey specialized in pairing cocktails with music. At a Boston bar, he blended daiquiris with Cuban jazz and 1970s cocktails with disco.

In 2007, Toomey was diagnosed with tuberculosis and had to give up drinking. While recovering, he focused on his work as a club and party DJ and as a musician. Once he had made a full recovery, he was able to refocus his attention on cocktail culture.

In 2022, Cleve co-established Lullaby, a cocktail bar on the Lower East Side of Manhattan.

== Death ==
Cleve died of a heart attack on September 9, 2022, while visiting Los Angeles for a tiki-themed bartending event.
