= Smoking in the Fields =

Studio album by the Del Fuegos
- Released: 1989
- Genre: Rock
- Label: RCA
- Producer: Dave Thoener

The Del Fuegos chronology
| Stand Up (1987) | Smoking in the Fields (1989) | Silver Star EP (2012) |

Smoking in the Fields is an album by the American band the Del Fuegos, released in 1989. It was the band's final studio album.

The album peaked at No. 139 on the Billboard 200. Its first single was "Move with Me Sister". The Del Fuegos supported the album by touring with James McMurtry.

== Production ==
Smoking in the Fields was produced by Dave Thoener. It was made without original members Woody Giessmann and Warren Zanes, who had left the band. Magic Dick and Rick Danko made guest appearances. The album was recorded in Woodstock, New York, from a pool of around 30 songs.

== Critical reception ==
Professional ratings
Review scores
| Source | Rating |
|---|---|
| AllMusic | 3/5 stars |
| Robert Christgau | C+ |
| The Encyclopedia of Popular Music | 3/5 stars |
| MusicHound Rock: The Essential Album Guide | 1/5 stars |

Trouser Press wrote: "Secret weapon harp demon Magic Dick ... sends out waves of soulful moaning on some of the songs as horns and tasteful strings gussy up others; the lively variety show of smoking R&B, Stonesy guitar rock, rugged pop and whiskey-scarred soul ... scores on all four fronts." Robert Christgau deemed the album "clubland nostalgia." The Los Angeles Times determined that "the raw rock attack of the band's early days is back," and labeled the album "their richest and most varied."

The Washington Post called "I'm Inside You" a "dire carnal-love ballad." The Boston Globe considered Smoking in the Fields to be "a hard-rock triumph." The Toronto Star concluded that, "at their worst ('Down in Allen's Mills'), Del Fuegos sound like earnest Mellencamp imitators." The Times lamented that "Dan Zanes has forsaken the slobbish, neo-Tom Waits drawl that used to make his singing so wondrously heroic."

AllMusic wrote that "Zanes is in fine form with ragged voice throughout, yet this album remains a blueprint for how these generally well-written tunes probably sounded live in a smoky club, the band's natural habitat."

== Track listing ==
| No. | Title | Length |
|---|---|---|
| 1. | "Move with Me Sister" |
| 2. | "Down in Allen's Mills" |
| 3. | "I'm Inside You" |
| 4. | "Headlights" |
| 5. | "Breakaway" |
| 6. | "Dreams of You" |
| 7. | "The Offer" |
| 8. | "Part of This Earth" |
| 9. | "Stand by You" |
| 10. | "Lost Weekend" |
| 11. | "No No Never" |
| 12. | "Friends Again" |
