= Combustible Edison =

American neo-lounge music group

- Also known as: Combustible Edison Heliotropic Oriental Mambo and Foxtrot Orchestra
- Origin: Providence, Rhode Island
- Genres: Lounge, exotica, jazz, swing
- Years active: 1991–1999
- Label: Sub Pop
- Members: Miss Lily Banquette (Liz Cox); Michael "The Millionaire" Cudahy; Nick Cudahy; Mr. Peter Dixon; Aaron Oppenheimer; Michael "Laughing Boy" Connors; Robert "Brother Cleve" Toomey
- Website: Official website

Combustible Edison were an American neo-lounge music group founded in the early 1990s in Providence, Rhode Island. They were one of several lounge acts that led a brief resurgence of interest in the genre during the mid-1990s.

Unlike other bands with a more ironic take on the lounge scene, Combustible Edison took the music seriously and strove to add to what its members saw as a canon of works by Esquivel, Henry Mancini and Martin Denny. Said Trouser Press, "As the band that poured the first shot in the Cocktail Revolution, this Providence combo brought lounge music into the '90s—or, more accurately, transported tastemakers back to the suburbia of the '50s—with strikingly authentic interpretations of some of the most unauthentic sounds known to mankind."

The band ended in 1999.

== History ==
Connecticut natives Liz Cox (drums, vocals) and Michael Cudahy (guitar, vocals) formed indie rock band Christmas in Boston in 1983. They issued three albums, In Excelsior Dayglo (1986), Ultra Prophets of Thee Psykick Revolution (1989) and Vortex (released after the dissolution of the band in 1993). Cudahy's brother Nick was a member of the Christmas lineup for the second album.

In 1991, Michael Cudahy — now re-dubbed "The Millionaire" by fellow Providence bon vivant Robert Jaz — wrote a stage show titled "The Tiki Wonder Hour", and formed the 14-piece Combustible Edison 'Heliotropic Oriental Mambo and Foxtrot Orchestra' to accompany the performance. After three performances of "Tiki Wonder Hour," the orchestra shortened its name to Combustible Edison and slimmed down to five core members: Cox (renamed "Miss Lily Banquette", on vocals and various percussion instruments), The Millionaire (guitar), Nick Cudahy (bass), Mr. Peter Dixon (keyboards) and Aaron Oppenheimer (drums and percussion).

Combustible Edison signed to Sub Pop Records and released their debut album, I, Swinger, in 1994. A live review by Los Angeles Times critic Chuck Crisafulli noted that the album "perfectly duplicates the '50s cool and hi-fi exotica of such lounge icons as Martin Denny", while Trouser Press said, "I, Swinger is a faithful replication of bargain-bin exotica, right down to a sleeve festooned with cocktail recipes and calculatedly dated hep-cat liner notes". The group performed on Late Night with Conan O'Brien on December 23, 1994.

In 1995, the band recorded the soundtrack to the film Four Rooms, produced by Mark Mothersbaugh. "Vertigogo", the film's main theme, was submitted for consideration for an Academy Award, but was ultimately disqualified from consideration because of its incomprehensible lyrical content, despite the fact that the band submitted a lyric sheet with their best written approximation of the lyrics.

The group's second studio album, Schizophonic! was issued in 1996. During this period, Dixon was replaced by keyboardist Robert "Brother Cleve" Toomey, a former WMBR DJ who was previously a member of the Swinging Erudites, the Del Fuegos, the Fabulous Billygoons, and Barrence Whitfield & the Savages.

By the time of Combustible Edison's final album, The Impossible World (1998), drummer Michael "Laughing Boy" Connors had replaced Oppenheimer, and they had incorporated more modern electronic elements.

The group split during the 1999 tour for The Impossible World.

After the band had split, former member Nicholas Cudahy recovered original demo recordings from 1992. These recordings were released by Sundazed Music under the album Forbidden Isle of Demos.

== Other projects ==
After Combustible Edison, Michael Cudahy helped build the internet radio station and music community site LuxuriaMusic, which launched in 1999. A cocktail enthusiast, Cudahy was credited with coining the term "Cocktail Nation" as well as the Combustible Edison cocktail. The recipe for the cocktail was featured on the back cover of Combustible Edison's debut album, and was later collected by Paul Harrington in his 1998 book Cocktail: The Drinks Bible for the 21st Century. Continuing to use his Millionaire moniker, Cudahy contributed three solo tracks to the 2003 compilation album Music to Lose Your Knickers By, and in 2004, he paired with Eric Bonerz to form Super Casanova, issuing the album Eternity Now.

Cox sang the Lesley Gore-cowritten "My Secret Love" on the soundtrack for the 1996 film Grace of My Heart, and "Oahu" on the 6ths' 2000 album Hyacinths and Thistles. She is currently involved with Community MusicWorks, a community-based music education and performance organisation.

Dixon released an instrumental solo album in 2007 titled Shady Planet.

Toomey, an acclaimed DJ (including a stint as DJ Sharaabi Kapoor), cocktail creator and bartender, later played and recorded with his group Brother Cleve and His Lush Orchestra, country band Wheelers & Dealers, and Miki Singh & Jetset (later renamed Dragonfly).

Connors joined the Toomey-produced tiki music ensemble Waitiki in 2006, and also formed his own combo Funk House.

== Members ==
- Miss Lily Banquette (Liz Cox) – vocals, bongos, vibraphone, drums, percussion, melodica (1991-1999)
- Michael "The Millionaire" Cudahy – guitar (1991-1999)
- Nick Cudahy – bass (1991-1999)
- Mr. Peter Dixon – keyboards, organ (1991-c. 1996)
- Aaron Oppenheimer – drums, vibraphone, percussion (1991- c. 1998)
- Robert "Brother Cleve" Toomey – keyboards, vibraphone (1996-1999, died September 2022)
- Michael "Laughing Boy" Connors – drums (c. 1998-1999)

== Discography ==
=== Studio albums ===
- I, Swinger (1994, Sub Pop)
- Schizophonic! (1996, Sub Pop)
- The Impossible World (1998, Sub Pop)
- Forbidden Isle of Demos (2023, Sundazed Music)

=== Singles ===
- "Cry Me a River" 7" (1993, Sub Pop)
- "Blue Light" CD (1993, Domino)
- "Christmastime Is Here" CD (1994, Sub Pop)
- "Vertigogo" promo CD (1995, Elektra)
- "Short Double Latte" CD (1996, Bungalow/Rough Trade)
- "Bluebeard" CD (1996, Bungalow)

=== Soundtrack albums ===
- Four Rooms: Original Motion Picture Soundtrack (1995, Elektra)

=== Compilation albums ===
- The Combustible Edison Mixer promo (1998, Sub Pop)

=== Selected compilation appearances ===
- "A Shot in the Dark" (Henry Mancini cover) on Secret Agent S.O.U.N.D.S. (1995, Mai Tai)
- "Millionaire's Holiday" on Martini Lounge (1996, EMI-Capitol Special Markets)
- "Vertigo", "Theme from Bewitched" and "The Millionaire's Holiday" on Cracked Ice & Crushed Velvet promo EP (1996, Elektra)
- "Miniskirt" (Esquivel cover) on Lounge-A-Palooza (1997, Hollywood)
- "Christmas Time Is Here" and "Sleigh Ride" on Combustible Edison's The Millionaire Presents Sub Pop's Holiday Sound Spectacular promo (1997, Sub Pop)
- "Sleigh Ride" on Hi-Fidelity Holiday...A Holiday Compilation in Stereo (1998, EMI Music Special Markets/Starbucks Coffee)

=== Guest appearances ===
- Monopoly Queen - "Let's Keep It Friendly" 7" single (with Lisa Crystal Carver and Boyd Rice)
