= Latin-esque =

Studio album by Juan García Esquivel and his Orchestra
- Released: 1962
- Genres: Space age pop, lounge music
- Length: 30:54
- Label: RCA Victor

Latin-esque is a studio album from the Mexican bandleader, pianist, and composer Juan García Esquivel and his orchestra. The album, released in 1962 on the RCA Victor label, includes both Esquivel's original compositions and his arrangements of Latin classics. The album was released as part of the "RCA Stereo Action" series.

== Production ==
To enhance the album's stereo effect, Esquivel separated his orchestra into two parts—"half in Studio 1 and the other half in Studio 2, almost a city block down a long corridor in the RCA Building in Hollywood." The musicians were able to hear each other and synchronize the music using an intricate system of headphones. Author and music curator David Toop wrote that Esquivel "explored the hallucinatory possibilities of stereo by recording sections of his orchestra in separate studios to achieve an exaggerated spatial image."

Esquivel held five rehearsal sessions prior to recording, to allow him to experiment with electronic effects. With the novel recording arrangements, Latin-esque has been called "the first album in the history of stereo recording to achieve absolute separation of the audio channels."

The album included Muzzy Marcellino whistling, 24 tuned bongos, and background voices that were not singing with the open mouth, but instead humming. The instruments used on the album included xylophone, accordion, electric and Spanish guitar, French horn, trumpet, flute, piano and theremin.

== Reception ==
Upon the album's release in February 1962, Billboard gave it four stars and wrote: "Latin rhythms, smartly arranged for stereo and played with style by the Esquivel ork, set this album apart from the usual run of Latin items. Actually this is a pop package that should have strong appeal to fans of the catchy Latin rhythms, and should also appeal to sound bugs."

AllMusic also gives the album a rating of four stars.

Reviewer Anthony Cresswell praised Esquivel's separation of his orchestra into separate studios, allowing him to skillfully mix instrumental sounds and original electronic effects to give the music a unique quality. Harold Angel of the Philadelphia Daily News also focused on the stereo effects: "Esquivel is always fascinating, but here, for the first time -- absolute separation of channels was achieved."

Reviewer Parry Gettleman in 1995 described the title track as "a lovely graceful tune despite over-the-top vocals that sound less Latin than B-movie-faux-Ancient-Egyptian."

In a 2024 ranking compiled of the 600 greatest Latin American albums, Latin-esque was ranked No. 76. Reviewer Irai GH praised its stereo effects: "[I]t is an expanding album that takes up all the space while listening, as it moves from left to right, from top to bottom and from front to back with intersecting instruments." GH also noted Esquivel's combination of elements from "composers such as Debussy, big bands, jazz instrumentation and electronic music." They also noted that Esquivel's compositions stood out for their ability to change atmospheres and create "the impression of being cinematically constructed moving scenes."

In his book Exotica: Fabricated Soundscapes in a Real World, David Toop wrote: "Unlike most recordings, there is no attempt to cement the right and left loudspeaker channels into a cohesive (if virtual) whole; for Esquivel, the space between loudspeakers was an empty vessel through which normally immovable instruments roamed, sometimes hovering in the air or darting back and forth like hummingbirds. Crude as the sound magic is, the illusionism has parallels both with the Kinetic painting and sculpture of Bridget Riley and Pol Bury or with the surreal imagistic dislocations of Salvador Dali and Rene Magritte."

== Track listing ==
Side A

1. "La Raspa" (arranged by Esquivel) 1:49
2. "Adiós, Mariquita Linda" (Marcos A. Jiménez) 3:12
3. "Jesusita en Chihuahua" (arranged by Esquivel, written by Quirino Mendoza) 2:18
4. "Cachito (Pedacito)" (Consuelo Velázquez) 2:21
5. "Latin-esque" (Juan Esquivel) 3:03
6. "La Paloma" (arranged by Esquivel) 2:03

Side B

1. "Estrellita" (Carol Raven, Manuel Ponce) 2:28
2. "(Óyeme) Cachita" (Bernardo C. Sancristobal, Rafael Hernández Marín) 2:21
3. "Jungle Drums (Canto Karabali)" (Ernesto Lecuona) 3:51
4. "Mucha Muchacha" (Juan Esquivel) 2:15
5. "You Belong To My Heart (Solamente Una Vez)" (Agustín Lara, Ray Gilbert) 2:40
6. "Carioca" (Edward Eliscu, Gus Kahn, Vincent Youmans) 1:40

== Credits ==
- Arranged and conducted by Esquivel
- Guest conductor, Studio 2 - Stanley Wilson
- Producer - Nelly Plumb
- Recording engineers - Al Schmitt, Dave Hassinger, John Norman
- Communications and maintenance engineer - Frank Trupia

== Re-releases ==
Latin-esque was subsequently released on compact disc. In addition, music from the album was also included in several compilations on compact disc, beginning with the revival of space-age pop and lounge music in the 1990s. These collections include:

- Space Age Bachelor Pad Music (1994) includes "Latin-esque" and "Mucha Muchacha".
- Cabaret Mañana (1995) includes "Mucha Muchacha" and "Estrellita".
- Music From a Sparkling Planet (1995) includes "Cachita", "You Belong To My Heart", "La Paloma", and "Cachito".
- Loungecore (1998) includes "Mucha Muchacha" and "Jesusita de Chihuahua", "Cachita", and "Carioca".
- The Sights and Sounds of Esquivel! (2005) includes "La Raspa" and "Estrellita".
- The Best of Esquivel (2003) includes "Mucha Muchacha", "La Raspa", "Carioca", and "Jesusita de Chihuahua".
- Esquivel! Remixed (2006) includes "Mucha Muchacha", "Carioca", "Cachita (Oyeme Cachita)", "Latin-esque", and "La Paloma".
- El Padre Del Lounge (2007), a three-CD collection, includes 11 of the 12 tracks from the original album, including a remastered version of "Latin-esque".
- The Space Age Sound Of Esquivel (2017) includes "(Oyeme) Cachita", "La Paloma", "Estrella", "Jungle Drums (Canto Karabali)", "Mucha Muchacha", "Latin-esque", "Jesusita en Chihuahua", "You Belong To My Heart (Solamente Una Vez)", "La Raspa", and "Carioca".
- Stereophonic Sound (2022) includes "Latin-esque", "Mucha Muchacha", "La Paloma", "Carioca", "Estrellita", "Cachito", "Adiós, Mariquita Linda", and "Solamente Una Vez (You Belong to my Heart)".
