= Boston, Mass. (album) =

Studio album by the Del Fuegos
- Released: 1985
- Recorded: 1985
- Genre: Rock
- Label: Slash
- Producer: Mitchell Froom

The Del Fuegos chronology
The Longest Day (1984)	Boston, Mass. (1985)	Spin Radio Concert (1985)

Singles from Boston, Mass.
- 1. "Don't Run Wild" Released: 1985; 2. "I Still Want You" Released: 1986

Boston, Mass. is the second album by the American band the Del Fuegos, released in 1985. Its release coincided with the band's participation in Miller Brewing Company's "Made the American Way" television commercials; the band in part named the album after their hometown because the text appeared at the beginning of the commercials. "I Still Want You" was released as a single. The Del Fuegos supported the album with North American and European tours. Boston, Mass. peaked at No. 132 on the Billboard 200.

== Production ==
Recorded during the summer of 1985, the album was produced by Mitchell Froom. The band was chiefly influenced by 1950s rhythm and blues and 1960s soul, claiming that they did not listen to the art rock of their 1970s childhoods. They invited James Ralston, of Tina Turner's band, to play guitar on some of the tracks. Many of the songs, most of which were written by Dan Zanes, are about worrying over faithless lovers.

== Critical reception ==
Professional ratings
Review scores
Source	Rating
AllMusic	4/5 stars
Christgau's Record Guide: The '80s	B−
The Encyclopedia of Popular Music	3/5 stars
Lincoln Journal Star	3.5/5 stars
MusicHound Rock: The Essential Album Guide	4/5 stars
Omaha World-Herald	4/5 stars
Orlando Sentinel	4/5 stars

The Orlando Sentinel opined that the music is "blues-based rock, plain and simple... The playing is punchy and energetic... In spite of these pluses, the impact of this band's honest efforts on this record is diminished by the absence of the street-smart lyrical eloquence". The Boston Globe called Boston, Mass. "one of the finest Boston albums since the Cars' debut." The Gazette noted that the band "could have been the new Standells but settled for national beverage commercials on TV, instead."

The Philadelphia Inquirer praised the "clean-cut guitar riffs and the affably scratchy voice of lead singer Dan Zanes." The Los Angeles Times stated that the band "are aiming for a populist panorama of blue-collar America". The Morning Call admired the "Springteen-ish tales of teen defiance and heartache". The Columbia Daily Tribune panned the "genial mediocrity" and "filler" of much of the album.

In hindsight, AllMusic wrote that, while "the band didn't have quite as many good songs at their disposal as they did on the debut," Boston, Mass. still comes in as the Del Fuegos' close second best album "and time has been kind to it."

== Track listing ==
No.	Title	Length
1.	"Don't Run Wild"
2.	"Hand in Hand"
3.	"I Still Want You"
4.	"Sound of Our Town"
5.	"Fade to Blue"
6.	"It's Alright"
7.	"Hold Us Down"
8.	"Night on the Town"
9.	"Shame"
10.	"Coupe DeVille"
