= Schizophonic! =

Studio album by Combustible Edison
- Released: 1996
- Genre: Lounge
- Label: Sub Pop
- Producers: Combustible Edison, Brian Capouch

Combustible Edison chronology
Four Rooms: Original Motion Picture Soundtrack (1995)	Schizophonic! (1996)	The Impossible World (1998)

Schizophonic! is an album by the American lounge band Combustible Edison, released in 1996.

== Production ==
The album was produced by the band and Brian Capouch. All five band members contributed to the songwriting. "Morticia" is a cover of the Addams Family tune, composed by Vic Mizzy. The recording of the album was delayed by more than a year in order for Combustible Edison to work on the soundtrack to Four Rooms.

== Critical reception ==
Professional ratings
Review scores
Source	Rating
AllMusic	3/5 stars
The Encyclopedia of Popular Music	3/5 stars
Los Angeles Times	2.5/4 stars
MusicHound Rock: The Essential Album Guide	3/5 stars
(The New) Rolling Stone Album Guide	2/5 stars
The Tampa Tribune	2/4 stars
Waikato Times	3.5/5 stars

CMJ New Music Monthly deemed the album "a musical pastiche, but just as suave and easy to listen to as its precursors." Trouser Press thought that "having painted itself into a stylistic corner, Combustible Edison seems content to simply stand around and watch that paint dry." The Los Angeles Times opined that "perhaps the optimal (and only) way to appreciate it is with a luridly exotic drink in hand and a steady conversational buzz in the foreground." The Waikato Times wrote that "Combustible Edison are more bizarre than banal." The Orlando Sentinel declared that Schizophonic! "has a haunting quality reminiscent of Fellini film scores by the late Nino Rota"; the paper also picked it as one of the 10 best albums of 1996.

AllMusic wrote that "there's some melancholia and weariness to the torch vocal-influenced numbers in particular, which betrays an ironic, modernist bent absent from first-generation cocktail/lounge." (The New) Rolling Stone Album Guide called the album "entirely uninspired, and unnecessary in a world where Martin Denny records can be found at garage sales."

== Track listing ==
1. Alright, Already
2. Bluebeard
3. The Checkered Flag
4. One Eyed Monkey
5. Solid State
6. Les Yeux Sans Visage
7. '52'
8. Short Double Latté
9. Mudhead
10. Morticia
11. Objet d'Amour
12. The Corner Table
13. Lonelyville
