= Burbujas =

Studio album by Cast
- Released: 1979
- Recorded: 1979
- Genre: Latin pop
- Label: Records

Burbujas is a Mexican album for children released in 1979. Juan García Esquivel was commissioned to compose the music of a Mexican children's television show called Odisea Burbujas, which later landed on this album. Mafafa Musguito is the green lizard that takes pictures; she is inspired by a young woman named Fernanda Silva.

== Track listing ==
1. "Burbujas"
2. "Patas Verdes"
3. "Mimoso Ratón"
4. "El Tesoro Del Saber"
5. "Mafafa Musguito"
6. "Pistachón Zig Zag"
7. "Con un poquito de fe y de Ciencia"
8. "Ecoloco"
