= Vertigogo =

Song by Combustible Edison

from the album Four Rooms soundtrack
- Released: September 26, 1995
- Genre: Neo-lounge, exotica
- Length: 2:35
- Label: Elektra; Asylum

"Vertigogo" is the title theme for the Four Rooms film soundtrack by Combustible Edison.

It was submitted for consideration for an Academy Award but was ultimately disqualified from consideration because of its incomprehensible lyrical content. The reply by Music Branch Executive Committee chairman stipulated that "A special meeting was held recently for members of the Music Branch Executive Committee to view the video clip of your song and the music cue sheet and vocal lead sheet were carefully followed. The following decision was reached: The song "Vertigogo" was declared ineligible in the Original Song category because the lyric was not intelligible". The rejection stood despite the fact that the band submitted a lyric sheet with their best written approximation of the lyrics.

"Vertigogo" reached top charts in Japan. "Vertigogo" has later appeared as backdrop music on the NPR program This American Life.

== "Vertigogo" in popular culture ==
- "Vertigogo" was used for the soundtrack in the film Four Rooms.
- The song was used as background music on two Surf commercials animated by Airside and first broadcast in 2004. The first one depicting an anthropomorphic sock trying to escape from the washing basket until the lady successfully and finally shoves it into the washing machine. When the lady picks up the empty washing basket, we see another lifelike sock hiding underneath, intent on escaping. The other one (which was slightly more popular than the first one) depicts a red and flushed robin who sees a curly-haired lady pegging out washing, flies onto the washing line, inhales the fresh scents from the detergent, and exhales, becoming white again and flying away, whistling. These two commercials ended in the catchphrase "Look on the bright side".
- "Vertigogo" was used by the French TV show On a tout essayé as the opening theme.
- The song was playing in the car, where Lee's mother sits waiting for her in the parking lot in the film Secretary.
- A Singaporean TV series Three Rooms, also used this song as its intro.
- The song was used as the outro music for The Ron and Fez Show on WJFK.
