= Warren Zanes =

American musician and writer (born 1965)

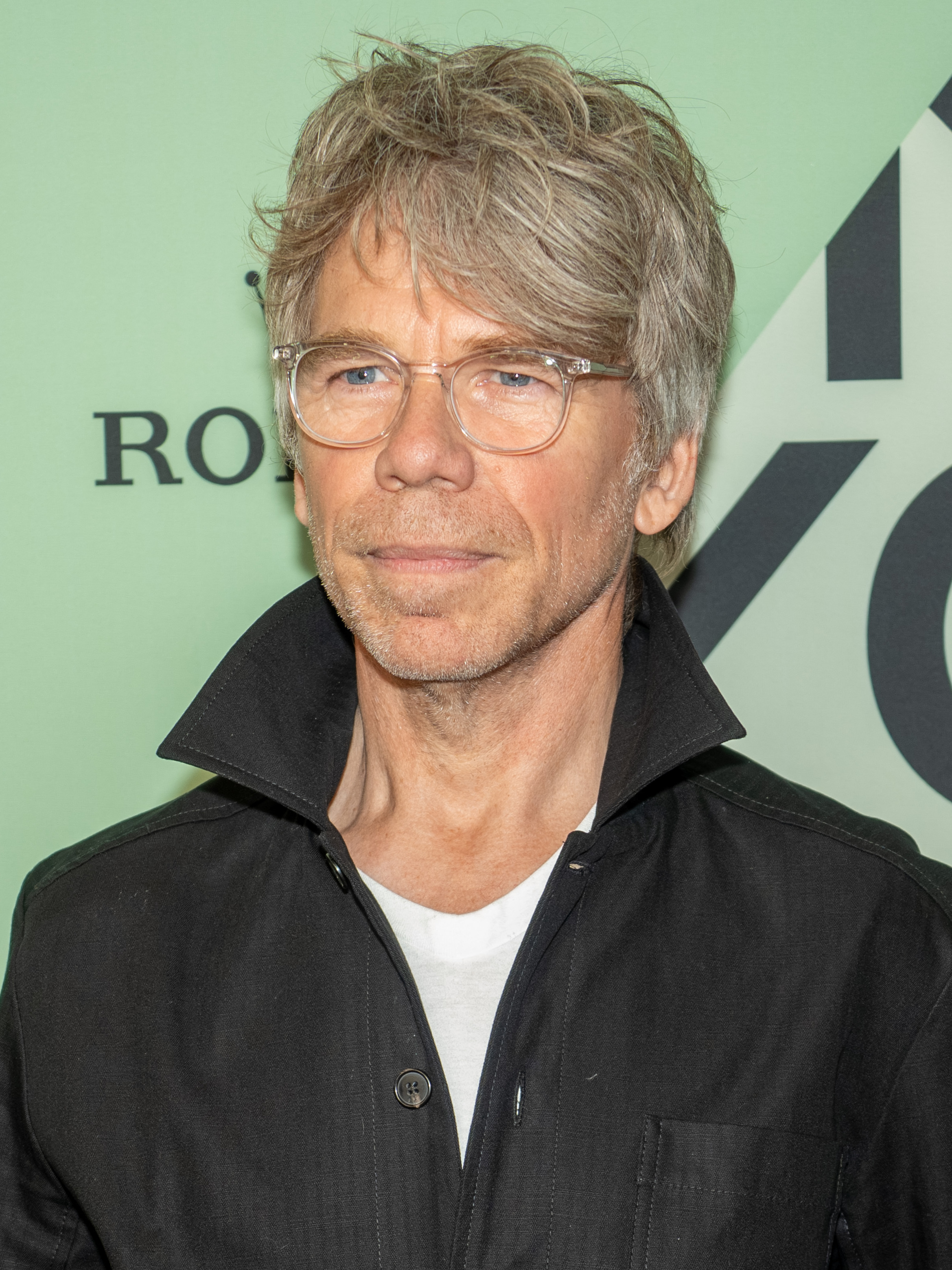
- Zanes in 2025

Background information
- Born: 1965 (age 60–61); Exeter, New Hampshire, U.S.
- Genres: Rock; pop
- Occupations: Music critic; musician; writer; professor
- Instruments: Vocals; guitar
- Years active: 1984–present
- Labels: Slash/Warner Bros.; Dualtone
- Member of: The Del Fuegos
- Website: www.warren-zanes.com

Warren Zanes is an American musician and writer. He is known as guitarist for the Del Fuegos, a solo artist, and the biographer of Tom Petty. A Ph.D. in Visual and Cultural Studies, Zanes is the former vice president of education and public programs for the Rock and Roll Hall of Fame and Museum and executive director of Steven Van Zandt's Rock and Roll Forever Foundation. Zanes has taught at several American universities, including Case Western Reserve University, University of Rochester, and New York University, where he has been teaching since 2015.

== Music ==
Zanes joined his brother Dan's band, the Del Fuegos, at age seventeen. The band signed to Slash Records that same year, releasing three albums with Slash/Warner Bros. before the younger Zanes left the band. The Del Fuegos toured with X, ZZ Top, Tom Petty and the Heartbreakers, INXS, and others during the time Warren was in the band.

Zanes returned to making music as he was writing his Ph.D. dissertation at the University of Rochester, signed by the Dust Brothers to their then-label Ideal Records. That solo debut, Memory Girls, was eventually released by Nashville's Dualtone, the label that would release his next four solo projects, People That I'm Wrong For, I Want To Move Out in the Daylight, The Biggest Bankrupt City in the World, and The Collected Warren Zanes.

Zanes joined poet Paul Muldoon's Rogue Oliphant in 2019 and has co-written several songs with Muldoon.

== Writing and film ==
Zanes's 2003 book Dusty Springfield's Dusty in Memphis about Dusty Springfield's 1969 album Dusty in Memphis was published by Bloomsbury as the first volume in their 33 1/3 series of books on classic albums. Tom Petty read the book on Dusty in Memphis twice and invited Zanes to dinner; as Petty told NPR's Terry Gross, the book inspired him to write the song "Down South" from his 2006 album Highway Companion. Zanes interviewed Terry Gilliam, Eric Idle, Jeff Lynne, George Martin, Klaus Voormann and others for Martin Scorsese's 2011 documentary on George Harrison, George Harrison: Living in the Material World. Zanes acted as consulting producer for director Morgan Neville's Oscar-winning 20 Feet From Stardom (2013), received a Grammy nomination as a producer of the PBS series Soundbreaking (2016), and served as writer for director Thom Zimny's The Gift: The Journey of Johnny Cash (2019).

Zanes's New York Times bestselling biography of Petty, Petty: The Biography, was published in 2015. He has also edited a collection of essays on Jimmie Rodgers, collaborated with Garth Brooks on two volumes of the artist's ongoing series, and written for Rolling Stone, the Los Angeles Times, the Oxford American, and more.

On March 26, 2024, it was confirmed that a film version of the 2023 book Deliver Me from Nowhere: The Making of Bruce Springsteen's Nebraska was in the works and it will star Jeremy Allen White as Bruce Springsteen.

== Bibliography ==
- Deliver Me from Nowhere: The Making of Bruce Springsteen's Nebraska (Crown, 2023) ISBN 9780593237410
- Petty: The Biography (Henry Holt & Company, 2015) ISBN 9780805099683
- Revolutions in Sound: Warner Bros. Records, the First Fifty Years (Chronicle Books, 2009) ISBN 9780811866286
- Tom Petty and the Heartbreakers: Runnin' Down a Dream (Chronicle Books, 2007) ISBN 9780811862011
- Dusty Springfield's Dusty in Memphis (Bloomsbury, 2003) ISBN 9780826414922
