= Juan García Esquivel =

Mexican composer (1918–2002)

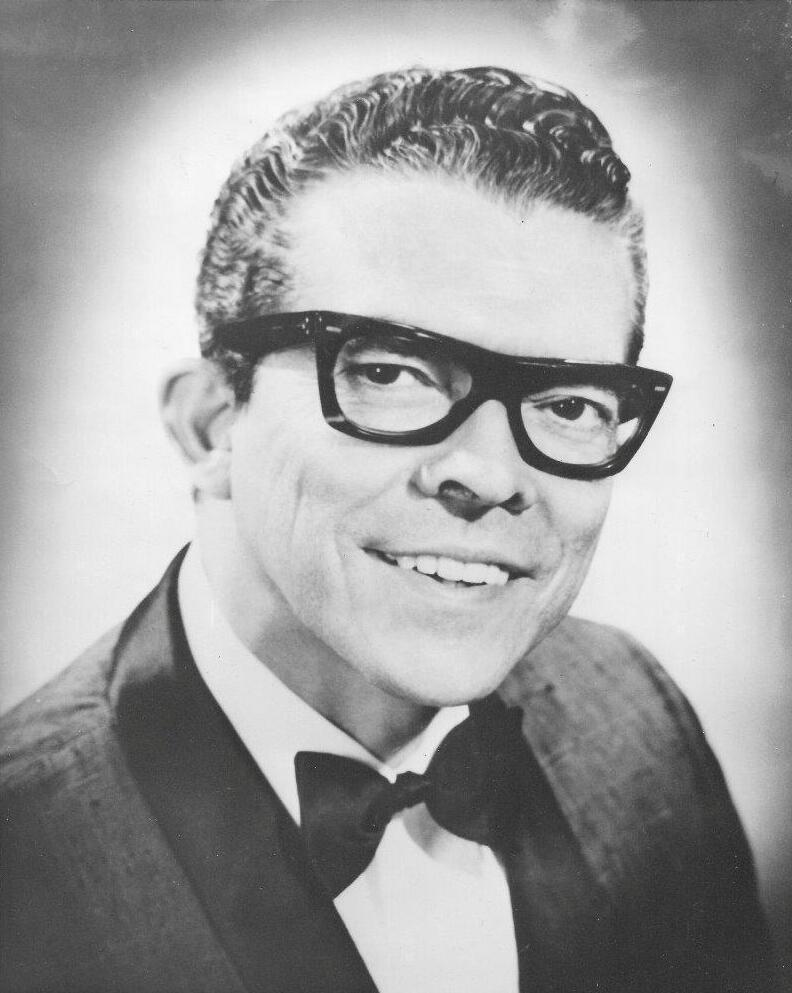
- Esquivel in 1967

Background information
- Also known as: Esquivel!
- Born: January 20, 1918; Tampico, Tamaulipas, Mexico
- Died: January 3, 2002 (aged 83) Jiutepec, Morelos, Mexico
- Genres: Easy listening; Lounge; Space age pop; Exotica
- Occupations: Arranger; Conductor; Bandleader
- Instrument: Piano
- Labels: RCA Victor; Reprise

Juan García Esquivel (January 20, 1918 – January 3, 2002), often known mononymously as Esquivel!, was a Mexican band leader, pianist, and composer for television and films. He is recognized today as one of the foremost exponents of a sophisticated style of largely instrumental music that combines elements of lounge music and jazz with Latin flavors. Esquivel is sometimes called "The King of Space Age Pop" and "The Busby Berkeley of Cocktail Music", and is considered one of the foremost exponents of a style of late 1950s-early 1960s quirky instrumental pop that became known (in retrospect) as "Space Age Bachelor Pad Music".

== Early life ==
He was born in 1918, in Tampico, Tamaulipas, and his family moved to Mexico City in 1928 where he became a self-taught musician from an early age. In interviews, Esquivel's family members have stated that the young boy started playing piano when he was around six years old, to the amazement of older musicians who would gather around him in disbelief and to his own delight exhibiting his musical gifts. They have also stated that Esquivel continued to eschew formal musical training as he grew older, preferring to learn from books and by listening to and playing music instead.

== Music ==
Esquivel played a style of late 1950s-early 1960s quirky instrumental pop known today as lounge music. Esquivel's musical style was highly idiosyncratic, and although elements sound like his contemporaries, many stylistic traits distinguished his music and made it instantly recognizable. These included exotic percussion, wordless vocals, virtuoso piano runs, and exaggerated dynamic shifts. He used many jazz-like elements; however, other than his piano solos, there is no improvisation, and the works are meticulously arranged by Esquivel himself, who considered himself a perfectionist as a composer, performer, and recording artist.

His orchestration employed novel instrumental combinations, such as Chinese bells, mariachi bands, whistling, and numerous percussion instruments, blended with orchestra, mixed chorus, and his own heavily ornamented piano style. Vocal groups were often utilized to sing only nonsense syllables, most famously "zu-zu" and "pow!" A survey of Esquivel's recordings reveals a fondness for glissando, sometimes on a half-valved trumpet, sometimes on a kettle drum, but most frequently on pitched percussion instruments and steel guitars.

Esquivel's use of stereo recording was notable, and he occasionally employed two bands recording simultaneously in separate studios, such as on his album Latin-esque (1962). That album's song "Mucha Muchacha" makes unusual use of stereo separation, with the chorus and brass rapidly alternating in the left and right audio channels.

He arranged many traditional Mexican songs like "Bésame Mucho", "La Bamba", "El Manisero" (Cuban/Mexican) and "La Bikina"; covered Brazilian songs like "Aquarela do Brasil" (also known simply as "Brazil") by Ary Barroso, "Surfboard" and "Agua de Beber" by Tom Jobim, and composed spicy lounge-like novelties such as "Mini Skirt", "Yeyo", "Latin-esque", "Mucha Muchacha" and "Whatchamacallit". He was commissioned to compose the music of a Mexican children's TV show Odisea Burbujas. His 1958 album Four Corners of the World featured a fusion of "Latin American music combined with the wonderful melodies of European classical music."

His concerts featured elaborate light shows years before such effects became popular in live music. He performed in Las Vegas on several occasions, often as the opening act for Frank Sinatra. He frequently performed at the Stardust casino lounge circa 1964.

Several compilations of Esquivel's music were issued on compact disc starting with Space Age Bachelor Pad Music in 1994. The first reissues were compiled by Irwin Chusid (who also produced the first CD compilation of Raymond Scott recordings and the premiere release of The Langley Schools Music Project). The success of these releases led to reissues of several of Esquivel's original 1950s-1960s albums.

The last recording on which Esquivel worked was Merry Xmas from the Space-Age Bachelor Pad in 1996, for which he recorded voiceovers on two tracks by the band Combustible Edison; his voiceovers were recorded at home in Mexico by the band's keyboardist Brother Cleve, who also mixed the tracks. This album was a re-release of the six Esquivel recordings that originally appeared on the 1959 RCA Victor LP The Merriest of Christmas Pops, along with four more Esquivel recordings from the late 1950s and 1960s and two new Combustible Edison tracks featuring Esquivel's holiday-themed voiceovers.

The last CD released during his lifetime, See It In Sound (1998), was recorded in 1960 for RCA, but was not released at the time because RCA believed it would not be commercially successful. The album's concept was that Esquivel's music would be combined with sound effects and edited in a way that suggested a visual work such as a film, though without dialog or an explicitly stated narrative. For example, the album includes a version of "Brazil" with an arrangement that makes extensive use of editing and sound effects to suggest a person going in and out of several bars, each bar featuring a band playing a unique arrangement of "Brazil".

Esquivel also worked as composer for Revue Productions/Universal Television. There he scored the TV western series The Tall Man, and co-wrote, with Stanley Wilson, the Revue/Universal TV logo fanfare.

== Music in recent media ==
His recording of his composition "Mucha Muchacha" was used in the films Confessions of a Dangerous Mind, The Big Lebowski, The Notorious Bettie Page, Stuart Saves His Family, Nacho Libre and Beavis and Butt-Head Do America.

"Mini Skirt" was used as the opening theme for the BBC documentary series Louis Theroux's Weird Weekends and When Louis Met....

His recording of his composition "Whatchamacallit" was used in the 2002 film Secretary.

Esquivel's recording of "Boulevard of Broken Dreams" was used Better Call Saul Episode 2 "Mijo" (2015).

Esquivel's recording of "My Blue Heaven" was used in the trailer for the 2021 film Malibu Road.

In 2022, Esquivel's 1959 recording of "Fantasy" was used by Apple in its "Data Auction" global TV ad campaign, to promote privacy on its iPhone product.

== Discography ==
(12-inch LP releases, US and Mexico)

- Las Tandas de Juan Garcia Esquivel (1957, RCA Victor Mexico)
- To Love Again (1957, RCA Victor)
- Cabaret Tragico (April 1958, RCA Victor Mexico)
- Other Worlds Other Sounds with Randy Van Horne Singers (October 1958, RCA Victor)
- Four Corners of the World (December 1958, RCA Victor)
- Exploring New Sounds in Hi-Fi/Stereo (May 1959, RCA Victor)
- The Ames Brothers: Hello Amigos (1959, RCA Victor)
- Strings Aflame (August 1959, RCA Victor)
- The Merriest of Christmas Pops (1959, RCA Victor)
- Infinity in Sound, Vol. 1 (August 1960, RCA Victor)
- Infinity in Sound, Vol. 2 (April 1961, RCA Victor)
- Latin-esque (1962, RCA Victor)
- More of Other Worlds Other Sounds (1962, Reprise Records)
- The Living Strings: In a Mellow Mood (1962, RCA Camden)
- The Genius of Esquivel (1967, RCA Victor)
- 1968 Esquivel!! (1968, RCA Mexico)
- Burbujas (1979)
- Odisea Burbujas (1980, Discos America)
- Vamos al Circo (1981, Discos America)

(CD releases)

- Space-Age Bachelor Pad Music (1994, Bar/None Records)
- Music From a Sparkling Planet (1995, Bar/None Records)
- Cabaret Mañana (1996, BMG Entertainment)
- Merry Xmas from the Space-Age Bachelor Pad (1996, Bar/None Records)
- See It in Sound (1998, House of Hits Records), recorded 1960, previously unreleased
- The Sights and Sounds of Esquivel (2005, Bar/None Records)
- Esquivel! Remixed (2006, SonyBMG Mexico)
- Complete 1954–1962 Recordings (2017, New Continent, Europe)

(Related releases featuring Esquivel's music)

- The Unforgettable Sounds of Esquivel (Mr. Ho's Orchestrotica, 2010)
- Perfect Vision: The Esquivel Sound – Metropole Orkest (June 2013, Basta Music)

== See also ==
- Exotica
- Space age pop
