= Stand Up (The Del Fuegos album) =

Studio album by the Del Fuegos
- Released: 1987
- Label: Slash
- Producer: Mitchell Froom

The Del Fuegos chronology
Spin Radio Concert (1985)	Stand Up (1987)	Smoking in the Fields (1989)

Stand Up is an album by the American band the Del Fuegos, released in 1987. The band supported the album by touring with Tom Petty and the Heartbreakers and the Georgia Satellites. The album peaked at No. 167 on the Billboard 200.

== Production ==
Recorded in Los Angeles, the album was produced by Mitchell Froom. The band chose to add R&B elements to its rock sound. Merry Clayton, Tom Petty, and James Burton were among the many guest musicians.

== Critical reception ==
Professional ratings
Review scores
Source	Rating
Chicago Sun-Times	3.5/4 stars
The Encyclopedia of Popular Music	2/5 stars
Los Angeles Daily News	B
MusicHound Rock: The Essential Album Guide	3/5 stars

The Los Angeles Times wrote that the band "just can't invest these songs with much credibility ... the playing generally suffers from facelessness." The Globe and Mail determined that "the Del Fuegos do what they do respectably, but the style is backward-looking to a fault." The Washington Post concluded: "When roots-rock works, it's because the musicians claim the traditions and use them to create their own sound; on Stand Up, it's the Del Fuegos who sound used."

The Los Angeles Daily News stated: "The Fuegos sound strong and confident, even if the presence of outside talent and Froom's guidance might leave skeptics wondering who's really responsible for this young band's stand." The Daily Breeze opined that "even the funky horn section can't redeem dull songs like 'Wear It Like a Cape' and 'Long Slide (For an Out)'." Trouser Press called Stand Up a "messy indulgence ... [that] hasn't got any worthwhile songs or intrinsic personality."

== Track listing ==
No.	Title	Length
1.	"Wear It Like a Cape"
2.	"New Old World"
3.	"Name Names"
4.	"Long Slide (For an Out)"
5.	"He Had a Lot to Drink Today"
6.	"A Town Called Love"
7.	"I Can't Take This Place"
8.	"News from Nowhere"
9.	"Scratching at Your Door"
10.	"I'll Sleep with You (Cha Cha D'amour)"
