= The Del Fuegos =

American rock band

- The Del Fuegos photographed by Just Loomis, 1989

Background information
- Origin: Boston, Massachusetts, U.S.
- Genres: Roots rock; garage rock; alternative rock, punk rock; garage punk; blues rock; hard rock; power pop; new wave
- Years active: 1980–1990; 2011–2012; 2023–present
- Labels: Slash/Warner Bros. (1984–1987); RCA/BMG (1989); February Records (2011–2012)
- Past members: Dan Zanes; Warren Zanes; Tom Lloyd; Steve Morrell; Brent "Woody" Giessmann; Adam Roth; Joe Donnelly; Sonny Columbus; Brother Cleve

The Del Fuegos are an American 1980s garage-style rock band. Formed in 1980, the Boston-based band gained success in 1986 with their songs "Don't Run Wild" and "I Still Want You" and appearing in a widely seen television commercial for Miller Beer. The band's fans included Tom Petty, who appeared on one of the band's songs and featured them as an opening act on one of his tours. The Del Fuegos are named after the island of Tierra Del Fuego.

== History ==
The relationship between brothers Warren Zanes and Dan Zanes, then and now, has been described as being "fractious". Shortly after the band was dropped by Slash Records due to the commercial disappointment of their third album for the label, Warren left the band, as did Woody. After Dan and Tom recruited two replacement members, they released a fourth album with RCA Records. The band broke up within a year of the album's release. Dan later said of the group's demise, "The '80s were over, we were over."

Their song "Backseat Nothing" plays over the end credits of Rescue Me in Season 4, Episode 1 from 2007.

On June 23 and 24, 2011, the band played together for the first time in 21 years at the Paradise Rock Club in Boston. These shows raised money for Right Turn, a rehab program run by Woody. Later, they embarked upon a reunion tour beginning in February 2012 and ending in Dan and Warren's home town of Concord, New Hampshire, at the Capitol Center for the Arts on March 4, 2012. The reunited band also recorded eight new songs in three days, releasing them on February 21, 2012, as an EP titled Silver Star.

The Del Fuegos reunited for a one night event in East Bridgewater, Massachusetts, in July 2023. On December 21, 2024, they reunited again for two sold out shows at the Boston City Winery.

The Del Fuegos are scheduled to perform on September 13, 2025, at the Bellforge Arts Center in Medfield, Massachusetts.

== Band members ==
- Dan Zanes (guitars/vocals)

Dan Zanes released a solo album in 1995. Later, after distributing a cassette of original children's songs throughout his neighborhood, he began recording children's music with his band Dan Zanes and Friends. The band's music became very popular due to heavy airplay of the group's music videos on the Disney Channel's preschool morning block Playhouse Disney (now Disney Junior) and Noggin (now Nick Jr. Channel). In 2007, his album Catch That Train! received a Grammy Award for Best Musical Album for Children.

- Warren Zanes (guitars)

Warren Zanes left the Del Fuegos after the band's third album. He went on to earn two master's degrees and a Ph.D. in Visual and Cultural Arts. He is also the vice president of education at the Rock and Roll Hall of Fame. He returned to music in 2002 with a solo album titled Memory Girls.

- Tom Lloyd (bass)

Lloyd left the Del Fuegos after the band's fourth album. He returned to college and earned a bachelor's degree from the University of California, Berkeley, before graduating with a Ph.D. in Environmental Engineering from the California Institute of Technology in Pasadena in 1999.

- Adam Roth (guitars)

After the Del Fuegos, Roth (born Adam Wingfield Roth on May 16, 1958, in Philadelphia) worked on musical endeavors with comedian Denis Leary and recorded with Jim Carroll, David Johansen, and the Lemonheads frontman Evan Dando. He was also involved in the bands the Enablers and the Liza Colby Sound. Roth died of cancer on December 16, 2015, at the age of 57.

- Steve Morell (drums)

Morell left the Del Fuegos before the band recorded their first album.

- Woody Giessmann (drums)

Giessmann founded Right Turn, a program offering assistance to artists in recovery from drug addiction and other mental health issues, in 2003.

- Joe Donnelly (drums)

Donnelly has worked in a number of music projects since the end of the Del Fuegos, including Wiki 3 and Chris Pahud.

- Sonny Columbus

Columbus worked with the Del Fuegos on Christmas music.

== Discography ==
=== Albums ===
- The Longest Day 1984 Slash Records UK Indie #20
- Boston, Mass. 1985 Slash Records U.S. #134
- Spin Radio Concert (live) 1985 BBE Sound
- Stand Up 1987 Slash Records U.S. #167
- Smoking in the Fields 1989 RCA Records U.S. #139
- Best Of The Del Fuegos: The Slash Years 2001 Warner
- Silver Star 2012 February Records

=== Singles ===
Year	Title	Chart positions			Album
Year	Title	US Hot 100	US Modern Rock	US Mainstream Rock	Album
1985	"Don't Run Wild"	–	–	46	Boston, Mass
1986	"I Still Want You"	87	–	33	Boston, Mass
1987	"Name Names"	–	–	43	Stand Up
1989	"Move With Me Sister"	–	22	32	Smoking in the Fields

=== Other appearances ===
- Miller Music (1984; promotional compilation album; multiple artists; RCA)
- Miller Music II (1986; promotional compilation album; multiple artists; RCA)
