= Four Rooms =

1995 American film

- Theatrical release poster
- Directed by: Allison Anders; Alexandre Rockwell; Robert Rodriguez; Quentin Tarantino
- Written by: Allison Anders; Alexandre Rockwell; Robert Rodriguez; Quentin Tarantino
- Produced by: Lawrence Bender
- Starring: Tim Roth; Antonio Banderas; Jennifer Beals; Paul Calderon; Sammi Davis; Valeria Golino; Madonna; David Proval; Ione Skye; Lili Taylor; Marisa Tomei; Tamlyn Tomita
- Cinematography: Rodrigo García; Phil Parmet; Guillermo Navarro; Andrzej Sekuła
- Edited by: Margie Goodspeed; Elena Maganini; Robert Rodriguez; Sally Menke
- Music by: Combustible Edison
- Production company: A Band Apart
- Distributed by: Miramax Films
- Release date: December 25, 1995
- Running time: 98 minutes
- Country: United States
- Language: English
- Budget: $4 million
- Box office: $4.2 million

Four Rooms is a 1995 American anthology farce black comedy film co-written and co-directed by Allison Anders, Alexandre Rockwell, Robert Rodriguez, and Quentin Tarantino. The story is set in the fictional Hotel Mon Signor in Los Angeles on New Year's Eve. Tim Roth plays Ted, the bellhop and main character in the frame story, whose first night on the job consists of four very different encounters with various hotel guests.

Four Rooms was released in the United States on December 25, 1995, by Miramax Films. The film received generally negative reviews from critics, who praised the segments directed by Rodriguez and Tarantino, but heavily criticized the segments by Anders and Rockwell. For her role, Madonna won for Worst Supporting Actress at the 16th Golden Raspberry Awards.

== Plot ==
On New Year's Eve, bellhop Sam of the Hotel Mon Signor briefs his replacement, Ted.

The film's animated opening credits, inspired by the cartoons of The Pink Panther Show, feature the scat song "Vertigogo" by Combustible Edison.

=== Honeymoon Suite – "The Missing Ingredient" ===
- Written and directed by Allison Anders

Ted assists a group of unusual women with their luggage, which he brings to the Honeymoon Suite. He learns they are a coven of witches, attempting to reverse a spell cast on their goddess, Diana. The ritual requires them each to place an ingredient into a large cauldron; however, one has still to retrieve her ingredient – semen – with one hour left. She seduces Ted and they have sex in the cauldron. He leaves and they complete the ritual, and Diana emerges from the cauldron.

After Ted's service in the honeymoon suite, a party guest from another room calls the front desk for some ice. He is unsure which floor he is on, but eventually directs Ted to Room 404.

=== Room 404 – "The Wrong Man" ===
- Written and directed by Alexandre Rockwell

At Room 404, Ted finds himself in a fantasy hostage situation. Siegfried maniacally accuses Ted, whom he calls Theodore, of having slept with his wife Angela. Ted is forced at gunpoint to participate in the scenario, uncertain of what is real. He tries to escape through the bathroom window but gets stuck, and a party guest vomits onto him from the window above. As Ted frees himself and climbs out, another guest arrives at Room 404 and is greeted by Siegfried in the same manner.

=== Room 309 – "The Misbehavers" ===
- Written and directed by Robert Rodriguez

A husband and wife leave for a New Year's Eve party, tipping Ted $500 to keep an eye on their children, Sarah and Juancho. Ted instructs the children to stay in their room; when he leaves, they vandalize the room, exploding a bottle of champagne. They call Ted for toothbrushes, and he tries unsuccessfully to put them to bed. He leaves but is summoned back to find the room in further chaos: a painting has been turned into a dartboard with lipstick and a syringe, Juancho has a cigarette, Sarah has a bottle of liquor, the television is set to an adult channel, and the children have found a dead prostitute in the box spring. Sarah stabs Ted in the leg with the syringe when he repeatedly uses the word "whore" and Juancho accidentally sets the room on fire. Their father returns, carrying his passed-out wife, and asks Ted, "Did they misbehave?" The sprinkler system activates while everyone stands still.

Unsettled, Ted calls his boss Betty to quit. After a conversation with Margaret, he gets Betty on the phone and tries to quit, but receives a call from the hotel penthouse. Betty persuades him to stay on long enough to tend to the guests.

=== Penthouse – "The Man from Hollywood" ===
- Written and directed by Quentin Tarantino

The penthouse is occupied by famous director Chester Rush and his friends. They request a block of wood, three nails, a ball of twine, a bucket of ice, a doughnut, a club sandwich, and a hatchet. Once Ted brings in the items, substituting a meat cleaver for the hatchet, he is invited to join their challenge. Inspired by the Alfred Hitchcock Presents episode "Man from the South" (referred to in the film as "The Man from Rio"), Chester's friend Norman has bet his little finger against Chester's beloved vintage Chevrolet Chevelle that he can ignite his Zippo lighter ten times in a row. Ted tries to leave, but Chester entices him to stay by offering $100 to hear him out and a further $900 to act as referee and sever Norman's finger should he lose the bet. Ted agrees to participate. Norman's lighter fails on the first try, and Ted immediately chops off his little finger, sweeps up the money, and leaves the penthouse with a spring in his step. As the credits roll, Chester and company frantically prepare to take a screaming Norman to the hospital.

== Cast ==
- Tim Roth as Ted
- Marc Lawrence as Sam

=== "The Missing Ingredient" ===
- Sammi Davis as Jezebel
- Amanda de Cadenet as Diana
- Valeria Golino as Athena
- Madonna as Elspeth
- Ione Skye as Eva
- Lili Taylor as Raven
- Alicia Witt as Kiva

=== "The Wrong Man" ===
- David Proval as Siegfried
- Jennifer Beals as Angela
- Lawrence Bender as Long Hair Yuppie Scum
- Paul Skemp as Real Theodore
- Quinn Thomas Hellerman as Baby Bellhop

=== "The Misbehavers" ===
- Antonio Banderas as Husband
- Tamlyn Tomita as Wife
- Lana McKissack as Sarah
- Danny Verduzco as Juancho
- Patricia Vonne as Corpse
- Salma Hayek as TV Dancing Girl

=== Betty's house ===
- Kathy Griffin as Betty
- Marisa Tomei as Margaret
- Julie McClean as Left Redhead
- Laura Rush as Right Redhead

=== "The Man from Hollywood" ===
- Quentin Tarantino as Chester Rush
- Jennifer Beals as Angela
- Paul Calderón as Norman
- Bruce Willis as Leo (uncredited)
- Kimberly Blair as Hooker (uncredited)

== Crossovers between rooms ==
The four segments are shown chronologically, except for "The Misbehavers", the events of which both precede and succeed the events of "The Wrong Man".

There are some connections between the four segments:

- In "The Wrong Man", Ted recalls the witches' ritual in "The Missing Ingredient" with the expression "weird voodoo thing".
- Ted can be seen with the two cherries from "The Missing Ingredient" at the beginning of "The Misbehavers".
- Sarah in "The Misbehavers" calls a random room to ask a question. The man who picks up happens to be Siegfried from "The Wrong Man".
- Angela appears in both "The Wrong Man" and "The Man from Hollywood".
- When calling his boss, just before the beginning of "The Man from Hollywood", Ted recalls the events of the first three segments.

== Production ==
The film was the project of the so-called Sundance "Class of '92", with Robert Rodriguez being considered an honorary member for attending the festival in 1993. Allison Anders believed that the sense of community that characterized the filmmakers of the New Hollywood era was lacking in the 1990s, with many new directors who did not attend film school instead uniting through the Sundance film festival. While premiering his film In the Soup at Sundance, Alexandre Rockwell met Quentin Tarantino, Anders and Richard Linklater, with Rockwell describing the rise of new filmmakers as having a "New Wave feeling", and thought it would be a good idea to create a movie that encapsulated that feeling. Rockwell suggested creating a film whose plot revolved around a Hotel Bellhop's activities on New Year's Eve. Rockwell called Tarantino with this pitch, who was immediately interested. It was decided that each filmmaker would write and direct a segment involving the Bellhop Ted, played by Tim Roth. The role of Ted was originally going to be played by Steve Buscemi. Linklater was originally supposed to direct a fifth segment in the film, but eventually dropped out.

Tarantino handed in the first draft of the film to Miramax, although Anders described herself as being "horrified" he had done so because they had barely worked on it. Despite this, Miramax never asked for a rewrite, with the film entering pre-production in the fall of 1994. In the aftermath of Pulp Fiction's success, the other directors found that no decision could be made without Tarantino's approval. Tarantino would joke that his segment would be titled "The One You've All Been Waiting For", prompting annoyance from the others, with Anders comparing Tarantino's segment to his perception of his fame following Pulp Fiction, in which his character Chester Rush is surrounded by people he hardly knows who are "sucking off his fame..." The first cut of the film ran two hours and 40 minutes long, with executive producer Harvey Weinstein requesting the film be shortened. As Tarantino was considered "untouchable" due to his status and Rodriguez's segment was virtually shot without cuts, only Anders and Rockwell were pressured to cut down their segments.

Anders and Rockwell subsequently became unhappy with the production due to Weinstein's actions and behavior, who described working on the film as "working with two geniuses and two hacks", and who also told Rockwell that he would be "an insignificant art director for the rest of [his] life." Bob Weinstein informed Anders that the studio had recut her segment without her knowledge, further annoying Anders, who would refuse to promote the film as a result. By the end of the production, the four directors were barely speaking.

Bruce Willis filmed his role in two days, but worked on the film without being paid as a favor to Tarantino. As a result of violating Screen Actors Guild union rules, his performance went uncredited.

Miramax presold Japanese distribution rights to Shochiku along with Gary Fleder's Things to Do in Denver When You're Dead, George T. Miller's Robinson Crusoe, John Ehle's The Journey of August King and Joe Chappelle's Halloween: The Curse of Michael Myers in a bulk acquisition deal.

== Reception ==
=== Critical reception ===
James Berardinelli of ReelViews described it as "one of 1995's major disappointments". Hal Hinson of The Washington Post said it "asserts itself as a goof so laboriously and aggressively that you almost feel pinned back in your seat". Roger Ebert of the Chicago Sun-Times singled out Rodriguez's "The Misbehavers" segment as the funniest of the film and the one that most effectively capitalized on Roth. Of Tarantino's "The Man from Hollywood" segment, Ebert said, "Tarantino had the right idea in choosing to satirize himself but unfortunately does not seem to understand why he is funny. A movie about him making this film could have been hilarious."

The film won a Razzie Award for Worst Supporting Actress for Madonna.

On the review aggregator website Rotten Tomatoes, 13% of 45 critics' reviews are positive, with an average rating of 3.8/10. The website's consensus reads: "Four Rooms comes stocked with a ton of talent on both sides of the camera, yet only manages to add up to a particularly uneven -- and dismayingly uninspired -- anthology effort."

=== Box office ===
The film grossed $4,257,354 in only 319 theaters.

== Home video ==
Four Rooms was released on DVD on April 20, 1999 by Buena Vista Distribution. It was released on DVD on June 28, 2011 by Echo Bridge Entertainment. It was released on DVD and Digital on March 3, 2015 by Lionsgate Films. It was released on 4K Ultra HD Blu-ray and standard Blu-ray on November 10, 2026 by Kino Lorber.

== See also ==
- List of films set around New Year
- List of films about witchcraft

== Bibliography ==
- Biskind, Peter (2004). Down and Dirty Pictures: Miramax, Sundance, and the Rise of Independent Film. Simon and Schuster. ISBN 978-0-684-86259-0.
