= Retrospective: The Best of Suzanne Vega =

Greatest hits album by Suzanne Vega
- Released: 2003
- Genre: Folk rock; acoustic rock
- Length: 77:50
- Label: A&M

Suzanne Vega chronology
Songs in Red and Gray (2001)	Retrospective: The Best of Suzanne Vega (2003)	Beauty & Crime (2007)

Professional ratings
Review scores
Source	Rating
AllMusic	4.5/5 stars

Retrospective: The Best of Suzanne Vega is a greatest hits album by the American singer/songwriter Suzanne Vega, released in 2003. This album is an updated version of her previous greatest hits album Tried & True: The Best of Suzanne Vega, with a few more songs ("Tired of Sleeping", "Calypso", "Solitude Standing", "(I'll Never Be) Your Maggie May", and "Woman on the Tier (I'll See You Through)") but without "Book & a Cover". Bonus CD from UK release includes live performance with another song; "Anniversary", which was not published earlier.

== Reception ==
John Murphy from MusicOMH considered the album to have a "much more representative track listing" than Tried & True and had a positive view on it, writing: "With material this good it's hard to level any criticisms at Retrospective." The only problems he saw were "pretentious sleeve notes" not written by Vega herself and "the lack of a chronological order", but for him these were just "minor quibbles".

Gregory McIntosh from AllMusic thought that "the overall collection feels a little bit more hearty with a total of 21 tracks instead of 17" compared to Tried & True and gave it a 4.5/5 stars.

== Track listing ==
All tracks are written by Suzanne Vega, except where specified.

No.	Title	Writer(s)	Original release	Length
1.	"Luka"		Solitude Standing, 1987	3:52
2.	"Tom's Diner" (DNA remix)		non-album single, 1990	3:49
3.	"Marlene on the Wall"		Suzanne Vega, 1985	3:41
4.	"Caramel"		Nine Objects of Desire, 1996	2:54
5.	"99.9F°"		99.9F°, 1992	3:15
6.	"Tired of Sleeping"		Days of Open Hand, 1990	4:25
7.	"Small Blue Thing"		Suzanne Vega	3:56
8.	"Blood Makes Noise"		99.9F°	2:29
9.	"Left of Center"	Vega, Steve Addabbo	Pretty in Pink, 1986	3:30
10.	"(I'll Never Be) Your Maggie May"		Songs in Red and Gray, 2001	3:48
11.	"In Liverpool"		99.9F°	4:44
12.	"Gypsy"		Solitude Standing	4:03
13.	"Book of Dreams"	Vega, Anton Sanko	Days of Open Hand	3:24
14.	"No Cheap Thrill"		Nine Objects of Desire	3:10
15.	"Calypso"		Solitude Standing	4:13
16.	"World Before Columbus"		Nine Objects of Desire	3:27
17.	"Solitude Standing"	Vega, Sanko, Michael Visceglia, Marc Shulman, Stephen Ferrera	Solitude Standing	4:39
18.	"Penitent"		Songs in Red and Gray	4:18
19.	"Rosemary (Remember Me)"		Tried & True: The Best of Suzanne Vega, 1998	2:44
20.	"The Queen and the Soldier" (live, July 26, 1991, Nyon, Switzerland)		previously unreleased	5:02
21.	"Woman On the Tier (I'll See You Through)"		Dead Man Walking, 1996	2:27
Total length:				77:50

== Charts ==
Chart performance for Retrospective: The Best of Suzanne Vega
Chart (2003)	Peak position
UK Albums (OCC)	27
Scottish Albums (OCC)	23

== Certifications ==
Region	Certification	Certified units/sales
United Kingdom (BPI)	Gold	100,000^{‡}
^{‡} Sales+streaming figures based on certification alone.
