= Close-Up Vol. 1, Love Songs =

Studio album by Suzanne Vega
- Released: February 2, 2010
- Genre: Acoustic
- Length: 45:55
- Label: Amanuensis Productions

Suzanne Vega chronology
Beauty & Crime (2007)	Close-Up Vol. 1, Love Songs (2010)	Close-Up Vol. 2, People & Places (2010)

Close-Up Vol. 1, Love Songs is a studio album release by American singer-songwriter Suzanne Vega. The album consists of re-recordings of songs from Vega's back catalogue with stripped-down arrangements that highlight her lyrics and melodies.

Love Songs is the first volume of Vega's Close-Up Collection which were released over the next two years; and was followed by the albums People and Places, States of Being and Songs of Family.

A "Deluxe Edition" available exclusively on iTunes includes four extra tracks.

Professional ratings
Review scores
Source	Rating
AllMusic	3.5/5 stars
Daily Express	4/5 stars
The Guardian	3/5 stars
PopMatters	7/10

== Track listing ==
All tracks are written by Suzanne Vega.

No.	Title	Original album	Length
1.	"Small Blue Thing"	Suzanne Vega (1985)	4:04
2.	"Caramel"	Nine Objects of Desire (1996)	3:06
3.	"(If You Were) In My Movie"	99.9F° (1992)	2:56
4.	"Gypsy"	Solitude Standing (1987)	4:10
5.	"Marlene on the Wall"	Suzanne Vega	4:15
6.	"(I'll Never Be) Your Maggie May"	Songs in Red and Gray (2001)	3:37
7.	"Harbor Song"	Songs in Red and Gray	4:17
8.	"Headshots"	Nine Objects of Desire	2:54
9.	"Song in Red and Gray"	Songs in Red and Gray	4:16
10.	"Stockings"	Nine Objects of Desire	3:40
11.	"Some Journey"	Suzanne Vega	4:23
12.	"Bound"	Beauty & Crime (2007)	4:17
Total length:			45:55

iTunes bonus tracks
No.	Title	Original album	Length
13.	"99.9F°"	99.9F°	3:05
14.	"It Makes Me Wonder"	Songs in Red and Gray	4:04
15.	"Freeze Tag"	Suzanne Vega	2:53
16.	"Knight Moves"	Suzanne Vega	3:52
Total length:			59:49

== Release history ==
Date	Format
February 2, 2010	Digital download
February 9, 2010	CD
