= Beauty & Crime =

Studio album by Suzanne Vega
- Released: July 17, 2007
- Recorded: November 2006 – January 2007
- Studios: Great City, New York City; Sear Sound, New York City; Jimmy's Studio, London, UK; Olympic, London, UK
- Genres: Folk rock; pop
- Length: 33:58
- Label: Blue Note
- Producer: Jimmy Hogarth

Suzanne Vega chronology
Retrospective: The Best of Suzanne Vega (2003)	Beauty & Crime (2007)	Close-Up Vol. 1, Love Songs (2010)

Professional ratings
Aggregate scores
Source	Rating
Metacritic	84/100
Review scores
Source	Rating
AllMusic	4/5 stars
Entertainment Weekly	A−
Evening Standard	4/5 stars
The Line of Best Fit	55%
MusicOMH	4/5 stars
PopMatters	7/10
Stylus	B
Under the Radar	7/10
USA Today	3/4 stars

Beauty & Crime is the seventh studio album by American singer-songwriter Suzanne Vega. It is her first album of new material since 2001's Songs in Red and Gray and her first for Blue Note Records. It was released on July 17, 2007. Beauty & Crime won the Grammy Award for Best Engineered Album, Non-Classical, on February 11, 2008. It was dedicated to Tim Vega, Suzanne's younger half-brother who had died in 2002.

== Development ==
After lukewarm commercial success for her last two albums, Nine Objects of Desire (1996) and Songs in Red and Gray (2001), A&M Records ended their contract with Vega with the release of the more commercially successful hits package Retrospective in 2003.

Vega embarked on an extensive tour and performed songs from Beauty & Crime in their early forms, including "Unbound", "Edith Wharton's Figurines", and "New York Is a Woman".

The album was recorded in New York City from November 10–27, 2006, with additional recording in England in January 2007.

== Track listing ==
All tracks written by Suzanne Vega.

1. "Zephyr & I" – 3:10
2. "Ludlow Street" – 3:16
3. "New York Is a Woman" – 2:54
4. "Pornographer's Dream" – 3:23
5. "Frank & Ava" – 2:38
6. "Edith Wharton's Figurines" – 2:23
7. "Bound" – 4:43
8. "Unbound" – 3:34
9. "As You Are Now" – 2:20
10. "Angel's Doorway" – 2:55
11. "Anniversary" – 2:57

Bonus track (Japanese edition)

12. "Obvious Question" – 1:50

== Personnel ==
- Suzanne Vega – acoustic guitar, vocals (all tracks)
- Gerry Leonard – electric guitar (1, 2, 5 to 11), acoustic guitar (4, 5, 10)
- Lee Ranaldo – electric guitar (1, 2, 10)
- Martin Slattery – piano (3, 4, 7, 10), flute (9), brass (3), reeds (3)
- Samuel Dixon – bass (2, 3, 6, 11) live bass (8)
- Tony Shanahan – bass (1, 5, 9, 10)
- Mike Visceglia – bass (4)
- Graham Hawthorne – drums (1, 3, 5, 6, 9 to 11), live drums (2, 7, 8)
- Jimmy Hogarth – percussion (1 to 5, 10, 11) electric guitar (1), acoustic guitar (11)
- Doug Yowell – drums (4, 6), percussion (4, 6)
- KT Tunstall – background vocals, vocal arrangements (1, 5)
- Ruby Froom – background vocals (2, 8)
- Beccy Byrne – background vocals (8)
- Emily Singer – background vocals (8)
- Anthony Genn – background vocals (11)
- Philip Sheppard – cello (1, 6, 7)
- Matthew Ward – violin (1, 7)
- London Studio Orchestra – strings (2, 4, 7, 9) led by Perry Montague–Mason
- Pete Davis – programming (2, 4, 7, 8, 10)

Production

- Jimmy Hogarth – producer
- Cameron Craig – engineer
- Emery Dobyns – engineer
- Tchad Blake – mixing engineer
- Bob Ludwig – mastering engineer

== See also ==
- List of songs about the September 11 attacks

== Notes ==
Vega wrote following comments on the album's songs:

- "Zephyr & I": a conversation between the graffiti artist Zephyr and myself, West End Avenue remembered
- "Ludlow Street": for my brother Tim who lived there, memories of parties and rehab
- "New York is a Woman": New York personified as a woman who has had a hard time but is still beautiful
- "Pornographer's Dream": what would he really desire?
- "Frank & Ava": a couple who gets along in bed but not out
- "Edith Wharton's Figurines": women past and present, how we suffer for beauty
- "Bound": a love song to my husband
- "Unbound": a spiritual song about a plant
- "As You Are Now": to my daughter, who is a natural treasure
- "Angel's Doorway": A cop is stationed at Ground Zero and his wife wants him to leave his clothes at the door. Also about troops returning home.
- "Anniversary": The anniversary week of 9/11 a year later in New York City
- "Obvious Question": about alcohol and the damage done (this track is only available on the Japanese import CD)

== Charts ==
Chart performance for Beauty & Crime
Chart (2007)	Peak position
Australian Albums (ARIA)	302
Belgian Albums (Ultratop Flanders)	31
Belgian Albums (Ultratop Wallonia)	69
Finnish Albums (Suomen virallinen lista)	13
Czech Albums	37
Estonian Albums	9
French Albums (SNEP)	52
German Albums (Offizielle Top 100)	81
Italian Albums (FIMI)	74
Polish Albums (ZPAV)	49
Swiss Albums (Schweizer Hitparade)	79
UK Albums	127
US Billboard 200	129
US Billboard Comprehensive Albums	140
