= In Liverpool =

In Liverpool may refer to two different songs:

- a track from the album Ringo 2012 by Ringo Starr
- a track from the 1992 album 99.9F° by Suzanne Vega
