= Tim Vega =

American painter (1965–2002)

- Born: Timothy Martin Vega; September 14, 1965; New York City, U.S.
- Died: April 29, 2002 (aged 36)
- Known for: Graphics
- Patrons: Blues Traveler, Gov't Mule, Spin Doctors

Tim Vega (born Timothy Martin Vega; September 14, 1965 – April 29, 2002) was an American graphic designer best known for his work with several musical acts, especially jam bands. Among his patrons were Blues Traveler, Gov't Mule, and Spin Doctors.

== Background ==
Vega was a New York City native, son of novelist Edgardo Vega Yunqué. He is Suzanne Vega's younger half-brother.

He started out in the graffiti art scene. Before long, his art appeared on official T-shirts for Blues Traveler, and even created the cover art for the band's self-titled debut album. He would later design posters for H.O.R.D.E, the music festival founded by the aforementioned act. In addition to his work with Blues Traveler, Vega is credited with creating the original logo for Gov't Mule, and several items for Spin Doctors. He designed the Warhol-esque tour T-shirt for his sister's album 99.9F°. During the tour supporting the album 99.9F°, he worked for his sister selling merchandise, including t-shirts with the images he created.

He was the in-house painter for Larry Bloch's Wetlands Preserve nightclub in New York City. He painted everything from the Volkswagen bus in the lobby to the bathrooms (which were painted several times). His work can be seen in the film Wetlands Preserved: The Story of an Activist Rock Club. In 2001, Vega worked as a production assistant for "On Stage! At the Twin Towers", a music festival held at the World Trade Center in New York City. He avoided being one of the victims of the September 11, 2001 attacks, because he called in sick for work that day.

== Death ==
Vega died on April 29, 2002. He worked at the World Trade Center, and though not present during the September 11 attacks, he was greatly psychologically affected by the event. His alcoholism in the months that followed proved fatal.

Later that year, a fortnight-long tribute was held (beginning December 6, 2002) and featured performances from Blues Traveler John Popper, Warren Haynes, Joan Osborne, among many others.

Suzanne Vega's Beauty & Crime was released in 2007, dedicated to the memory of Tim Vega.
