= No Matter How Much You Promise to Cook or Pay the Rent You Blew It Cauze Bill Bailey Ain't Never Coming Home Again =

2003 book by Edgardo Vega Yunqué

- Cover (hardcover/paperback)
- Author: Edgardo Vega Yunqué
- Cover artist: B. Middleworth/Elke Hesser/Photonica
- Language: English
- Genre: Family saga, jazz fiction
- Published: 2003 (Farrar, Straus and Giroux)
- Media type: Print (Hardback)
- Pages: 638
- ISBN: 978-0-374-22311-3

No Matter How Much You Promise to Cook or Pay the Rent You Blew It Cauze Bill Bailey Ain't Never Coming Home Again is a 2003 novel by Edgardo Vega Yunqué. The author has called it a "jazz novel."

Bill Bailey (Note: This short form of the title appears in several reviews and is used by the author himself.) is set in New York City in the 1980s, and tells the saga of Billy Farrell and his daughter Vidamía. Billy is a lackluster Irish-American who gave up music after losing two fingers, and some of his sanity, in Vietnam. Billy and Vidamía first meet when she is 12 years old. Her mother is a social-climbing, assimilation-minded Puerto Rican who has married a wealthy CPA and is raising Vidamía in the suburbs. But Vidamía finds herself strongly attracted to her father, her father's family, and the Lower East Side.

The novel's title is a play on the title and lyrics of the jazz classic, "Bill Bailey, Won't You Please Come Home?". The song and the relevant lyrics are explicitly mentioned in the novel. (Note: pp. 13,144,602)

== Plot summary ==
The novel is divided into four parts, called "movements". (Note: "A Symphonic Novel" appears on the cover, but it is not a subtitle. The phrase does not appear on the book's title page, copyright page, or in later lists by the author of his works.)

=== First Movement: The Quest ===
The novel begins in May 1988. Vidamía Farrell, almost 16, is finishing 10th grade, and recalls her first meeting with her father nearly four years previously, in August 1984, shortly after her 12th birthday.

Billy Farrell had been an accomplished jazz pianist before serving in Vietnam, and in one attack, he lost two of his fingers, part of his skull, and his buddy Joey Santiago.

Billy, on returning to the States, located the Santiago family, Joey's mother Ursula and younger sister, Elsa, age 15. Elsa had fallen in love with Billy from a photograph Joey had sent home, and meeting Billy in person led to a brief affair. Pregnant, Elsa dropped out of high school and broke up with Billy. She later finished high school, went on to college, married Barry López-Ferrer, and got a Ph.D. in psychology and became a psychotherapist/marriage counselor. Becoming wealthy, they moved to Tarrytown.

Vidamía, aged 10, was taken in by the Roots phenomenon, and this led to her interest in her own ancestry. This led to her questing for her father, at age 12. A friendly police officer who knew Billy, finds Vidamía and took her to meet her grandmother, Maud Farrell. Knowing Billy's delicate state of mind, Maud takes her time to arrange a meeting.

Over Elsa's objections but Barry's approval, Vidamía is picked up one morning by Billy's uncle, Michael Sanderson, and taken to Maud's house. Billy and Vidamía meet and get along very well, although Maud does most of the talking. Vidamía is amazed to learn she has about a hundred new relatives, and makes plans to meet Billy's other children, her three half-sisters and a half-brother. Taken home, she is confronted by Elsa, who is furious, lies about what happened between her and Billy, and forbids future meetings.

Billy reacts to the meeting with flashbacks, of both Vietnam and music.

Elsa finally agrees to let Vidamía meet her father and his family again for a mid-December Christmas party. Vidamía loves her time with them. The one sour note is Billy's refusal to join the family when they go carolling.

Vidamía spends most of her next several summers with the Farrells. Most of the time Billy is withdrawn. The family often jams, with Billy sometimes joining in on the guitar. During her fourth summer, shortly before her 16th birthday, an old jazz acquaintance of Billy shows up looking for him. He finds two of his children and jams with them, and when Billy shows up, he joins in. Something about the performance leads Vidamía to the conclusion that Billy is hiding, and Vidamía resolves to help him.

=== Second Movement: The Horizon ===
Vidamía's sweet sixteen birthday party is an expensive extravaganza, topped by Elsa giving her a credit card with a $25,000 limit. Vidamía starts thinking of using it to help Billy. She gets Billy to start playing the piano again. After a year she uses her credit card to buy a piano for Billy, enraging her mother. Vidamía promises to pay the money back.

Vidamía begins dating Wyndell Ross, a black jazz saxophonist six years her elder, of part Native American ancestry. She begins wondering about Elsa's never mentioned father, thinking perhaps he was black. Elsa finds this development so disturbing that she hires a private detective to follow Vidamía.

Vidamía's half-sister Fawn, an intersex girl just entering puberty, is having suicidal thoughts.

=== Third Movement: The Journey ===
Motivated by her payback vow, Vidamía and her half-sister Hortense ("Cookie") open a video store, with financial support from Barry. Vidamía tracks down her black grandfather, Justino/Tino "Tumba" Santiago in the Bronx, nicknamed for his playing of the tumbadora.

The store proves a success, and Vidamía pays her mother back for the piano. Elsa is surprised and furious upon learning Vidamía is dating Wyndell from the detective (who did not identify her visits to Elsa's father), and confronts Vidamía. Elsa denies race is the issue, and threatens to have Wyndell arrested for statutory rape, Vidamía threatens to marry Wyndell immediately.

Billy agrees to a gig, but the stress of performing leads Billy to attend VA meetings. Someone recognizes Billy, and tells him the killing of Joey and his wounding was a fragging, likely done by drug runners. Billy comes to a realization about himself: that his original enlistment and withdrawal from music was fundamentally due to cowardice. Being white, he would never perform at the level of the great jazz pianists.

Fawn is lured into an abandoned building by a gang of four Puerto Ricans. Her brother Cliff witnesses them entering, and runs home for help. Billy has Cliff call 911, then preps himself for combat, and heads to the building. The gang rapes Fawn, when the police arrive, they kill her and negotiate with the police as if they have a live hostage. Unable to wait, Billy stealths his way into the building, finds the apartment being used, breaks in, and kills the gang. Finding Fawn dead, he has a Vietnam flashback, where he realizes he had been the fragging target, for ratting on the war crimes of his seargent. As the police move in, he kills himself.

=== Fourth Movement: The Drum ===
There follow funerals, grief, and reconciliations, and the start of some careers.

== Music ==
Music is referenced frequently in the novel. Songs that receive more than a passing mention include:

- "Bill Bailey, Won't You Please Come Home?", title, pp. 13,144,435,437,602,635
- "Zing! Went the Strings of My Heart", pp. 33–4
- "El número seis", pp. 40,42
- "She's a Latin from Manhattan" (from Go Into Your Dance), pp. 40–5, 615–7
- "Estoy Buscando a Kako" (the Alegre All Stars), pp. 73,84,122
- "Summertime", p. 98
- "On Green Dolphin Street", pp. 100–1
- "The Lakes of Pontchartrain", pp. 131–2
- "My Funny Valentine", pp. 354,609
- "Darn That Dream", p. 612

== Self-reference ==
Vega Yunqué includes some personal self-reference in the novel.

- The High School of Performing Arts is praised as the school Liza Minnelli and Suzanne Vega (the author's step-daughter) attended, p. 275.
- A humorous novel about a Puerto Rican Eskimo is mentioned, a description that matches the author's The Comeback, p. 503.

== Reception ==
Reviews were positive in general. Some compared the novel to works of Thomas Wolfe, E. L. Doctorow, Thomas Pynchon, Ralph Ellison and William Faulkner.

This powerhouse of a novel ... brings vividly to life, with its polyphony of voices, the simmering ethnic stew of the great American city.

— Julia Livshin, New York Times Book Review

[Vega Yunqué] produces an almost hypnotically readable novel—about jazz, about race, about coming-of-age, and above all, about New York.

— Bill Ott, Booklist

[A] sprawling, iconoclastic, ambitious, stunningly written novel that is part picaresque, part Bildungsroman and part recapitulation of America's last half-century....

— Gene Santoro, The Washington Post Book World

The author's storytelling is unapologetically sentimental and rambling....

— ?, Publishers Weekly

== Awards ==
Vega Yunqué was one of the 2004 PEN Oakland/Josephine Miles Literary Award winners. The novel itself won the Washington Post Book of the Year Award.
