= Tried & True: The Best of Suzanne Vega =

Greatest hits album by Suzanne Vega
- Released: September 28, 1998
- Genre: Folk rock; acoustic rock
- Length: 59:39
- Label: A&M

Suzanne Vega chronology
Nine Objects of Desire (1996)	Tried & True: The Best of Suzanne Vega (1998)	Songs in Red and Gray (2001)

Professional ratings
Review scores
Source	Rating
AllMusic	4.5/5 stars

Tried & True: The Best of Suzanne Vega is a greatest hits album by the American singer-songwriter Suzanne Vega. The album was first released on September 28, 1998, and includes two songs ("Book & a Cover" and "Rosemary") that were not available on her earlier studio albums. Her next compilation album (Retrospective: The Best of Suzanne Vega) is very similar to this album, and includes several more tracks, but lacks "Book & a Cover".

== Track listing ==
All tracks are written by Suzanne Vega except where noted.

No.	Title	Writer(s)	Length
1.	"Luka"		3:52
2.	"Tom's Diner" (remix by DNA)		3:49
3.	"Marlene on the Wall"		3:40
4.	"Caramel"		2:53
5.	"99.9F°"		3:15
6.	"Small Blue Thing"		3:54
7.	"Blood Makes Noise"		2:28
8.	"Left of Center"	Vega, Steve Addabbo	3:32
9.	"In Liverpool"		4:41
10.	"Gypsy"		4:04
11.	"Book of Dreams"	Vega, Anton Sanko	3:22
12.	"No Cheap Thrill"		3:09
13.	"World Before Columbus"		3:26
14.	"When Heroes Go Down"		1:54
15.	"The Queen and the Soldier"		4:48
16.	"Book & a Cover"		3:49
17.	"Rosemary"		2:43
Total length:			59:39

== Charts ==
Chart performance for Tried & True: The Best of Suzanne Vega
Chart (1998)	Peak position
Australian Albums (ARIA)	98
Belgian Albums (Ultratop Flanders)	16
Belgian Albums (Ultratop Wallonia)	33
German Albums (Offizielle Top 100)	58
Norwegian Albums (VG-lista)	8
Swiss Albums (Schweizer Hitparade)	29
UK Albums (OCC)	46
Scottish Albums (OCC)	58

== Certifications ==
Region	Certification	Certified units/sales
United Kingdom (BPI)	Silver	60,000^{*}
^{*} Sales figures based on certification alone.
