= Marlene on the Wall =

- Cover of the 1986 re-release (7")

Single by Suzanne Vega

from the album Suzanne Vega
- Released: 1985
- Studio: Celestial Sound (New York City)
- Genre: Folk
- Length: 3:37
- Label: A&M
- Songwriter: Suzanne Vega
- Producers: Steve Addabbo; Lenny Kaye

Suzanne Vega singles chronology
"Marlene on the Wall" (1985)	"Small Blue Thing" (1985)
"Knight Moves" (1985)	"Marlene on the Wall" (1986)	"Left of Center" (1986)

Music video
- "Marlene on the Wall" on YouTube

"Marlene on the Wall" is a song by American singer-songwriter Suzanne Vega. In addition to being her debut single, it appears on her eponymous debut studio album, released in 1985 by A&M Records.

While the song failed to make any impact on the charts with its initial release, it became Vega's first top 40 hit on the UK singles chart upon a re-release in 1986. It has gone on to become one of Vega's best-known songs and has been included on the greatest hits albums Tried & True (1998) and Retrospective (2003).

== Background ==
The title of the song refers to German and American actress and singer Marlene Dietrich. Inspired by a poster of the actress, Vega said of the song: "I was thinking, 'If Marlene really had eyes that could see – if she was actually a sentient being, instead of just a picture on my wall – what advice would she give me and what was to be seen?'"

While Vega felt unsure about the song at first, considering it too private and obscure, her guitarist at the time, Jon Gordon, convinced her to keep the song as a show-opener due to its upbeat nature.

Spin wrote the song is "on the small scale... about a troubled, even masochistic relationship; on the big scale its [sic] about the limits of what one will endure in the name of love."

== Critical reception ==
Upon its original release, "Marlene on the Wall" failed to gain much success, stalling at No. 83 on the UK singles chart. However, after being re-released in 1986, it became her first top 40 hit, peaking at No. 21. It remains her highest-charting song in the UK. The song found its greatest success in Ireland, where it peaked at No. 9, becoming her first top 10 hit in any country.

== Track listing ==
All songs written by Suzanne Vega.

Original release

1. "Marlene on the Wall" – 3:37
2. "Neighbourhood Girls" – 3:19

1986 re-release (7")

1. "Marlene on the Wall" – 3:37
2. "Small Blue Thing" (Live) – 3:56

1986 re-release (10")

Side one

1. "Marlene on the Wall" – 3:37
2. "Neighbourhood Girls" – 3:19

Side two

1. "Small Blue Thing" (Live) – 3:56
2. "Straight Lines" (Live) – 3:48

== Personnel ==
- Suzanne Vega – acoustic guitar, vocals
- Sue Evans – drums
- John Gordon – electric guitar
- Frank Gavis – bass guitar
- C.P. Roth – synthesizer

== Charts ==
Chart (1985–1986)	Peak position
Australia (Kent Music Report)	39
Belgium (Ultratop 50 Flanders)	13
Netherlands (Single Top 100)	27
Ireland (IRMA)	9
UK Singles (Official Charts)	21
