= The Lamentable Journey of Omaha Bigelow into the Impenetrable Loisaida Jungle =

2004 novel by Edgardo Vega Yunqué

- First edition
- Author: Edgardo Vega Yunqué
- Cover artist: from Getty Images
- Language: English
- Genre: picaresque, magic realism, metafiction
- Published: 2004 (The Overlook Press)
- Media type: Print (Hardback)
- Pages: 352
- ISBN: 978-1-58567-630-9

The Lamentable Journey of Omaha Bigelow into the Impenetrable Loisaida Jungle is a 2004 novel by Edgardo Vega Yunqué.

The novel follows Omaha Bigelow, a 35-year-old failure, with whom Maruquita Salsipuedesa, a 15-year-old bruja, falls in love. She has her mother perform a "Ceremony of Enlargement" that makes him frequently irresistible to women, and picaresque, magic realist, erotic adventures follow.

Omaha Bigelow's (Note: This short form of the title appears in several reviews and is used by the author himself.) narrative is frequently interrupted by authorial commentary, on topics including baseball, literary ethnic ghettos, racism, and U. S. warmongering.

Regarding the title: "Loisaida" is the Nuyorican pronunciation of "Lower East Side".

== Reception ==
Reviews were positive in general, although some criticized the authorial intrusions.

Such intrusions become recurrent ...—but always exhibiting a biting sense of humor and always intricately related to the ongoing narrative. This is a novel without precedent, a challenge for critics but also a pleasure for the attentive reader.

— Naomi Ayala, The Washington Post Book World

How does he make the connection between American life and politics and tell the tale of an underendowed punk-rocker and an unlucky-in-love bruja? I promise you, he makes it work.

— Helen Ubinas, The Hartford Courant

[T]his wild and wonderful novel should hit home with its dark humor and its bittersweet humanity.

— Robert Friedman, The San Juan Star

Vega Yunqué has a keen intelligence, an ear for dialogue and a flair for zany passages of magic realism, but this sprawling, digressive book sinks under the weight of its snazzed-up style.

— ?, Publishers Weekly

Vega Yunqué’s lavish comic imagination fills the narrative with wonderfully offbeat characters .... But the novel collapses into metafictional mannerisms as Vega Yunqué inserts his opinions into the text ad nauseam ....

— ?, Kirkus Reviews
