= Songs in Red and Gray =

Studio album by Suzanne Vega
- Released: September 25, 2001
- Recorded: November 2000 – May 2001
- Studios: Chung King, Sear Sound, Shelter Island Sound, Looking Glass Studio (New York)
- Genres: Folk rock; folk pop
- Length: 45:31
- Label: A&M
- Producer: Rupert Hine

Suzanne Vega chronology
Tried & True: The Best of Suzanne Vega (1998)	Songs in Red and Gray (2001)	Retrospective: The Best of Suzanne Vega (2003)

Professional ratings
Aggregate scores
Source	Rating
Metacritic	81/100
Review scores
Source	Rating
AllMusic	4/5 stars
The A.V. Club	(favorable)
Blender	3/5 stars
Robert Christgau	(dud)
E! Online	B+
Entertainment Weekly	B+
Mojo	4.5/5 stars
Q	3/5 stars
Rolling Stone	(favorable)

Songs in Red and Gray is the sixth studio album by American singer-songwriter Suzanne Vega. It was released on September 25, 2001, by A&M Records.

== Music and lyrics ==
On Songs in Red and Gray, Vega returns to her signature acoustic folk-pop sound, shedding the experiments she had done in the 1990s with her husband, record producer Mitchell Froom. New producer Rupert Hine shows some traces of his past work with '80s new wave bands by employing electronic beats, but mostly allows Vega's voice and guitar to dominate in a manner reminiscent of her debut album and its 1987 follow-up, Solitude Standing.

Most of the songs, like "Widow's Walk" and "If I Were a Weapon", deal with the dissolution of Vega's marriage with Froom. Her "calm, hushed, clear singing" belies the album's "mood of heartbroken defiance". The lyrics are "the most personally revealing songs she has written" in her career.

== Track listing ==
All tracks are written by Suzanne Vega except "St. Clare" written by Jack Hardy.

Songs in Red and Gray track listing
No.	Title	Length
1.	"Penitent"	4:16
2.	"Widow's Walk"	3:33
3.	"(I'll Never Be) Your Maggie May"	3:47
4.	"It Makes Me Wonder"	4:00
5.	"Soap and Water"	3:03
6.	"Songs in Red and Gray"	4:18
7.	"Last Year's Troubles"	3:35
8.	"Priscilla"	4:14
9.	"If I Were a Weapon"	2:45
10.	"Harbor Song"	4:18
11.	"Machine Ballerina"	2:57
12.	"Solitaire"	2:10
13.	"St. Clare"	2:30
Total length:		45:31

Bonus track (Japanese edition)
No.	Title	Length
14.	"Golden"	3:53
Total length:		49:24

== Personnel ==
- Suzanne Vega – vocals, acoustic guitar
- Gerry Leonard – electric and acoustic guitars, dulcimer, mandolin, zither
- Rupert Hine – keyboards, bass guitar, percussion, drum programming
- Mike Visceglia – bass guitar
- Nik Pugh – drum programming, synth lead
- Jay Bellerose – drums
- Matt Johnson – drums
- Doug Yowell – drums, percussion
- Pamela Sue Man – backing vocals, harmony vocals
- Elizabeth Taubman – harmony vocals
- Stephen W Tayler – recording and mixing engineer

== Charts ==
Chart performance for Songs in Red and Gray
Chart (2001)	Peak position
Australian Albums (ARIA)	187
French Albums (SNEP)	36
German Albums (Offizielle Top 100)	53
Norwegian Albums (VG-lista)	34
Polish Albums (ZPAV)	31
Swiss Albums (Schweizer Hitparade)	47
UK Albums (Official Charts Company)	100
US Billboard 200	178
