= Edgardo Vega Yunqué =

Puerto Rican writer (1936–2008)

- Born: Edgardo Vega Yunqué; May 20, 1936; Ponce, Puerto Rico
- Died: August 26, 2008 (aged 72); New York City, U.S.
- Occupations: Novelist; professor
- Children: 4, including Tim, and Suzanne (stepdaughter)
- Writing career
- Period: 1977–2008
- Genres: Novel, short story
- Notable works: No Matter How Much You Promise to Cook or Pay the Rent You Blew It Cauze Bill Bailey Ain't Never Coming Home Again (2003); The Lamentable Journey of Omaha Bigelow into the Impenetrable Loisaida Jungle (2004)
- Notable awards: PEN Oakland/Josephine Miles Literary Award

Edgardo Vega Yunqué (May 20, 1936 – August 26, 2008) was a Puerto Rican novelist and short story writer, who also used the pen name Ed Vega.

== Early years ==
Edgardo Vega Yunqué was born in Ponce, to Alberto Vega, a Baptist minister, and Abigail Yunqué, and lived in Cidra, Puerto Rico, until his family moved to the South Bronx in 1949. Even as a child he loved to read, and became familiar with many of the great European works. His seminal influences included Miguel de Cervantes, Azorín, Borges, Unamuno, Lope de Vega, Victor Hugo, and members of the Generation of '27 literary movement.

Upon graduating from high school in 1954, he joined the United States Air Force. During his free time Vega focused on reading and analysis of American literature, after finding a large collection of books at his sister's house.

After Vega was honorably discharged from the Air Force, he attended Santa Monica College, and eventually got his degree from New York University. Vega temporarily dropped out of school after the assassination of U.S. President John F. Kennedy, and worked in East Harlem as part of the War on Poverty.

== Personal life ==
Vega was married to Pat Vega née Patricia Jean Schumacher on December 31, 1961; their marriage ended in divorce in 1997. They had three children: Alyson, Matthew, and Tim. Vega was also the stepfather of folk singer Suzanne Vega, whose song "Luka" deals with the emotional and physical abuse she said she suffered from Vega.

== Work ==
Vega focused on writing since 1972 and published his first short story "Wild Horses" in Nuestra Magazine in 1977. He wrote fourteen novels and three story collections. He said that he often worked on several books at once and had no problem keeping track of them:

Since my work is about people and my affection for them, I don't lose track of who they are just like I don't lose track of my children or other relatives and acquaintances. I have friends – and characters – whom I don't see for a long time, but as soon as we get together we pick up where we left off.

In addition to William Faulkner, John Steinbeck, Ernest Hemingway, and the magic realist writers, he was heavily influenced by Holocaust literature and by the concern of the Irish members of his childhood neighborhood, for the independence and reunion of their native country.

Vega's published fiction includes the novels The Comeback, Blood Fugues, The Lamentable Journey of Omaha Bigelow into the Impenetrable Loisaida Jungle, and No Matter How Much You Promise to Cook or Pay the Rent You Blew It Cauze Bill Bailey Ain't Never Coming Home Again. His short story collections include Mendoza's Dreams and Casualty Report, which were adapted for the stage and anthologized internationally.

== Reception ==
=== Bill Bailey ===
Critical reception of the novel No Matter How Much You Promise to Cook or Pay the Rent You Blew It Cauze Bill Bailey Ain't Never Coming Home Again was generally positive. The New York Times Book Review called it "a powerhouse of a novel ... it brings vividly to life, with its polyphony of voices, the simmering ethnic stew of the great American city", but also noted "flat-footed dialogue" and "the characters' belabored internal commentaries", saying "[t]he climax is so ghastly that the book never quite regains its equilibrium." Booklist hailed it as a "hypnotically readable novel--about jazz, about race, about coming-of-age, and above all, about New York ... honest, wrenching emotion, free of all artifice ... Vega Yunqué may just be the Thomas Wolfe of the multicultural twenty-first century."

The Washington Post described it as "a sprawling, iconoclastic, ambitious, stunningly written novel that is part picaresque, part bildungsroman, and part recapitulation of America's last half century ... Like jazz and like America, this novel is fluid, unpredictable, full of verve and smarts. But it is not merely an entertainment. Deeply revisionist, tinged with tragedy and yet doggedly optimistic, this is a work that belongs on the shelf with its epic siblings: E.L. Doctorow's Ragtime and Thomas Pynchon's Vineland."

Newsday found it "juicy, sprawling ... Yunqué succeeds brilliantly." The New York Post called it "a profound novel in the tradition of Ralph Ellison and William Faulkner." The novel also won the PEN Oakland/Josephine Miles Literary Award and The Washington Post Book of the Year Award.

=== Omaha Bigelow ===
Vega's reputation grew with The Lamentable Journey of Omaha Bigelow into the Impenetrable Loisaida Jungle. Kirkus Reviews declared the book a "raucous outing ... his characters hold forth in hilarious broken Spanglish ... vivid, wry, tragicomic ... Vega Yunqué is a potent talent." According to Booklist, Vega's "ribald and rambling style reverberates throughout his third novel ... he deftly skewers the politics of academia, the tyranny of mediocrity in contemporary American literature, and America's ongoing prejudice against Puerto Ricans. Vega, unlike many formulaic novels he disparages, definitely has a lot to say." Publishers Weekly announced that "Vega Yunqué has a keen intelligence, an ear for dialogue and a flair for zany passages of magic realism."

=== Blood Fugues ===
His subsequent novel Blood Fugues solidified Vega Yunqué's international reputation as a literary novelist. Publishers Weekly wrote that "Yunqué writes with grace, vividly evoking New York City and American life." Booklist announced "the author is a bravura storyteller with an extraordinary ability to create fascinating, emotion-engaging characters...the novel's subplots involving political terrorism and immigrant resistance to imposed assimilation are absolutely relevant to today's America." Kirkus Reviews noted the book's "distinctive architecture, mystery and suspense," that it was "highly descriptive," and contained "all the features of fine drama."

=== Short story collections ===
Vega's short story collections also met with critical acclaim. The San Francisco Chronicle announced that in Mendoza's Dreams Vega "shows us, in twelve funny and personality-laden tales, that there is indeed much more to life in Spanish Harlem than gang warfare; set to the strains of Bernstein and Sondheim." Kirkus Reviews called Mendoza's Dreams "a dozen loving comic fables about the Puerto Rican experience in New York City…well-written, affecting and gritty tales of El Barrio life: reality beginning in dreams. The Village Voice Literary Supplement found Casualty Report to be "brilliantly traced ... a multivocal journey through layers of miscegenated consciousness, intensely bound to a nation that often works like a dream."

Library Journal praised Vega's portrayal of "the consuming struggles and sorrows of Puerto Ricans in New York ... the stories betray a deep concern and love for people living precariously between two worlds. A fine, provocative addition for Latino and large general fiction collections."

== Activism and advocacy ==
Vega was the campaign manager for the first political campaign of New York State Assemblyman Nelson Antonio Denis, and served as the first executive director of the El Barrio Local Development Corporation (EBLDC).

He taught creative writing at the Latin American Writers Institute, the Teachers & Writers Collaborative, the New School for Social Research, as well as at Hostos Community College, Hunter College, and SUNY Old Westbury.

He also served as Director of the Clemente Soto Vélez Cultural and Educational Center, and as a counselor to ASPIRA and the Addiction Service Agency.

== Death ==
External videos
- Video about the life and work of Ed Vega on YouTube
- Video from the Ed Vega memorial service (with many family photos) on YouTube

Vega died on August 26, 2008, from a possible thrombosis at NYU Lutheran Medical Center in Brooklyn, New York and was buried at Calverton National Cemetery in Calverton, New York.

At the time of his death, Vega had completed the novel How That Dirty Rotten Charlie Maisonet Turned Me into a Puerto Rican Sex Freak, which was later published under the title Rebecca Horowitz, Puerto Rican Sex Freak. Vega was also finishing the story collection A Place of Remembrance on an Island Called Regret and the nonfiction book Spic, Writing Under the Threat of Censorship in the United States: A Jeremiad.

His obituary in The New York Times hailed Vega's honesty and his "picaresque, combustive and sometimes flamboyantly comic expressions of the Puerto Rican experience in New York’s multicultural maelstrom."

David Gonzalez of The New York Times blogged, "his novels captured the crazy glory of this city and its people, with jazzy riffs and elegant solos that flowed with rhythm. His words could dazzle, amuse and even infuriate."

== Major works ==
His first novel and both short story collections were published under the name "Ed Vega".

=== Novels ===
- The Comeback. Houston: Arte Público, 1985.
- No Matter How Much You Promise to Cook or Pay the Rent You Blew It Cauze Bill Bailey Ain't Never Coming Home Again. New York: Farrar, 2003.
- The Lamentable Journey of Omaha Bigelow into the Impenetrable Loisaida Jungle. Woodstock and New York: Overlook, 2004.
- Blood Fugues. New York: Rayo, HarperCollins, 2005.
- Rebecca Horowitz, Puerto Rican Sex Freak (cancelled in last-minute dispute with publisher). ISBN 978-1-59020-064-3

- Reviewed by Publishers Weekly.
- Reviewed by Kirkus Reviews.
- Reviewed by Library Journal.

=== Short story collections ===
- Mendoza's Dreams. Houston: Arte Público, 1987.
- Casualty Report. Houston: Arte Público, 1991.

== Awards ==
- PEN Oakland/Josephine Miles Literary Award (2004) for No Matter How Much You Promise to Cook or Pay the Rent You Blew It Cauze Bill Bailey Ain't Never Coming Home Again
- The Washington Post Book of the Year Award (2004)

== See also ==
- List of Puerto Rican writers
- Puerto Rican literature
