= The Comeback (novel) =

1985 novel by Ed Vega

- Cover (paperback)
- Author: Ed Vega
- Cover artist: Narciso Peña
- Language: English
- Genre: Satire, Metafiction
- Published: 1985 (Arte Público Press)
- Media type: Print (softcover)
- Pages: 479
- ISBN: 0-934770-29-8

The Comeback is a 1985 novel by Edgardo Vega Yunqué, published under his pen name "Ed Vega". The novel is a satirical look at Puerto Rican identity.

The novel's introduction begins with Vega Yunqué introducing himself, and a listing of the acceptable ways to address the author, singling out "Yunqué," his mother's family name, as unacceptable. The author then goes on to give a little autobiography.

== Plot summary ==
The novel is set in late 1970/early 1971 in Manhattan. It tells the story of Frank Garboil (1/4 Eskimo, 3/4 European) who in his early thirties has had an early mid-life crisis and has abandoned his wife, two sons, and job as a professor of economics at Frick University. Using the stolen identify of a Puerto Rican Armando Martinez, he goes to New Amsterdam College and becomes their hockey superstar. He has had a mental collapse in December and is being kept under psychiatric observation.

The novel opens with undercover police officer John Chota attending a meeting of the "Young Barons," a militant group favoring Puerto Rico independence. He learns that they are under the guidance of the notorious El Falcon, Chief Mullvaney's nemesis, who can appear and disappear in a flash. They are planning to liberate Martinez, whom they believe is being held against his will.

Garboil/Martinez is being treated by Drs. Dieter Kopfeinlaufen and Rapudiman Kohonduro, assisted by Nurse Ingrid Konkruka, and staff member Helen Christianpath. The top floor of the hospital, a solarium, has been converted into a fake hockey rink, complete with scoreboards and a sound system. The doctors and their assistants dress up as players and referees. Except for Konkruka, they do not believe his claims to be Frank Garboil, economics professor on leave from Frick University. Konkruka believes him, and is able to elicit his life story. His mother was killed when he was six, his father died a few years later. He did well in sports, had a near fatal accident in Army survival school, married well, had two children and then an affair, but felt he was missing something and walked out on his life. Using a stolen identity, he passes as Armando Martinez, and becomes passionately involved with Maritza Soto, Puerto Rican activist. But he is uncomfortable with his success at hockey, and has a breakdown.

The police learn that El Falcon and company will attempt to liberate Martinez the evening of February 9, coincident with the filming of Martinez's "cure" by Howland Gosell of Wild Whirl of Sports. The police are there, disguised as doctors, and utter chaos breaks out, amplified by the nitrous oxide the militants released, thinking it was ether. Mullvaney captures El Falcon, who turns into a giant bird and flies off. Garboil is passed out under his bed, but believed by the police to have been liberated. The psychiatrists release him without publicity.

Garboil visits Konkruka's apartment at her invitation. Rather than the affair he was expecting, she reveals that she works for a government agency that has been watching Garboil since his Army days—they implanted hypnotic suggestions during his recovery—and they want him to spy on Puerto Rican groups. She also shocks him when she explains that in fact he is 100% Puerto Rican himself, and warns him that her agency is everywhere and can be quite ruthless. He leaves in the middle of the night, shakes off a police tail, ends up at his apartment, where he finds Chota threatening to rape and murder Soto. Together, they disarm and kill Chota.

Desperate, they seek out Garboil's friend, the writer Ed Vega. He knows all about them, and confirms Garboil is indeed Puerto Rican. He explains that they should disappear in plain sight, become respectable, turn down the ethnic volume, and fight the system from inside. And as their "maker", he can make it happen. They agree, and as they turn in to his spare bedroom, Vega heads to his typewriter.

== Reception ==
The novel was reviewed in Bilingual Review/La Revista Bilingüe, which found it uneven.

== Critical review ==
- Paravisni-Gebert, Lizabeth (1996). "Patterns of Dominance in Puerto Rican Literature: A Historical Overview" (PDF). In Ashcraft-Eason, Lillian (ed.). Inside Ethnic America: An Ethnic Studies Reader. Kendall/Hunt. pp. 143–63.
- de Posada, David (2004). "Edgardo Vega Yunqué (1936– )". In West-Durán, Alan (ed.). Latino and Latina Writers 2. Scribner writers series. Charles Scribner's Sons. pp. 1019–30.
- Avalos, Hector (2005). Strangers in Our Own Land: Religion In Contemporary U.S. Latina/o Literature. Abingdon Press. pp. 163–8.
  - Avalos stresses Vega's criticisms of religions.

The novel was also analyzed in two doctoral theses.
