= Book & a Cover =

1998 song by Suzanne Vega

Single by Suzanne Vega

from the album Tried & True: The Best of Suzanne Vega
- Released: November 3, 1998
- Length: 3:49
- Label: A&M
- Songwriter(s): Suzanne Vega
- Producer(s): Mitchell Froom; Tchad Blake

Suzanne Vega singles chronology
"Birth-day" (1997)	"Book & a Cover" (1998)	"Rosemary (Remember Me)" (1999)

Music video
- "Book & a Cover" on YouTube

"Book & a Cover" is a song by American singer-songwriter Suzanne Vega, which was released in 1998 as a single from her compilation album Tried & True: The Best of Suzanne Vega. The song was written by Vega, and produced by Mitchell Froom and Tchad Blake.

== Background ==
"Book & a Cover" was one of two new songs to be recorded in 1998 and included on Vega's Tried & True: The Best of Suzanne Vega compilation album. The song was recorded and mixed at the Magic Shop in New York City. "Book & Cover" was released as the first single from Tried & True: The Best of Suzanne Vega in November 1998, followed by the other new song, "Rosemary (Remember Me)", in 1999.

For the 40th week in 1998 (September 28 to October 4), "Book & a Cover" was one of eleven tracks identified by Music & Media as being the "most added" to radio playlists across Europe. In the UK, BBC Radio 2 added the song to their B-List. The song reached No. 5 on the Music & Media "Major Market Airplay" chart for Poland in October 1998.

Speaking of the song's message in 1998, Vega described it as "fairly obvious" and "about not judging people by their appearance". The song's music video was directed by Geoff Moore and produced by Frank Linkoff for Black Dog Films.

== Critical reception ==
Paul Sexton of Music & Media described "Book & a Cover" as "accessible". In a review of Tried & True: The Best of Suzanne Vega, Ted Mills of AllMusic praised the song as a "quality entry in Vega's songbook". Mike Devlin of the Times Colonist noted, "By including 15 of her best songs along with two new tracks, 'Book & a Cover' and 'Rosemary', this fine songstress shines strictly for the masses this time out." Diego Perugini of the Italian newspaper l'Unità described "Book & a Cover" and "Rosemary" as "two fresh, essential, melodic pieces".

== Track listing ==
CD single

1. "Book & a Cover" – 3:49
2. "Tom's Diner" – 2:09
3. "As Girls Go" – 3:26
4. "Cracking" – 2:47

CD single (German release)

1. "Book & a Cover" – 3:49
2. "Tom's Diner" – 2:09

CD single (UK promo)

1. "Book & a Cover" – 3:49

== Personnel ==
Book & a Cover

- Suzanne Vega – vocals, acoustic guitar
- Pete Thomas – drums
- Ron Sexsmith – electric guitar
- Mitchell Froom – keyboards

Production

- Mitchell Froom – producer on "Book & a Cover" and "As Girls Go"
- Tchad Blake – producer on "Book & a Cover", recording and mixing on "Book & a Cover" and "As Girls Go"
- Lenny Kaye – producer of "Tom's Diner" and "Cracking"
- Steve Addabbo – producer and engineer on "Tom's Diner" and "Cracking"
- Rod O'Brien – engineer on "Tom's Diner"
- Shelly Yakus – mixing on "Tom's Diner"
