= Blood Makes Noise =

1992 single by Suzanne Vega

Single by Suzanne Vega

from the album 99.9F°
- B-side: "Bad Wisdom"
- Released: August 1992
- Genre: Industrial rock
- Length: 2:28
- Label: A&M
- Songwriter: Suzanne Vega
- Producer: Mitchell Froom

Suzanne Vega singles chronology
"99.9F°" (1992)	"Blood Makes Noise" (1992)	"In Liverpool" (1992)

Music video
- "Blood Makes Noise" on YouTube

"Blood Makes Noise" is a song written and performed by American singer-songwriter Suzanne Vega. It was released in August 1992 by A&M Records as the second single from her fourth studio album, 99.9F° (1992). It was produced by Mitchell Froom and debuted at number 14 on the US Billboard Modern Rock Tracks chart, where it reached number one a month later. In the UK, it reached number 60 on the UK singles chart. The accompanying music video was directed by German film director Nico Beyer.

== Content ==
The song is notable for its clangy percussion, which has been compared to industrial music. Vega said that the percussion was meant to recreate the sounds the "blood makes" in someone's head when someone's afraid and that she had never heard of industrial music. The song doesn't clarify what the fear is in response to, but some have argued the song is about a patient taking a HIV/AIDS test. Suzanne Vega has denied this; in a 2001 interview with The A.V. Club, she says she likes "to take a moment out of its context. It makes you identify with it, without knowing why. In a way, its kind of eerie, because it means you can hear the song, identify with it, and not really know what the circumstances are. And in some ways, that's more satisfying to me."

== Music video ==
The music video for "Blood Makes Noise" was directed by German film director Nico Beyer. It was added to MTV the week of August 29, 1992. The video was featured on Beavis and Butt-Head. The song was also featured on an episode of Homicide: Life on the Street as well as Dexter: Resurrection.

== Charts ==
=== Weekly charts ===
Weekly chart performance for "Blood Makes Noise"
Chart (1992–1993)	Peak position
Australia (ARIA)	61
Canada Top Singles (RPM)	63
New Zealand (Recorded Music NZ)	42
UK Singles (Official Charts)	60
UK Airplay (Music Week)	26
UK Club Chart (Music Week)	47
US Alternative Airplay (Billboard)	1

=== Year-end charts ===
Year-end chart performance for "Blood Makes Noise"
Chart (1992)	Position
US Modern Rock Tracks (Billboard)	13

== Release history ==
Release dates and formats for "Blood Makes Noise"
Region	Date	Format(s)	Label(s)	Ref.
United States	August 1992	Cassette	A&M	
Australia	September 14, 1992	CD; cassette	A&M	
Japan	September 26, 1992	Mini CD	A&M	
United Kingdom	December 7, 1992	7-inch vinyl; 12-inch vinyl; CD; cassette	A&M	
