= No Cheap Thrill =

1996 song by Suzanne Vega

Single by Suzanne Vega

from the album Nine Objects of Desire
- B-side: "Luka"
- Released: 1996
- Recorded: Magic Shop (New York, NY)
- Genre: Pop
- Length: 3:09
- Label: A&M
- Songwriter: Suzanne Vega
- Producer: Mitchell Froom

Suzanne Vega singles chronology
"Caramel" (1996)	"No Cheap Thrill" (1996)	"Headshots" (1997)

Music video
- "No Cheap Thrill" on YouTube

"No Cheap Thrill" is a song by American singer-songwriter Suzanne Vega, which was released in 1996 as the second single from her fifth studio album, Nine Objects of Desire (1996). It was written by Vega and produced by Mitchell Froom. "No Cheap Thrill" reached number 40 in the UK Singles Chart in February 1997, giving Vega her fifth and final UK top 40 hit.

== Background ==
Vega has described "No Cheap Thrill" as "a song about romance using the language of gambling".

== Music video ==
The song's music video was directed by David Cameron.

== Critical reception ==
Upon its release as single, Larry Flick of Billboard considered it to be a "shining moment" from Nine Objects of Desire. He commented, "Vega's vocals are sewn into a short and direct rock beat that is frayed at the edges with gnarly guitars and ambient keyboards. All the while, the song's bright and peppy hook grab[s] the ear and never let[s] go." Pan-European magazine Music & Media described it as an "excellent mid-tempo track with plenty of radio appeal". They praised Froom for "diversifying Vega's folkie feel by introducing tempo changes, weird background stuff and providing a great base for her soft voice". A reviewer from Music Week rated it four out of five, adding, "A poppy lead single to Vega's forthcoming boundary-blurring album. This will delight early fans and intrigue those won over by the Tom's Diner remixes."

In a review of the Nine Objects of Desire, J. D. Considine of The Baltimore Sun noted that the song "flirts with calypso rhythms throughout its Runyonesque verse". Jeff Hall of the Courier-Post described it as "engaging barbed pop". Dan Kening of The Daily Herald commented, "The ultra-catchy 'No Cheap Thrill' compares a poker game to a seduction."

== Track listing ==
- CD single
1. "No Cheap Thrill" – 3:09
2. "Luka" – 3:51
3. "Marlene on the Wall" – 3:39
4. "Tom's Diner" – 2:09
- CD single (European release #2)
1. "No Cheap Thrill" – 3:09
2. "Luka" – 3:51
- CD single (UK promo)
1. "No Cheap Thrill" (Radio Version) – 2:49
- CD single (US promo)
1. "No Cheap Thrill" (LP Version) – 3:09
- CD single (US promo #2)
1. "No Cheap Thrill" (U.S. Edit) – 3:00
2. "No Cheap Thrill" (U.K. Edit) – 2:49
3. "No Cheap Thrill" (LP Version) – 3:09

== Personnel ==
No Cheap Thrill

- Suzanne Vega – vocals, guitar
- Pete Thomas, Jerry Marotta – drums, percussion
- Bruce Thomas, Sebastian Steinberg – bass
- Steve Donnelly, Tchad Blake – electric guitar
- Don Byron – clarinet, bass clarinet
- Dave Douglas – trumpets
- Jane Scarpantoni – cellos
- Cecilia Sparacio – flutes
- Mitchell Froom – keyboards

Production

- Mitchell Froom – producer of "No Cheap Thrill"
- Tchad Blake – recording and mixing on "No Cheap Thrill"
- Joe Warda – assistant recording engineer on "No Cheap Thrill"
- John Paterno, S. Husky Höskulds – assistant mixing engineers on "No Cheap Thrill"
- Bob Ludwig – mastering on "No Cheap Thrill"
- Lenny Kaye – producer of "Luka", "Marlene on the Wall" and "Tom's Diner"
- Steve Addabbo – producer and engineer on "Luka", "Marlene on the Wall" and "Tom's Diner"
- Rod O'Brien – engineer on "Luka" and "Tom's Diner"
- Shelly Yakus – mixing on "Luka" and "Tom's Diner"

== Charts ==
Chart (1996–97)	Peak position
Australia (ARIA)	155
UK Singles (OCC)	40
US Adult Alternative Airplay (Billboard)	12
