= Solitude Standing =

Studio album by Suzanne Vega
- Released: April 1987
- Recorded: September 1986 – January 1987
- Studios: Bearsville (Woodstock); RPM (New York); Carnegie Hill (New York); A&M (Hollywood); Celestial Sound (New York)
- Genres: Alternative rock; folk rock; folk pop
- Length: 42:20
- Label: A&M
- Producers: Steve Addabbo; Lenny Kaye

Suzanne Vega chronology
Suzanne Vega (1985)	Solitude Standing (1987)	Days of Open Hand (1990)

Singles from Solitude Standing
- 1. "Gypsy" Released: October 1986; 2. "Luka" Released: May 1987; 3. "Tom's Diner" Released: June 1987; 4. "Solitude Standing" Released: August 1987

Solitude Standing is the second studio album by American singer-songwriter Suzanne Vega, released in April 1987, by A&M Records. It is the most commercially successful and critically acclaimed album of Vega's career, being certified Platinum in the U.S. and UK. It reached number 11 on the Billboard 200, and number 2 on the UK Album Chart.

== Overview ==
"Tom's Diner" was included twice on the album; the a cappella version was the first track, and the instrumental version was the last track. In 1990, a remixed version of the song by English electronic music producers DNA reached number five in the U.S. and number one in the UK. The song was later used to test prototype MP3 compression software. "Night Vision" was inspired by the poem "Juan Gris" by French poet Paul Éluard. "Calypso" is based on the Odyssey, namely the part in which Calypso is forced to let Odysseus go. "Gypsy" is mentioned in the book The Perks of Being a Wallflower (1999) by Stephen Chbosky, in which the main character Charlie includes it on one of his mixtapes. Vega once stated she wrote "Gypsy" when she was only 18 years old (which would be 1977/78).

== Critical reception ==
Professional ratings
Review scores
Source	Rating
AllMusic	4.5/5 stars
Los Angeles Times	3.5/4 stars
Orlando Sentinel	4/5 stars
The Philadelphia Inquirer	4/4 stars
The Rolling Stone Album Guide	3.5/5 stars
Sounds	4.5/5 stars
Uncut	8/10
The Village Voice	C+

In Rolling Stone, David Browne said that the mixture of older and newer compositions on Solitude Standing resulted in an album "shakier and less focused" than Vega's eponymous debut studio album, but also one that "unwittingly shows where Vega has been and where she's going", concluding that with her "growth as a singer and writer", she "has managed to beat the sophomore jinx while giving the singer-songwriter a good name once again." People called it an "elegantly crafted, alarmingly accessible" record whose production provides Vega "enough room to profit from the pop grooves on the album without weakening her strength as a folkie."

Retrospectively, AllMusic critic William Ruhlmann deemed Solitude Standing a "triumph" and attributed its artistic success to "its diversity", noting that Vega had crafted "an album of story songs set in a variety of musical contexts" and "developed more as a singer without losing the focused intonation that had made her debut".

== 25th anniversary ==
In 2012, to mark the 25th anniversary of the album's release, Vega played four celebratory concerts in which the album was performed in its entirety. The first was in Copley Square, Boston on July 28; the second and third were at City Winery in Hudson Square, New York City on October 9 (7pm and 10pm shows); and the fourth at London's Barbican Theatre on October 16.

A limited-edition two-CD set, titled Solitude Standing: Live at the Barbican, was produced by Concert Live and made available for purchase instantly after the final show, as well as online.

== Track listing ==
Side one
No.	Title	Writer(s)	Length
1.	"Tom's Diner"	Suzanne Vega	2:09
2.	"Luka"	Vega	3:52
3.	"Ironbound/Fancy Poultry"	Vega; Anton Sanko	6:19
4.	"In the Eye"	Vega; Marc Shulman	4:16
5.	"Night Vision"	Vega; Sanko	2:47
Total length:			19:23

Side two
No.	Title	Writer(s)	Length
1.	"Solitude Standing"	Vega; Michael Visceglia; Sanko; Shulman; Stephen Ferrera	4:49
2.	"Calypso"	Vega	4:14
3.	"Language"	Vega; Visceglia	3:57
4.	"Gypsy"	Vega	4:04
5.	"Wooden Horse (Caspar Hauser's Song)"	Vega; Visceglia; Sanko; Shulman; Ferrera	5:13
6.	"Tom's Diner (Reprise)"	Vega	2:40
Total length:			24:57

== Personnel ==
- Suzanne Vega – vocals, acoustic guitar
- Marc Shulman – electric guitars
- Anton Sanko – synthesizers, classical guitar on 5
- Michael Visceglia – bass guitar, additional synthesizer on 11
- Stephen Ferrera – drums, percussion

Additional personnel

- Shawn Colvin – backing vocals on 2
- Mitch Easter – rhythm guitar on 9
- Steve Addabbo – guitar on 9
- Frank Christian – electric guitar on 9
- Jon Gordon – guitar solo on 2
- Sue Evans – percussion on 7, drums on 9

Production

- Steve Addabbo – producer, engineer
- Lenny Kaye – producer
- Mitch Easter – producer on 9
- Ronald K. Fierstein – executive producer
- Rod O'Brien – engineer
- Shelly Yakus – mixing
- Jeffrey Gold – art direction
- Melanie Nissen – art direction, design
- Paula Bullwinkel – cover photography

== Charts ==
=== Weekly charts ===
Weekly chart performance for Solitude Standing
Chart (1987)	Peak position
Australian Albums (Kent Music Report)	7
Austrian Albums (Ö3 Austria)	3
Canada Top Albums/CDs (RPM)	5
Dutch Albums (Album Top 100)	14
European Albums (Music & Media)	6
Finnish Albums (Suomen virallinen lista)	3
French Albums (IFOP)	18
German Albums (Offizielle Top 100)	6
Icelandic Albums (Tónlist)	7
New Zealand Albums (RMNZ)	1
Norwegian Albums (VG-lista)	2
Swedish Albums (Sverigetopplistan)	1
Swiss Albums (Schweizer Hitparade)	8
UK Albums (Official Charts)	2
US Billboard 200	11

=== Year-end charts ===
Year-end chart performance for Solitude Standing
Chart (1987)	Position
Australian Albums (Kent Music Report)	22
Austrian Albums (Ö3 Austria)	9
Canada Top Albums/CDs (RPM)	19
Dutch Albums (Album Top 100)	69
European Albums (Music & Media)	16
German Albums (Offizielle Top 100)	19
New Zealand Albums (RMNZ)	12
Norwegian Summer Period Albums (VG-lista)	1
Swiss Albums (Schweizer Hitparade)	23
UK Albums (Gallup)	27
US Billboard 200	61

== Certifications and sales ==
Certifications and sales for Solitude Standing
Region	Certification	Certified units/sales
Australia (ARIA)	Gold	25,000
Brazil	—	50,000
Canada (Music Canada)	Platinum	100,000^{^}
France (SNEP)	2× Gold	200,000^{*}
Germany (BVMI)	Gold	250,000^{^}
Hong Kong (IFPI Hong Kong)	Gold	10,000^{*}
Norway (IFPI Norway)	Gold	50,000
New Zealand (RMNZ)	Platinum	15,000^{^}
Singapore	—	12,000
Spain (Promusicae)	Gold	50,000^{^}
Sweden (GLF)	Gold	50,000^{^}
United Kingdom (BPI)	Platinum	300,000^{^}
United States (RIAA)	Platinum	1,000,000^{^}
Summaries
Worldwide	—	5,000,000
^{*} Sales figures based on certification alone.^{^} Shipments figures based on certification alone.
