= Caramel (Suzanne Vega song) =

1996 song by Suzanne Vega

Single by Suzanne Vega

from the album Nine Objects of Desire
- B-side: "Small Blue Thing"
- Released: 1996
- Studio: Magic Shop (New York, NY)
- Genre: Bossa nova
- Length: 3:09
- Label: A&M
- Songwriter(s): Suzanne Vega
- Producer(s): Mitchell Froom

Suzanne Vega singles chronology
"When Heroes Go Down" (1993)	"Caramel" (1996)	"No Cheap Thrill" (1996)

Music video
- "Caramel" on YouTube

"Caramel" is a song by American singer-songwriter Suzanne Vega, which was released in 1996 as the lead single from her fifth studio album Nine Objects of Desire and featured in the American romantic comedy film The Truth About Cats & Dogs. The song was written by Vega and produced by Mitchell Froom. The song's music video was directed by Charles Wittenmeier.

== Background ==
"Caramel" was influenced by the Bossa nova music of the 1960s, which Vega grew up listening to. In a 1997 interview for Power Music Network, Vega said, "'Caramel' was intended to be one of those old fashioned songs, like "The Girl from Ipanema," or what Astrud Gilberto would sing. I used to really love that kind of music when I was a teenager." Until "Caramel", Vega had consciously avoided writing in such a style because "I didn't want the music to be corny" and "I came up in the '80s during the new wave when rhythms were all so English-influenced." Lyrically, Vega has described "Caramel" as being "about longing and wishing for something you know you really shouldn't have", with 'caramel' being "the metaphor for the thing you long for, but you shouldn't really touch".

Prior to its release on Nine Objects of Desire, "Caramel" was featured in the film The Truth About Cats & Dogs, and its accompanying soundtrack release, in April 1996. Vega recalled of being approached by the filmmakers and the subsequent decision to use "Caramel" in the film, "When I saw the scene, I thought 'Caramel' would be the right song. I had written the basic idea of the song already and we were in the process of recording it when I got that phone call. So we then adjusted some of the song so it would fit the movie." From A&M Records' perspective, the use of "Caramel" in the film was a way of reintroducing Vega after her three year absence from the music scene. In the US and UK, "Caramel" was released as a promotional single from the soundtrack, and then as a single in Europe from Nine Objects of Desire. The song was also used in the trailer for the 2004 American romantic drama film Closer.

== Critical reception ==
On its release, Larry Flick of Billboard commented, "This soft-served morsel shows Vega in rare form as she whips up a sultry, lounge-ish tune that drips with her soft warm vocals. Excellent arrangement has subdued horns, strings and bongos." In a review of Nine Objects of Desire, Daina Darzin of Cash Box considered the song to "sidle up to an almost Latin vibe and mellifluous orchestration". Elysa Gardner of the Los Angeles Times wrote, "'Caramel' has a bossa nova feel, with lilting flutes and muted trumpets adding nuance."

Craig S. Palosky of The Tampa Tribune commented, "The delicate 'Caramel' turns a forbidden attraction into a sensual slow dance." L. Kent Wolgamott of the Lincoln Journal Star noted the song "goes into the cocktail lounge to explore forbidden longing". Dave Hansen of The Daily Utah Chronicle wrote, "'Caramel' sounds like something one would hear coming from the cantina on The Love Boat with a slinky seductress on the microphone. Vega's refreshing voice and simple guitar make this song a soothing pleasure."

== Track listing ==
CD single (European release)

1. "Caramel" (LP Version) – 2:55
2. "Small Blue Thing" – 3:54

CD single (European release #2)

1. "Caramel" (LP Version) – 2:55
2. "Luka" (Spanish Version) – 3:49
3. "Story of Isaac" – 4:08
4. "As Girls Go" – 3:25

CD single (UK promo)

1. "Caramel" (LP Version) – 2:55

CD single (US promo)

1. "Caramel" – 2:55

== Personnel ==
Caramel

- Suzanne Vega – vocals
- Steve Donnelly – electric guitar
- Pete Thomas, Jerry Marotta – drums, percussion
- Bruce Thomas – bass
- Don Byron – clarinets
- Dave Douglas – muted trumpets
- Cecilia Sparacio – flutes
- Mitchell Froom – keyboards, horn arrangement

Production

- Mitchell Froom – producer of "Caramel", "Story of Isaac" and "As Girls Go"
- Tchad Blake – recording and mixing on "Caramel", "Story of Isaac" and "As Girls Go"
- Steve Addabbo, Lenny Kaye – producers of "Luka" and "Small Blue Thing"
- Joe Warda – assistant recording engineer on "Caramel"
- John Paterno, S. Husky Höskulds – assistant mixing engineers on "Caramel"
- Bob Ludwig – mastering on "Caramel"

Other

- Jeri Heiden – art direction
- Albert Sanchez – photography
