= Nine Objects of Desire =

Studio album by Suzanne Vega
- Released: September 10, 1996
- Studio: Magic Shop, New York City
- Genre: Folk; alternative rock
- Length: 38:52
- Label: A&M
- Producer: Mitchell Froom

Suzanne Vega chronology
99.9F° (1992)	Nine Objects of Desire (1996)	Tried & True: The Best of Suzanne Vega (1998)

Singles from Nine Objects of Desire
- 1. "Caramel" Released: April 1996; 2. "No Cheap Thrill" Released: November 12, 1996; 3. "World Before Columbus" Released: April 1997

Professional ratings
Review scores
Source	Rating
AllMusic	3/5 stars
Billboard	(favorable)
Entertainment Weekly	A
Music Week	5/5 stars
Pitchfork	7.4/10
Rolling Stone	4/5 stars

Nine Objects of Desire is the fifth studio album by American singer-songwriter Suzanne Vega, released on September 10, 1996, through A&M Records. As with her previous album 99.9F° (1992), it was produced by her then-husband Mitchell Froom (who also co-wrote three tracks). The recording sessions took place at The Magic Shop in New York City.

Much like its predecessor, Nine Objects of Desire integrates experimental instrumentation and arrangements into Vega's signature sound. Elements of jazz are present on tracks such as "Caramel" and "Tombstone". High-profile contributors to the album include Tchad Blake on guitar, Jerry Marotta on drums, and members of Elvis Costello's backing band the Attractions.

Nine Objects of Desire peaked at number 92 in the US, continuing a downward trend in Vega's album sales throughout the 1990s. However, it received positive reviews from critics, many of whom praised the songwriting and production. It spawned a UK top 40 hit in "No Cheap Thrill".

== Music and lyrics ==
Nine Objects of Desire features experimental production and arrangements, though to a lesser extent than its predecessor. Driven by what Vega described as "sensual" rhythms, the album incorporates elements of bossa nova and alternative rock. Lyrically, the album takes a more personal turn in comparison to Vega's other albums, forgoing character pieces and instead taking heavy inspiration from her personal life.

"Birth-day (Love Made Real)" refers to the birth of Vega's daughter Ruby. "Caramel" was heavily influenced by bossa nova, particularly the music of Astrud Gilberto. The lyrics were inspired by a passing crush on a friend, and was arranged to have an "Antônio Carlos Jobim feel". Vega has stated it is one of the songs of which she is most proud.

== Track listing ==
All tracks are written by Suzanne Vega except "Headshots", "Casual Match", and "Lolita", the music of which are written with Mitchell Froom.

Nine Objects of Desire
No.	Title	Length
1.	"Birth-day (Love Made Real)"	3:36
2.	"Headshots"	3:07
3.	"Caramel"	2:53
4.	"Stockings"	3:31
5.	"Casual Match"	3:10
6.	"Thin Man"	3:38
7.	"No Cheap Thrill"	3:09
8.	"World Before Columbus"	3:26
9.	"Lolita"	3:34
10.	"Honeymoon Suite"	2:56
11.	"Tombstone"	3:04
12.	"My Favorite Plum"	2:48
Total length:		38:52

== Personnel ==
- Suzanne Vega – vocals, riff guitar (1, 7), acoustic guitar (4, 6–8, 10), electric guitar (4)
- Mitchell Froom – keyboards, Moog bass (6), horn arrangements (6), string arrangements (12)
- Tchad Blake – guitar (3, 7, 10, 11), whistle sample (2), effects (5), mixing (throughout)
- Steve Donnelly – guitar (1–3, 6–9, 11, 12)
- Dave Douglas – trumpet (7, 9), muted trumpets (3, 6)
- Don Byron – clarinet (3, 7), bass clarinet (7)
- Jane Scarpantoni – cello (7, 12)
- Mark Feldman, Jane Scarpantoni, Matthew Pierce, Ted Falcon – string section (4)
- Cecilia Sparacio – flutes (3, 5, 7, 9)
- Sebastian Steinberg – bass (7), acoustic bass (4, 10–12)
- Bruce Thomas – bass (1–3, 5, 7–9)
- Yuval Gabay – drums (10)
- Jerry Marotta – drums (1, 3–7, 9–12), percussion (1, 3–5, 7, 9, 12)
- Pete Thomas – drums (1–3, 7–9, 12), drum loop (5), percussion (1, 3, 6–9, 12)

== Charts ==
Chart (1996)	Peak position
Australian Albums (ARIA)	113
Austrian Albums (Ö3 Austria)	25
Belgian Albums (Ultratop Flanders)	42
Belgian Albums (Ultratop Wallonia)	13
Dutch Albums (Album Top 100)	93
Finnish Albums (Suomen virallinen lista)	20
French Albums (SNEP)	25
German Albums (Media Control Charts)	43
Norwegian Albums (VG-lista)	24
Swedish Albums (Sverigetopplistan)	39
Swiss Albums (Schweizer Hitparade)	23
UK Albums (OCC)	43
US Billboard 200	92
Scottish Albums (OCC)	60
