= Suzanne Vega (album) =

Studio album by Suzanne Vega
- Released: May 1, 1985
- Recorded: November 1984 – March 1985
- Studio: Celestial Sound (New York City)
- Genre: Folk rock
- Length: 35:37
- Label: A&M
- Producers: Steve Addabbo; Lenny Kaye

Suzanne Vega chronology
Suzanne Vega (1985)	Solitude Standing (1987)

Singles from Suzanne Vega
- 1. "Marlene on the Wall" Released: 1985 (re-release in 1986); 2. "Knight Moves" Released: 1985 (Germany); 3. "Small Blue Thing" Released: 1986 (UK)

Suzanne Vega is the debut studio album by American singer-songwriter Suzanne Vega, released on May 1, 1985, by A&M Records. The album was primarily recorded at Celestial Sound in New York City and was produced by Steve Addabbo and Lenny Kaye.

The album's folk-style and stripped-back arrangements deviated from the prevailing trends of the time, and helped to usher in a new era of singer-songwriters. Suzanne Vega was a critical success and helped Vega's rise to popularity. The album surpassed sales expectations by selling over 200,000 copies in the US and was certified platinum in the UK for sales of over 300,000 copies.

"Marlene on the Wall", "Small Blue Thing" and "Knight Moves" were released as singles to promote the album, with the former becoming a top 30 hit on the UK singles chart upon a re-release in 1986. The album itself reached the top 20 on the UK Albums Chart. It would later be placed at number 80 in Rolling Stone's list of the "100 Best Albums of the Eighties".

== Commercial performance ==
Suzanne Vega exceeded both A&M and Vega's expectations by selling over 200,000 copies in the US. The album would peak at number 91 on the Billboard 200. It was even more successful in the UK, where sales numbers exceeded 300,000 and the album reached number 11.

"Marlene on the Wall" was released as the album's first single. Upon its original release, the song stalled at number 83 on the UK singles chart. However, after being re-released in 1986, it reached a new peak of number 21, becoming her highest-charting song in that country and one of her biggest hits. The album's second single, "Small Blue Thing", peaked at number 65 in the UK.

== Critical reception ==
Professional ratings
Review scores
Source	Rating
AllMusic	4/5 stars
The Encyclopedia of Popular Music	4/5 stars
The Rolling Stone Album Guide	3/5 stars
The Village Voice	B−

Gary Kenton, in Spin, wrote, "Vega can get a bit pretentious, but what singer-songwriter worth a damn doesn't? It's the price you pay for taking risks. Suzanne Vega is a flattering and very substantial introduction."

== Track listing ==
All tracks written by Suzanne Vega.

Side one

1. "Cracking" – 2:49
2. "Freeze Tag" – 2:36
3. "Marlene on the Wall" – 3:40
4. "Small Blue Thing" – 3:54
5. "Straight Lines" – 3:49

Side two

1. "Undertow" – 3:26
2. "Some Journey" – 3:38
3. "The Queen and the Soldier" – 4:48
4. "Knight Moves" – 3:36
5. "Neighborhood Girls" – 3:21

== Personnel ==
Credits adapted from the album liner notes:

- Suzanne Vega – vocals, acoustic guitar
- Steve Addabbo — background vocals (4, 5, 7), Synclavier guitar (6), 12-string acoustic guitar (8), electric guitar (10)
- Darol Anger – electric violin (7)
- Frank Christian – acoustic guitar (2, 9), electric slide guitar (10)
- Paul Dugan – bass (1, 4, 6, 8, 9), vertical bass (2)
- Sue Evans – drums (3, 5, 6, 10), percussion (4, 10)
- Jon Gordon – electric guitar (1–7)
- Peter Gordon – string arrangement (6)
- Frank Gravis – bass (3, 5, 10)
- Shem Guibbory – violin (6)
- Mark Isham – synthesizers (7)
- John Mahoney – Synclavier programming (6)
- Maxine Neuman – cello (6)
- C.P. Roth – synthesizers (1–5, 9), piano (8), organ (8)
- Roger Squitero – percussion (7)

== Charts ==
=== Weekly charts ===
Weekly chart performance for Suzanne Vega
Chart (1985–1986)	Peak position
Australian Albums (Kent Music Report)	23
Dutch Albums (Album Top 100)	11
European Albums (Music & Media)	61
Finnish Albums (Suomen virallinen lista)	34
German Albums (Offizielle Top 100)	54
New Zealand Albums (RMNZ)	9
Swedish Albums (Sverigetopplistan)	42
UK Albums (Official Charts)	11
US Billboard 200	91

=== Year-end charts ===
1985 year-end chart performance for Suzanne Vega
Chart (1985)	Position
Dutch Albums (Album Top 100)	98

1986 year-end chart performance for Suzanne Vega
Chart (1986)	Position
Australian Albums (Kent Music Report)	52
European Albums (Music & Media)	76
New Zealand Albums (RMNZ)	44
UK Albums (Gallup)	46

== Certifications and sales ==
Certifications and sales for Suzanne Vega
Region	Certification	Certified units/sales
New Zealand (RMNZ)	Gold	7,500^{^}
United Kingdom (BPI)	Platinum	300,000^{^}
United States	—	250,000
Summaries
Worldwide	—	2,000,000
^{^} Shipments figures based on certification alone.
