= 99.9F° =

Studio album by Suzanne Vega
- Released: September 7, 1992
- Recorded: February–June 1992
- Studios: Dreamland (Hurley, New York); The Sound Factory (Los Angeles, California); Magic Shop (SoHo, Manhattan)
- Genres: Alternative rock; folk rock
- Length: 37:20
- Label: A&M
- Producer: Mitchell Froom

Suzanne Vega chronology
| Days of Open Hand (1990) | 99.9F° (1992) | Nine Objects of Desire (1996) |

Singles from 99.9F°
- 1. "In Liverpool" Released: August 1992; 2. "99.9F°" Released: October 1992; 3. "Blood Makes Noise" Released: December 1992; 4. "When Heroes Go Down" Released: February 1993

99.9F° (pronounced Ninety-Nine Point Nine Fahrenheit Degrees) is the fourth studio album by American singer-songwriter Suzanne Vega. Released on September 7, 1992, by A&M Records, the album marked a departure for Vega, as she embraced a more electronic, experimental sound. It peaked at No. 86 on the U.S. Billboard 200 and was Vega's fourth Top 20 album on the UK Albums Chart. The single "Blood Makes Noise" reached number one on the Billboard Modern Rock Tracks chart. 99.9F° was the first of two of Vega's albums to be produced by Mitchell Froom, whom she later married.

The album was certified gold (500,000 copies sold) by the RIAA in October 1997. It was certified silver in the UK (60,000 copies sold) by the BPI in March 1993. Vega has referred to 99.9F° as her favorite of her studio albums.

== Critical reception ==
Professional ratings
Review scores
| Source | Rating |
|---|---|
| AllMusic | 3/5 stars |
| Calgary Herald | A |
| The Encyclopedia of Popular Music | 3/5 stars |
| Entertainment Weekly | A |
| MusicHound Rock: The Essential Album Guide | 3/5 stars |
| Rolling Stone | 3.5/5 stars |
| The Rolling Stone Album Guide | 2.5/5 stars |

The New York Times wrote: "By far Vega's most rewarding record, 99.9 F degrees ... is the first album in which she breaks almost completely away from the conventions of the New York folk milieu that nurtured her." Trouser Press wrote that "many of the songs display a new interest in space and sound, using both in an almost sculptural fashion, creating a compelling amalgam that industrializes folk music."

== Track listing ==
All tracks are written by Suzanne Vega, except where noted.

99.9F° track listing
| No. | Title | Writer(s) | Length |
|---|---|---|---|
| 1. | "Rock in This Pocket (Song of David)" | | 3:31 |
| 2. | "Blood Makes Noise" | | 2:28 |
| 3. | "In Liverpool" | | 4:41 |
| 4. | "99.9F°" | | 3:15 |
| 5. | "Blood Sings" | | 3:18 |
| 6. | "Fat Man and Dancing Girl" | Vega; Mitchell Froom | 2:18 |
| 7. | "(If You Were) In My Movie" | | 3:06 |
| 8. | "As a Child" | | 2:56 |
| 9. | "Bad Wisdom" | | 3:22 |
| 10. | "When Heroes Go Down" | | 1:54 |
| 11. | "As Girls Go" | | 3:26 |
| 12. | "Song of Sand" | Vega; Nils Petter Molvær | 3:05 |
| Total length: | | | 37:20 |

Bonus track (Europe and Japan)
| No. | Title | Length |
|---|---|---|
| 13. | "Private Goes Public" | 1:56 |
| Total length: | | 39:16 |

== Personnel ==
- Suzanne Vega – vocals, acoustic guitar
- Mitchell Froom – keyboards, string arrangement on 12
- Tchad Blake – electric guitar on 3, 4, 6, 10
- David Hidalgo – electric guitar on 1, 2, 3, 4, 7, 8, 11
- Bruce Thomas – bass guitar
- Jerry Marotta – drums, percussion

Additional personnel

- Richard Pleasance – electric guitar on 1, 3, 10
- Michael Visceglia – fretless bass guitar on 5
- Richard Thompson – guitar solo on 11
- Greg Smith – baritone saxophone on 8, 11
- Jerry Scheff – double bass on 6, 12
- Marc Shulman – bouzouki on 5
- Sid Page – 1st violin on 12
- Joel Derouin – 2nd violin on 12
- Maria Newman – viola on 12
- Larry Corbett – cello on 12
- Suzie Katayama – copyist on 12

Technical

- Ronald K. Fierstein – executive producer
- Tchad Blake – engineer, mixing
- Len Peltier, Suzanne Vega – art direction

== Charts ==
Chart performance for 99.9F°
| Chart (1992) | Peak position |
|---|---|
| Australian Albums (ARIA) | 56 |
| Dutch Albums (MegaCharts) | 70 |
| German Albums (Media Control) | 27 |
| New Zealand Albums (Recorded Music NZ) | 38 |
| Swedish Albums (Sverigetopplistan) | 45 |
| Swiss Albums (Schweizer Hitparade) | 24 |
| UK Albums (Official Charts) | 20 |
| US Billboard 200 | 86 |
| Finnish Albums (The Official Finnish Charts) | 5 |
| European Albums (Eurotipsheet) | 33 |
| US Cash Box Top 200 Albums | 83 |

=== Singles ===
| Year | Single | Chart | Peak position |
|---|---|---|---|
| 1992 | "99.9F°" | UK Singles (OCC) | 46 |
| 1992 | "99.9F°" | US Alternative Songs (Billboard) | 13 |
| 1992 | "Blood Makes Noise" | Canada Top Singles (RPM) | 63 |
| 1992 | "Blood Makes Noise" | New Zealand (RIANZ) | 42 |
| 1992 | "Blood Makes Noise" | UK Singles (OCC) | 60 |
| 1992 | "Blood Makes Noise" | US Alternative Songs (Billboard) | 1 |
| 1992 | "In Liverpool" | UK Singles (OCC) | 52 |
| 1993 | "When Heroes Go Down" | UK Singles (OCC) | 58 |

== Certifications and sales ==
| Region | Certification | Certified units/sales |
|---|---|---|
| United Kingdom (BPI) | Silver | 60,000^{^} |
| United States (RIAA) | Gold | 500,000^{^} |
Summaries
| Worldwide | — | 650,000 |
^{^} Shipments figures based on certification alone.
